= List of 19th-century British children's literature titles =

This is a list of 19th-century British children's literature titles, arranged by year of publication.

- Moral Tales for Young People (1801) by Maria Edgeworth
- "The Juvenile Travellers: Containing the Remarks of A Family During a Tour Through the Principal States and Kingdoms of Europe", Priscilla Wakefield (1801)
- Tales from Shakespeare, Charles and Mary Lamb (1807)
- "The Son of a Genius", Barbara Hofland (1812)
- The History of Little Henry and his Bearer, Mary Martha Sherwood (1814)
- The History of the Fairchild Family, Mary Martha Sherwood (3 volumes, 1818, 1842, 1847)
- The Moss-House: In Which Many of the Works of Nature Are Rendered a Source of Amusement to Children, Agnes Strickland (1822)
- The History of Henry Milner, Mary Martha Sherwood (1822-1837)
- "The Rival Crusoes, or, The Shipwreck: Also A Voyage to Norway; and The Fisherman's Cottage : Founded on Facts, Agnes Strickland, 1826
- "The Young Crusoe", Barbara Hofland (1828)
- Mr Midshipman Easy, Frederick Marryat (1836)
- Masterman Ready, or the Wreck of the Pacific, Frederick Marryat (1841)
- The Settlers in Canada, Frederick Marryat (1844)
- The Children of the New Forest, Frederick Marryat (1847)
- Hudson Bay; or, Everyday Life in the Wilds of North America, R. M. Ballantyne (1848)
- The King of the Golden River, John Ruskin (1851)
- The Heir of Redclyffe, Charlotte M. Yonge (1853)
- The Little Duke: Richard the Fearless, Charlotte M. Yonge (1854)
- The Rose and the Ring, William Makepeace Thackeray (1854)
- The Lances of Lynwood, Charlotte M. Yonge (1855)
- Westward Ho!, Charles Kingsley (1855)
- The Daisy Chain, or Aspirations, Charlotte M. Yonge (1856)
- The Young Fur Traders, R. M. Ballantyne (1856)
- The Coral Island: A Tale of the Pacific Ocean, R. M. Ballantyne (1857)
- The Dog Crusoe and His Master, R. M. Ballantyne (1857)
- Tom Brown's Schooldays, Thomas Hughes (1857)
- Ungava: a Tale of Esquimaux Land, R. M. Ballantyne (1857)
- Eric, or, Little by Little, Frederic W. Farrar (1858)
- The South Sea Whaler W. H. G. Kingston (1859)
- The World of Ice, R. M. Ballantyne (1859)
- The Three Midshipmen, William Henry Giles Kingston (1860)
- Martin Rattler; or, a Boy's Adventures in the Forests of Brazil, R. M. Ballantyne (1860)
- The Gorilla Hunters, R. M. Ballantyne (1861)
- Tom Brown at Oxford, Thomas Hughes (1861)
- Countess Kate, Charlotte M. Yonge (1862)
- Melchior's Dream and Other Tales, Juliana Horatia Ewing (1862/1885)
- St. Winifred's, or, The World of School, Frederic W. Farrar (1862)
- The Water-Babies, A Fairy Tale for a Land Baby, Charles Kingsley (1863)
- Alice's Adventures in Wonderland, Lewis Carroll (1865)
- The Young Rajah, William Henry Giles Kingston (1865)
- The Prince and the Page, Charlotte M. Yonge (1866)
- Mrs. Overtheway's Remembrances, Juliana Horatia Ewing (1869)
- The Brownies, Palmer Cox (1870)
- The history and literature of the Israelites according to the Old Testament and the Apocrypha, Constance Flower & Annie Henrietta Yorke (1870)
- At the Back of the North Wind, George MacDonald (1871)
- The Owl and the Pussy-cat, Edward Lear (1871)
- Through the Looking-Glass, Lewis Carroll (1871)
- A Flat Iron for a Farthing, Juliana Horatia Ewing (1872)
- The Princess and the Goblin, George MacDonald (1872)
- Lob Lie-by-the-Fire, Juliana Horatia Ewing (1874)
- From Nowhere to the North Pole, Tom Hood (1875)
- Six to Sixteen, Juliana Horatia Ewing (1875)
- Carrots: Just a Little Boy Mary Louisa Molesworth (1876)
- The Hunting of the Snark, Lewis Carroll (1876)
- Jan of the Windmill, Juliana Horatia Ewing (1876)
- The Cuckoo Clock, Mary Louisa Molesworth (1877)
- A Great Emergency, Juliana Horatia Ewing (1877)
- Grandmother Dear, Mary Louisa Molesworth (1878)
- Jackanapes, Juliana Horatia Ewing (1879)
- The Tapestry Room, Mary Louisa Molesworth (1879)
- The Adventures of Herr Baby, Mary Louisa Molesworth (1881)
- Daddy Darwin's Dovecot, Juliana Horatia Ewing (1881)
- The Fifth Form at St. Dominic’s, Talbot Baines Reed (1881)
- Hoodie, Mary Louisa Molesworth (1881)
- The Princess and Curdie, George MacDonald (1883)
- Treasure Island, Robert Louis Stevenson (1883)
- By Sheer Pluck, A Tale of the Ashanti War, G. A. Henty (1884)
- Christmas Tree Land, Mary Louisa Molesworth (1884)
- Mary's Meadow, Juliana Horatia Ewing (1884)
- With Clive in India (1884), G. A. Henty
- A Child's Garden of Verses, Robert Louis Stevenson (1885)
- The Story of a Short Life, Juliana Horatia Ewing (1885)
- Kidnapped, Robert Louis Stevenson (1886)
- A World of Girls, L. T. Meade (1886)
- The Happy Prince and Other Stories, Oscar Wilde (1888)
- Friday's Child (1889)
- Andrew Lang's Fairy Books, Andrew Lang (from 1889)
- Catriona, Robert Louis Stevenson (1893)
- The Jungle Book, Rudyard Kipling (1894)
- Through the Sikh War, A Tale of the Conquest of the Punjab, G. A. Henty (1894)
- The Carved Lions, Mary Louisa Molesworth (1895)
- The Second Jungle Book, Rudyard Kipling (1895)
- Minstrel Dick, Christabel Rose Coleridge (1896)
- Captains Courageous, Rudyard Kipling (1897)
- The Story of the Treasure Seekers, E. Nesbit (1898)
- Stalky & Co. Rudyard Kipling (1899)
- The Wouldbegoods, E. Nesbit (1899)

== See also ==
- Books in the United Kingdom
