= Honor Brooke =

British writer, actor, and social reformer (1861–1940)

- Born: Honor Florence Brooke; 23 October 1861; London, England
- Died: 3 July 1940 (aged 78); Berkshire, England
- Occupations: Writer; actor; social reformer
- Partner: Agnes Valleris
- Father: Stopford Brooke
- Relatives: Stopford Brooke (brother); T. W. Rolleston (brother-in-law}; L. P. Jacks (brother-in-law); Leonard Leslie Brooke (brother-in-law); Henry Brooke, Baron Brooke of Cumnor (nephew); Somerset Stopford Brooke (nephew); Thomas Wentworth Beaumont (grandfather)

Honor Florence Brooke (23 October 1861 – 3 July 1940) was a British writer, actor, and social reformer.

== Early life and education ==
Brooke was born on 23 October 1861 in London to Stopford Brooke, an Irish clergyman, royal chaplain and writer, and Emma Diana Brooke (née Wentworth Beaumont; 1831–1874). One of eight siblings, Brooke was the younger sister of the Unitarian minister and politician Stopford Brooke. Brooke was the maternal granddaughter of the politician Thomas Wentworth Beaumont.

Following the death of her mother in 1874, Brooke and her siblings were partially raised by her paternal aunt Cecilia Brooke at the family home at 1 Manchester Square in Marylebone. Educated sporadically at home, Brooke also attended the Camden School for Girls, a school near Swiss Cottage, and a school near Fontainebleau.

== Career ==
Brooke performed regularly. She was described by The Illustrated London News as having "a most beautiful voice, clear and resonant as a bell, with faultless enunciation." The reviewer continued that "to hear her read or recite is an education". On 13 November 1908, alongside others including Lena Ashwell, Brooke performed poems at the Haymarket Theatre in a matinee raising funds to purchase Coleridge Cottage. Her father had played a leading role in securing Wordsworth's former home, Dove Cottage, for preservation and memorial.

=== Social work ===
In the 1880s, Brooke helped to nurse her friend Edith Ellis back to wellness following a nervous breakdown, bringing her to stay at Manchester Square. Ellis' husband, Havelock Ellis, later wrote of Brooke's influence:

I do not know how they met, but I know that Miss Brooke, with a self-sacrificing devotion and skill that called out Edith’s deep love, nursed her back to health, brought her into cheerful and cultured society—opening to her the charming refinements of the Brookes’ house in Manchester Square, a notable intellectual centre—and turned her renascent energies into channels of social work in the slums.

In 1890 Brooke founded the Honor Club, intended to provide entertainment and respite for working women. Originally based in Fitzroy Square, the club later moved to 118 Great Titchfield Street, near to Oxford Street. Her sister Evelyn wrote:

Our objects are social as well as educational; and we do not press our members to join classes. After a long day's work what the girls most desire is some quiet place to sit in, which is cheerful and bright and warm, where they can meet their friends, or play games, or listen to music. Rooms are always set aside for rest.

Linked to this was the founding of the Children's Holiday Fund, which provided countryside holidays for the children of poor parents. Brooke led this initiative, inspired by her work and the poverty she witnessed among those in board schools.

Brooke was a member of the Incorporated Stage Society and on the committee of the Women's Protective and Provident League.

== Personal life ==
Brooke was the aunt of Somerset Stopford Brooke and Henry Brooke, Baron Brooke of Cumnor, as well as the sister in law of T. W. Rolleston, L. P. Jacks, Leonard Leslie Brooke.

For 40 years from 1891, she lived with Agnes Valleris (Ellen Agnes Gooddy), a singer and music teacher. The two performed literature recitations along with musical accompaniment together for charity.

Brooke died on 3 July 1940 in Berkshire aged 78. She left £2,000 to the University of London for founding a scholarship in memory of her father, to be called The Stopford Brooke English Literature Scholarship; and £500 each to the West Ham Home and Hostel for Girls and the Canning Town Women's Settlement.

== Bibliography ==
- Mornings with the Cardinal, an account of conversations with Cardinal Manning (1892)
- 'Burne-Jones and his Art' in The English Illustrated Magazine (January 1893)
