= Mary Louisa Molesworth =

English writer of children's stories

- Stories (1922)
- Born: 29 May 1839; Rotterdam, South Holland, Netherlands
- Died: 20 January 1921 (aged 81); London, England
- Occupation: Writer
- Writing career
- Pen name: Ennis Graham, Mrs Molesworth
- Period: Nineteenth century
- Genre: Children's literature

Mary Louisa Molesworth, née Stewart (29 May 1839 – 20 January 1921) was an English writer of children's stories who wrote for children under the name of Mrs Molesworth. Her first novels, for adult readers, Lover and Husband (1869) to Cicely (1874), appeared under the pseudonym of Ennis Graham. Her name occasionally appears in print as M. L. S. Molesworth.

== Life ==
Molesworth was born in Rotterdam, a daughter of Charles Augustus Stewart (1809–1873), who later became a rich merchant in Manchester, and his wife Agnes Janet Wilson (1810–1883). Mary had three brothers and two sisters. She was educated in Great Britain and Switzerland, and much of her girlhood was spent in Manchester. In 1861 she married Major R. Molesworth, nephew of Viscount Molesworth; they legally separated in 1879. She lived for an early part of her marriage in Tabley Grange, outside Knutsford in Cheshire, rented from George, 2nd Lord de Tabley.

Molesworth is best known as a writer of books for children, such as Tell Me a Story (1875), Carrots (1876), The Cuckoo Clock (1877), The Tapestry Room (1879), and A Christmas Child (1880). She has been called "the Jane Austen of the nursery," while The Carved Lions (1895) "is probably her masterpiece." In the judgement of Roger Lancelyn Green:

Mary Louisa Molesworth typified late Victorian writing for girls. Aimed at girls too old for fairies and princesses but too young for Austen and the Brontës, books by Molesworth had their share of amusement, but they also had a good deal of moral instruction. The girls reading Molesworth would grow up to be mothers; thus, the books emphasized Victorian notions of duty and self-sacrifice.

Typical of the time, her young characters often use a lisping style, and words may be misspelt to represent children's speech—"jography" for geography, for instance.

She also took an interest in supernatural fiction. In 1888, she published a collection of supernatural tales under the title Four Ghost Stories, and in 1896 a similar collection of six stories under the title Uncanny Tales. In addition to those, her volume Studies and Stories includes a ghost story entitled "Old Gervais" and her Summer Stories for Boys and Girls includes "Not exactly a ghost story."

A new edition of The Cuckoo Clock was published in 1914.

She died in 1921 and is buried in Brompton Cemetery, London.

== References in other works ==
- Siegfried Sassoon mentions, in his 1928 autobiographical novel Memoirs of a Fox-Hunting Man, Molesworth's The Palace in the Garden and Four Winds Farm as being 'almost' his favourite books.
- Agatha Christie mentions The Tapestry Room and Four Winds Farm in her novel Postern of Fate, as childhood favourites of her detectives Tommy and Tuppence.
- In The Whirling Shapes by Joan North, Two Little Waifs by Mrs. Molesworth is mentioned as a book (Great-)Aunt Hilda was given by her father on her eighth birthday.

== Works ==
- Jack, Dick and Bob: The Three Jackdaws from Hurstmonceaux, as by E.G. (1865?) – 1875, OCLC 228106070
- Lover and Husband: A Novel, as by Ennis Graham (1870)
- Not Without Thorns, as Graham (1873)
- Cicely: A Story of Three Years, as Graham (1874)
- Tell Me a Story, as Graham (1875) – collection
- "Carrots": Just a Little Boy, as Graham (1876)
- The Cuckoo Clock, as Graham, illustrated by Walter Crane (1877)
- Hathercourt Rectory, 3 vols (March 1878) – as by 'Mrs. Molesworth ("Ennis Graham")'
- "Grandmother Dear": A Book for Boys and Girls, illus. Crane (1878)
- The Tapestry Room: A Child's Romance, illus. Crane (1879)
- A Christmas Child: A Sketch of a Boy-Life (1880)
- Miss Bouverie: A novel (1880)
- The adventures of Herr Baby (1881)
- Rosy (1882)
- Summer Stories for Boys and Girls (1882) – 5 tales in a frame story
- The Boys and I: A child's story for children (1883)
- Two little waifs (1883)
- Christmas-tree land (1886)
- "Us": an old-fashioned story (1886)
- Four Winds Farm (1887)
- Little Miss Peggy: Only a Nursery Story (1887)
- The Palace in the Garden (1887)
- A Christmas Posy (1888)
- Four Ghost Stories (1888) – collection of 4
- French life in letters (1889)
- The rectory children (1889)
- Neighbours (1889, also by Mary Ellen Edwards)
- The Children of the Castle (1890), OCLC 905318144
- The Green Casket, and Other Stories (1890)
- Family troubles (1890)
- Imogen : or, Only eighteen (1890s)
- Robin Redbreast : a story for girls (1890s)
- An Enchanted Garden: Fairy Stories, illus. W. J. Hennessy (1892) – coll. of 7, OCLC 905335233
- The Girls and I: A Veracious History (1892)
- The Man With the Pan-Pipes; and Other Stories (circa 1892)
- Leona (circa 1892)
- The next-door house (1892)
- Mary (1893)
- Nurse Heatherdale's Story; and Little Miss Peggy (1893)
- Studies and Stories (1893) – collection, mainly nonfiction
- My New Home (1894)
- The Carved Lions, illus. L. Leslie Brooke (1895)
- Olivia, a story for girls (1895)
- Uncanny Tales (circa 1896) – collection of 6
- Philippa (1896)
- Sheila's Mystery (1896)
- The Oriel window (1896)
- Hoodie (1897)
- Meg Langholme; or, The day after to-morrow (1897)
- Miss Mouse and Her Boys (1897)
- The Magic Nuts, illus. Rosie M. M. Pitman (1898)
- The Laurel Walk (1899)
- This and that : a tale of two tinies (1899)
- The Wood-pigeons and Mary, by Molesworth and H. R. Millar (1901)
- Peterkin (1902)
- Fairies—of Sorts, illus. Gertrude Demain Hammond (1908) – coll. of 5
- Fairies Afield, illus. Hammond (1911) – coll. of 4
- Edmeé: a tale of the French revolution (1916)
- Stories by Mrs. Molesworth (compiled by Sidney Baldwin, 1922)
- Five Minutes' Stories (not dated—1888?)
- Great-Uncle Hoot-Toot (not dated—1889?)
- The Thirteen Little Black Pigs, and Other Stories (not dated—1893?)
- Blanche: A Story for Girls (not dated—1893?)
- The Grim House (1899)
- The House That Grew (1900)
- Jasper (1906)
- The Laurel Walk (1898)
- Lettice (1884)
- The Little Old Portrait: Later: Edmee, A Tale of the French Revolution (1884)
- Mary (1893)
- Nurse Heatherdale's Story (1891)
- The Old Pincushion; or, Aunt Clotilda's Guests (1889)
- Silverthorns (1887)
- Sweet Content (1891)
- That Girl in Black (1889)
- The Third Miss St Quentin (1888)
- White Turrets (1895)
- The Bolted Door: and other stories (1906) illustrated by Lewis Baumer

== Anthologies as contributor ==
- A Christmas Fairy and Other Stories (1878) – John Strange Winter, Mrs. Molesworth, and Frances E. Crompton
- Jack Frost's Little Prisoners: A Collection of Stories for Children from Four to Twelve Years of Age (1887) – other contributors Stella Austin, S. Baring-Gould, Caroline Birley, Edward Hugessen Knatchbull-Hugessen Brabourne, Mrs. Massey, Anne Thackeray Ritchie, E. M. Wilmot-Buxton, and Charlotte M. Yonge)
- A Budget of Christmas Tales, by Charles Dickens and Others (circa 1895) – other contributors Charles Dickens, Margaret Elizabeth Munson Sangster, Mrs. W. H. Corning, Irving Bacheller, Julia Schayer, Hezekiah Butterworth, Cornelia Redmond, Harriet Beecher Stowe, Ella Wheeler Wilcox, C. H. Mead, Herbert W. Collingwood, and Juliana Horatia Ewing)
