= Science & Religion: A Symposium =

Book by Michael Pupin

- Title page for Science & Religion: A Symposium (1931)
- Author: Mihajlo Pupin et al
- Publisher: Books for Libraries Press
- Publication date: 1931
- ISBN: 0-8369-1106-7
- OCLC: 17462
- Dewey Decimal: 215
- LC Class: BL240 .S367 1969

Science & Religion: A Symposium (1931) is a book first published in 1931, consisting of a lightly edited transcription of twelve talks broadcast on the BBC between September and December 1930. In contrast to the 1920s conflicts between science and religion in the U.S. (e.g., the Scopes trial), 1920s Great Britain experienced a concerted effort at reconciliation. These efforts bore some fruit in the early 1930s such as in BBC radio broadcasts (e.g., this text), but ultimately these efforts broke down due in part to rejection from both 1930s conservative Christians and arch secularists (e.g., H.G. Wells).

The book contains a foreword by Mihajlo Pupin and twelve talks by Julian Huxley, J. Arthur Thomson, J.S. Haldane, E.W. Barnes, B. Malinowski, H. R. L. Sheppard, B. H. Streeter, C.W. O'Hara, Arthur S. Eddington, S. Alexander, W.R. Inge, and L.P. Jacks.

== See also ==
- Relationship between religion and science
