= Minnie Cormack =

Irish-British painter and engraver (1862–1919)

- Born: 1862; Skibbereen, Ireland
- Died: 1919
- Other names: Mary Jane Everett
- Occupation(s): Painter, Mezzotint engraver
- Employer: Pomona Studios
- Spouse: Charles J. Praetorius

Mary Jane Everett Cormack (1862 – 1919) was an Irish-British painter and mezzotint engraver.

== Early life ==
Mary Jane Maria Lee Everett was born in 1862 in Skibbereen, Ireland. She lived in London, Dorking, Selsey and Salcombe in the south of England. She married noted illustrator Charles J. Praetorius, son of photographer Charles B. Praetorius.

== Works ==
Praetorius and Minnie worked at Pomona Studios, shared with Mary Wheelhouse in Eel Brook Common. Cormack's subjects included Lord Balfour, and a child of Countess Albinia Hobart.

== Gallery ==
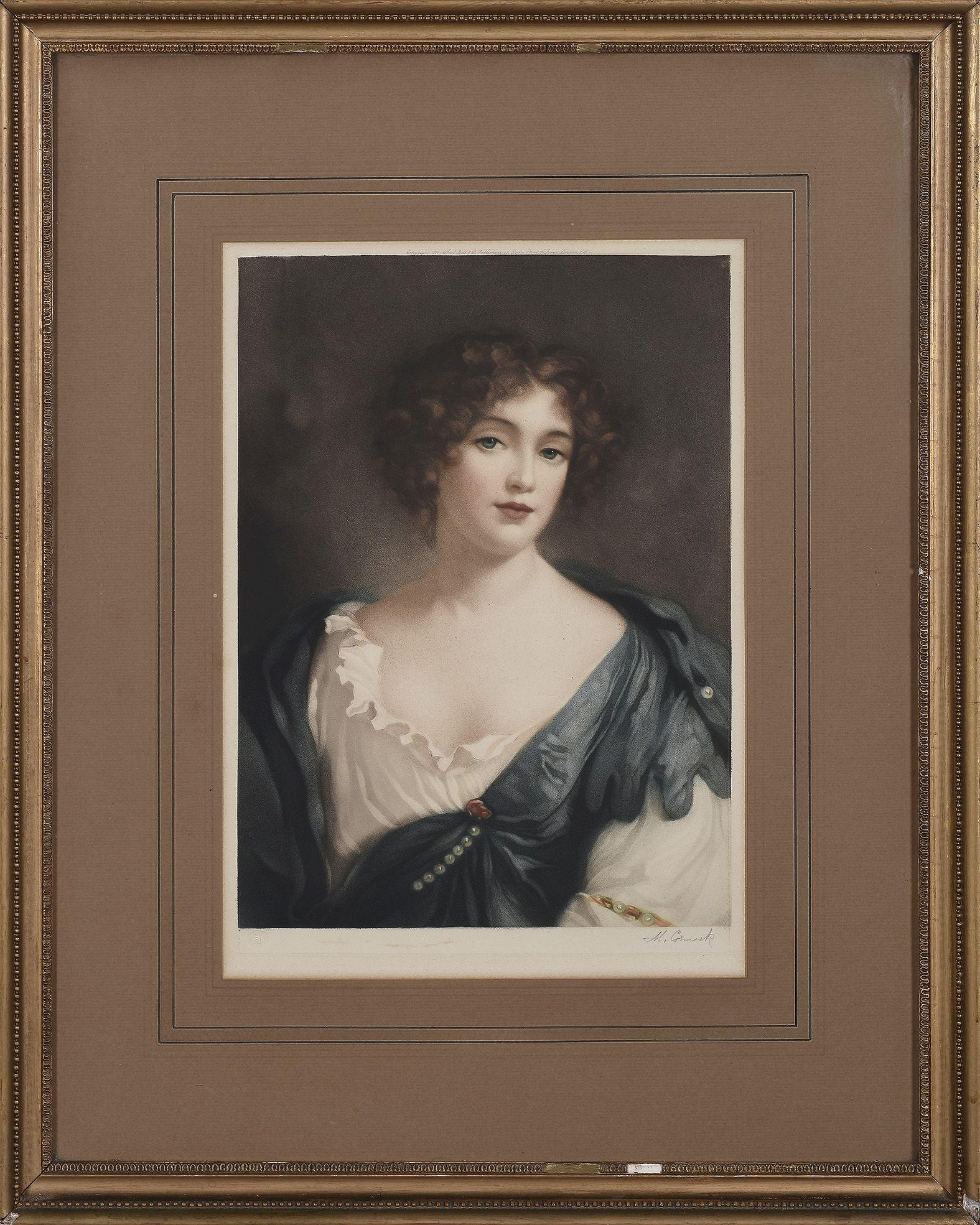
Nell Gwynn work by Cormack

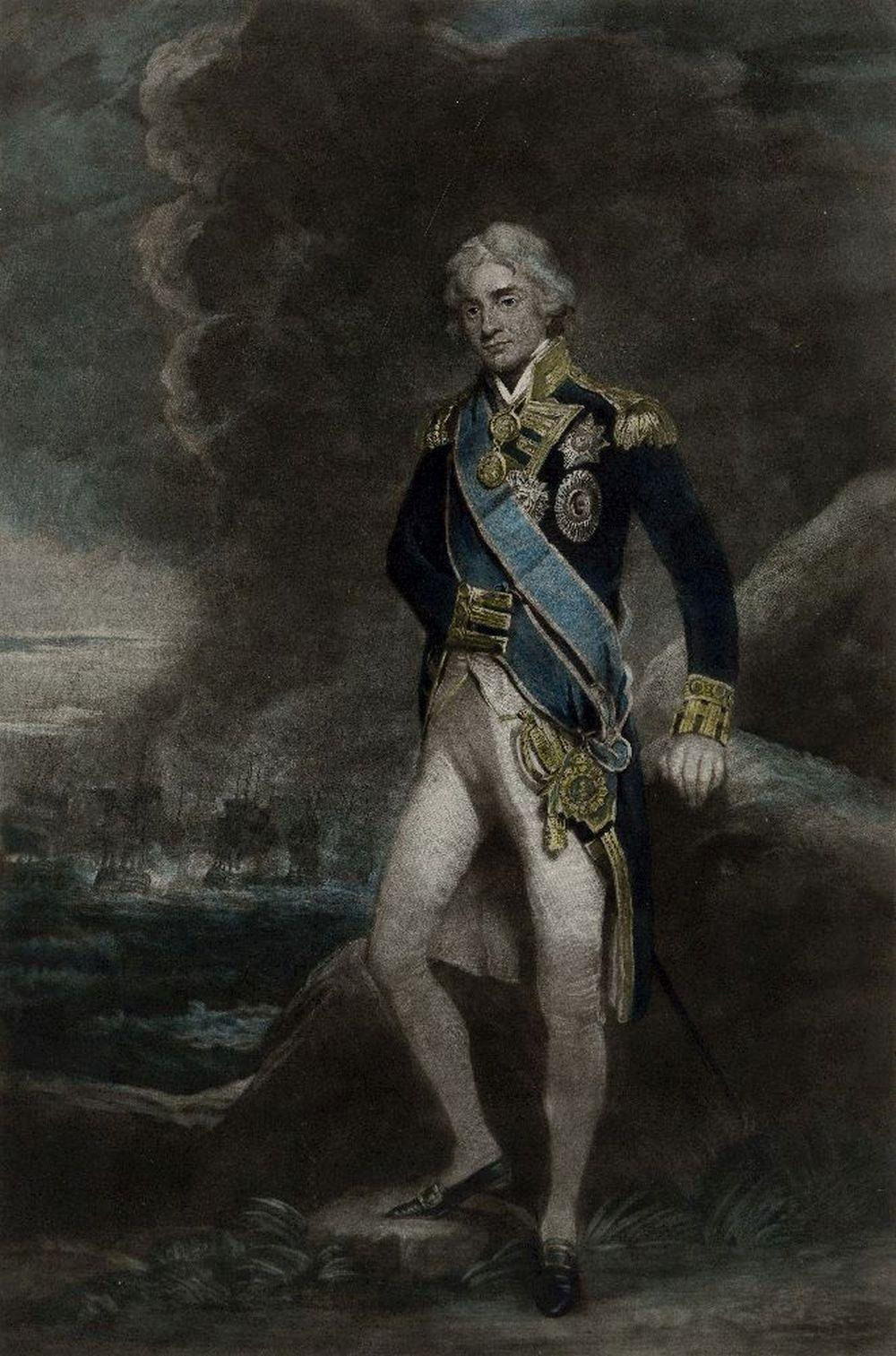
Colorised etching of Lord Nelson, based on a work by John Hoppner

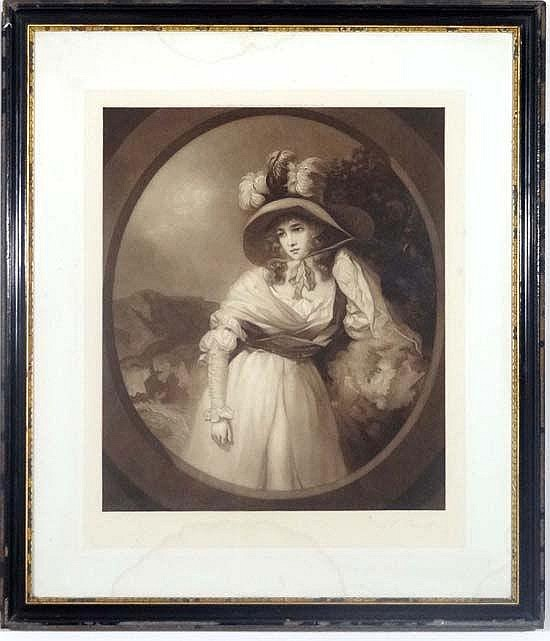
Mezzotint etching after a work by Thomas Lawrence
