= Leonard Leslie Brooke =

British artist and writer (1862–1940)

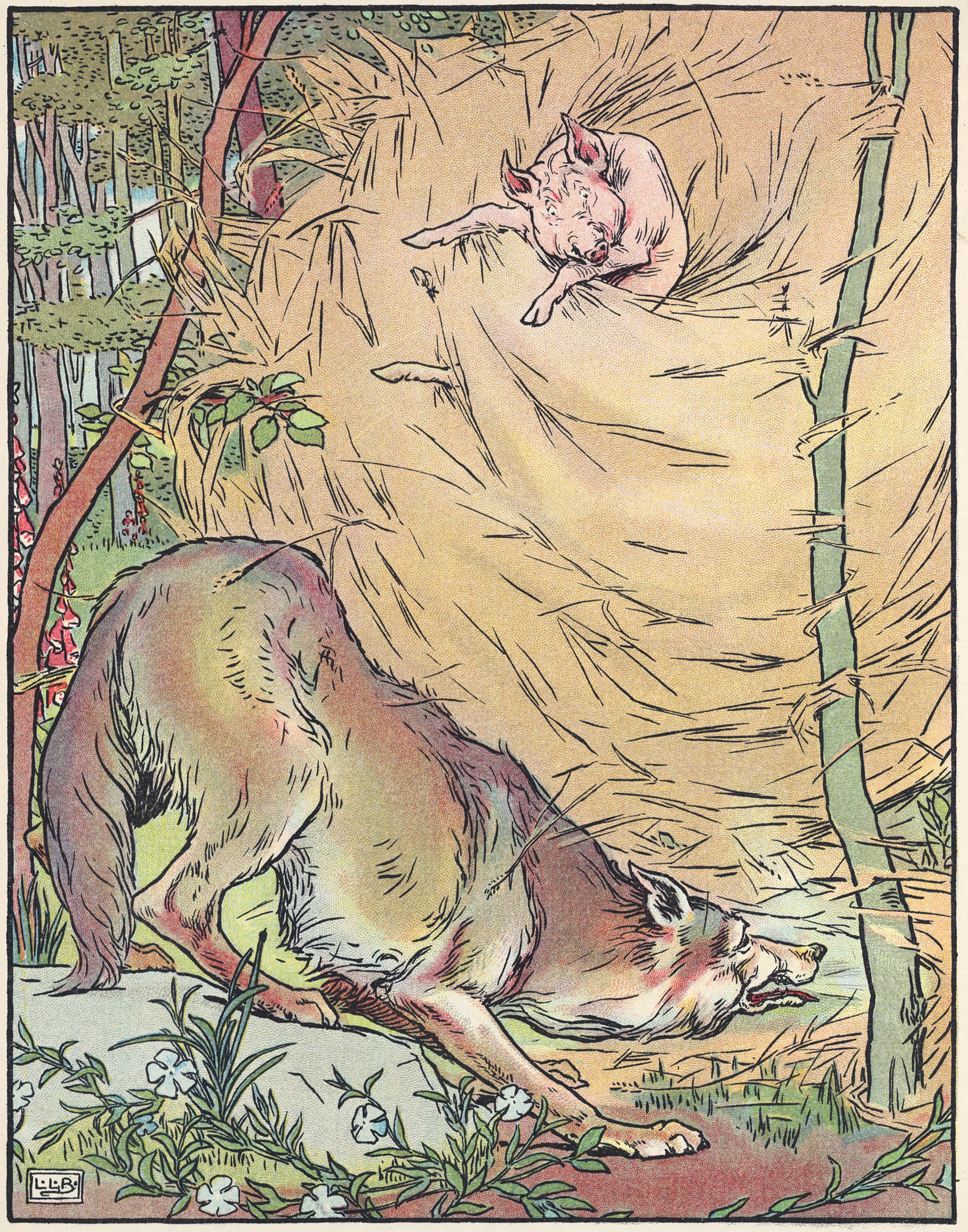
Illustration by Leonard Leslie Brooke of the story "Three Little Pigs".

Leonard Leslie Brooke (24 September 1862 – 2 May 1940) was a British artist, book illustrator and writer.

== Early life and education ==
Brooke was born in Birkenhead, England, the second son of Leonard D. Brooke. He was educated at Birkenhead School and the Royal Academy Schools. While travelling in Italy, Brooke survived a serious illness, but was left permanently deaf.

== Career ==
Brooke was an accomplished oil painter. In 1894, he displayed a painting entitled "I was ever a fighter, so one fight more" at the New Gallery on Regents Street, London. The painting shows a vigorous half-length of a bare-headed soldier of the seventeenth century, which a reviewer praised for 'the breezy life of the face and pose'. Brooke also painted his relative, Mr. Stopford Brooke. Other exhibits included 'Love among the Ruins' by Edward Burne Jones, as well as work by Edward Arthur Fellowes Prynne Lawrence Alma-Tadema, George Frederic Watts, Charles Edward Hallé, Edward Matthew Hale, Walter Crane, William Laidlay, John Roddam Spencer Stanhope, George Hitchcock, Frank William Brangwyn, Andrew Brown Donaldson, George Henry Boughton, Arthur Lemon, George Howard, 9th Earl of Carlisle, Edward Poynter, William Llewellyn (painter), William Logsdail, Philip Norman (artist), Clara Montalba, William Wontner and George Frampton.

However, Brooke was best known as a book illustrator. WorldCat library records show that he illustrated several works by Mrs. Molesworth in the mid-1890s, perhaps from 1892; one was The Carved Lions (1895) in its first edition. His skillful and witty illustrations in Andrew Lang's Nursery Rhyme Book (1897) established his reputation as a leading children's book illustrator of pen-and-ink line drawings and watercolors. His acclaimed works include Johnny Crow's Garden (1903), "Ring O' Roses", "The Golden Goose Book", Johnny Crow's Party (1907), Johnny Crow's New Garden (1935), "The Nursery Rhyme Book", and "Oranges and Lemons" published by Frederick Warne & Co.

== Personal life ==
Brooke married Sybil Diana Brooke, daughter of his cousin, Rev. Stopford Brooke (chaplain). They had two sons:

- 2nd Lt. Leonard Stopford Brooke (1895–1918), killed in Germany during the First World War.
- Henry Brooke, Baron Brooke of Cumnor (1903–1984), Conservative politician who served as Home Secretary from 1962 to 1964

Brooke died at his home in Hampstead, age 77.

== Legacy ==
Brooke has two paintings in British National Collections. In Children's Reading, Lewis M. Terman and Margaret Lima recommended some of his picture books (such as "The Golden Goose Book", the two that feature Johnny Crow, and others), commenting that Brooke "catches the spirit of childhood with rare skill".
