= Tales from Shakespeare =

1807 children's book by Charles and Mary Lamb

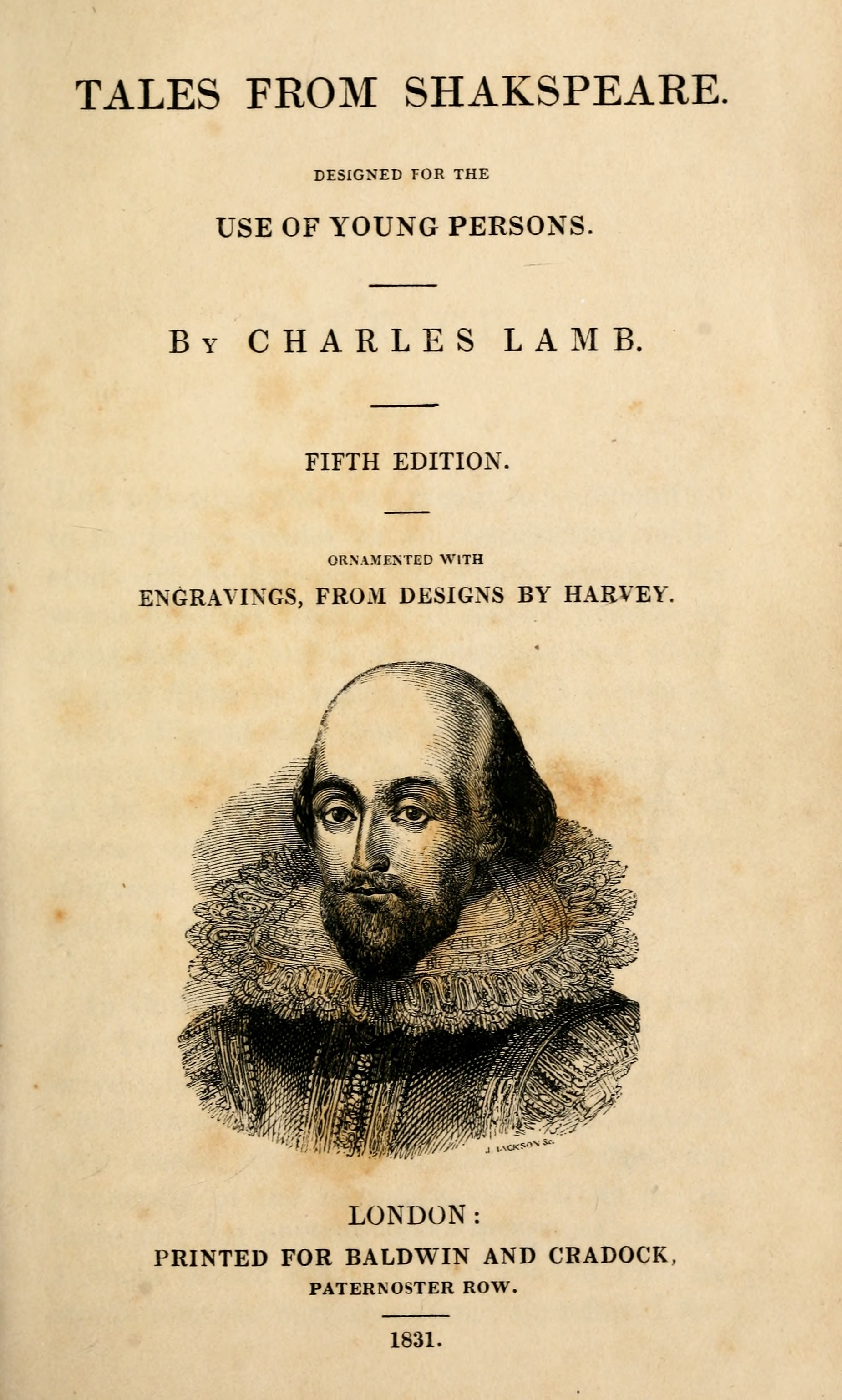
- Fifth edition title page (1831)
- Author: Charles and Mary Lamb
- Language: English
- Genre: Fiction; Children's literature
- Publication date: 1807 (first printing)
- Publication place: Great Britain

Tales from Shakespeare is an English children's book written by the siblings Charles and Mary Lamb in 1807, intended "for the use of young persons" while retaining as much Shakespearean language as possible. Mary Lamb was responsible for retelling the comedies and Charles the tragedies. They omitted the more complex historical tales, including all Roman plays, and modified those they chose to retell in a manner sensitive to the needs of young children, but without resorting to actual censoring. However, subplots and sexual references were removed. They wrote the preface together.

Marina Warner, in her introduction to the 2007 Penguin Classics edition, claims that Mary did not get her name on the title page till the seventh edition in 1838.

Despite its original target audience, "very young" children from the early twenty-first century might find this book a challenging read, and alternatives are available. Nevertheless, the retelling of the Lamb siblings remains uniquely faithful to the original and as such can be useful to children when they read or learn the plays as Shakespeare wrote them.

== Publication history ==
Tales from Shakespeare has been republished many times and has never been out of print. Charles and Mary Lamb appeared to have anticipated the enormous growth in the popularity of Shakespeare in the nineteenth century, when the book was one of the best-selling titles. It was first published by the Juvenile Library of William Godwin (under the alias Thomas Hodgkins) and his second wife, Mary Jane Clairmont, who chose the illustrations, probably by William Mulready. Later illustrators included Sir John Gilbert in 1866, Arthur Rackham in 1899 and 1909, Louis Monziès in 1908, Walter Paget in 1910, and D. C. Eyles in 1934.

In 1893-4, the book was supplemented with some additional tales by Harrison S. Morris, and was re-published in the USA as a multi-volume set with colour plate illustrations. As noted in the authors' preface, "[Shakespeare's] words are used whenever it seemed possible to bring them in; and in whatever has been added to give them the regular form of a connected story, diligent care has been taken to select such words as might least interrupt the effect of the beautiful English tongue in which he wrote: therefore, words introduced into our language since his time have been as far as possible avoided."

== Contents ==
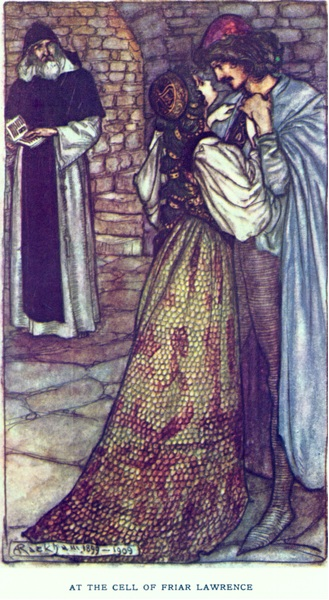
1909 Illustration for Romeo and Juliet by Arthur Rackham

The book contains the following tales:

1. The Tempest (Mary Lamb)
2. A Midsummer Night's Dream (Mary Lamb)
3. The Winter's Tale (Mary Lamb)
4. Much Ado About Nothing (Mary Lamb)
5. As You Like It (Mary Lamb)
6. Two Gentlemen of Verona (Mary Lamb)
7. The Merchant of Venice (Mary Lamb)
8. Cymbeline (Mary Lamb)
9. King Lear (Charles Lamb)
10. Macbeth (Charles Lamb)
11. All's Well That Ends Well (Mary Lamb)
12. The Taming of the Shrew (Mary Lamb)
13. The Comedy of Errors (Mary Lamb)
14. Measure for Measure (Mary Lamb)
15. Twelfth Night (Mary Lamb)
16. Timon of Athens (Charles Lamb)
17. Romeo and Juliet (Charles Lamb)
18. Hamlet, Prince of Denmark (Charles Lamb)
19. Othello (Charles Lamb)
20. Pericles, Prince of Tyre (Mary Lamb)

== In fiction ==
The book is given as a gift in Morley's "Parnassus on Wheels".

Graham Greene uses Tales from Shakespeare for a book code in Our Man in Havana.

Tales from Shakespeare is referenced in the 2018 film The Guernsey Literary and Potato Peel Pie Society.

== See also ==
- List of 19th-century British children's literature titles
- Victorian literature
