= Stopford Brooke (chaplain) =

Irish clergyman, royal chaplain and writer (1832–1916)

The Rev Stopford Brooke
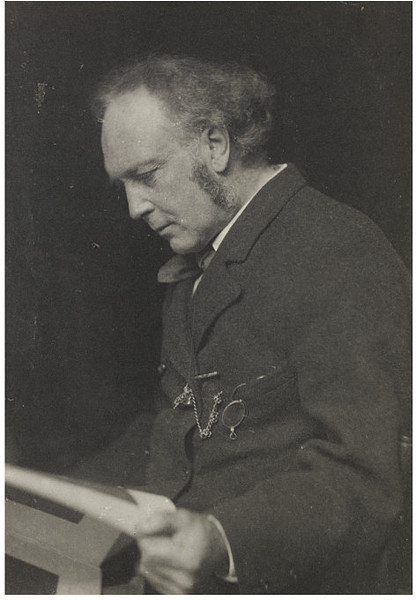
- Portrait of Brooke by Frederick Hollyer, c. 1890
- Born: Stopford Augustus Brooke; 14 November 1832; Glendoen, County Donegal, Ireland
- Died: 18 March 1916 (aged 83); Cranleigh, Surrey, England
- Education: Trinity College Dublin
- Occupations: Clergyman; royal chaplain; writer
- Spouse: Emma Diana Brooke (m. 1858; died 1874)
- Children: 7, including: Honor Brooke; Stopford Brooke
- Relatives: Thomas Wentworth Beaumont (father-in-law); T. W. Rolleston (son-in-law}; L. P. Jacks (son-in-law); Leonard Leslie Brooke (son-in-law); Henry Brooke, Baron Brooke of Cumnor (grandson)

The Rev Stopford Augustus Brooke (14 November 1832 – 18 March 1916) was an Irish clergyman, royal chaplain and writer.

== Early life and education ==
Brooke was born on 14 November 1832 at Glendoen, County Donegal to The Rev Richard Sinclair Brooke, a curate, and Anna Brooke (née Stopford), the daughter of the rector Joseph Stopford. The eldest of eight siblings, Brooke was the brother of the public servant, preacher, and educationalist William Graham Brooke. Following Stopford's death in 1833, Brooke's father took a curacy in Abbeyleix, County Laois before becoming the chaplain at the Mariners' church, Kingstown (now Dún Laoghaire) in 1836.

From 1847 to 1849, Brooke was a boarder at a grammar school in Kidderminster before attending Kingston Grammar School during 1849 and 1850. In the October of the same year, Brooke enrolled at Trinity College Dublin. Brooke graduated with his Bachelor's in 1856, and his Master's in 1862.

== Career ==
Brooke was ordained in the Church of England in 1857 and held various charges in London. From 1863 to 1865 he was chaplain to the Empress Frederick in Berlin. In 1869 with his brother Edward he made long tours of Donegal and Sligo, and spent much time at Kells studying Irish antiquities. Between 1866 and 1875 he was the minister at St James's Chapel, a Proprietary Chapel, and after it closed he took services at Bedford Chapel, Bloomsbury where he continued to attract large congregations. In 1875, he became chaplain in ordinary to Queen Victoria. But in 1880 he seceded from the Church, being no longer able to accept its leading dogmas, and officiated as an independent preacher for some years at Bedford chapel, Bloomsbury.

Bedford chapel was pulled down about 1894, and from that time he had no church of his own, but his eloquence and powerful religious personality continued to make themselves felt among a wide circle. A man of independent means, he was always keenly interested in literature and art, and a fine critic of both. The two-volume Life and Letters of Stopford Brooke, written by his son-in-law L. P. Jacks and published in 1917, contains many details of different facets of his life.

== Literary interests ==
In 1890-1 Brooke took the lead in raising the funds to purchase Dove Cottage, William Wordsworth's home in Grasmere from 1800 to 1808, and establishing it “for the eternal possession of those who love English poetry all over the world". Dove Cottage is now administered by the Wordsworth Trust.

Brooke published in 1865 his Life and Letters of F. W. Robertson (of Brighton), and in 1876 wrote an admirable primer of English Literature (new and revised ed., 1900—but see below), followed in 1892 by The History of Early English Literature (2 vols, 1892) down to the accession of Alfred the Great, and English Literature from the Beginnings to the Norman Conquest (1898).

He gave the inaugural lecture to the Irish Literary Society, London, on "The Need and Use of Getting Irish Literature into the English Tongue" (Bloomsbury House, 11 March 1893).

He delivered a sermon on "The Kingdom of God Within" to the International Council of Unitarian and Other Liberal Religious Thinkers and Workers, meeting in London in May 1901.

== Family life and death ==
On 23 March 1858, Brooke married Emma Diana Brooke (née Wentworth Beaumont; 1831–1874), the daughter of the British politician Thomas Wentworth Beaumont. Together they had six daughters, the eldest of whom was the social reformer Honor Brooke, and two sons, including Stopford Brooke, a Member of Parliament from 1906 to 1910. Brooke's second daughter Maud married T. W. Rolleston, the Irish writer; his fourth daughter Olive married L. P. Jacks, philosopher, Unitarian minister and Principal of Manchester College, Oxford; and his fifth daughter Sybil married L. Leslie Brooke, the artist of children's books: their son Henry was to become Home Secretary.

In 1911, Brooke built a house in Cranleigh, Surrey, called Four Winds. He retired there fully in 1914, and died at home on 18 March 1916 of heart failure and underlying diabetes.

Brooke's published letters record that his work brought him into touch with most of his famous contemporaries - including Alfred, Lord Tennyson, Burne-Jones, William Morris, Viscount Bryce, James Martineau and Matthew Arnold. An art collector, he left the work The Cock Tavern at Cheam by Richard Wilson to the Tate Galleries.

== Selected bibliography ==
- Various volumes of sermons
- Poems (1888)
- Dove Cottage (1890)
- Theology in the English Poets Cowper, Coleridge, Wordsworth, Burns (1874)
- Notes on the Liber Studiorum of J. M. W. Turner (1885; a later publication on the same subject "suggested by the writings of Mr. Ruskin")
- Tennyson, his Art and Relation to Modern Life (1894)
- A Treasury of Irish Poetry in the English Tongue (co-edited with his son-in-law T.W.Rolleston) (1900)
- The Poetry of Robert Browning (1902)
- On Ten Plays of Shakespeare (1905)
- The Life Superlative (1906)
