= Mrs. Overtheway's Remembrances =

1869 book by Juliana Horatia Ewing

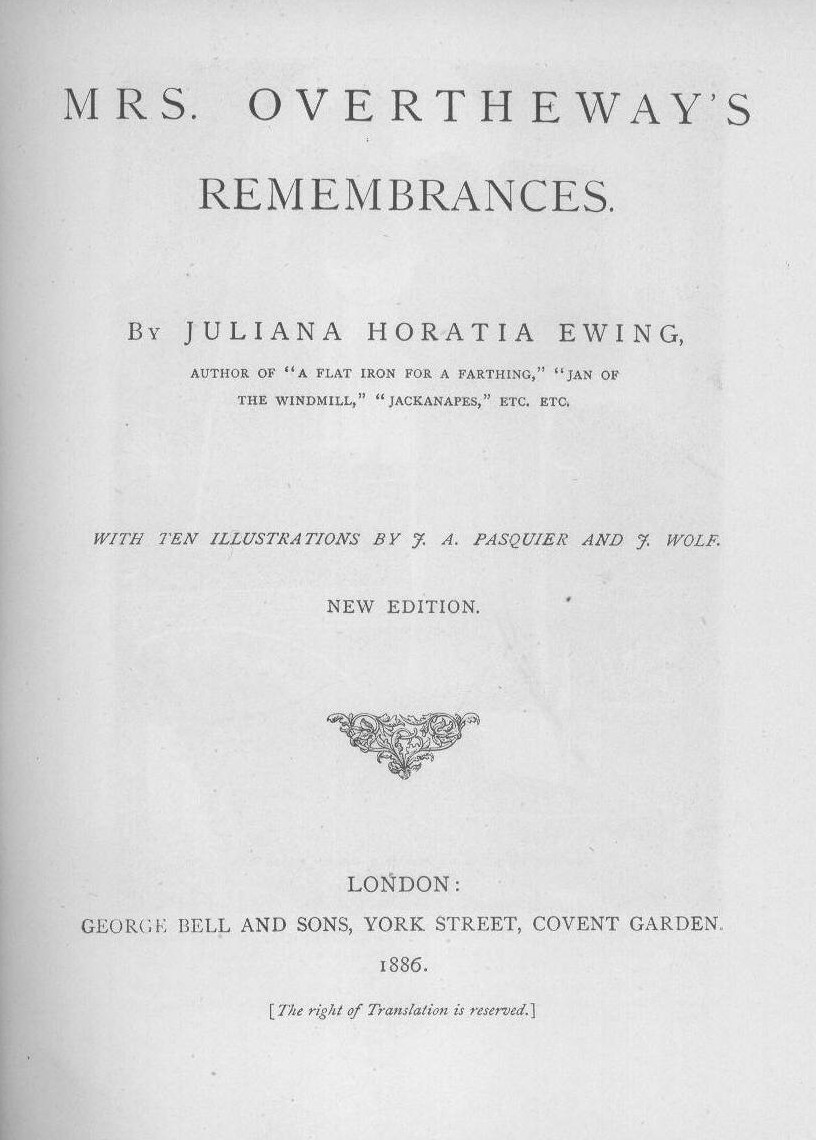
- Title page from 1886 edition of the book
- Author: Juliana Horatia Ewing

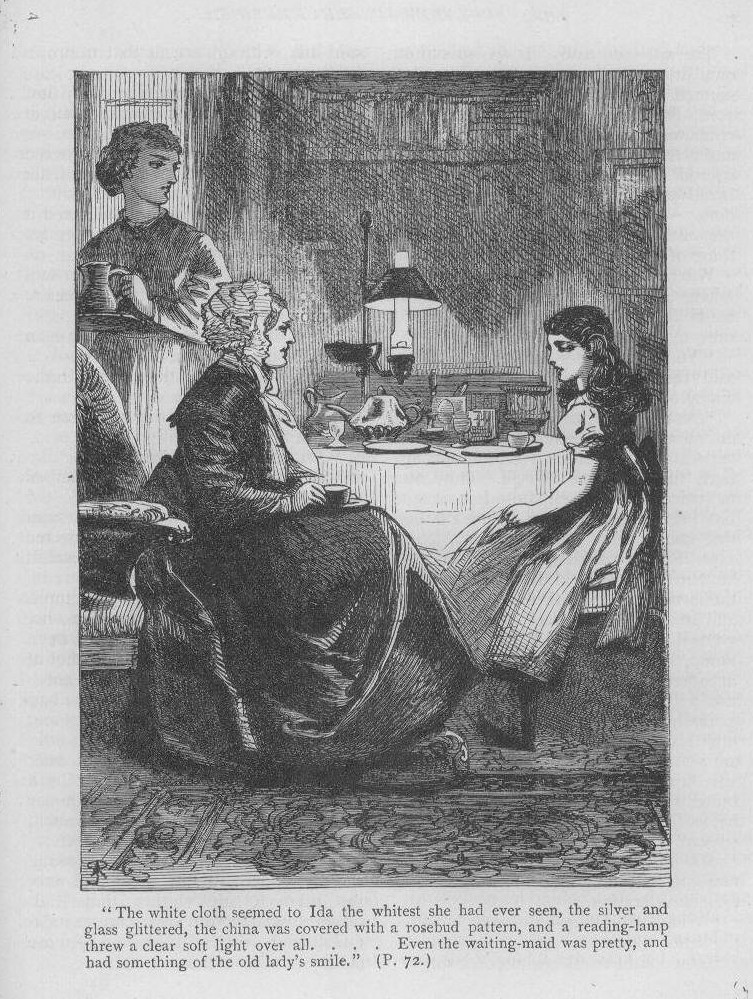
Illustration for page 72, Mrs. Overtheway's Remembrance.

Mrs. Overtheway's Remembrances is the first children's book published in 1869 by author Juliana Horatia Ewing (1841–1885).

The story was originally published in serial form in Aunt Judy's Magazine from May 1866 to October 1868. It was published in book form in 1881 by George Bell & Sons, London, with illustrations by J.A. Pasquier and J. Wolf. It was republished in 1925, also by George Bell & Sons, with illustrations by M.V. Wheelhouse.
