= A Flat Iron for a Farthing =

- Title page from a 1926 edition of the book with illustrations by M.V. Wheelhouse.
- Author: Juliana Horatia Ewing
- Publication date: 1872

A Flat Iron for a Farthing (1872) is a book by Juliana Horatia Ewing (1842–1885) and consists of childhood reminiscences of the only child of a widowed father. It was one of the author's most popular books.
