= Rose M. M. Pitman =

English illustrator

- Born: Rose Margaret McLean Pitman; 1868; Manchester, England
- Died: 1947 (aged 78–79)
- Other name: Rosie M. M. Pitman
- Occupation: Illustrator
- Years active: 1894-1904
- Spouse: Frederick Heine

Rose M. M. Pitman (1868–1947) was an English illustrator. She is best known for her illustrations for the 1897 edition of Undine by Friedrich de la Motte Fouqué and for illustrating children's books.

== Biography ==
Rose "Rosie" M. M. Pitman was born into a prominent family in Manchester in 1868. Her uncle was Sir Isaac Pitman, the inventor of Pitman shorthand, and her father, Henry Pitman, was an expert in the same field. She worked as an illustrator from 1894 to 1904. She worked in Manchester, then in London from 1894 to 1902, and later in Ledbury.

Pitman's illustrations for Undine by Fouqué (Macmillan, 1897), rendered in the pre-Raphaelite style, are considered some of her finest work. A reviewer in The Magazine of Art wrote, "She is not a mere illustrator; she shows the power of original thought which marks the true artist." Other children's books she illustrated include Maurice, Or, the Red Jar by the Countess of Jersey (1894), and The Magic Nuts (1898) and The Ruby Ring (1904) by Mrs. Molesworth. She exhibited at the Royal Academy of Arts and contributed to magazines such as Quarto. Her work is included in M. H. Spielmann's Littledom Castle and Other Tales (1903) along with that of Harry Furniss, Kate Greenaway, Jessie M. King, Phil May, Arthur Rackham, Henriette Ronner, Hugh Thomson, and C. Wilhelm.

In 1905 she married Frederick Heine, a German immigrant, and apparently gave up her career. Little is known of her later life. She died in 1947.

== Image gallery ==
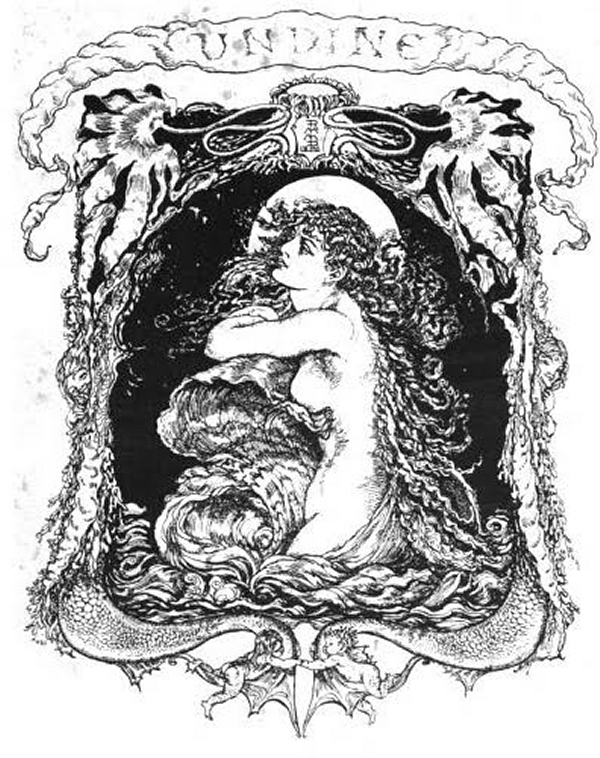
Frontispiece (Undine, 1897)

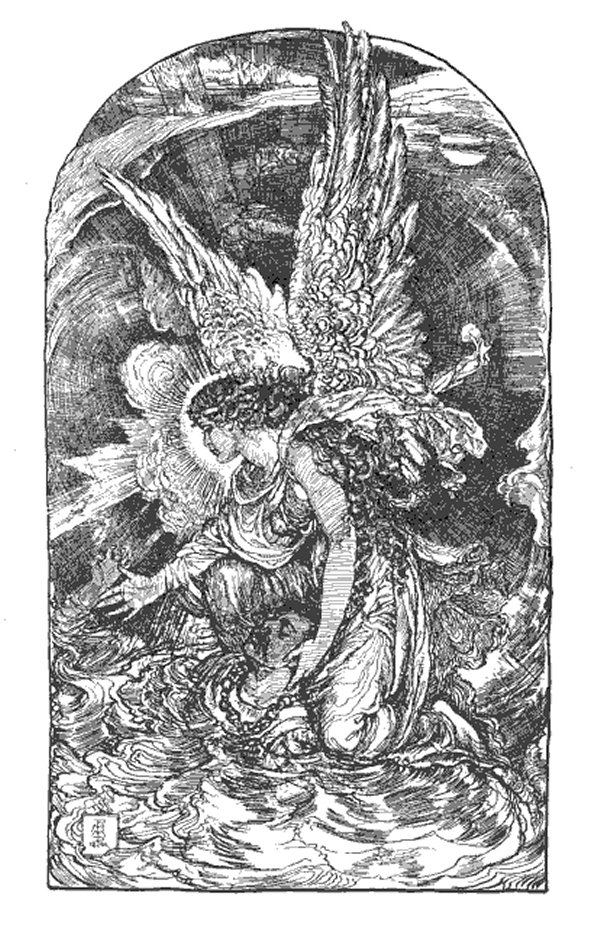
"Undine, generous-hearted and full of love, flies down as a dove" (Undine, 1897)

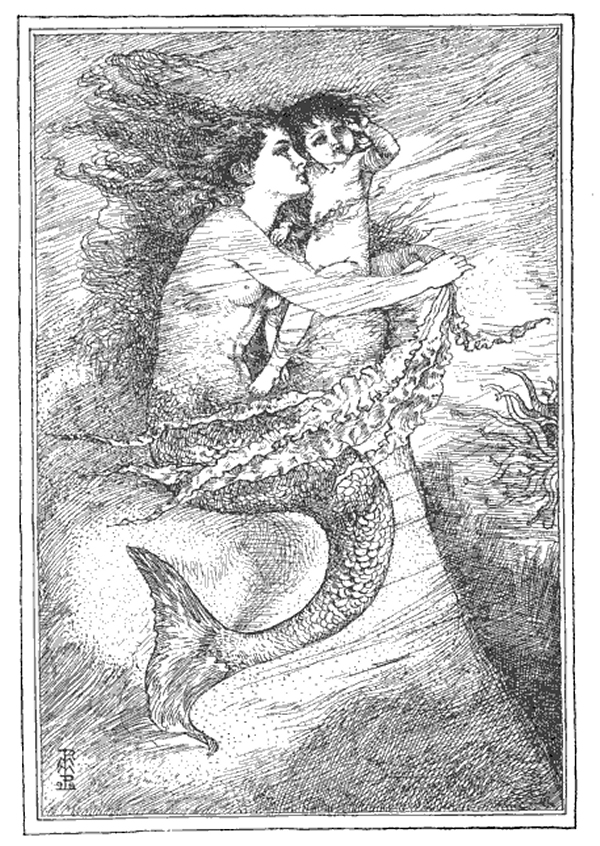
"The Unselfish Mermaid" (The Magic Nuts, 1898)
