= The Heir of Redclyffe =

1853 romantic novel by Charlotte M. Yonge

- Author: Charlotte M. Yonge
- Language: English
- Genre: Romance novel
- Publisher: John W. Parker
- Publication date: 1853
- Publication place: United Kingdom
- Media type: Print (Hardback)
- Pages: 574 pp

The Heir of Redclyffe, published in 1853, was the first of Charlotte M. Yonge's bestselling romantic novels. Its religious tone is derived from the High Church background of her family and from her friendship with a leading figure in the Oxford Movement, John Keble, who closely supervised the writing of the book. The germ of its plot was suggested by her friend Marianne Dyson. According to J. B. Priestley The Heir of Redclyffe was "the most popular novel of the whole age…Its popularity left Dickens and Thackeray far behind."

== Synopsis ==
The Heir of Redclyffe tells the story of Guy Morville, heir to the Redclyffe estate and baronetcy, and his cousin Philip Morville, a conceited hypocrite who enjoys an unwarrantedly high reputation, and of the two sisters whom they love, Amabel and Laura. When Guy raises money to secretly pay off the debts of his blackguard uncle, Philip spreads the rumour that Guy is a reckless gambler. As a result Guy's proposed marriage to Amabel (Amy), who is his guardian's daughter, is called off and he is disowned by his guardian. Guy bears the situation with a new-found Christian fortitude until the uncle clears his character, enabling him to marry Amy after all. They honeymoon in Italy, finding Philip there suffering from a life-threatening fever. Guy nurses him back to health, but catches the fever himself and dies. Philip, transformed by contrition, inherits Redclyffe and marries Laura. Amy has a daughter after her husband's death and says she is happy in her Christian faith and with her daughter.

== Readership ==
From the first The Heir of Redclyffe was a tremendous financial success, enabling Yonge to give the Bishop of New Zealand a sum of money to be spent on building a missionary ship, the Southern Cross. The novel's readership came from a wide social and intellectual range. Many readers were girls, as shown in Louisa May Alcott's Little Women, where Jo is found crying over the book. The author's brother Julian reported that nearly all the young men in his regiment had a copy. The teenaged George Saintsbury included Guy Morville in a list of "Things and Persons to be Adored". William Morris and Edward Burne-Jones, when students at Oxford, read the book aloud and decided to adopt the chivalric ideals of Guy Morville as part of the principles of the Pre-Raphaelite Brotherhood.

== Critical reception ==
The contemporary critic Henry James wrote disparagingly of the "semi-developed novels" read by women and their children, although "Occasionally, like the Heir of Redclyffe, they almost legitimate themselves by the force of genius. But this only when a first-rate mind takes the matter in hand." Other writers, however, were less indulgent than even that. Wilkie Collins reviewed it scathingly, declaring that "The characters by whose aid the story is worked out, are simply impossible. They have no types in nature, they never did have types in nature, and they never will have types in nature." Oscar Wilde, while touring America in 1882, spoke with a condemned criminal in a Nebraska jail who said he was reading Charlotte Yonge. Wilde commented later, "My heart was turned by the eyes of the doomed man, but if he reads The Heir of Redclyffe it's perhaps as well to let the law take its course."

== Influence on other works ==
Leo Tolstoy may have read The Heir of Redclyffe, if the critic John Sutherland is correct in detecting its influence on Anna Karenina.

The Heir of Redclyffe also played a role in the conversion of Abraham Kuyper, who saw himself in the character of Philip Morville. Kuyper said of the book, "This masterpiece was the instrument that broke my smug, rebellious heart."

The novel is mentioned in the 1941 book The Saturdays by Elizabeth Enright.

== Publication History. ==
The Heir of Redclyffe was first published, in two volumes, by the firm of John W. Parker in 1853. Two years later, the Leipzig publisher Bernhard Tauchnitz made it available in Germany. By 1878 it had reached a 23rd edition, and in the following year an edition illustrated by Kate Greenaway appeared. It was published by Everyman's Library in 1909 with an introduction by Alice Meynell, and by Oxford World's Classics in 1997 with introduction and notes by Barbara Dennis. A sequel called Amabel and Mary Verena by Mrs. Hicks Beach was published in 1944 by Faber and Faber; it has not been reprinted.

== See also ==
- Radcliffe, Iowa, a town named for the book.
- 1853 in literature
