= T. W. Rolleston =

Irish poet (1857–1920)

Thomas William Hazen Rolleston
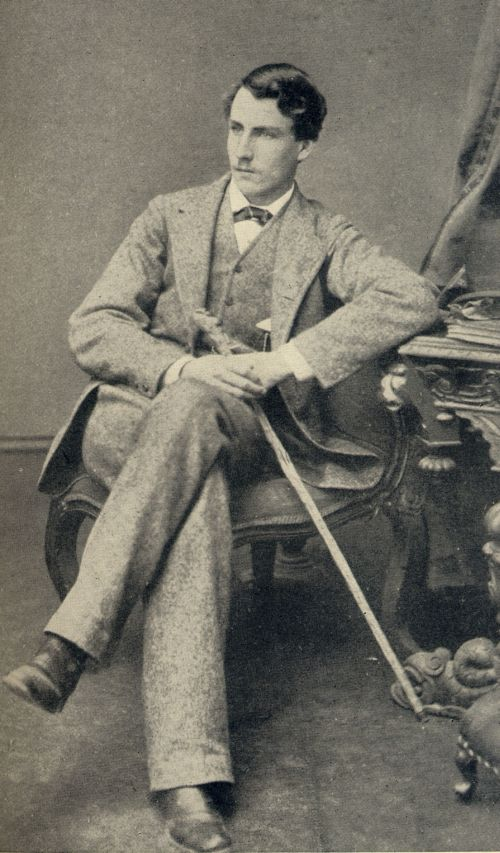
- Born: 1 May 1857; Shinrone, County Offaly, Ireland
- Died: 5 December 1920 (aged 63); Hampstead, London, United Kingdom
- Occupations: Poet, writer

Thomas William Hazen Rolleston (1 May 1857 – 5 December 1920) was an Irish writer, literary figure and translator, known as a poet but publishing over a wide range of literary and political topics. He lived at various times in Killiney in County Dublin, the German Empire, London and County Wicklow; settling finally in 1908 in Hampstead, London, where he died. His Killiney home, called Secrora, subsequently became the home of tennis player Joshua Pim.

== Early years ==
Rolleston was born in Glasshouse, Shinrone, County Offaly, the son of a judge. He was educated at St Columba's College, Dublin and Trinity College, Dublin.

== Career ==
After a time in the German Empire he founded the Dublin University Review in 1885; he published Poems and Ballads of Young Ireland (1888), and a Life of Lessing (1889). As the first managing director of the Irish Industries' Society, he helped preserve from extinction many Irish handicrafts, such as lacemaking, handmade tweeds, and glassmaking. In London in the 1890s he was one of the Rhymers' Club and a founder-member of the Irish Literary Society. He was to cross paths several times, and sometimes to clash, with W. B. Yeats, who described Rolleston in his memoirs as an "intimate enemy". He was also involved in Douglas Hyde's Gaelic League. He corresponded with the American poet Walt Whitman and, while living in Germany, sought to translate Whitman's Leaves of Grass into German and have it published there.

He also spent time as a journalist, and as a civil servant involved with agriculture. Because of his knowledge of the Irish language during the First World War he was employed as a librarian for the Ministry of Information's Irish and obscure languages censorship department.

== Family life ==
He had eight children, from two marriages. His first marriage was to Edith Caroline de Burgh (1859–1896), daughter of W. de Burgh, and his second, in 1897, was to Maud Henrietta Brooke (1866-1946), daughter of Stopford Brooke. He died unexpectedly at his home in the Hampstead area of London on December 5, 1920. He was interred at St John-at-Hampstead Churchyard.

== Works ==
Approximately 168 books are associated with Rolleston, some as writer or editor. These are the more prominent works; publication dates listed if known.

- The Teaching of Epictetus (1888)
- Life of Gotthold Ephraim Lessing (1889)
- Tannhauser: a dramatic poem by Richard Wagner (illustrated by Willy Pogany) (1900)
- A Treasury of Irish Poetry in the English Tongue by Stopford A. Brooke & T. W. Rolleston (1900)
- Parallel Paths: A Study in Biology, Ethics, and Art (1908)
- The High Deeds of Finn Mac Cumhail (1910)
- Celtic Myths and Legends also entitled Myths & Legends of the Celtic Race (1911, reprinted 1917, 1990)
  - The Illustrated Guide to Celtic Mythology. London: Studio Editions, 1993 (Based on Myths & Legends of the Celtic Race)
- Parsifal or, The Legend of the Holy Grail, retold from ancient sources with acknowledgement to the "Parsifal" of Richard Wagner (1912)
- The tale of Lohengrin, knight of the swan by Richard Wagner and T. W. Rolleston; illustrated by Willy Pogany (1913)
