= Mary Lamb =

English writer (1764–1847)

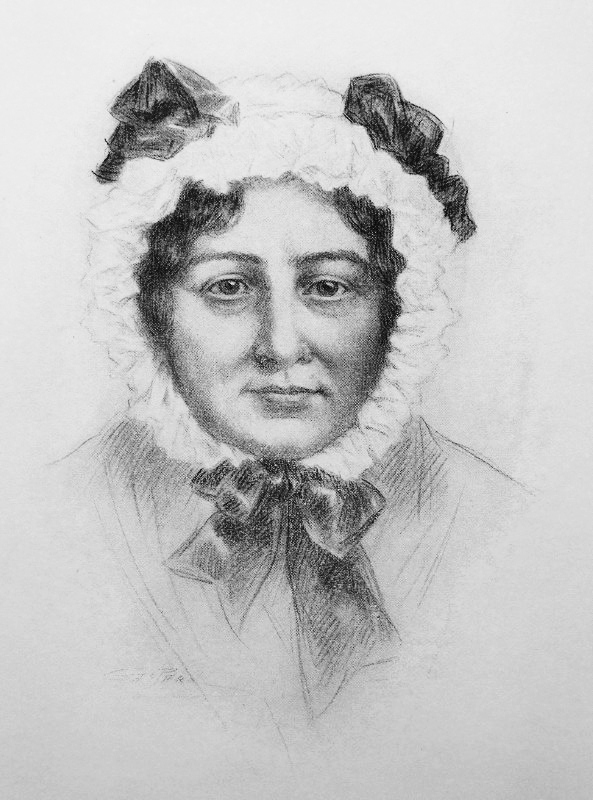
- Born: 3 December 1764; London, England
- Died: 20 May 1847 (aged 82); London, England
- Other name: Sempronia (pen name)
- Occupations: writer, poet
- Notable work: Tales from Shakespeare; Mrs. Leicester's School; Poems for Children
- Relatives: Charles Lamb (brother)

Mary Anne Lamb (3 December 1764 – 20 May 1847) was an English writer. She is best known for the collaboration with her brother Charles on the collection Tales from Shakespeare (1807). Mary suffered from mental illness, and in 1796, aged 31, she stabbed her mother to death during a mental breakdown. She was confined to mental facilities for most of her remaining life. She and Charles presided over a literary circle in London that included the poets William Wordsworth and Samuel Taylor Coleridge, among others.

== Early life ==
Mary Lamb was born in London on 3 December 1764, the third of seven children of John and Elizabeth Lamb. Her parents worked for Samuel Salt, a barrister in London, and the family lived above Salt in his home at 2 Crown Office Row in the Inner Temple. Only two of Mary's siblings survived: her older brother John Jr. and her younger brother Charles. Mary learned about literature and writers from her father's stories of the times he had seen Samuel Johnson, who lived nearby, and his visitors. Mary remembered seeing, at the age of five, the writer Oliver Goldsmith in the street, and she also witnessed David Garrick's acting. Her father may have taken her with him on his trips to the Pope's Head book shop nearby.

Samuel Salt died in 1792, and the Lambs had to move out of their lodgings soon afterwards (see tied accommodation). John Lamb continued to work in his old position in the Great Hall of the Inner Temple, where he had waited on Salt, but his wages were not sufficient to keep the lodgings that had been provided without cost by Salt. Samuel Salt left £600 to the Lambs, along with small annuities. They moved to a home in Little Queen Street, near High Holborn. Around this time, John Lamb had a stroke, losing most of the use of his left hand. John was allowed to continue receiving his salary while another man stood in for him in the Inner Temple, performing his duties. This arrangement lasted until John's death in 1799.

In the early 1790s, Elizabeth Lamb began to experience debilitating pain, possibly from arthritis, which ended up crippling her. Mary, the only other person at home during the day, took responsibility for her mother's care. By 1796, Elizabeth was completely helpless and dependent on Mary. John's sister Sarah Lamb also lived with the family, and her care was spread between Charles and Mary. In 1795 Charles had a mental breakdown, and spent the end of 1795 to the beginning of 1796 in a private mental facility. During this time, Mary worked as a seamstress, along with a little girl who served as her apprentice. The responsibilities and expectations placed on Mary began to be a serious burden for her toward the end of 1796. Her father had become senile, her mother required constant care, and her brother John had had an accident, and had moved back in with the family, so that he too could be cared for by her. Mary may also have had difficulties in training her young apprentice. The situation began to affect her mental stability.

== Murder of Elizabeth Lamb ==
On 22 September 1796, while preparing dinner, Mary became angry with her apprentice, roughly shoving the little girl out of her way and pushing her into another room. Elizabeth began shouting at her for this. Mary suffered a mental break-down as her mother continued shouting at her. She took the kitchen knife she had been holding, unsheathed it, and approached her mother, who was sitting down. She then fatally stabbed her mother in the chest, in full view of John and Sarah Lamb who were standing nearby. Charles ran into the house soon after the murder and took the knife out of Mary's hand.

Later in the evening Mary was confined in a local mental facility called Fisher House, in Islington, a place found for her by Charles through a doctor friend of his. Charles took over responsibility for Mary after refusing his brother John's suggestion that they have her committed to a public facility. A few days later, the murder was reported in the newspapers. The coroner had returned a verdict of lunacy. A month after the murder, while still at Fisher House, Mary told Charles she had come to terms with her guilt over the murder, and felt that she had for the most part been a good and faithful daughter.

== Middle years ==
Six months after the murder, Charles removed Mary from Fisher House and brought her to live in a house in the village of Hackney, not far from London. Charles spent his Sundays and holidays with Mary, leaving her in the care of his landlords for the rest of the time. Mary continued to work as a seamstress, and subscribed to the local lending libraries, as she was a voracious reader throughout her life. Charles's poem "Written on Christmas Day, 1797" demonstrated his feelings toward his sister, to whom he had made a lifelong commitment. On 13 April 1799 John Lamb died. Sarah Lamb had died in 1797, and with John's death, Charles was able to bring Mary back to London to live with him. They both decided that they would remain unmarried and live together for the rest of their lives, in a state described by Charles as "a sort of double singleness".

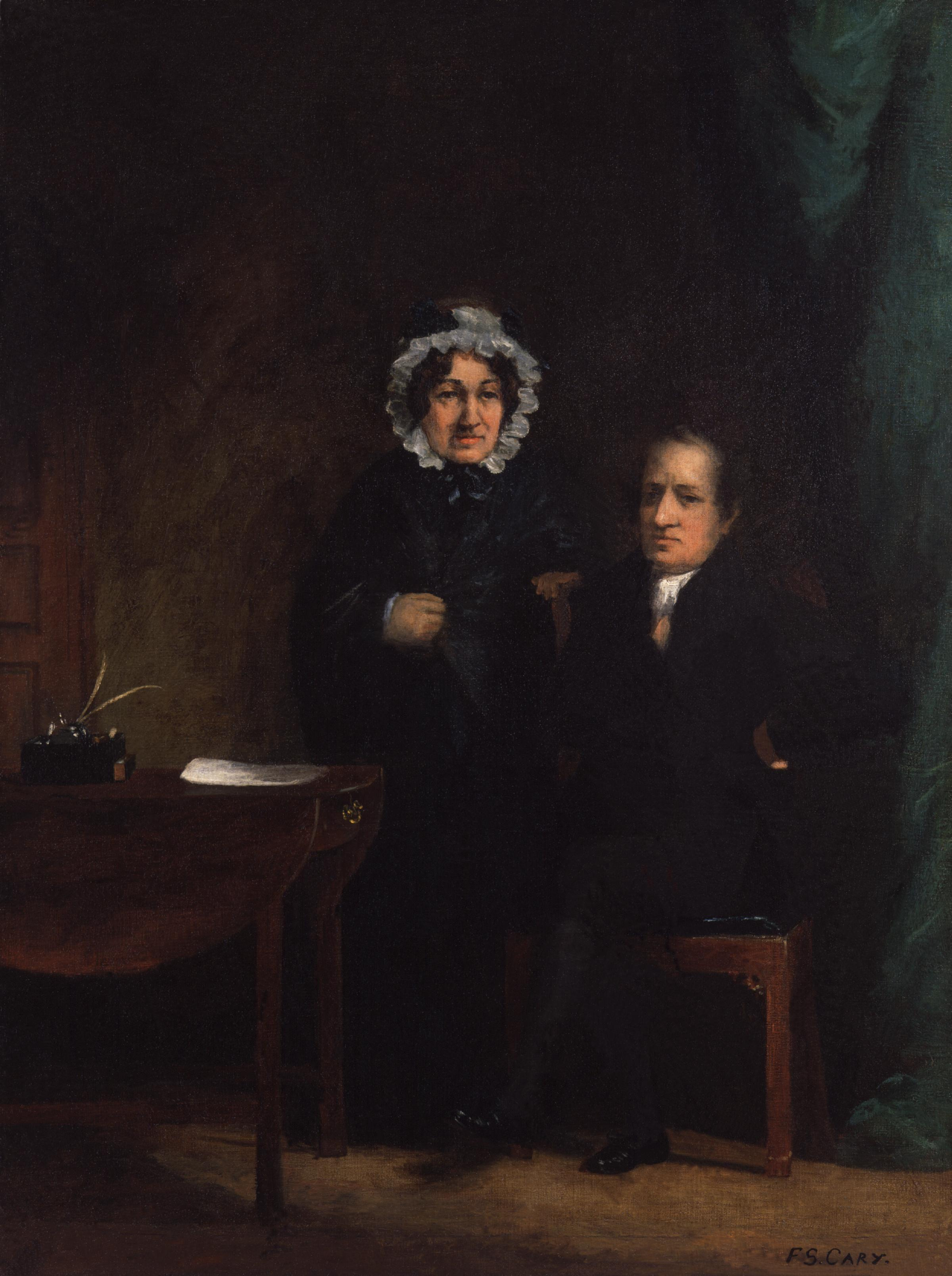
Portrait of Mary with her brother Charles by Francis Stephen Cary, 1834

In 1800, after the death of their housekeeper, Mary had to be confined again for a month. Through the rest of her life, Mary occasionally spent time in mental facilities when she or Charles felt that her mental derangement was returning. Over time, Mary and Charles rebuilt the very close and loving relationship they had had before their mother's death. In his essay "Mackery End", Charles wrote that "We are both of us inclined to be a little too positive...But where we have differed upon moral points; upon something proper to be done, or let alone; whatever heat of opposition, or steadiness of conviction, I set out with, I am sure always, in the long run, to be brought over to her way of thinking." Her sense of humour was so little developed, as compared with her brother's, that he described a play on words she made at the age of 50 as being her first joke.

In 1801, the Lambs formed a literary and social circle that included minor artists and writers, and occasional visits from Charles's friends Samuel Taylor Coleridge and William Wordsworth. At this time, Mary also met two of the best female friends of her life, Sarah Stoddart and Dorothy Wordsworth. Charles began drinking heavily around this time, a problem that followed him until his death. Mary patiently watched over Charles when he was drunk, just as he had always watched over her.

In 1806, William Godwin (Mary Wollstonecraft's widower) and his second wife Mary Jane Godwin (mother of Claire Clairmont), who had become close with the Lambs through their shared literary work of the past few years, asked Mary to write something for their Juvenile Library. This was the beginning of Charles and Mary's collaboration on Tales from Shakespeare. During the writing of the Tales, Mary realised that she could make a living writing these types of works for children. The finished collection of Tales was published in 1807, with a second edition coming out in 1809. Artists who made illustrations for the Tales included William Mulready and the poet William Blake. In 1808 the Lambs developed a closer friendship with an earlier acquaintance, William Hazlitt, who had recently married Mary's friend Sarah Stoddart, sister of the journalist John Stoddart.

Mary began writing her collection of tales Mrs. Leicester's School in 1808, publishing it at the end of the year, but the original title page stated the date as 1809. According to Charles, the work was mostly Mary's with only a small collaborative effort by him. The narrators in the stories of this collection are often children who have lost parents, and several of the stories deal with loss, grief, and emotions that make the book more intense than contemporary children's fiction. The book had gone through nine editions by 1825. In 1810 Charles and Mary published another collaboration, Poems for Children. Their writing brought them financial security and vaulted them solidly into the middle class. Mary had difficulties adjusting to middle-class life, as she had to hire and govern servants though she was used to doing household work herself.

== Later life ==
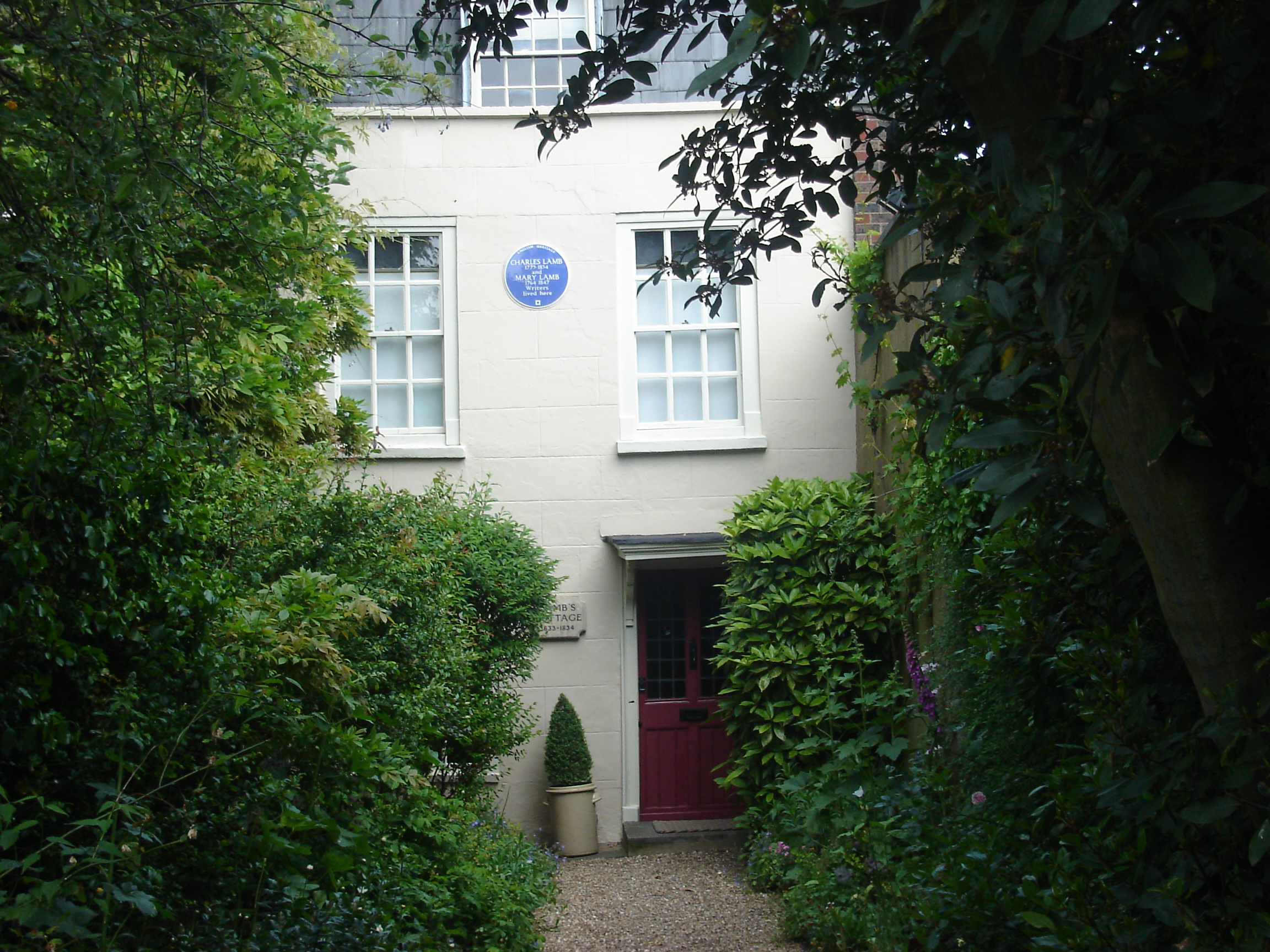
The Lambs' home in Edmonton

In December 1814, Mary wrote an article titled "On Needle-work", published in the New British Lady's Magazine the following year under the pseudonym Sempronia. The article argued that sewing should be made a recognised profession to give independence to women whose only skill and way of making a living was sewing, which at the time was something they were mostly obliged to do as part of their household duties. Mary had a relapse of her mental illness soon after publication of the article. In 1820, Charles began writing of the Essays of Elia, in some of which he described her under the name of Bridget Elia. At this time his and Mary's literary gatherings grew in importance, with new members joining the circle including Thomas Noon Talfourd and Bryan Procter.

In 1820, they met a young girl named Emma Isola, who may have been introduced to them by William Wordsworth. Emma stayed with the Lambs several times over the next few years. After her father's death in 1823, when she was 14, Emma was adopted by the Lambs. She spent five happy years with them until finding a position as a governess. During the time that the three lived together, the Lambs moved to a country house. In 1825, Charles resigned from his position at the East India House. In the later 1820s Mary's mental illness progressed, her periods of dementia lasting longer and becoming deeper, while new symptoms of depression and detachment appeared. Charles's health became more infirm as well through these years.

In 1833, Mary moved to a house for mentally ill people in Edmonton, Middlesex; Charles soon followed. Charles never lost his love and devotion for his sister, even as her illness continued to worsen. "I could be nowhere happier than under the same roof as her," he said in 1834. The death of Coleridge in July 1834 was a great blow to Charles. Charles died on 27 December 1834. According to family friend Henry Crabb Robinson, Mary was "quite insane" at this time and unable to fully feel grief at the death of her brother, but she recovered so far as to be able to persuade Wordsworth to write lines for her brother's memorial stone.

Mary lived on at Edmonton until 1842 when she moved with her nurses to a house in London. She exchanged visits with friends when her mind was strong enough, but her hearing deteriorated in the mid-1840s, making it difficult for her to communicate with others. She died on 20 May 1847, and she was buried next to her brother in the Edmonton Churchyard in Middlesex.

== Legacy ==
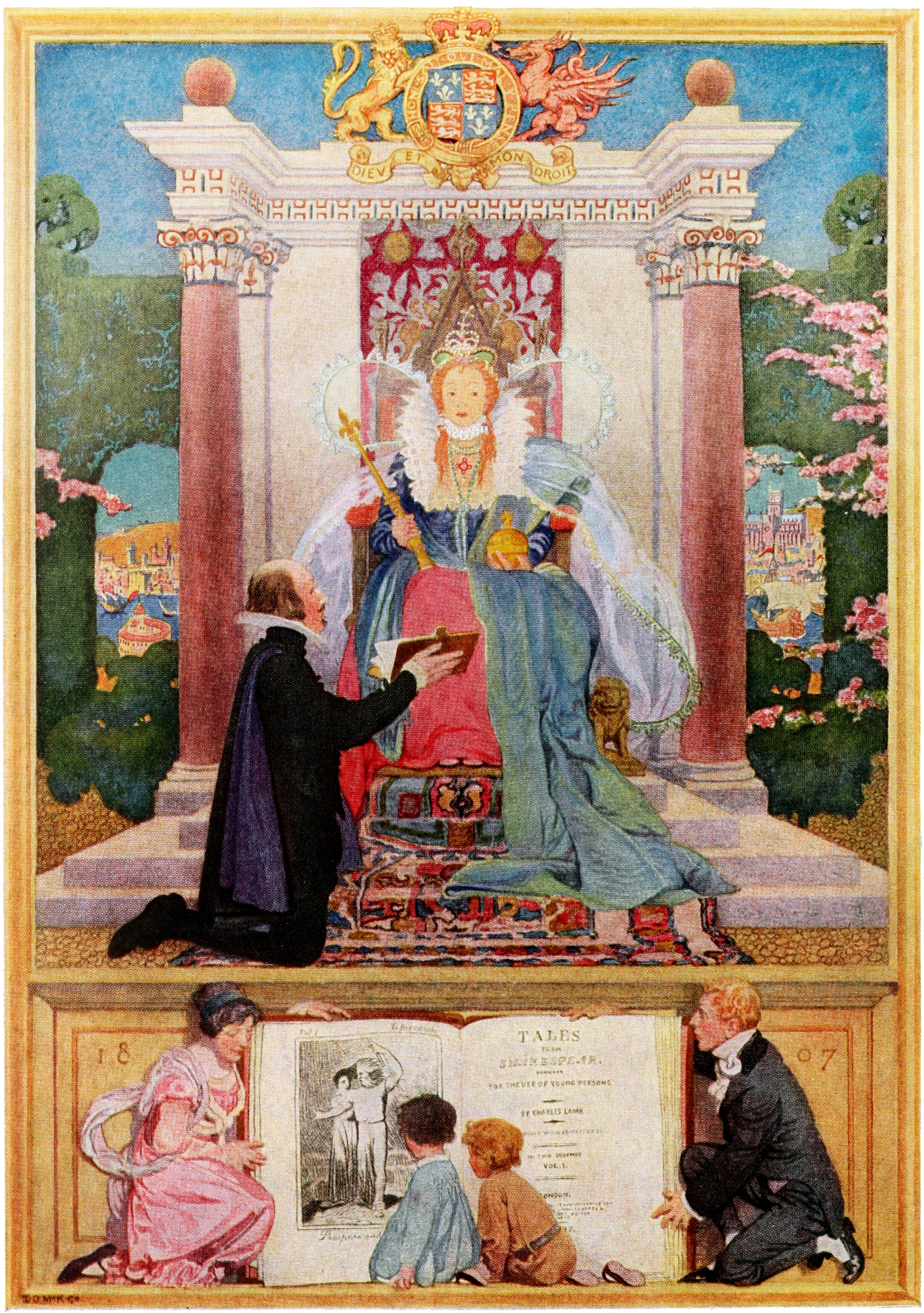
1922 frontispiece illustration for Tales from Shakespeare

Choosing A Name

I HAVE got a new-born sister;
I was nigh the first that kissed her.
When the nursing-woman brought her
To papa, his infant daughter,
How papa's dear eyes did glisten! -
She will shortly be to christen;
And papa has made the offer,
I shall have the naming of her.

Now I wonder what would please her, -
Charlotte, Julia, or Louisa?
Ann and Mary, they're too common;
Joan's too formal for a woman;
Jane's a prettier name beside;
But we had a Jane that died.
They would say, if 't was Rebecca,
That she was a little Quaker.
Edith's pretty, but that looks
Better in old English books;
Ellen's left off long ago;
Blanche is out of fashion now.
None that I have named as yet
Are so good as Margaret.
Emily is neat and fine;
What do you think of Caroline?
How I'm puzzled and perplexed
What to choose or think of next!
I am in a little fever
Lest the name that I should give her
Should disgrace her or defame her; -
I will leave papa to name her.

— By Mary Lamb

At the time of her death, few people outside of hers and her brother's immediate circle of friends knew about either her mental problems or the circumstances of her mother's death. Their friend Talfourd soon published a memoir of the Lambs carefully and respectfully giving details of Mary's mental condition while praising her as a friend and writer. One intention of Talfourd's was to boost the reputation of Charles by showing how much he had done for his beloved sister. He said that Mary was "remarkable for the sweetness of her disposition, the clearness of her understanding, and the gentle wisdom of all her acts and words", and that "To a friend in any difficulty she was the most comfortable of advisers, the wisest of consolers." Hazlitt called her the one thoroughly reasonable woman he had ever met. She was, in fact, a favourite among Charles's literary friends. Nevertheless, periodicals of the time, such as the British Quarterly Review, did not write about her with the same kindness and respect.

In 1913, the U.S. writer Willis J. Abbot gave her an article in his book Notable women in history.

Charles and Mary Lamb's story was explored by Dorothy Parker and Ross Evans in their 1949 play The Coast of Illyria. Mary was depicted as the central character in The Lambs of London (2004), a novel by Peter Ackroyd. She is also the subject of a 2004 biographical study by British writer Kathy Watson, The Devil Kissed Her, and a 2005 biography by Susan Tyler Hitchcock, Mad Mary Lamb: Lunacy And Murder In Literary London. She appears in the first chapter of Mad, Bad, & Sad, Lisa Appignanesi's book on women and mental illness. The Lambs appear in one episode of Sue Limb's radio comedy The Wordsmiths at Gorsemere, a pastiche of the poet William Wordsworth and his circle at Grasmere.

An essay on Charles and Mary Lamb, titled "The Unfuzzy Lamb", appeared in Anne Fadiman's book At Large and at Small: Familiar Essays (2007).
