= Juliana Horatia Ewing =

English writer (1841–1885)

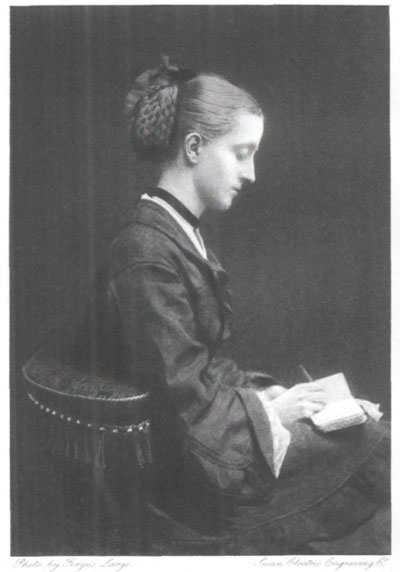
- Born: 3 August 1841; Ecclesfield, Sheffield, England
- Died: 13 May 1885 (aged 43); Bath, Somerset, England
- Occupation: Writer
- Writing career
- Period: 19th century
- Genre: Children's literature

Juliana Horatia Ewing (née Gatty, 3 August 1841 – 13 May 1885) was an English writer of children's stories. Her writings display a sympathetic insight into children's lives, an admiration for things military, and a strong religious faith.

== Life ==
Known as Julie, she was the second of ten children of the Rev. Alfred Gatty, Vicar of Ecclesfield in Yorkshire, and Margaret Gatty, who was herself a children's author. Their children were educated mainly by their mother, but Julie was often the driving force behind their various activities: drama, botany and so on. Later she was responsible for setting up a village library in Ecclesfield, and helped out in the parish with her three sisters. Early stories of hers appeared in Charlotte Mary Yonge's magazine The Monthly Packet.

On 1 June 1867, Julie married Major Alexander Ewing (1830–1895) of the Army Pay Corps. A musician, composer and translator, he was also a keen churchgoer and shared his wife's interest in literature. Within a week of their marriage, the Ewings left England for Fredericton, New Brunswick, Canada, where he had received a new posting. They remained there for two years, before returning to England in 1869 and spending eight years in the army town of Aldershot. Although her husband was sent overseas again, to Malta in 1879 and Sri Lanka in 1881, Ewing's poor health precluded her from accompanying him.

On her husband's return in 1883, the Ewings moved to Trull, Somerset, and then in 1885 to Bath, in the hopes that the change of air would do her good. However, her health continued to decline. After two operations, she died in Bath on 13 May 1885. She was given a military funeral at Trull three days later.

Julie's sister Horatia Katharine Frances Gatty (1846–1945) published a memorial of her life and works, which includes a publication history of her stories. A later selection includes some of Julie's letters and drawings about Canada. A biography of her by Gillian Avery appeared in 1961.

== "Child-novels" ==
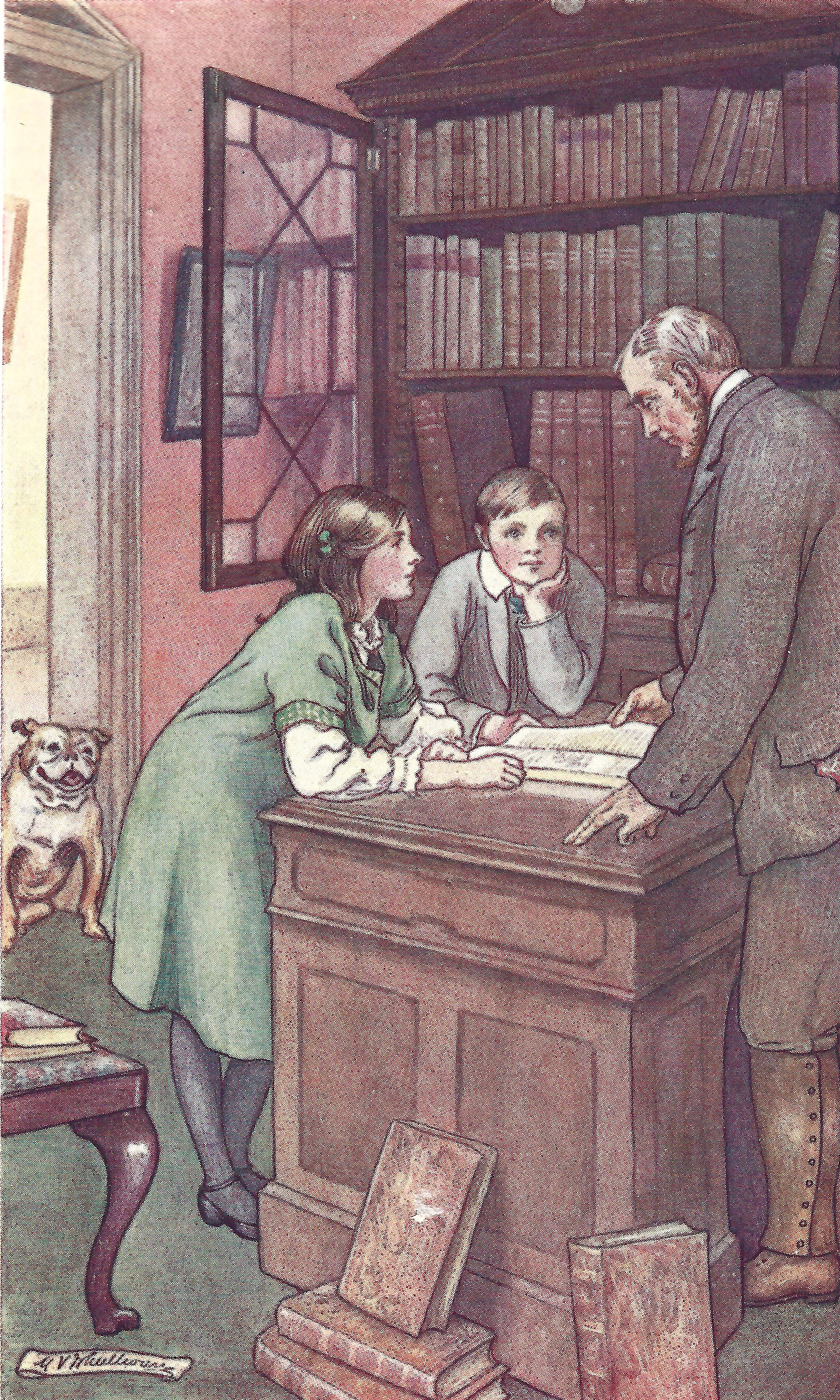
Frontispiece by Mary Wheelhouse in Ewing's Mary's Meadow, London: G. Bell and Sons, 1915

Roger Lancelyn Green calls Ewing's works the "first outstanding child-novels" in English literature. They show notably sympathetic insight into child life, admiration for things military, and a reflection of Ewing's strong Anglican faith. They include Mrs. Overtheway's Remembrances (1869), A Flat Iron for a Farthing (1873), Six to Sixteen (1875), Jackanapes (1884), Daddy Darwin's Dovecot (1884), and The Story of a Short Life (1885).

A talented artist herself, Ewing's works were frequently illustrated by such notable figures as George Cruikshank and Randolph Caldecott. She was also the editor of a number of magazines which published short stories for children, such as the Nursery Magazine from 1856 onwards, the Monthly Packet, and the monthly Aunt Judy's Magazine from 1866.

== Legacy ==
The Story of a Short Life inspired Grace Kimmins to start the Guild of the Brave Poor Things to help children with disabilities in London. Grace and later Ada Vachell took their motto Laetus sorte mea (Happy in my lot) from Ewing's book. Her Madam Liberality (1873) has been taken to be autobiographical.

Rudyard Kipling declared he knew Ewing's novel Jan of the Windmill (1872–1873, 1876) almost by heart. He wrote in his autobiography, Something of Myself: "One [book] I have still, a bound copy of Aunt Judy's Magazine of the early 'seventies, in which appeared Mrs. Ewing's "Six to Sixteen". I owe more in circuitous ways to that tale than I can tell. I knew it, as I know it still, almost by heart. Here was a history of real people and real things." Her story The Brownies (1865) gave the Baden-Powells the idea and the name for the junior level of the Girl Guides. Another admirer of her work was E. Nesbit, herself a prominent children's author.

In 1899 a stained-glass window by Charles Eamer Kempe in memory of Alexander and Juliana Horatia Ewing was installed in the Church of All Saints, Trull, overlooking their graves.
