= The Cuckoo Clock =

1877 children's fantasy novel by Mary Molesworth

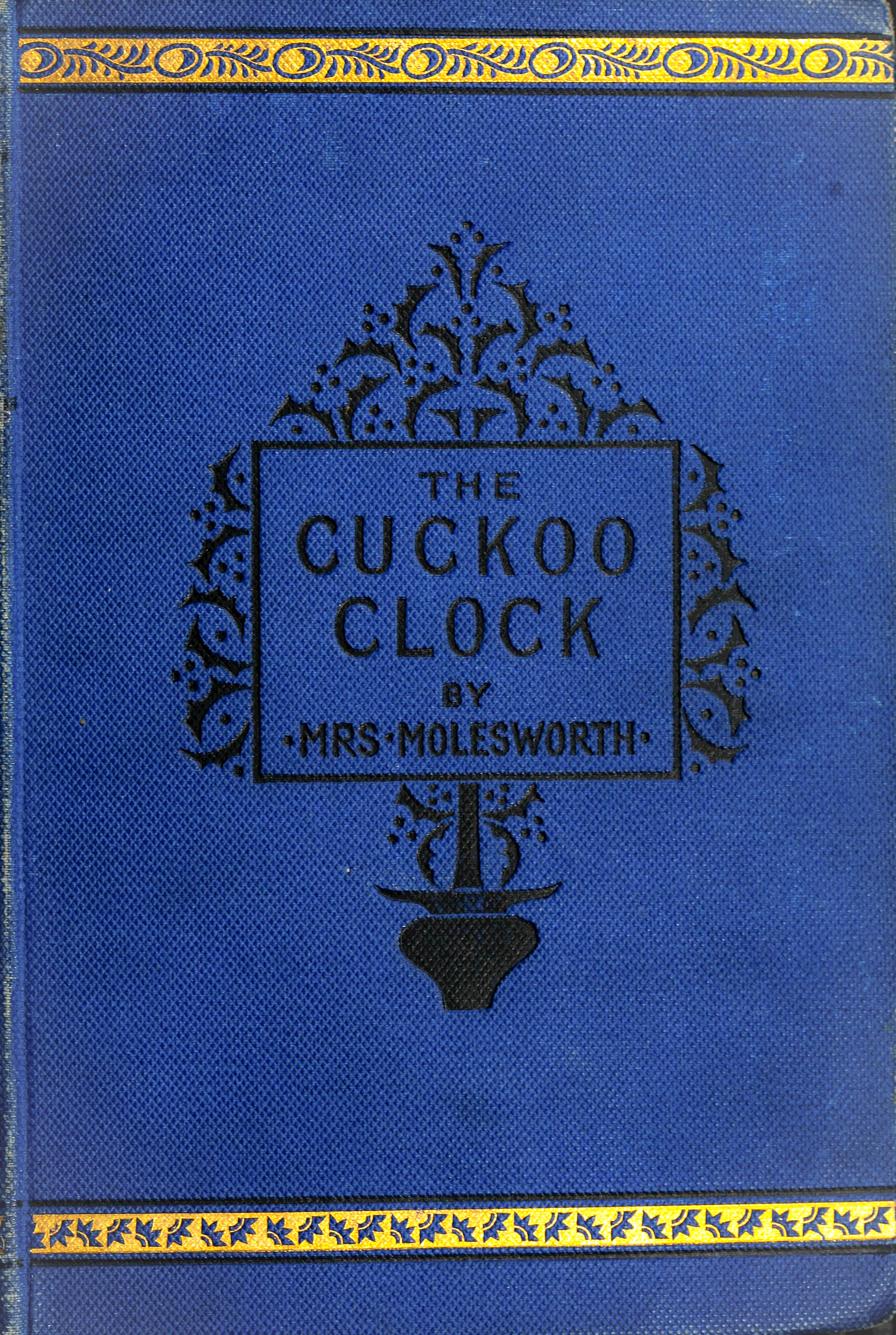
- Front cover of the first edition published as by Mrs. Molesworth, 1882
- Author: Mary Louisa Molesworth
- Illustrator: Walter Crane
- Genre: Children's novel, fantasy
- Publisher: Macmillan and Co.
- Publication date: 1877
- Publication place: United Kingdom
- Pages: 242 (first edition)
- OCLC: 6219054
- LC Class: PZ7.M732 Cu4 (1914)
- Text: The Cuckoo Clock at Wikisource

The Cuckoo Clock is a British children's fantasy novel by Mary Louisa Molesworth, published in 1877 by Macmillan. It was originally published under the pen name Ennis Graham and reissued in 1882 as by Mrs. Molesworth, the name by which she is widely known. Both of those editions and many later ones were illustrated by Walter Crane; an 1893 uniform edition is available online at the University of Pennsylvania. An edition illustrated by Maria L. Kirk was published in 1914; it is available online at HathiTrust Digital Library.

== Plot summary ==
A small child, Griselda, and a cuckoo from a cuckoo clock become unlikely friends. At night the clock transports her to magical places.

== Genre and style ==
Mrs. Molesworth's writing style is known to be very plain in context, and it has been criticized for this. But the plain text was most likely used to make the work more accessible to children. Nothing she writes is too complicated for the readers, and there is an air of conversation in the text.

== Themes ==
=== Love and friendship ===
Throughout the novel Griselda struggles with her new place of residence. She quickly finds that what she needs most is friendship. She finds these friends first in the Cuckoo, then her maids, and finally she finds a real friend in Master Phil. It is also realized at the end that throughout the novel her aunts have been showing her examples of real love all along.

=== Magic in fiction ===
This particular use of magic is through an enchanted object. The plot is furthered easily with the assumption that the object has no bounds of possibility. Children readers are also led to use their imagination to see all of the images the writer has concocted.

=== Sacrifices bring reward ===
Throughout the story Griselda struggles to finish her lessons during the day. The Cuckoo helps her to learn that with hard work there is eventually a reward. He rewards her greatly when she has improved in her lessons.

== 19th century children's literature ==
The second half of the 19th century is called the Golden age of children’s literature, because of the publication of so many notable stories that also appear in modern times. The fantasy novel for children was becoming very popular at this time. The Moral Didactic tale also continued with the popularity of the fantasy story. Often overlapping.

=== The didactic tale ===
The character of Griselda, has many interesting qualities. She is seen as a real child, who throws fits and is unhappy when she does not get her way. The Cuckoo, through these stories, teaches young Griselda how to control her feelings and urges. Learning the proper way to act is a major theme in many British children's books. Many books written in that age were meant for the betterment of the children reading them.

== Critical reception ==
A review of The Cuckoo Clock from The Pall Mall Gazette can be found in some copies of Molesworth's The Tapestry Room:

"A beautiful little story... It will be read with delight by every child into whose hands it is placed... Ennis Graham deserves all that praise that has been, is, and will be, bestowed on The Cuckoo Clock. Children's stories are plentiful, but one like this not to be met with every day."
