= The Carved Lions =

- 1964 Edition, J.M. Dent & Sons, Ltd., London
- Author: Mary Louisa Molesworth
- Language: English
- Genre: Novel
- Publisher: Macmillan and Company, London
- Publication date: 1895
- Publication place: United Kingdom
- Media type: Print (Hardcover)
- Pages: 144 pp (in J.M. Dent edition)

The Carved Lions (1895) is a book by British author Mary Louisa Molesworth (Mrs. Molesworth). The book was first published by Macmillan and Company, London.

== Plot ==
The story features the interaction between the children of the household and a pair of lions carved in wood, who come to life and take care of them.
