= L. P. Jacks =

Lawrence Pearsall Jacks
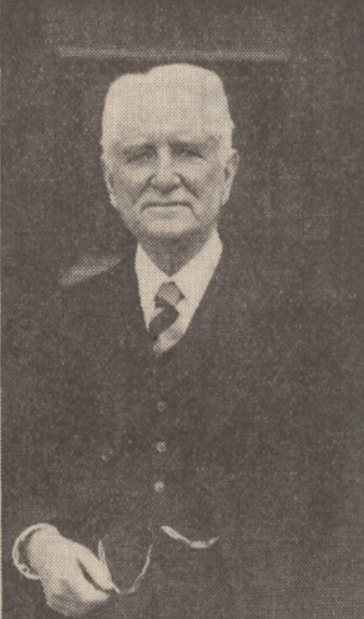
- Born: 9 October 1860; Nottingham, England
- Died: 17 February 1955 (aged 94); Oxford, England
- Occupations: Philosopher, Unitarian minister

Lawrence Pearsall Jacks (9 October 1860 – 17 February 1955), abbreviated L. P. Jacks, was an English educator, philosopher, and Unitarian minister who rose to prominence in the period from World War I to World War II.

== Early life ==
Jacks was born on 9 October 1860 in Nottingham. In 1882, he enrolled in Manchester New College (which then was in London). After graduating with a M.A. in 1886, he spent a year at Harvard University, where he studied with the philosopher Josiah Royce. In 1887, he became assistant minister to Stopford Brooke in his chapel in Bloomsbury, London. He served as assistant minister for a year, and then accepted a position as Unitarian minister for Renshaw Street Unitarian Chapel in Liverpool.

In 1889 Jacks married Olive Brooke, the daughter of Stopford Brooke. They had six children together. During this time, Jacks' circle of associates included George Bernard Shaw, Sidney and Beatrice Webb, and Oscar Wilde. Jacks was appointed minister for the Church of the Messiah, Birmingham in 1894.

== Oxford ==
Jacks served as Principal of Manchester College, which was by then based in Oxford, from 1915 until his retirement in 1931.

Jacks served as the editor of the Hibbert Journal from its founding in 1902 until 1948. Under his editorship the Journal became one of the leading forums in England for work in philosophy and religion, and introduced the work of Alfred Loisy to British readers. In September 1915, he wrote in support of the war effort, citing the need to defeat German militarism and defend "the liberties of our race." His article, titled "The Peacefulness of Being at War" in The New Republic, argued that the war had "brought to England a peace of mind such as she had not possessed for decades," claiming that the sense of common purpose brought on by the war had overcome social fragmentation and improved English life. Jacks was interested in parapsychology and was President for the Society for Psychical Research (1917–1918).

After the war, Jacks wrote prolifically and gained popularity as a lecturer in Britain and America. He frequently returned to the theme of militarism and the "mechanical" mindset, which he regarded as one of the greatest threats in modern life. In his Revolt Against Mechanism (1933), he wrote that "The mechanical mind has a passion for control—of everything except itself. Beyond the control it has won over the forces of nature it would now win control over the forces of society of stating the problem and producing the solution, with social machinery to correspond." He proposed liberal education and world vision as a hope for salvation from the mechanistic world, in books such as his Education for the Whole Man (1931) and his 1938 BBC Radio Lectures. In 1922 Jacks hosted Austrian philosopher, Dr Rudolf Steiner, to present a conference at Manchester College on values in education and to share the experiences of the model Waldorf school at Stuttgart. In his article "A Demilitarized League of Nations", ("Hibbert Journal", August 1936) Jacks argued the League of Nations should completely eschew military force.

Although he continued to preach Unitarianism, he became increasingly critical of all forms of institutional religion and denominationalism, and refused to let his name be added to a list of Unitarian ministers published by the General Assembly of Unitarian and Free Christian Churches in 1928. He accepted an invitation to preach in Liverpool Cathedral in 1933; a Convocation of the Church of England rebuked the cathedral for allowing a Unitarian to preach, igniting a controversy in the press.

Jacks published prolifically over a period of fifty years, including philosophical and visionary treatises, biographies, articles, and moral parables. He died in Oxford on 17 February 1955, at the age of 94.

== Works ==
- Mad Shepherds and Other Human Studies (1910)
- The Alchemy of Thought (1910)
- Among the Idolmakers (1911)
- All Men Are Ghosts (1913)
- From the Human End (1916)
- Life and Letters of Stopford Brooke (1917)
- The Legends of Smokeover (1921)
- Religious Perplexities (1922)
- A Living Universe (1924)
- Realities and Shams (1924)
- The Faith of a Worker (1925)
- The Heroes of Smokeover (1926)
- The Magic Formula and Other Stories (1927)
- Constructive Citizenship (1927)
- My Neighbour the Universe: A Study of Human Labour (1929)
- The Inner Sentinel: A Study of Ourselves (1930)
- Education for the Whole Man (1931)
- Education Through Recreation (1932)
- Revolt Against Mechanism (1933)
- Co-operation or Coercion? (1938)
- The Last Legend of Smokeover (1939)
- Near the Brink: Observations of a Nonagenarian (1952)

== Articles ==
- "The Universe as Philosopher," The Hibbert Journal, Vol. VI, October 1907/July 1908.
- "The Alchemy of Thought," The Hibbert Journal, Vol. VI, October 1907/July 1908.
- "A Psychologist Among the Saints," The Hibbert Journal, Vol. X, October 1911/July 1912.
- "Democracy and Discipline," The Hibbert Journal, Vol. XI, October 1912/ July 1913.
- "Does Consciousness 'Evolve'?," The Hibbert Journal, Vol. XI, October 1912/ July 1913.
- "Mechanism, Diabolism and the War," The Hibbert Journal, Vol. XIII, October 1914/July 1915.
- "The Tyranny of Mere Things," The Hibbert Journal, Vol. XIII, October 1914/July 1915.
- "A Theological Holiday — and After," The Hibbert Journal, Vol. XIV, October 1915/July 1916.
- "An Interim Religion," The Hibbert Journal, Vol. XIV, October 1915/July 1916.
- "The Insane Root," The Atlantic Monthly, Vol. CXIX, 1917.
- "Punishment and Reconstruction," The Hibbert Journal, Vol. XV, October 1916/July 1917.
- "The Theory of Survival in the Light of its Context," The Hibbert Journal, Vol. XV, October 1916/July 1917.
- "The War-Made Empires and the Martial Races of the Western World," The Hibbert Journal, Vol. XVI, 1917/1918.
- "Loyalty Once More," The Atlantic Monthly, Vol. CXXI, 1918.
- "Arms and Men: A Study in Habit," The Hibbert Journal, Vol. XVI, October 1918/July 1919.
- "International Control of War Finance," The Hibbert Journal, Vol. XVI, October 1918/July 1919.
- "Why We Are Disappointed," The Hibbert Journal, Vol. XVIII, October 1919/July 1920.
- "The International Mind," The Atlantic Monthly, Vol. 125, 1920.
- "A League of Nations as a League of Governments?" The Atlantic Monthly, Vol. 131, No. 2, February 1923.
