= Mary Wheelhouse =

British painter, illustrator, toymaker, suffragette (1868–1947)

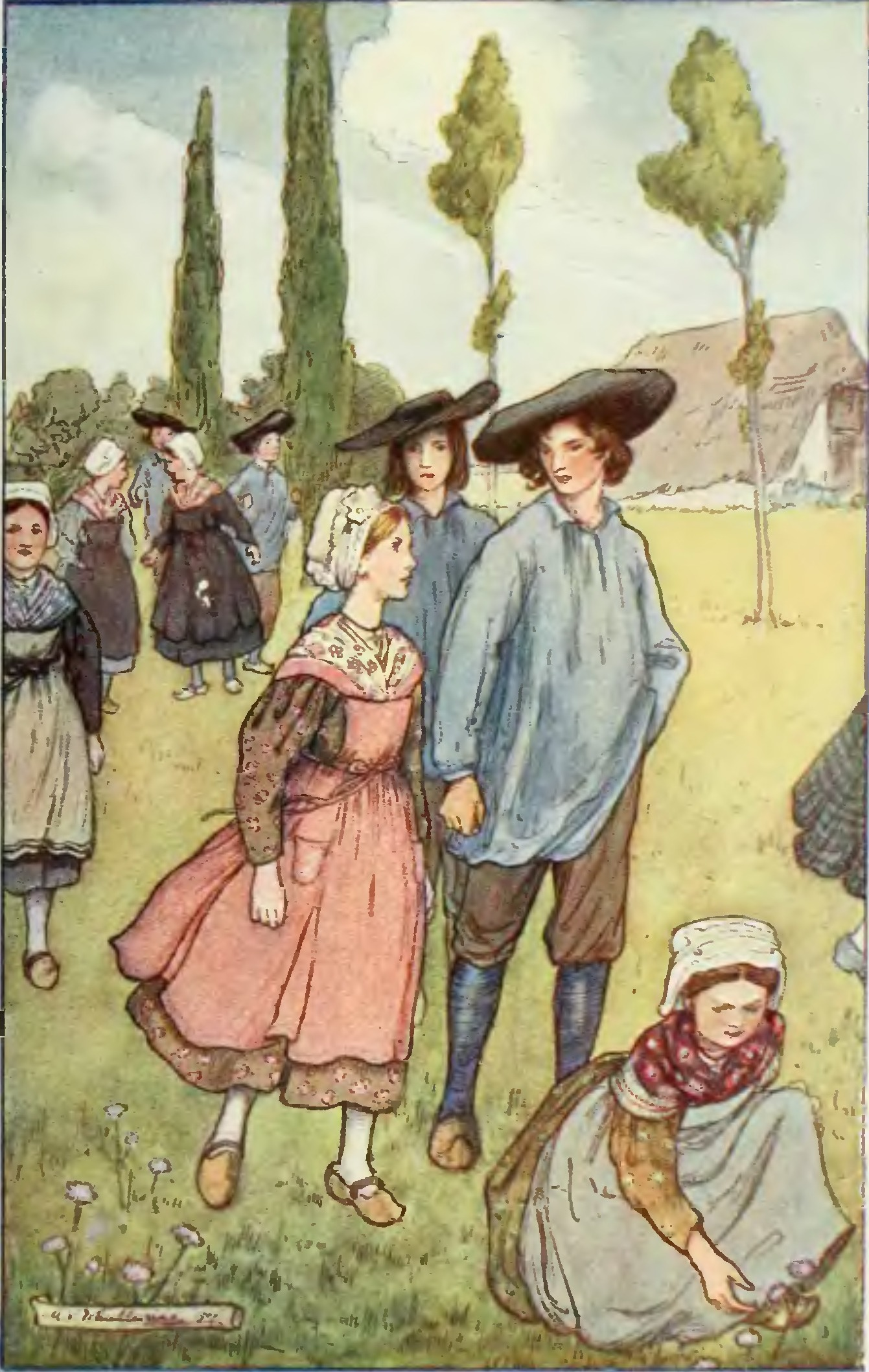
Illustration by Mary Wheelhouse in George Sand's novel Les Maîtres Sonneurs (The Bagpipers), London, 1908

Mary Vermuyden Wheelhouse (12 December 1867 – c. 1947) (Note: Dates vary in the sources.) was an English painter, illustrator, toymaker and suffragist. She was a member of organisations including the Women's International Art Club (WIAC) and the Artists' Suffrage League (ASL).

== Early life and education ==
Wheelhouse was born on 12 December 1867 in Leeds, West Yorkshire. She was the youngest of three sisters and her elder sister Ethel Hamerton Wheelhouse (born 1865) became a professional violinist.

Her father was physician at Leeds Public Dispensary and photographer Claudius Galen Wheelhouse, who became the president of the council of the British Medical Association. Her mother was wife Agnes Caroline Wheelhouse (née Cowell), the daughter of a Reverend.

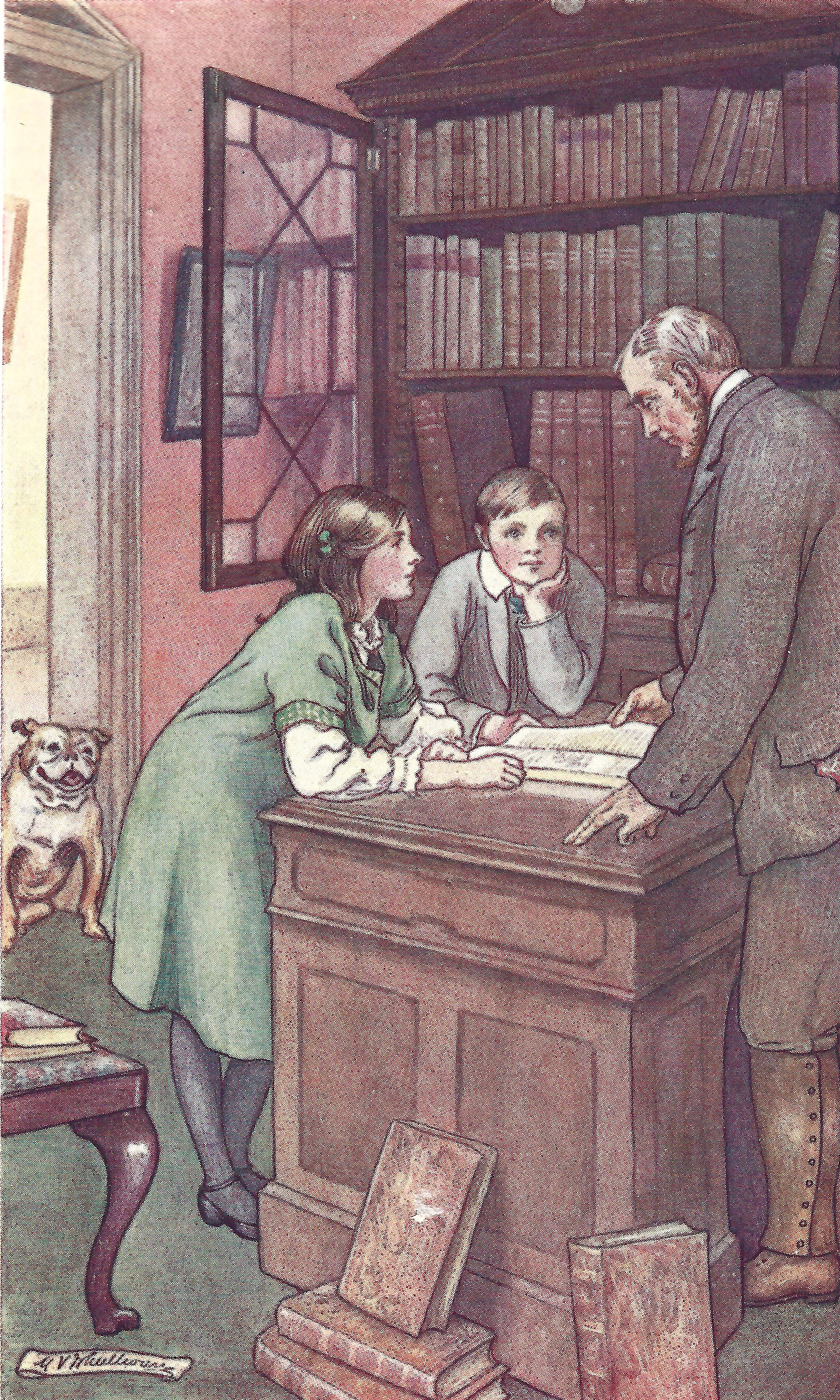
Frontispiece by Wheelhouse in Juliana Horatia Ewing's Mary's Meadow, London: G. Bell and Sons, 1915

Wheelhouse studied at the Scarborough School of Art, then spent three years studying in Paris at the Académie Delécluse. (Note: Sources say that Wheelhouse studied at "Academie Delecture" but there is no record of an Academie Delecture; it seems certain that "Delecture" is a misreading of "Delecluse", given the Delécluse's association with the WIAC of which Wheelhouse was a prominent member.) The Women's International Art Club (WIAC) was founded by students at the Académie Delécluse and Wheelhouse sat on the executive committee of the WIAC between 1904–06 and 1908–1914.

== Career ==
From 1900, Wheelhouse lived in Chelsea with the artist Louise Jacobs. They became toymakers, primarily making wooden dolls. Together they ran a shop, Pomona Toys in Cheyne Walk, in premises rented from artist Marion Dawson, who lived upstairs. They supplied children's toys to the department stores Fortnum's, Liberty's and Harrods and exhibited toys at the 1916 Arts and Crafts exhibition in London. Wheelhouse and Jacobs dissolved their toy making partnership in 1922, but Wheelhouse continued the company until just before the outbreak of World War II. She shared a house "Pomona Studios" in Fulham, with painter William Dickson, and artist couple Charles B. Praetorius and Minnie Cormack .

Wheelhouse also illustrated a large number of books and children's books, primarily by women writers including George Eliot, Juliana Horatia Ewing, George Sand and Elizabeth Gaskell. Her works were exhibited in group exhibitions, including at the Baillie Gallery in 1912.

== Suffrage ==
Wheelhouse campaigned for women's suffrage and was a board member of the Artists' Suffrage League (ASL), founded in 1907 to "further the cause of Women's Enfranchisement by the work and professional help of artists... by bringing in an attractive manner before the public eye the long continued demand for the vote" Wheelhouse created political cartoons for the ASL, such as "Those who ask shan’t have, those who don’t ask don’t want," which were published as postcards.

== Death and legacy ==
Wheelhouse died in 1947, aged 79.

In 2024, the first solo exhibition of Wheelhouse's work was held at the Heath Robinson Museum in Pinner, London.

== Works illustrated include ==
- May Baldwin's Holly House and Ridges Row, W. & R. Chambers, London, 1908
- Louisa M Alcott's "Good Wives", G. Bell & Sons, London, 1911
- Charlotte Brontë's "Jane Eyre", G. Bell & Sons, London, 1911
