= Charlotte Mary Yonge =

English novelist and churchwoman (1823–1901)

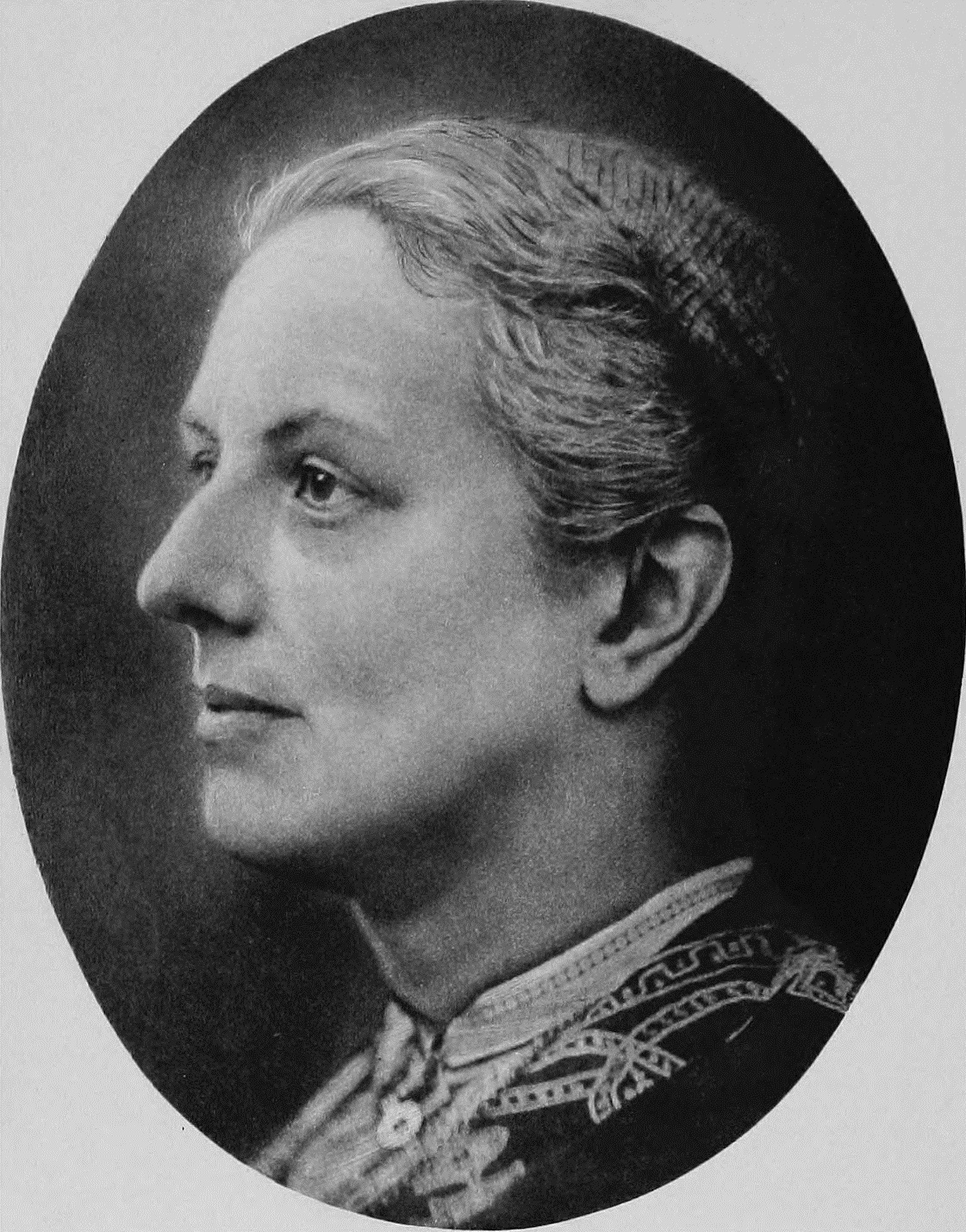
- Yonge, aged 35
- Born: 11 August 1823; Otterbourne, Hampshire, England
- Died: 24 March 1901 (aged 77); Otterbourne, Hampshire, England
- Resting place: St. Matthew's Church, Otterbourne, Hampshire
- Occupation: Novelist
- Relatives: William Yonge (father), Fanny Yonge, née Bargus (mother)
- Writing career
- Period: 19th century
- Genre: Children's literature

Charlotte Mary Yonge (11 August 1823 – 24 March 1901) was an English novelist, who wrote in the service of the church. Her abundant books helped to spread the influence of the Oxford Movement and showed her keen interest in matters of public health and sanitation.

== Life ==
Charlotte Mary Yonge was born in Otterbourne, Hampshire, England, on 11 August 1823 to William Yonge and Fanny Yonge, née Bargus. She was educated at home by her father, studying Latin, Greek, French, Euclid, and algebra. Her father's lessons could be harsh:

He required a diligence and accuracy that were utterly alien to me. He thundered at me so that nobody could bear to hear it, and often reduced me to tears, but his approbation was so delightful that it was a delicious stimulus.... I believe, in spite of all breezes over my innate slovenliness, it would have broken our hearts to leave off working together. And we went on till I was some years past twenty.

Yonge's devotion to her father was lifelong and her relations with him seem to have set the standard for all other relations, including marriage. His "approbation was throughout life my bliss; his anger my misery for the time."

Yonge was born into a religious family. Devoted to the High church, she was much influenced by John Keble, Vicar of Hursley from 1835, a near neighbour and one of the leaders of the Oxford Movement. Yonge was herself sometimes referred to as "the novelist of the Oxford Movement", as her work frequently reflects values and concerns of Anglo-Catholicism. She remained in Otterbourne all her life and taught for 71 years in the village Sunday school. Her house, 'Elderfield', became a Grade II listed building in 1984.

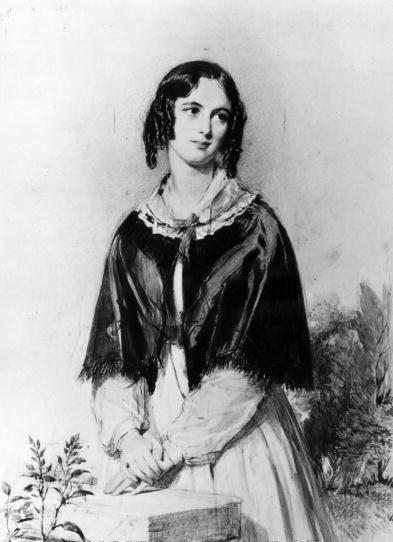
Yonge, c. 1845

In 1858 she paid for the construction of a combined school and chapel of ease to Hursley parish church in the village of Pitt. It was designed by William Butterfield and, like Elderfield, has been a Grade II listed building since 1984. In 1868 a new parish was formed to the south of Yonge's home village of Otterbourne. This was to contain the villages of Eastley and Barton. Yonge donated £500 towards the Church of the Resurrection, the Church of England parish church, and was asked to choose which of the two villages the parish should be named after. She chose Eastley but decided that it should be spelt Eastleigh as she perceived this as being more modern.

Yonge died in her home village of Otterbourne on 24 March 1901. Her obituary in The Times stated,

Her friends, and especially her poorer neighbours, knew both the strength and the winning charm of her character. Thus the late Archbishop Benson noted in his diary her "odd majesty and kindliness, which are very strong."

But it is of course as a writer that Miss Yonge will be remembered. She had an inventive mind and a ready pen, and a bare list of the books written or edited by her would probably occupy nearly a whole column of The Times. She wrote chiefly for young people, especially young girls, and her books are the result not only of a strong ethical purpose, but also of her firm devotion to the High Church view of Christian doctrine and practice.

== Literary career ==
Yonge began writing in 1848 and published in her long life about 160 works, chiefly novels. Her first commercial success, The Heir of Redclyffe (1853), provided the funding to put the schooner Southern Cross into service on behalf of George Selwyn. Similar charitable works were done with the profits from later novels. Yonge was also a founder and editor for 40 years of The Monthly Packet, a magazine founded in 1851, with a varied readership, but targeted at British Anglican girls, though in later years it turned to a somewhat wider readership.

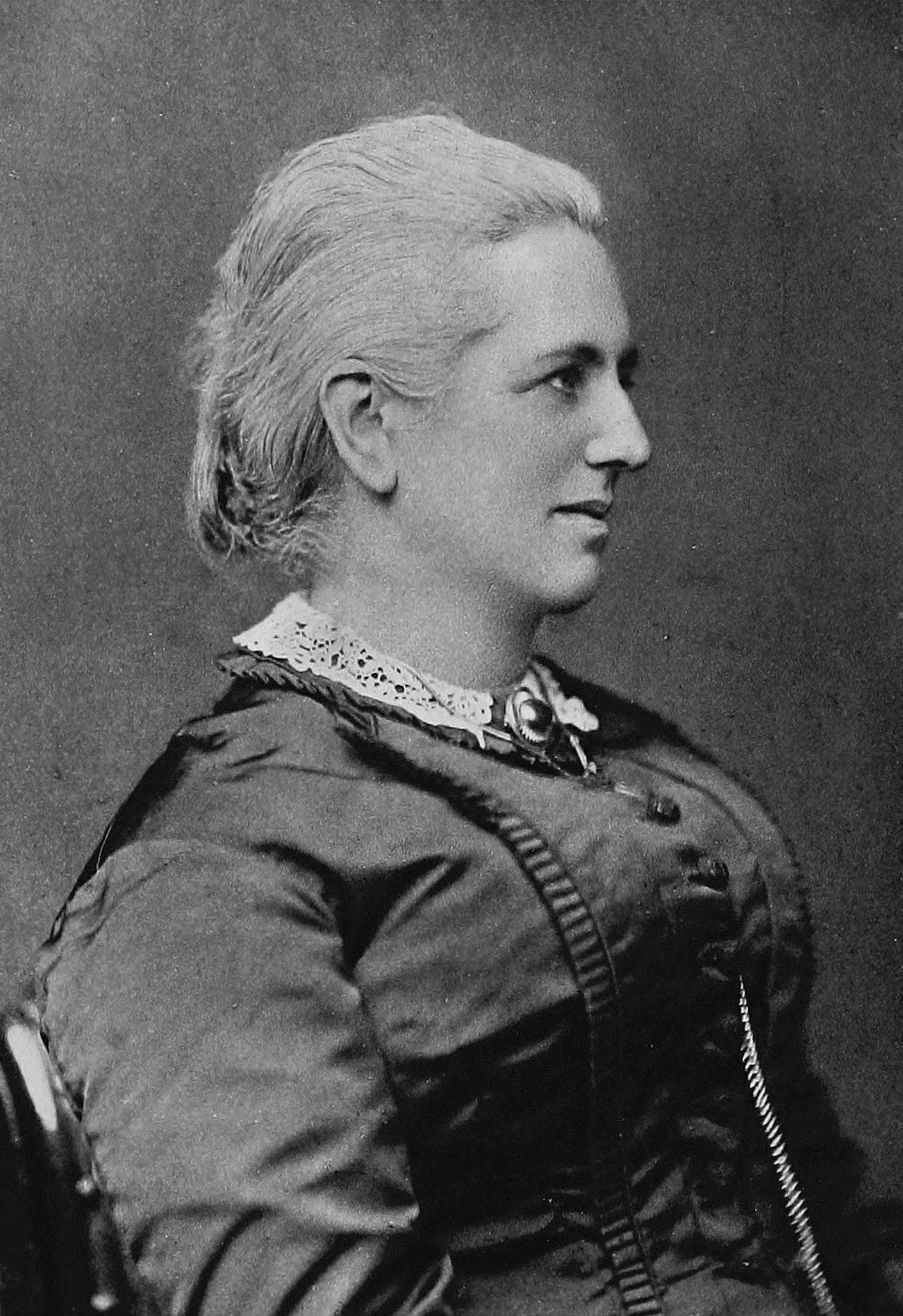
Charlotte Mary Yonge later in life

Among her other well-known works are Heartsease, and The Daisy Chain. A Book of Golden Deeds is a collection of true stories of courage and self-sacrifice. Other titles were Cameos from English History, Life of John Coleridge Patteson: Missionary Bishop of the Melanesian Islands, and Hannah More. Her History of Christian Names was described as "the first serious attempt at tackling the subject" and as the standard work on names in the preface to the first edition of Betty Withycombe's The Oxford Dictionary of English Christian Names (1944).

Around 1859 Yonge created a literary group of younger girl cousins, to write essays and gain advice from Yonge on their writing. Together they created a private magazine, The Barnacle, which continued until about 1871. This was valuable as they may have belonged to the last generation of girls educated at home. Her goddaughter, Alice Mary Coleridge, contributed as "Gurgoyle" to the first issue, drawing the covers and contributing translations, articles and verses.

Yonge's personal example and influence on her goddaughter Alice Mary Coleridge were formative in her zeal for women's education, leading indirectly to the foundation of Abbots Bromley School for Girls.

After Yonge's death, her friend, assistant and collaborator, Christabel Coleridge, published the biographical Charlotte Mary Yonge: her Life and Letters (1903).

== Reputation ==
Yonge's work was widely read and respected in the 19th century. Among her admirers were Lewis Carroll, George Eliot, William Ewart Gladstone, Charles Kingsley, Christina Rossetti, Alfred, Lord Tennyson, and Anthony Trollope. William Morris and Edward Burne-Jones read The Heir of Redclyffe aloud to each other while undergraduates at Oxford University and "took [the hero, Guy Morville's] medieval tastes and chivalric ideals as presiding elements in the formation of the Pre-Raphaelite Brotherhood." Yonge's work was compared favourably with that of Trollope, Jane Austen, Honoré de Balzac, Gustave Flaubert, and Émile Zola.

Sir John Arthur Ransome Marriott called her:

... not only a prolific novelist, but a serious student of history, especially in its personal aspects. Having dealt in The Constable's Tower with Hubert de Burgh, with his famous defence of Dover Castle against Prince Louis of France (1213), and his still more famous victory at sea off Sandwich, and with Edward I as a crusader (The Prince and the Page), Miss Yonge drew on the Vie de Bertrand du Guesclin as well as on Froissart for her fascinating tale The Lances of Lynwood. With characteristic modesty she expressed the hope that her sketch might "serve as an inducement to some young readers to make acquaintance with the delectable old Canon (Froissart) for themselves." The wise, of all ages, will fulfil her hope.

So popular were her works that

A midshipman was able to supply from memory a missing page in his ship's copy of The Daisy Chain. An officer in the Guards, asked in a game of "Confessions" what his prime object in life was, answered that it was to make himself like Guy Morville, hero of The Heir of Redclyffe.

C. S. Lewis thought highly of her, at one point bracketing her evocations of domestic life with those of Homer and Leo Tolstoy. Abraham Kuyper, who read The Heir of Redclyffe on the recommendation of his fiancé, Johanna Schaay, found it a moving experience. The novel was "next to the Bible in its meaning for my life." Yonge was one of the favourite writers of Barbara Pym, who mentions Yonge's novels favourably in several of her own novels.

However, according to the critic Catherine Sandbach-Dahlström, Yonge's work has been "constantly be-devilled" by a "tendency to confuse the moral quality of [her] view of life with the quality of her literary expression".

Her novels such as The Daisy Chain, The Young Stepmother, The Trial, and The Three Brides encompass Victorian problems of urban pollution, sanitary reform, and epidemics of cholera and typhoid. She urged social, economic and medical reform of dirt-ridden Victorian cities. The dualism found in her writings, writes Alethea Hayter, "serves to illustrate the triumphs and mistakes of reforming zeal, to contrast selfish irresponsibility with courageous philanthropy, to balance tradition against progress."

Yonge's work has been sparely studied, with the possible exception of The Heir of Redclyffe.

Graham Greene used epigraphs from The Little Duke for each chapter of his 1943 novel The Ministry of Fear. In Chapter 1, the protagonist Arthur Rowe buys a copy of the book at a fête for sixpence.

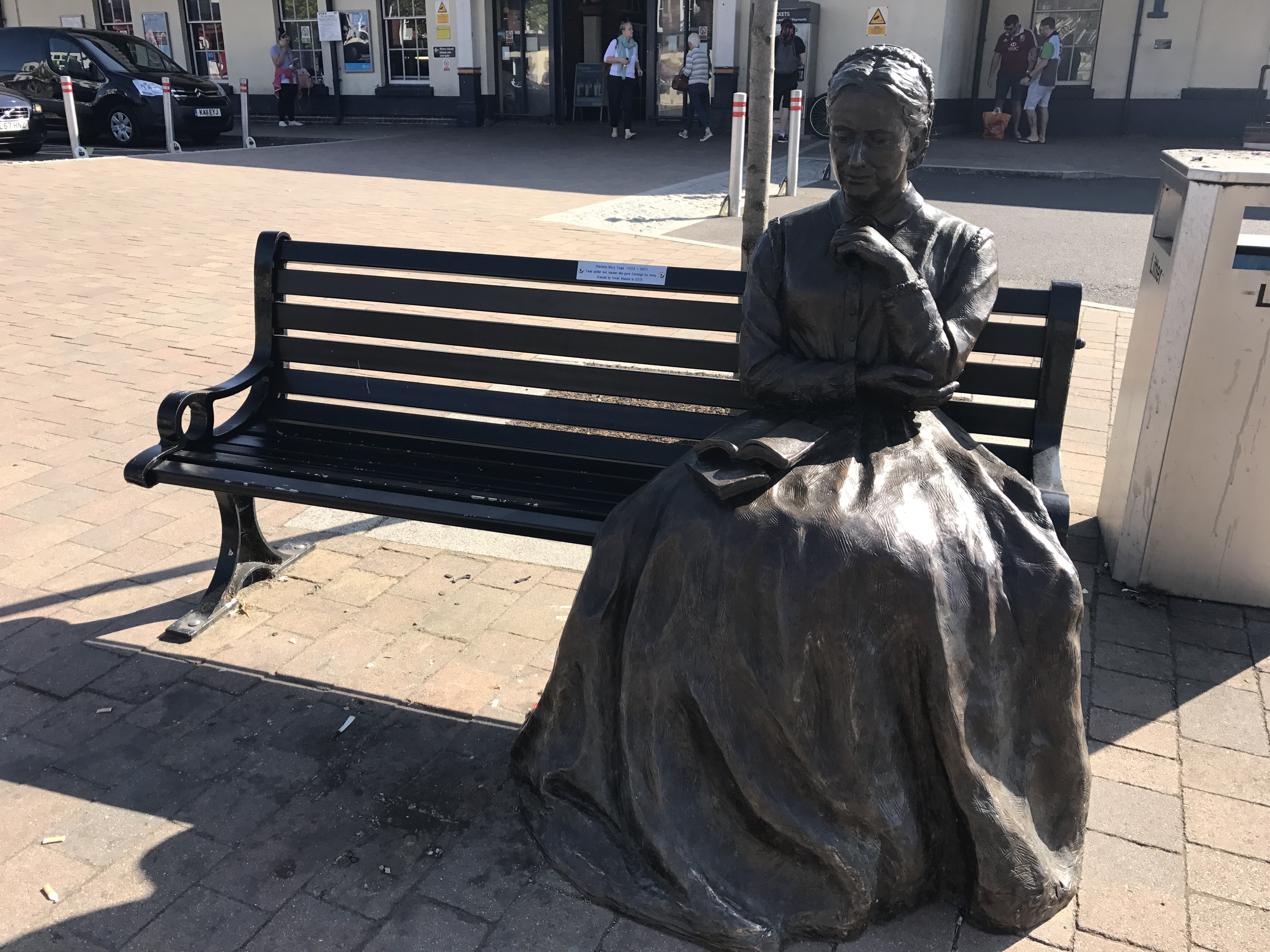
Sculpture of Yonge by Vivien Mallock outside Eastleigh railway station

In 2015 a sculpture by Vivien Mallock was installed outside Eastleigh railway station, as a tribute to Yonge for having effectively named the town. It shows her at the age of about 45 when she named Eastleigh parish. It shows her sitting on a bench with a book on her lap, with space for members of the public to sit alongside her.

== Selected works ==
- Abbeychurch, or Self Control and Self Conceit (1844)
- Kings of England: A History for Young Children (1848)
- The Heir of Redclyffe (1853)
- Heartsease, or The Brother's Wife (1854)
- The Little Duke: Richard the Fearless (1854)
- The Daisy Chain, or Aspirations (1856)
- Hopes and Fears, or Scenes from the Life of a Spinster (1860)
- The Young Step-Mother, or A Chronicle of Mistakes (1861)
- The Trial, or More Links of the Daisy Chain (1864)
- The Clever Woman of the Family (1865)
- The Prince and the Page: A Story of the Last Crusade (1866)
- The Dove in the Eagle's Nest (1866)
- The Chaplet of Pearls, or The White and Black Ribaumont (1868)
- The Pillars of the House, or Under Wode, Under Rode (1873)
- The Three Brides (1876)
- Young Folks' History of Rome (1878)
- Young Folks' History of England (1879)
- Young Folks' History of France (1879)
- The Armourer's Prentices (1884)
- Modern Broods (1900)
