= List of awards and nominations received by Angela Lansbury =

Angela Lansbury awards and nominations
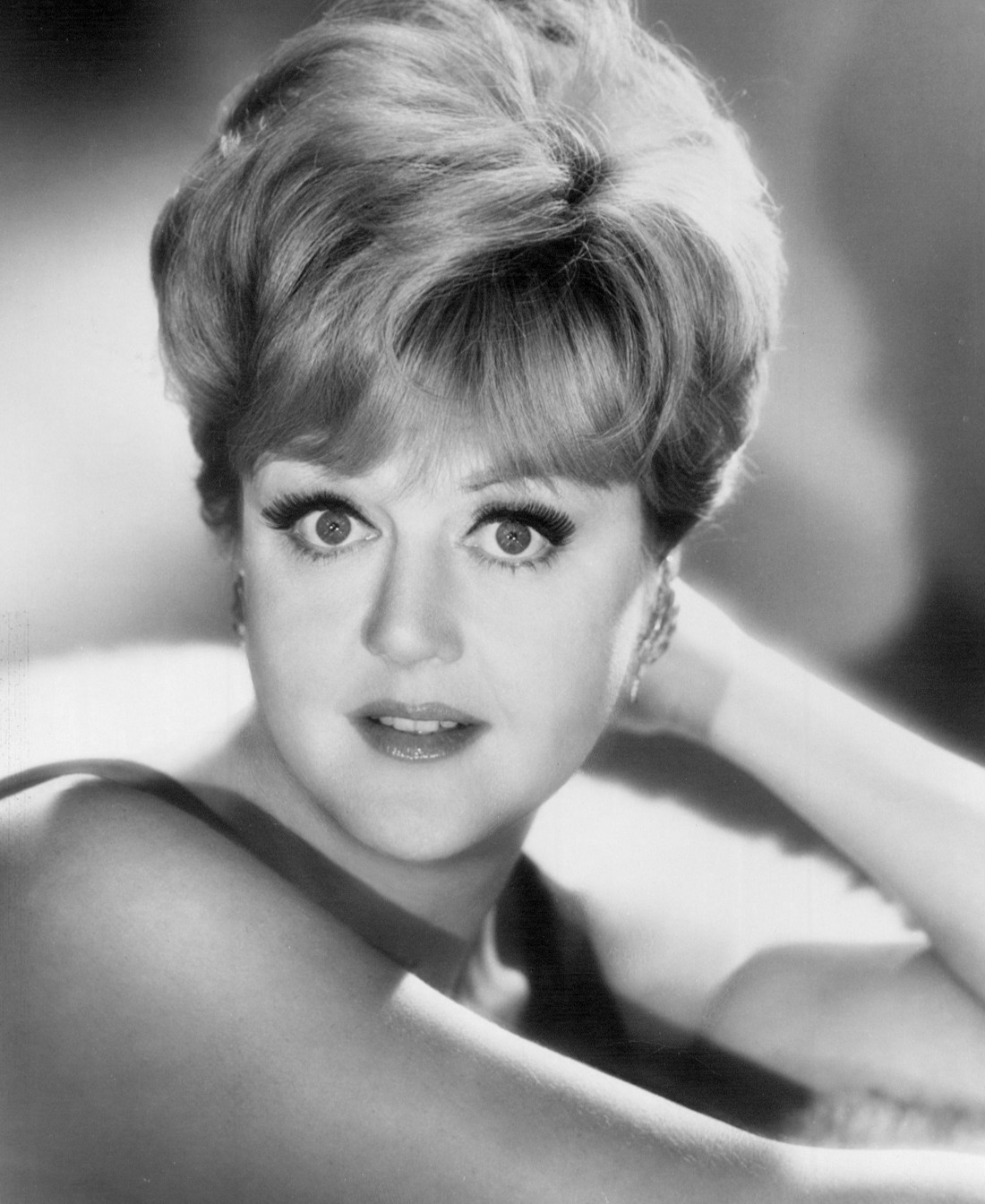
- Lansbury in 1966
Awards and nominations
Award	Wins	Nominations
Academy Awards	0	3
BAFTA Awards	0	1
Golden Globe Awards	6	15
Grammy Awards	0	1
Primetime Emmy Awards	0	18
Screen Actors Guild Awards	0	1
Tony Awards	5	7

Totals (Note: Certain award groups do not simply award one winner. They acknowledge several different recipients, have runners-up, and have third place. Since this is a specific recognition and is different from losing an award, runner-up mentions are considered wins in this award tally. For simplification and to avoid errors, each award in this list has been presumed to have had a prior nomination.)
- Wins: 49
- Nominations: 256

Dame Angela Lansbury was a British-American actress known for her extensive work on stage and screen. Lansbury received numerous accolades including an Academy Honorary Award, six Golden Globe Awards, a Laurence Olivier Award, and five Tony Awards as well as nominations for a BAFTA Award, 18 Primetime Emmy Awards, a Grammy Award, and a Screen Actors Guild Award. She is one of few performers who have received nominations for all EGOT awards — Emmy, Grammy, Academy Award (Oscar), and Tony Awards.

Lansbury started her career in film earning three Academy Award nominations for Best Supporting Actress for her performances as a maid in Gaslight (1944), a tavern singer in The Picture of Dorian Gray (1945), and a sinister mother in The Manchurian Candidate (1962). She received an Honorary Academy Award for her lifetime achievement in film in 2013. She also earned two Golden Globe Awards for The Picture of Dorian Gray, and The Manchurian Candidate. She earned a Grammy Award nomination for Album of the Year for Beauty and the Beast (1991).

Lansbury, an icon in musical theatre, won five competitive Tony Award: four for Best Actress in a Musical (current record for this category) for playing the title role in Mame (1966), Countess Aurelia in Dear World (1969), Mama Rose in Gypsy (1975), and Mrs. Lovett in Sweeney Todd: The Demon Barber of Fleet Street (1979), and one for Best Featured Actress in a Play for playing Madame Arcati in Blithe Spirit (2009). She was Tony-nominated for her roles in Deuce (2007), and A Little Night Music (2010). She also earned a Laurence Olivier Award, three Drama Desk Awards, and two Outer Critics Circle Awards.

For her work in television she earned 18 Primetime Emmy Award nominations including a record 12 consecutive nominations for Outstanding Actress in a Drama Series for her role as Jessica Fletcher in the CBS murder-mystery series Murder, She Wrote (1984–1996). The role earned her 10 Golden Globe Award for Best Actress – Television Series Drama nominations with four wins and a nomination for the Screen Actors Guild Award for Outstanding Lead Actress in a Drama Series. She was Emmy-nominated for hosting the 41st Tony Awards, and the 43rd Tony Awards.

Lansbury has many awards records including tying with Julie Harris with the most Tony Awards from a performer with five. She was surpassed only by Audra McDonald with six wins. Only five performers have been nominated for all four Tony acting awards, Lansbury, McDonald, Raúl Esparza, Jan Maxwell, and Boyd Gaines. At the Golden Globes, Lansbury tied with Alan Alda, Shirley MacLaine, and Jack Nicholson as the second-most awarded performer in acting categories, and surpassed only by Meryl Streep with eight wins.

Lansbury was appointed a Dame Commander of the Order of the British Empire (DBE) by Queen Elizabeth II in 2014 for her services to drama. Over her career she has received several honorary awards such as the Screen Actors Guild Life Achievement Award in 1997, the National Medal of Arts in 1997, the Kennedy Center Honors in 2000, the Britannia Award for Lifetime Achievement in 2003, and a Special Tony Award in 2022. Lansbury has two stars on the Hollywood Walk of Fame and was inducted into the American Theatre Hall of Fame in 1982 and the Television Hall of Fame in 1996.

== Major associations ==
=== Academy Awards ===
Year	Category	Nominated work	Result	Ref.
1944	Best Supporting Actress	Gaslight	Nominated	
1945	Best Supporting Actress	The Picture of Dorian Gray	Nominated	
1962	Best Supporting Actress	The Manchurian Candidate	Nominated	
2013	Academy Honorary Award	—N/a	Honored	

=== BAFTA Awards ===
Year	Category	Nominated work	Result	Ref.
British Academy Film Awards
1978	Best Actress in a Supporting Role	Death on the Nile	Nominated	
1991	Special Award	—N/a	Honored	
Britannia Award
2003	Lifetime Achievement in Television and Film	—N/a	Honored	

=== Emmy Awards ===
Year	Category	Nominated work	Result	Ref.
Primetime Emmy Awards
1983	Outstanding Lead Actress in a Limited Series or a Special	Little Gloria... Happy at Last	Nominated	
1985	Outstanding Individual Performance in a Variety Program	Sweeney Todd: The Demon Barber of Fleet Street	Nominated	
1985	Outstanding Lead Actress in a Drama Series	Murder, She Wrote (season one)	Nominated	
1986	Outstanding Lead Actress in a Drama Series	Murder, She Wrote (season two)	Nominated	
1987	Outstanding Lead Actress in a Drama Series	Murder, She Wrote (season three)	Nominated	
1987	Outstanding Individual Performance in a Variety Program	41st Tony Awards	Nominated	
1988	Outstanding Lead Actress in a Drama Series	Murder, She Wrote (season four)	Nominated	
1989	Outstanding Lead Actress in a Drama Series	Murder, She Wrote (season five)	Nominated	
1990	Outstanding Lead Actress in a Drama Series	Murder, She Wrote (season six)	Nominated	
1990	Outstanding Individual Performance in a Variety Program	43rd Tony Awards	Nominated	
1991	Outstanding Lead Actress in a Drama Series	Murder, She Wrote (episode: "Thursday's Child")	Nominated	
1992	Outstanding Lead Actress in a Drama Series	Murder, She Wrote (episode: "Night Fears")	Nominated	
1993	Outstanding Lead Actress in a Drama Series	Murder, She Wrote (episode: "Night of the Coyote")	Nominated	
1994	Outstanding Lead Actress in a Drama Series	Murder, She Wrote (episode: "A Killing in Cork")	Nominated	
1995	Outstanding Lead Actress in a Drama Series	Murder, She Wrote (episode: "Dear Deadly")	Nominated	
1996	Outstanding Lead Actress in a Drama Series	Murder, She Wrote (episode: "Death by Demographics")	Nominated	
2004	Outstanding Supporting Actress in a Miniseries or a Movie	The Blackwater Lightship	Nominated	
2005	Outstanding Guest Actress in a Drama Series	Law & Order (episodes: "Night" + "Day")	Nominated	

=== Golden Globe Awards ===
Year	Category	Nominated work	Result	Ref.
1945	Best Supporting Actress – Motion Picture	The Picture of Dorian Gray	Won	
1962	Best Supporting Actress – Motion Picture	The Manchurian Candidate	Won	
1970	Best Actress – Motion Picture Comedy or Musical	Something for Everyone	Nominated	
1971	Best Actress – Motion Picture Comedy or Musical	Bedknobs and Broomsticks	Nominated	
1983	Best Supporting Actress – Series, Miniseries or TV Film	The Gift of Love: A Christmas Story	Nominated	
1984	Best Actress – Television Series Drama	Murder, She Wrote	Won	
1985	Best Actress – Television Series Drama	Murder, She Wrote	Nominated	
1986	Best Actress – Television Series Drama	Murder, She Wrote	Won	
1987	Best Actress – Television Series Drama	Murder, She Wrote	Nominated	
1988	Best Actress – Television Series Drama	Murder, She Wrote	Nominated	
1989	Best Actress – Television Series Drama	Murder, She Wrote	Won	
1990	Best Actress – Television Series Drama	Murder, She Wrote	Nominated	
1991	Best Actress – Television Series Drama	Murder, She Wrote	Won	
1992	Best Actress – Television Series Drama	Murder, She Wrote	Nominated	
1994	Best Actress – Television Series Drama	Murder, She Wrote	Nominated	

=== Grammy Awards ===
Year	Category	Nominated work	Result	Ref.
1993	Album of the Year	Beauty and the Beast	Nominated	

=== Screen Actors Guild Awards ===
Year	Category	Nominated work	Result	Ref.
1994	Outstanding Actress in a Drama Series	Murder, She Wrote	Nominated	
1996	Life Achievement Award	—N/a	Honored	

=== Laurence Olivier Awards ===
Year	Category	Nominated work	Result	Ref.
2015	Best Actress in a Supporting Role	Blithe Spirit	Won	

=== Tony Awards ===
Year	Category	Nominated work	Result	Ref.
1966	Best Actress in a Musical	Mame	Won	
1969	Best Actress in a Musical	Dear World	Won	
1975	Best Actress in a Musical	Gypsy	Won	
1979	Best Actress in a Musical	Sweeney Todd: The Demon Barber of Fleet Street	Won	
2007	Best Actress in a Play	Deuce	Nominated	
2009	Best Featured Actress in a Play	Blithe Spirit	Won	
2010	Best Featured Actress in a Musical	A Little Night Music	Nominated	
2022	Lifetime Achievement Tony Award	—N/a	Honored	

== Theater awards ==
Organizations	Year	Category	Work	Result	Ref.
Drama Desk Awards	1975	Outstanding Actress in a Musical	Gypsy	Won	
Drama Desk Awards	1978	Outstanding Actress in a Musical	The King and I	Nominated	
Drama Desk Awards	1979	Outstanding Actress in a Musical	Sweeney Todd: The Demon Barber of Fleet Street	Won	
Drama Desk Awards	2009	Outstanding Featured Actress in a Play	Blithe Spirit	Won	
Drama Desk Awards	2010	Outstanding Featured Actress in a Musical	A Little Night Music	Nominated	
Drama Desk Awards	2012	Outstanding Featured Actress in a Play	The Best Man	Nominated	
Outer Critics Circle Awards	1966	Outstanding Performance	Mame	Won	
Outer Critics Circle Awards	2009	Outstanding Featured Actress in a Play	Blithe Spirit	Won	
Outer Critics Circle Awards	2010	Outstanding Featured Actress in a Musical	A Little Night Music	Nominated	
Outer Critics Circle Awards	2012	Outstanding Featured Actress in a Play	The Best Man	Nominated	

== Miscellaneous awards ==
Organizations	Year	Category	Work	Result	Ref.
Annie Award	1997	Outstanding Female in an Animated Feature	Anastasia	Nominated	
CableAce Award	1986	Actress in a Theatrical or Musical Production	Sweeney Todd: The Demon Barber of Fleet Street	Won	
Laurel Award	1963	Best Supporting Performance	The Manchurian Candidate	4th Place	
National Board of Review	1962	Best Supporting Actress	The Manchurian Candidate / All Fall Down	Won	
National Board of Review	1978	Best Supporting Actress	Death on the Nile	Won	
Palm Springs International Film Festival	2018	Best Ensemble	Mary Poppins Returns	Won	
Satellite Award	2005	Best Actress in a Miniseries ot Television Film	The Blackwater Lightship	Nominated	
Saturn Awards	1982	Best Actress	The Mirror Crack'd	Nominated	

== Honorary awards ==
Organizations	Year	Notes	Result	Ref.
Hollywood Walk of Fame	1960	Two stars; one for film and one for television	Honored	
Harvard University	1968	Hasty Pudding Woman of the Year	Honored	
American Theatre Wing	1982	American Theatre Hall of Fame Inductee	Honored	
UCLA Spring Sing	1988	George and Ira Gershwin Award	Honored	
Monarchy of the United Kingdom	1994	Queen Elizabeth II appointed her Commander (CBE) for "her services to drama"	Honored	
Walt Disney Company	1995	Disney Legend Award	Honored	
Women in Film Los Angeles	1996	Women in Film Lucy Award	Honored	
Screen Actors Guild	1996	Screen Actors Guild Life Achievement Award	Honored	
Academy of Television Arts & Sciences	1996	Television Hall of Fame Inductee	Honored	
Television Critics Association	1996	Career Achievement Award	Honored	
United States of America	1997	National Medal of Arts	Honored	
John F. Kennedy Center for the Performing Arts	2000	Kennedy Center Honors	Honored	
The New Dramatists Society	2000	Lifetime Achievement Award	Honored	
The Acting Company	2002	First Lifetime Achievement Award	Honored	
Britannia Award	2003	Lifetime Achievement Award	Honored	
The Actors Fund of America	2004	Lifetime Achievement Award	Honored	
University of Miami	2008	Doctor of Humane Letters "honoris causa" degree	Honored	
New York Drama Critics' Circle	2009	Special Citation (for her contribution to the American theater)	Honored	
Drama League Award	2009	The Unique Contribution to the Theatre Award	Honored	
Drama League Award	2010	Drama League Honors	Honored	
Signature Theatre	2010	Sondheim Award	Honored	
American Theatre Wing	2010	Named Honorary Chairman	Honored	
Dorian Awards	2011	Timeless Star Award	Honored	
Monarchy of the United Kingdom	2014	Queen Elizabeth II appointed her Dame (DBE) for "her services to charity"	Honored	
Special Tony Award	2022	Lifetime Achievement Award	Honored	

== See also ==
- Angela Lansbury on screen and stage
- Academy Honorary Awards
- Golden Globe Award Superlatives
