= Angela Lansbury on screen and stage =

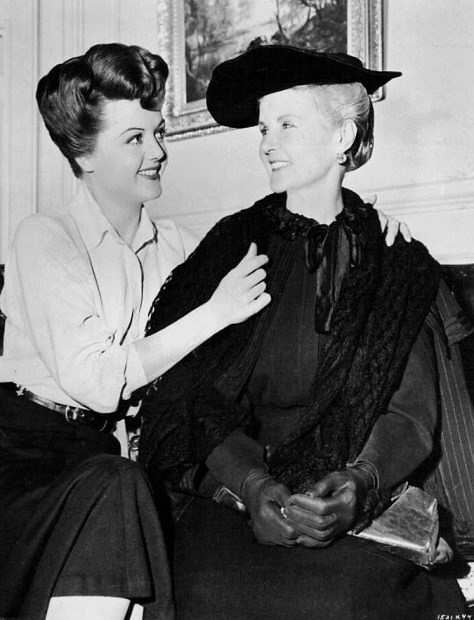
Lansbury (left) with her mother, Moyna Macgill, on the set of Kind Lady (1951).

British and American actress Angela Lansbury was known for her prolific work in theatre, film, and television.

Lansbury's career spanned eight decades. She made her film debut in Gaslight (1944), and followed it up with an appearance in The Picture of Dorian Gray (1945). She earned two consecutive Academy Award nominations for Best Supporting Actress, and won the Supporting Actress Golden Globe for the latter film. Subsequent films throughout the late 1940s and the 1950s included National Velvet (1944), The Harvey Girls (1946), State of the Union (1948), Kind Lady (1951), The Court Jester (1956), and The Long, Hot Summer (1958).

She drifted towards more complex, mature work with The Dark at the Top of the Stairs (1960), All Fall Down (1962), In the Cool of the Day (1963), Dear Heart (1964); and, in one of her most infamous roles, as the Machiavellian Mrs. Iselin in The Manchurian Candidate (1962). For the latter, she received stellar reviews, winning a second Golden Globe and earning her third Oscar nomination.

Meanwhile, Lansbury also found success on stage. She starred on Broadway in A Taste of Honey, Stephen Sondheim's Anyone Can Whistle, and later on as Anna Leonowens in The King and I. But that time with Sondheim began a collaborative partnership that would garner them both frequent success. Together, they also worked on Mame, the Broadway revival of Gypsy, and Sweeney Todd: The Demon Barber of Fleet Street. And for those three successful hits (plus one considered a flop, for which she was nonetheless praised, Dear World; albeit not by Sondheim), Lansbury won the Tony Award for Best Actress in a Musical an unprecedented, and undefeated, four times.

Intermittently, she returned to do films, appearing in the dark comedy, Something for Everyone (1970). The following year, she starred in Disney's Bedknobs and Broomsticks (1971). She earned Best Comedy/Musical Actress Golden Globe nominations for both roles. For the Hercule Poirot yarn, Death on the Nile (1978), she won the National Board of Review Award for Best Supporting Actress and earned a BAFTA nomination as well. She portrayed Miss Marple two years later in another Agatha Christie tale, The Mirror Crack'd (1980), earning a Saturn Award nom.

In the 1980s, she began to direct her efforts towards television. She earned her first Primetime Emmy nomination alongside Bette Davis, both for the miniseries Little Gloria...Happy at Last (1982). However, it would be her iconic role as mystery author Jessica Fletcher on Murder, She Wrote (1984–1996) which would immortalize her with a whole new generation. She starred in every episode for twelve seasons, and received an Emmy nomination for each of them, although she never won. She did win four more Golden Globe Awards, however, for Best Actress in a TV Drama Series, bringing her grand total to six. In total, she received eighteen unsuccessful Emmy bids, rendering her the most nominated individual performer never to win that award.

Lansbury lent her talents as a voice actress to Disney's Beauty and the Beast (1991) as Mrs. Potts, who sang the titular song in the film, as well as Anastasia (1997). She acted sporadically throughout various films, TV shows, and stage productions throughout the next two and a half decades, including playing the wicked Great Aunt Adelaide in Emma Thompson's Nanny McPhee (2005). She made a return to the stage opposite Marian Seldes in Deuce, and received her fifth nomination. She earned a sixth nomination for Blithe Spirit and won her fifth Tony as a result. Lansbury earned a seventh and final nomination for A Little Night Music, at the following year's ceremony. For her distinguished career, she has been presented with several honorary tributes, including the Honorary Academy Award and a Special Tony Award, plus damehood from Queen Elizabeth II. Lansbury's final role was a cameo as herself in Glass Onion: A Knives Out Mystery (2022), which was released posthumously, shortly after her death.

== Film ==
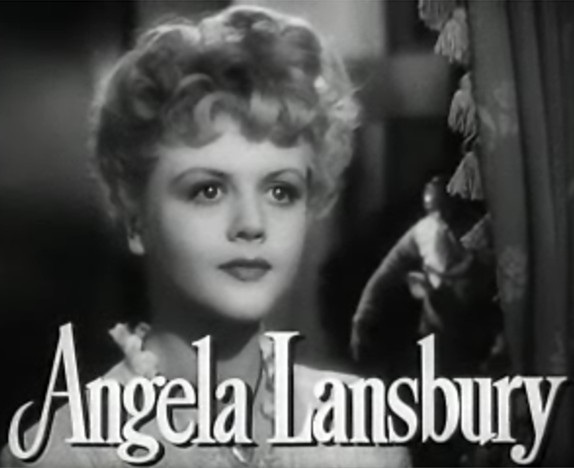
Still from the trailer for The Picture of Dorian Gray (1945)

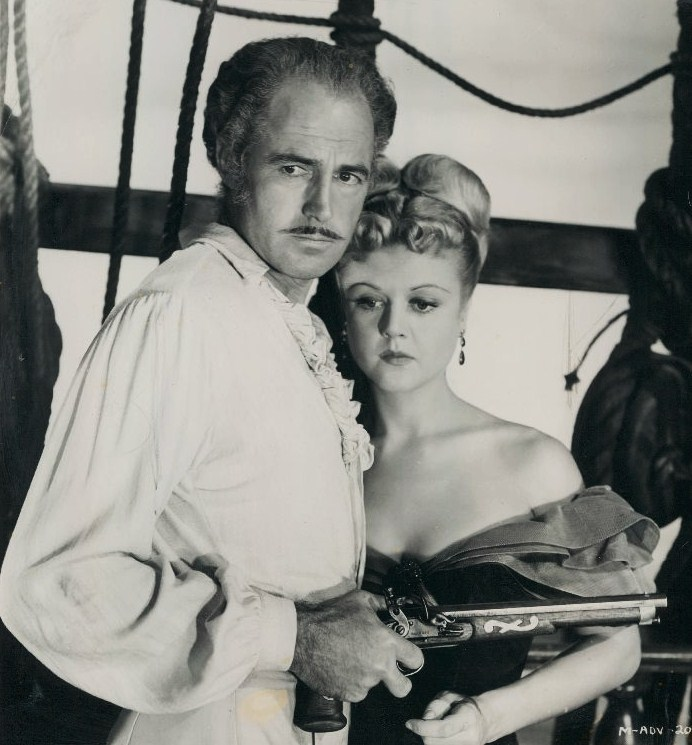
With Patric Knowles in a still from the trailer for Mutiny (1952)

List of film credits
Year	Title	Role(s)	Notes	Ref(s)
1944	Gaslight	Nancy Oliver		
1944	National Velvet	Edwina Brown		
1945	The Picture of Dorian Gray	Sibyl Vane		
1946	The Harvey Girls	Em		
1946	The Hoodlum Saint	"Dusty" Millard		
1946	Till the Clouds Roll By	Star of London Gaieties		
1947	The Private Affairs of Bel Ami	Clotilde de Marelle		
1947	If Winter Comes	Mabel Sabre		
1948	Tenth Avenue Angel	Susan Bratten		
1948	State of the Union	Kay Thorndyke		
1948	The Three Musketeers	Queen Anne		
1949	The Red Danube	Audrey Quail		
1949	Samson and Delilah	Semadar		
1951	Kind Lady	Mrs. Edwards		
1952	Mutiny	Leslie Waldridge		
1953	Remains to Be Seen	Valeska Chauvel		
1955	The Purple Mask	Madame Valentine		
1955	A Life at Stake	Doris Hillman		
1955	A Lawless Street	Tally Dickinsen		
1955	The Court Jester	Princess Gwendolyn		
1956	Please Murder Me!	Myra Leeds		
1958	The Long, Hot Summer	Minnie Littlejohn		
1958	The Reluctant Debutante	Mabel Claremont		
1959	Summer of the Seventeenth Doll	Pearl		
1960	A Breath of Scandal	Countess Lina Schwatzenfeld		
1960	The Dark at the Top of the Stairs	Mavis Pruitt		
1961	Blue Hawaii	Sarah Lee Gates		
1962	The Four Horsemen of the Apocalypse	Marguerite Laurier (voice)	Provided dubbing for Ingrid Thulin	
1962	All Fall Down	Annabell Willart		
1962	The Manchurian Candidate	Eleanor Shaw Iselin		
1963	In the Cool of the Day	Sybil Logan		
1964	The World of Henry Orient	Isabel Boyd		
1964	Dear Heart	Phyllis		
1965	The Greatest Story Ever Told	Claudia		
1965	The Amorous Adventures of Moll Flanders	Lady Blystone		
1965	Harlow	Mama Jean Bello		
1966	Mister Buddwing	Gloria		
1970	Something for Everyone	Countess Herthe von Ornstein		
1971	Bedknobs and Broomsticks	Miss Eglantine Price		
1978	Death on the Nile	Salome Otterbourne		
1979	The Lady Vanishes	Miss Froy		
1980	The Mirror Crack'd	Miss Marple		
1982	The Last Unicorn	Mommy Fortuna (voice)		
1983	The Pirates of Penzance	Ruth		
1984	The Company of Wolves	Granny		
1991	Beauty and the Beast	Mrs. Potts (voice)		
1997	Beauty and the Beast: The Enchanted Christmas	Mrs. Potts (voice)	Direct-to-video	
1997	Anastasia	Dowager Empress Maria Feodorovna (voice)		
2000	Fantasia 2000	Herself	Segment "Firebird Suite - 1919 Version"	
2003	Broadway: The Golden Age	Herself	Documentary	
2005	Nanny McPhee	Great Aunt Adelaide		
2008	Heidi 4 Paws	Grandmamma (voice)		
2011	Mr. Popper's Penguins	Selma Van Gundy		
2014	Driving Miss Daisy	Miss Daisy Werthan	Theatrical release of stage production	
2018	The Grinch	Mayor McGerkle (voice)		
2018	Mary Poppins Returns	Balloon Lady		
2018	Buttons: A Christmas Tale	Rose		
2022	Glass Onion	Herself (cameo)	Posthumous release; final film role	

== Television ==
With Patricia Cutts and Ann Todd in the teleplay The Grey Nurse Said Nothing (1959)

List of television credits
Year(s)	Title	Role(s)	Notes	Ref(s)
1950 1953	Robert Montgomery Presents	Christine Manson; Rosie	Episode: "The Citadel"; Episode: "Cakes and Ale"	
1950 1952 1952 1954	Lux Video Theatre	Leslie; Lucy Landor; Tina Rafferty; Elsa	Episode: "That Wonderful Night"; Episode: "Operation Weekend"; Episode: "Stone's Throw"; Episode: "A Chair for a Lady"	
1953	The Revlon Mirror Theater	Joan Dexter	Episode: "Dreams Never Lie"	
1953	Ford Television Theatre	Lola Walker	Episode: "The Ming Lama"	
1953	Pantomime Quiz	Guest		
1953	Schlitz Playhouse of Stars	Florie Vandrop	Episode: "Storm Swept"	
1954	Your Show of Shows	Guest Host		
1954	General Electric True Theater	Daphne Rutledge	Episode: "The Crime of Daphne Rutledge"	
1954–1955	Four Star Playhouse	Joan Robinson; Mrs. Hallerton	Episode: "A String of Beads"; Episode: "Madeira, Madeira"	
1954	The George Gobel Show	Guest		
1955	Fireside Theatre	Mrs. Jarvis	Episode: "The Indiscreet Mrs. Jarvis"	
1955	Stage 7	Vanessa Peters	Episode: "Billy and the Bride"	
1955–1956	The Star and the Story	Mrs. Jane Pritchard	Episode: "The Treasure"; Episode: "The Force of Circumstance"	
1955–1956	Celebrity Playhouse	Unknown; Deborah	Episode: "Empty Arms"; Episode: "Deborah"	
1956	Chevron Hall of Stars	Laura Ellsworth	Episode: "Crisis in Kansas"	
1956	Front Row Center	Joyce	Episode: "Instant of Truth"	
1956	Screen Directors Playhouse	Vera Wayne	Episode: "Claire"	
1956	Studio 57	Katy; Flossie Norris	Episode: "The Rarest Stamp"; Episode: "The Brown Leather Case"	
1956–1957	Climax!	Justina Marshall; Judith Beresford	Episode: "Bury Me Later"; Episode: "The Devil's Brood"	
1958–1959	Playhouse 90	Victoria Atkins; Hazel Wills	Episode: "Verdict of Three"; Episode: "The Grey Nurse Said Nothing"	
1963	The Eleventh Hour	Alvera Dunlear	Episode: "Something Crazy's Going on in the Back Room"	
1965	The Man from U.N.C.L.E.	Elfie van Donck	Episode: "The Deadly Toys Affair"	
1965	The Trials of O'Brien	Celeste Thurlow	Episode: "Leave It to Me"	
1975	The First Christmas: The Story of the First Christmas Snow	Sister Theresa / Narrator (voice)	Television special	
1982	Sweeney Todd: The Demon Barber of Fleet Street	Nellie Lovett	Television special (filmed stage performance)	
1982	Little Gloria... Happy at Last	Gertrude Vanderbilt Whitney	Miniseries	
1983	The Gift of Love: A Christmas Story	Amanda Fenwick	Television film	
1983	A Talent for Murder	Ann Royce McClain	Television film	
1984	Lace	Aunt Hortense Boutin	Miniseries	
1984	The First Olympics: Athens 1896	Alice Garrett	Miniseries	
1984–1996	Murder, She Wrote	Jessica Fletcher	264 episodes	
1986	Magnum, P.I.	Jessica Fletcher	Episode: "Novel Connection"	
1986	Rage of Angels: The Story Continues	Marchesa Allabrandi	Television film	
1988	Shootdown	Nan Moore	Television film	
1989	The Shell Seekers	Penelope Keeling	Television film	
1990	The Love She Sought	Agatha McGee	Television film	
1992	Mrs. 'Arris Goes to Paris	Mrs. Ada Harris	Television film	
1996	Mrs. Santa Claus	Mrs. Santa Claus	Television film	
1997	Murder, She Wrote: South by Southwest	Jessica Fletcher	Television film	
1999	The Unexpected Mrs. Pollifax	Emily Pollifax	Television film	
2000	Murder, She Wrote: A Story to Die For	Jessica Fletcher	Television film	
2001	Murder, She Wrote: The Last Free Man	Jessica Fletcher	Television film	
2002	Touched by an Angel	Penelope Berrington	Episode: "For All the Tea in China"	
2003	Murder, She Wrote: The Celtic Riddle	Fletcher	Television film	
2004	The Blackwater Lightship	Dora	Television film	
2005	Law & Order: Special Victims Unit	Eleanor Duvall	Episode: "Night"	
2005	Law & Order: Trial by Jury	Eleanor Duvall	Episode: "Day"	
2014	Great Performances: Driving Miss Daisy	Miss Daisy Werthan	Filmed stage performance	
2017	Little Women	Aunt March	Miniseries	

== Radio ==
Year(s)	Title	Role	Notes	Ref(s)
1947	Suspense	Unknown	Episode: "A Thing of Beauty"	
1948–1949	NBC University Theatre	Mildred; Elizabeth Bennet	Episode: "Of Human Bondage"; Episode: "Pride and Prejudice"	
1950	The MGM Theater of the Air	Unknown	Episode: "Stamboul Quest"	
1952	Theatre Guild on the Air	Unknown	Episode: "Dear Brutus"	
1952	Stars over Hollywood	Unknown	Episode: "The Lady and the Beachcomber"	

== Stage ==
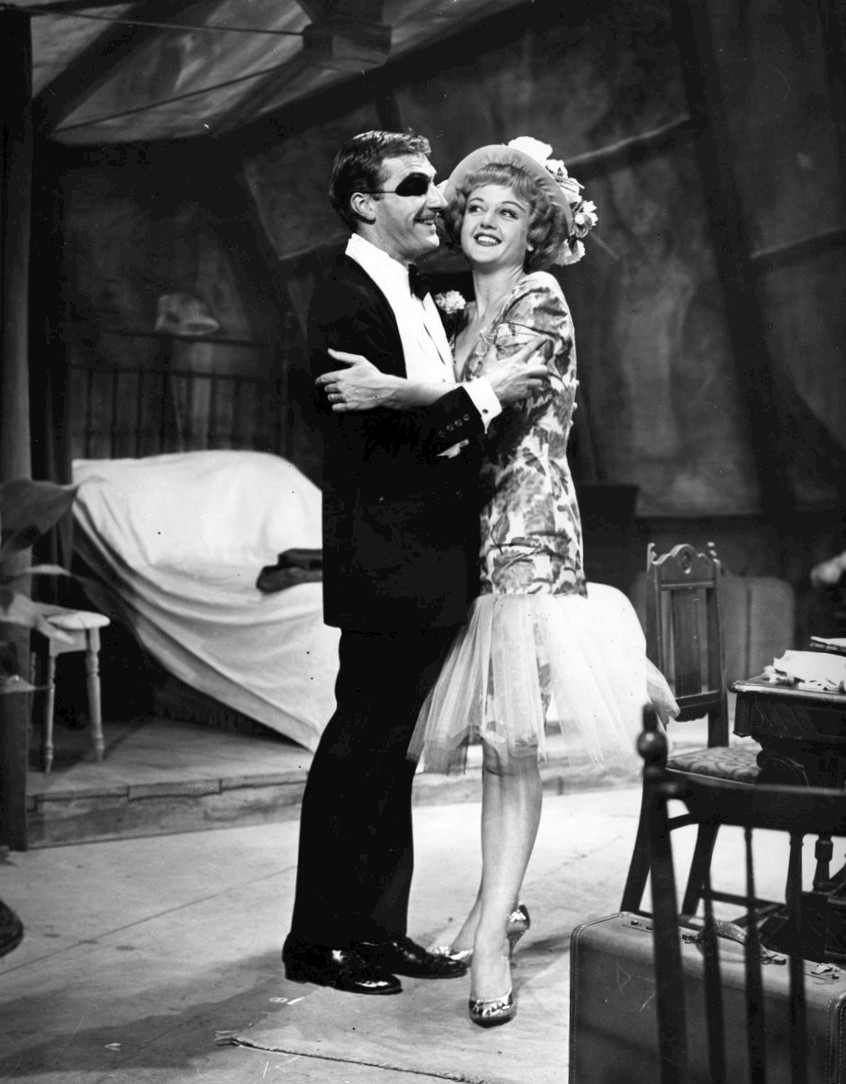
In A Taste of Honey (1960) with Nigel Davenport

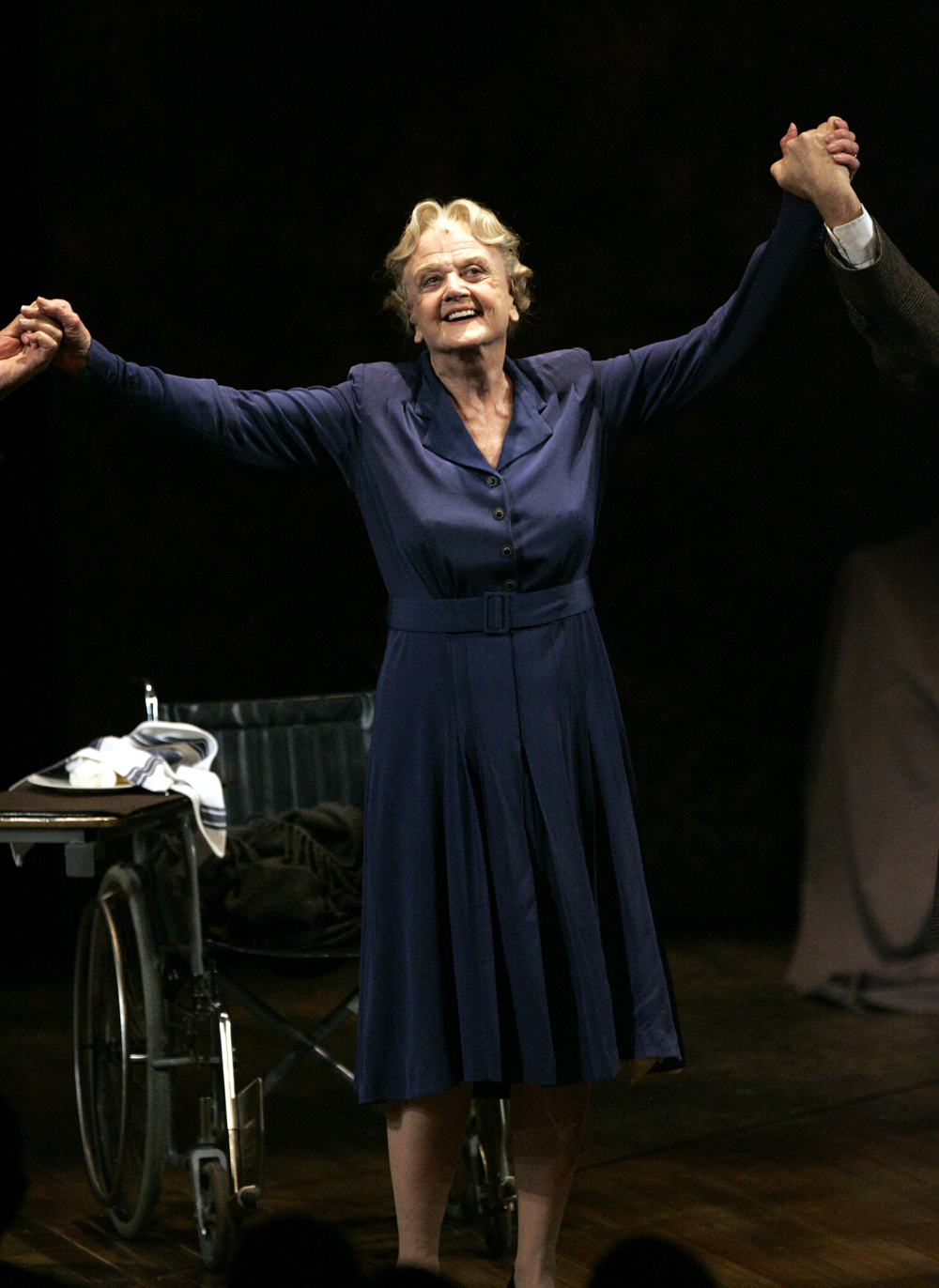
In Driving Miss Daisy (2013)

List of theatre credits
Year(s)	Title	Role	Theatre	Notes	Ref(s)
1952	The Gramercy Ghost	Nancy Willard	Unknown	Summer tour	
1952	Affairs of State	Irene Elliott	Bucks County Playhouse	Summer tour	
1957	Hotel Paradiso	Marcelle	Henry Miller's Theatre	11 April – 13 July	
1960–1961	A Taste of Honey	Helen	Lyceum Theatre	4 October 1960 – 15 April 1961	
1964	Anyone Can Whistle	Cora Hoover Hooper	Majestic Theatre	4–11 April	
1966–1968	Mame	Mame Dennis	Winter Garden Theatre	18 May 1966 – 30 March 1968	
1969	Dear World	Countess Aurelia	Mark Hellinger Theatre	6 February – 31 May	
1971	Prettybelle	Prettybelle Sweet	Shubert Theatre	1 February – 6 March	
1972	All Over	The Mistress	Aldwych Theatre		
1973–1975	Gypsy	Rose	Piccadilly Theatre; Winter Garden Theatre	29 May – December 1973; 23 September 1974 – 4 January 1975	
1975–1976	Hamlet	Gertrude	National Theatre		
1978	The King and I	Anna Leonowens	Uris Theatre	11–30 April (replacement for Constance Towers)	
1979–1981	Sweeney Todd: The Demon Barber of Fleet Street	Mrs. Nellie Lovett	Uris Theatre; John F. Kennedy Center for the Performing Arts; Shubert Theatre; Boston Metropolitan Theatre; Arie Crown Theater; Golden Gate Theatre; Dorothy Chandler Pavilion	Broadway; American tour	
1982	A Little Family Business	Lillian Ridley	Ahmanson Theatre; Martin Beck Theatre	8 October – 20 November; 15–26 December	
1983	Mame	Mame Dennis	Gershwin Theatre	24 July – 28 August	
2007	Deuce	Leona Mullen	Music Box Theatre	6 May – 19 August	
2009	Blithe Spirit	Madame Arcati	Shubert Theatre	15 March – 19 July	
2009–2010	A Little Night Music	Madame Armfeldt	Walter Kerr Theatre	24 November 2009 – 20 June 2010	
2012	The Best Man	Mrs. Sue-Ellen Gamadge	Gerald Schoenfeld Theatre	1 April – 22 July	
2013	Driving Miss Daisy	Miss Daisy Werthan	Queensland Performing Arts Centre; Theatre Royal, Sydney; Comedy Theatre, Melbourne; Her Majesty's Theatre, Adelaide; His Majesty's Theatre, Perth	Australian tour	
2014–2015	Blithe Spirit	Madame Arcati	Gielgud Theatre; Ahmanson Theatre; Golden Gate Theatre; Princess of Wales Theatre; National Theatre	West End; North American tour	
2017	The Chalk Garden	Mrs. St. Maugham	Hunter College	19 June	
2019	The Importance of Being Earnest	Lady Bracknell	American Airlines Theatre	18 November	
2021	Beauty and the Beast	The Narrator		UK Tour (prerecorded prologue)	

== Video games ==
Year	Title	Role(s)	Notes	Ref(s)
2000	Disney's Beauty and the Beast Magical Ballroom	Mrs. Potts (voice)		
2005	Kingdom Hearts II	Mrs. Potts (voice)		
2007	Kingdom Hearts II: Final Mix+	Mrs. Potts (voice)		

== Miscellaneous ==
Year	Title	Role(s)	Notes	Ref(s)
1988	Angela Lansbury's Positive Moves: A Personal Plan for Fitness and Well-Being at Any Age	Herself	Exercise video	
