= Angela Lansbury =

British actress (1925–2022)

Dame Angela Lansbury DBE
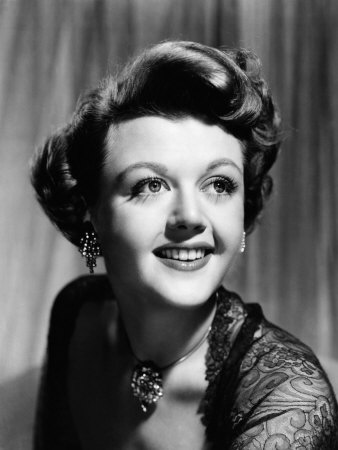
- Lansbury in 1950
- Born: Angela Brigid Lansbury; 16 October 1925; London, England
- Died: 11 October 2022 (aged 96); Los Angeles, California, US
- Citizenship: United Kingdom; United States (from 1951); Ireland (after 1970)
- Occupations: Actress; singer
- Years active: 1942–2022
- Works: Full list
- Spouses: Richard Cromwell (m. 1945; div. 1946); Peter Shaw (m. 1949; died 2003)
- Children: 2
- Parents: Edgar Lansbury (father); Moyna Macgill (mother)
- Relatives: Bruce Lansbury (brother); Edgar Lansbury (brother); George Lansbury (grandfather); Oliver Postgate (cousin); Coral Lansbury (cousin)
- Awards: Full list

Dame Angela Brigid Lansbury (16 October 1925 – 11 October 2022) was an Irish-British and American actress and singer. In a career spanning 80 years, she played various roles across film, stage, and television. Although based for much of her life in the United States, her work attracted international attention.

Lansbury was born into an upper-middle-class family in central London, the daughter of Irish actress Moyna Macgill and British politician Edgar Lansbury. To escape the Blitz, she moved to the United States in 1940, studying acting in New York City. Proceeding to Hollywood in 1942, she signed with Metro-Goldwyn-Mayer (MGM) and obtained her first film roles in Gaslight (1944), National Velvet (1944), and The Picture of Dorian Gray (1945). She appeared in 11 further MGM films, mostly in minor roles, and after her contract ended in 1952, she began to supplement her cinematic work with theatrical appearances. Lansbury was largely seen as a B-list star during this period, but her role in The Manchurian Candidate (1962) received widespread acclaim and is frequently ranked as one of her best performances. Moving into musical theatre, Lansbury gained stardom for playing the leading role in the Broadway musical Mame (1966), winning her first Tony Award.

Amid difficulties in her personal life, Lansbury moved from California to Ireland's County Cork in 1970. She continued to make theatrical and cinematic appearances throughout that decade, including leading roles in the stage musicals Dear World, Gypsy, and Sweeney Todd, as well as in the Disney film Bedknobs and Broomsticks (1971). Moving into television in 1984, she achieved worldwide fame as the sleuth Jessica Fletcher in the American whodunit series Murder, She Wrote, which ran for 12 seasons until 1996, becoming one of the longest-running and most popular detective drama series in television history. In 1989, Corymore Productions, a company that she co-owned with her husband Peter Shaw, began co-producing the series with Universal, and Lansbury also became its executive producer during its final four seasons. She also moved into voice work, contributing to animated films like Beauty and the Beast (1991) and Anastasia (1997). In the 21st century, she toured in several theatrical productions and appeared in family films such as Nanny McPhee (2005) and Mary Poppins Returns (2018).

Among Lansbury's accolades are six Tony Awards (including a Lifetime Achievement Award), six Golden Globe Awards, two honorary BAFTA Awards, a Laurence Olivier Award, an honorary SAG Award, and the Academy Honorary Award, in addition to nominations for three Academy Awards, 18 Primetime Emmy Awards, and a Grammy Award. In 2014, she was made a dame by Queen Elizabeth II.

== Early life and career beginnings ==
=== Childhood: 1925–1942 ===
Angela Brigid Lansbury was born to an upper-middle-class family on 16 October 1925. Although her birthplace has often been given as Poplar, East London, she rejected this, stating that while she had ancestral connections to Poplar, she was born in Regent's Park, Central London. (Note: In a 2014 interview for BBC Radio 4, she stated: "I want to make one thing clear: I was not born in Poplar, that's not true, I was born in Regent's Park, so I wasn't born in the East End, I wish I could say I had been. Certainly my antecedents were: my grandfather, my father." (mins 3–4)) Her mother was Belfast-born Irish Moyna MacGill (born Charlotte Lillian McIldowie), an actress who regularly appeared on stage in London's West End and who also appeared in several films. Her father was the wealthy British timber merchant and politician Edgar Lansbury, a member of the Communist Party of Great Britain and former mayor of the Metropolitan Borough of Poplar. Her paternal grandfather was the Labour Party leader George Lansbury, a man whom she felt "awed" by and considered "a giant in my youth". Angela had an older half-sister, Isolde, from Macgill's previous marriage to Reginald Denham. In January 1930, Macgill gave birth to twin boys, Bruce and Edgar, leading the Lansburys to move from their Poplar flat to a house in Mill Hill, then Middlesex; at weekends, they would stay at a farm in Berrick Salome, Oxfordshire.

I'm eternally grateful for the Irish side of me. That's where I got my sense of comedy and whimsy. As for the English half–that's my reserved side ... But put me onstage, and the Irish comes out. The combination makes a good mix for acting.

— Angela Lansbury.

When Lansbury was nine, her father died from stomach cancer; she retreated into playing characters as a coping mechanism. Facing financial difficulty, her mother entered a relationship with a Scottish colonel, Leckie Forbes, and moved into his house in Hampstead. Lansbury then received an education at South Hampstead High School from 1934 until 1939, where she was a contemporary of Glynis Johns. She nevertheless considered herself largely self-educated, learning from books, theatre and cinema. Lansbury became a self-professed "complete movie maniac", visiting the cinema regularly. Keen on playing the piano, she briefly studied music at the Ritman School of Dancing, and in 1940 began studying acting at the Webber Douglas School of Singing and Dramatic Art in Kensington, west London, first appearing onstage as a lady-in-waiting in the school's production of Maxwell Anderson's Mary of Scotland.

That year, Lansbury's grandfather died, and with the onset of the Blitz, Macgill decided to take Angela, Bruce and Edgar to the United States; Isolde remained in Britain with her new husband, the actor Peter Ustinov. Macgill secured a job supervising 60 British children who were being evacuated to North America aboard the Duchess of Atholl, arriving with them in Montreal, Canada, in August 1940. Macgill then proceeded by train to New York City, where she was financially sponsored by a Wall Street businessman, Charles T. Smith, moving in with his family at their home at Mahopac, New York. Lansbury gained a scholarship from the American Theatre Wing to study at the Feagin School of Drama and Radio, where she appeared in performances of William Congreve's The Way of the World and Oscar Wilde's Lady Windermere's Fan. She graduated in March 1942, by which time the family had moved to an apartment on Morton Street, Greenwich Village.

=== Career breakthrough: 1942–1945 ===
Macgill secured work in a Canadian touring production of Tonight at 8:30 and was joined by her daughter. There, the 16-year-old Lansbury landed her first theatrical job as a nightclub act at the Samovar Club, Montreal, claiming to be 19 and singing songs by Noël Coward. Lansbury returned to New York City in August 1942, but her mother had moved to Hollywood, Los Angeles, to resurrect her cinematic career; Lansbury and her brothers followed. Moving into a bungalow in Laurel Canyon, both Lansbury and her mother obtained Christmas jobs at the Bullocks Wilshire department store in Los Angeles; Macgill was sacked for incompetence, leaving the family to subsist on Lansbury's wages of $28 a week. Befriending a group of gay men, Lansbury became privy to the city's underground gay scene. She and her mother attended lectures by the spiritual guru Jiddu Krishnamurti – and at one of such lectures, they met the writer Aldous Huxley.

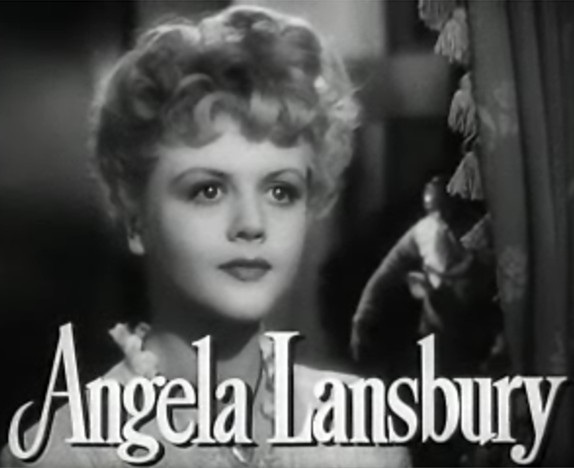
Lansbury in the trailer for The Picture of Dorian Gray

At a party hosted by her mother, Lansbury met John van Druten, who had recently co-authored a script for Gaslight (1944), a mystery-thriller based on Patrick Hamilton's 1938 play Gas Light. The film was being directed by George Cukor with Ingrid Bergman in the lead role of Paula Alquist, a woman in Victorian London being psychologically tormented by her husband. Druten suggested that Lansbury would be perfect for the role of Nancy Oliver, a cockney maid; she was accepted for the part, although, since she was only 17, a social worker had to accompany her on the set. After getting an agent, Earl Kramer, Lansbury signed a seven-year contract with MGM, earning $500 a week. Gaslight received critical acclaim, and Lansbury's performance was widely praised, earning her a nomination for the Academy Award for Best Supporting Actress.

Her next film appearance was as Edwina Brown in National Velvet (1944); the film became a major commercial success, and Lansbury developed a lifelong friendship with co-star Elizabeth Taylor. Lansbury next starred in The Picture of Dorian Gray (1945), a cinematic adaptation of Oscar Wilde's 1890 novel of the same name, which was again set in Victorian London. Directed by Albert Lewin, Lansbury was cast as Sybil Vane, a working-class music hall singer who falls in love with the protagonist, Dorian Gray (Hurd Hatfield). Although the film was not a financial success, Lansbury's performance once more drew praise, earning her a Golden Globe Award, and she was again nominated for Best Supporting Actress at the Academy Awards, losing to Anne Revere, her co-star in National Velvet.

=== Later MGM films: 1945–1951 ===
On 27 September 1945, Lansbury married Richard Cromwell, an artist and decorator whose acting career had come to a standstill. Their marriage was troubled; Cromwell was gay and had married Lansbury in the unsuccessful hope that it would turn him heterosexual. Lansbury filed for divorce within a year, being granted a decree on 11 September 1946, but the couple remained friends until his death. In December 1946 she was introduced to fellow English expatriate Peter Pullen Shaw at a party held by former co-star Hurd Hatfield in Ojai Valley. Shaw was an aspiring actor, also signed to MGM, and had recently left a relationship with Joan Crawford. He and Lansbury became a couple, living together before she proposed marriage. They wanted a wedding in Britain, but the Church of England refused to marry divorced persons. Instead, they wed at St. Columba's Church, a place of worship under the jurisdiction of the Church of Scotland, in Knightsbridge, London, in August 1949, followed by a honeymoon in France. Returning to the US, they settled into Lansbury's home in Rustic Canyon, Malibu. In 1951, the couple both became naturalized US citizens, albeit retaining their British citizenship via dual nationality.

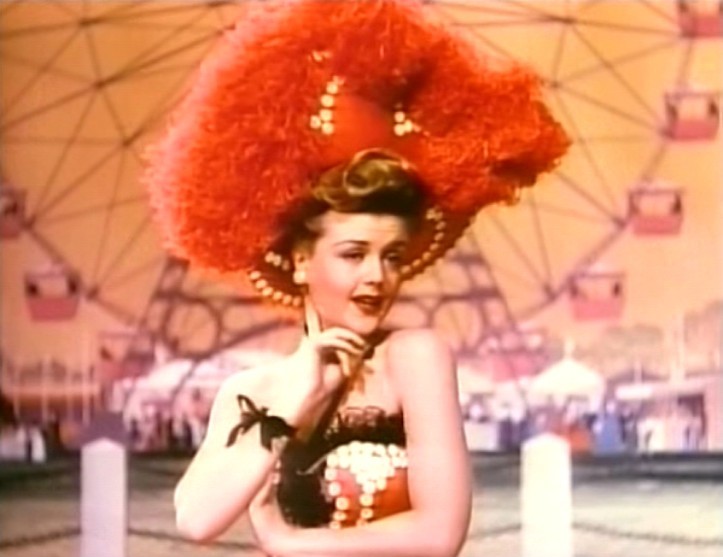
Lansbury in a scene from MGM's Till the Clouds Roll By (1946), one of her earliest film appearances

Following the success of Gaslight and The Picture of Dorian Gray, MGM cast Lansbury in 11 further films until her contract with the company ended in 1952. Keeping her among their B-list stars, MGM used her less than their similarly aged actresses; Lansbury biographers Rob Edelman and Audrey E. Kupferberg believed that the majority of these films were "mediocre", doing little to further her career. This view was echoed by Cukor, who believed Lansbury had been "consistently miscast" by MGM. She was repeatedly made to portray older women, often villainous, and as a result she became increasingly dissatisfied with working for MGM, commenting that "I kept wanting to play the Jean Arthur roles, and Mr Mayer kept casting me as a series of venal bitches." The company was suffering from the post-1948 slump in cinema sales, which resulted in slashing film budgets and cutting their number of staff.

In 1946, Lansbury played her first American character as Em, a honky-tonk saloon singer in the Oscar-winning Wild West musical The Harvey Girls; her singing was dubbed by Virginia Reese. She appeared in The Hoodlum Saint (1946), Till the Clouds Roll By (1947), If Winter Comes (1947), Tenth Avenue Angel (1948), The Three Musketeers (1948), State of the Union (1948), and The Red Danube (1949). Lansbury was loaned out by MGM first to United Artists for The Private Affairs of Bel Ami (1947) and then to Paramount for Samson and Delilah (1949). She appeared as a villainous maidservant in Kind Lady (1951) and as a French adventuress in Mutiny (1952). Turning to radio, in 1948 Lansbury appeared in an audio adaptation of Somerset Maugham's Of Human Bondage for NBC University Theatre, and the following year she starred in their adaptation of Jane Austen's Pride and Prejudice. Moving into television, she appeared in a 1950 episode of Robert Montgomery Presents adapted from A.J. Cronin's The Citadel.

== Mid career ==
=== The Manchurian Candidate and minor roles: 1952–1965 ===
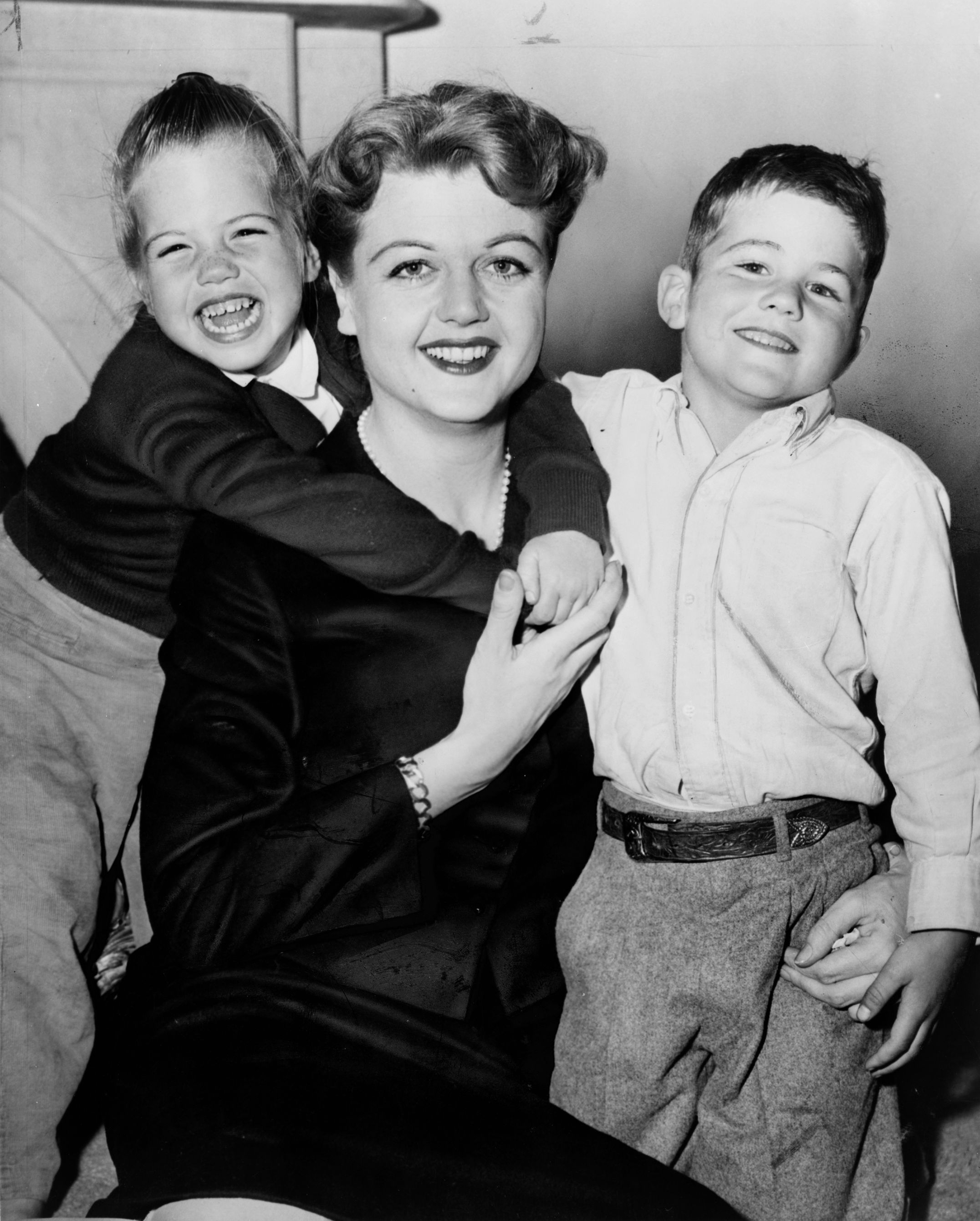
Lansbury with her children in 1957

Unhappy with the roles that MGM was assigning to her, Lansbury instructed her manager, Harry Friedman of MCA Inc., to terminate her contract in 1952. That same year, she gave birth to her first child Anthony. Soon after his birth, she joined the East Coast touring productions of two former Broadway plays: Howard Lindsay and Russel Crouse's Remains to be Seen and Louis Verneuil's Affairs of State. Biographer Margaret Bonanno later stated that at this point, Lansbury's career had "hit an all-time low". In April 1953 her daughter Deirdre Angela Shaw was born. Shaw had a son, David, from a previous marriage and brought him to California to live with the family after gaining legal custody of the boy in 1953. Now with three children to care for, Lansbury moved to a larger house on San Vicente Boulevard in Santa Monica. Lansbury did not feel entirely comfortable in the Hollywood social scene, later commenting that as a result of her British roots, "in Hollywood, I always felt like a stranger in a strange land." In 1959 the family moved to Malibu, settling into a house that had been designed by Aaron Green on the Pacific Coast Highway. There she and Peter escaped the Hollywood scene and sent their children to public school.

Returning to cinema as a freelance actress, Lansbury found herself typecast as an older, maternal figure in most of her films during this period. She later stated that "Hollywood made me old before my time", noting that in her twenties she was receiving fan mail from people who thought her in her forties. She obtained minor roles in such films as A Life at Stake (1954), A Lawless Street (1955), and The Purple Mask (1955), describing the latter as "the worst movie I ever made." She played Princess Gwendolyn in the comedy film The Court Jester (1956) before taking on the role of a wife who kills her husband in Please Murder Me (1956). From there she appeared as Minnie Littlejohn in The Long Hot Summer (1958) and as Mabel Claremont in The Reluctant Debutante (1958), which was filmed in Paris. Biographer Martin Gottfried has claimed that it was these latter two cinematic appearances which restored Lansbury's status as an "A-picture actress." Throughout this period she continued making television appearances, starring in episodes of The Revlon Mirror Theater, Ford Theatre, and The George Gobel Show, and she became a regular on the game show Pantomime Quiz.

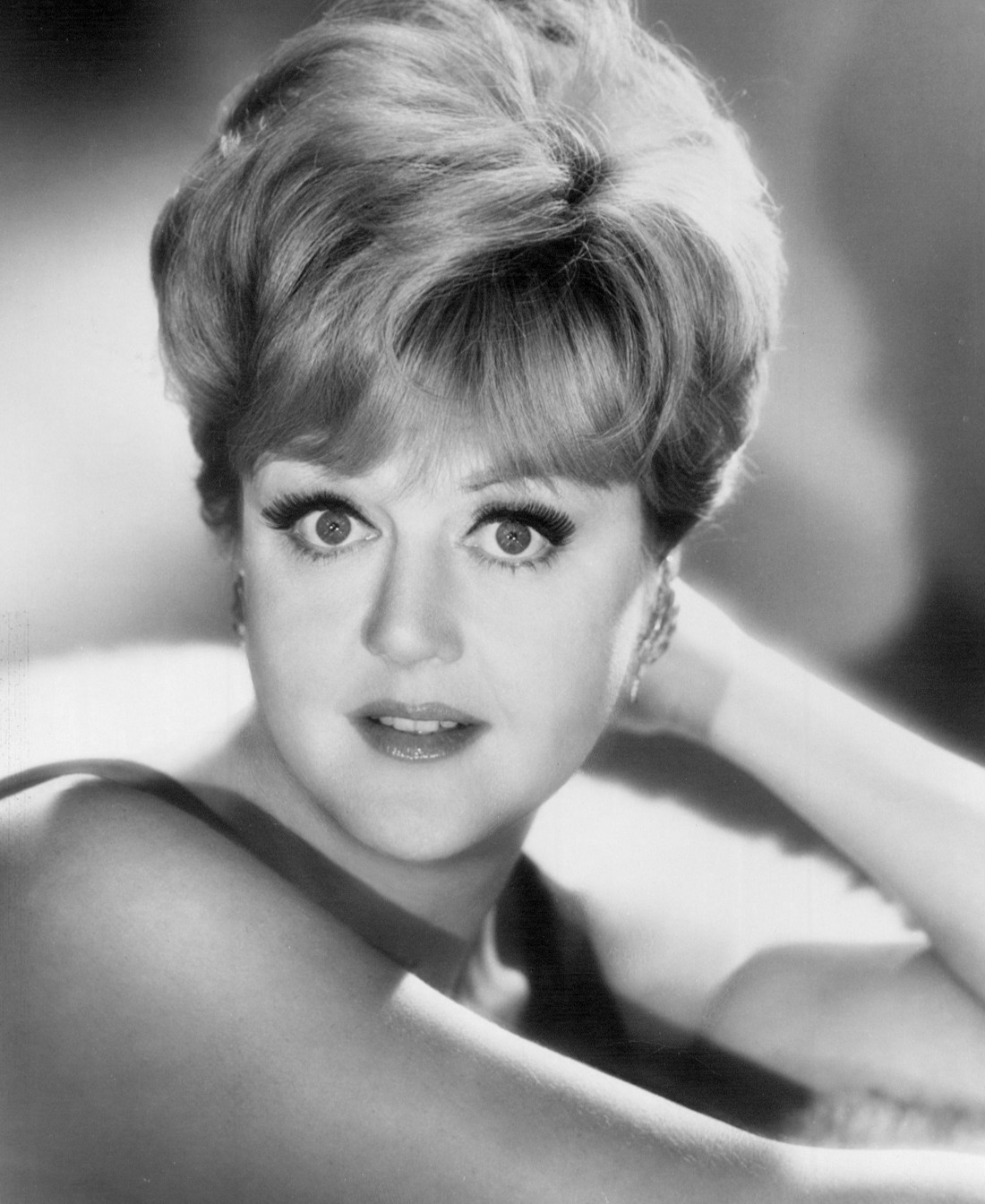
Lansbury in a publicity shot from 1966

In April 1957, she debuted on Broadway at the Henry Miller Theatre in Hotel Paradiso, a French burlesque directed by Peter Glenville. The play only ran for 15 weeks, but she earned good reviews for her role as Marcel Cat. She later stated that had she not appeared in the play, her "whole career would have fizzled out." Into the 1960s she followed this with an appearance in a Broadway performance of A Taste of Honey at the Lyceum Theatre, directed by Tony Richardson and George Devine. Lansbury played Helen, the boorish, verbally abusive mother of Josephine (played by Joan Plowright, only four years Lansbury's junior), remarking that she gained "a great deal of satisfaction" from the role. During the show's run, Lansbury developed a friendship with both Plowright and Plowright's lover Laurence Olivier; it was from Lansbury's rented flat on East 97th Street that Plowright and Olivier eloped to be married.

After a well-reviewed turn in Summer of the Seventeenth Doll (1959) – shot in Australia – and a minor role in A Breath of Scandal (1960), Lansbury appeared in 1961's Blue Hawaii as the mother of a character played by Elvis Presley, just ten years her junior. Although believing that the film was of poor quality, she commented that she agreed to appear in it because she "was desperate". Her role as Mavis in The Dark at the Top of the Stairs (1960) drew critical acclaim, as did her performance in All Fall Down (1962) as a manipulative, destructive mother. In 1962 she appeared in the Cold War thriller The Manchurian Candidate as Eleanor Iselin, cast in the role by John Frankenheimer. Although Lansbury played actor Laurence Harvey's mother in the film, she was in fact only three years older. She had agreed to work on the film after reading the original novel, describing it as "one of the most exciting political books I ever read". Biographers Edelman and Kupferberg considered this role "her enduring cinematic triumph," while Gottfried stated that it was "the strongest, the most memorable and the best picture she ever made... she gives her finest film performance in it." Lansbury received her third Best Supporting Actress Academy Award nomination for the film.

She followed this with a performance as Sybil Logan in In the Cool of the Day (1963) – a film she denounced as awful – before appearing as wealthy Isabel Boyd in The World of Henry Orient (1964) and the widow Phyllis in Dear Heart (1964). Her first appearance in a theatrical musical was the short-lived Anyone Can Whistle, written by Arthur Laurents and Stephen Sondheim. An experimental work in which Lansbury played the role of crooked mayoress Cora Hoover Hooper, it opened at the Majestic Theatre on Broadway in April 1964 but was critically panned, closing after nine performances. Although she loved Sondheim's score, she experienced personal differences with Laurents and was glad when the show closed. She appeared in The Greatest Story Ever Told (1965), a cinematic biopic of Jesus, but was cut almost entirely from the final edit. She followed this up with appearances as Mama Jean Bello in Harlow (1965), as Lady Blystone in The Amorous Adventures of Moll Flanders (1965), and as Gloria in Mister Buddwing (1966). Despite her cinematic roles being well received, "celluloid superstardom" evaded Lansbury, and she became increasingly dissatisfied with these supporting roles, feeling that none allowed her to explore her potential as an actress.

=== Mame and theatrical stardom: 1966–1969 ===
I was a wife and a mother, and I was completely fulfilled. But my husband recognised the signals in me which said 'I've been doing enough gardening, I've cooked enough good dinners, I've sat around the house and mooned about what more interior decoration I can get my fingers into.' It's a curious thing with actors and actresses, but suddenly the alarm goes off. My husband is a very sensitive person to my moods and he recognised the fact that I had to get on with something. Mame came along out of the blue just at this time. Now isn't that a miracle?.

— Angela Lansbury.

In 1966, Lansbury took on the title role of Mame Dennis in the musical Mame, Jerry Herman's musical adaptation of the 1955 novel Auntie Mame (written by Patrick Dennis). The director's first choice for the role had been Rosalind Russell, who played Mame in the 1958 non-musical film adaptation, but she had declined. Lansbury actively sought the role in the hope that it would mark a change in her career. When she was chosen, it came as a surprise to theatre critics, who believed that the part would go to a better-known actress; Lansbury was 41 years old, and it was her first starring role. Mame Dennis was a glamorous character, with more than 20 costume changes throughout the play, and Lansbury's role involved 10 songs and dance routines for which she trained extensively. First appearing in Philadelphia and then Boston, Mame opened at the Winter Garden Theatre on Broadway in May 1966. Auntie Mame was already popular among the gay community, and Mame garnered Lansbury a cult gay following, something that she later attributed to the fact that Mame Dennis was "every gay person's idea of glamour... Everything about Mame coincided with every young man's idea of beauty and glory and it was lovely."

Reviews of Lansbury's performance were overwhelmingly positive. In The New York Times Stanley Kauffmann wrote: "Miss Lansbury is a singing-dancing actress, not a singer or dancer who also acts... In this marathon role she has wit, poise, warmth and a very taking coolth." The role resulted in Lansbury receiving her first Tony Award for Best Leading Actress in a Musical. Lansbury's later biographer Margaret Bonanno claimed that Mame made Lansbury a "superstar", with the actress herself commenting on her success: "Everyone loves you, everyone loves the success, and enjoys it as much as you do. And it lasts as long as you are on that stage and as long as you keep coming out of that stage door."

Off the stage, Lansbury made further television appearances, such as on Perry Como's Thanksgiving Special in November 1966. She also engaged in high-profile charitable endeavours—for instance, appearing as the guest of honour at the 1967 March of Dimes annual benefit luncheon. She was invited to star in a musical performance for the 1968 Academy Awards ceremony and co-hosted that year's Tony Awards with former brother-in-law Peter Ustinov. That year, Harvard University's Hasty Pudding Club elected her "Woman of the Year". When the film adaptation of Mame was put into production, Lansbury hoped to be offered the part, but it instead went to Lucille Ball, an established box-office success. Lansbury considered this to be "one of my bitterest disappointments". Her personal life was further complicated when she learned that both of her children had become involved with the counterculture of the 1960s and had been using recreational drugs. As a result, Anthony had become addicted to cocaine and heroin.

Lansbury followed the success of Mame with a performance as Countess Aurelia, the 75-year-old Parisian eccentric in Dear World, a musical adaptation of Jean Giraudoux's The Madwoman of Chaillot. The show opened at Broadway's Mark Hellinger Theatre in February 1969, but Lansbury found it a "pretty depressing" experience. Reviews of her performance were positive, and she was awarded her second Tony Award on the basis of it. Reviews of the show were more generally critical, however, and it closed after 132 performances. She followed this with an appearance in the title role of the musical Prettybelle, based on Jean Arnold's Prettybelle: A Lively Tale of Rape and Resurrection. Set in the Deep South, it dealt with issues of racism, with Lansbury playing a wealthy alcoholic who seeks sexual encounters with black men. The play opened in Boston but received poor reviews and was cancelled before it reached Broadway. Lansbury later described the play as "a complete and utter fiasco", admitting that in her opinion, her "performance was awful".

=== Ireland and Gypsy: 1970–1978 ===
In the early 1970s, Lansbury declined several cinematic roles, including the lead in The Killing of Sister George and the role of Nurse Ratched in One Flew Over the Cuckoo's Nest because she was not satisfied with them. Instead she accepted the role of the Countess von Ornstein, an ageing German aristocrat who falls in love with a younger man, in Something for Everyone (1970), for which she filmed on location in Hohenschwangau, Bavaria. That same year, she appeared as the middle-aged English witch Eglantine Price in the Disney film Bedknobs and Broomsticks; this was her first lead in a screen musical and led to her publicizing the film on television programmes like the David Frost Show. She later noted that as a big commercial success, this film "secured an enormous audience for me". The year 1970 was a traumatic one for the Lansbury family, as Peter underwent a hip replacement, Anthony suffered a heroin overdose and fell into a coma, and the family's Malibu home was destroyed in a brush fire. They then purchased Knockmourne Glebe, a farmhouse built in the 1820s which was located near Conna in rural County Cork, and after Anthony quit using cocaine and heroin, they took him there to recover from his drug addiction. He subsequently enrolled in the Webber-Douglas School, his mother's alma mater, and became a professional actor before moving into television directing. Lansbury and her husband did not return to California, instead dividing their time between Cork and New York City, where they lived in a flat opposite the Lincoln Center.

[In Ireland, our gardener] had no idea who I was. Nobody there did. I was just Mrs. Shaw, which suited me down to the ground. I had absolute anonymity in those days, which was wonderful.

— Angela Lansbury.

In 1972, Lansbury returned to London's West End to perform in the Royal Shakespeare Company's theatrical production of Edward Albee's All Over at the Aldwych Theatre. She portrayed the mistress of a dying New England millionaire, and although the play's reviews were mixed, Lansbury's acting was widely praised. This was followed by her reluctant involvement in a revival of Mame, which was then touring the United States, after which she returned to the West End to play the character of Rose in the musical Gypsy. She had initially turned down the role, not wishing to be in the shadow of Ethel Merman, who had portrayed the character in the original Broadway production. When the show started in May 1973, Lansbury earned a standing ovation and rave reviews. Settling into a Belgravia flat, she was soon in demand among London society, having dinners held in her honour. Following the culmination of the London run in 1974, Gypsy toured the US; in Chicago, Lansbury was awarded the Sarah Siddons Award for her performance. The show eventually reached Broadway, where it ran until January 1975. A critical success, it earned Lansbury her third Tony Award. After several months' break, Gypsy toured the U.S. again in the summer of 1975.

Wishing to move on from musicals, Lansbury won the role of Gertrude in the National Theatre Company's production of William Shakespeare's Hamlet, staged at the Old Vic. Directed by Peter Hall, the production ran from December 1975 to May 1976 and received mixed reviews. Lansbury disliked the role, later commenting that she found it "very trying playing restrained roles" such as Gertrude. Her mood was worsened by her mother's death in November 1975. Her next theatrical appearance was in two one-act plays by Albee, Counting the Ways and Listening, performed side by side at the Hartford Stage Company in Connecticut. Reviews of the production were mixed, although Lansbury was again singled out for praise. This was followed by another revival tour of Gypsy. In April 1978 Lansbury appeared in 24 performances of a revival of the musical The King and I staged at Broadway's Uris Theatre; Lansbury played the role of Mrs Anna, replacing Constance Towers, who was on a short break. Her first cinematic role in seven years was as novelist Salome Otterbourne in a 1978 adaptation of Agatha Christie's Death on the Nile, filmed in both London and Egypt. In the film Lansbury starred alongside Peter Ustinov and Bette Davis, who became a close friend. The role earned Lansbury the National Board of Review award for Best Supporting Actress of 1978.

=== Sweeney Todd and continued cinematic work: 1979–1984 ===
In March 1979, Lansbury appeared as Nellie Lovett in Sweeney Todd: The Demon Barber of Fleet Street, a Sondheim musical directed by Harold Prince. Opening at the Uris Theatre, she starred alongside Len Cariou as Sweeney Todd, the murderous barber in 19th-century London. After being offered the role, she jumped on the opportunity because of Sondheim's involvement, commenting that she loved "the extraordinary wit and intelligence of his lyrics." She remained in the role for 14 months before being replaced by Dorothy Loudon; the musical received mixed critical reviews, although earned Lansbury her fourth Tony Award and After Dark magazine's Ruby Award for Broadway Performer of the Year. She returned to the role in October 1980 for a ten-month US tour; the production was also filmed and broadcast on the Entertainment Channel. In 1982, Lansbury took on the role of an upper middle-class housewife who champions workers' rights in A Little Family Business, a farce set in Baltimore in which her son Anthony also starred. It debuted at Los Angeles' Ahmanson Theatre before moving to Broadway's Martin Beck Theatre. It was critically panned and faced protests from California's Japanese-American community for including anti-Japanese slurs. That year, Lansbury was inducted into the American Theatre Hall of Fame, and the following year appeared in a Mame revival at Broadway's Gershwin Theatre. Although Lansbury was praised, the revival was a commercial failure, with Lansbury noting: "I realised that it's not a show of today. It's a period piece."

A small number of people have seen me on the stage. [Television] is a chance for me to play to a vast US public, and I think that's a chance you don't pass up... I'm interested in reaching everybody. I don't want to reach just the people who can pay forty-five or fifty dollars for a [theatre] seat.

— Angela Lansbury.

Working in cinema, in 1979 Lansbury appeared as Miss Froy in The Lady Vanishes, a remake of Alfred Hitchcock's 1938 film. The following year she appeared in The Mirror Crack'd, another film based on an Agatha Christie novel, this time as Miss Marple, a sleuth in 1950s Kent. Lansbury hoped to get away from the depiction of the role made famous by Margaret Rutherford, instead returning to Christie's description of the character. She was signed to appear in two sequels as Miss Marple, but these were never made. Lansbury's next film was the animated The Last Unicorn (1982), for which she provided the voice of the witch Mommy Fortuna. Returning to musical cinema, she starred as Ruth in The Pirates of Penzance (1983), a film based on Gilbert and Sullivan's comic opera of the same name, and while filming it in London sang on a recording of The Beggar's Opera. This was followed by an appearance as the grandmother in Gothic fantasy film The Company of Wolves (1984). Lansbury had also begun work for television, appearing in a 1982 television film with Bette Davis titled Little Gloria... Happy at Last. She followed this with an appearance in CBS's The Gift of Love: A Christmas Story (1983), later describing it as "the most unsophisticated thing you can imagine." A BBC television film followed, A Talent for Murder (1984), in which she played a wheelchair-user mystery writer; although describing it as "a rush job", she agreed to do it in order to work with co-star Laurence Olivier. Two further miniseries featuring Lansbury appeared in 1984: Lace and The First Olympics: Athens 1896.

== Global fame ==
=== Murder, She Wrote: 1984–2003 ===
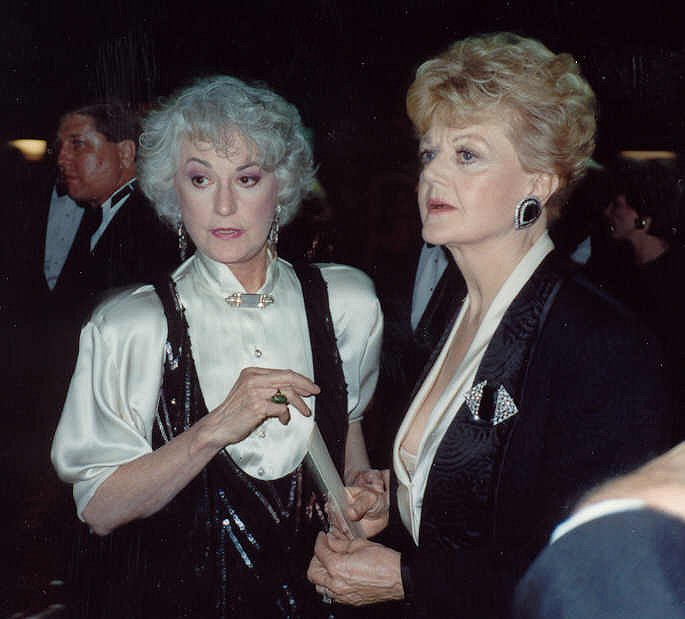
Lansbury with Mame original Broadway cast member Bea Arthur at the 41st Primetime Emmy Awards in 1989

In 1983, Lansbury was offered two main television roles, one in a sitcom and the other in a detective drama series, Murder, She Wrote. As she was unable to do both, her agents advised her to accept the former, but Lansbury chose the latter. Her decision was based on the appeal of the series' central character, Jessica Fletcher, a retired school teacher from the fictional town of Cabot Cove, Maine. As portrayed by Lansbury, Fletcher was a successful detective novelist who also solved murders encountered during her travels. Lansbury described the character as "an American Miss Marple".

Murder, She Wrote had been created by Peter S. Fischer, Richard Levinson, and William Link, who had earlier had success with Columbo, and the role of Fletcher had been first offered to Jean Stapleton, who had declined it. The pilot episode, "The Murder of Sherlock Holmes", premiered on CBS on September 30, 1984, with the rest of the first season airing on Sundays from 8 to 9 pm. Although critical reviews were mixed, it proved highly popular, with the pilot having a Nielsen rating of 18.9 and the first season being rated top in its time slot. Designed as inoffensive family viewing, as despite its topic the show eschewed depicting violence or gore, it followed the "whodunit" format rather than those of most US crime shows of the time. Lansbury herself commented that "best of all, there's no violence. I hate violence."

Lansbury exerted creative input over Fletcher's costumes, makeup and hair, and rejected pressure from network executives to put the character in a relationship, believing that the character should remain a strong single woman. When she believed that a scriptwriter had made Fletcher do or say things that did not fit with the character's personality, Lansbury ensured that the script was changed. She saw Fletcher as a role model for older female viewers, praising her "enormous, universal appeal – that was an accomplishment I never expected in my entire life." Edelman and Kupferberg described the series as "a television landmark" in the US for having an older female character as the protagonist, paving the way for later series like The Golden Girls. Lansbury commented that "I think it's the first time a show has really been aimed at the middle aged audience", and although it was most popular among senior citizens, it gradually gained a younger audience; by 1991, a third of viewers were under fifty. It gained continually high ratings throughout most of its run, outdoing rivals in its time slot such as Steven Spielberg's Amazing Stories on NBC. In 1987, a spin-off was produced, The Law & Harry McGraw, although it proved short-lived.

As Murder, She Wrote went on, Lansbury assumed a larger role behind the scenes. In 1989, her own company, Corymore Productions, began co-producing the show with Universal. Lansbury began to tire of the series, and in particular the long working hours, stating that the 1990–1991 season would be its last. She changed her mind after being appointed executive producer for the 1992–1993 season, something that she felt "made it far more interesting to me." For the seventh season, the show's primary setting moved to New York City, where Fletcher had taken a job teaching criminology at Manhattan University; the move, encouraged by Lansbury, was an attempt to attract younger viewers. Having become a "Sunday-night institution" in the US, the show's ratings improved during the early 1990s, becoming a Top Five programme.

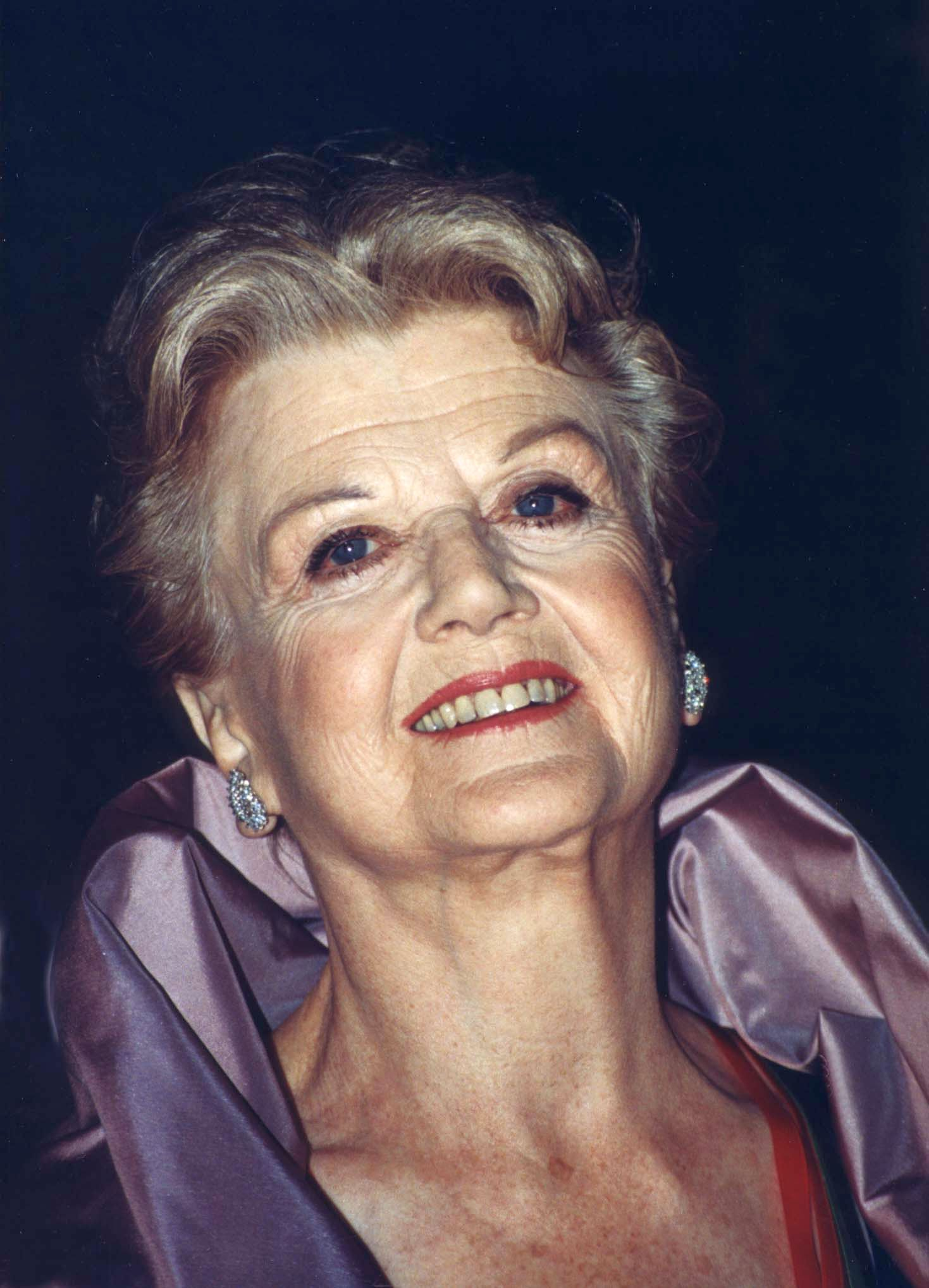
Lansbury in 2000 at the Kennedy Center in Washington DC

For the show's 12th season, CBS executives moved Murder, She Wrote to Thursdays at 8 pm, opposite NBC's new sitcom, Friends. Lansbury was upset by the move, believing that it ignored the show's core audience. This would prove to be the series' final season. The final episode aired on May 19, 1996, and ended with Lansbury voicing a "Goodbye from Jessica" message. In The Washington Post, Tom Shales suggested that the series had become "partly a victim of commercial television's mad youth mania". There were "vocal protests" at its cancellation from the show's fanbase. At the time, it tied the original Hawaii Five-O as the longest-running detective drama series in history.

Lansbury initially had plans for a Murder, She Wrote television film that would be a musical with a score composed by Jerry Herman; that project did not materialize but resulted in the 1996 television film Mrs. Santa Claus, with Lansbury playing the eponymous character, which proved to be a ratings success. Murder, She Wrote continued through several made-for-television films: South By Southwest in 1997, A Story To Die For in 2000, The Last Free Man in 2001, and The Celtic Riddle in 2003. The role of Fletcher would prove the most successful and prominent of Lansbury's career, and she would later speak critically of attempts to reboot the series with a different actress in the lead.

Throughout the run of Murder, She Wrote, Lansbury had continued appearing in other television films, miniseries and cinema. In 1986, she co-hosted the New York Philharmonic's televised Liberty Weekend tribute to the centenary of the Statue of Liberty with Kirk Douglas. That same year, she appeared as the protagonist's mother in Rage of Angels: The Story Continues, and in 1988 portrayed Nan Moore – the mother of a victim of the real-life Korean Air Lines Flight 007 plane crash – in Shootdown. 1989 saw her featured in The Shell Seekers as an Englishwoman recuperating from a heart attack, and in 1990 she starred in The Love She Sought as an American school teacher who falls in love with a Catholic priest while visiting Ireland; Lansbury thought it "a marvelous woman's story." She next starred as the eponymous cockney in a television film adaptation of the novel Mrs 'Arris Goes to Paris, directed by her son and executive produced by her stepson. Lansbury's highest profile cinematic role since The Manchurian Candidate was as the voice of the singing teapot Mrs. Potts in the 1991 Disney animation Beauty and the Beast, as part of which she performed the film's title song. She considered the appearance to be a gift for her three grandchildren. Lansbury again lent her voice to an animated character, this time that of the Empress Dowager, for the 1997 film Anastasia.

Lansbury's Murder, She Wrote fame resulted in her being employed to appear in advertisements and infomercials for Bufferin, MasterCard and the Beatrix Potter Company. In 1988, she released a VHS video titled Angela Lansbury's Positive Moves: My Personal Plan for Fitness and Well-Being, in which she outlined her personal exercise routine, and in 1990 published a book with the same title co-written with Mimi Avins, which she dedicated to her mother. As a result of her work, she was awarded a CBE by the British government, given to her in a ceremony by Charles, Prince of Wales, at the British consulate in Los Angeles. While living for most of the year in California, Lansbury spent the Christmas period and the summer at Corymore House, a farmhouse overlooking the Celtic Sea at Ballywilliam, south of Cloyne in County Cork, which she had had built as a family home in 1991.

=== Final years: 2003–2022 ===
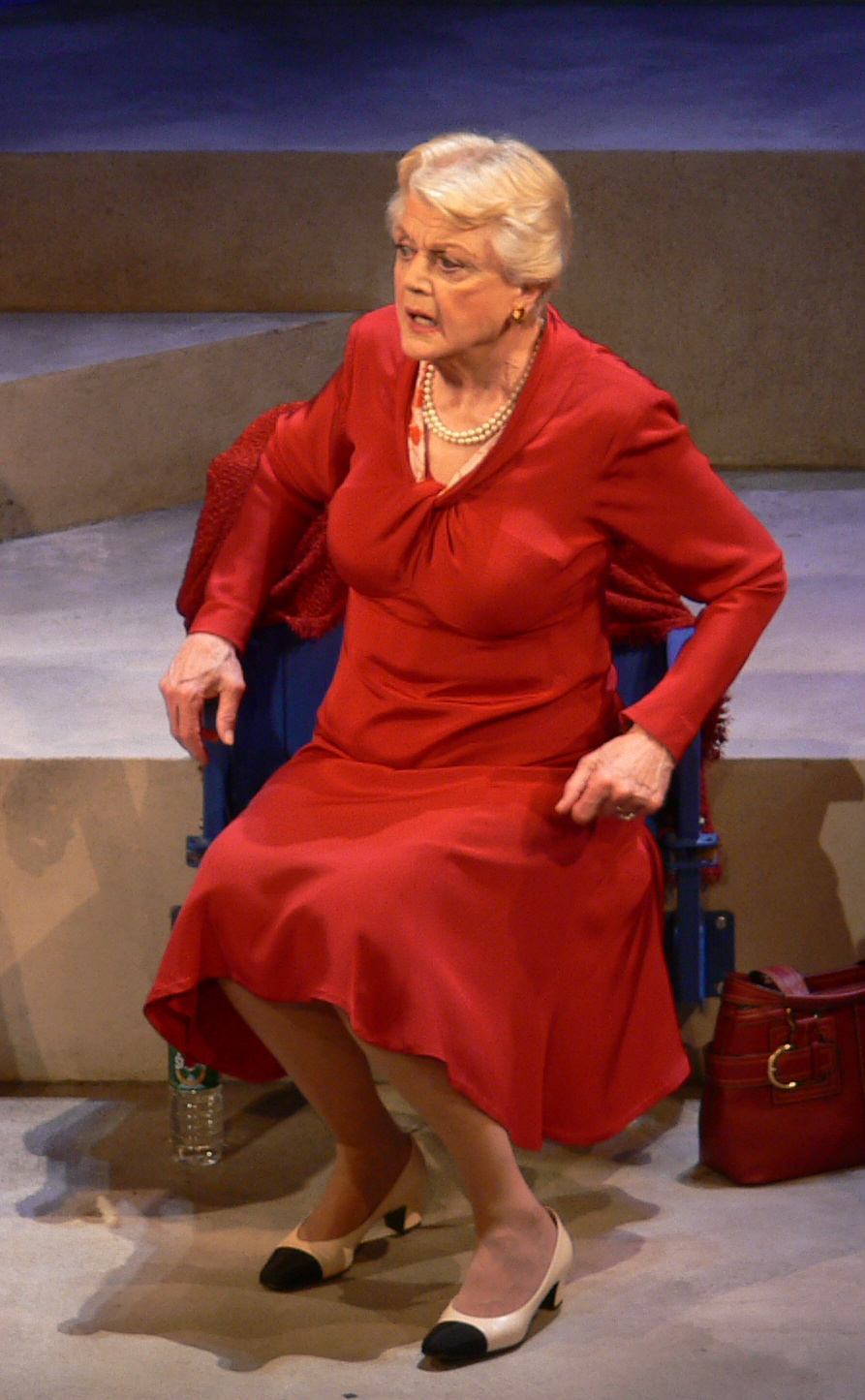
Lansbury performing in Deuce on Broadway in 2007

In the years following Murder, She Wrote, Lansbury was increasingly preoccupied by her husband's deteriorating health; it was for this reason that she dropped out of being the lead role in the 2001 Kander and Ebb musical The Visit before it opened. Peter died in January 2003 of congestive heart failure at the couple's Brentwood home. Lansbury felt that after this she would not take on any more major acting roles, perhaps only making cameo appearances. Wanting to spend more time in New York City, in 2006 she purchased a $2 million condominium in Manhattan.

Lansbury appeared in a season six episode of the television show Law & Order: Special Victims Unit, for which she was nominated for an Emmy Award in 2005. She also starred in the 2005 film Nanny McPhee as Aunt Adelaide, later informing an interviewer that working on it "pulled me out of the abyss" after her husband's death. Lansbury returned to Broadway after a 23-year absence in Deuce, a play by Terrence McNally that opened at the Music Box Theatre in May 2007 for an 18-week limited run. Lansbury received a Tony Award nomination for Best Leading Actress in a Play for her role. In March 2009, she returned to Broadway for a revival of Blithe Spirit at the Shubert Theatre, where she took on the role of Madame Arcati. This appearance earned her the Tony Award for Best Featured Actress in a Play; this was her fifth Tony Award, tying her with the previous record holder for the number of Tony Awards, Julie Harris. From December 2009 to June 2010, Lansbury then starred as Madame Armfeldt in a Broadway revival of A Little Night Music at the Walter Kerr Theatre. The role earned her a seventh Tony Award nomination. In May 2010, she was awarded an honorary doctoral degree from Manhattan School of Music. She then appeared in the 2011 film Mr. Popper's Penguins, opposite Jim Carrey.

From March to July 2012, Lansbury appeared as women's rights advocate Sue-Ellen Gamadge in the Broadway revival of Gore Vidal's The Best Man at the Gerald Schoenfeld Theatre. From February to June 2013, she starred alongside James Earl Jones in an Australian tour of Driving Miss Daisy, an appearance that resulted in her pulling out from a scheduled role in Wes Anderson's The Grand Budapest Hotel. In November 2013, she received an Academy Honorary Award for her lifetime achievement at the Governors Awards. In 2014, Lansbury was appointed Dame Commander of the Order of the British Empire by Queen Elizabeth II. From March to June 2014, Lansbury reprised her performance as Madame Arcati in Blithe Spirit at the Gielgud Theatre in London's West End, her first London stage appearance in nearly 40 years. While in London, she made an appearance at the Angela Lansbury Film Festival, a screening of some of her films in Poplar. From December 2014 to March 2015 she joined the tour of Blithe Spirit across North America. In April 2015 she received her first Olivier Award as Best Supporting Actress for her performance as Arcati, and in November 2015 was awarded the Oscar Hammerstein Award for Lifetime Achievement in Musical Theatre.

Lansbury agreed to star as Mrs St Maugham in a Broadway run of Enid Bagnold's 1955 play The Chalk Garden, although she later acknowledged that she no longer had the stamina for eight performances a week. Instead, she appeared in a one-night staged reading of the play at Hunter College in 2017. Her next role was as Aunt March in the BBC miniseries Little Women, screened in December 2017. In 2018, she appeared in the family film Buttons: A Christmas Tale, as well as in the film Mary Poppins Returns; her cameo role as the Balloon Lady involved singing the song "Nowhere To Go But Up". That year also saw the release of animated film The Grinch, for which Lansbury voiced the Mayor of Whoville. In November 2019, she returned to Broadway, portraying Lady Bracknell in a one-night benefit staging of Wilde's The Importance of Being Earnest for Roundabout Theatre Company's American Airlines Theatre. Lansbury made her final film appearance, a cameo role as herself, in the 2022 film Glass Onion: A Knives Out Mystery.

== Personal life ==
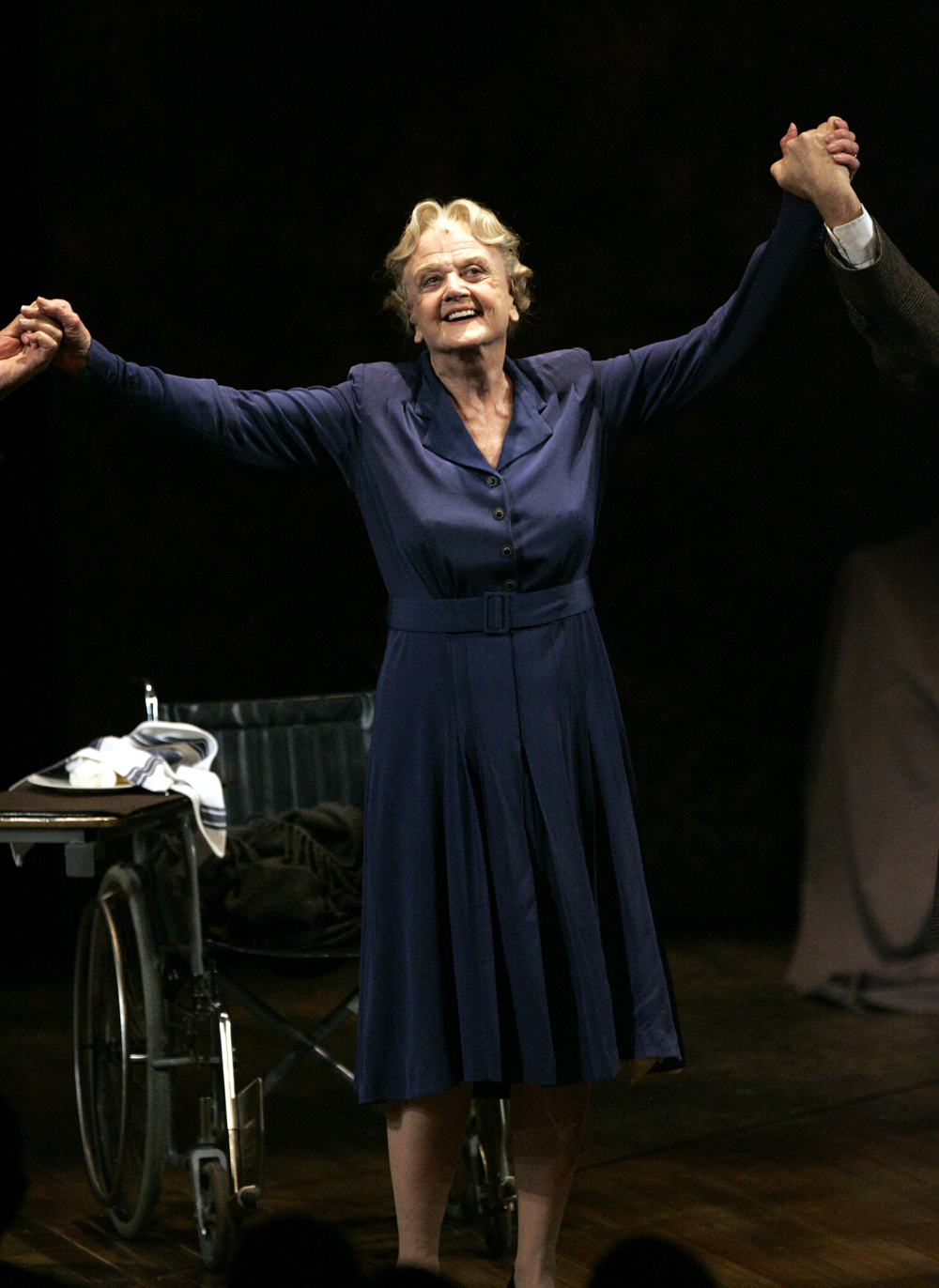
Lansbury on stage in Driving Miss Daisy in 2013

=== Marriages and family ===
Lansbury defined herself as being "Irish-British". She became a US citizen in 1951, while retaining British citizenship. According to a 2014 article in the Irish Independent, she also held Irish citizenship. Although adopting an Americanized accent for roles like that of Jessica Fletcher, Lansbury retained an English accent throughout her life.

Lansbury was a profoundly private person, and disliked attempts at flattery. Gottfried characterized her as being "Meticulous. Cautious. Self-editing. Deliberate. It is what the British call reserved". In The Daily Telegraph, the theatre critic Dominic Cavendish stated that Lansbury's hallmarks were "self-composure, commitment and, yes, gentility", approaches he thought had become "in too short supply" in modern times. Gottfried also commented that she was "as concerned, as sensitive, and as sympathetic as anyone might want in a friend".

Lansbury was married twice. Her first marriage was in 1945 to actor Richard Cromwell, who was 16 years older than she. They divorced in 1946 after Cromwell came out as gay. In 1949, Lansbury married actor and producer Peter Shaw, and they remained married until he died in 2003. They had two children together and Lansbury became the stepmother of Shaw's son from his first marriage. While Lansbury repeatedly stated that she wanted to put her children before her career, she admitted that she frequently had to leave them in California for long periods when she was working elsewhere. In the 1970s, Lansbury moved the family to Ireland. In contemporary newspaper interviews, Lansbury stated the move was because of her children's use of drugs, her daughter's involvement with Charles Manson, and a desire to remove them from that environment.

Lansbury's son directed 68 episodes of Murder, She Wrote. She had three grandchildren and five great-grandchildren at the time of her death in 2022. Lansbury was a cousin of the Postgate family, including the animator and activist Oliver Postgate. She was also a cousin of the novelist Coral Lansbury.

=== Interests and beliefs ===
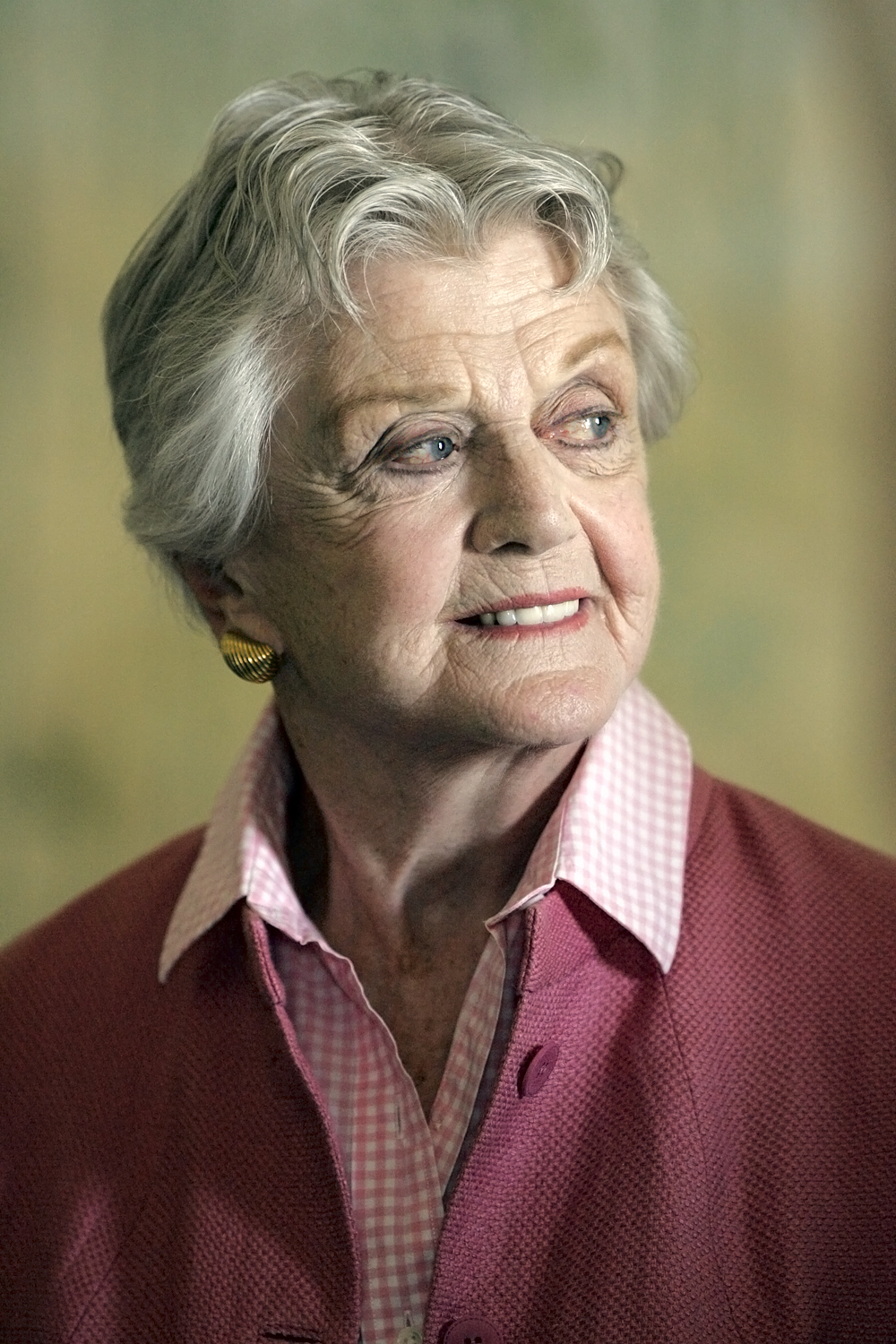
Lansbury in 2013

As a young actress, Lansbury was a self-professed homebody, who commented that she loved housekeeping. She preferred to spend quiet evenings with her friends inside her house because she did not like to engage in Hollywood nightlife. Her hobbies at the time included reading, riding, playing tennis, cooking, and playing the piano; she also had a keen interest in gardening. She cited F. Scott Fitzgerald as her favourite author, and Roseanne and Seinfeld among her favourite television shows. Lansbury was an avid letter writer who wrote letters by hand and made copies of all of them. At Howard Gotlieb's request, Lansbury's papers are housed at the Howard Gotlieb Archival Research Center at Boston University.

Lansbury brought up her children as Episcopalians, but they were not members of a congregation. She stated, "I believe that God is within all of us, that we are perfect, precious beings, and that we have to put our faith and trust in that." She supported the Labour Party in the UK, to which she had family ties, and the Democratic Party in the US; she described herself as a "Democrat from the ground up" to quash rumours that she endorsed the Republican Party. She also supported various charities, particularly those combating domestic abuse and rehabilitating drug users. In the 1980s, she also supported charities combating HIV/AIDS.

=== Health problems ===
Lansbury was a chain smoker in early life, but quit smoking in the mid-1960s. In 1976 and 1987, she underwent cosmetic surgery on her neck. During the 1990s, she began to suffer from arthritis. Lansbury underwent hip replacement surgery in May 1994, followed by knee replacement surgery in 2005.

=== Death ===
Lansbury died in her sleep at her home in the Brentwood neighborhood of Los Angeles, on 11 October 2022, at the age of 96, five days before her 97th birthday.

== Acting credits and accolades ==
In a career stretching from ingénue to dowager, from elegant heroine to depraved villainess, [Lansbury] has displayed durability and flexibility, as well as a highly admired work ethic.

— The Oxford Companion to Theatre and Performance, 2010

In the 1960s, The New York Times referred to Lansbury as the "First Lady of Musical Theatre". She described herself as an actress who also could sing, although in her early film appearances her singing was repeatedly dubbed; Sondheim stated that she had a strong voice, albeit with a limited range. In The Oxford Companion to the American Musical, Thomas Hischak related that Lansbury was "more a character actress than a leading lady" for much of her career, one who brought "a sparkling stage presence to her work". Gottfried described her as "an American icon", while the BBC characterized her as "one of Britain's favourite exports," and The Independent suggested that she could be considered Britain's most successful actress. In The Guardian, journalist Mark Lawson described her as a member of the "acting aristocracy in three countries" – Britain, Ireland, and the United States.

Gottfried noted that Lansbury's public image was "practically saintly". A 2007 interviewer for The New York Times described her as "one of the few actors it makes sense to call beloved", noting that a 1994 article in People magazine awarded her a perfect score on its "lovability index". The New Statesman commented that she "has the kind of pulling power many younger and more ubiquitous actors can only dream of." Lansbury was a gay icon. She described herself as being "very proud of the fact", attributing her popularity among gay people to her performance in Mame; an article in The Philadelphia Inquirer suggested that Murder, She Wrote had further broadened her appeal with that demographic.

Following the announcement of Lansbury's death, many figures in the entertainment industry praised her on social media. The actor Jason Alexander called her "one of the most versatile, talented, graceful, kind, witty, wise, classy ladies" he had ever met. Actor Uzo Aduba called her an "icon of the stage", while actor Josh Gad noted that it was rare that "one person can touch multiple generations, creating a breadth of work that defines decade after decade. Angela Lansbury was that artist". Screenwriter and actor Mark Gatiss praised Lansbury as "the very definition of a pro," while Douglas C. Baker, the producing director for Center Theatre Group, stated that "Angela was a titan of show business, but at the same time she was one of the most kind and approachable people you would ever meet [...] Impeccably professional, genuine and deeply hilarious." Former Walt Disney Studios CEO Robert Iger described her "a consummate professional, a talented actress, and a lovely person." Others who posted in remembrance of Lansbury included Kristin Chenoweth, Viola Davis, Jesse Tyler Ferguson, Harvey Fierstein, Kathy Griffin, Jeremy O. Harris, Brent Spiner, George Takei, and Rachel Zegler. On 12 October, theatres across the West End of London, dimmed their lights for two minutes to mark Lansbury's passing.

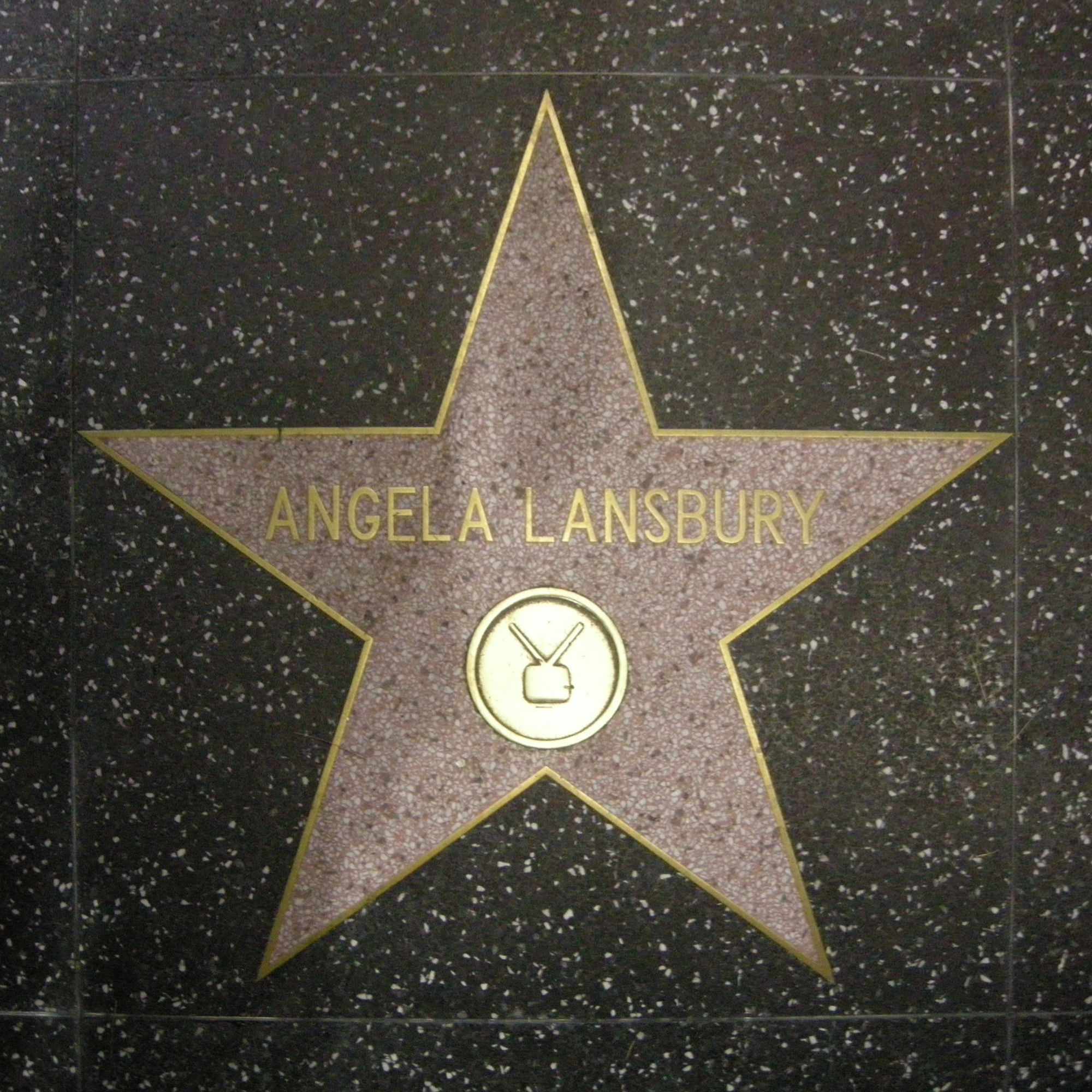
Lansbury's star on the Hollywood Walk of Fame in Los Angeles

Lansbury was recognised for her achievements in Britain on multiple occasions. In 2002, the British Academy of Film and Television Arts (BAFTA) gave her a Lifetime Achievement Award. She was appointed Commander of the Order of the British Empire (CBE) in the 1994 Birthday Honours, and subsequently was made a Dame Commander of the Order of the British Empire (DBE) in the 2014 New Year Honours for services to drama, charitable work, and philanthropy. On being made a dame by Queen Elizabeth II at Windsor Castle, Lansbury stated: "I'm joining a marvellous group of women I greatly admire like Judi Dench and Maggie Smith. It's a lovely thing to be given that nod of approval by your own country and I cherish it."

Lansbury won six Golden Globe Awards and a People's Choice Award for her television and film work. She never won an Emmy Award despite 18 nominations. As of 2009, she held the record for the most unsuccessful Emmy nominations by a performer. She was nominated three times for the Academy Award for Best Supporting Actress, but never won. Reflecting on this in 2007, she stated that she was at first "terribly disappointed, but subsequently very glad that [she] did not win" because she believed that she would have otherwise had a less successful career.

In 2013, the Academy of Motion Picture Arts and Sciences Board of Governors voted to bestow upon Lansbury an Honorary Academy Award for her lifetime achievements in the industry. The actors Emma Thompson and Geoffrey Rush offered tributes at the Governors Awards where the ceremony was held, and Robert Osborne of Turner Classic Movies presented her with the Oscar, stating that "Angela has been adding class, talent, beauty, and intelligence to the movies" since 1944. The Oscar statue is inscribed: "To Angela Lansbury, an icon who has created some of cinema's most memorable characters inspiring generations of actors".

== Publications ==
- Lansbury, Angela; Avins, Mimi (1990). Angela Lansbury's Positive Moves: My Personal Plan for Fitness and Well-Being. New York: Delacorte Press. ISBN 978-0-385-30223-4.

== See also ==
- List of American film actresses
- List of American television actresses
- List of British actors
- List of people from Hampstead
- List of people from Los Angeles
- List of people from Malibu, California
- List of people from New York City
- List of people from the London Borough of Tower Hamlets
- List of women writers
- List of British Academy Award nominees and winners
- List of actors with Academy Award nominations
- List of actors with two or more Academy Award nominations in acting categories
