= Corymore Productions =

American television production company

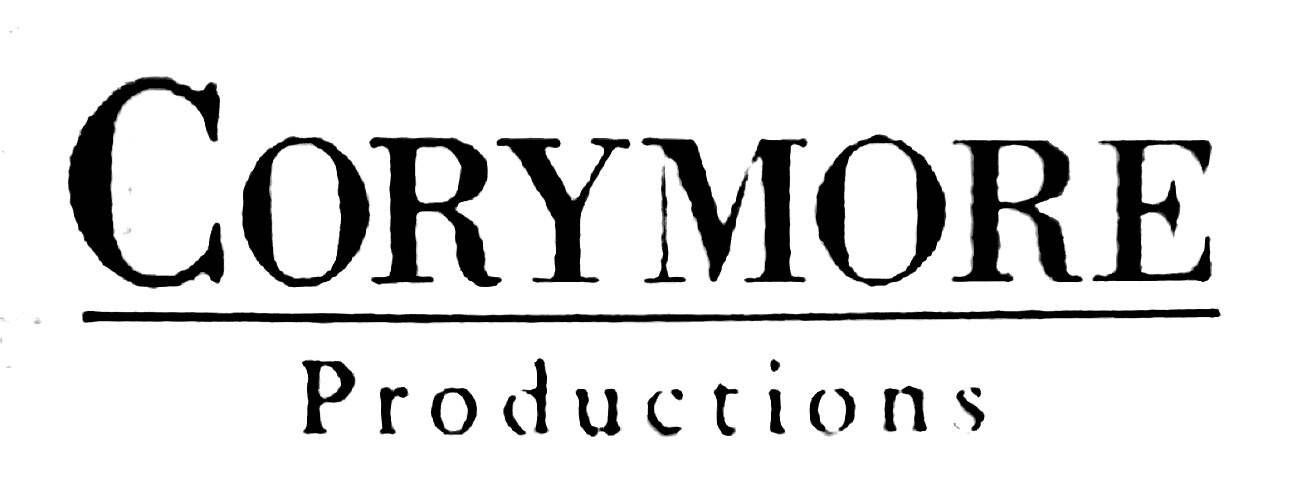
- Company type: Private
- Industry: Television production company
- Founded: 1987; 39 years ago
- Founder: Peter Shaw; Angela Lansbury
- Fate: Dormant
- Headquarters: Universal City, California, United States
- Key people: David Shaw, Anthony Shaw, Angela Lansbury
- Number of employees: 10–19

Corymore Productions is an American television production company that was created and founded in 1987 by producer Peter Shaw and his wife and actress Angela Lansbury. The name came from Corrymore House, by Keem Bay on Achill Island in Ireland, where Lansbury had spent childhood summer holidays, and whose correct spelling with doubled R she discovered later.

The couple launched Corymore Productions at Universal Studios with their two sons, David and Anthony, where for twelve years they co-produced the long-running hit television series Murder, She Wrote, as well as several television movies featuring Lansbury. The company, which produced Murder, She Wrote: The Celtic Riddle, hasn't produced anything since 2003.

== TV productions ==
- Murder, She Wrote (1984–1996) (produced by Corymore from 1992 to 1996)
- Mrs. 'Arris Goes to Paris (1992)
- Mrs. Santa Claus (1996)
- Murder, She Wrote: South by Southwest (1997)
- The Unexpected Mrs. Pollifax (1999)
- Murder, She Wrote: A Story to Die For (2000)
- Murder, She Wrote: The Last Free Man (2001)
- Murder, She Wrote: The Celtic Riddle (2003)
