= Peter Shaw (producer, born 1918) =

British film actor and producer (1918–2003)

- Shaw in 1939
- Born: Peter Pullen; 24 June 1918; Reading, Berkshire, England
- Died: 29 January 2003 (aged 84); Los Angeles, California, U.S.
- Occupations: Actor, producer
- Years active: 1934–1997
- Spouse: Angela Lansbury (m. 1949)
- Children: 3

Peter Shaw (né Pullen; 24 June 1918 – 29 January 2003) was an English actor and producer. Shaw was the second husband of actress Angela Lansbury.

== Early life and career ==
Shaw was born on 24 June 1918 in Reading, Berkshire, England, and began his career in front of the screen following the Second World War, and later found success as a studio executive. Shaw served in the British Army during the Second World War. He was signed to a contract with Metro-Goldwyn-Mayer by the Charles Feldman Agency in the late 1940s. Shaw apprenticed with agent Paul Small, leading to an executive position at the studio and later a career with the William Morris Agency, where he represented Katharine Hepburn and Robert Mitchum, among others. He returned to MGM as assistant head of production in 1964 and then rejoined the William Morris Agency as an international business manager. Shaw launched Corymore Productions in 1987. He later produced Murder, She Wrote with his two sons at Universal Studios, starring his wife Angela Lansbury, in addition to other made-for-television features.

== Personal life and death ==
After an early marriage that produced a son, David, he married actress Angela Lansbury in 1949; they had two children, Anthony Pullen Shaw (born 7 January 1952) and Deirdre Angela Shaw (born 26 April 1953).

Shaw died of heart failure in his Los Angeles home on 29 January 2003. He was 84. He was honoured with an In Memory note in Murder, She Wrote: The Celtic Riddle in the closing credits.

== Filmography ==
=== Acting ===
Year	Title	Role	Notes	ref
1939	Sons of the Sea	Lt. John Strepte	British colour drama film directed by Maurice Elvey	
1947	Forever Amber	Deacon	American romantic drama film directed by Otto Preminger; Uncredited	
1947	The Exile	Higson	American Adventure romantic drama film in Technicolor directed by Max Ophüls	
