= Lee Miller (actor) =

American film and television actor

- Miller in Perry Mason, 1964
- Born: Harlan Leroy Miller; March 21, 1918; Hollywood, California, U.S.
- Died: July 26, 2002 (aged 84)
- Occupations: Film and television actor

Harlan Leroy Miller (March 21, 1918 – July 26, 2002) was an American film and television actor. He was best known for playing the recurring role of Sgt. Brice in the American legal drama television series Perry Mason.

Miller guest-starred in television programs including The Virginian, Ironside, Mannix, Fantasy Island, The Bob Cummings Show, and Peter Gunn. He also appeared in numerous films such as A Fistful of Dollars, The Man Who Knew Too Much, Kelly's Heroes, Experiment Alcatraz, Please Murder Me!, The Big Clock, The Damned Don't Cry, My Friend Irma Goes West, Meet Danny Wilson, Raiders of the Seven Seas and The Court Jester.

Miller died on July 26, 2002, at the age of 84.
