= Please Murder Me! =

1956 film by Peter Godfrey

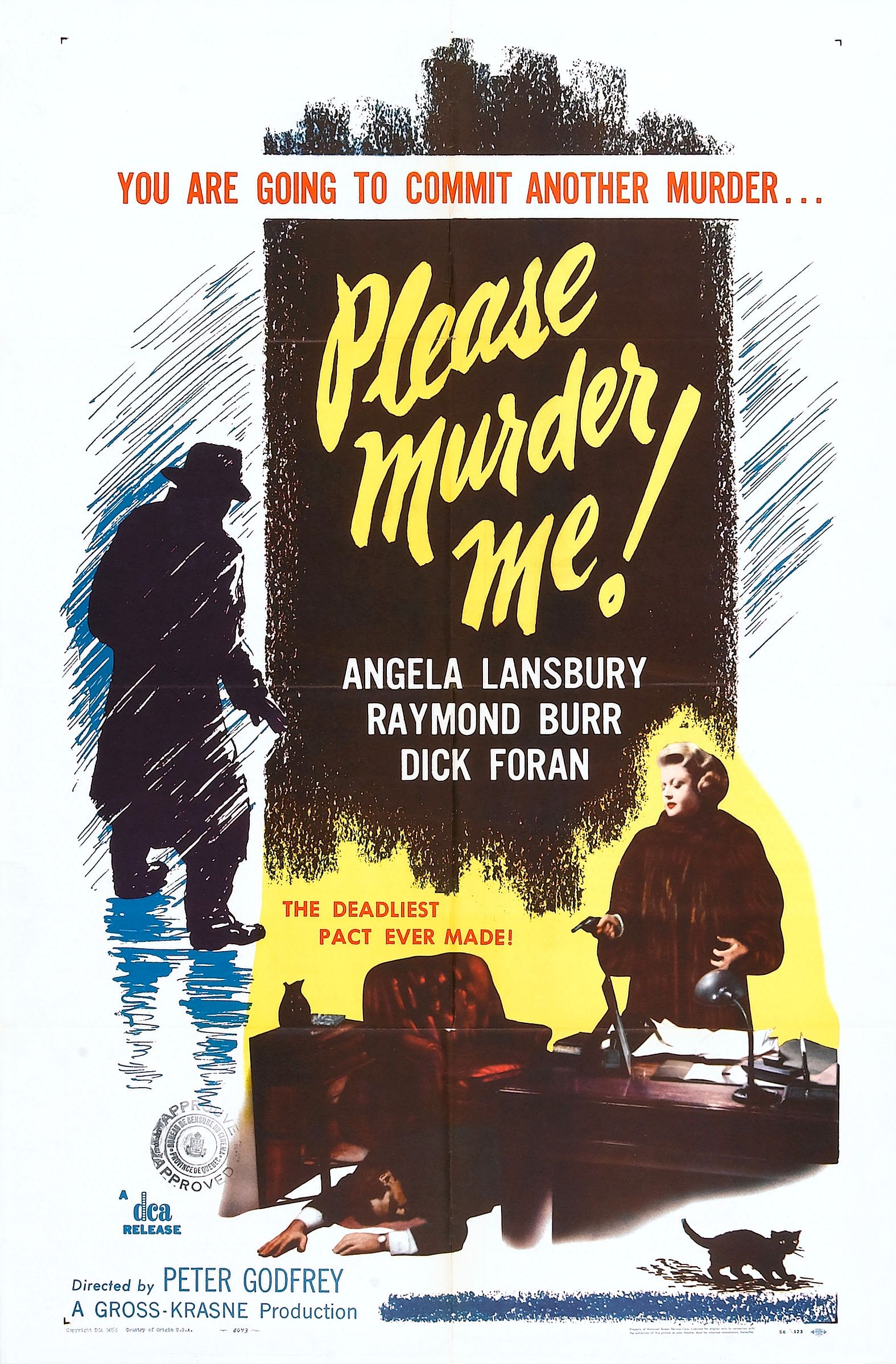
- Theatrical release poster
- Directed by: Peter Godfrey
- Screenplay by: Donald Hyde; Al C. Ward
- Story by: David T. Chantler; Ewald André Dupont
- Produced by: Donald Hyde
- Starring: Angela Lansbury; Raymond Burr
- Cinematography: Alan Stensvold
- Edited by: Kenneth G. Crane
- Music by: Albert Glasser
- Distributed by: Distributors Corporation of America
- Release date: March 1, 1956 (U.S.)
- Running time: 78 minutes
- Country: United States
- Language: English

Please Murder Me! is a 1956 American film noir directed by Peter Godfrey and starring Angela Lansbury, Raymond Burr and Dick Foran. The film contains an incomplete copyright notice omitting mention of its claimant and has fallen into the public domain. It was Godfrey's final film before his death in 1970.

== Plot ==
Defense lawyer Craig Carlson buys a pistol at a pawn shop and deposits it in his office desk drawer with a file folder. He dictates a message into a tape recorder for district attorney Ray Willis, revealing that he expects to be murdered within an hour, and he begins to tell his story in extended flashbacks.

The memories begin with Craig's explanation to his friend Joe Leeds that he is having an affair with Leeds' wife Myra, who wants a divorce. Joe asks Craig to allow him time to consider the matter. Days later at his office, Joe finishes writing a letter and gives it to his business partner Lou Kazarian to mail. Joe phones Myra telling her that he will be home soon to discuss something. There, he confronts Myra in their bedroom, where a door is closed and a gunshot is heard. Police investigate Joe's death. Myra explains that Joe became irate and threatened her physically, forcing her to shoot him in self-defense. Craig is also on the scene, having arrived before the police and acting as Myra's lawyer.

In the ensuing trial, Willis allows the police to present their evidence that a physical struggle did not occur as she had claimed. Willis notes that Myra was unemployed when she first met Joe, a successful businessman with substantial life insurance. In her defense, Craig attributes Myra's inconsistencies regarding the night in question to post-traumatic hysteria. In his closing argument, Craig claims that the financial motive in Willis's case is invalid because Myra was in love with another man—a revelation that could inspire Joe to cause Myra premeditated harm. Craig then reveals that he himself is Myra's lover.

The jury finds Myra not guilty. She and Craig throw a party to celebrate with friends, and while celebrating they discuss their plans to marry and travel to Europe on their honeymoon.

Lou Kazarian arrives and reveals privately to Craig that he had forgotten to mail Joe's letter, which was addressed to Craig. Joe discloses in the letter that Myra did indeed marry him for his money, but that she was actually in love with an artist, not with Craig. Joe had decided to ask her to stay married, in part to save Craig from her. Craig then remembers Myra mentioning that an "old friend," an artist named Carl Holt, had visited her in jail during the trial.

Craig visits Holt, who explains his long relationship with Myra, interrupted by her marriage to Joe, and states his gratitude and admiration for Craig in his defense work in Myra's trial, especially for posing as Myra's lover as a tactic. Craig later confronts Myra with Joe's letter and his talk with Holt. She admits that she intends to continue on with Holt now that she is free.

Accusing her of costing him his best friend, the love of his life and his profession all at once, Craig tells Myra that she will pay for her crime because he will force her to murder him. Myra is incredulous, but Craig soon puts a plan in motion and develops a friendship with Holt, even employing him to paint a portrait to delay Myra and Holt's departure to Europe to marry. Craig taunts Myra that he will reveal all of the evidence to Holt and let him decide if he wishes to marry a murderer. Craig meets socially with Willis, discussing Myra's case, and lets Myra see them together.

Craig concludes his story that he has dictated into the tape recorder by saying that he has arranged to meet Myra at the office at 12:30 am. Hearing a knock at the office door, Craig leaves the recorder running and hides the microphone before admitting Myra. He shows her the file that he claims is full of evidence that he has compiled against her, and he then rests the pistol on the desk. He starts to make a phone call to Holt. Myra, driven to desperation, takes the gun and shoots Craig, who falls to the floor. Using a handkerchief, she hangs up the phone and wipes her fingerprints from the gun, which she puts in Craig's hand. She finds that the file contains only blank sheets of paper. When Willis arrives, she explains that Craig has shot himself. After checking that Craig is in fact dead, Willis learns that Myra had an appointment with Craig for 12:30, then tells her that Craig had invited him to come at 12:40. He finds the microphone and recorder and then stops and rewinds the tape. As he begins to play Craig's recording, Myra starts crying, defeated.

== Cast ==
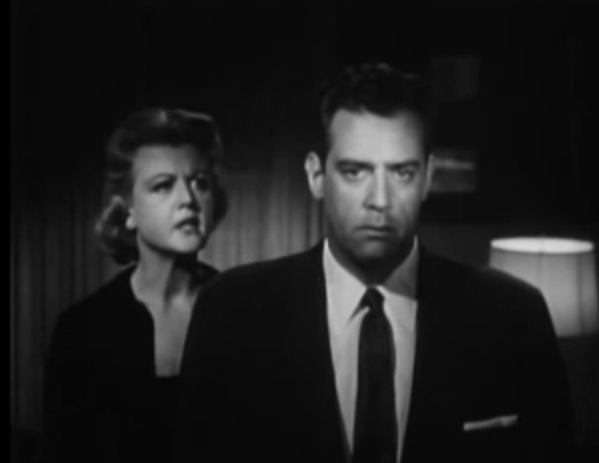
Angela Lansbury and Raymond Burr

- Angela Lansbury as Myra Leeds
- Raymond Burr as Attorney Craig Carlson
- Dick Foran as Joe Leeds
- John Dehner as District Attorney Ray Willis
- Lamont Johnson as Carl Holt
- Robert Griffin as Lou Kazarian
- Denver Pyle as Detective Lieutenant Bradley
- Russ Thorson as Judge
- Lee Miller as Patrolman

== See also ==
- List of American films of 1956
- List of films in the public domain in the United States
