= Deuce (play) =

2007 play by Terrence McNally

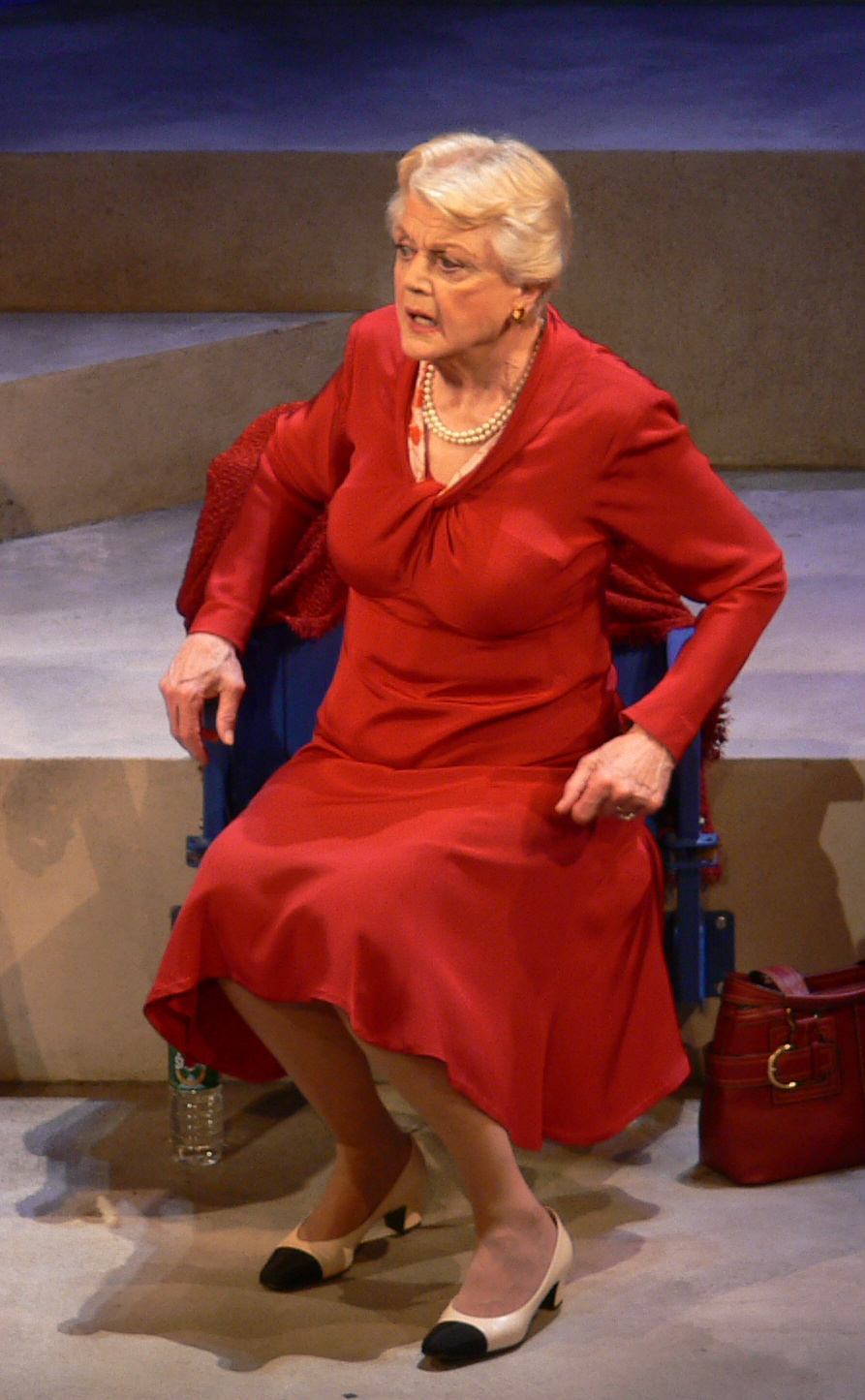
- Angela Lansbury as Leona Mullen in 'Deuce'
- Original language: English
- Written by: Terrence McNally
- Characters: Leona Mullen; Midge Barker; Kelly Short; Ryan Becker; An Admirer
- Setting: USTA National Tennis Center in Flushing Meadows–Corona Park

Premiere
- Date: May 6, 2007
- Place: Music Box Theatre
- Official website

Deuce is a play by Terrence McNally which ran on Broadway in 2007.

== Productions ==
Deuce began previews on Broadway at the Music Box Theatre on April 11, 2007, and opened on May 6. It ended its limited run on August 19, 2007, after 27 previews and 121 performances.

The play was directed by Michael Blakemore and starred Angela Lansbury as blue collar Leona Mullen and Marian Seldes as well-bred Midge Barker. It featured Joanna P. Adler (Kelly Short), Brian Haley (Ryan Becker), and Michael Mulheren (An Admirer).

The play was produced by Scott Rudin, The Shubert Organization, Roger Berlind, Stuart Thompson, Maberry Theatricals, Debra Black, Bob Boyett, Susan Dietz, and Daryl Roth. Scenic Design was by Peter J. Davison, Costume Design was by Ann Roth, Lighting Design by Mark Henderson and Sound Design by Paul Charlier.

The production marked Lansbury's first time on the Broadway stage since her performance in the 1983 revival of Mame. She was nominated for the Tony Award for Best Performance by a Leading Actress in a Play but lost to Julie White for The Little Dog Laughed.

== Synopsis ==
Two former successful tennis partners, now retired, reunite to be honored at a women's quarterfinals match at the US Open. As the two women watch the match, they reminisce about athletes including Althea Gibson and Babe Didrikson Zaharias and complain about the lack of form and scanty dress of the players, while commentators Kelly Short and Ryan Becker share patter, and a starstruck middle-aged fan offers soliloquies about his idols.

== Critical reception ==
In his review in The New York Times, Ben Brantley called the play a "flimsy excuse for a comedy" and "a grab bag of synthetic scraps of sentimental truisms and grumpy-old-broad humor." He added, "[Angela Lansbury] is so vitally and indelibly present that she even occasionally gives flesh to a play as wispy as ectoplasm . . . [she] comes close to creating something like a fully woven character out of the random threads she has been given."

Eric Grode of The New York Sun described the play as a "moldy new comedy . . . [that] has stumbled onto Broadway with the grace of a John McEnroe temper tantrum. This dispiriting waste of talent and time exists solely to let two grandes dames of the theater . . . engage in the sort of banter and bathos that went out of style with The Gin Game . . . That these exchanges generate even a tiny handful of laughs has everything to do with the formidable pair of actresses and virtually nothing to do with Mr. McNally or director Michael Blakemore, who appears to have staged the play when he had a few hours to kill one afternoon."

The CurtainUp reviewer wrote: "Lansbury and Seldes are incapable of giving anything but master class performances, but, alas, Terrence McNally has written them a wilted bouquet of a play that validates the old poker expression 'Deuce always loses.'... Mr. McNally has peppered his script with a smidgen [sic] of the at-once funny and touching dialogue he's known for, and the charismatic actresses land every line in keeping with their stage personalities—Lansbury's Lorena is wry and a tad raunchy, Seldes' Park Avenue raised Midge is prim but hardly stuffy."
