= Something for Everyone =

1970 American black comedy film

- Original theatrical poster
- Directed by: Harold Prince
- Screenplay by: Hugh Wheeler
- Based on: The Cook by Harry Kressing
- Produced by: John Flaxman
- Starring: Angela Lansbury; Michael York; Anthony Higgins; Jane Carr; Heidelinde Weis
- Cinematography: Walter Lassally
- Edited by: Ralph Rosenblum
- Music by: John Kander
- Production company: Cinema Center Films
- Distributed by: National General Pictures
- Release date: July 22, 1970
- Running time: 112 minutes
- Country: United States
- Language: English

Something for Everyone is a 1970 American black comedy film starring Angela Lansbury, Michael York, Anthony Higgins, and Jane Carr. Directed by Harold Prince (in his feature directorial debut), with a screenplay by Hugh Wheeler, the plot differs significantly from the source material, the Harry Kressing novel The Cook. Lansbury was nominated for the Golden Globe Award for Best Actress – Motion Picture Musical or Comedy.

Production for Cinema Center Films began in June 1969, first released by National General Pictures in July 1970. The film's UK release in May 1971 was retitled Black Flowers for the Bride, subtitled A Comedy of Evil.

== Plot ==
Handsome young stranger Konrad Ludwig is bicycling through the Bavarian Alps when he stops to admire Castle Ornstein, the property of widowed Countess Herthe von Ornstein, who lives in the dower house and is financially unable to maintain the castle itself. Konrad, who dreams of living in a castle, sets out to integrate himself into the von Ornstein household. At the local beer garden, he becomes acquainted with Rudolph, the countess's footman. After Konrad removes a splinter from Rudolph's hand, the grateful footman offers to find Konrad work with the countess and takes him to the castle, where Konrad is told that there are no openings at the moment.

That night at the opera, Konrad flirts with Anneliese Pleschke, the young and beautiful daughter of nouveau riche American tourists. After "accidentally" injuring the Pleschkes' chauffeur's hand, Konrad offers to replace him the next day. As Konrad chauffeurs the Pleschkes around the countryside, he tells them that Castle Ornstein is vacant, plotting to use the Pleschkes' wealth to reopen the castle, and Anneliese's parents instanly become interested. That night, after getting Rudolph drunk at the beer garden, Konrad pushes him in front of a train on the way home, killing him.

The following day, the countess hires Konrad as Rudolph's replacement, while he begins a romance with Anneliese. The countess has two teenage children: Helmuth, a shy and attractive young man, and Lotte, a plain-looking, intrusive and obnoxious girl. Konrad seduces Helmuth, but they are observed by the stern majordomo, Klaus, who fires Konrad. Konrad reports Klaus to the mayor of Ornstein, who is determined to eradicate all Nazis remaining in Germany, after discovering Klaus's dark secret: his father was a Nazi colonel, whose memory is fondly enshrined in Klaus's bedroom. Klaus is quietly exiled from town, and Konrad replaces him as majordomo.

Since Castle Ornstein is held under an entail and can only be owned by the family, Konrad persuades the countess to host a lavish garden party in order to arrange a marriage between Helmuth and Anneliese. Konrad, the lover of both Helmuth and Anneliese, induces them to become engaged to each other, while secretly assuring each of them that he would always be there for them at the castle. Once the marriage contract is signed, the Pleschke money flows in to reopen and refurbish Castle Ornstein.

Shortly after the wedding, the honeymoon is a disaster, leaving both bride and groom desperately wanting an annulment. To make matters worse, Anneliese walks in on Konrad and Helmuth kissing. Shocked and speechless, Anneliese is ushered to the limousine in which she and her parents are to be driven to the castle by Konrad. When Anneliese hysterically reveals the truth to her parents, Konrad drives the limousine down a steep embankment, jumping out before it crashes, killing Anneliese and her parents. Konrad escapes with a broken leg.

Konrad recovers from his injuries and eventually spends a night of passion with the countess in her boudoir. When Konrad and the countess announce their plans to marry, Helmuth is devastated, but reluctantly accepts their union, not wanting to lose Konrad entirely. However, on the eve of the wedding, Lotte privately informs Konrad that she knows all about his intrigues, manipulations, and murderous exploits, as she has been observing him. She uses blackmail to avoid being Konrad's next victim and have him marry her instead of her mother.

== Cast ==
- Angela Lansbury as Countess Herthe von Ornstein
- Michael York as Konrad Ludwig
- Anthony Higgins (credited as Anthony Corlan) as Helmuth von Ornstein
- Heidelinde Weis as Anneliese Pleschke
- Jane Carr as Lotte von Ornstein
- Eva Maria Meineke as Frau Pleschke
- John Gill as Herr Pleschke
- Wolfried Lier as Klaus
- Klaus Havenstein as Rudolph
- Walter Janssen as Father Georg
- Despo Diamantidou (credited as Despo) as Bobby

== Reception ==
In a contemporary review, critic Charles Champlin of the Los Angeles Times called the film an "essentially empty charade" and wrote: "In a diversion like this it is necessary—if only to engage the viewer's sympathies—to align your evil demon against some person or persons who are at least relatively good. But there's not really anyone to root for in 'Something for Everyone.' Miss Lansbury is rather more innocently corrupt than York, but it's also obvious that she can outwit him any minute she puts her mind to it." Regarding first-time director Harold Prince, Champlin surmised: "Prince set himself an initial assignment which was probably even more imposing than it seemed to be ... But he never defines a unifying intention for the movie—social satire, tense psychological thriller or suspense drama with comedic overtones."

Critic John Simon called Something for Everyone "a thoroughly unsavory film" and decried its immorality and glorification of homosexuality: "I submit that the entire film exemplifies a kind of vengeance on the heterosexual world by a mentality resenting its real or alleged compulsion to disassemble and hide its predilections. In retaliation, anything that the so-called normal world considers healthy and decent—and some of it, so help us, is healthy and decent—is systematically trodden underheel."

Prince felt that Cinema Center butchered the final edit of the film and vowed never to direct a film again without final approval of editing, advertising and distribution.

On its British release as Black Flowers for the Bride, film critic Margaret Hinxman, writing in the Sunday Telegraph, called it “a dazzling compendium of skulduggery” and “a wickedly funny film, richly inventive in selecting the targets (including lingering Nazi fervour) for its humour.”

== Home media ==
VHS releases in 1986 and 1990 were followed by DVD and Blu-ray releases in December 2016.

== See also ==
- List of American films of 1970
