= List of Queen's Counsel in England and Wales appointed in 1953 =

A Queen's Counsel (post-nominal QC), or King's Counsel (post-nominal KC) during the reign of a king, is an eminent lawyer (usually a barrister or advocate) who is appointed by the monarch to be one of "Her Majesty's Counsel learned in the law." The term is recognised as an honorific. Appointments are made from within the legal profession on the basis of merit rather than a particular level of experience. Members have the privilege of sitting within the bar of court. As members wear silk gowns of a particular design (see court dress), appointment as Queen's Counsel is known informally as taking silk, and hence QCs are often colloquially called silks.

The rank emerged in the sixteenth century, but came to prominence over the course of the nineteenth. Appointment was open to barristers only until 1995. The first women KCs had been appointed only in 1949.

== 1953 ==
Name	Inns of Court	University	Notes	Ref
Elliot Marcet Gorst	Inner Temple (1912)	–	Born in 1885, Gorst was educated at Temple Grove School and Harrow School, and in Jena and Paris. Called to the bar in 1912, he served in the First World War between 1915 and 1918. He authored Guide to Railway Rates Tribunal (1927). He was a member of the Bar Council in 1932 and Deputy Judge at Bloomsbury County Court from 1940 to 1942, before sitting on the Bar Council again between 1948 and 1952. Gorst had a short-lived attempt at a political career, contesting the parliamentary seat of Poplar South in 1929 for the Conservatives, and the Poplar South (1925 and 1928) and Bow and Bromley (1931) seats on the London County Council for the Municipal Reform Party; he was unsuccessful on each count. (Note: Gorst's Who Was Who entry states that he contested Bow and Bromley in 1926 and Poplar South in 1928 for the Municipal Reform Party as well as South Poplar for the Conservatives in 1929, all of which is also stated in his obituary in The Times. However, contemporary reports indicate that he contested Poplar South for the LLC in 1925 and 1928, but Bow and Bromley in 1931; the vacancy in 1926 for the latter seat went to Labour and was uncontested.) Gorst farmed in Kent and chaired the Kent and Sussex Poetry Society from 1953. He died in 1973, leaving a wife and daughter.	
Bruce Edgar Dutton Briant				
Claude Henry Duveen, MBE	Middle Temple (1927)	New College, Oxford	Born in 1903, Duveen graduated from Oxford in 1925 with a law degree. His legal practice was interrupted by service in the Royal Air Force Volunteer Reserve during the Second World War. He was appointed Deputy Chairman of the Berkshire Quarter Sessions in 1958, and then served as Chairman between 1966 and 1971. He was also a Circuit Judge from 1958 until his death in 1976. He had been appointed an MBE in 1946.	
Sir John Watt Senter				
Sir Fenton Atkinson, PC				
Sir Reginald William Goff, PC				
Jack Messoud Eric Di Victor Nahum	Inner Temple (1929)	Merton College, Oxford	Nahum was born in 1906, the son of a cereal and esparto grass merchant from Trieste who had settled in Manchester; his twin brother was the photographer "Baron". After Clifton College, he went up to Oxford and graduated in 1927. His legal practice was interrupted by service as an officer in the army during Second World War – in India, the Middle East and Iraq. He died unmarried in 1959.	
Sir John Patrick Graham				
John Frederick Drabble				
Quintin McGarel Hogg, 2nd Viscount Hailsham, KG, CH, PC, FRS				
Richard Haddow Forrest				
Kenneth Robert Hope Johnston	Gray's Inn (1933)	Sidney Sussex College, Cambridge	Born in 1905 to Dr. J. A. H. Johnston, headmaster of Highgate School, Kenneth Johnston graduated from Cambridge in 1927. His practice was interrupted by service in the Royal Air Force Volunteer Reserve during the Second World War. In 1958, he became a bencher of Gray's Inn. He died in 1998.	
Eustace Wentworth Roskill, Baron Roskill, PC				
Sir John Megaw, CBE, TD				
Sir Rudolph Lyons				
Ingram Joseph Lindner	Middle Temple (1935)	Fitzwilliam House, Cambridge	Lindner was born in 1913, the second son of John Lindner, a merchant. After Upton House School, he went up to Cambridge, completing part two of the law tripos in 1934. After being called, he practised at the Chancery bar. He died in 1959.	
Frederick Elwyn Jones, Baron Elwyn-Jones, CH, PC				
