= Poplar South (London County Council constituency) =

London County Council constituency

- Former constituency for the London County Council

Former constituency
- Created: 1919
- Abolished: 1949
- Member(s): 2
- Created from: Poplar
- Replaced by: Poplar

Poplar South was a constituency used for elections to the London County Council between 1919 and 1949. The seat shared boundaries with the UK Parliament constituency of the same name.

== Councillors ==
Year	Name	Party	Name	Party
1919	Susan Lawrence	Labour	Samuel March	Labour
1925	Susan Lawrence	Labour	George William Mills	Labour
1928	Ishbel MacDonald	Labour	George William Mills	Labour
1930	Ishbel MacDonald	Labour	David Morgan Adams	Labour
1931	Ishbel MacDonald	Independent Socialist	David Morgan Adams	Labour
1934	William Henry Guy	Labour	David Morgan Adams	Labour
1937	William Henry Guy	Labour	Frederick Thomas Baldock	Labour

== Election results ==
1919 London County Council election: Poplar South
Party	Candidate	Votes	%	±%
Labour	Samuel March	3,466		
Labour	Susan Lawrence	3,317		
Progressive	Fred Thorne	1,528		
Progressive	John Bussey	1,313		
Majority				
Labour hold		Swing		
Labour gain from Progressive		Swing		

1922 London County Council election: Poplar South
Party	Candidate	Votes	%	±%
Labour	Samuel March	10,716	31.6	
Labour	Susan Lawrence	10,511	31.0	
Municipal Reform	C. R. Ingleby	6,397	18.8	
Municipal Reform	A. Tildesley	6,328	18.6	
Majority		4,114	12.2	
Labour hold		Swing		
Labour hold		Swing		

1925 London County Council election: Poplar South
Party	Candidate	Votes	%	±%
Labour	George William Mills	10,548		
Labour	Susan Lawrence	10,395		
Municipal Reform	N. M. Macbeth	2,124		
Municipal Reform	Elliot Gorst	2,062		
Majority				
Labour hold		Swing		
Labour hold		Swing		

1928 London County Council election: Poplar South
Party	Candidate	Votes	%	±%
Labour	George William Mills	10,694		
Labour	Ishbel MacDonald	10,681		
Liberal	Harold Heathcote-Williams	1,935		
Municipal Reform	E. Macbeth	1,751		
Liberal	Henry Harcourt	1,672		
Municipal Reform	Elliot Marcet Gorst	1,564		
Majority				
Labour hold		Swing		
Labour hold		Swing		

Poplar South by-election, 1930
Party	Candidate	Votes	%	±%
Labour	David Morgan Adams	Unopposed	N/A	N/A
Labour hold		Swing	N/A	

1931 London County Council election: Poplar South
Party	Candidate	Votes	%	±%
Labour	Ishbel MacDonald	8,682		
Labour	David Morgan Adams	8,493		
Ratepayers	E. Macbeth	2,782		
Ratepayers	H. C. Joel	2,657		
Majority				
Labour hold		Swing		
Labour hold		Swing		

1934 London County Council election: Poplar South
Party	Candidate	Votes	%	±%
Labour	David Morgan Adams	8,930		
Labour	William Henry Guy	8,431		
Liberal	J. Boult	1,965		
Liberal	William Ridgway	1,692		
Ind. Labour Party	Jim Hammond	1,003		
Communist	A. Sweetman	498		
Communist	E. J. Wilson	316		
Majority				
Labour hold		Swing		
Labour hold		Swing		

1937 London County Council election: Poplar South
Party	Candidate	Votes	%	±%
Labour	Frederick Thomas Baldock	9,565		
Labour	William Henry Guy	9,552		
Municipal Reform	J. H. Bowron	1,958		
Municipal Reform	C. G. Spencer	1,872		
Majority				
Labour hold		Swing		
Labour hold		Swing		

1946 London County Council election: Poplar South
Party	Candidate	Votes	%	±%
Labour	Frederick Thomas Baldock	Unopposed	N/A	N/A
Labour	William Henry Guy	Unopposed	N/A	N/A
Majority		Unopposed	N/A	N/A
Labour hold		Swing	N/A	
Labour hold		Swing	N/A	
