= Lansbury =

Lansbury is a surname. Notable people with the surname include:

- Angela Lansbury (1925–2022), British-American actress
- Bruce Lansbury (1930–2017), British-American television producer
- Coral Lansbury (1929–1991), Australian author and academic
- Edgar Lansbury (1930–2024), British-born Irish-American theatre, film, and television producer; twin brother of Bruce
- George Lansbury (1859–1940), British politician
- Henri Lansbury (born 1990), English footballer
- Minnie Lansbury (1889–1922), British suffragette

== See also ==
- Lansbury Estate, London, England, United Kingdom, named after George Lansbury
- Lansbury (ward)
- Lansbury Park, Wales, United Kingdom
