= 1942 Poplar South by-election =

UK parliamentary by-election

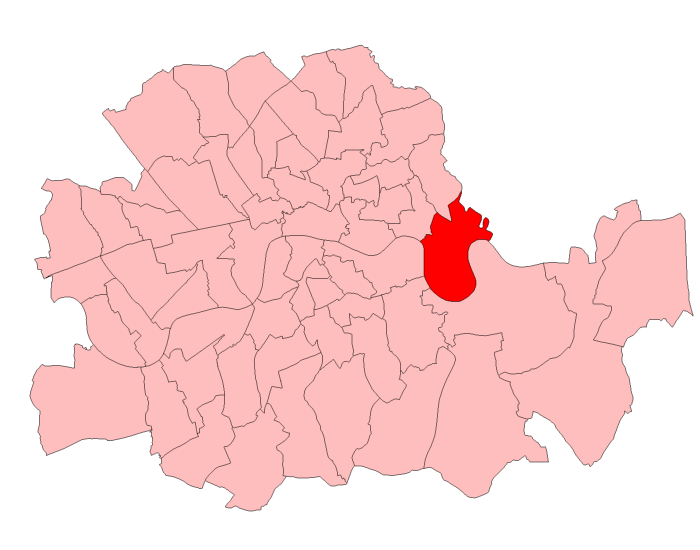
Poplar South in the Parliamentary County of London, showing boundaries used from 1918 to 1950.

The 1942 Poplar South by-election was a by-election held on 12 August 1942 for the British House of Commons constituency of Poplar South, which covered the Isle of Dogs and Poplar in the Metropolitan Borough of Poplar.

== Vacancy ==
The by-election was caused by the death of the constituency's Labour Party Member of Parliament (MP) David Morgan Adams, who had held the seat since the 1931 general election. The result at the last election was;

General election 14 November 1935: Poplar South Electorate
Party	Candidate	Votes	%	±%
Labour	David Morgan Adams	18,715	73.2	+15.6
Conservative	Diana Spearman	6,862	26.8	−15.6
Majority		11,853	46.4	+31.2
Turnout		25,577	55.3	−3.3
Labour hold		Swing	+15.6	

In accordance with the war-time electoral pact, neither the Conservative nor the Liberal parties fielded a candidate. The Labour candidate, William Henry Guy, was opposed by the Revd. P. Figgis, who stood as a "Christian Socialist".

== Result ==
With many men away at war, an electoral register which had not been updated for years, and the seat a safe Labour one, turnout was extremely low at 8.5%. This is the lowest turnout recorded in any UK Parliamentary election since at least the 1918 general election, which was the beginning of universal suffrage in the United Kingdom. Labour retained the seat easily.

Poplar South by-election, 1942 Electorate
Party	Candidate	Votes	%	±%
Labour	William Henry Guy	3,375	86.2	+13.0
Christian Socialist	P. Figgis	541	13.8	New
Majority		2,834	72.4	+26.0
Turnout		3,916	8.5	−46.8
Labour hold		Swing		

== See also ==
- List of United Kingdom by-elections
- Poplar South constituency
- 1914 Poplar by-election
- United Kingdom by-election records
