= Nellie Cressall =

Suffragette and labour activist

Nellie Frances Cressall (née Wilson) (1882–1973) was an East End suffragette and labour activist.

== Early life ==
Cressall is frequently stated to have been born in Stepney, but was actually born at 14 Park Road, Willesden, on 23 November 1882 to carpenter John George Wilson and his wife Julia (born Jennings). In January 1904 she married George Joseph Cressall in St Dunstan's, Stepney, and by the end of the year the newly weds were living at 15 Barnes Street, Limehouse.

== Political career ==
In 1907 Cressall and her husband became politically active and joined the Independent Labour Party. In 1912 she met Sylvia Pankhurst, an encounter that influenced her to join the suffragist cause.

She stated later,

I had been thinking for some time of the unequal rights of men and women. I could not agree that men should be the sole parent, that a mother could not even say whether her child should be vaccinated or not – or that women should receive half pay and many other things as well. I thought that here is something I can dedicate myself to help in some way to put things right.

Cressall joined Sylvia Pankhurst, Keir Hardie, Julia Scurr, Millie Lansbury and George Lansbury in establishing the East London Federation of Suffragettes (ELF) – an organisation that combined socialism with a demand for women's suffrage. The group also began production of a weekly paper for working-class women called The Women's Dreadnought.

It was around this time that Cressall could frequently be heard speaking at meetings at the gates of the East India Docks next to the entrance to Blackwall Tunnel. In November 1919 Cressall and her husband were elected to Poplar Council (the Labour Party had won 39 of the 42 council seats). In 1921 she, along with her husband, was one of Poplar councillors sent to prison for refusing to follow a court order that they implement what they regarded as an unfair form of taxation. She was sent to Holloway Prison on 1 September 1921, along with Susan Lawrence, Julia Scurr, Minnie Lansbury and Jennie Mackay. Nellie was six months pregnant at the time, with her future son Samuel, but nevertheless was left for 24 hours alone in her cell.

The Cressalls had [at the time] five sons between the ages of seven and seventeen, and Nellie, who was thirty-eight, was expecting her sixth. They arranged that the youngest should be cared for by their grandmother, while two of the boys joined the group of children taken to Kent.

Nellie Cressall ... had a particularly gruelling experience. In view of her condition she was immediately put into a cell in the hospital wing. But she was then, apparently, forgotten about for twenty-four hours. When others were let out for exercise, she was ignored and remained locked up. She heard the persistent sound of screaming, and while she was there a woman in a nearby cell committed suicide.

She later said:

Think of it, you mothers, young girls taken from a life of freedom and locked up in cells with doors as thick as a pawnbroker's safe.

Imprisoning a heavily pregnant councillor was a serious mistake on the behalf of the government; public support for Cressall grew and her incarceration became an embarrassment. Just over two weeks after her imprisonment, she was released on health grounds. Cressall, however, refused to go unless her fellow councillors were also released – she was also very suspicious of a document that the authorities asked her to sign, in case it in some way caused her colleagues further problems. In the end, it was LCC Labour group leader, Harry Gosling, who convinced her to leave, on 21 September 1921, close to three weeks after she had been locked up. The Poplar Rates Rebellion was successful with the government and the London County Council backing down. The rest of the imprisoned councillors were released on 12 October 1921.

Cressall became the first female Mayor of Poplar in 1943, holding the post for a year, as customary. (Her husband George had been Mayor of Poplar from 1931 to 1932.)

At the 1951 Labour Party Conference – in the year she became a widow – she made a passionate speech about the progress that had been made since the First World War:

Years ago after the First World War many, many people in my constituency sat in the dark because they had not got a penny to put in the gas. Today what do I find? People come to me creating about the heavy electricity bills they have to pay! ... I have young people coming worrying me for houses.... We have got some houses where six families lived once upon a time ... Whereas in the old days people would get married, as I did, and be contented in two nice little rooms, today our young people want a home of their own.

Two years later, at the 1953 Labour Party Conference, she was equally forthright.

Nellie Cressall, of Poplar, the widow of Labour pioneer George Lansbury's election agent, who roused the audience to prolonged applause and cheering when she spoke at the annual Labour Party Conference here. Mrs Cressall, who is 69, has 26 grandchildren and eight great-grandchildren. She attacked the Conservatives and the Housewives League on the cost-of-living cries. Aneurin Bevan – a master of fiery platform speaking – said her speech was the finest heard at the conference. Mrs Cressall 'discovered' the Prime Minister, when in 1907 he knocked at her door and asked to see her husband as he wanted to help the Labour movement.

The Cressels had eight children, seven boys and a girl: Walter Percival (1904-1942), Thomas William (1906-1938), Albert John (1907-1995), George Phillip (1910-1986), Charles Keir (1914-1979), Samuel Lawrence (1921-1974), Bessie Susan (1923-1995) and Edgar Frederick (1927-1983).

In 1923 the Cressalls moved to 15 Macquarie Way on the Isle of Dogs, where Nellie spent her remaining years until her death in 1973, the last of the Poplar Councillors. George Joseph Cressall was appointed OBE in the 1949 New Year Honours for political and public services in Poplar.

== See also ==
- Council of Workers' and Soldiers' Delegates
- Poplar Rates Rebellion Mural

Civic offices
Preceded by E. Stevens	Mayor of Poplar; 1943–1944	Succeeded by Lilian Maud Sadler
