= Edgar Lansbury =

Edgar Lansbury may refer to:

- Edgar Lansbury (politician) (1887–1935), British socialist politician active in the East End of London; father of Angela, Bruce and Edgar
- Edgar Lansbury (producer) (born 1930), American-based television producer and son of the politician with the same name; brother of Angela and Bruce
