= Poplar (London County Council constituency) =

London County Council constituency

- Former constituency for the London County Council

Former constituency
- Created: 1889; 1949
- Abolished: 1919; 1965
- Member(s): 3
- Created from: Bow and Bromley and Poplar South
- Replaced by: Poplar South

Poplar was a constituency used for elections to the London County Council between 1889 and 1919, and again between 1949 and the council's abolition, in 1965. The seat shared boundaries with the UK Parliament constituency of the same name.

== Councillors ==
Year	Name	Party	Name	Party
1889	William Pelham Bullivant	Moderate	John McDougall	Progressive
1892	Will Crooks	Labour Progressive	John McDougall	Progressive
1910	Will Crooks	Labour Progressive	Robert Ensor	Labour
1913	St John Hutchinson	Progressive	Susan Lawrence	Labour

Year	Name	Party	Name	Party	Name	Party
1949	Frederick Thomas Baldock	Labour	John Branagan	Labour	William Henry Guy	Labour
1952	Arthur Niederman	Labour	John Branagan	Labour	William Henry Guy	Labour

== Election results ==
=== 1889 to 1919 ===
1889 London County Council election: Poplar
Party	Candidate	Votes	%	±%
Moderate	William Pelham Bullivant	2,925		
Progressive	John McDougall	2,345		
Progressive	Richard Cecil Grosvenor	2,215		
Moderate	John Lenanton	1,363		
Moderate win (new seat)				
Progressive win (new seat)				

1892 London County Council election: Poplar
Party	Candidate	Votes	%	±%
Progressive	John McDougall	3,713		
Progressive	Will Crooks	3,465		
Moderate	William Pelham Bullivant	2,422		
Moderate	Alfred Back	1,941		
Progressive gain from Moderate		Swing		
Progressive hold		Swing		

1895 London County Council election: Poplar
Party	Candidate	Votes	%	±%
Progressive	Will Crooks	3,052		
Progressive	John McDougall	2,844		
Moderate	T. H. Clarke	2,427		
Progressive hold		Swing		
Progressive hold		Swing		

1898 London County Council election: Poplar
Party	Candidate	Votes	%	±%
Progressive	Will Crooks	3,632		
Progressive	John McDougall	3,310		
Moderate	J. B. Atlay	1,585		
Progressive hold		Swing		

1901 London County Council election: Poplar
Party	Candidate	Votes	%	±%
Progressive	Will Crooks	unopposed	n/a	n/a
Progressive	John McDougall	unopposed	n/a	n/a
Progressive hold		Swing	n/a	
Progressive hold		Swing	n/a	

1904 London County Council election: Poplar
Party	Candidate	Votes	%	±%
Progressive	Will Crooks	3,565		
Progressive	John McDougall	3,169		
Conservative	T. H. Clarke	1,891		
Majority				
Progressive hold		Swing		

1907 London County Council election: Poplar
Party	Candidate	Votes	%	±%
Progressive	Will Crooks	3,504		
Progressive	John McDougall	3,476		
Municipal Reform	T. H. Clarke	2,778		
Municipal Reform	A. Maude	2,579		
Majority		725		
Progressive hold		Swing		

1910 London County Council election: Poplar
Party	Candidate	Votes	%	±%
Progressive	John McDougall	3,169		
Labour	Robert Ensor	2,835		
Municipal Reform	T. J. Clarke	1,883		
Majority				
Labour gain from Progressive		Swing		
Progressive hold		Swing		

1913 London County Council election: Poplar
Party	Candidate	Votes	%	±%
Progressive	St John Hutchinson	3,061		
Labour	Susan Lawrence	2,960		
Municipal Reform	T. Vosper	1,599		
Municipal Reform	Elliott	1,492		
Majority		1,361		
Labour hold		Swing		
Majority		1,462		
Progressive hold		Swing		

=== 1949 to 1965 ===
1949 London County Council election: Poplar
Party	Candidate	Votes	%	±%
Labour	William Henry Guy	13,219		
Labour	John Branagan	12,864		
Labour	Frederick Thomas Baldock	12,518		
Conservative	C. P. T. Burke	4,237		
Conservative	Joan Vickers	3,935		
Conservative	W. S. Pennicutt	3,826		

1952 London County Council election: Poplar
Party	Candidate	Votes	%	±%
Labour	William Henry Guy	14,485		
Labour	John Branagan	13,871		
Labour	Arthur Niederman	13,581		
Conservative	R. E. Gayler	2,406		
Conservative	M. Lazarus	1,876		
Conservative	R. W. Hudson	1,820		
Labour hold		Swing		

1955 London County Council election: Poplar
Party	Candidate	Votes	%	±%
Labour	William Henry Guy	9,698		
Labour	John Branagan	9,093		
Labour	Arthur Niederman	8,974		
Conservative	A. L. Causton	2,037		
Conservative	J. T. Reynolds	1,766		
Conservative	Gerard Vaughan	1,689		
Labour hold		Swing		

1958 London County Council election: Poplar
Party	Candidate	Votes	%	±%
Labour	William Henry Guy	10,173		
Labour	Arthur Niederman	9,565		
Labour	John Branagan	9,498		
Conservative	R. E. G. Howe	1,464		
Conservative	J. T. Reynolds	1,157		
Conservative	F. A. Rowland	1,090		
Labour hold		Swing		

1961 London County Council election: Poplar
Party	Candidate	Votes	%	±%
Labour	William Henry Guy	9,871		
Labour	Arthur Niederman	9,095		
Labour	John Branagan	9,003		
Conservative	E. A. F. Horey	1,680		
Conservative	A. J. Lawrence	1,510		
Conservative	F. A. Rowland	1,341		
Labour hold		Swing		
