= Minnie Lansbury =

British politician

Chairperson of the East London Federation of Suffragettes
- In office 1915–1922

Alderman of Poplar Borough Council
- In office 1919–1922

Personal details
- Born: Minnie Glassman c. 1889 Stepney, London, England
- Died: 1 January 1922 London, England
- Party: Labour
- Spouse: Edgar Lansbury (m. 1914)
- Occupation: Politician, suffragette

Minnie Lansbury (née Glassman; 1889 – 1 January 1922) was an English suffragette and the first female alderman on the first Labour-led council in the Metropolitan Borough of Poplar, England. She died after contracting pneumonia while imprisoned for refusing to levy full rates in Poplar.

== Family ==
Lansbury was born about 1889, off Brick Lane in Stepney, London. She was the daughter of Isaac Glassman, a Polish-born coal merchant, and his wife Annie Glassman. Her parents were Jewish immigrants.

In 1914, she married Edgar Lansbury. He was the son of George Lansbury, mayor of Poplar and later leader of the Labour Party, and Elizabeth Lansbury (née Brine). After Lansbury's death, Edgar remarried to actress Moyna Macgill and became the father of actor Angela Lansbury, Bruce Lansbury and Edgar Lansbury Jr.

== Career ==
Lansbury became a teacher, and joined the East London Federation of Suffragettes in 1915. She made arrangements with the film distribution company Pathé News to film suffrage meetings.

Lansbury was persuaded by Sylvia Pankhurst to give up her teaching post to become the secretary of the League of Rights for Soldiers' and Sailors' Wives and Relatives, fighting for the rights of widows, orphans and wounded soldiers from World War I. She was the first woman to be elected alderman on Poplar’s first Labour council in 1919, after a change in the law allowed some women to receive Parliamentary suffrage and stand as candidates.

In 1921, Lansbury was one of five women on Poplar Council who, along with their male colleagues including her husband and father-in-law, were jailed for six weeks for refusing to levy full rates in the poverty-stricken area. She said of the arrests that "if we said the word, the people of Poplar would prevent our arrest by no less than a machine-gun corps."

Due to her imprisonment in Holloway Prison, Lansbury developed bronchitis and pneumonia and died on 1 January 1922, aged 32. Lansbury was buried in the Jewish cemetery in East Ham, with "thousands" of women assembling near her home to walk with the funeral procession.

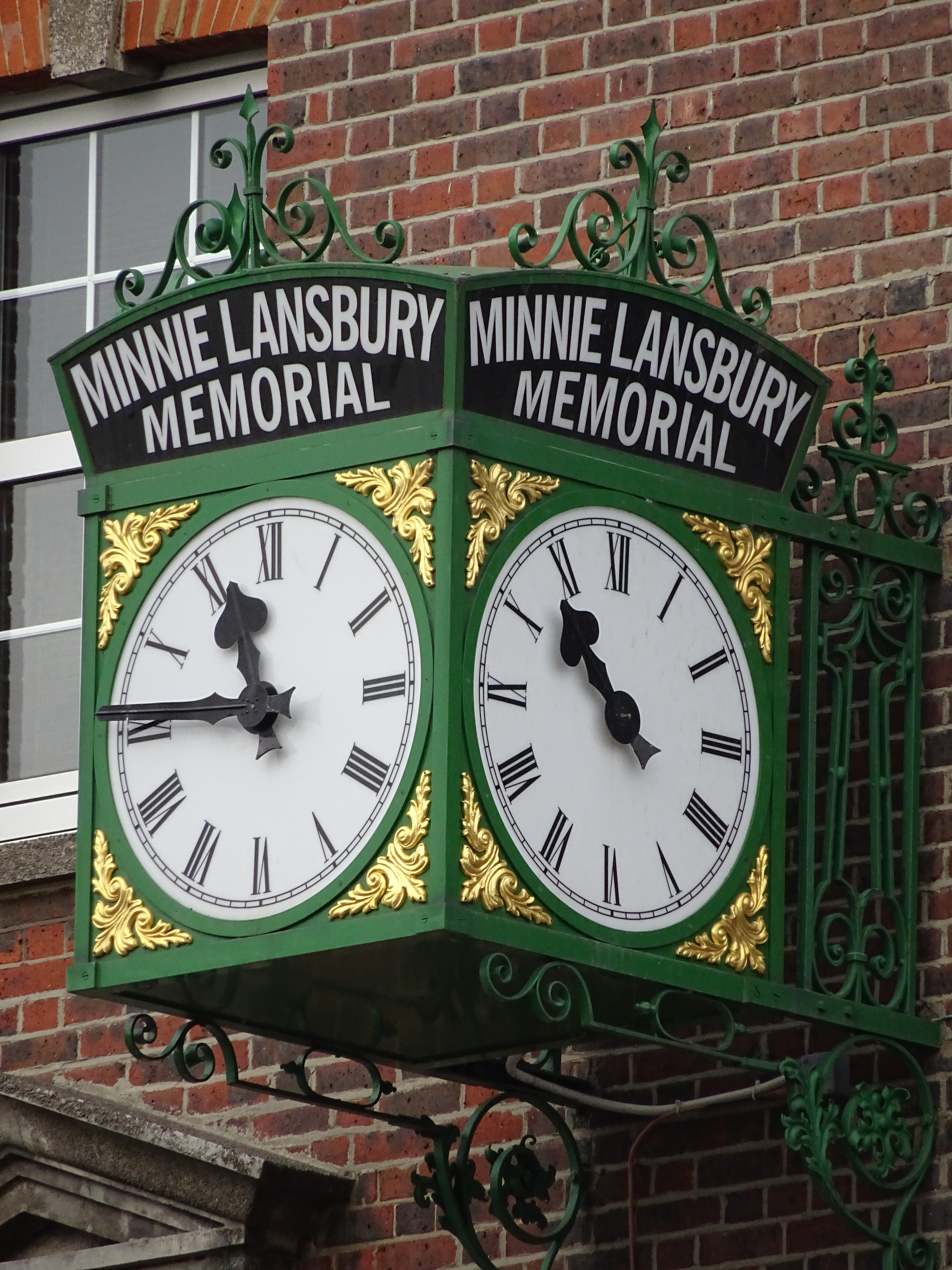
The Minnie Lansbury Memorial Clock, Bow Road, upon restoration in 2018

== Legacy ==
There is a Minnie Lansbury Memorial Clock on Electric House in Bow Road, Tower Hamlets that was erected in the 1930s. The Memorial Clock was restored in 2008 and re-fitted on Electric House. The clock was restored through a public appeal organised by the Jewish East End Celebration Society and the Heritage of London Trust. From the appeal the Heritage of London Trust raised over £13,000, which was given to Tower Hamlets Council to complete the restoration. Angela Lansbury was among those who made a donation towards the restoration of the clock. The restored clock, now painted green and gold, was officially unveiled in the presence of relatives of Minnie Lansbury and local people on Thursday, 16 October 2008.

Lansbury's name and picture (and those of 58 other women's suffrage supporters) are on the plinth of the statue of Millicent Fawcett in Parliament Square, London, unveiled in 2018.

== Bibliography ==
- "Timely reminder of a suffragette", Jewish Chronicle, 13 April 2007, p. 6
- "Lansbury's Tribute to suffragette 'heroine'", East London Advertiser, 16 October 2008, p. 4
