= Alfred Yeo =

Alfred Yeo may refer to:

- Sir Alfred Yeo (British politician) (1863–1928), British politician, businessman, and public servant
- Alfred Yeo (Australian politician) (1890–1976), Australian member of the New South Wales Legislative Assembly
