= 1914 Poplar by-election =

1914 UK parliamentary by-election

← 1910	19 February 1914	1918 →

Candidate	Yeo	Clark	Jones
Party	Liberal	Unionist	British Socialist Party
Popular vote	3,548	3,270	893
Percentage	46.0%	42.4%	11.6%
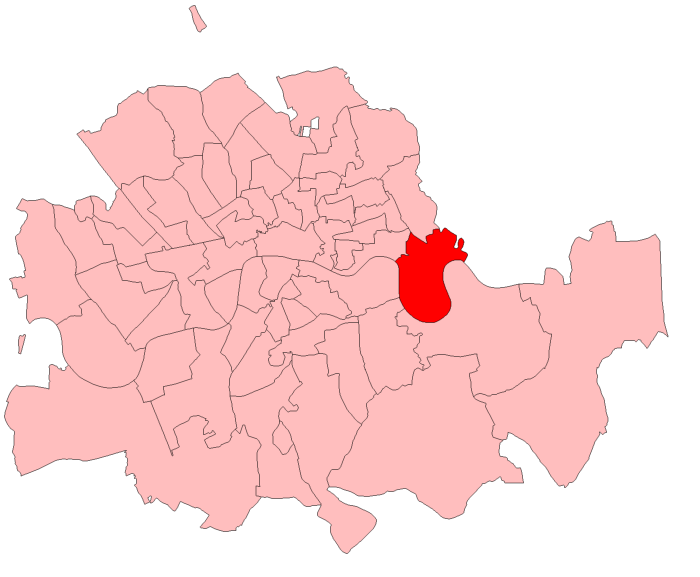
MP before election
Buxton
Liberal
Subsequent MP
Yeo
Liberal

The 1914 Poplar by-election was a Parliamentary by-election held on 19 February 1914. The constituency returned one Member of Parliament (MP) to the House of Commons of the United Kingdom, elected by the first past the post voting system.

== Vacancy ==
In February 1914, Sydney Buxton, the Liberal MP for Poplar since 1886, resigned to take up an appointment as Governor-General of the Union of South Africa.

== Electoral history ==
General election December 1910: Poplar
Party	Candidate	Votes	%	±%
Liberal	Sydney Buxton	3,977	64.9	+7.7
Conservative	Ellis Ashmead-Bartlett	2,148	35.1	−7.7
Majority		1,829	29.8	+15.4
Turnout		6,125	69.2	−13.2
Liberal hold		Swing	+7.7	

== Candidates ==
- Alfred William Yeo was selected as Liberal candidate. This followed reported splits and disagreements in the local Liberal Party with some elements having supported Sir Victor Horsley, the scientist and surgeon, as potential candidate over Yeo. Yeo was an elected member of the Metropolitan Borough of Poplar. He served as a member of Poplar Board of Guardians, the body charged with administering the English Poor Laws. He also worked for ten years as Chairman of the Poplar Distress Committee, a body set up under the Unemployed Workmen Act 1905 to provide grants to create jobs. In 1903–04, Yeo was elected Mayor of Poplar.
- The local Labour Party considered contesting the election. They were considering adopting Harry Gosling, a former Liberal candidate as their prospective parliamentary candidate. However, they valued their relationship with the local Liberals; At the 1910 and 1913 London County Council elections, a Labour candidate and a Progressive (Liberal) candidate had run in harness against two Municipal Reform (Conservative) candidates, with success. Also the Liberals had withdrawn their candidate from neighbouring Bow & Bromley for the parliamentary elections in December 1910 and 1912, to assist Labour's George Lansbury. They would have been happier when the local Liberals selected Yeo rather than Horsley.
- Robin Kerr-Clark stood for the Conservative Party.
- The British Socialist Party, and its forerunner the Social Democratic Federation were opposed to Socialists making electoral pacts with Liberals. At the 1913 county council elections they responded to Labour allowing the Progressives a free run in Bow & Bromley by fielding two of their own candidates instead. Though they polled well, the result of their intervention was to hand the seats to the Municipal Reform Party. The BSP adopted the same strategy for this by-election and chose Jack Jones to stand as their candidate. In the 1906 general election, Jones unsuccessfully stood for Camborne. In 1911, he became a trade union organiser, for the National Union of General Workers.

== Campaign ==
The Unionist campaign was given a boost by the Conservative by-election victory in nearby Bethnal Green South West declared the day before polling day.

== Result ==
Alfred William Yeo held the seat for the Liberal Party with a much reduced majority.

Yeo

By-Election 19 February 1914: Poplar
Party	Candidate	Votes	%	±%
Liberal	Alfred William Yeo	3,548	46.0	−18.9
Unionist	Robin S. Kerr-Clark	3,270	42.4	+7.3
British Socialist Party	Jack Jones	893	11.6	New
Majority		278	3.6	−26.2
Turnout		7,711	79.8	+10.6
Liberal hold		Swing	-13.1	

== Aftermath ==
A General Election was due to take place by the end of 1915. By the autumn of 1914, the following candidates had been adopted to contest that election. Due to the outbreak of war, the election never took place.

- Liberal:Alfred William Yeo
- Unionist:}

General election 14 December 1918: Poplar South
Party	Candidate	Votes	%	±%
Liberal	*Alfred William Yeo	8,571	49.4	
Labour	Samuel March	4,446	25.6	New
NFDDSS	Wilfrid T. Allen	4,339	25.0	New
Majority		4,125	23.8	
Turnout		36,077	48.1	
Liberal hold		Swing		

- endorsed candidate of the Coalition Government.
