= Poplar Rates Rebellion Mural =

Mural in Poplar, London, England

Coordinates: 51.50963°N 0.01755°W

The Poplar Rates Rebellion Mural is a mural in Hale Street, Poplar, London, London. It is painted on the wall of the depot of Tower Hamlets Parks Department.

The mural commemorates the Poplar Rates Rebellion of 1921, when Poplar Borough Council, led by former mayor George Lansbury, refused to pay precepts to London County Council, the Metropolitan Police, the Metropolitan Asylums Board and the Metropolitan Water Board, as a protest against the inequity of the system of local rates. Poplar was a poor borough, with a high level of poverty and "outdoor relief" which the council was required to fund for itself under the poor laws.

The mural records that 30 councillors were imprisoned for contempt of court for refusing a comply with a court order requiring the precepts to be paid. The council continued to hold meetings while the councillors were in prison, with women councillors in Holloway Prison taken by taxi to meet with the men in Brixton Prison. The campaign was widely supported by the general public and trades unions, and in due course the councillors were released from prison. Parliament quickly passed the Local Authorities (Financial Provisions) Act 1921 to try to equalise tax burdens between rich and poor boroughs.

The mural was painted by Mark Francis in 1990. It has four panels, including an image of George Lansbury wearing his mayoral chain of office; placards reading "Can't Pay Won't Pay"', references to the campaign to abolish the 1990s era poll tax, and a list of the names of the imprisoned councillors. It was restored in 2007 by David Bratby and Maureen Delenian.

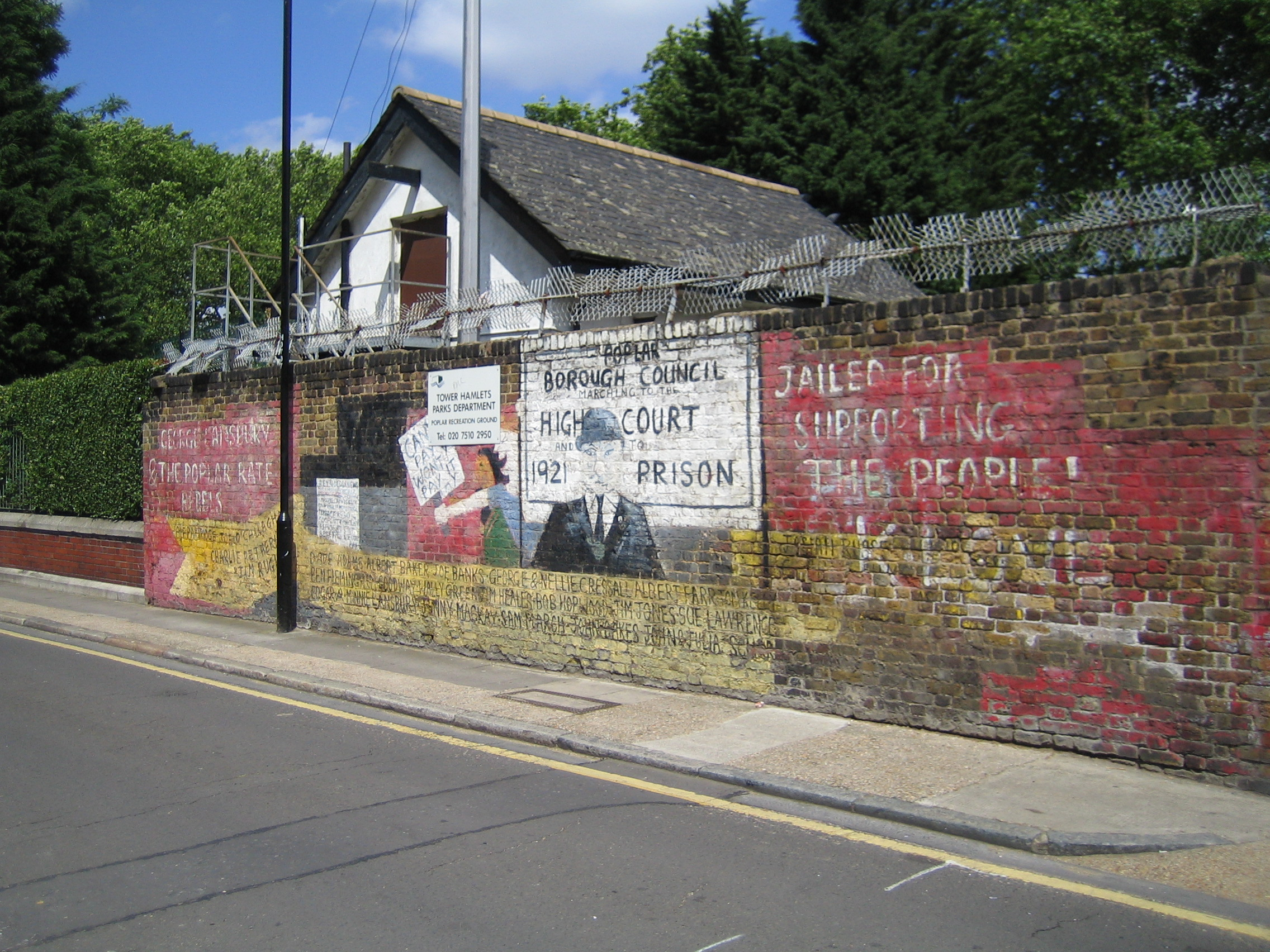
2006, before restoration

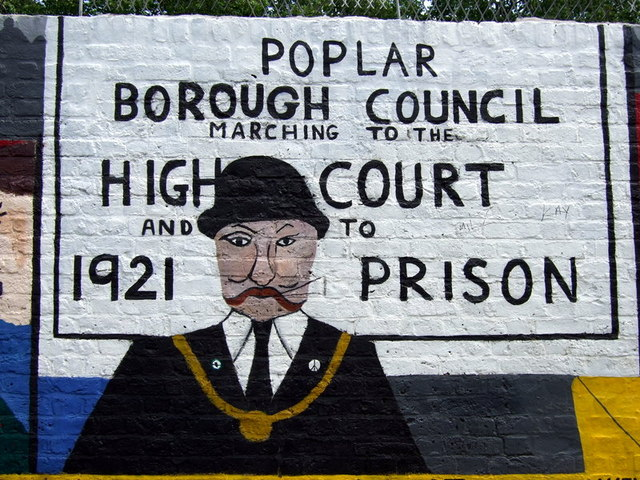
Detail of George Lansbury

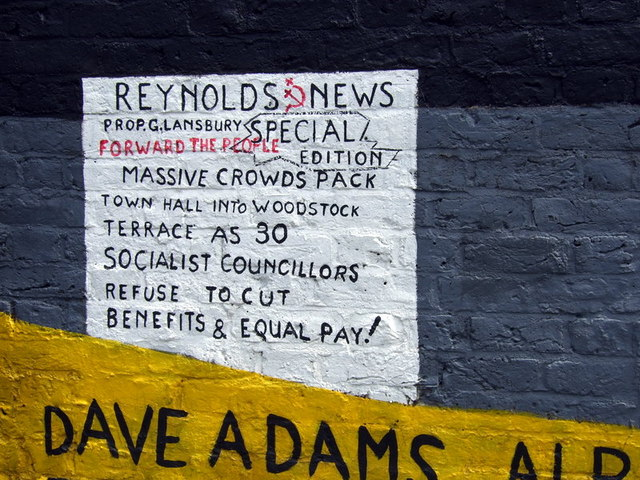
Detail
