= William Wallace Bruce =

British politician

William Wallace Bruce (18 January 1846 – 20 October 1907) was a British politician, who served on London County Council.

Bruce lived in London near Hyde Park, and was a member of the Arts Club from 1874. He was actively involved in Toynbee Hall, and supported the Progressive Party. In his later years, he was a director of the Newdigate Colliery Company. He also served in the Artists Rifles, becoming a lieutenant colonel.

At the 1892 London County Council election, Bruce was elected in Bow and Bromley. From 1899 until 1901, he chaired the council's finance committee, and he later chaired the Housing of the Working Class Committee. He died in 1907, still in office.

Political offices
Preceded by Reginald Welby	Chairman of the Finance Committee of London County Council; 1899–1901	Succeeded by Reginald Welby
