= Sir John McDougall Gardens =

Park in London, England

Coordinates: 51°29′49″N 0°01′36″W

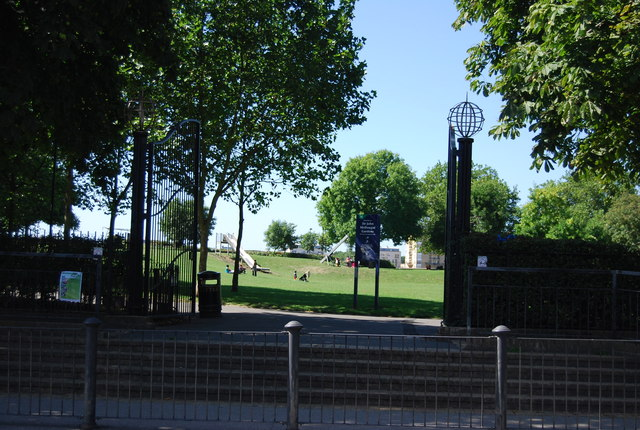
A view of the Sir John McDougall Gardens from the busy Westferry Road towards the river embankment. (2013)

Sir John McDougall Gardens is a grassed and wooded area along the River Thames on the Isle of Dogs in London, England. It houses a playground, an outdoor gym and a Thames-side path. It covers just over 6 acres (2.4 ha), between the River Thames and Westferry Road.

The park is named after Sir John McDougall, a local member of the London County Council (LCC) in the 1900s. He was a flour miller and owned a nearby mill, the Wheatsheaf Mill, demolished in 1980.

Sir John McDougall Gardens was opened in 1968, on a site left in ruins by the bombing of Docklands in World War II. Local children were involved in the original planting of trees. A footbridge across Westferry Road was completed in 1969 to link it directly to the large Barkantine Estate of social housing.

The park was re-modelled in the 1980s by the London Docklands Development Corporation when the ground level was bought up to the top of the river wall to allow a view of the River Thames.
