= Edward Cruse =

British politician and trade unionist

Edward Cruse (1867 – 15 December 1938) was a British politician and trade unionist, who served on the London County Council.

Born in Tottenham, Cruse grew up in Bow and became a gunmaker. He joined the Amalgamated Society of General Tool Makers, Engineers and Machinists, and from 1920 served as an Organising District Delegate for the union. Later in the year, the union became part of the Amalgamated Engineering Union, and Cruse continued in the same role.

Cruse was a supporter of the Labour Party. At the 1919 London County Council election, he was elected in Bow and Bromley. In 1927/28, he served as deputy chair of the council.

Cruse died in 1938, while still in office. After his death, the council named a ship after him, which was used to transport sludge to the North Sea.
