= George William Mills =

British Politician

George William Mills (1876 – 21 January 1933) was a British politician, who served on London County Council.

Born in Whitechapel, Mills received an elementary education before working a variety of jobs, eventually becoming a poor law officer. He joined the Municipal Employees' Association in 1906, and remained a member when it became part of the National Union of General Workers. From 1911, he served on Poplar Metropolitan Borough Council, and he also chaired the Stepney and Poplar War Pensions Committee from 1924 to 1926.

At the 1925 London County Council election, Mills was elected to represent Poplar South. He resigned in 1930, and died three years later.
