= Charlie Sumner (politician) =

British politics (1867–1925)

Charles Edwin Sumner (1867 – 8 December 1925) was a British politician and trade unionist, who served on London County Council.

Sumner worked as a boilerman at Pearce's chemical factory in the East End of London, and in the 1890s he joined the Bromley East branch of the National Union of Gasworkers and General Labourers. He later became a full-time organiser for the union.

From the 1890s, Sumner was active in the Social Democratic Federation, and he was elected to Poplar Metropolitan Borough Council in 1900, also winning a place on the Board of Guardians. He remained in the party as it became the British Socialist Party, for which he stood unsuccessfully in the 1913 London County Council election. He was part of the minority in the party who supported British involvement in World War I, joining the National Socialist Party split, and devoting his time thereafter to the Labour Party. During the war, he also served on the local military conscription tribunal. At the 1919 London County Council election, he was elected, representing Bow and Bromley.

By 1921, Sumner was the most senior Labour councillor in Poplar, and he was elected as the borough's mayor. That year saw the Poplar Rates Rebellion, in which the councillors refused to pass on precepts to London-wide authorities, in protest at the very limited redistribution of wealth from richer to poorer areas of London. Sumner spoke in support of the council at the Trades Union Congress, and on his return to London became was the last councillor arrested. He was one of thirty councillors imprisoned, and his health suffered. However, the protest proved successful, and on his release, he returned to politics.

Sumner died in 1925, one of five councillors said to have died early due to mistreatment in prison.

Civic offices
| Preceded by Samuel March | Mayor of Poplar; 1921–1922 | Succeeded by John Scurr |
