= Poplar Rates Rebellion =

Tax protest in England in 1921

The Poplar Rates Rebellion, or Poplar Rates Revolt, was a tax protest that took place in the Metropolitan Borough of Poplar, England, in 1921. It was led by George Lansbury, the previous year's Labour Mayor of Poplar, with the support of the Poplar Borough Council, most of whom were industrial workers. The protest defied government, the courts, and the Labour Party leadership. Lansbury would later go on to be the leader of the Labour Party.

== Background ==
An inner city borough in the heart of London's East End, Poplar was one of the poorest boroughs. There was no government support to alleviate the high unemployment, hunger, and poverty in the borough, and the work of Poplar Poor Law Union had to be funded by the borough itself under the poor law.

Poplar Borough Council's Labour administration elected in 1919 undertook a comprehensive programme of social reform and poor relief, including equal pay for women and a minimum wage for council workers, far in excess of the market rate. This programme was expensive and had to be funded from the rates.

Because Poplar was a poor borough, property rents were low. With liability for local taxation assessed on the basis of a 'rateable value' deriving from rents, Poplar Borough Council had to set a much higher rate in order to produce the same amount as produced by low rates in a wealthy borough. In addition to the precept for Poplar Poor Law Union, Poplar ratepayers were also charged precepts to pay for the London County Council, Metropolitan Police, Metropolitan Asylums Board and the Metropolitan Water Board.

There was a small fund which attempted to correct for the different rate products but Poplar called for complete equalisation of the rates so that the same rate brought in the same income both to Poplar and to a wealthier West London borough.

== History ==
In 1921, faced with the prospect of a further large increase in the rates, Poplar Borough Council decided to hold them down by not collecting the precepts which it should have passed on to the four cross-London authorities. The London County Council and Metropolitan Asylums Board responded by taking the matter to the High Court. The council's response was to organise a procession of 2,000 supporters from Bow on 28 July 1921, led by the borough's official mace-bearer, to the accompaniment of a band and a banner proclaiming, "Poplar Borough Council marching to the High Court and possibly to prison".

Thirty councillors, including six women, one of whom, Nellie Cressall, was pregnant, were sent to prison indefinitely for contempt of court for refusing a court order to remit the monies. The men were put up in Brixton Prison, and the women in Holloway (where they were much better treated than the men). Susan Lawrence used the time to read Tolstoy and prepare a pamphlet on taxation. Another of the jailed women was Lansbury's own daughter-in-law Minnie Lansbury, who, due to her imprisonment, developed pneumonia and died at the age of 32.

The councillors were:

- David Morgan Adams
- Albert Baker
- Joseph Henry Banks
- George Cressall
- Nellie Cressall
- Albert Victor Farr
- Benjamin Fleming
- Thomas John Goodway
- Walter Henry Green
- James Joseph Heales
- Robert John Hopwood
- James Horatio Jones
- Thomas Edwin Kelly
- Edgar Lansbury
- Minnie Lansbury
- George Lansbury
- Susan Lawrence
- Jennie Mackay
- Samuel March
- John Edward Oakes
- Joseph Thomas O'Callaghan
- Alfred Partridge
- Charles Petherick
- James John Rugless
- Josiah Russell
- John Scurr
- Julia Scurr
- Henry William Sloman
- Charlie Sumner
- Christopher Edward Williams

== Outcome ==
The revolt received wide public support. Lansbury addressed crowds that regularly gathered outside, through the prison bars. Neighbouring councils threatened to take similar action. Trade unions passed resolutions of support and collected funds for the councillors' families. Eventually, after six weeks' imprisonment, the court ordered the councillors released, which occasioned great celebrations in Poplar.

Meanwhile, a bill, the Local Authorities (Financial Provisions) Act 1921, was rushed through Parliament between 8 November and 10 November 1921. It more or less equalised tax burdens between rich and poor boroughs. The new Act also introduced a power, in clause 2, permitting a precepting authority to apply to the courts for the appointment of a receiver to take the funds directly from a council that withheld them.

In 1925, the district auditor surcharged the councillors for Poplar Borough Council's policies of more generous pay for council workers, and equal pay for women workers. The surcharge was challenged by judicial review in the courts; eventually, in Roberts v Hopwood, the House of Lords ruled that the increased pay was unlawful, and upheld the surcharge.

Despite the equalisation of rates, the dispute regarding the monies paid for outdoor relief would continue for some years until the abolition of the poor law unions. Under the Local Government Act 1929, the responsibility for the provision of outdoor relief transferred from the Poplar Poor Law Union to the London County Council, and thereby the financial burden was spread across the entire County of London.

Lansbury was hailed as a hero; in the 1922 general election he won the parliamentary seat of Bow and Bromley with a majority of nearly 7,000, and would hold it for the rest of his life, including his period as Leader of the Labour Party. The term "Poplarism", always identified closely with Lansbury, became a political term associated with large-scale municipal relief for the poor and needy, and also came to be applied generally to campaigns where local government stood against central government on behalf of the poor and least privileged of society.

== The Hale Street Mural ==
In 1990, local artist Mark Francis painted a mural on the wall of the Tower Hamlets Parks Department depot on Hale Street, Poplar.

The mural commemorates the Poplar Rates Rebellion over four panels, including an image of George Lansbury wearing his mayoral chain of office; placards reading "Can't Pay Won't Pay", and a list of the names of the imprisoned councillors. The fourth panel draws a parallel with the contemporary campaign against the 1990s-era poll tax.

The mural was restored in 2007 by David Bratby and Maureen Delenian.

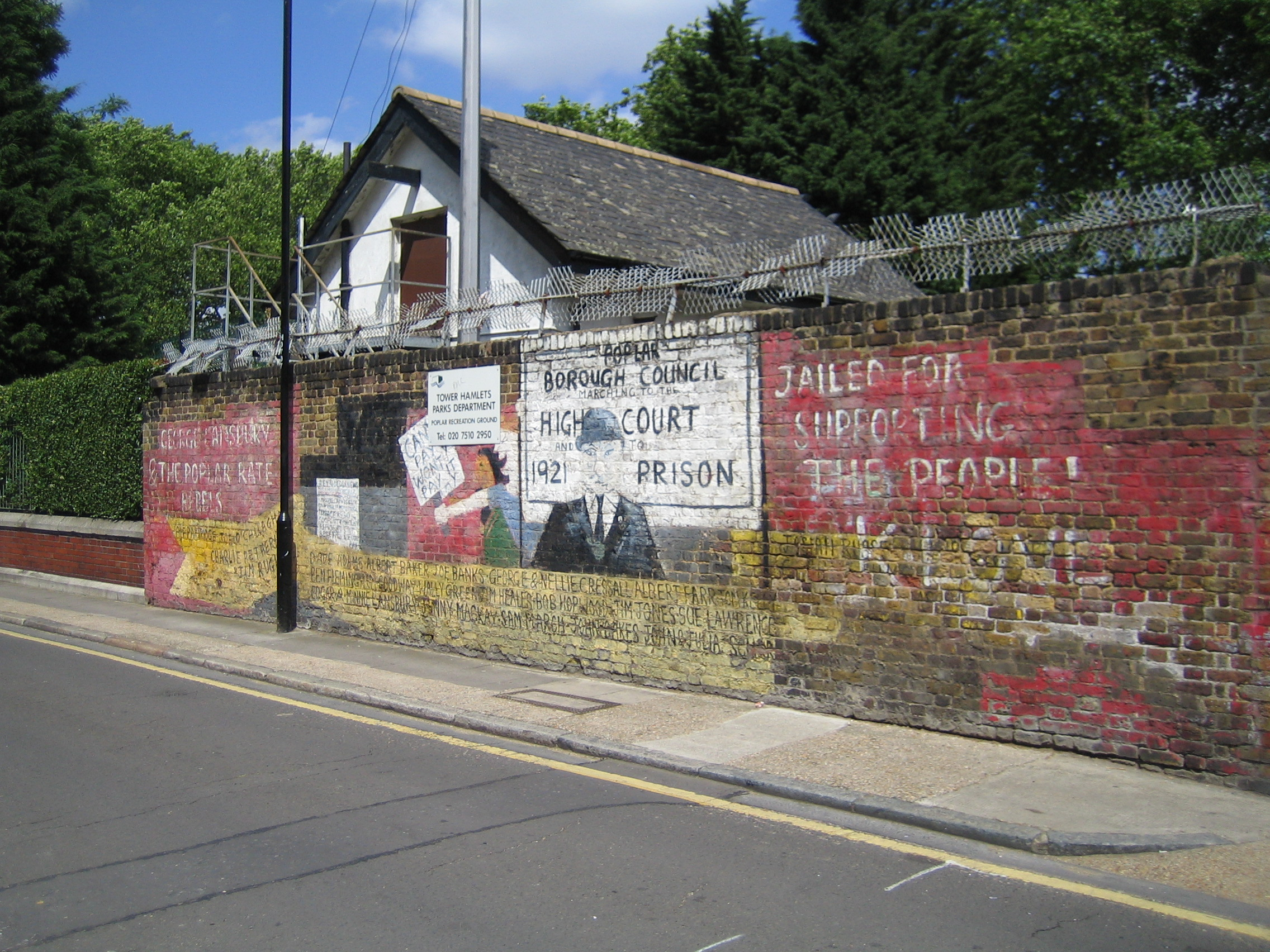
2006, before restoration

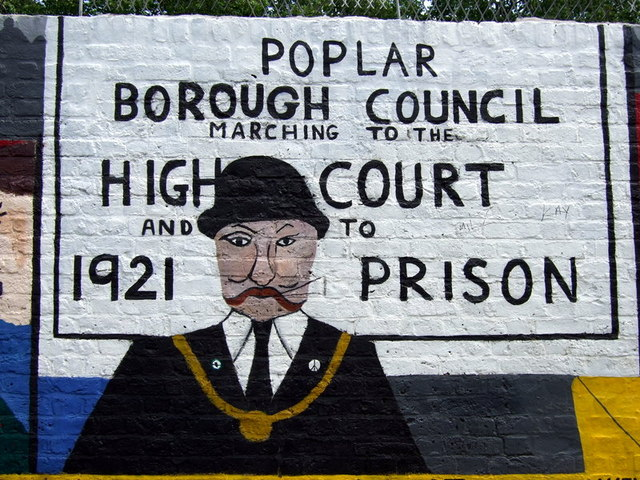
Detail of George Lansbury

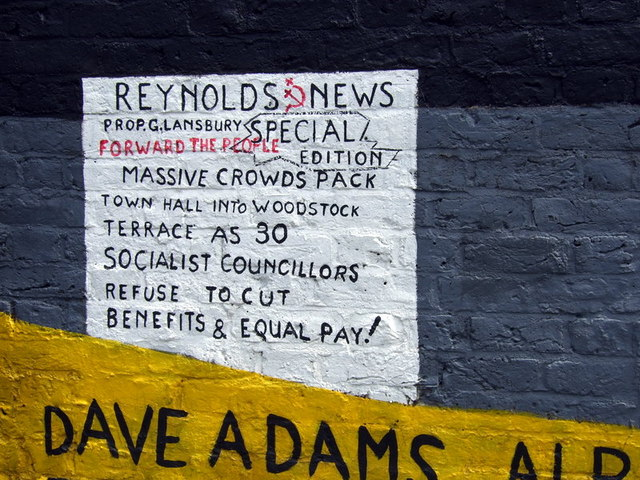
Detail
