= Henry Green (MP for Poplar) =

English shipowner and Liberal politician

- Born: 1838; Blackwall, London
- Died: 7 June 1900 (aged 61–62); Charlton, London
- Occupations: Shipowner, politician
- Spouse: Frances Gisborne Lewin

Henry Green (1838 – 7 June 1900) was an English shipowner and Liberal politician.

== Life ==
Green was born at Blackwall, London, the son of Henry Green of Blackwall and Walthamstow. He was educated at Cheam School and at Bonn University. He became a senior partner in the London shipowning firm of R & H Green, and a director of the East and West India Dock Company. He was president of the Chamber of Shipping and in 1884 was appointed to a royal commission to enquire into the loss of life and property at sea. Green was also J.P. for Middlesex.

In the 1885 general election, Green was elected Member of Parliament for Poplar but he stood down in the 1886 general election.

Green married Frances Gisborne Lewin who was born in India. He lived at The Cherry Orchard, Old Charlton, Kent until his death on 7 June 1900 at the age of 61.

Parliament of the United Kingdom
New constituency	Member of Parliament for Poplar; 1885 – 1886	Succeeded by Sydney Buxton
