= William Henry Guy =

British politician (1890–1968)

William Henry Guy (1890 – 1 August 1968) was a British Labour Party politician.

The son of a blacksmith, he came from a family of 21 children. In 1934 he was elected as a member of London County Council, representing Poplar South. He remained a member of the LCC until its abolition in 1965, latterly representing Poplar.

In August 1942 the sitting Labour Member of Parliament for Poplar South died. The vacancy occurred at the height of the Second World War, and under an agreement between the parties forming the wartime coalition government, Guy was expected to take the seat at the ensuing by-election unopposed. In the event he was opposed by the Reverend Patrick Figgis running as a "Christian Socialist". The poll took place on 13 August, with a turnout of less than 10% of the electorate and Guy secured 3,375 votes to 541 for Figgis.

Guy retained the seat at the 1945 general election, but retired from the Commons at the 1950 election, when the Poplar South constituency was abolished. He became a member of Poplar Borough Council, and was mayor of Poplar in 1953. He was a director of the Amalgamated Tobacco Corporation.

He died in Poplar in August 1968.

Parliament of the United Kingdom
Preceded by David Morgan Adams	Member of Parliament for Poplar South; 1942 – 1950	Constituency abolished
Civic offices
Preceded by William Isaac Brinson	Mayor of Poplar; 1953–1954	Succeeded by Ebenezer John Cauldwell
