= Henry Harcourt =

Henry Harcourt CBE (20 September 1873 – 20 February 1933) was a British barrister, Indian civil servant and Liberal Party politician.

== Background ==
Harcourt was the son of R.F. and Caroline Harcourt. He was educated at Merchant Taylors' school, London and Pembroke College, Oxford (Scholar) where in 1894 he obtained a 2nd class Honour Moderations and in 1896 a 2nd class in Literae Humaniores. He married Emma Newton who died in 1907. He then married Elsie Mary Knight. They had two sons and three daughters. In 1919 he was made a Commander of the Order of the British Empire.

== Professional career ==
In 1896 Harcourt joined the Indian Civil Service, serving in India from 1897 to 1923. He was District Judge, in Delhi, 1904–06 and Deputy Commissioner, in Rohtak, 1914–19. He was a Captain in the Indian Defence Force, Voluntary Division. In 1920 he received a call to the bar and joined the South East Circuit. In 1924, his work Sidelights on the Crisis in India was published.

== Political career ==
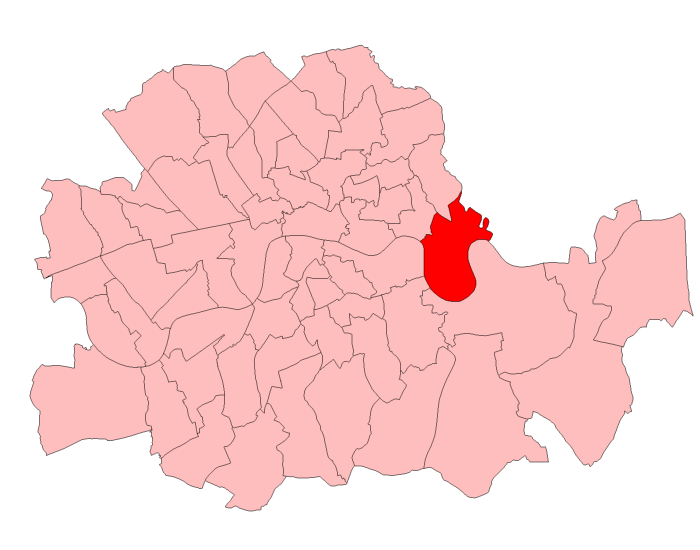
Poplar South in the County of London, showing boundaries used in 1928

Harcourt was Progressive candidate for the South division of Poplar at the 1928 London County Council Election. He was Liberal candidate for the North West division of Camberwell at the 1929 General Election.

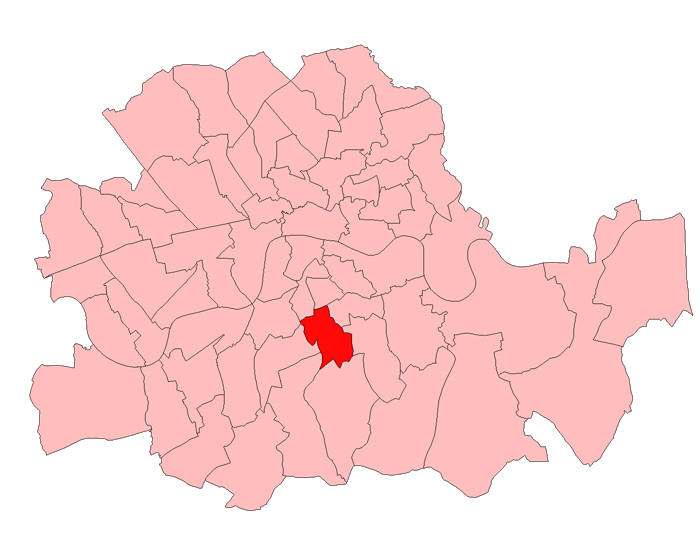
Camberwell NW in the County of London, showing boundaries used in 1929

General Election 30 May 1929: Camberwell North West Electorate 41,282
| Party | Candidate | Votes | % | ±% |
|---|---|---|---|---|
| Labour | Dr Hyacinth Bernard Morgan | 12,213 | 44.2 | +5.2 |
| Unionist | Edward Taswell Campbell | 9,808 | 35.6 | −4.2 |
| Liberal | Henry Harcourt | 5,559 | 20.2 | −1.0 |
| Majority | | 2,405 | 8.6 | +9.8 |
| Turnout | | | 66.8 | −8.0 |
| Labour gain from Unionist | | Swing | +4.9 | |

He did not stand for parliament again.
