= Harold Heathcote-Williams =

British politician and barrister

Harold Heathcote Williams QC (19 September 1896 – 15 August 1964), was a British Liberal Party politician and barrister.

== Background ==
He was the 9th son of Joseph Ellis Williams and Martha Amelia Heathcote, of Abbotsfield, Chester. He was educated at The King's School, Chester and Brasenose College, Oxford (Hulme Scholar). He received an Honours in Jurisprudence in 1922. He married, in 1940, Margaret Julian Henley. They had one son (poet, dramatist and actor John Henley Heathcote-Williams, known as 'Heathcote Williams') and one daughter.

== Career ==
He served in the European War, 1914–19, in the Royal Artillery. He was editor of Isis, 1922–23. He was a barrister, having been called to the bar, Inner Temple, in 1923. He was appointed recorder of Tiverton in 1947 serving for the next 4 years. He became a Queen's Counsel in 1949. He was Master of the Bench of The Inner Temple in 1957. He was Legal Member of Council of the Town Planning Institute

== Political career ==
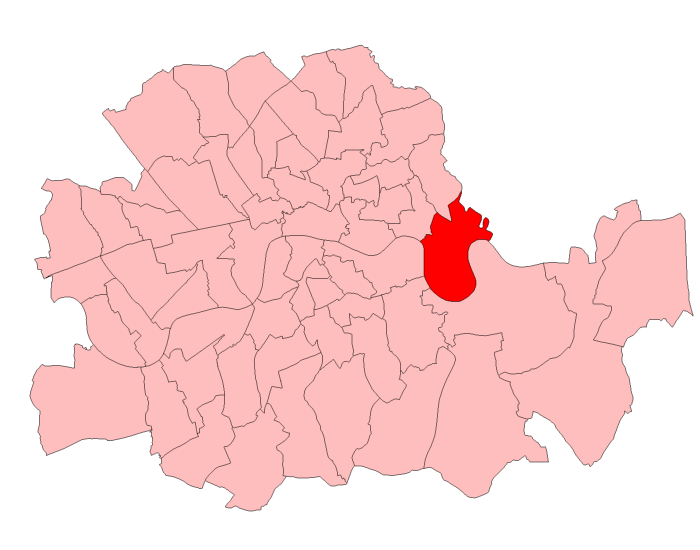
Poplar South in the County of London

He first stood as Liberal candidate at South Poplar in 1923, the first of three attempts to win the seat.

General Election 1923: Poplar, South Poplar
Party	Candidate	Votes	%	±%
Labour	Samuel March	14,537	64.8	
Liberal	Harold Heathcote Williams	7,899	35.2	
Majority		6,638	29.6	
Turnout		37,681	59.5	
Labour hold		Swing	N/A	

General Election 1924: Poplar, South Poplar
Party	Candidate	Votes	%	±%
Labour	Samuel March	16,224	62.6	
Liberal	Harold Heathcote Williams	9,709	37.4	
Majority		6,515	25.2	
Turnout		38,336	67.6	
Labour hold		Swing	-2.2	

General Election 1929: Poplar, South Poplar
Party	Candidate	Votes	%	±%
Labour	Samuel March	19,696	64.8	
Liberal	Harold Heathcote Williams	7,185	23.6	
Conservative	Elliot Marcet Gorst	3,532	11.6	
Majority		12,511	41.2	
Turnout		47,845	63.6	
Labour hold		Swing	+8.0	

He then decided to seek election to parliament elsewhere and in June 1931 was chosen by Torquay Liberal Association as their prospective parliamentary candidate. However, a National Government was formed and the party was reluctant to oppose the sitting Conservative MP. At the 1935 General Election, he did fight Knutsford, finishing second.

General Election 1935 Electorate 62,230
Party	Candidate	Votes	%	±%
Conservative	Ernest Makins	30,252	63.7	n/a
Liberal	Harold Heathcote Williams	17,253	36.3	n/a
Majority		12,999	27.4	n/a
Turnout			76.3	n/a
Conservative hold		Swing	n/a	

A General Election was expected to take place in 1939 or 1940 and Williams was again chosen by Knutsford Liberal Association as their prospective parliamentary candidate. He was actively campaigning in Knutsford, right up to the moment when war broke out. All party political activity was cut back during the war along with an Electoral truce that had been agreed by the main political parties. This meant that should their be a need to fill parliamentary vacancies, the incumbent party would not face opposition from the other parties. There was increasing dissatisfaction with this truce among both the Liberal and Labour parties which resulted in some Independent Labour or Independent Liberal candidates standing in by-elections against government candidates. Williams was one of these candidates. He contested the neighbouring Cheshire seat of Eddisbury, but polled poorly, as his own party leader Sir Archibald Sinclair publicly endorsed the government candidate;

1943 Eddisbury by-election Electorate
Party	Candidate	Votes	%	±%
Common Wealth	Warrant Off. John Eric Loverseed	8,023	43.7	n/a
National Liberal	Thomas Peacock	7,537	41.0	n/a
Independent Liberal	Harold Heathcote Williams	2,803	15.3	n/a
Majority		486	2.7	n/a
Turnout		18,363	56.1	n/a
Common Wealth gain from National Liberal		Swing	n/a	

This was Williams final parliamentary electoral contest.
