= Alfred Yeo (British politician) =

British politician

Sir Alfred William Yeo

Member of Parliament for Poplar South Poplar (1914–1918)
- In office 19 February 1914 – 26 October 1922
- Preceded by: Sydney Buxton
- Succeeded by: Samuel March

Personal details
- Born: 13 October 1863
- Died: 13 April 1928 (aged 64) Westcliff-on-Sea, Essex, England
- Party: Liberal
- Spouses: Mary Ann Brown (m. 1886; died 1911) Florence Jane Stevens (m. 1911)
- Children: 1

Sir Alfred William Yeo (13 October 1863 – 14 April 1928) was a British Liberal politician, self-made businessman and public servant.

== Family and education ==
Alfred William Yeo was the son of George Yeo, a native of the county of Devon who struggled to make a living as a house-painter. The family moved to Kent. There is conflicting evidence about Alfred's place of birth which is given as Devon in his obituary in The Times but is stated to be London in a source provided by the Yeo family. He was educated at Marner Street and High Street Schools, Bromley. In 1886, he married Mary Ann Brown. They had one son. Mary Ann Yeo died in 1911 and Alfred was married again that same year to Florence Jane Stevens from Poplar, London. In religion Yeo was a strong Nonconformist and a supporter of the National Brotherhood Federation.

== Career ==
By the end of his career, Yeo could be described as wealthy and a self-made man but he started at the very bottom. After schooling, Yeo found work in an iron foundry. He told one of the London newspapers that at the age of eleven he had had to work for 84 hours a week, or 14 hours a day, for six days a week. He later worked for thirty years in business in the music trade dealing in musical instruments, notably pianos.

== Local government service ==
Yeo immersed himself in local administration in Poplar over many years. He served as a member of the vestry, an early form of local government in London. He was later a member of the Board of Works and for nine years served as Progressive Party member for Limehouse on the London County Council. He was an elected member of the Metropolitan Borough of Poplar for 25 years. He served as a member of Poplar Board of Guardians, the body charged with administering the English Poor Laws for ten years, for six years of which he was chairman. He also worked in other areas of social and unemployment relief being for ten years Chairman of the Poplar Distress Committee, a body set up under the Unemployed Workmen Act 1905 to provide grants to create jobs. In 1903–04, Yeo was elected Mayor of Poplar.

== Parliament ==
=== Poplar ===
In February 1914, the Liberal MP for Poplar, Sydney Buxton was appointed Governor-General of South Africa and stood down from the House of Commons. For the subsequent by-election on 19 February, Yeo was selected as Liberal candidate and held the seat in a tight contest against the Conservative challenge, albeit by a small and much reduced majority. The Unionist candidate's performance was clearly given a boost by the Conservative victory in nearby Bethnal Green South West a by-election which had been caused by the resignation of Charles Masterman to become Chancellor of the Duchy of Lancaster and the result of which had declared the day before. A further reason for the small majority may have been what was reported to have been splits and disagreements in the local Liberal party with some elements having supported Sir Victor Horsley, the scientist and surgeon, as potential candidate over Yeo.

=== 1918 ===
There were boundary changes affecting Yeo's constituency for the 1918 general election and Yeo was chosen to fight the new seat of South Poplar. He contested the seat as a Coalition Liberal, having presumably been granted the Coalition coupon. He was opposed by Labour and by a candidate from the National Federation of Discharged and Demobilized Sailors and Soldiers, although this candidate, Captain Wilfrid Allen, is also described in other sources as a Conservative.

Along with John Ward, Yeo was a vocal critic of the mui-tsai system, a form of Chinese child slavery then prevalent in colonial Hong Kong.

Yeo held the seat with nearly 50% of the poll. At the 1922 general election, Yeo fought South Poplar as a National Liberal supporting outgoing prime minister David Lloyd George. In a straight fight with Labour's Samuel March however he lost the seat by the wide margin of 4,338 votes.

=== 1923-28 ===
Yeo tried to get back into Parliament at the 1923 general election when he stood for the reunified Liberal Party at the Northamptonshire seat of Kettering but he came bottom of the poll in a three-cornered contest. He did not stand for Parliament again but at the time of his death he was Liberal candidate for Romford in Essex.

== Other appointments ==
Yeo took a strong interest in education being chairman for over 20 years under the auspices of the London School Board of local schools in St Leonard's Road, Hay Currie, and Bromley Hall Road Groups. He also served as Chairman of Lord Buxton’s Committee dealing with distress during the transport workers’ dispute of 1912 and as Chairman of the London County Council Mental Hospital at Claybury. He played a part in getting the government to bring in a Bill to prevent increase of rents during War and six months thereafter and to bring in regulations for Tribunals dealing with one-man businesses to protect the livelihoods of self-employed men who were being conscripted. Yeo was also appointed as a Justice of the Peace and served for a while as Vice-Chairman of the Tower Bench. Yeo also supported a campaign led by the Duchess of Hamilton for slaughterhouse reform and spoke at a number of public meetings to demand an end to what were described as cruel methods of slaughtering animals for food and calling for the compulsory introduction of mechanically operated humane-killers.

Asked to recall his proudest moment in government or public service, Sir Alfred said this had been when the old age pension was raised from 7/6d to ten shillings largely as a consequence of his efforts.

== Honours ==
Yeo was knighted for public service in the New Year's Honours List of 1918.

== Publications ==
Yeo authored a number of political pamphlets including pamphlets, Trade After the War; On Character and The Cross and the Crossways.

== Death ==
Yeo was taken ill in December 1927, suffering from what was described as a nervous breakdown. His condition deteriorated over the following months and he died at his home at Westcliff-on-Sea on 14 April 1928.

Parliament of the United Kingdom
Preceded by Sydney Buxton	Member of Parliament for Poplar; 1914–1918	constituency abolished
New constituency	Member of Parliament for Poplar South; 1918–1922	Succeeded by Samuel March
