= John McDougall (British politician) =

British politician and businessman

Sir John McDougall
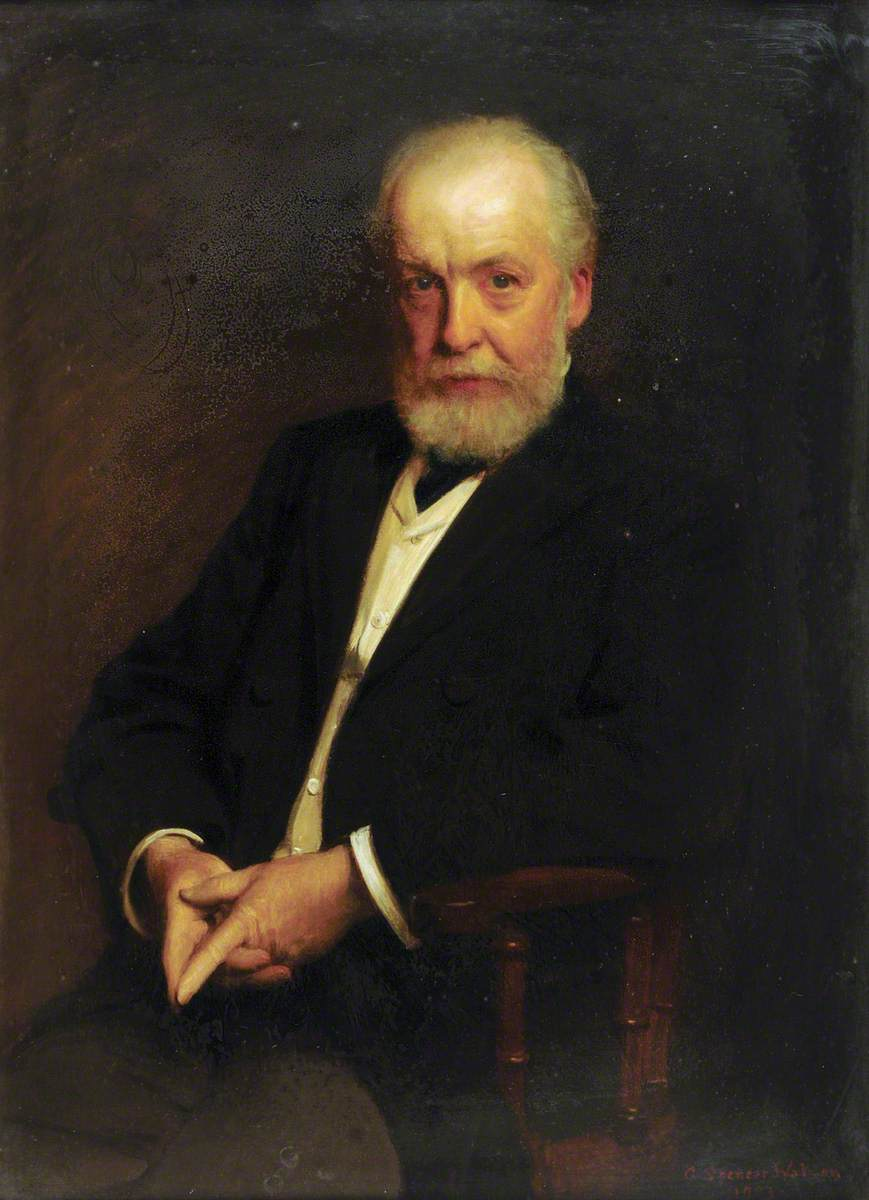
- McDougall in 1903

chair, London County Council
- In office March 1902 – March 1903

Personal details
- Born: 3 March 1844
- Died: May 8, 1917 (aged 73)
- Party: Progressive Party
- Profession: Chemist
- Known for: McDougall flour-milling

Sir John McDougall (3 March 1844 – 8 May 1917) was an English businessman (associated with the McDougall flour-milling company) and an east London politician who chaired London County Council for a year from March 1902.

== Career ==
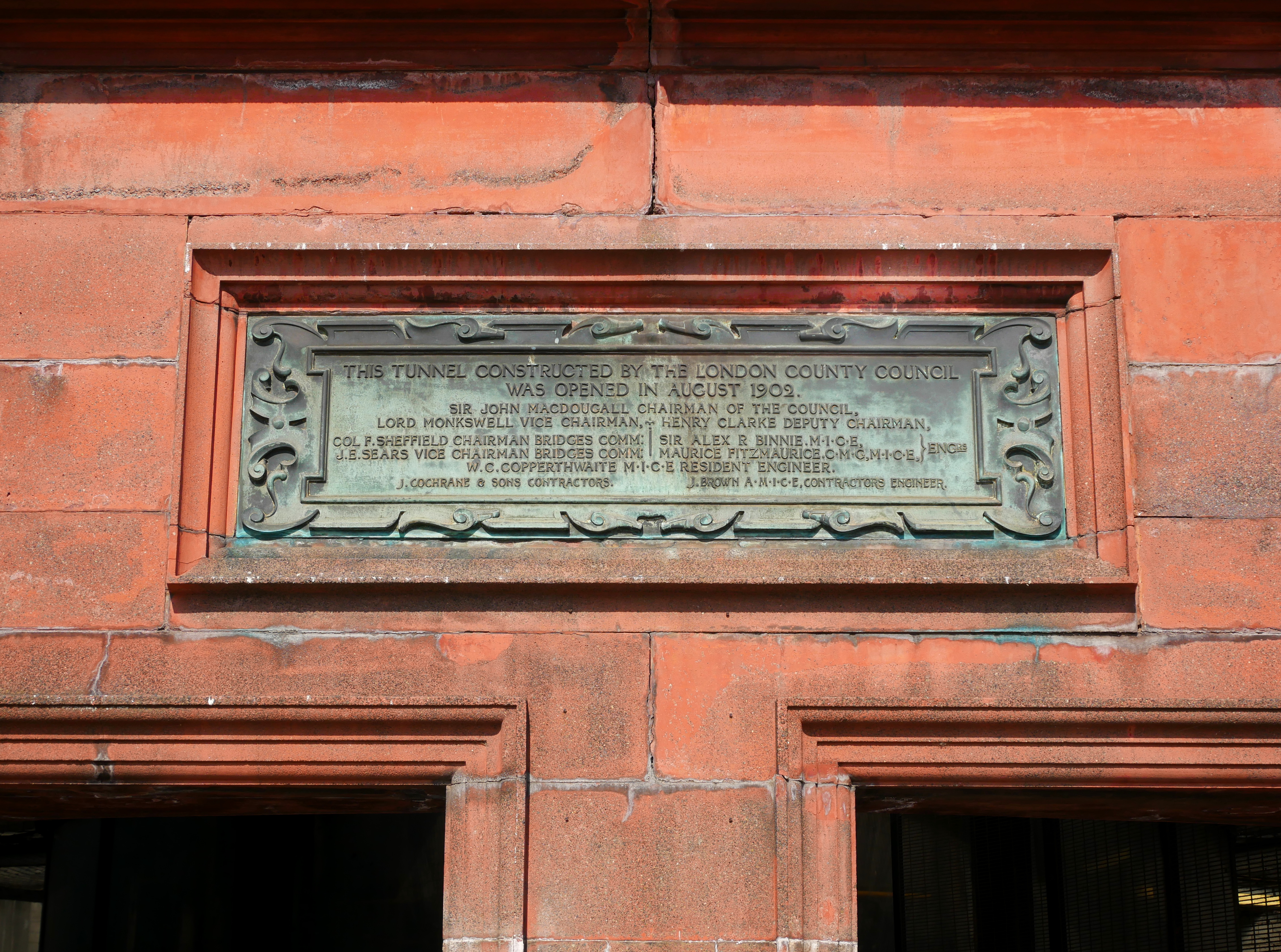
McDougall's name (misspelt as MacDougall) appears on the commemorative plaque marking the August 1902 opening of the Greenwich foot tunnel

McDougall was one of five sons of Manchester flour merchant Alexander McDougall, who, in 1845, set up as a manufacturing chemist, and in 1864 recruited his sons into the business. John McDougall, who became a Fellow of the Chemical Society, helped establish and grow the family's flour business in London, including construction in 1869 of the first Wheatsheaf Mill on the southern quay of the Millwall Outer Dock; from 1879, this became the place for manufacture of McDougalls self-raising flour. In 1899 the original mill was burnt down, but was rebuilt in 1901.

John McDougall and his brothers had been encouraged by their father to engage in charitable activities, and John eventually left the family business in 1888 to become a local councillor, focusing in particular on lunatic asylums and drains.

He was a member of the Progressive Party and was elected to London County Council, representing - with Will Crooks - the Tower Hamlets district of Poplar from 1889 to 1913. He was elected chairman of the LCC 1902-03, and, on 26 June 1902, it was announced he would be knighted as part of the Coronation Honours of King Edward VII, the knighthood being conferred in a ceremony on 24 October 1902.

He was also a prominent figure in Wesleyan Methodism, participating in a 1903 meeting announcing that London's Royal Aquarium would become the home of Wesleyanism in Great Britain.

== Family ==
McDougall married twice. His second wife was Ellen Mary Lidgett, with whom he had a son Frank Lidgett McDougall (born in Greenwich, 16 April 1884 - died 1958) who became an Australian public servant and economist.

== Legacy ==
Sir John McDougall Gardens, on the west side of the Isle of Dogs, is named after him and located close to the site of the family's flour mills, the Wheatsheaf Mill, demolished in 1980.

The McDougall's company merged with Hovis in 1957. Five years later, in 1962, Hovis-McDougall merged with Rank Ltd to form Rank Hovis McDougall, now known as RHM - today part of Premier Foods.
