= Bow and Bromley (London County Council constituency) =

London County Council constituency

- Former constituency for the London County Council

Former constituency
- Created: 1889
- Abolished: 1949
- Member(s): 2
- Replaced by: Poplar

Bow and Bromley was a constituency used for elections to the London County Council between 1889 and 1949. The seat shared boundaries with the UK Parliament constituency of the same name.

== Councillors ==
| Year | Name | Party | Name | Party |
|---|---|---|---|---|
| 1889 | Jane Cobden | Progressive | Walter Hunter | Moderate |
| 1892 | William Wallace Bruce | Labour Progressive | Ben Cooper | Labour Progressive |
| 1907 | William Stanley Macbean Knight | Municipal Reform | Henry Vincent Rowe | Municipal Reform |
| 1910 | George Lewis Bruce | Progressive | George Lansbury | Labour |
| 1913 | Frank Herbert Baber | Municipal Reform | Malcolm Hilbery | Municipal Reform |
| 1917 | Frank Herbert Baber | Municipal Reform | Walter Charles Bersey | Municipal Reform |
| 1919 | Edward Cruse | Labour | Charlie Sumner | Labour |
| 1926 | Edward Cruse | Labour | Thomas John Blacketer | Labour |
| 1934 | Edward Cruse | Labour | Ethel Mary Lambert | Labour |
| 1938 | Thomas John Goodway | Labour | Ethel Mary Lambert | Labour |
| 1945 | Thomas John Goodway | Labour | Edward Heslop Smith | Labour |
| 1946 | Lilian Maud Sadler | Labour | Edward Heslop Smith | Labour |

== Election results ==
1889 London County Council election: Bow and Bromley
| Party | Candidate | Votes | % | ±% |
|---|---|---|---|---|
| Moderate | Walter Hunter | 2,159 | | |
| Progressive | Jane Cobden | 2,045 | | |
| Progressive | Edward Rider Cook | 1,722 | | |
| Moderate | James Henry Howard | 1,561 | | |
| Moderate win (new seat) | | | | |
| Progressive win (new seat) | | | | |

1892 London County Council election: Bow and Bromley
| Party | Candidate | Votes | % | ±% |
|---|---|---|---|---|
| Labour Progressive | William Wallace Bruce | 3,467 | | |
| Labour Progressive | Ben Cooper | 3,467 | | |
| Moderate | Richard Whieldon Barnett | 1,381 | | |
| Moderate | Herman Joseph Lescher | 1,368 | | |
| Independent | Alfred Samuel Bird | 244 | | |
| Labour Progressive gain from Moderate | | Swing | | |
| Labour Progressive hold | | Swing | | |

1895 London County Council election: Bow and Bromley
| Party | Candidate | Votes | % | ±% |
|---|---|---|---|---|
| Progressive | William Wallace Bruce | 2,919 | | |
| Progressive | Ben Cooper | 2,906 | | |
| Moderate | L. H. Hayter | 2,407 | | |
| Moderate | W. Tomlinson | 2,400 | | |
| Progressive hold | | Swing | | |
| Progressive hold | | Swing | | |

1898 London County Council election: Bow and Bromley
| Party | Candidate | Votes | % | ±% |
|---|---|---|---|---|
| Progressive | William Wallace Bruce | 3,082 | | |
| Progressive | Ben Cooper | 3,018 | | |
| Moderate | Valentine John Hussey Walsh | 2,112 | | |
| Moderate | A. A'Beckett Terrell | 1,992 | | |
| Progressive hold | | Swing | | |
| Progressive hold | | Swing | | |

1901 London County Council election: Bow and Bromley
| Party | Candidate | Votes | % | ±% |
|---|---|---|---|---|
| Progressive | Ben Cooper | unopposed | n/a | n/a |
| Progressive | William Wallace Bruce | unopposed | n/a | n/a |
| Progressive hold | | Swing | n/a | |
| Progressive hold | | Swing | n/a | |

1904 London County Council election: Bow and Bromley
| Party | Candidate | Votes | % | ±% |
|---|---|---|---|---|
| Progressive | William Wallace Bruce | 3,420 | | |
| Progressive | Ben Cooper | 3,398 | | |
| Conservative | H. C. Bachelor | 1,600 | | |
| Conservative | B. Levett | 1,596 | | |
| Progressive hold | | Swing | n/a | |
| Progressive hold | | Swing | n/a | |

1907 London County Council election: Bow and Bromley
| Party | Candidate | Votes | % | ±% |
|---|---|---|---|---|
| Municipal Reform | William Stanley Macbean Knight | 3,285 | | |
| Municipal Reform | Horace Victor Rowe | 3,212 | | |
| Progressive | William Wallace Bruce | 3,019 | | |
| Progressive | Ben Cooper | 3,019 | | |
| Social Democratic Federation | Alf Watts | 786 | | |
| Social Democratic Federation | John Stokes | 783 | | |
| Independent | J. S. Bird | 159 | | |
| Majority | | | | |
| Municipal Reform gain from Progressive | | Swing | | |
| Municipal Reform gain from Progressive | | Swing | | |

1910 London County Council election: Bow and Bromley
| Party | Candidate | Votes | % | ±% |
|---|---|---|---|---|
| Labour | George Lansbury | 4,002 | | |
| Progressive | George Lewis Bruce | 3,442 | | |
| Municipal Reform | Horace Victor Rowe | 2,507 | | |
| Municipal Reform | Alfred Moor-Radford | 2,395 | | |
| Majority | | | | |
| Labour gain from Municipal Reform | | Swing | | |
| Progressive gain from Municipal Reform | | Swing | | |

1913 London County Council election: Bow and Bromley
| Party | Candidate | Votes | % | ±% |
|---|---|---|---|---|
| Municipal Reform | Frank Herbert Baber | 2,505 | | |
| Municipal Reform | Malcolm Hilbery | 2,464 | | |
| Progressive | George Lewis Bruce | 1,936 | | |
| Progressive | Ben Cooper | 1,826 | | |
| British Socialist Party | Charlie Sumner | 1,794 | | |
| British Socialist Party | Edwin C. Fairchild | 1,609 | | |
| Independent | Frederick John William Leaney | 79 | | |
| Majority | | | | |
| Municipal Reform gain from Labour | | Swing | | |
| Municipal Reform gain from Progressive | | Swing | | |

1919 London County Council election: Bow and Bromley
| Party | Candidate | Votes | % | ±% |
|---|---|---|---|---|
| Labour | Charlie Sumner | 3,461 | | |
| Labour | Edward Cruse | 3,169 | | |
| Independent | W. H. Hunt | 1,224 | 21.6 | |
| Municipal Reform | Herbert Williams | 1,193 | | |
| Municipal Reform | Malcolm Campbell-Johnston | 1,061 | | |
| Majority | | | | |
| Labour gain from Municipal Reform | | Swing | | |
| Labour gain from Municipal Reform | | Swing | | |

1922 London County Council election: Bow and Bromley
| Party | Candidate | Votes | % | ±% |
|---|---|---|---|---|
| Labour | Charlie Sumner | 8,121 | 31.9 | |
| Labour | Edward Cruse | 8,043 | 31.6 | |
| Municipal Reform | Florence Barrie Lambert | 4,721 | 18.5 | |
| Municipal Reform | A. Barnard | 4,599 | 18.0 | |
| Majority | | 3,322 | 13.1 | |
| Labour hold | | Swing | | |
| Labour hold | | Swing | | |

1925 London County Council election: Bow and Bromley
| Party | Candidate | Votes | % | ±% |
|---|---|---|---|---|
| Labour | Charlie Sumner | 8,797 | | |
| Labour | Edward Cruse | 8,645 | | |
| Municipal Reform | H. A. Hill | 4,685 | | |
| Municipal Reform | A. E. Phelps | 4,397 | | |
| Majority | | | | |
| Labour hold | | Swing | | |
| Labour hold | | Swing | | |

Bow and Bromley by-election, 1926
| Party | Candidate | Votes | % | ±% |
|---|---|---|---|---|
| Labour | Thomas John Blacketer | Unopposed | N/A | N/A |
| Labour hold | | Swing | N/A | |

1928 London County Council election: Bow and Bromley
| Party | Candidate | Votes | % | ±% |
|---|---|---|---|---|
| Labour | Edward Cruse | 8,519 | | |
| Labour | Thomas John Blacketer | 8,260 | | |
| Municipal Reform | H. A. Hill | 3,390 | | |
| Municipal Reform | E. Mudge | 3,222 | | |
| Independent | B. Hanson | 472 | | |
| Majority | | | | |
| Labour hold | | Swing | | |
| Labour hold | | Swing | | |

1931 London County Council election: Bow and Bromley
| Party | Candidate | Votes | % | ±% |
|---|---|---|---|---|
| Labour | Edward Cruse | 6,367 | | |
| Labour | Thomas John Blacketer | 6,333 | | |
| Municipal Reform | E. Gorst | 2,045 | | |
| Municipal Reform | F. S. C. Head | 2,012 | | |
| Majority | | | | |
| Labour hold | | Swing | | |
| Labour hold | | Swing | | |

1934 London County Council election: Bow and Bromley
| Party | Candidate | Votes | % | ±% |
|---|---|---|---|---|
| Labour | Edward Cruse | 9,266 | | |
| Labour | Ethel Mary Lambert | 9,019 | | |
| Municipal Reform | G. G. Baker | 1,656 | | |
| Municipal Reform | Sophia Jevons | 1,644 | | |
| Majority | | | | |
| Labour hold | | Swing | | |
| Labour hold | | Swing | | |

1937 London County Council election: Bow and Bromley
| Party | Candidate | Votes | % | ±% |
|---|---|---|---|---|
| Labour | Edward Cruse | 8,669 | | |
| Labour | Ethel Mary Lambert | 8,480 | | |
| Municipal Reform | W. Henderson | 2,459 | | |
| Municipal Reform | T. M. Hardy | 2,243 | | |
| Majority | | | | |
| Labour hold | | Swing | | |
| Labour hold | | Swing | | |

Bow and Bromley by-election, 1938
| Party | Candidate | Votes | % | ±% |
|---|---|---|---|---|
| Labour | Thomas John Goodway | Unopposed | N/A | N/A |
| Labour hold | | Swing | N/A | |

1946 London County Council election: Bow and Bromley
| Party | Candidate | Votes | % | ±% |
|---|---|---|---|---|
| Labour | Lilian Sadler | Unopposed | N/A | N/A |
| Labour | Edward Heslop Smith | Unopposed | N/A | N/A |
| Majority | | | | |
| Labour hold | | Swing | | |
| Labour hold | | Swing | | |
