= Poplar (UK Parliament constituency) =

Former parliamentary constituency in the United Kingdom

- Former borough constituency for the House of Commons
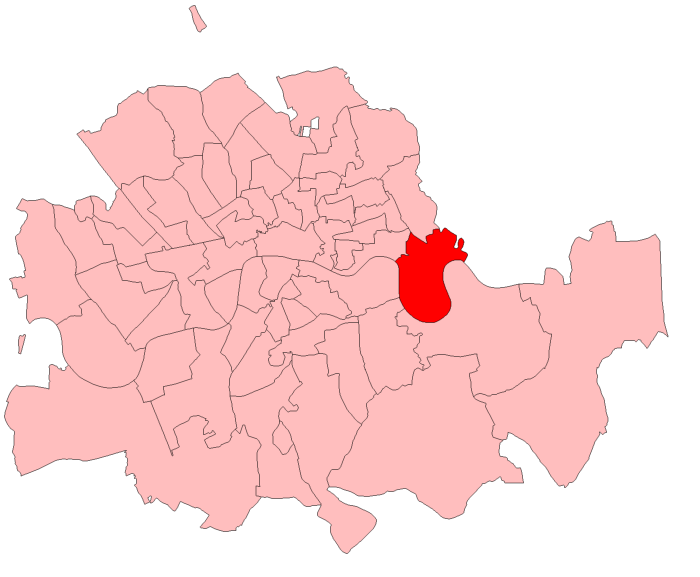
- Poplar in London, 1885-1918

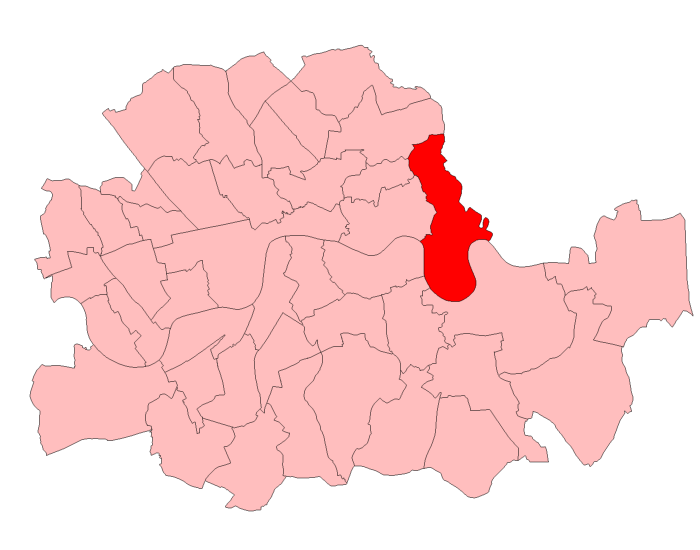
- Poplar in London, 1950-74

1885–1918
- Seats: one
- Created from: Tower Hamlets
- Replaced by: Poplar South

1950–1974
- Seats: one
- Created from: Bow and Bromley and Poplar South
- Replaced by: Stepney and Poplar

Poplar was a parliamentary constituency centred on the Poplar district in London. It returned one Member of Parliament (MP) to the House of Commons of the Parliament of the United Kingdom.

== History ==
The constituency was created for the 1885 general election, and abolished for the 1918 general election, when with very minor boundary changes it was replaced by the new constituency of Poplar South. A small amount of the constituency's territory was added to Bow and Bromley.

It was re-established for the 1950 general election, and abolished again for the February 1974 general election. It was then partly replaced by the new Stepney and Poplar constituency.

== Boundaries ==

1885–1918: In 1885 the area was administered as part of the county of Middlesex. It was located in the Tower division, in the east of the historic county. The suburban neighbourhood of Poplar formed a division of the parliamentary borough of Tower Hamlets.

In 1889 the Tower division of Middlesex was severed from the county, for administrative purposes. It became part of the County of London. In 1900 the lower tier of local government in London was re-modelled. Poplar constituency became part of the Metropolitan Borough of Poplar.

1950–1974: When a re-distribution of parliamentary seats took effect in 1950, the constituency was re-created. It then included the whole of the Metropolitan Borough of Poplar.

In 1965 the Metropolitan Borough was incorporated in the London Borough of Tower Hamlets in Greater London.

== Members of Parliament ==
Election	Member	Party
1885	Henry Green	Liberal
1886	Sydney Buxton	Liberal
1914 b-e	Alfred Yeo	Liberal
1918	constituency abolished: see Poplar South & Bow and Bromley	
1950	constituency re-created	
1950	Charles Key	Labour
1964	Ian Mikardo	Labour
Feb 1974	constituency abolished: see Stepney and Poplar	

== Election results ==
=== Elections in the 1880s ===
General election 1885: Tower Hamlets, Poplar
Party	Candidate	Votes	%	±%
Liberal	Henry Green	4,090	65.9	
Conservative	Denzil Onslow	2,113	34.1	
Majority		1,977	31.8	
Turnout		6,203	68.6	
Registered electors		9,041		
Liberal win (new seat)				

Sydney Buxton

General election 1886: Tower Hamlets, Poplar
Party	Candidate	Votes	%	±%
Liberal	Sydney Buxton	2,903	50.7	−15.2
Conservative	Alfred Welby	2,827	49.3	+15.2
Majority		76	1.4	−30.4
Turnout		5,730	63.4	−5.2
Registered electors		9,041		
Liberal hold		Swing	-15.2	

=== Elections in the 1890s ===
General election 1892: Tower Hamlets, Poplar
Party	Candidate	Votes	%	±%
Liberal	Sydney Buxton	5,007	62.7	+12.0
Conservative	Alfred Welby	2,975	37.3	−12.0
Majority		2,032	25.4	+24.0
Turnout		7,982	77.1	+13.7
Registered electors		10,348		
Liberal hold		Swing	+12.0	

General election 1895: Tower Hamlets, Poplar
Party	Candidate	Votes	%	±%
Liberal	Sydney Buxton	3,939	55.9	−6.8
Conservative	William Pelham Bullivant	3,110	44.1	+6.8
Majority		829	11.8	−13.6
Turnout		7,049	72.8	−4.3
Registered electors		9,684		
Liberal hold		Swing	-6.8	

=== Elections in the 1900s ===
General election 1900: Tower Hamlets, Poplar
Party	Candidate	Votes	%	±%
Liberal	Sydney Buxton	3,992	58.4	+2.5
Conservative	William Pelham Bullivant	2,840	41.6	−2.5
Majority		1,152	16.8	+5.0
Turnout		6,832	68.3	−4.5
Registered electors		10,009		
Liberal hold		Swing	+2.5	

General election 1906: Tower Hamlets, Poplar
Party	Candidate	Votes	%	±%
Liberal	Sydney Buxton	4,546	67.0	+8.6
Conservative	George Borwick	2,235	33.0	−8.6
Majority		2,311	34.0	+17.2
Turnout		6,781	74.6	+6.3
Registered electors		9,088		
Liberal hold		Swing	+8.6	

=== Elections in the 1910s ===
General election January 1910: Tower Hamlets, Poplar
Party	Candidate	Votes	%	±%
Liberal	Sydney Buxton	4,172	57.2	−9.8
Conservative	Leslie Wilson	3,125	42.8	+9.8
Majority		1,047	14.4	−19.6
Turnout		7,297	82.4	+7.8
Registered electors		8,857		
Liberal hold		Swing	-9.8	

General election December 1910: Tower Hamlets, Poplar
Party	Candidate	Votes	%	±%
Liberal	Sydney Buxton	3,977	64.9	+7.7
Conservative	Ellis Ashmead-Bartlett	2,148	35.1	−7.7
Majority		1,829	29.8	+15.4
Turnout		6,125	69.2	−13.2
Registered electors		8,857		
Liberal hold		Swing	+7.7	

Alfred Yeo

1914 Poplar by-election
Party	Candidate	Votes	%	±%
Liberal	Alfred Yeo	3,548	46.0	−18.9
Conservative	Robin S. Kerr-Clark	3,270	42.4	+7.3
British Socialist Party	Jack Jones	893	11.6	New
Majority		278	3.6	−26.2
Turnout		7,711	79.8	+10.6
Registered electors		9,658		
Liberal hold		Swing	-13.1	

=== Elections in the 1950s ===
General election 1950: Poplar
Party	Candidate	Votes	%	±%
Labour	Charles Key	30,756	78.23	
Conservative	Richard Lonsdale	6,088	15.48	
Liberal	Joseph Frederick Purkis	1,933	4.92	
Communist	Harry Watson	540	1.37	
Majority		24,668	62.74	
Turnout		39,317	78.39	
Registered electors		50,154		
Labour win (new seat)				

General election 1951: Poplar
Party	Candidate	Votes	%	±%
Labour	Charles Key	31,377	82.03	+3.80
Conservative	Peter Emery	6,875	17.97	+2.49
Majority		24,502	64.06	+1.32
Turnout		38,252	75.73	−2.66
Registered electors		50,509		
Labour hold		Swing	+0.66	

General election 1955: Poplar
Party	Candidate	Votes	%	±%
Labour	Charles Key	25,642	81.52	−0.51
Conservative	Gerard Vaughan	5,814	18.48	+0.51
Majority		19,828	63.04	−1.02
Turnout		31,456	64.15	−11.58
Registered electors		49,038		
Labour hold		Swing	-0.51	

General election 1959: Poplar
Party	Candidate	Votes	%	±%
Labour	Charles Key	22,506	77.23	−4.29
Conservative	Peter Blair Black	6,635	22.77	+4.29
Majority		15,871	54.46	−8.57
Turnout		29,141	65.62	+1.58
Registered electors		44,412		
Labour hold		Swing	-4.29	

=== Elections in the 1960s ===
General election 1964: Poplar
Party	Candidate	Votes	%	±%
Labour	Ian Mikardo	20,271	77.71	+0.48
Conservative	Kenneth Baker	5,813	22.29	−0.48
Majority		14,458	55.42	+0.96
Turnout		26,084	58.28	−7.34
Registered electors		44,756		
Labour hold		Swing	+0.48	

General election 1966: Poplar
Party	Candidate	Votes	%	±%
Labour	Ian Mikardo	21,071	84.51	+6.80
Conservative	Roger Holloway	3,863	15.49	−6.80
Majority		17,208	69.02	+13.60
Turnout		24,934	57.67	−0.61
Registered electors		43,236		
Labour hold		Swing	+6.80	

=== Elections in the 1970s ===
General election 1970: Poplar
Party	Candidate	Votes	%	±%
Labour	Ian Mikardo	16,520	80.37	−4.14
Conservative	Ronald C Denney	4,036	19.63	+4.14
Majority		12,484	60.74	−8.28
Turnout		20,556	49.05	−8.62
Registered electors		41,908		
Labour hold		Swing	-4.14	
