= Edgar Lansbury (politician) =

British politician (1887–1935)

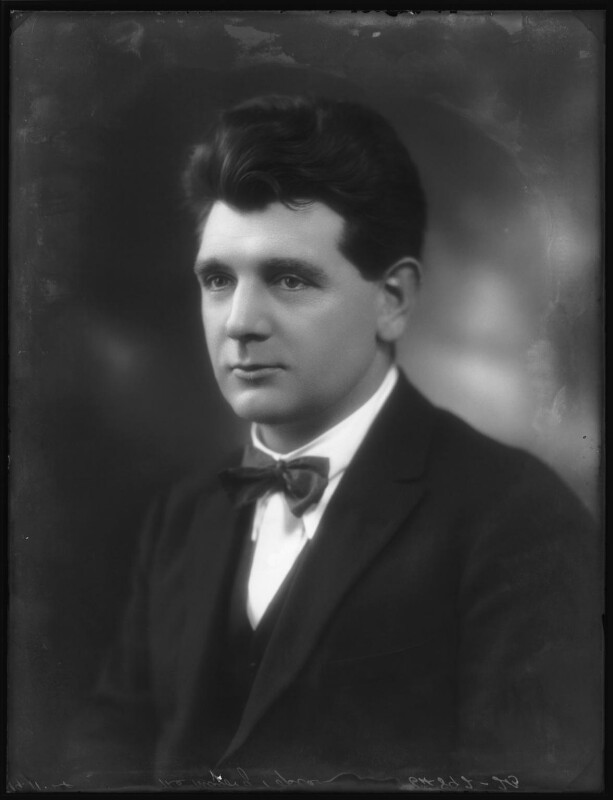
- Lansbury in 1924

Mayor of Poplar
- In office 1924–1925
- Preceded by: Charles Key
- Succeeded by: Joseph Hammond

Councillor of Poplar Borough Council
- In office 1912–1925
- Preceded by: Unknown
- Succeeded by: Vacancy after resignation

Personal details
- Born: Edgar Isaac Lansbury; 3 April 1887 England
- Died: 28 May 1935 (aged 48)
- Party: Communist Party of Great Britain
- Other political affiliations: Labour Party
- Spouse(s): Minnie Glassman (m. 1914; died 1922) Moyna Macgill (m. 1924)
- Children: Angela; Bruce; Edgar
- Parent: George Lansbury (father)
- Occupation: Politician

Edgar Isaac Lansbury (3 April 1887 – 28 May 1935) was a British Communist politician. His daughter was the actress Angela Lansbury.

== Life and career ==
Lansbury was the son of Elizabeth (née Brine) and politician George Lansbury, who was leader of the Labour Party during the 1930s. He grew up in Poplar in London, and joined the Civil Service at a young age. In 1910, he left to set up with his brother William Arthur Lansbury and friend Louis Coleman as timber merchants, using a loan of £1,000 to launch the business.

Lansbury was elected to Poplar Council in 1912, serving alongside his father. He represented both the Labour Party and (after its foundation in 1920) the Communist Party of Great Britain (CPGB). Later that same year, he worked on his father's campaign for Parliamentary re-election, after resignation over the issue, on a radical platform of women's suffrage at the Bow and Bromley by-election. He also supported Sylvia Pankhurst's East London Federation of Suffragettes, serving as Honorary Treasurer in 1915.

In 1917 he became liable to call-up for military service, and an initial application for exemption as a conscientious objector was refused, but the refusal was overturned by the London County Military Service Appeal Tribunal.

In 1921, Lansbury was one of 30 Poplar councillors to be jailed as a result of the Poplar Rates Rebellion, while, in 1924, he was elected as a substitute member of the CPGB's Central Committee. After his first wife Minnie Lansbury died in 1922, he married actress Moyna Macgill and the two moved to Regent's Park. From 1924 to 1925 he served as Mayor of Poplar, the country's second Communist mayor after Joe Vaughan. He left the Council in 1925, the same year that his first child, the future actress, Angela Lansbury, was born. Subsequent twin sons, Bruce and Edgar Jr (born 1930), later became prominent film and television producers and writers.

In 1927, the Lansburys' timber firm was declared bankrupt. In 1934, Lansbury wrote George Lansbury, My Father. In the work he inadvertently quoted from confidential documents his father had allowed him to see. He was found to have contravened section 2 of the Official Secrets Act 1911, and fined; his book was recalled in order for the text to be censored. He died on 28 May 1935, at home, 7 Weymouth Avenue, Mill Hill, leaving an estate valued for probate at £7,956.

== Publications by Lansbury ==
- Poplarism; The Truth about the Poplar Scale Relief and the Action of the Ministry of Health (1924) Not active
- George Lansbury, My Father (1934)

== Sources ==
- Janine Booth, "Guilty and Proud of it – Poplar's Rebel Councillors and Guardians 1919-1925", Merlin Press, 2009.

Party political offices
Preceded by Evelina Haverfield	Honorary Treasurer of the East London Federation of Suffragettes; 1915	Succeeded by Norah Smyth
Civic offices
Preceded by Charles Key	Mayor of Poplar; 1924–1925	Succeeded by Joseph Hammond
