= Moyna Macgill =

British and Irish actress (1895–1975)

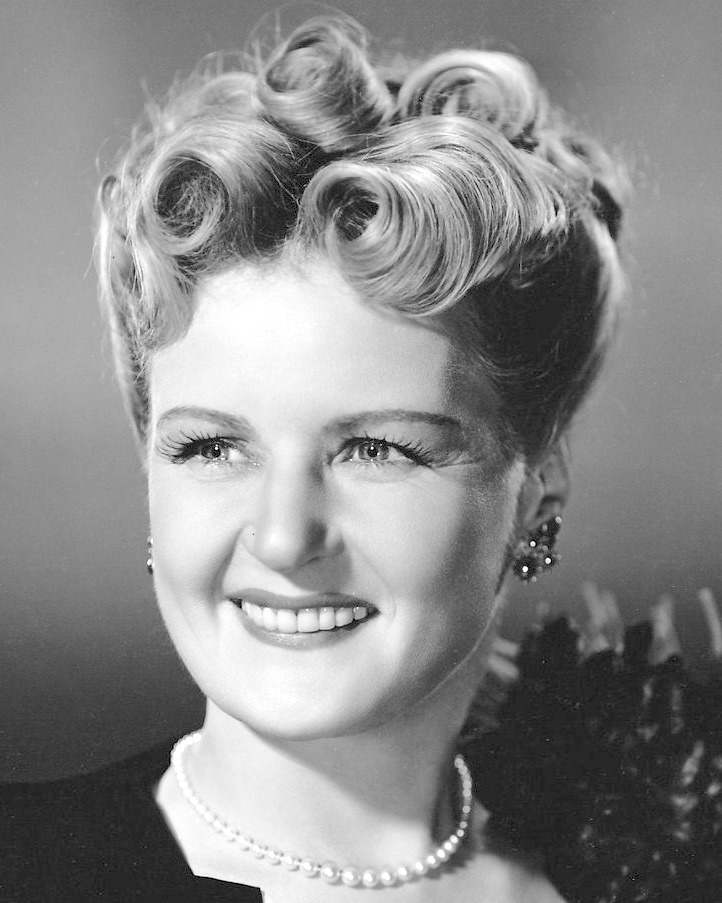
- Macgill in 1945
- Born: Charlotte Lillian McIldowie; 10 December 1895; Belfast, Northern Ireland
- Died: 25 November 1975 (aged 79); Los Angeles, California, U.S.
- Occupation: Actress
- Years active: 1920–1964
- Spouses: Reginald Denham (m. 1919; div. 1924) Edgar Lansbury (m. 1924; died 1935)
- Children: Isolde Denham; Dame Angela Lansbury; Bruce Lansbury; Edgar Lansbury
- Relatives: Tamara Ustinov (granddaughter); Malcolm Turnbull (second cousin once removed)

Moyna Macgill (born Charlotte Lillian McIldowie; 10 December 1895 – 25 November 1975) was a Northern Irish actress from Belfast and the mother of actress Angela Lansbury and producers Edgar and Bruce Lansbury. In 2020, she was listed at number 35 on The Irish Times' list of Ireland's greatest film actors.

== Early life ==
Born Charlotte Lillian McIldowie at 42 Eglantine Avenue in south Belfast, she was the daughter of William McIldowie and Elizabeth Jane (née Mageean). Her father was a wealthy solicitor of Scottish parentage who was a director of the Grand Opera House in Belfast, a position that sparked her interest in theatrics.

== Career ==
As a teenager she was noticed riding the London Underground by director and producer George Pearson, who cast her in several of his films. In 1918, she made her stage debut in the play Love is a Cottage at the Globe Theatre. Encouraged by Gerald du Maurier to change her name to Moyna Macgill (which invariably was misspelled as "MacGill" or "McGill", and on at least one occasion, the film Texas, Brooklyn & Heaven, as "Magill"), she became a leading actress of the day, appearing in light comedies, melodramas, and classics opposite Herbert Marshall, John Gielgud, and Basil Rathbone, among others.

Twenty-six-year-old Macgill was married with a three-year-old daughter, Isolde (who later married Sir Peter Ustinov), when she became involved romantically with Edgar Lansbury, a socialist politician, who was a son of the Labour MP and Leader of the Opposition George Lansbury. Her husband, actor Reginald Denham, named Lansbury as co-respondent when he filed for divorce. A year after it was finalized, Macgill and Lansbury married and with Isolde settled into a garden flat in London's Regent's Park.

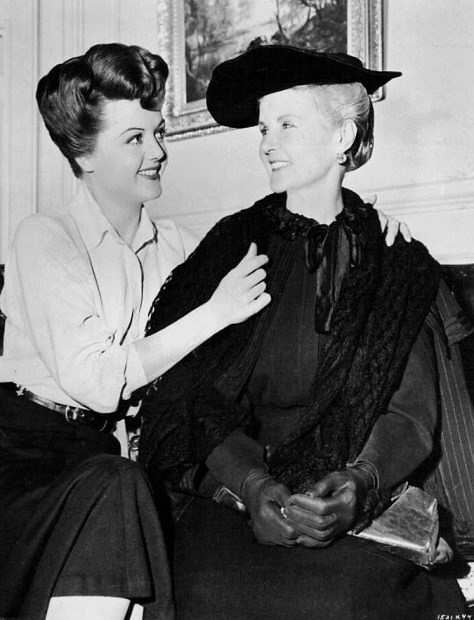
With her daughter Angela Lansbury (1951)

Macgill temporarily set aside her career following the birth of daughter Angela and twin sons Edgar, Jr., and Bruce (both went on to become Broadway producers, but Bruce is better known for his work on television, such as the series The Wild Wild West, Mission: Impossible, and his sister's Murder, She Wrote), although music and dance were prevalent in their upbringing. When they moved into a larger house in suburban Mill Hill, she turned their home into a salon for actors, writers, directors, musicians, and artists, all of whom left an impression on young Angela and were instrumental in directing her interests towards acting.

== Family ==
MacGill was born Charlotte Lilian McIldowie in Belfast on 10 December 1895 to William McIldowie (a solicitor) and Elizabeth Jane McIldowie (nee Mageean) of 42 Eglantine Avenue.

MacGill's daughter Angela Lansbury, after having featured in a number of musicals from 1940 to the 1960s, would become a popular stage and film actress in her own right, starring in the long-running television series Murder, She Wrote.

In 1935, Edgar Lansbury died of stomach cancer, a year after publishing a biography of his father George. Macgill began an affair with Scotsman Leckie Forbes, a former colonel with the British Army in India. The two moved their respective families to a house in Hampstead, but Macgill soon discovered Forbes' military career had made him a staunch disciplinarian who ruled the household like a tyrant.

When the opportunity to take her children to the U.S. presented itself just prior to The Blitz, she spirited them away under cover of night. She never spoke to Forbes again. In New York City, Macgill was unable to work in movies or on the stage, not having a work visa, and she took to presenting dramatic readings at private schools for income.

In 1942, she was invited to join a troupe that was rehearsing Noël Coward's Tonight at 8.30 for a touring production designed to raise funds for the Royal Canadian Air Force. She accepted, and when the company finished the run in Vancouver, she headed to Hollywood to seek work there. She soon sent for Angela, and eventually, the twins and the family settled in Laurel Canyon.

== Hollywood career ==
Her career in Hollywood consisted largely of small character parts in films and on television. Among her more notable film credits are Frenchman's Creek and The Picture of Dorian Gray (which co-starred her daughter Angela). In later years she made guest appearances on such television series as Studio One, The Twilight Zone, Dr. Kildare, Mister Ed and My Favorite Martian.

== Death ==
She died of esophageal cancer in Los Angeles, aged 79.

== Roles ==
=== Film ===
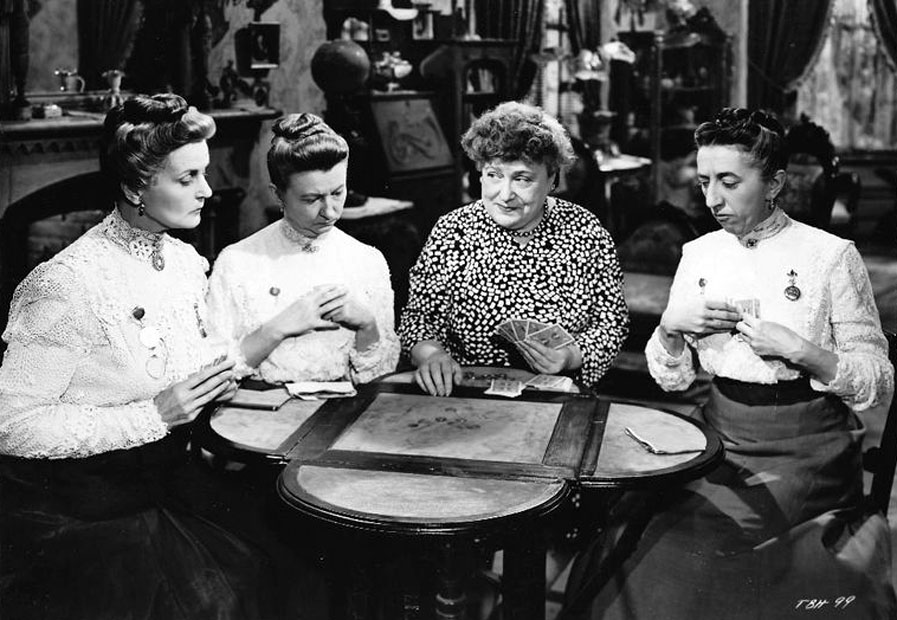
Moyna MacGill, Irene Ryan, Florence Bates and Margaret Hamilton, in Texas, Brooklyn & Heaven (1948)

Year	Title	Role	Notes
1920	Garryowen	Violet Grimshaw	
1920	Nothing Else Matters	Margery Rose	
1923	Should a Doctor Tell?	Woman on the Rack	
1924	Miriam Rozella	Miriam Rozella	
1928	Pygmalion	Woman Bystander	Uncredited
1943	Forever and a Day	Woman in Air Raid Shelter	Uncredited
1943	Jane Eyre	Dowager	Uncredited
1944	The Uninvited	Mrs. Coatsworthy	Uncredited
1944	Frenchman's Creek	Lady Godolphin	
1944	National Velvet	Woman	Uncredited
1944	Winged Victory	Mrs. Gardner	Uncredited
1945	The Picture of Dorian Gray	Duchess	
1945	The Clock	Luncheonette Lady	Uncredited
1945	The Strange Affair of Uncle Harry	Hester Quincy	
1945	The Sailor Takes a Wife	Irate Woman	Uncredited
1946	Black Beauty	Mrs. Blake	
1947	Green Dolphin Street	Mrs. Metivier	
1948	Three Daring Daughters	Mrs. Smith	
1948	Texas, Brooklyn & Heaven	Pearl Cheever	
1949	Private Angelo	Marchesa Dolce	
1951	Kind Lady	Mrs. Harkley	
1951	Bride of the Gorilla	Mme. Van Heusen	
1952	Les Misérables	Nun	Uncredited
1964	The Unsinkable Molly Brown	Lady Prindale	Uncredited
1964	My Fair Lady	Lady Boxington	Uncredited (final film role)

=== Stage ===
- The Way (1928)
