= John Senter =

British barrister and wartime intelligence officer (1905–1966)

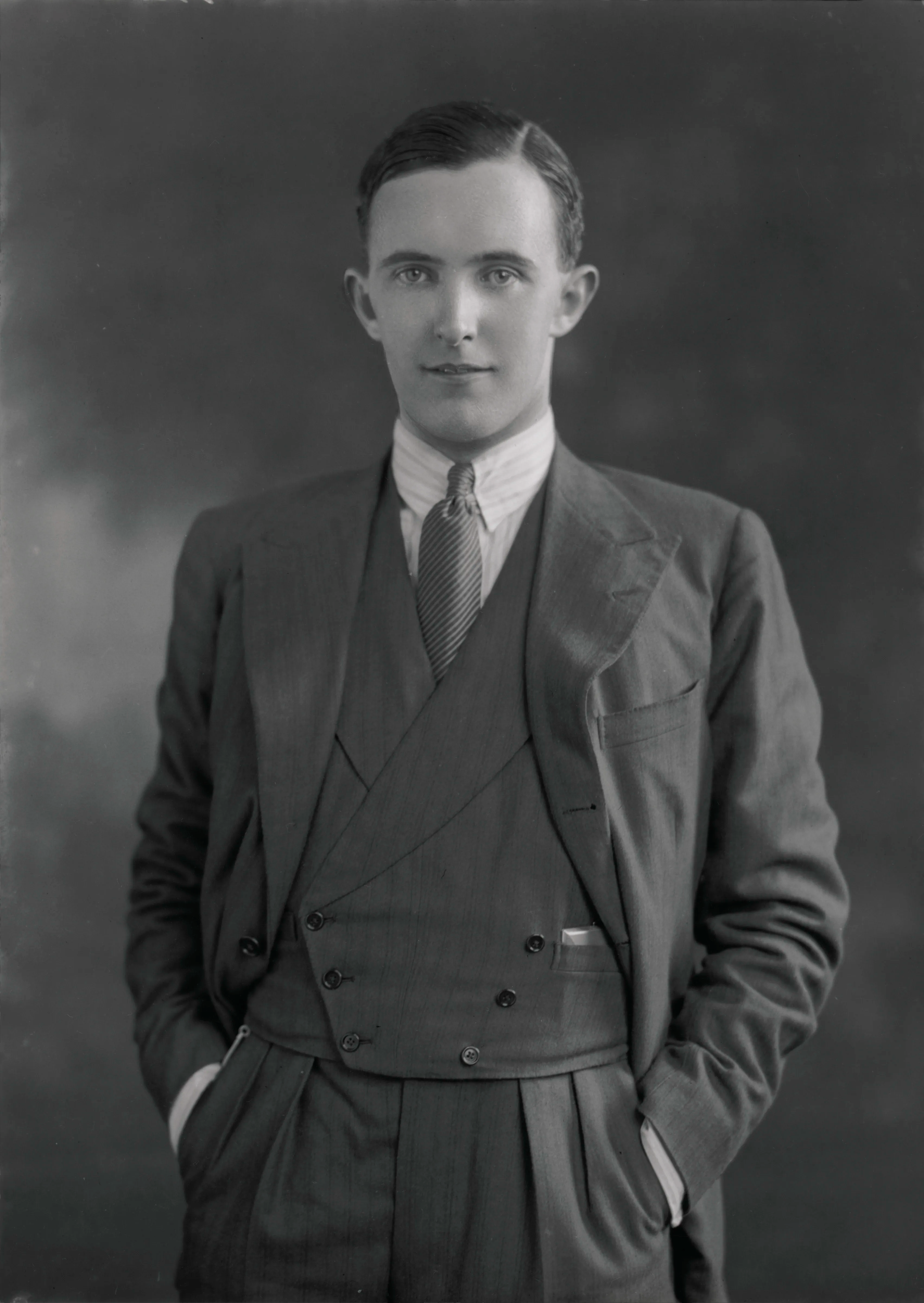
Senter in 1928

Sir John Watt Senter, QC (27 May 1905 – 14 July 1966) was a British barrister and wartime intelligence officer.

== Early life and education ==
John Watt Senter was born on 27 May 1905 to John Watt Senter, a surgeon from Edinburgh who died during the First World War, and his wife Kate Cockburn, née McIntyre. He was educated at University of Edinburgh, where he was the Vans Dunlop Law Scholar, graduating with a Master of Arts (MA) degree and a Bachelor of Law (LLB) degree.

== Career ==
=== Law ===
In 1928, Senter was called to the bar at the Middle Temple. He worked in Leicester until 1935, when he joined the chambers of the barrister Valentine Holmes (later Sir Valentine Holmes); Senter's legal career was interrupted by the Second World War: he served between 1940 and 1945, when he returned to his legal practice; he took silk in 1953. He was also the Deputy Chairman of the Northern Assurance Company for two years from 1951, and a Member of the Bar Council (1954–58) and its treasurer from 1956 to 1958, the year he was invested as a Knight Bachelor. In 1960, he became a Master of the Bench at the Middle Temple.

=== Wartime service ===
In 1940 Senter was appointed a Civilian Assistant to the War Office's General Staff. The next year he was then appointed a Temporary Lieutenant in the Royal Naval Volunteer Reserve working in the Naval Intelligence Division. He was posted to the Special Operations Executive as Deputy Head of Security with responsibility for liaising with MI5; he later became Head of Security. He was invalided out of the SEO in 1945 as a Commander.

== Personal life ==
Senter was married twice, firstly in 1928 to Frances Knight Brand, and secondly in 1961 to Anne Caroline Jarvis. His first marriage ended in divorce in 1961 and both were childless. He died on 14 July 1966.
