= Diana Spearman =

British writer and activist (1905–1991)

Diana Violet Constance Edith Spearman (22 February 1905 – 31 May 1991) was a British writer and conservative activist.

== Early life ==
She was born in India to Sir Arthur Havelock James Doyle, Bt and Joyce Ethelreda Howard, who was a granddaughter of the 4th Marquess of Townshend and the 17th Earl of Suffolk. She studied at the London School of Economics from 1925 to 1931, where she was awarded the Social Science Certificate with distinction (1927) and the Academic Diploma in Psychology (1931). She also completed one year of the BSc (Economics) degree in 1927–28.

== Politics ==
Spearman was appointed to the Conservative Research Department as their first female researcher, a post she held from 1934 until 1939 and again from 1949 until 1965. She stood for Parliament twice, both times as the Conservative candidate. The first was for Poplar South in the 1935 general election, where she lost to Labour's David Morgan Adams. However, she polled more than twice as many votes as the previous Conservative candidate. She contested Kingston upon Hull Central in the 1945 general election but lost to Labour's Mark Hewitson.

In 1948, Spearman accepted Friedrich Hayek's invitation to join the Mont Pelerin Society and she was also an active member of the Institute of Economic Affairs. In 1965, she founded the short-lived Longbow Group. With Roger Scruton and Michael Oakeshott, Spearman organised the Salisbury Group in the late 1970s, and in 1982 she co-founded The Salisbury Review with Scruton.

== Personal life ==
She married Alexander Spearman in 1928. The marriage was dissolved in 1951. Latterly she was the companion of Labour MP and peer Reginald Paget.

== Works ==
- Modern Dictatorship. London: Jonathan Cape. 1939 – via Internet Archive..
- Democracy in England (London: Rockliff, 1957).
- The Novel and Society (London: Routledge & Kegan, 1966).
- The Animal Anthology (London: Baker, 1966).
- A Time You Remember (Braunton: Merlin, 1989).
