= Bruce Lansbury =

English TV producer and screenwriter

- Born: William Bruce Mageean Lansbury; 12 January 1930; London, England
- Died: 13 February 2017 (aged 87); La Quinta, California, US
- Citizenship: United Kingdom; United States
- Occupations: Television producer; television writer; screenwriter
- Years active: 1953–1996; 2003
- Known for: Producing: The Wild Wild West, Mission: Impossible, Knight Rider, Murder, She Wrote
- Spouses: Mary Hassalevris (m. 1951; died 1996) Gail England (m. 1998)
- Children: 2
- Parent(s): Edgar Lansbury; Moyna Macgill
- Family: Angela Lansbury (sister); Edgar Lansbury (twin brother); George Lansbury (grandfather); Tamara Ustinov (niece); John Postgate (cousin); Oliver Postgate (cousin); Coral Lansbury (second cousin); Malcolm Turnbull (second cousin once removed)

William Bruce Mageean Lansbury (12 January 1930 – 13 February 2017) was a British-American television producer, television writer and screenwriter. His career spanned over 30 years, from the 1960s to the 1990s, and included work on a number of American television series.

== Personal life ==
Born in London, England, in 1930, Lansbury was a son of English politician and businessman Edgar Lansbury and actress Moyna Macgill, and a grandson of future Labour Party leader George Lansbury. He was the younger brother of actress Angela Lansbury and the twin brother of theatre, film, and television producer Edgar Lansbury. Both brothers became United States citizens in 1954. Lansbury was a graduate of UCLA and married his first wife, Mary Hassalevris, in 1951. The couple had two daughters and remained together until Mary's death in 1996. In 1998, he married Gail England.

== Television ==
Lansbury joined CBS in 1959, and was promoted to vice president of programs in 1964.

From 1966 to 1969, he produced 69 episodes of The Wild Wild West, and produced 38 episodes of Mission: Impossible from 1969 to 1972.

In 1972 Lansbury joined Paramount Television as "Vice President, Creative Affairs." The Brady Bunch, Happy Days and The Odd Couple were among the series produced under his watch.

He later served as producer of the series Wonder Woman, Knight Rider, Buck Rogers in the 25th Century and executive producer for the science fiction series The Fantastic Journey. Lansbury also produced of 88 episodes of Murder, She Wrote, which starred his sister Angela, and wrote 15 episodes of the show.

== Death ==
Bruce Lansbury died on 13 February 2017, at the age of 87 in La Quinta, California, after battling Alzheimer's disease.
