= David Morgan Adams =

British politician

- Adams in 1931

Member of Parliament for Poplar South
- In office 27 October 1931 – 19 May 1942
- Preceded by: Samuel March
- Succeeded by: William Henry Guy

Personal details
- Born: 23 February 1875
- Died: 19 May 1942 (aged 67) Ilford, Essex, England
- Party: Labour

David Morgan Adams (23 February 1875 – 19 May 1942) was a British Labour Party politician.

He was the son of David Morgan Adams of Ystradowen, near Cowbridge, Glamorgan in South Wales and Bessie Dent of Poplar in East London. He received elementary education in the local school in Ystradowen before entering employment in a coalmine as a teenager. He later joined the Merchant Navy as an able seaman, subsequently working on the light ships maintained by Trinity House.

By 1913 he was resident in Poplar, and was elected to the local board of guardians. With the outbreak of the First World War in 1914 he enlisted in the Welsh Regiment, and spent most of the war in India.

After the war he was employed in the docks by the Port of London Authority and was an official in the Transport and General Workers Union. In 1919 he was elected as a Labour Party member of Poplar Borough Council, later becoming an alderman and was mayor of Poplar in 1934 – 1935. He was a member of the Metropolitan Asylums Board from 1928 – 1930.

In April 1930 he was elected unopposed to fill a vacancy on the London County Council, representing Poplar South. He subsequently held the seat at elections in 1931 and 1934, retiring from the council in 1937.

When a general election was called in October 1931, the sitting Labour Party Member of Parliament for Poplar South, Samuel March, decided to retire, and Adams was chosen by the Labour Party to defend the seat. He won the seat in a straight fight with Herbert L M Jones of the Liberal Party. At the next election in November 1935 he increased his majority, this time over Diana Spearman of the Conservative Party.

Adams died in Ilford, Essex in May 1942 aged 67.

Parliament of the United Kingdom
Preceded by Samuel March	Member of Parliament for Poplar South; 1931 –1942	Succeeded by William Henry Guy
Civic offices
Preceded by Albert Baker	Mayor of Poplar; 1934–1935	Succeeded by Albert Edward Easteal
