= Edgar Lansbury (producer) =

British-American film, television, and theatre producer (1930–2024)

- Born: Edgar George McIldowie Lansbury; 12 January 1930; London, England
- Died: 2 May 2024 (aged 94); Manhattan, New York, US
- Citizenship: United Kingdom; United States
- Occupation: Producer
- Years active: 1963–1999
- Spouse: Rose Kean Lansbury (m. 1955-2005) Louise Peabody (m. 2008)
- Children: 6
- Parent(s): Edgar Lansbury; Moyna Macgill
- Relatives: Angela Lansbury (sister); Bruce Lansbury (twin brother); George Lansbury (grandfather)

Edgar George McIldowie Lansbury (12 January 1930 – 2 May 2024) was a British-American theatre, film, and television producer.

== Background ==
Born in London, Lansbury is the son of Belfast-born actress Moyna Macgill and Edgar Lansbury, a British politician and businessman and the grandson of future Labour Party leader George Lansbury. He was the younger brother of actress Angela Lansbury and the twin brother of television producer Bruce Lansbury; both brothers became US citizens in 1954.

Edgar Lansbury died at his home in Manhattan on 2 May 2024, at the age of 94.

== Career ==
Lansbury's first Broadway production, the 1964 Frank D. Gilroy play The Subject Was Roses, won him the Tony Award for Best Play. Other Broadway credits include Promenade (1969, co-produced with Joseph Beruh), The Only Game in Town, Look to the Lilies, The Magic Show, the 1974 revival of Gypsy starring his sister, Godspell, American Buffalo (which earned him a nomination for the Drama Desk Award for Outstanding Play), and Lennon.

Off Broadway, Lansbury's productions include revivals of Arms and the Man, Waiting for Godot, and Long Day's Journey into Night, and the comedy As Bees In Honey Drown, which earned him a second Drama Desk Award nomination.

Lansbury was the recipient of the John Houseman Award, presented to him by The Acting Company to honor his commitment to the development of classical actors and a national audience for the theater.

Lansbury's film credits include The Wild Party, Blue Sunshine, and Squirm and the screen adaptations of The Subject Was Roses and Godspell. He produced the television series Coronet Blue, which was broadcast by CBS in 1967.
