= Poplar South =

Former parliamentary constituency in the United Kingdom

South Poplar
- Former borough constituency for the House of Commons
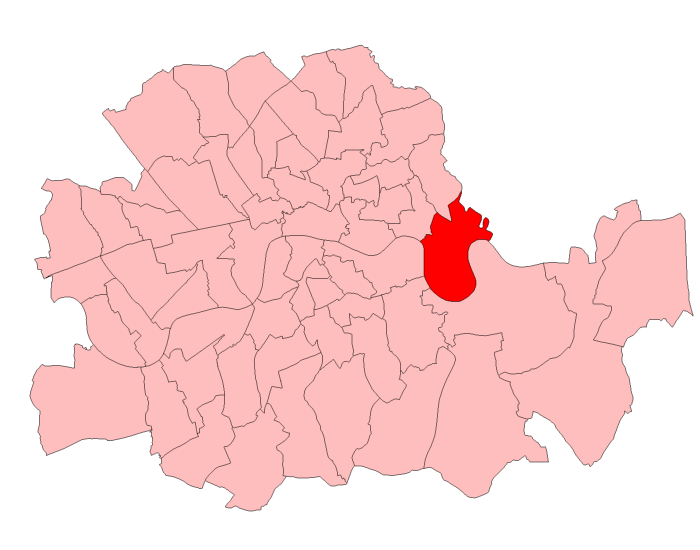
- Poplar South in the County of London

1918–1950
- Seats: one
- Created from: Poplar
- Replaced by: Poplar

Poplar South (strictly South Poplar, although this is an unusual form of official name for a borough constituency) was a parliamentary constituency centred on the Metropolitan Borough of Poplar of the County of London. It returned one Member of Parliament (MP) to the House of Commons of the Parliament of the United Kingdom.

The constituency was created for the 1918 general election, and abolished for the 1950 general election. It was then largely replaced by a new Poplar constituency.

== Boundaries ==

The Borough of Poplar wards of Bromley Central, Bromley South East, Poplar Cubitt Town, Poplar East, Poplar Millwall, Poplar North West, and Poplar West.

== Members of Parliament ==
Election	Member	Party
1918	Alfred Yeo	Coalition Liberal
Jan 1922	Alfred Yeo	National Liberal
1922	Samuel March	Labour
1931	David Adams	Labour
1942 by-election	William Guy	Labour
1950	constituency abolished: see Poplar	

== Election results ==
=== Elections in the 1910s ===
Yeo

General election 1918: South Poplar
Party		Candidate	Votes	%
C	Coalition Liberal	Alfred Yeo	8,571	49.4
	Labour	Samuel March	4,446	25.6
	Unionist	Wilfrid T. Allen	4,339	25.0
Majority			4,125	23.8
Turnout			17,356	48.1
	National Liberal win (new seat)			
C indicates candidate endorsed by the coalition government.

=== Elections in the 1920s ===
General election 1922: South Poplar
Party	Candidate	Votes	%	±%
Labour	Samuel March	14,484	58.8	+33.2
National Liberal	Alfred Yeo	10,146	41.2	−8.2
Majority		4,338	17.6	N/A
Turnout		24,630	66.5	+18.4
Labour gain from National Liberal		Swing	+20.7	

General election 1923: South Poplar
Party	Candidate	Votes	%	±%
Labour	Samuel March	14,537	64.8	+6.0
Liberal	Harold Heathcote-Williams	7,899	35.2	−6.0
Majority		6,638	29.6	+12.0
Turnout		22,436	59.5	−7.0
Labour hold		Swing	+6.0	

General election 1924: South Poplar
Party	Candidate	Votes	%	±%
Labour	Samuel March	16,224	62.6	−2.2
Liberal	Harold Heathcote-Williams	9,709	37.4	+2.2
Majority		6,515	25.2	−4.4
Turnout		25,933	67.6	+8.1
Labour hold		Swing	-2.2	

General election 1929: South Poplar
Party	Candidate	Votes	%	±%
Labour	Samuel March	19,696	64.8	+2.2
Liberal	Harold Heathcote-Williams	7,185	23.6	−13.8
Unionist	Elliot Marcet Gorst	3,532	11.6	New
Majority		12,511	41.2	+16.0
Turnout		30,413	63.6	−4.0
Labour hold		Swing	+8.0	

=== Elections in the 1930s ===
General election 1931: South Poplar
Party	Candidate	Votes	%	±%
Labour	David Morgan Adams	16,253	57.6	−7.2
Liberal	Herbert Leonard M. Jones	11,965	42.4	+18.8
Majority		4,288	15.2	−26.0
Turnout		28,218	58.6	−5.0
Labour hold		Swing	-13.0	

General election 1935: Poplar, South Poplar
Party	Candidate	Votes	%	±%
Labour	David Morgan Adams	18,715	73.2	+15.6
Conservative	Diana Spearman	6,862	26.8	New
Majority		11,853	46.4	+31.2
Turnout		25,577	55.3	−3.3
Labour hold		Swing		

=== Elections in the 1940s ===
1942 Poplar South by-election
Party	Candidate	Votes	%	±%
Labour	William Henry Guy	3,375	86.2	+13.0
Christian Socialist	P.H. Figgis	541	13.8	New
Majority		2,834	72.4	−26.0
Turnout		3,916	8.5	−46.8
Labour hold		Swing		

General election 1945: South Poplar
Party	Candidate	Votes	%	±%
Labour	William Henry Guy	11,620	89.2	+16.0
National Liberal	Joan Vickers	1,403	10.8	−16.0
Majority		10,217	78.4	+32.0
Turnout		13,023	66.2	+10.9
Labour hold		Swing		
