= Samuel March =

Samuel March (1861-10 August 1935) was a British trade union official and Labour Party politician active in the Poplar area of London.

A member of Poplar Borough Council from 1906 until 1927, he was Mayor of Poplar in 1920–21. During his mayoral term he was jailed for taking part in the Poplar Rates Rebellion.

He stood for parliament for the constituency of Poplar South at the 1918 general election but was not elected. At the next general election in 1922 he was elected to the House of Commons and held the seat at the next three elections, standing down in 1931.

He was also a member of the London County Council for Poplar South from 1919 to 1925.

He died at his home in East Ham aged 74.

Trade union offices
Preceded by Edward Ballard	General Secretary of the National Union of Vehicle Workers; 1895–1913	Succeeded by Will Godfrey
Preceded by New position	National Secretary (Commercial Transport) of the Transport and General Workers' Union; 1922	Succeeded by Archie Henderson
Parliament of the United Kingdom
Preceded by Alfred Yeo	Member of Parliament for Poplar South; 1922 –1931	Succeeded by David Morgan Adams
Civic offices
Preceded by George Lansbury	Mayor of Poplar; 1920–1921	Succeeded by Charlie Sumner
