= Bow and Bromley by-election =

Bow and Bromley by-election may refer to:

- 1912 Bow and Bromley by-election
- 1940 Bow and Bromley by-election
