= 1899 Bow and Bromley by-election =

UK Parliamentary by-election

The 1899 Bow and Bromley by-election was held on 27 October 1899 following the resignation of the incumbent Conservative MP, Lionel Holland due to ill health. Holland vacated his Parliamentary seat by being appointed Steward of the Manor of Northstead on 16 October 1899.

The seat was retained by the Conservative candidate Walter Guthrie.

Contemporary sources state that the by-election was fought on the issue of the Second Boer War which had broken out earlier that month, with Guthrie supporting the Government and Spender opposing the war.

1899 Bow and Bromley by-election
| Party | Candidate | Votes | % | ±% |
|---|---|---|---|---|
| Conservative | Walter Guthrie | 4,238 | 66.6 | +8.9 |
| Liberal | Harold Spender | 2,123 | 33.4 | −8.9 |
| Majority | | 2,115 | 33.2 | +17.8 |
| Turnout | | 6,361 | 55.8 | −15.2 |
| Registered electors | | 11,401 | | |
| Conservative hold | | Swing | +8.9 | |
