= Alfred Du Cros =

Alfred Du Cros (10 December 1868 – 21 December 1946) was a British politician. He was a Conservative Member of Parliament (MP) in 1910.

Du Cros was elected to the Commons in the January 1910 general election, succeeding the Liberal MP Stopford Brooke in the Bow and Bromley constituency. The January election had produced a hung parliament, and another general election was called in December 1910. Alfred du Cros retired at this election, and his seat was won by the Labour candidate George Lansbury.

== Footnotes ==
Parliament of the United Kingdom
Preceded by Stopford Brooke	Member of Parliament for Bow and Bromley; January 1910 – December 1910	Succeeded by George Lansbury
