= George Lansbury =

British politician and reformer (1859–1940)

The Right Honourable George Lansbury
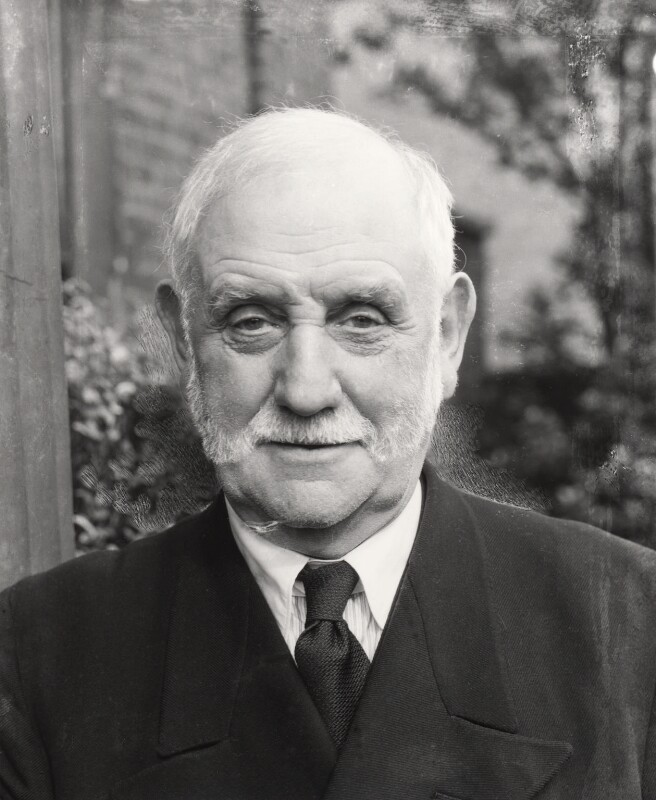
- 1935 portrait

Leader of the Labour Party
- In office 25 October 1932 – 8 October 1935
- Deputy: Clement Attlee
- Preceded by: Arthur Henderson
- Succeeded by: Clement Attlee

Leader of the Opposition
- In office 5 November 1931 – 8 October 1935
- Prime Minister: Ramsay MacDonald; Stanley Baldwin
- Deputy: Clement Attlee
- Preceded by: Arthur Henderson
- Succeeded by: Clement Attlee

First Commissioner of Works
- In office 7 June 1929 – 24 August 1931
- Prime Minister: Ramsay MacDonald
- Preceded by: The Marquess of Londonderry
- Succeeded by: The Marquess of Londonderry

Chairman of the Labour Party
- In office 7 October 1927 – 5 October 1928
- Leader: Ramsay MacDonald
- Preceded by: Frederick Roberts
- Succeeded by: Herbert Morrison

Member of Parliament for Bow and Bromley
- In office 15 November 1922 – 7 May 1940
- Preceded by: Reginald Blair
- Succeeded by: Charles Key
- In office 3 December 1910 – 26 November 1912
- Preceded by: Alfred Du Cros
- Succeeded by: Reginald Blair

Personal details
- Born: 22 February 1859 Halesworth, Suffolk, England
- Died: 7 May 1940 (aged 81) North London, England
- Party: Labour
- Spouse: Bessie Brine (m. 1880; died 1933)
- Children: 12, including Edgar, Dorothy and Daisy
- Relatives: Angela Lansbury (granddaughter); Bruce Lansbury (grandson); Edgar Lansbury (grandson); John Postgate (grandson); Oliver Postgate (grandson)
- George Lansbury's voice Recorded 1 December 1926

George Lansbury (22 February 1859 – 7 May 1940) was a British politician and social reformer who led the Labour Party from 1932 to 1935. Apart from a brief period of ministerial office during the Labour government of 1929–31, he spent his political life campaigning against established authority and vested interests, his main causes being the promotion of social justice, women's rights, and world disarmament.

Originally a radical Liberal, Lansbury became a socialist in the early 1890s, and thereafter served his local community in the East End of London in numerous elective offices. His activities were underpinned by his Christian beliefs which, except for a short period of doubt, sustained him through his life. Elected to the UK Parliament in 1910, he resigned his seat in 1912 to campaign for women's suffrage, and was briefly imprisoned after publicly supporting militant action.

In 1912, Lansbury helped to establish the Daily Herald newspaper, and became its editor. Throughout the First World War, the paper maintained a strongly pacifist stance, and supported the October 1917 Russian Revolution. These positions contributed to Lansbury's failure to be elected to Parliament in 1918. He devoted himself to local politics in his home borough of Poplar, and went to prison with 30 fellow councillors for his part in the Poplar Rates Rebellion of 1921.

After his return to Parliament in 1922, Lansbury was denied office in the brief Labour government of 1924, although he served as First Commissioner of Works in the Labour government of 1929–1931. After the political and economic crisis of August 1931, Lansbury did not follow his leader, Ramsay MacDonald, into the National Government, but remained with the Labour Party. As the most senior of the small contingent of Labour MPs that survived the 1931 UK general election, Lansbury became the Leader of the Labour Party. His pacifism and his opposition to rearmament in the face of rising European fascism put him at odds with his party, and when his position was rejected at the 1935 Labour Party conference, he resigned the leadership. He spent his final years travelling through the United States and Europe in the cause of peace and disarmament.

== Early life ==
=== East End upbringing ===
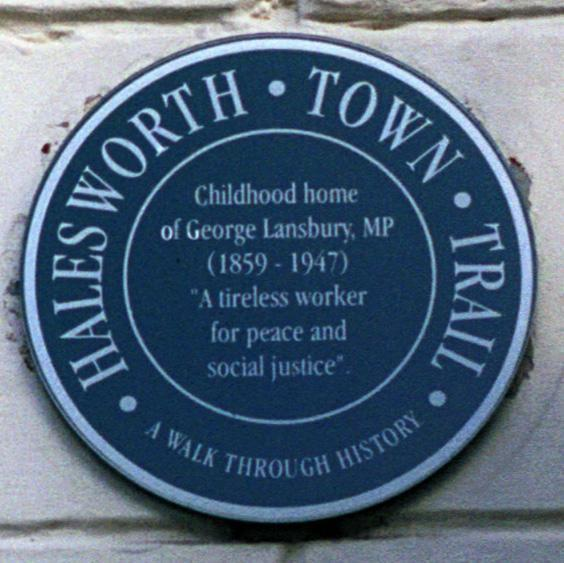
Plaque on the assumed birthplace of George Lansbury in Halesworth, Suffolk. It incorrectly records Lansbury's death year as 1947.

George Lansbury was born in Halesworth in the county of Suffolk on 22 February 1859. (Note: Lansbury's biographer Raymond Postgate gives the date and place of birth as 21 February, at the toll-house between Halesworth and Lowestoft, in the county of Suffolk. However, according to his birth certificate, Lansbury was born on 22 February 1859, at a house in Halesworth's "Thoroughfare" or High Street; a plaque provided by a local historical society in 1993 identifies the building as No. 14.) He was the third of nine children born to a railway worker, also named George Lansbury, and Anne Lansbury (née Ferris). George senior's job involved the supervision of railway construction gangs; the family was often on the move, and living conditions were primitive. Through his progressive-minded mother and grandmother, young George became familiar with the names of great contemporary reformers—Gladstone, Richard Cobden and John Bright—and began to read the radical Reynolds's Newspaper. By the end of 1868, the family had moved into the East End of London, the district in which Lansbury would live and work for almost all his life.

The essayist Ronald Blythe has described the East End of the 1860s and 1870s as "stridently English ... The smoke-blackened streets were packed with illiterate multitudes [who] stayed alive through sheer birdlike ebullience". Interspersed with spells of work, Lansbury attended schools in Bethnal Green and Whitechapel. He then held a succession of manual jobs, including work as a coaling contractor in partnership with his elder brother, James, loading and unloading coal wagons. This was heavy and dangerous work, and led to at least one near-fatal accident.

During his adolescence and early adulthood, Lansbury was a regular attender at the public gallery at the House of Commons, where he heard and remembered many of Gladstone's speeches on the main foreign policy issue of the day, the "Eastern Question". He was present at the riots which erupted outside Gladstone's house on 24 February 1878 after a peace meeting in Hyde Park. Shepherd writes that Gladstone's Liberalism, proclaiming liberty, freedom and community interests was "a heady mix that left an indelible mark" on the youthful Lansbury.

George Lansbury senior died in 1875. That year young George met fourteen-year-old Elizabeth Brine, whose father Isaac Brine owned a local sawmill. The couple eventually married in 1880, at Whitechapel parish church, where the vicar, J. Franklin Kitto, had been Lansbury's spiritual guide and counsellor. Apart from a period of doubt in the 1890s when he temporarily rejected the Church, Lansbury remained a staunch Anglican until his death.

=== Australia ===
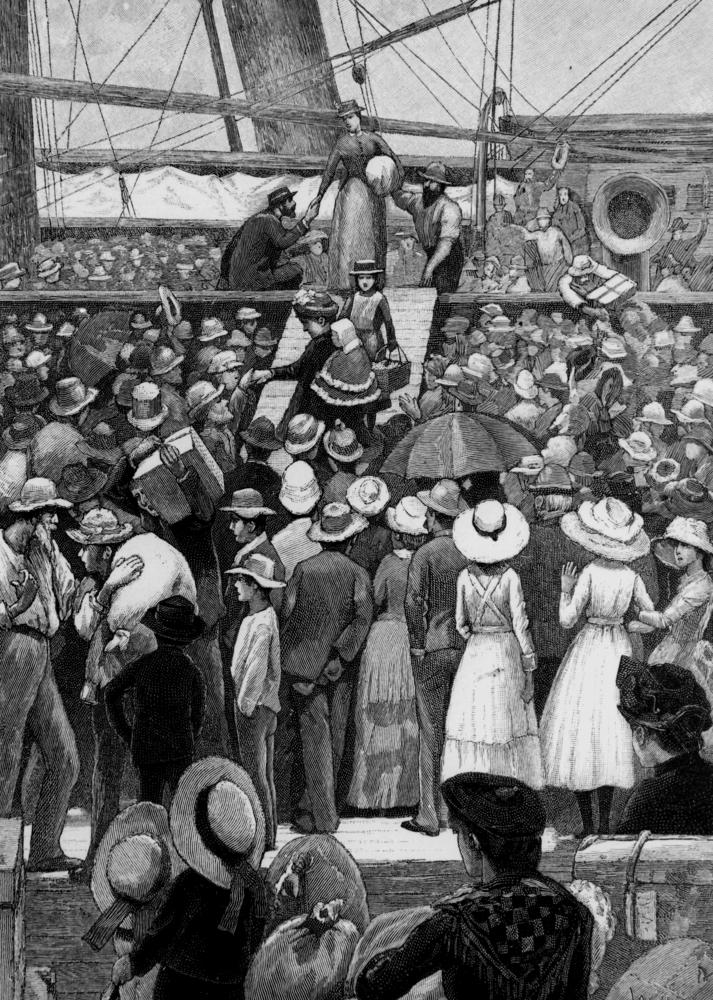
Migrants disembarking from a ship in Brisbane, c. 1885

In 1881 Lansbury was a railway contractor employing three men and living in Whitechapel with his wife Elizabeth and the first of twelve children, the new-born Bessie; another daughter, Annie, followed in 1882. Seeking to improve his family's prospects, Lansbury decided that their best hopes of prosperity lay in emigrating to Australia. The London agent-general for Queensland depicted a land of boundless opportunities, with work for all; seduced by this appealing prospect, Lansbury and Bessie raised the necessary passage money, and in May 1884 set sail with their children for Brisbane.

On the outward passage, the family experienced illness, discomfort and danger; on one occasion the ship came close to foundering during a monsoon. On arrival at Brisbane in July 1884, Lansbury found that, contrary to the London agent's promises, there was a superfluity of labour and work was hard to come by. His first job, breaking stone, proved to be too physically punishing; he moved to a better-paid position as a van driver, but was sacked when, for religious reasons, he refused to work on Sundays. He then contracted to work on a farm some 80 miles inland, to find upon arrival that his employer had misled him about living conditions and terms of employment.

For several months, the Lansbury family lived in extreme squalor before Lansbury secured release from the contract. Back in Brisbane, he worked for a while at the newly built Brisbane cricket ground. As a keen follower of the game he hoped to see the visiting English touring team play but, as Lansbury's biographer Raymond Postgate records, "he learned that cricket watching was not a pleasure for workmen". (Note: The English team, managed by Alfred Shaw, was in Australia from November 1884 until the end of March 1885, playing one match in Brisbane at the end of January.)

Throughout his tenure in Australia, Lansbury sent letters home, revealing the truth about conditions facing immigrants. To a friend he wrote in March 1885: "Mechanics are not wanted. Farm labourers are not wanted ... Hundreds of men and women are not able to get work ... The streets are foul day and night, and if I had a sister I would shoot her dead rather than see her brought out to this little hell on earth". In May 1885, having received from his father-in-law Isaac Brine sufficient funds for a passage home, the Lansbury family left Australia for good and returned to London.

== Radical Liberal ==
=== First campaigns ===
On his return to London, Lansbury took a job in Brine's timber business. In his spare time he campaigned against the false prospectuses offered by colonial emigration agents. His speech at an emigration conference at King's College in London in April 1886 impressed delegates; shortly afterwards, the government established an Emigration Information Bureau under the Colonial Office. This body was required to provide accurate information on the state of labour markets in all the government's overseas possessions.

Having joined the Liberal Party shortly after his return from Australia, Lansbury became first a ward secretary and then general secretary for the Bow and Bromley Liberal and Radical Association. His effective campaigning skills had been noted by leading Liberals, including Samuel Montagu, the Liberal MP for Whitechapel, who persuaded the young activist to be his agent in the 1885 general election. Lansbury's handling of this election campaign prompted Montagu to urge him to stand for parliament himself. Lansbury declined this, partly on practical grounds (MPs were then unpaid and he had to provide for his family), and partly on principle; he was becoming increasingly convinced that his future lay not as a radical Liberal but as a socialist. He continued to serve the Liberals, as an agent and local secretary, while expressing his socialism in a short-lived monthly radical journal, Coming Times, which he founded and co-edited with a fellow-dissident, William Hoffman.

=== London County Council elections, 1889 ===
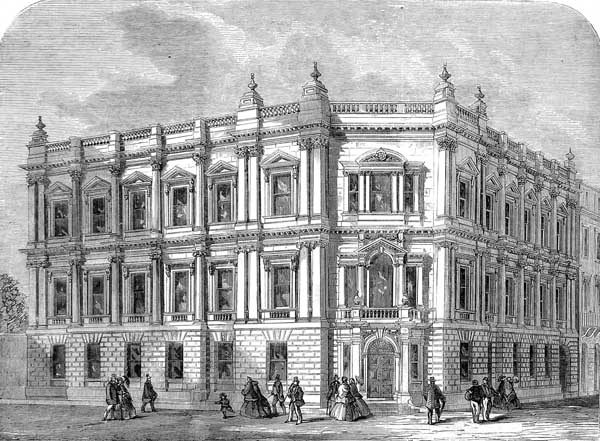
The Metropolitan Board of Works building in Spring Gardens near Trafalgar Square, original headquarters of the London County Council

In 1888 Lansbury agreed to act as election agent for Jane Cobden, who was contesting the first elections for the newly formed London County Council (LCC) as Liberal candidate for the Bow and Bromley division. Cobden, an early supporter of women's suffrage, was the fourth child of the Victorian radical statesman Richard Cobden. The Society for Promoting Women as County Councillors (SPWCC), a new women's rights group, had proposed Cobden as the candidate for Bow and Bromley and Margaret Sandhurst for Brixton. (Note: At that time women, although denied votes in parliamentary elections, had limited rights to vote in municipal elections, although whether they could stand as candidates, or serve if elected, was not legally clear.) Lansbury counselled Cobden in the issues of greatest concern to the East End electorate: housing for the poor, ending of sweated labour, rights of public assembly, and control of the police. Specific questions of women's rights were largely avoided during the campaign. On 19 January 1889 both women were elected; these triumphs were, however, short-lived. Sandhurst's qualification to serve as a county councillor was successfully challenged in the courts by her Conservative Party opponents on the grounds of her sex, and her subsequent appeal was dismissed. Cobden was not immediately challenged, but in April 1891, after a series of legal actions, she was effectively neutered as a councillor by being prevented from voting on pain of severe financial penalties. Lansbury urged her, during the hearings, to "go to prison and let the Council back you up by refusing to declare your seat vacant". Cobden did not follow this path. A Bill introduced in the House of Commons in May 1891 permitting women to serve as county councillors found little support among MPs of any party; women were not granted this right until 1907.

Lansbury was offended by his party's lukewarm support for women's rights. In a letter published in the Pall Mall Gazette he made an open call to Bow and Bromley's Liberals to "shake themselves free of party feeling and throw the energy and ability they are now wasting on minor questions into ... securing the full rights of citizenship to every woman in the land". He was further disillusioned by his party's failure to endorse the eight-hour maximum working day. Lansbury had formed the view, expressed some years later, that "Liberalism would progress just as far as the great money bags of capitalism would allow it to progress". By 1892 the Liberals no longer felt like Lansbury's political home; most of his current associates were avowed socialists: William Morris, Eleanor Marx, John Burns and Henry Hyndman, founder of the Social Democratic Federation (SDF). Nevertheless, Lansbury did not resign from the Liberals until he had fulfilled a commitment to act as election agent for John Murray MacDonald, the prospective Liberal candidate for Bow and Bromley. He saw his candidate victorious in the July 1892 general election; as soon as the result was declared, Lansbury resigned from the Liberal Party and joined the SDF.

== Socialist reformer ==
=== Social Democratic Federation ===
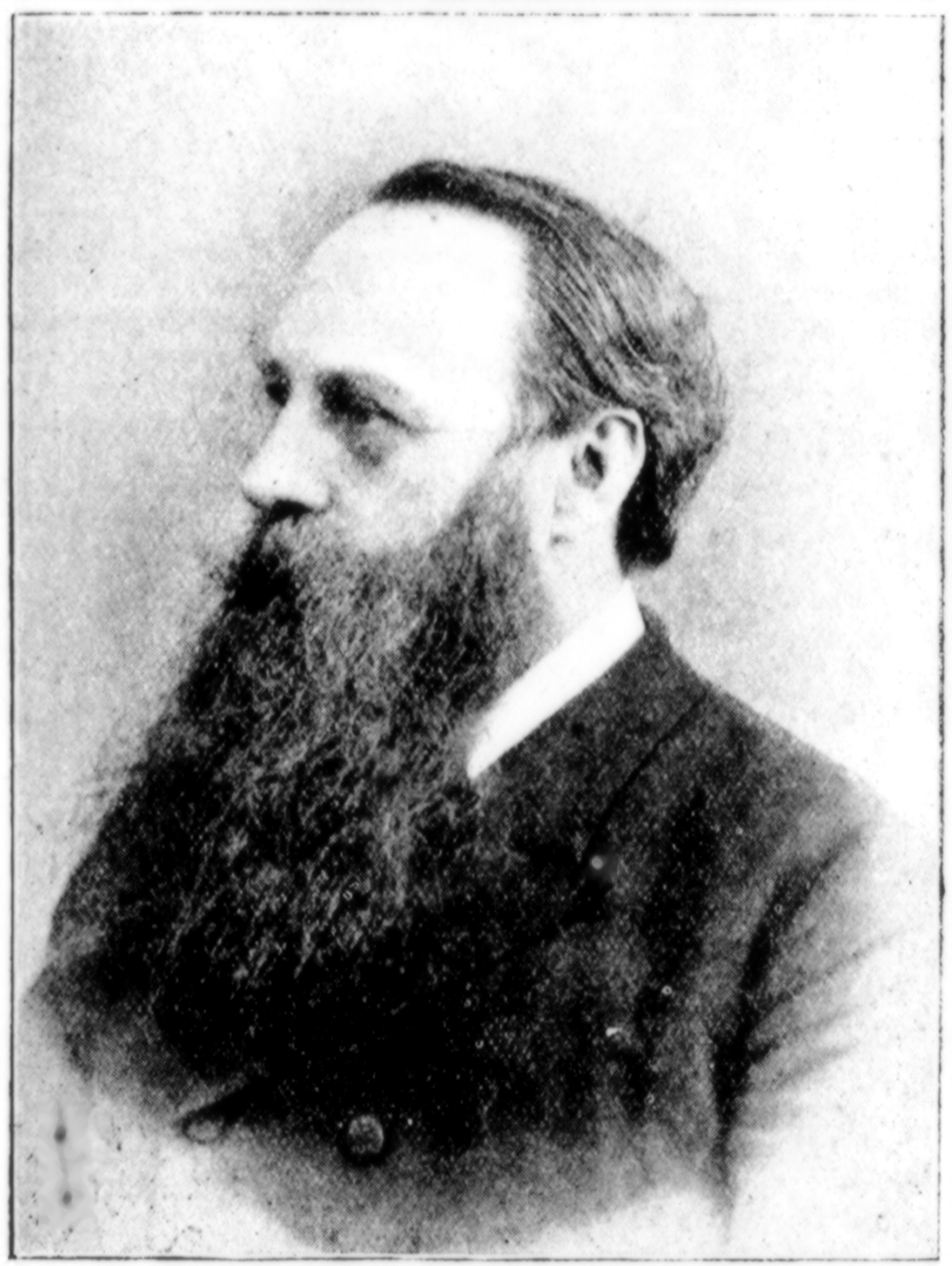
Henry Hyndman, founder of the SDF, was a key influence in Lansbury's early career.

Lansbury's choice of the SDF, from several socialist organisations, reflected his admiration for Hyndman, whom he considered "one of the truly great ones". Lansbury quickly became the federation's most tireless propagandist, travelling throughout Britain to address meetings or to demonstrate solidarity with workers involved in industrial disputes. (Note: There being no specific trade unions for sawmill workers Lansbury had, in 1889, joined the Gas-workers and General Labourers' Union. He remained a member for the remainder of his life, and for many years attended Labour Party conferences as a union rather than a local party delegate.) Around this time, Lansbury temporarily set aside his Christian beliefs and became a member of the East London Ethical Society. One factor in his disillusion with the Church was the local clergy's unsympathetic approach to poor relief, and their opposition to collective political action.

In 1895 Lansbury fought two parliamentary elections for the SDF in Walworth, first a by-election on 14 May, then the 1895 general election two months later. Despite his energetic campaigning he was heavily defeated on each occasion, with tiny proportions of the vote. After these dismal results, Lansbury was persuaded by Hyndman to give up his job at the sawmill and become the SDF's full-time salaried national organiser. He preached a straightforward revolutionary doctrine: "The time has arrived", he informed an audience at Todmorden in Lancashire, "for the working classes to seize political power and use it to overthrow the competitive system and establish in its place state cooperation". Lansbury's time as SDF national organiser did not last long; in 1896, when Isaac Brine died suddenly, Lansbury thought that his family duty required him to take charge of the sawmill, and he returned home to Bow.

In the general election of 1900 a pact with the Liberals in the Bow and Bromley constituency gave Lansbury, the SDF candidate, a straight fight against the Conservative incumbent, Walter Murray Guthrie. Lansbury's cause was hindered by his public opposition to the Boer War at a time when war fever was strong, while Guthrie, a former soldier, stressed his military credentials. Lansbury lost the election, though his total of 2,258 votes against Guthrie's 4,403 was considered creditable by the press. This campaign was Lansbury's last major effort on behalf of the SDF. He became disenchanted by Hyndman's inability to work with other socialist groups, and in about 1903 resigned from the SDF to join the Independent Labour Party (ILP). At around this time, Lansbury rediscovered his Christian faith and rejoined the Anglican Church. (Note: In 1920 Lansbury published a rationale for his Christian beliefs, under the title These Things Shall Be.)

=== Poor Law guardian ===
"You scratch my back and I'll scratch yours" was the basis of policy where jobs and contracts were concerned ... the slum owner and agent could be depended upon to create the conditions which produce disease; the doctor would then get the job of attending the sick, the chemist would be needed to supply drugs, the parson to pray, and when, between them all, the victims died the undertaker was on hand to bury them.

— (Lansbury, summarising the extent of cronyism and abuse in the Poor Law system.)

In April 1893 Lansbury achieved his first elective office when he became a Poor Law guardian for the district of Poplar. In place of the traditionally harsh workhouse regime that was the norm, Lansbury proposed a programme of reform, whereby the workhouse became "an agency of help instead of a place of despair", and the stigma of poverty was removed. Lansbury was one of a minority socialist bloc which was often able, through its energy and commitment, to win support for its plans.

Education for the poor was one of Lansbury's major concerns. He helped to transform the Forest Gate District School, previously a punitive establishment run on quasi-military lines, into a proper place of education that became the Poplar Training School, and was still in existence more than half a century later. (Note: In 1907 the school moved to new buildings in Shenfield, Essex. By 1974 it had become an adult training centre; many of the original buildings were demolished and rebuilt in the 1980s.) At the 1897 annual Poor Law Conference Lansbury summarised his views on poor relief in his first published paper: "The Principles of the English Poor Law". His analysis offered a Marxist critique of capitalism: only the reorganisation of industry on collectivist lines would solve contemporary problems.

Lansbury added to his public duties when, in 1903, he was elected to Poplar Borough Council. In the summer of that year he met Joseph Fels, a rich American soap manufacturer with a penchant for social projects. Lansbury persuaded Fels, in 1904, to purchase a 100-acre farm at Laindon, in Essex, which was converted into a labour colony that provided regular work for Poplar's unemployed and destitute. Fels also agreed to finance a much larger colony at Hollesley Bay in Suffolk, to be operated as a government scheme under the Local Government Board. Both projects were initially successful, but were undermined after the election of a Liberal government in 1906. The new Local Government minister was John Burns, a former SDF stalwart now ensconced in the Liberal Party who had become a firm opponent of socialism. Burns encouraged a campaign of propaganda to discredit the principle of labour colonies, which were presented as money-wasting ventures that pampered idlers and scroungers. A formal enquiry revealed irregularities in the operation of the scheme, though it exonerated Lansbury. He retained the confidence of his electorate and was easily re-elected to the Board of Guardians in 1907.

In 1905 Lansbury was appointed to a Royal Commission on the Poor Laws, which deliberated for four years. Lansbury, together with Beatrice Webb of the Fabian Society, argued for the complete abolition of the Poor Laws and their replacement by a system that incorporated old age pensions, a minimum wage, and national and local public works projects. These proposals were embodied at the commission's conclusion in a minority report signed by Lansbury and Webb; the majority report was, according to Postgate, "an ill-considered jumble of suggestions ... so preposterously inadequate that no attempts were ever made to implement it." Most of the minority's recommendations in time became national policy; the Poor Laws were finally abolished by the Local Government Act 1929.

== National prominence ==
=== Campaigner for women's suffrage ===
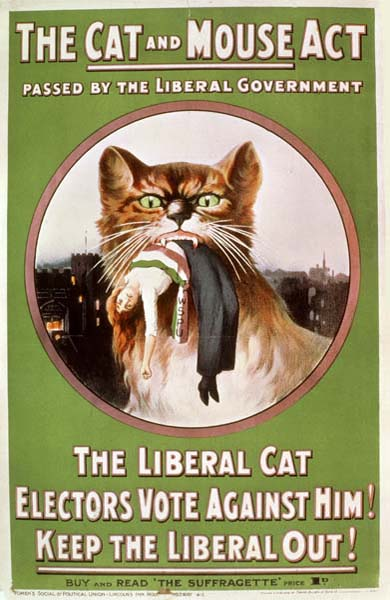
WSPU poster from 1914, denouncing the Liberal government's controversial "Cat and Mouse Act"

In the general election of January 1906 Lansbury stood as an independent socialist candidate in Middlesbrough, on a strong "votes for women" platform. This was his first campaign based on women's rights since the LCC election of 1889. He had been recommended to the constituency by Joseph Fels, who agreed to meet his expenses. The local ILP leadership was committed by an electoral pact to support the Liberal candidate, and could not endorse Lansbury, who secured less than 9 per cent of the vote. The campaign had been managed by Marion Coates Hansen, a prominent local suffragist. Under Hansen's influence Lansbury took up the cause of "votes for women"; he allied himself with the Women's Social and Political Union (WSPU), the more militant of the main suffragist organisations, and became a close associate of Emmeline Pankhurst and her family.

The Liberal government elected in 1906 with a large majority showed little interest in the issue of women's suffrage; when they lost their parliamentary majority in the general election of January 1910 they were dependent on the votes of the 40-odd Labour members. (Note: In 1900 the Labour Representation Committee (LRC) had been formed to promote greater working class representation in parliament. In 1906 the LRC became a de facto political party, "the Labour Party", to which socialist bodies (SDF, ILP, trade unions) could affiliate; MPs elected under the LRC banner took the label "Labour". The party did not acquire its modern mass-membership nature until reforms under a new constitution were implemented in 1918.) To Lansbury's dismay, Labour did not use this leverage to promote votes for women, instead giving the government virtually unqualified support to keep the Conservatives out of power. Lansbury had failed to win election as Labour's candidate at Bow and Bromley in January 1910; however, the continuing political crisis which developed from David Lloyd George's controversial 1909 "People's Budget" led to another general election in December 1910. Lansbury again fought Bow and Bromley, and this time was successful.

Lansbury found little support in his fight for women's suffrage from his parliamentary Labour colleagues, whom he dismissed as "a weak, flabby lot". In parliament, he denounced the prime minister, H. H. Asquith, for the cruelties being inflicted on imprisoned suffragists: "You are beneath contempt ... you ought to be driven from public life". He was temporarily suspended from the House for "disorderly conduct". In October 1912, aware of the unbridgeable gap between his own position and that of his Labour colleagues, Lansbury resigned his seat to fight a by-election in Bow and Bromley on the specific issue of women's suffrage. The suffragettes sent Grace Roe to help with the campaign. He lost to his Conservative opponent, who campaigned on the slogan "No Petticoat Government". Commenting on the result, the Labour MP Will Thorne opined that no constituency could ever be won on the single question of votes for women.

Out of parliament, on 26 April 1913 Lansbury addressed a WSPU rally at the Albert Hall, and openly defended violent methods: "Let them burn and destroy property and do anything they will, and for every leader that is taken away, let a dozen step forward in their place". For this, Lansbury was charged with incitement, convicted and, after the dismissal of an appeal, sentenced to three months' imprisonment. He immediately went on hunger strike, and was released after four days; although liable to rearrest under the so-called "Cat and Mouse Act", (Note: The Cat and Mouse Act, officially the Prisoners (Temporary Discharge for Ill Health) Act 1913, allowed for the temporary release of hunger-striking prisoners when they were in danger of death from starvation, and their re-imprisonment when they had sufficiently recovered.) he was thereafter left at liberty. In the autumn of 1913, at the invitation of Fels, Lansbury and his wife travelled to America and Canada for an extended holiday. On his return, he devoted his main efforts to the recently founded newspaper, the Daily Herald.

=== War, Daily Herald and Bolshevism ===
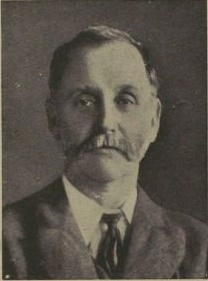
Lansbury in 1920

The Daily Herald began as a temporary bulletin during the London printers' strike of 1910–11. After the strike ended, Lansbury and others raised sufficient funds for the Herald to be relaunched in April 1912 as a socialist daily newspaper. The paper attracted contributions from distinguished writers such as H. G. Wells, Hilaire Belloc, G. K. Chesterton and George Bernard Shaw, some of whom, Blythe notes, "weren't socialists at all but simply used [the paper] as a platform for their personal literary anarchy." Lansbury contributed regularly in support of his various causes, in particular the militant suffrage campaign, and early in 1914 assumed the paper's editorship.

Before the outbreak of the First World War in August 1914, the Herald took a strong anti-war line. Addressing a large demonstration in Trafalgar Square on 2 August 1914, Lansbury blamed the coming conflict on capitalism: "The workers of all countries have no quarrel. They are ... exploited in times of peace and sent out to be massacred in times of war". Lansbury's position was at odds with that of most of the Labour movement, which allied itself with the wartime coalition governments of Asquith and, from 1916, Lloyd George. (Note: Arthur Henderson, who led the parliamentary Labour group between 1914 and 1917, occupied several cabinet posts under Asquith and Lloyd George, and was a member of the latter's small inner war cabinet. Other Labour members with government posts included William Brace and George Roberts.) In the prevailing jingoistic mood, numerous readers looked to the Herald—reduced by wartime economies to a weekly format—to present a balanced news perspective, untainted by war fever and chauvinism. During the winter of 1914–15, Lansbury visited the Western Front trenches. He sent eye-witness accounts to the paper, which supported calls for a negotiated peace with Germany in line with President Woodrow Wilson's later "peace note" of January 1917. The paper also gave sympathetic coverage to conscientious objectors, and to Irish and Indian nationalists.

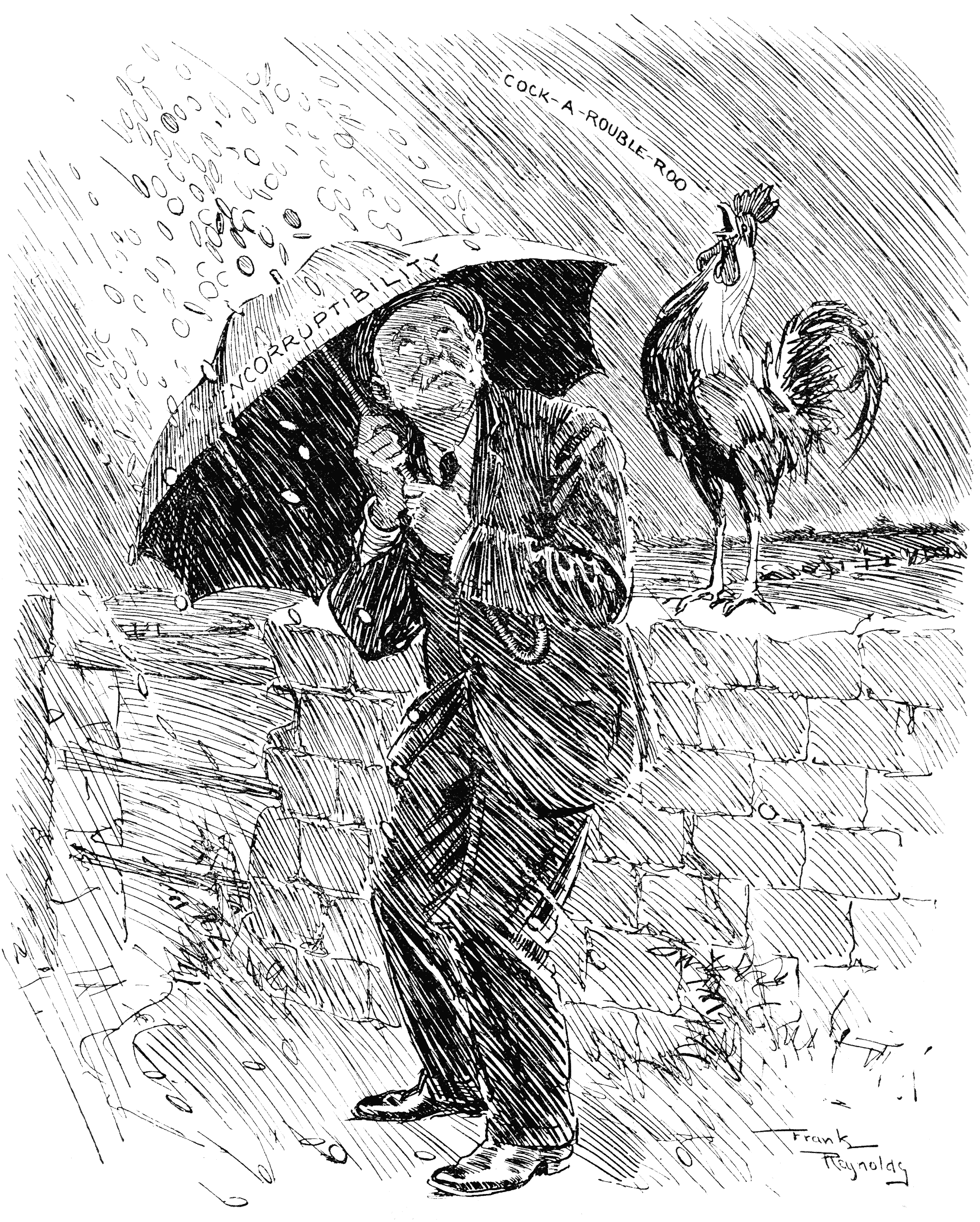
A Punch cartoon of 22 September 1920, mocking Lansbury's denials of Bolshevist funding for the Daily Herald. The crowing cockerel satirises the Biblical Denial of Peter.

Lansbury used the pages of the Daily Herald to welcome the February 1917 revolution in Russia as "a new star of hope ... arisen over Europe". At an Albert Hall rally on 18 March 1918 he hailed the spirit and enthusiasm of "this Russian movement", and urged his audience to "be ready to die, if necessary, for our faith". When the war ended in November 1918, Lloyd George called an immediate general election, correctly calculating that victory euphoria would keep his coalition in power. In this triumphalist climate, candidates such as Lansbury who had opposed the war found themselves unpopular, and he failed to retake his Bow and Bromley seat.

The Herald re-emerged as a daily paper in March 1919. Under Lansbury's direction it maintained a strong and ultimately successful campaign against British intervention in the Russian Civil War. In February 1920 Lansbury travelled to Russia where he met Lenin and other Bolshevik leaders. He published an account: What I Saw in Russia, but the impact of the visit was overshadowed by accusations that the Herald was being financed from Bolshevist sources, a charge vehemently denied by Lansbury: "We have received no Bolshevist money, no Bolshevist paper, no Bolshevist bonds". Unknown to Lansbury, the allegations had some truth which, when exposed, caused him and the paper considerable embarrassment. By 1922 the Herald's financial problems had become such that it could no longer continue as a private venture financed by donations. Lansbury resigned the editorship and made the paper over to the Labour Party and the Trades Union Congress (TUC), although he continued to write for it and remained its titular general manager until 3 January 1925.

=== "Poplarism": the 1921 rates revolt ===
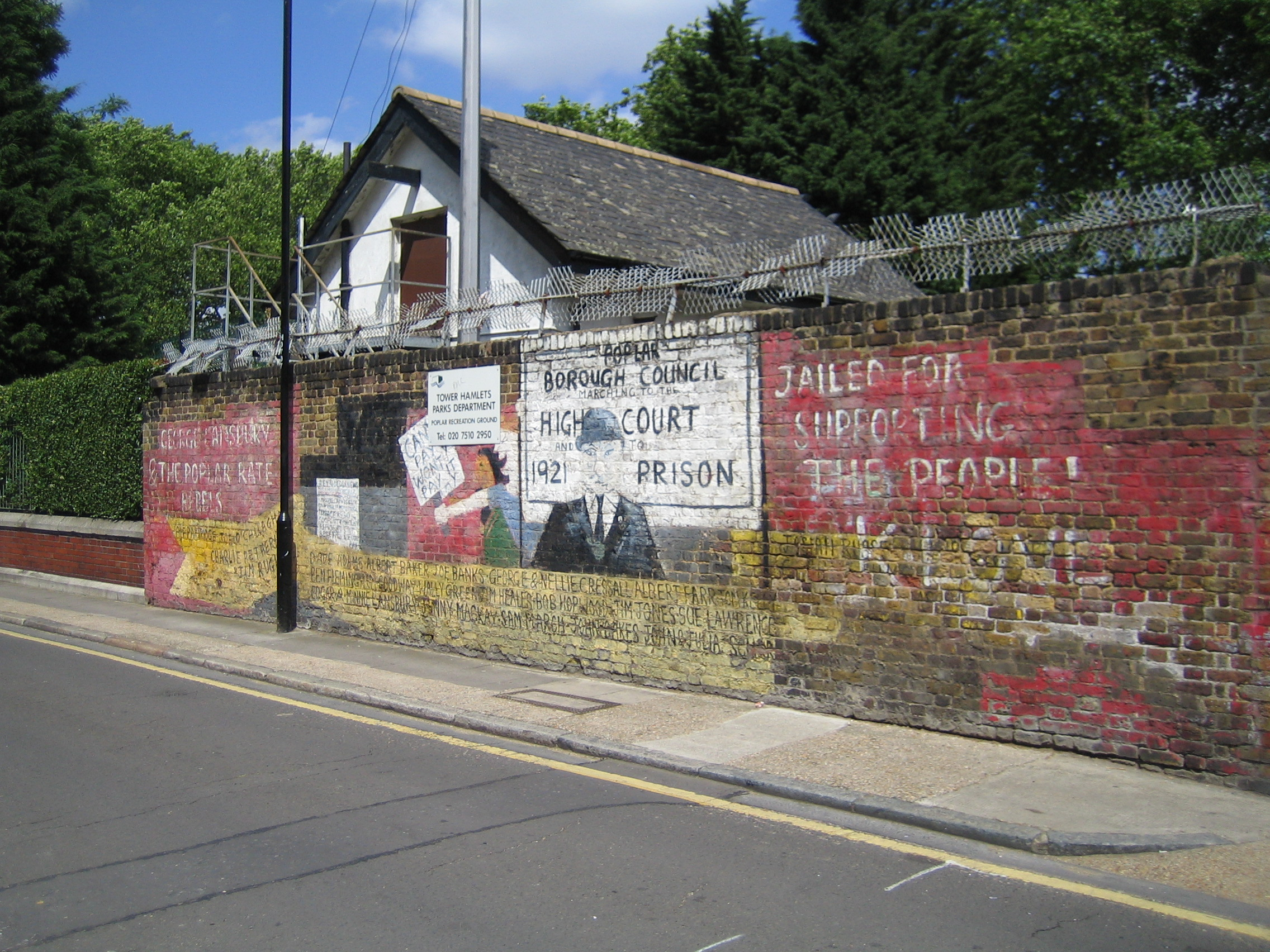
The Poplar Rates Rebellion Mural in Poplar commemorates the 1921 rates revolt.

Throughout his national campaigns, Lansbury remained a Poplar borough councillor and Poor Law guardian, and between 1910 and 1913 served a three-year term as a London County Councillor. In 1919 he became the first Labour mayor of Poplar. Under the then-existing financial system for local government, boroughs were individually responsible for poor relief within their boundaries. This discriminated heavily against poorer councils such as Poplar, where rates revenues were low and poverty and unemployment, always severe, were exacerbated in times of economic recession. (Note: In 1921 the borough of Poplar, with a population of 161,000, has a rateable value of less than £1 million; the product of a penny rate was £3643. By contrast, the rateable value of the wealthy borough of Westminster, with a population of 141,000, was £8 million, and the product of a penny rate was £31,719.) Under this system, Postgate argues, "The wealthy West End boroughs were evading responsibility, as though the desolate and silent docks were the results of a failure by the Poplar Borough Council". In addition to meeting the costs of its own obligations, the council was required to levy precepts to pay for services provided by bodies such as the London County Council and the Metropolitan Police. Lansbury had long argued that a degree of rates equalisation across London was necessary, to share costs more fairly.

At its meeting on 22 March 1921 the Poplar Council resolved not to make its precepts and to apply these revenues to the costs of local poor relief. This illegal action created a sensation, and led to legal proceedings against the council. On 29 July the thirty councillors involved marched in procession from Bow to the High Court, headed by a brass band. Informed by the judge that they must apply the precepts, the councillors would not budge; early in September, Lansbury and 29 fellow-councillors were imprisoned for contempt of court. Among those sentenced were his son Edgar and Edgar's wife, Minnie.

The defiance of the Poplar councillors generated widespread interest and sympathy, and the publicity embarrassed the government. Several other Labour-controlled councils (including Stepney whose mayor was the future Labour leader Clement Attlee) threatened similar policies. After six weeks' incarceration the councillors were released, and a government conference was convened to resolve the matter. This conference brought a significant personal victory for Lansbury: the passage of the Local Authorities (Financial Provisions) Act, which equalised the poor relief burden across all the London boroughs. As a result, the rates in Poplar fell by a third, and additional revenues of £400,000 was gained by the borough. Lansbury was hailed as a hero; in the 1922 general election he won the parliamentary seat of Bow and Bromley with a majority of nearly 7,000, and would hold it for the rest of his life. The term "Poplarism", always identified closely with Lansbury, became part of the political lexicon, applied generally to campaigns where local government stood against central government on behalf of the poor and least privileged of society.

== Parliament and national office ==
=== Labour backbencher ===
"A few centuries ago one King who stood up against the common people of that day lost his head—really lost it ... Since that day kings and queens had been what they ought to be if you had them. They never interfered with ordinary politics and George V would be well advised to keep his finger out of the pie now."

— (Lansbury's warning to the King shortly before the first Labour government took office in January 1924)

In May 1923 the Conservative prime minister, Bonar Law, resigned for health reasons. In December his successor, Stanley Baldwin, called another election in which the Conservatives lost their majority, with Labour in a strong second place. King George V advised Baldwin, as leader of the largest party, not to resign his office until defeated by a vote in the House of Commons. Defeat duly occurred on 21 January 1924, when the Liberals decided to throw in their lot with Labour. The king then asked Labour's leader, Ramsay MacDonald, to form a government. Lansbury caused royal offence by publicly implying that the king had colluded with other parties to keep Labour out, and by his references to the fate of Charles I. Despite his seniority, Lansbury was offered only a junior non-cabinet post in the new government, which he declined. He believed that his exclusion from the cabinet followed pressure from the king. At the 1923 Labour Party conference, while declaring himself a republican, Lansbury opposed two motions calling for the abolition of the monarchy, deeming the issue a "distraction". Social revolution, he said, would one day remove the monarchy.

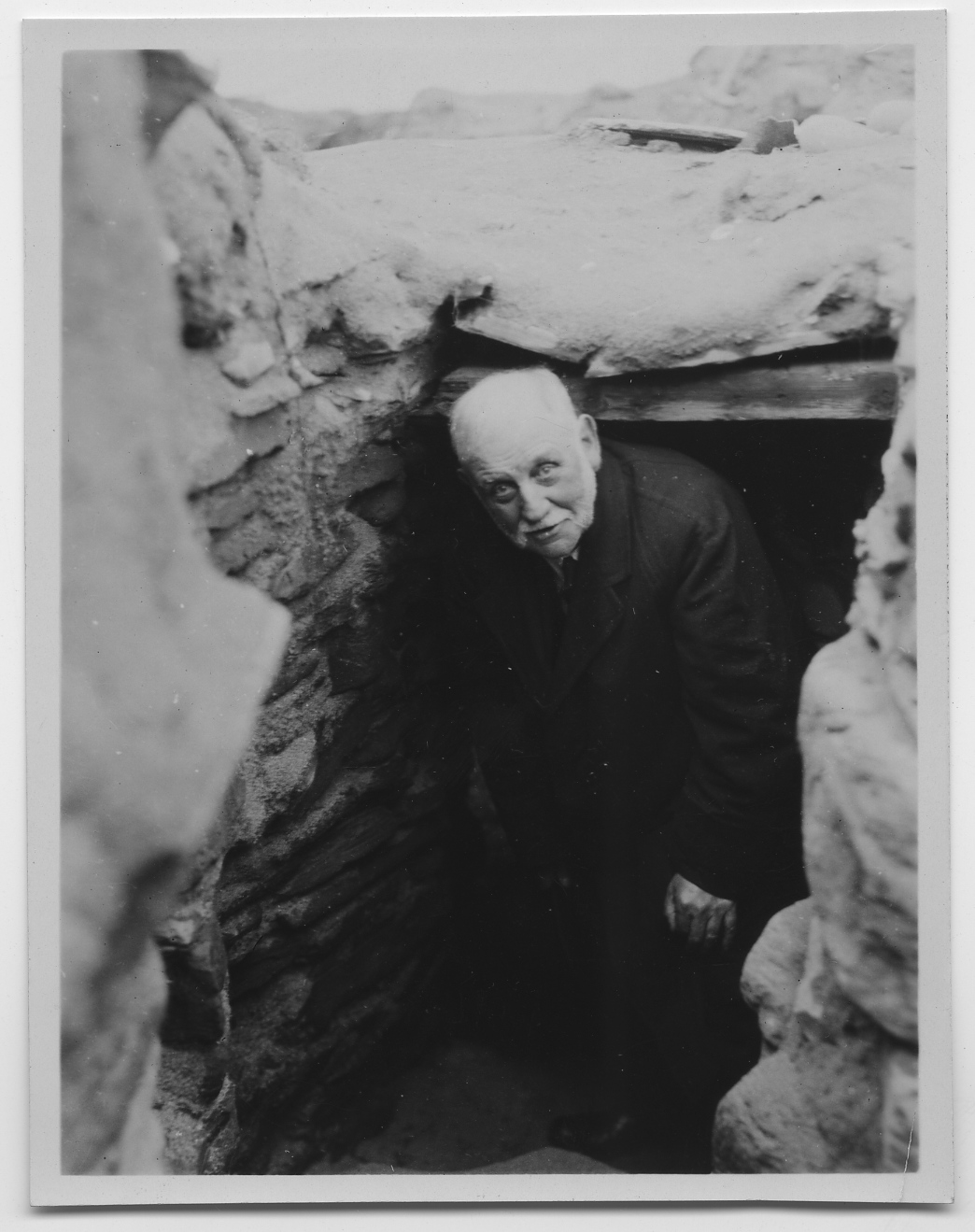
Inspecting the Neolithic village of Skara Brae, Mainland, Orkney, when First Commissioner at the Office of Works in 1929

MacDonald's administration lasted less than a year before, in October 1924, the Liberals withdrew their support; Blythe comments that the first Labour government had been "neither exhilarating nor competent". According to Shepherd, MacDonald's chief priority was to show that Labour was "fit to govern", and he had thus acted with conservative caution. The December general election returned the Conservatives to power; Lansbury maintained that Labour's cause "marches forward irrespective of electoral results". After the defeat Lansbury was briefly touted as an alternative party leader to MacDonald, a proposition he rejected. In 1925, free from the Daily Herald, he founded and edited Lansbury's Labour Weekly, which became a mouthpiece for his personal creed of socialism, democracy and pacifism until it merged with the New Leader in 1927

Speech by George Lansbury
George Lansbury introduces the gramophone records of left-wing songs and speeches published by Lansbury's Labour Weekly

. Before the General Strike of May 1926, Lansbury used the Weekly to instruct the Trades Union Congress (TUC) on preparations for the coming struggle. However, when the strike came the TUC did not want his assistance; among the reasons for their distrust was Lansbury's continuing advocacy of the right of communist organisations to affiliate to the Labour Party—he privately opined that British communists on their own "couldn't run a whelk-stall".

Lansbury continued his private campaigns in parliament, saying "I intend on every occasion to ... hinder the progress of business". In April 1926 he and 12 other opposition MPs prevented a vote in the House of Commons by obstructing the voting lobbies; they were temporarily suspended by the Speaker. During frequent clashes in the House with Neville Chamberlain, the Minister of Health responsible for Poor Law administration and reform, Lansbury referred to the "Ministry of Death", and called the minister a "pinchbeck Napoleon". However, within the Labour Party itself, Lansbury's status and popularity led to his election as the party's chairman (a largely titular office) in 1927–28. Lansbury also became president of the International League Against Imperialism, where among his fellow executive members were Jawaharlal Nehru, Mme. Sun Yat-sen and Albert Einstein. In 1928, short of money following the failure of the family business, Lansbury published his autobiography, My Life, for which he received what he termed "a fairly generous cheque" from the publishers, Constable & Co.

=== Cabinet minister, 1929–31 ===
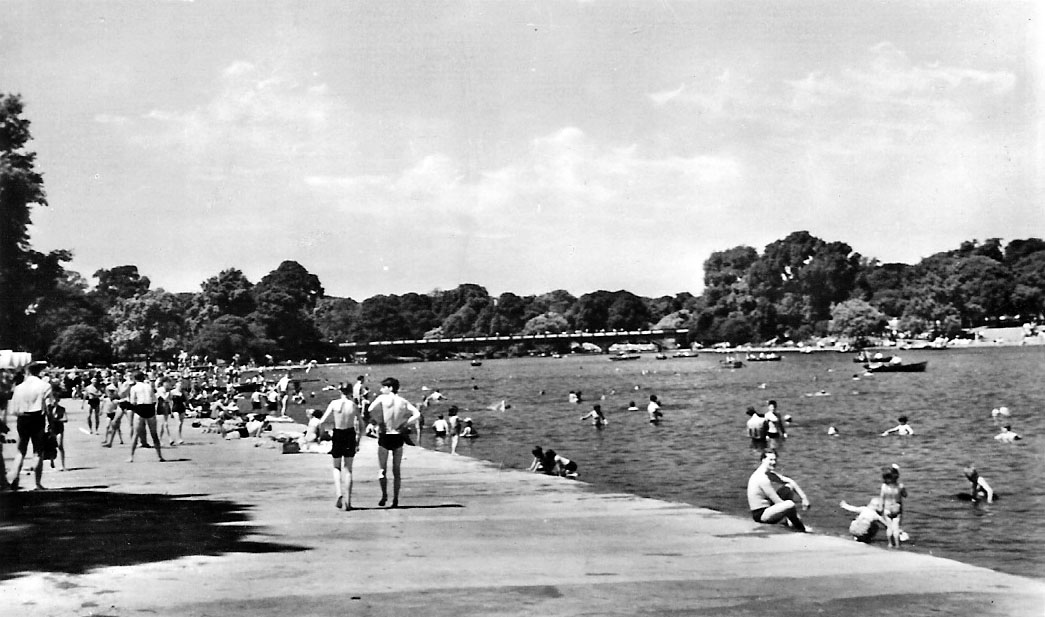
The Hyde Park Lido, one lasting result of Lansbury's brief term of national office

In the 1929 general election Labour emerged as the largest party, with 287 seats—but without an overall majority. Once again, MacDonald formed a government dependent on Liberal support. Lansbury joined the new cabinet as First Commissioner of Works, with responsibilities for historic buildings and monuments and for the royal parks. This position was widely regarded as a sinecure; nevertheless, Lansbury proved an active minister who did much to improve public recreation facilities. His most notable achievement was the Lido on the Serpentine in Hyde Park; according to the historian A. J. P. Taylor "the only thing which keeps the memory of the second Labour government alive". A circular memorial plaque to Lansbury can be seen on the exterior wall of the Lido Bar and Cafe. Lansbury's duties brought him into frequent contact with the King, who as Ranger of the royal parks insisted on regular consultation. Contrary to the expectations of some the two formed a cordial relationship.

The years of MacDonald's second government were dominated by the economic depression that followed the Wall Street crash of October 1929. Lansbury was appointed to a committee, chaired by J.H. Thomas and including Sir Oswald Mosley, charged with finding a solution to unemployment. Mosley produced a memorandum which called for a large-scale programme of public works; this was rejected by the Chancellor of the Exchequer, Philip Snowden, on grounds of cost. (Note: Mosley resigned from the government. He later left the Labour Party and formed the New Party, from which developed the British Union of Fascists.) At the end of July 1931 the May Committee, appointed in February to investigate government spending, prescribed heavy cuts, including a massive reduction in unemployment benefit. (Note: The May recommendations were for immediate savings of £120 million (a vast sum at the time), of which £24 million would come from increased taxation and £96 million by expenditure cuts of which the largest proportion would come from unemployment relief. The economist John Maynard Keynes called the May report "the most foolish document I ever had the misfortune to read".)

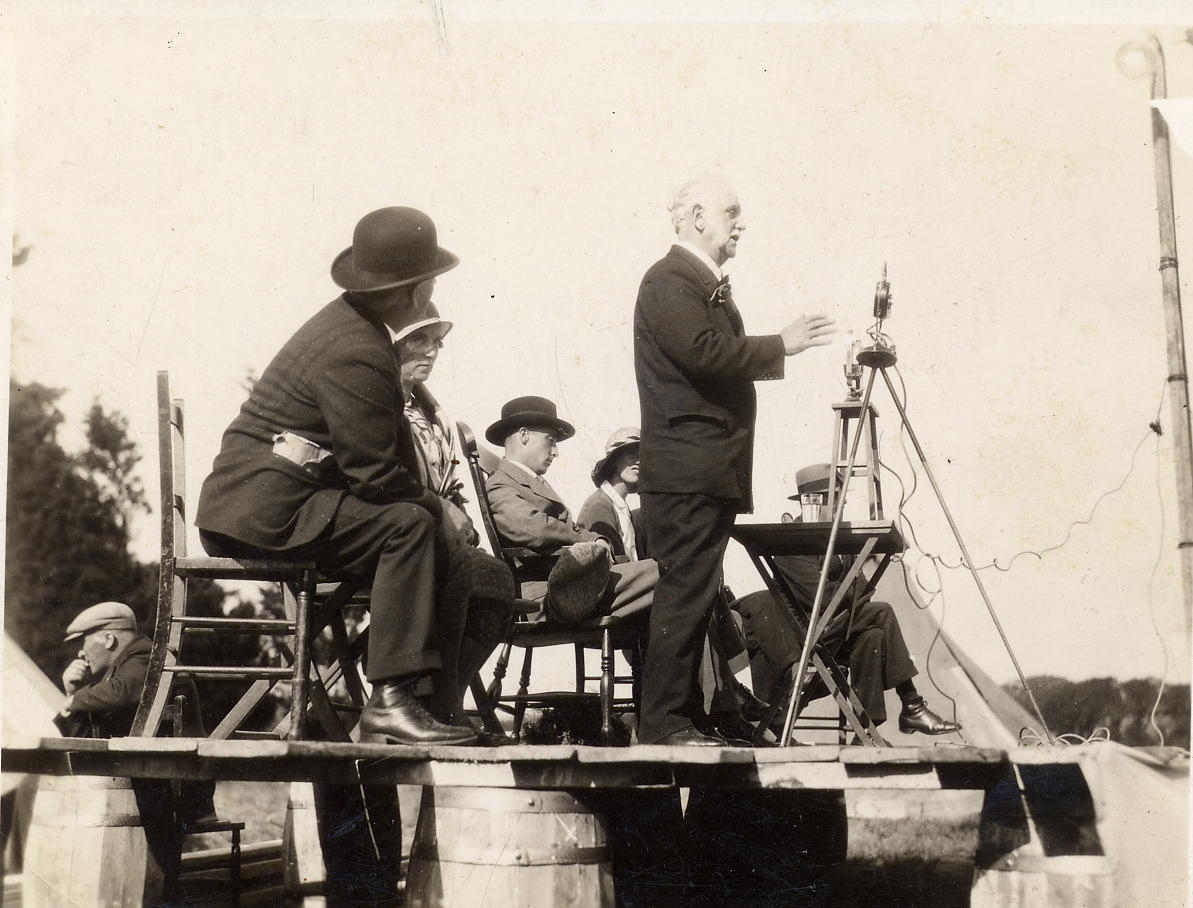
Making a speech, c. 1935

During August, in an atmosphere of financial panic and a run on the pound, the government debated the report. MacDonald and Snowden were prepared to implement it, but Lansbury and nine other cabinet ministers rejected the cut in unemployment benefit. Thus divided, the government could not continue; MacDonald, however, did not resign as prime minister. After discussions with the opposition leaders and the king he formed a national all-party coalition, with a "doctor's mandate" to tackle the economic crisis. The great majority of Labour MPs, including Lansbury, were opposed to this action; MacDonald and the few who followed him were expelled from the party, and Arthur Henderson became leader. MacDonald's move was broadly welcomed in the country, however, and in the general election held in October 1931 the national government was returned with an enormous majority. Labour was reduced to 46 members; Lansbury was the only senior member of the Labour leadership to retain his seat. (Note: Taylor gives the 1931 election result as National Government 521 (Conservatives, National Labour and National Liberals); opposition: Labour 52, Liberal 33, Lloyd George family 4. The Labour total of 52 included 6 ILP members who disaffiliated from the Labour Party in 1932.)

== Party leader ==
Although defeated in the election, Henderson remained the party leader while Lansbury headed the Labour group in parliament—the Parliamentary Labour Party (PLP). In October 1932 Henderson resigned and Lansbury succeeded him. In most historians' reckonings, Lansbury led his small parliamentary force with skill and flair. He was also, says Shepherd, an inspiration to the dispirited Labour rank and file. As leader he began the process of reforming the party's organisation and machinery, efforts which resulted in considerable by-election and municipal election successes—including control of the LCC under Herbert Morrison in 1934. During a speech at a Labour Party conference held in 1932, Lansbury predicted the end of the capitalist system, expressing his confidence that

The world has come to the end of the capitalist system and that there is no chance of building up any sort of real civilisation on this cut-throat competition – this swindling and cheating that is going on in the money markets and Stock Exchanges of the world.

According to Blythe, Lansbury "represented political hope and decency to the three million unemployed." During this period Lansbury published his political credo, My England (1934), which envisioned a future socialist state achieved by a mixture of revolutionary and evolutionary methods.

I believe that force never has and never will bring permanent peace and goodwill in the world ... God intends us to live peacefully and quietly with one another. If some people do not allow us to do so, I am ready to stand as the early Christians did, and say, this is our faith, this is where we stand, and, if necessary, this is where we will die.

— (From Lansbury's speech to the 1935 Labour Party conference)

The small Labour group in parliament had little influence over economic policy; Lansbury's term as leader was dominated by foreign affairs and disarmament, and by policy disagreements within the Labour movement. The official party position was based on collective security through the League of Nations and on multilateral disarmament. Lansbury, supported by many in the PLP, adopted a position of Christian pacifism, unilateral disarmament and the dismantling of the British Empire. Under his influence the party's 1933 conference passed resolutions calling for the "total disarmament of all nations", and pledged to take no part in war. Pacifism became temporarily popular in the country; on 9 February 1933 the Oxford Union voted by 275 to 153 that it would "in no circumstances fight for its King and Country", and the Fulham East by-election in October 1933 was easily won by a Labour candidate committed to full disarmament. Lansbury sent a message to the constituency in his position as Labour Leader: "I would close every recruiting station, disband the Army and disarm the Air Force. I would abolish the whole dreadful equipment of war and say to the world: 'Do your worst'." October 1934 saw the emergence of the Peace Pledge Union. In response to the Peace Pledge Union, the League of Nations Union conducted the 1934–35 Peace Ballot, an unofficial public referendum, which produced massive majorities in support of the League of Nations, multilateral disarmament, and conflict resolution through non-military means – though crucially, a three-fold majority supported military measures as a last resort. Meanwhile, Adolf Hitler had come to power in Germany, and had withdrawn from the international Conference on Disarmament in Geneva. Blythe observes that Britain's noisy flirtations with pacifism "drowned out the sounds from German dockyards", as German rearmament began.

As fascism and militarism advanced in Europe, Lansbury's pacifist stance drew criticism from the trade union elements of his party—who controlled the majority of party conference votes. Walter Citrine, the TUC general secretary, commented that Lansbury "thinks the country should be without defence of any kind ... it certainly isn't our policy." The party's 1935 annual conference took place in Brighton during October, under the shadow of Italy's impending invasion of Abyssinia. The national executive had tabled a resolution calling for sanctions against Italy, which Lansbury opposed as a form of economic warfare. His speech—a passionate exposition of the principles of Christian pacifism—was well received by the delegates, but immediately afterwards his position was destroyed by Ernest Bevin, the Transport and General Workers' Union leader. Bevin attacked Lansbury for putting his private beliefs before a policy, agreed by all the party's main institutions, to oppose fascist aggression, and accused him of "hawking your conscience round from body to body asking to be told what to do with it". Union support ensured that the sanctions resolution was carried by a huge majority; Lansbury, realising that a Christian pacifist could no longer lead the party, resigned a few days later. His deputy, Clement Attlee, succeeded him as party leader prior to the 1935 general election; Lansbury thus contested no general elections as party leader. As of 2023, he is the last Labour leader to stand down without contesting a general election.

== Final years ==
[Hitler] appeared free of personal ambition ... wasn't ashamed of his humble start in life ... lived in the country rather than the town ... was a bachelor who liked children and old people ... and was obviously lonely. I wished that I could have gone to Berchtesgaden and stayed with him for a little while. I felt that Christianity in its purest sense might have had a chance with him.

— (Lansbury's impressions after meeting Adolf Hitler in April 1937)

Lansbury was 76 years old when he resigned the Labour leadership; he did not, however, retire from public life. In the general election of November 1935 he kept his seat at Bow and Bromley; Labour, now led by Attlee, improved its parliamentary representation to 154. Lansbury devoted himself entirely to the cause of world peace, a quest that took him, in 1936, to the United States. He addressed large crowds in 27 cities before meeting President Roosevelt in Washington to present his proposals for a world peace conference. In 1937 he toured Europe, visiting leaders in Belgium, France and Scandinavia, and in April secured a private meeting with Hitler. No official report of the discussion was issued, but Lansbury's personal memorandum indicates that Hitler expressed willingness to join in a world conference if Roosevelt would convene it. Later that year Lansbury met Mussolini in Rome; he described the Italian leader as "a mixture of Lloyd George, Stanley Baldwin and Winston Churchill". Lansbury wrote several accounts of his peace journeys, notably My Quest for Peace (1938). His mild and optimistic impressions of the European dictators were widely criticised as naïve and out of touch; some British pacifists were dismayed at Lansbury's meeting with Hitler, while the Daily Worker accused him of diverting attention from the aggressive realities of fascist policies. Lansbury continued to meet European leaders through 1938 and 1939, and was nominated, unsuccessfully, for the 1940 Nobel Peace Prize.

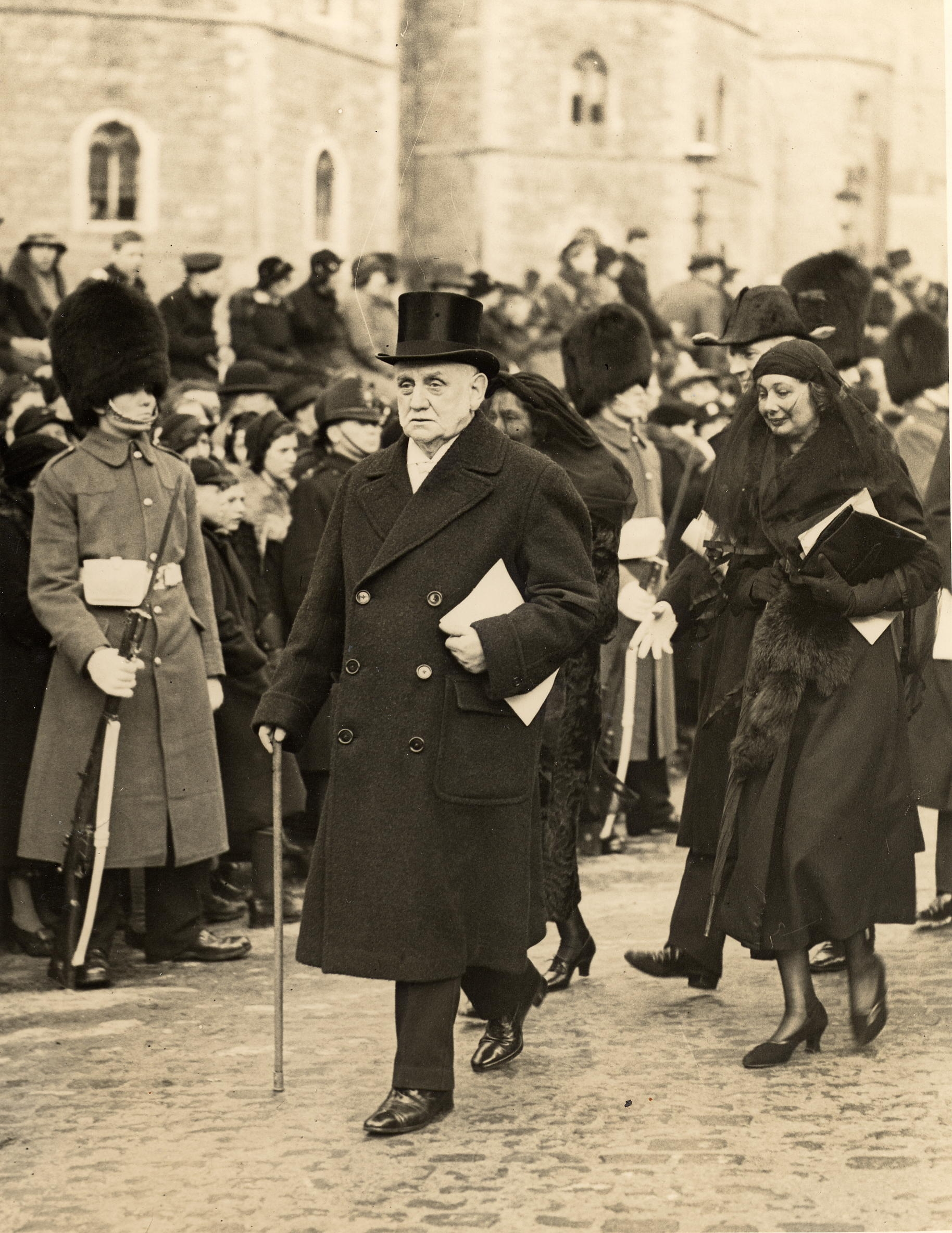
At the funeral of George V, 1936

At home, Lansbury served a second term as Mayor of Poplar, in 1936–37. He argued against direct confrontation with Mosley's Blackshirts during the October 1936 demonstrations known as the Battle of Cable Street. In October 1937 he became president of the Peace Pledge Union, and a year later he welcomed the Munich Agreement as a step towards peace. During this period he worked on behalf of refugees from Nazi Germany, and was chairman of the Polish Refugee Fund which provided relief to displaced Jewish children. On 3 September 1939, after Neville Chamberlain's announcement of war with Germany, Lansbury addressed the House of Commons. Observing that the cause to which he had dedicated his life was going down in ruins, he added: "I hope that out of this terrible calamity will arise a spirit that will compel people to give up the reliance on force."

Early in 1940 Lansbury's health began to fail; although unaware, he was suffering from stomach cancer. In an article published in the socialist magazine Tribune, published on 25 April 1940, he made a final statement of his Christian pacifism: "I hold fast to the truth that this world is big enough for all, that we are all brethren, children of one Father". Lansbury died on 7 May 1940, at the Manor House Hospital in Golders Green. His funeral in St Mary's Church, Bow, was followed by cremation at Ilford Crematorium, before a memorial service in Westminster Abbey. His ashes were scattered at sea, in accordance with the wish expressed in his will: "I desire this because although I love England very dearly ... I am a convinced internationalist".

== Tributes and legacy ==
Most historical assessments of Lansbury have tended to stress his character and principles rather than his effectiveness as a party political leader. His biographer Jonathan Schneer writes:

Lansbury was a talented politician, speaker, and organizer. What made him remarkable was the stubbornness with which he clung to his principles... [He] became one of the best-loved and most-respected figures in the labour movement. Lansbury's legacy has been the adamantine insistence among an element within the Labour Party that Britain must stand for moral principles, must set the world a moral example. Concretely, this has meant demanding the total abolition of capitalism and unilateral disarmament, policies that Labour's leaders have usually thought utopian or worse.

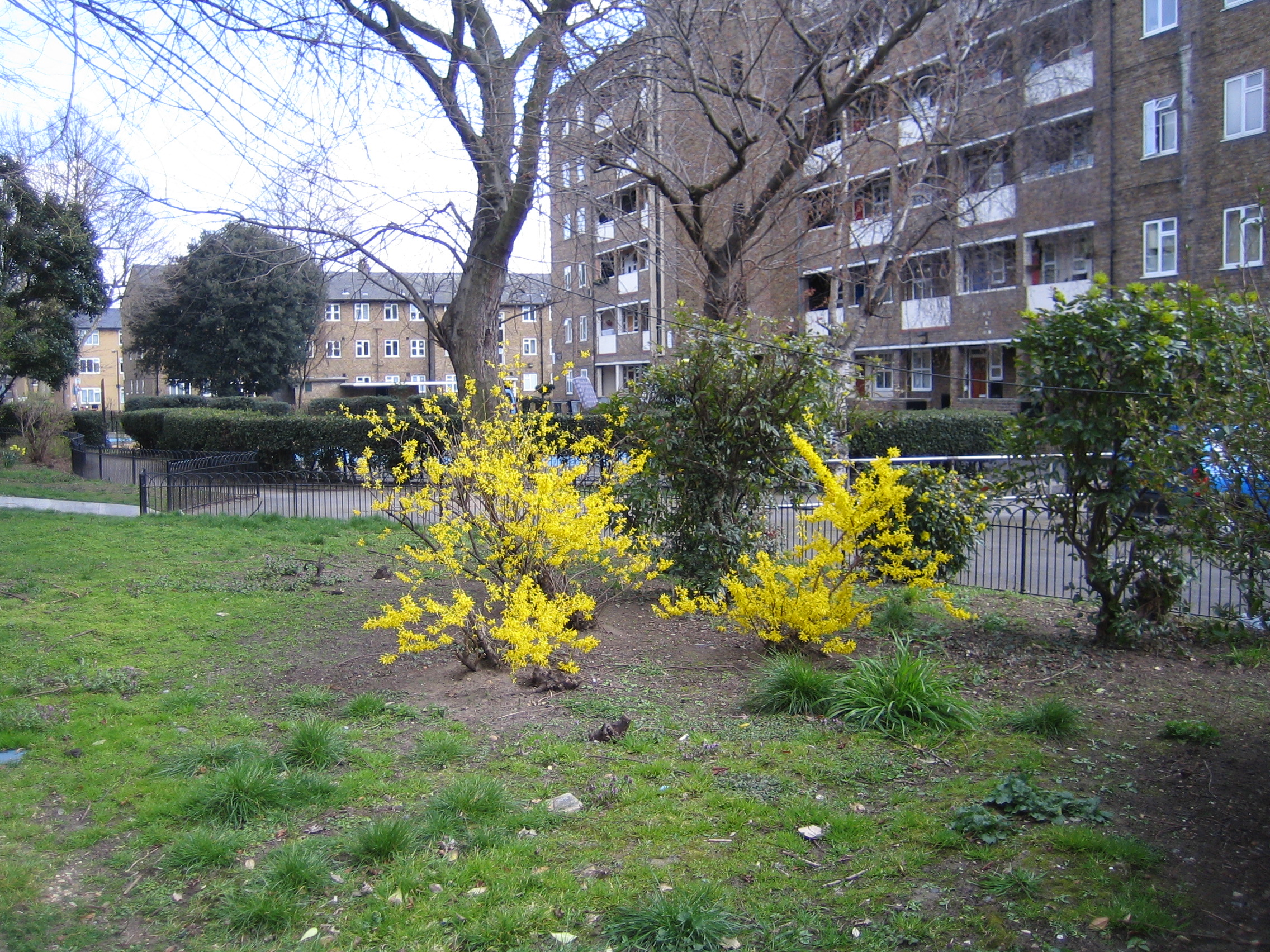
The Lansbury Estate, Poplar

Historian A. J. P. Taylor labelled Lansbury as "the most lovable figure in modern politics" and the outstanding figure of the English revolutionary left in the 20th century, while Kenneth O. Morgan, in his biography of a later Labour leader, Michael Foot, regards Lansbury as "an agitator of protest, not a politician of power". Journalists commonly accused Lansbury of sentimentality, and party intellectuals accused him of lacking mental capacity. Nevertheless, his speeches in the House of Commons were often flavoured with historical and literary allusions, and he left behind a considerable body of writing on socialist ideas; Morgan refers to him as a "prophet". Foot, who as a young man met and was influenced by Lansbury, was particularly impressed by the older man's achievements in establishing the Daily Herald, given his complete lack of journalistic training. Nevertheless, Foot felt that Lansbury's pacifism was unrealistic, and believed that Bevin's demolition at the 1935 conference was justified.

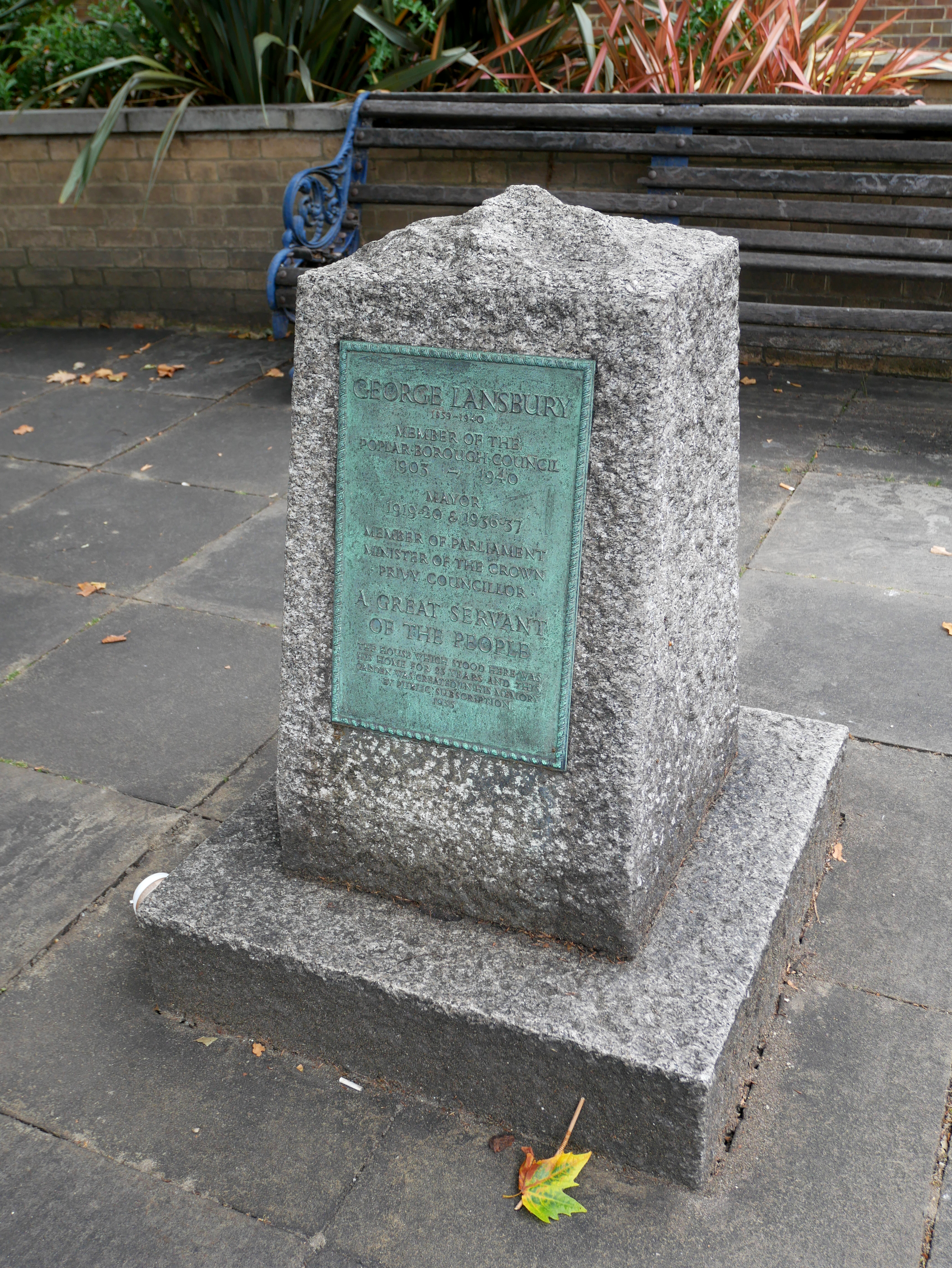
A stone memorial to Lansbury in Bow Road, Bow

There is much agreement among historians and analysts that Lansbury was never self-serving and, guided by his Christian socialist principles, was consistent in his efforts on behalf of the poorest in society. Shepherd believes that "there could have been no better leader for the Labour Party at the collapse of its political fortunes in 1931 than Lansbury, a universally popular choice and a source of inspiration among Labour ranks". In the House of Commons on 8 May 1940, the day following Lansbury's death, Chamberlain said of him: "There were not many hon. Members who felt convinced of the practicability of the methods which he advocated for the preservation of peace, but there was no one who did not realise his intense conviction, which arose out of his deep humanitarianism". Attlee also paid tribute to his former leader: "He hated cruelty, injustice and wrongs, and felt deeply for all who suffered ... [H]e was ever the champion of the weak, and ... to the end of his life he strove for that in which he believed".

After the Second World War, a stained glass window designed by the Belgian artist Eugeen Yoors was placed in the Kingsley Hall community centre in Bow, as a memorial to Lansbury. His memory is further sustained by streets and housing developments named after him, most notably the Lansbury Estate in Poplar, completed in 1951. Lansbury Park, a council estate in Caerphilly, Wales, is also named to commemorate him. A further enduring memorial, Attlee suggests, is the extent to which the then-revolutionary social policies that Lansbury began advocating before the turn of the 20th century had become accepted mainstream doctrine little more than a decade after his death.

His name and picture (and those of 58 other women's suffrage supporters) are on the plinth of the statue of Millicent Fawcett in Parliament Square, London, unveiled in 2018.

The George Lansbury Memorial Trust was founded in 2012, and organises an annual George Lansbury Memorial Lecture.

== Personal and family life ==
George Lansbury married Elizabeth Jane (Bessie) Brine on 22 May 1880 in Whitechapel, London. Four years later, in May 1884, he took his wife and their three young children to Australia as emigrants with high hopes based on British government propaganda, which suggested plentiful work and a rosy life there. The truth was otherwise, with paid work very hard to find, and terrible living conditions for many. By May 1885 they had had enough of Australia, and returned to London. Lansbury took up work in his father-in-law's Whitechapel sawmill and began his political career speaking about the harsh conditions in Australia.

For most of their married life, George and Bessie Lansbury lived in Bow, originally in St Stephen's Road and from 1916 at 39 Bow Road, a house which, Shepherd records, became "a political haven" for those requiring assistance of any kind. Bessie died in 1933, after 53 years of a marriage that had produced 12 children between 1881 and 1905.

Of the 10 children who survived to adulthood, Edgar followed his father into local political activism as a Poplar councillor in 1912, serving as the borough's mayor in 1924–25. He was for a time a member of the Communist Party of Great Britain (CPGB). After the death of his first wife Minnie in 1922, Edgar married Moyna Macgill, an actress from Belfast; their daughter Dame Angela Lansbury (1925–2022), became a stage and screen actress. George Lansbury's youngest daughter, Violet (1900–72), was an active CPGB member in the 1920s, who lived and worked as a translator in Moscow for many years. She married Clemens Palme Dutt, the brother of the Marxist intellectual Rajani Palme Dutt.

Another daughter, Dorothy (1890–1973), was a women's rights activist and later a campaigner for contraceptive and abortion rights. She married Ernest Thurtle, the Labour MP for Shoreditch, and was herself a member of Shoreditch council, serving as mayor in 1936. She and her husband founded the Workers' Birth Control Group in 1924. Dorothy's younger sister Daisy (1892–1971) served as Lansbury's secretary for over 20 years. During the suffragette protests in 1913 Daisy Lansbury helped Sylvia Pankhurst to evade police capture by disguising herself as Pankhurst. In 1918 she married the left-wing writer and historian Raymond Postgate, who was George Lansbury's first biographer, and founder of The Good Food Guide. Their son Oliver Postgate was a successful writer, animator and producer for children's television, and son John Postgate was a scientist and writer, latterly becoming Professor Emeritus of Microbiology at the University of Sussex. The former Conservative MP Penny Mordaunt is a distant relative of Lansbury.

The Lansbury home at 39 Bow Road was destroyed by bombing during the London Blitz of 1940–41. There is a small memorial stone dedicated to Lansbury in front of the current building, named George Lansbury House, which itself carries a memorial plaque. There is also a memorial to Lansbury in the nearby Bow Church, where Lansbury was a long-term member of the congregation and churchwarden.

== Books by Lansbury ==
- Your Part in Poverty. London: Allen and Unwin. 1918. OCLC 251051169.
- These Things Shall Be. London: Swarthorne Press. 1920. OCLC 1109879.
- What I Saw in Russia. London: L. Parsons. 1920. OCLC 457509320.
- The Miracle of Fleet Street: The Story of the Daily Herald. London: Labour Publishing Company. 1925. OCLC 477300787.
- My Life. London: Constable & Co. 1928. OCLC 2150486.
- My England. London: Selwyn & Blount. 1934. OCLC 2175404.
- Looking Backwards and Forwards. London and Glasgow: Blackie and Son. 1935. OCLC 9072833.
- Labour's Way with the Commonwealth. London: Methuen. 1935. OCLC 574874665.
- The Price of Peace. London: Fellowship of Reconciliation. 1935. OCLC 11084218.
- Why Pacifists Should Be Socialists. London: FACT. 1937. OCLC 826854352.
- My Quest for Peace. London: M. Joseph. 1938. OCLC 4051871.
- This Way to Peace. London: Rich and Cowan. 1940. OCLC 4024194.

== See also ==
- List of peace activists
- List of suffragists and suffragettes

== Sources ==
- Attlee, Clement (2009). Lansbury of London in Field, Frank: Attlee's Great Contemporaries – The Politics of Character. London: Continuum. pp. 1–3. ISBN 978-0-8264-3224-7.
- Blythe, Ronald (1964). The Age of Illusion: England in the Twenties and Thirties. Harmondsworth, UK: Penguin Books. OCLC 10971329.
- Boulton, David (1967). Objection Overruled. London: MacGibbon and Kee. OCLC 956913.
- Dilks, David (1984). Neville Chamberlain, Volume 1: Pioneering and Reform, 1869–1929. Cambridge: Cambridge University Press. ISBN 978-0-521-89401-2.
- Hollis, Patricia (1987). Ladies Elect: Women in English Local Government 1865–1914. Oxford: Oxford University Press. ISBN 0-19-822699-3.
- Holman, Bob (4 June 1990). Good Old George, The life of George Lansbury, Best-loved leader of the Labour party. Oxford: Lion Books. ISBN 0-7459-1574-4.
- Lansbury, George (1928). My Life. London: Constable and Co. OCLC 2150486.
- Morgan, Kenneth O. (2008). Michael Foot: A Life. London and New York: Harper Perennial. ISBN 978-0-00-717827-8.
- Nicolson, Harold (1967). King George V: His Life and Reign. London: Pan Books. OCLC 562582750.
- Postgate, Raymond (1951). The Life of George Lansbury. London: Longmans, Green. OCLC 739654.
- Prasad, Devi (2005). War is a crime against humanity : the story of War Resisters' International. London, UK: War Resisters' International. ISBN 0903517205.
- Schneer, Jonathan (1990). George Lansbury: Lives of the Left. Manchester, UK: Manchester University Press. ISBN 0-7190-2170-7.
- Schneer, Jonathan (January 1991). "Politics and Feminism in 'Outcast London': George Lansbury and Jane Cobden's Campaign for the First London County Council". Journal of British Studies. 30 (1): 63–82. doi:10.1086/385973. JSTOR 175737. S2CID 155015712. (subscription required)
- Shepherd, John (2002). George Lansbury: At the Heart of Old Labour. Oxford: Oxford University Press. ISBN 0-19-820164-8.
- Taylor, A.J.P. (1970). English History 1914–45. Harmondsworth, UK: Penguin Books. ISBN 0-14-021181-0.
- Vickers, Rhiannon (2003). The Labour Party and the World, Volume 1: The Evolution of Labour's Foreign Policy, 1900–51. Manchester, UK: Manchester University Press. ISBN 0-7190-6745-6.

Parliament of the United Kingdom
Preceded by Alfred Du Cros	Member of Parliament for Bow and Bromley; December 1910 – 1912	Succeeded by Reginald Blair
Preceded by Reginald Blair	Member of Parliament for Bow and Bromley; 1922–1940	Succeeded by Charles Key
Civic offices
Preceded by William Henry Lax	Mayor of Poplar; 1919–1920	Succeeded by Samuel March
Preceded by Albert Edward Easteal	Mayor of Poplar; 1936–1937	Succeeded by Ethel Mary Lambert
Political offices
Preceded by The Marquess of Londonderry	First Commissioner of Works; 1929–1931	Succeeded by The Marquess of Londonderry
Preceded by Arthur Henderson	Leader of the Opposition; 1931–1935	Succeeded by Clement Attlee
Party political offices
Preceded by E. Chatterton	Chair of the Social Democratic Federation; 1896	Succeeded by F. G. Jones
Preceded by Frederick Roberts	Chair of the Labour Party; 1927–1928	Succeeded by Herbert Morrison
Preceded by Arthur Henderson	Leader of the Labour Party; 1932–1935	Succeeded by Clement Attlee
Non-profit organization positions
Preceded by The Lord Ponsonby of Shulbrede	Chair of War Resisters' International; 1937–1940	Succeeded by Herbert Runham Brown
Media offices
Preceded by Charles Lapworth	Editor of the Daily Herald; 1913–1922	Succeeded by W. P. Ryan
