= Charles Key =

English schoolmaster and Labour politician (1883–1964)

The Right Honourable Charles Key
- Key in 1940

Minister of Works
- In office 10 February 1947 – 28 February 1950
- Prime Minister: Clement Attlee
- Preceded by: George Tomlinson
- Succeeded by: Richard Stokes

Parliamentary Secretary to the Ministry of Health
- In office 4 August 1945 – 12 February 1947
- Prime Minister: Clement Attlee
- Preceded by: Hamilton Kerr
- Succeeded by: John Edwards

Member of Parliament for Poplar Bow and Bromley (1940–1950)
- In office 12 June 1940 – 25 September 1964
- Preceded by: George Lansbury
- Succeeded by: Ian Mikardo

Personal details
- Born: 8 August 1883
- Died: 6 December 1964 (aged 81)
- Party: Labour

Charles William Key, PC (8 August 1883 – 6 December 1964) was a British schoolmaster and Labour Party politician. Coming from a very working-class background, the generosity of a family friend made it possible for him to get a start in life and train as a teacher; he entered politics through Poplar Borough Council, and was elected to Parliament to replace George Lansbury. Serving in junior posts during the Attlee government, he remained in Parliament until the age of 80.

== Poverty of upbringing ==
Key was born in Chalfont St Giles, Buckinghamshire, where his father worked in the brickfields. At the age of six, his father died and he was brought up by his mother alone; the family were very poor and not only did his mother have to work as a charlady, Key himself was needed to work on deliveries for a local draper. The family were largely dependent on poor relief under the Poor Law: in later life Key often remembered collecting 1s. 6d. and two quartern loaves of bread, being two-fifths of a pound. He claimed to have promised his mother at the age of nine that he would get into Parliament and repeal the Poor Law.

== Teaching profession ==
While Key was attending the village school, and doing well, his mother took in lodgers to help make ends meet. One of the lodgers was a young chemist, who decided to take responsibility for helping him develop his talent, and provided enough funds for Key to continue his education at the Mile End Pupil Teachers' Centre and to get practical training at a school in South Hackney. Key then won a Queen's Scholarship to go to the Borough Road Teacher Training College. There he qualified as a teacher and went into work in a school in Mile End.

== Municipal affairs ==
During the First World War, Key served in the Royal Garrison Artillery as a Corporal. After the war, he became Headmaster of schools in Hoxton and Poplar. While working in Poplar in 1919, Key (who had joined the Labour Party in 1906) was elected to Poplar Borough Council from Bromley North West ward, part of a Labour majority on the council.

Poplar was a very left-wing Labour council. Key was not among the most left-wing (he professed himself as a loyal subject of the King), but he was fully supportive of the campaign to improve the lives of the poor of the borough: in 1925 he was to write that most of the population "live on the verge of destitution". He saw the effects that poverty had on the children at his school. Poplar's high spending to help the poor led to ever-rising rates, which became an extra burden on local householders.

== Rates strike ==
In this situation, in 1921, the Poplar Labour councillors decided to act to relieve the burden and to make a political protest by refusing to collect the rates on behalf of the London County Council and other Metropolitan bodies. Key himself, as Chairman of the Public Health Committee, moved a resolution to refer the estimates back to delete the contribution to the LCC. Poplar had a legal duty to collect the rates, and the LCC obtained a judgment requiring payment. Key argued to continue the protest, because the LCC and government had failed to fund promised schemes in the borough.

To enforce payment, the LCC and Metropolitan Asylums Board issued writs against 30 Poplar councillors and Aldermen; however, somewhat inexplicably, Key was not among those proceeded against. The 30 were committed to prison, while Key was made Deputy Mayor to act in the absence of the Mayor (Sam March) who was to go to jail. He was a key organiser of the successful campaign to get the councillors released, and subsequently wrote pamphlets telling the history of the campaign. The rates strike secured a more effective system of easing the burden of LCC rates on poorer boroughs and making borough rates produce the same revenue for councils.

== Municipal service ==
Poplar held out on other causes, including a minimum wage for its workers of £4 per week; this policy was ruled unlawful by the House of Lords in 1925. Key moved a resolution to reluctantly comply, under protest, with the Lords' judgment. In the municipal years 1923–24, 1926–27 and 1932–33 he served as the Borough's Mayor, and he was also elected as a Poor Law Guardian in 1925, serving until the Guardians were abolished in 1931.

== Parliament ==
On the outbreak of war in 1939, Key left teaching to become a civil defence worker in London and deputy controller of civil defence in Poplar. When George Lansbury (Labour Member of Parliament (MP) for the Bow and Bromley division of Poplar) died in 1940, Key was elected at the Bow and Bromley by-election to follow him; he was opposed only by a Communist candidate in the byelection. From 1941 until the end of the war, Key was Regional Commissioner for the London Civil Defence region, with special responsibility for shelters.

== Government minister ==
In Clement Attlee's post-war government, Key was appointed Parliamentary Secretary to the Ministry of Health. He shared responsibility for passing the National Health Service Act with Aneurin Bevan; the contrast in their styles, with Bevan's exuberant manner of speech differing markedly from Key's homespun wisdom, was noted. Unfortunately it was Key's successor, John Edwards, who had the honour of finally abolishing the Poor Law.

== Minister of Works ==
In February 1947, Key was promoted to be Minister of Works, where he had to deal with the rebuilding of the House of Commons chamber and settling the layout of the Festival of Britain. He was appointed to the Privy Council in 1947, which entitled him to be referred to as "The Right Honourable Charles Key".

One of Key's responsibilities was to ensure a steady supply of building material for the building of public housing. In 1948 he made the acquaintance of fraudster Sidney Stanley and was consequently summoned to appear before the Lynskey Tribunal investigating corruption among Ministers. No accusation against him was substantiated. When the two Poplar constituencies were combined into one at the 1950 general election, Key was selected there and comfortably elected; however, he left the government immediately afterwards on grounds of age.

== Later career ==
In 1953 Key was awarded the Freedom of the Borough of Poplar, an award which made him very proud. He remained a backbench MP although his attendance and frequency of speeches declined; in 1963 he was one of the MPs highlighted by the television programme That Was the Week That Was for not having spoken at all in the Chamber since the 1959 general election. Key had announced his retirement in December 1961. He acted as a scrutineer in the ballot for the Labour Party leadership in 1963.

Parliament of the United Kingdom
Preceded by George Lansbury	Member of Parliament for Bow and Bromley; 1940–1950	Constituency abolished
New constituency	Member of Parliament for Poplar; 1950–1964	Succeeded by Ian Mikardo
Political offices
Preceded by Hamilton Kerr	Parliamentary Secretary to the Ministry of Health; 1945–1947	Succeeded by John Edwards
Preceded by George Tomlinson	Minister of Works; 1947–1950	Succeeded by Richard Stokes
Civic offices
Preceded by John Scurr	Mayor of Poplar; 1923–1924	Succeeded by Edgar Lansbury
Preceded by John Thomas Wooster	Mayor of Poplar; 1928–1929	Succeeded by Peter Hubbart
Preceded by George Joseph Cressall	Mayor of Poplar; 1932–1933	Succeeded by Albert Baker
