= Reginald Blair =

British politician

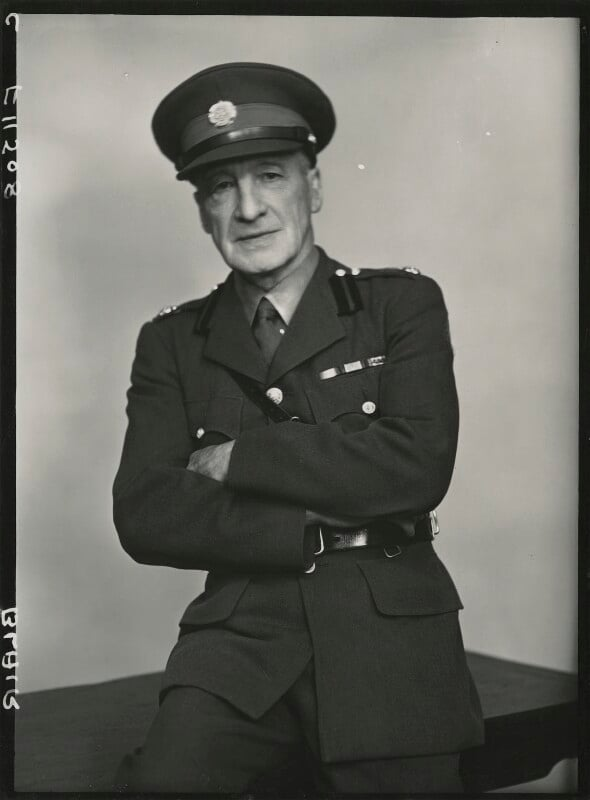
Blair in 1949

Sir Reginald Blair, 1st Baronet (8 November 1881 – 18 September 1962) was a British politician. He served as a Conservative Member of Parliament (MP) from 1912 to 1922, and from 1935 to 1945.

== Early life ==
Blair was born in Glasgow in 1881. He was educated at Kelvinside Academy and Glasgow University. Blair was married, and had a son Malcolm Reginald Blair, who died on 31 May 1940, aged 33, while on active service in World War II, and is buried at Oostduinkerke War Cemetery.

== Early career ==
Blair was first elected to Parliament through a by-election in the Bow and Bromley constituency on 26 November 1912. The by-election was caused by George Lansbury, the Labour MP, taking the Chiltern Hundreds, a way of resigning from the House of Commons. Lansbury caused the by-election to highlight the issue of women's suffrage, but the Labour Party did not endorse him as their candidate so he stood as an independent on a platform of "Votes for Women". Labour did not stand a candidate, and Blair won the by-election by a majority of 751 votes.

For the first two years of World War I, Blair served with the British Expeditionary Force and was mentioned in dispatches. From 1916 to 1918, he served as a field cashier with the temporary rank of Major. Reginald Blair held his seat in the 1918 general election, but was defeated in 1922 by Lansbury, who remained Bow and Bromley's MP until his death in 1940. Following his election defeat, Blair was knighted, and became the Chairman of the Racehorse Betting Control Board.

== Later career ==
In the 1935 general election, Reginald Blair was elected as MP for Hendon, succeeding the Conservative Philip Cunliffe-Lister. On 19 June 1945, he was created a baronet, of Harrow Weald in the County of Middlesex. His Hendon seat was abolished for the 1945 general election, and he retired. Reginald Blair died in 1962, aged 80. The baronetcy became extinct after his death.

Parliament of the United Kingdom
Preceded by George Lansbury	Member of Parliament for Bow and Bromley; 1912 – 1922	Succeeded by George Lansbury
Preceded by Philip Cunliffe-Lister	Member of Parliament for Hendon; 1935 – 1945	Constituency abolished
Baronetage of the United Kingdom
New creation	Baronet (of Harrow Weald); 1945–1962	Extinct
