= Stopford Brooke (politician) =

British politician (1859–1938)

Stopford W. W. Brooke
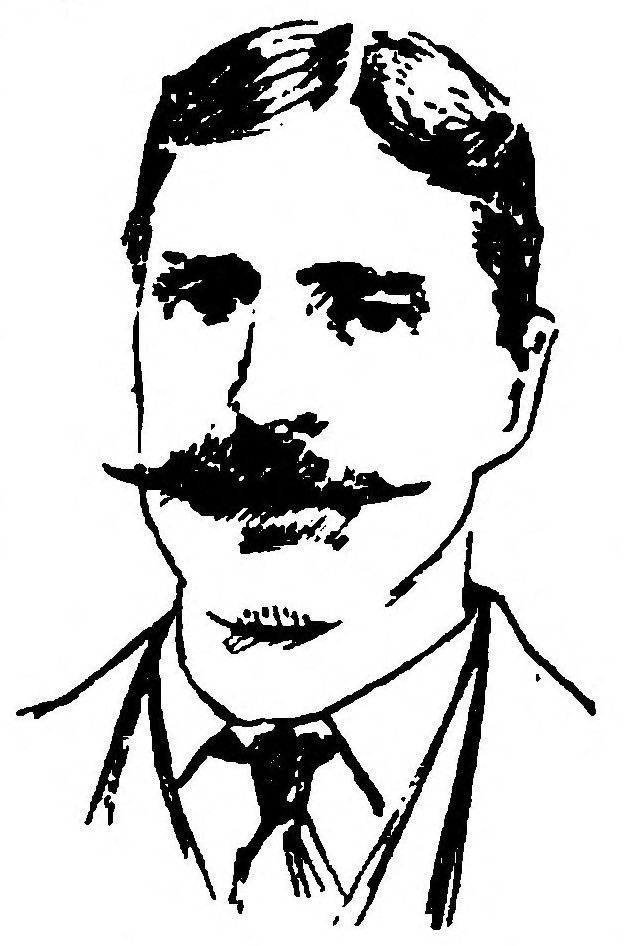
- Born: 1859; Kensington, London
- Died: 23 April 1938 (aged 78–79); Cranleigh, Surrey
- Education: Winchester College; University College, Oxford
- Political party: Liberal Party
- Children: Somerset Stopford Brooke
- Father: Stopford Brooke

Member of Parliament for Bow and Bromley
- In office 1906 – January 1910
- Preceded by: Walter Guthrie
- Succeeded by: Alfred Du Cros

Minister of First Church in Boston
- In office 1885–1898
- Preceded by: Rufus Ellis
- Succeeded by: James Eells

Stopford William Wentworth Brooke (1859 – 23 April 1938) was a British politician. He was a Liberal Member of Parliament (MP) from 1906 to 1910.

== Biography ==
Brooke was born in Kensington, London, the son of Stopford Brooke, an Irish clergymen, chaplain to Queen Victoria and writer, and his wife Emma (née Wentworth-Beaumont). He was educated at Winchester College and University College, Oxford, graduating in 1881. He was a Unitarian minister in England between 1883 and 1886 and then went to America where he was minister at the First Church (Unitarian) in Boston, Massachusetts. He married Helen Ellis from Boston in 1903. They had one son and a daughter. His wife died in 1928.

He was elected to the Commons in the 1906 general election, succeeding the Conservative MP Walter Guthrie in the Bow and Bromley constituency. He left Parliament in the January 1910 general election and was succeeded by the Conservative Alfred du Cros. He tried to re-enter Parliament at the December 1910 general election as a Liberal candidate at Bassetlaw in Nottinghamshire and was defeated by the sitting Unionist MP William Ellis Hume-Williams by a narrow 215 vote margin.

In 1934, Brooke, as Secretary and Treasurer of the Hurtwood Control Committee, raised £1,000 for bungalows to house gypsy families living in Hurtwood, Albury, Surrey.

Brooke died 23 April 1938 in Cranleigh, Surrey. His son, Somerset Stopford Brooke, also stood for Parliament as Liberal candidate in Guildford at the 1929 general election and as Liberal National in Shoreditch in 1935.

Parliament of the United Kingdom
Preceded by Walter Guthrie	Member of Parliament for Bow and Bromley; 1906 – January 1910	Succeeded by Alfred du Cros
