= Blair baronets =

Extinct baronetcy in the Baronetage of the United Kingdom

There have been two baronetcies created for persons with the surname Blair, one in the Baronetage of Nova Scotia and one in the Baronetage of the United Kingdom. Both creations are extinct.

The Blair Baronetcy, of Kinfauns in the County of Perth, was created in the Baronetage of Nova Scotia on 18 September 1666 for William Blair. The title became extinct on his death sometime after 1666.

The Blair Baronetcy, of Harrow Weald in the County of Middlesex, was created in the Baronetage of the United Kingdom on 19 June 1945 for the Conservative politician Sir Reginald Blair. The title became extinct on his death in 1962.

== Blair baronets, of Kinfauns (1666) ==
- Sir William Blair, 1st Baronet (died after 1666)

== Blair baronets, of Harrow Weald (1945) ==
- Sir Reginald Blair, 1st Baronet (1881–1962)

== See also ==
- Hunter-Blair baronets
