= Somerset Stopford Brooke =

British politician (1906–1976)

Somerset Stopford Brooke (16 June 1906 – 1976) was a Liberal and Liberal National politician.

The son of the Liberal MP Stopford Brooke, Somerset Stopford Brooke was the president of the Oxford University Liberal Club and President of the Oxford Union. He was the Liberal candidate in Guildford in Surrey at the 1929 general election. He came second to the sitting Conservative Henry Cecil Buckingham, trailing by 4,566 votes. Somerset Stopford Brooke made a second attempt to get into the House of Commons in 1935 when he stood as a Liberal National in Shoreditch. At the time of this election Brooke was described as a member of the stock-exchange.
