= Walter Guthrie =

British politician

Walter Murray Guthrie, DL (3 June 1869 – 24 April 1911) was a merchant banker and British politician. He was a Conservative member of parliament (MP) from 1899 to 1906.

== Biography ==
Walter Murray Guthrie was the third son of James Alexander Guthrie of Craigie, Director of the Bank of England, and Ellinor Stirling. He was born in London in 1869 and educated at Eton College and Trinity Hall, Cambridge. While at Cambridge, he worked on the literary paper Granta.

In 1894, he married Olive Louisa Blanche Leslie, daughter of Sir John Leslie, first Baronet of Glaslough, County Monaghan (Ireland), and Lady Constance Wilhelmina Frances Dawson-Damer, daughter of George Dawson-Damer. They had six children, of whom four survived infancy: Patrick Stirling, Bridget Mary Idol, David Leslie, and Virginia Violet Margaret.

He became a partner of Chalmers, Guthrie & Co., merchant bankers, and a director of the London Joint Stock Bank and Commercial Union Assurance Co.

In 1897, he inherited a castle on the Isle of Mull from an uncle. Originally known as Duart House, it was later called Torosay Castle. Guthrie made improvements and embellished the gardens with statues bought from an abandoned villa in Italy.

Guthrie was elected to the Commons in the 1899 Bow and Bromley by-election, defeating the Liberal candidate Harold Spender by 2,123 votes and succeeding the Conservative MP Lionel Holland. He kept the seat of Bow and Bromley in the general election the next year. He left Parliament in the 1906 general election and was succeeded by the Liberal Stopford Brooke.

In early 1900, he travelled to South Africa during the Second Boer War, and contributed to the Report of the Royal Commission on South African Hospitals.

Guthrie was a Deputy Lieutenant for the County of Argyll from June 1901. He was elected an Alderman for the Cornhill ward in London in December 1902.

He died at his home in Mull in 1911 aged 41. A memorial was erected to him in the gardens of Torosay Castle.

Parliament of the United Kingdom
Preceded by Lionel Holland	Member of Parliament for Bow and Bromley; 1899 – 1906 general election	Succeeded by Stopford Brooke
