= 1940 Bow and Bromley by-election =

British House of Commons by-election

The 1940 Bow and Bromley by-election, was a parliamentary by-election held on 12 June 1940 for the British House of Commons constituency of Bow and Bromley in the Metropolitan Borough of Poplar.

The seat became vacant when the constituency's Labour member of Parliament (MP), George Lansbury, died on 7 May 1940, aged 81. A leader of the Labour Party, he had held the seat since the 1922 general election, and previously from 1910 to 1912.

== Candidates ==
During World War II, the political parties in the coalition government agreed not to contest by-elections in seats held by the other parties in the coalition. The Labour Party selected as its candidate Charles Key, a local Alderman and leader of the Borough of Poplar. Key was a teacher, who left the classroom when war broke out to become the deputy controller of civil defence in Poplar.

His only opponent was Isabel Brown of the Communist Party of Great Britain. Brown had twice before been a Parliamentary candidate in Scotland (in Kilmarnock and Motherwell); she previously worked in the Ministry of Education in Moscow.

The British Union of Fascists intended to put up Mick Clarke as a candidate; this was abandoned when he became one of the first group of members rounded up under Defence Regulation 18B.

== Result ==
On a reduced turnout, Key held the seat for Labour with 95.8% of the votes. He remained Bow and Bromley's MP until the constituency was abolished for the 1950 general election, when he was elected as MP for the new Poplar constituency. He held that seat until 1964.

Bow and Bromley by-election, 12th June 1940
Party	Candidate	Votes	%	±%
Labour	Charles Key	11,594	95.8	+18.2
Communist	Isabel Brown	506	4.2	New
Majority		11,088	91.6	+3.6
Turnout		12,100	32.4	−27.1
Labour hold		Swing		

== See also ==
- 1912 Bow and Bromley by-election
- Bow and Bromley (UK Parliament constituency)
- Lists of United Kingdom by-elections

== Bibliography ==
- Craig, F. W. S. (1983) [1969]. British parliamentary election results 1918–1949 (3rd ed.). Chichester: Parliamentary Research Services. ISBN 0-900178-06-X.
- Cazalet-Keir, Thelma (1967) [1967]. From the Wings:An Autobiography (1st ed.). London: The Bodley Head.
- Leigh Rayment's Peerage Pages
