= 1912 Bow and Bromley by-election =

UK parliamentary by-election

← Dec. 1910	26 November 1912	1918 →

Constituency of Bow and Bromley
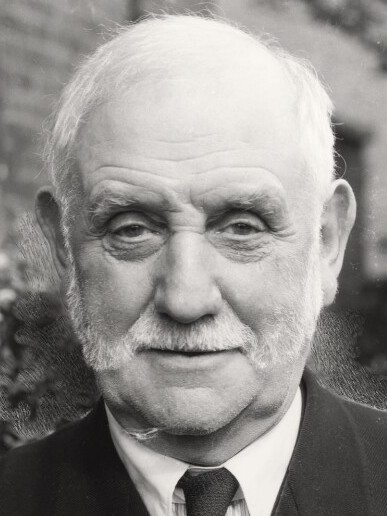
	First party	Second party
	Con
Candidate	Reginald Blair	George Lansbury
Party	Conservative	Independent Labour
Popular vote	4,042	3,291
Percentage	55.1%	44.9%
Swing	▲10.7%	▼10.7%
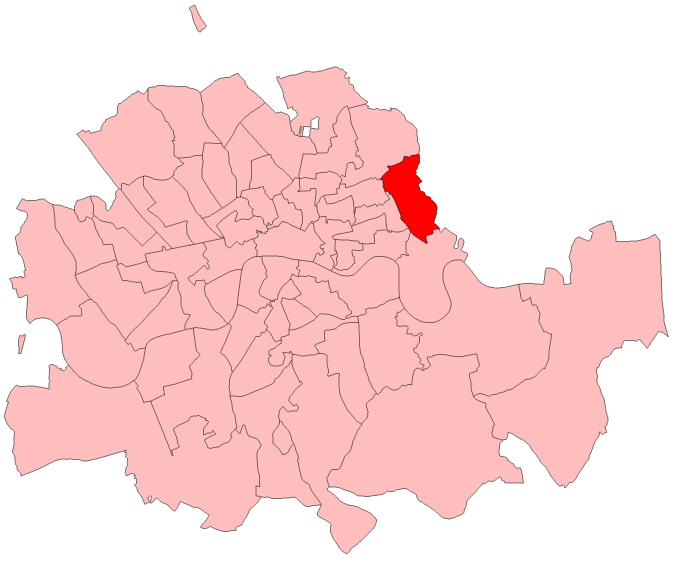
- A map of parliamentary constituencies within the County of London at the time of the by-election, with Bow and Bromley highlighted in red.
MP before election
George Lansbury
Labour
Subsequent MP
Reginald Blair
Conservative

The 1912 Bow and Bromley by-election was a by-election held on 26 November 1912 for the British House of Commons constituency of Bow and Bromley. It was triggered when the Labour Party Member of Parliament (MP), George Lansbury, accepted the post of Steward of the Chiltern Hundreds as a technical measure enabling him to leave Parliament.

== Background ==
Bow and Bromley was a marginal constituency. It had been held by the Liberal Party from 1906 until 1910 and by the Conservative Party from 1895 until 1906 and during 1910. At the general election of December 1910, Lansbury had gained the seat for Labour with a majority of 11.1%.

General election December 1910: Bow and Bromley
Party	Candidate	Votes	%	±%
Labour	George Lansbury	4,315	55.6	+22.1
Liberal Unionist	Leo Amery	3,452	44.4	+2.5
Majority		863	11.2	N/A
Turnout		7,767		
Labour gain from Conservative		Swing	+9.8	

Lansbury had become a strong supporter of women's suffrage. Unusually among male politicians of the time, he supported the actions of militant suffragettes such as the Women's Social and Political Union (WSPU). While support for women's suffrage was official Labour policy, Lansbury felt that this support was lukewarm, and so in October 1912 he travelled to Boulogne-sur-Mer with Emmeline Pankhurst, where he met WSPU leader Christabel Pankhurst.

== Campaign ==
Lansbury decided to resign his seat and contest the resulting by-election on a platform of "Votes for Women". He was unable to gain official Labour Party support, and instead ran as the "Women's Suffrage and Socialist" candidate. He was supported by his Constituency Labour Party (CLP), including J. H. Banks and Edgar Lansbury, by some prominent Labour figures including Keir Hardie and Philip Snowden, by Liberal Party MP Josiah Wedgwood and by journalist H. N. Brailsford. Millicent Fawcett, leader of the WSPU's rival the National Union of Women's Suffrage Societies also campaigned for Lansbury.

The WSPU were very active in supporting Lansbury in the by-election, but some tensions arose between them and the CLP. The WSPU were adamant that their campaign would not be controlled by a male-led organisation, while the local activists regarded them as outsiders. This in particular created problems on polling day, when WSPU cars were not made available to carry people to vote.

Sylvia Pankhurst's branch of the WSPU was on the same road as Lansbury's campaign headquarters. She supported his campaign, but was critical of him for standing prematurely, against counsel from the labour movement, and for prioritising women's suffrage above all other issues. Lansbury's manifesto did include other measures, including opposition to the National Insurance Bill and an explanation of his differences with the Labour leadership.

The campaign was widely covered by the official Labour newspaper the Daily Citizen and strongly supported by Lansbury's own recently launched paper the Daily Herald.

The Liberal Party's leadership opposed the militant activities of the WSPU by imprisoning its members. When some suffragettes went on hunger strike, it authorised force feeding. Lansbury strongly disagreed with this, and in Parliament in the summer of 1912, he told H. H. Asquith, the Liberal Prime Minister "You will go down in history as the man who tortured innocent women. You ought to be driven from public life." Despite this, the Liberals did not stand a candidate in the by-election. The Labour Party also declined to stand an official candidate, so Lansbury's only opponent was Reginald Blair of the Conservative Party. Blair was supported by the Primrose League and the National League for Opposing Woman Suffrage and campaigned under slogans including "Women Do Not Want Votes".

== Result ==
Blair took the seat from Lansbury with a majority of over 700 votes.

Bow and Bromley by-election, 1912
Party	Candidate	Votes	%	±%
Conservative	Reginald Blair	4,042	55.1	+10.7
Independent Labour	George Lansbury	3,291	44.9	–10.7
Majority		751	10.2	N/A
Turnout		7,333		
Conservative gain from Labour		Swing	+10.7	

Lansbury believed that his resignation had permanently alienated some of his constituents, and subsequently declared "Never Resign!"

== Aftermath ==
The Bow & Bromley Independent Labour Party disintegrated. Reginald Blair entered parliament to speak and vote on a number of issues, including voting against granting the vote to women in 1917. He held the seat until 1922, when Lansbury retook it. Lansbury meanwhile promoted socialism in the Daily Herald and led the Poplar Rates Rebellion of 1921. The WSPU moved away from Lansbury and became increasingly anti-socialist, while this was a decisive point in Sylvia Pankhurst's split from her family towards communism. The following year, her section of the WSPU became the East London Federation of Suffragettes.

== See also ==
- 1940 Bow and Bromley by-election
- UK by-election records
