= Bow and Bromley =

Parliamentary constituency in the United Kingdom, 1885–1950

- Former borough constituency for the House of Commons
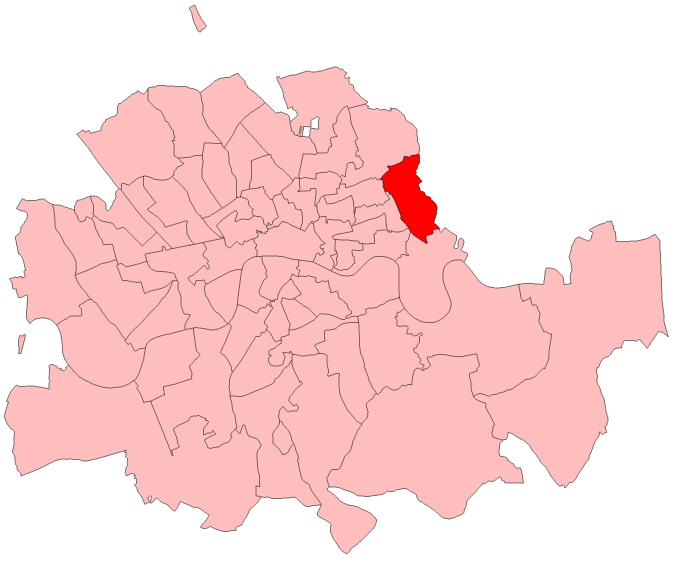
- Bow and Bromley in London 1885-1918

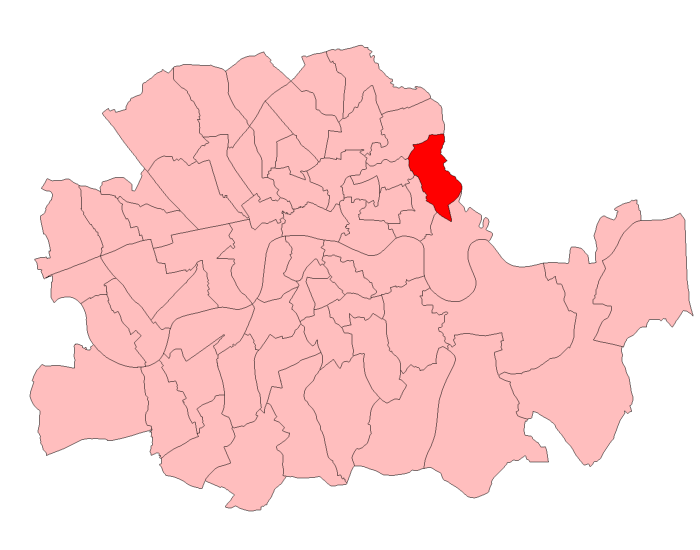
- Bow and Bromley in London 1918-50

1885–1950
- Seats: One
- Created from: Tower Hamlets
- Replaced by: Poplar

Bow and Bromley was a constituency in the Parliament of the United Kingdom. Located in the Metropolitan Borough of Poplar in London, it was created by the Redistribution of Seats Act for the 1885 general election and returned one Member of Parliament (MP) until it was abolished for the 1950 general election.

== History ==

The area had been part of the former two-seat Tower Hamlets constituency, which was divided at the 1885 general election.

The constituency was marginal before 1918. The party holding the seat changed in 1886, 1892, 1895, 1906, January 1910, December 1910 and 1912. After the extension of the franchise to all adult men and some women in 1918, the seat became a safe Labour seat from 1922.

George Lansbury was first elected in December 1910 as a Labour candidate. He was on the left-wing of the party and was known as a pacifist and supporter of votes for women. In November 1912, Lansbury resigned his seat so he could test public opinion on women's suffrage. He lost the subsequent by-election and did not regain the seat until 1922.

Lansbury was the only member of the cabinet of the Second Labour Ministry to both remain with the party and secure re-election at the 1931 general election. As the party leader Arthur Henderson was not in the House of Commons, Lansbury became Acting Leader of the Labour Party and Leader of the Opposition. In 1932, Henderson resigned the leadership and Lansbury was elected leader in his place. He retained the leadership until 1935.

== Boundaries ==
In 1885 the area was administered as part of The Metropolis. It was located in the Tower division, in the east of the county of Middlesex. The neighbourhoods of Bow and Bromley were combined to form a division of the parliamentary borough of Tower Hamlets. The parliamentary division was part of suburban East London. The Bromley in this seat is not the same place as Bromley in Kent after which the Bromley constituency, created in 1918, was named.

In 1889 the Tower division of Middlesex was severed from the county. It became part of the County of London. In 1900 the lower tier of local government in London was re-modelled. Bow and Bromley became part of the Metropolitan Borough of Poplar.

When a re-distribution of parliamentary seats took place in 1918, the constituency became a division of Poplar. It comprised the wards of Bow Central, Bow North, Bow South, Bow West, Bromley North East, Bromley North West, and Bromley South West.

== Members of Parliament ==
- Constituency created (1885)

Year	Member	Party
1885	William Robson	Liberal
1886	Sir John Colomb	Conservative
1892	John Macdonald	Liberal
1895	Lionel Holland	Conservative
1899	Walter Guthrie	Conservative
1906	Stopford Brooke	Liberal
1910 Jan.	Alfred du Cros	Conservative
1910 Dec.	George Lansbury	Labour
1912	Reginald Blair	Unionist
1922	George Lansbury	Labour
1940	Charles Key	Labour

- Constituency abolished (1950)

== Election results ==
=== Elections in the 1880s ===
Robson

General election 1885: Tower Hamlets, Bow and Bromley
Party	Candidate	Votes	%	±%
Liberal	William Robson	3,419	55.5	N/A
Conservative	John Colomb	2,738	44.5	N/A
Majority		681	11.0	N/A
Turnout		6,157	69.3	N/A
Registered electors		8,887		
Liberal win (new seat)				

General election 1886: Tower Hamlets, Bow and Bromley
Party	Candidate	Votes	%	±%
Conservative	John Colomb	2,967	55.3	+10.8
Liberal	William Robson	2,396	44.7	−10.8
Majority		571	10.6	N/A
Turnout		5,363	60.3	−9.0
Registered electors		8,887		
Conservative gain from Liberal		Swing	+10.8	

=== Elections in the 1890s ===
Macdonald

General election 1892: Tower Hamlets, Bow and Bromley
Party	Candidate	Votes	%	±%
Liberal	John Macdonald	4,072	52.7	+8.0
Conservative	John Colomb	3,649	47.3	−8.0
Majority		423	5.4	N/A
Turnout		7,721	72.2	+11.9
Registered electors		10,687		
Liberal gain from Conservative		Swing	+8.0	

Holland

General election 1895: Tower Hamlets, Bow and Bromley
Party	Candidate	Votes	%	±%
Conservative	Lionel Holland	4,339	57.7	+10.4
Liberal	John Macdonald	3,178	42.3	−10.4
Majority		1,161	15.4	N/A
Turnout		7,517	71.0	−1.2
Registered electors		10,588		
Conservative gain from Liberal		Swing	+10.4	

Spender

1899 Bow and Bromley by-election
Party	Candidate	Votes	%	±%
Conservative	Walter Guthrie	4,238	66.6	+8.9
Liberal	Harold Spender	2,123	33.4	−8.9
Majority		2,115	33.2	+17.8
Turnout		6,361	55.8	−15.2
Registered electors		11,401		
Conservative hold		Swing	+8.9	

=== Elections in the 1900s ===
General election 1900: Tower Hamlets, Bow and Bromley
Party	Candidate	Votes	%	±%
Conservative	Walter Guthrie	4,403	63.3	+5.6
Labour Repr. Cmte.	George Lansbury	2,558	36.7	New
Majority		1,845	26.6	+11.2
Turnout		6,961	61.7	−9.3
Registered electors		11,278		
Conservative hold		Swing	N/A	

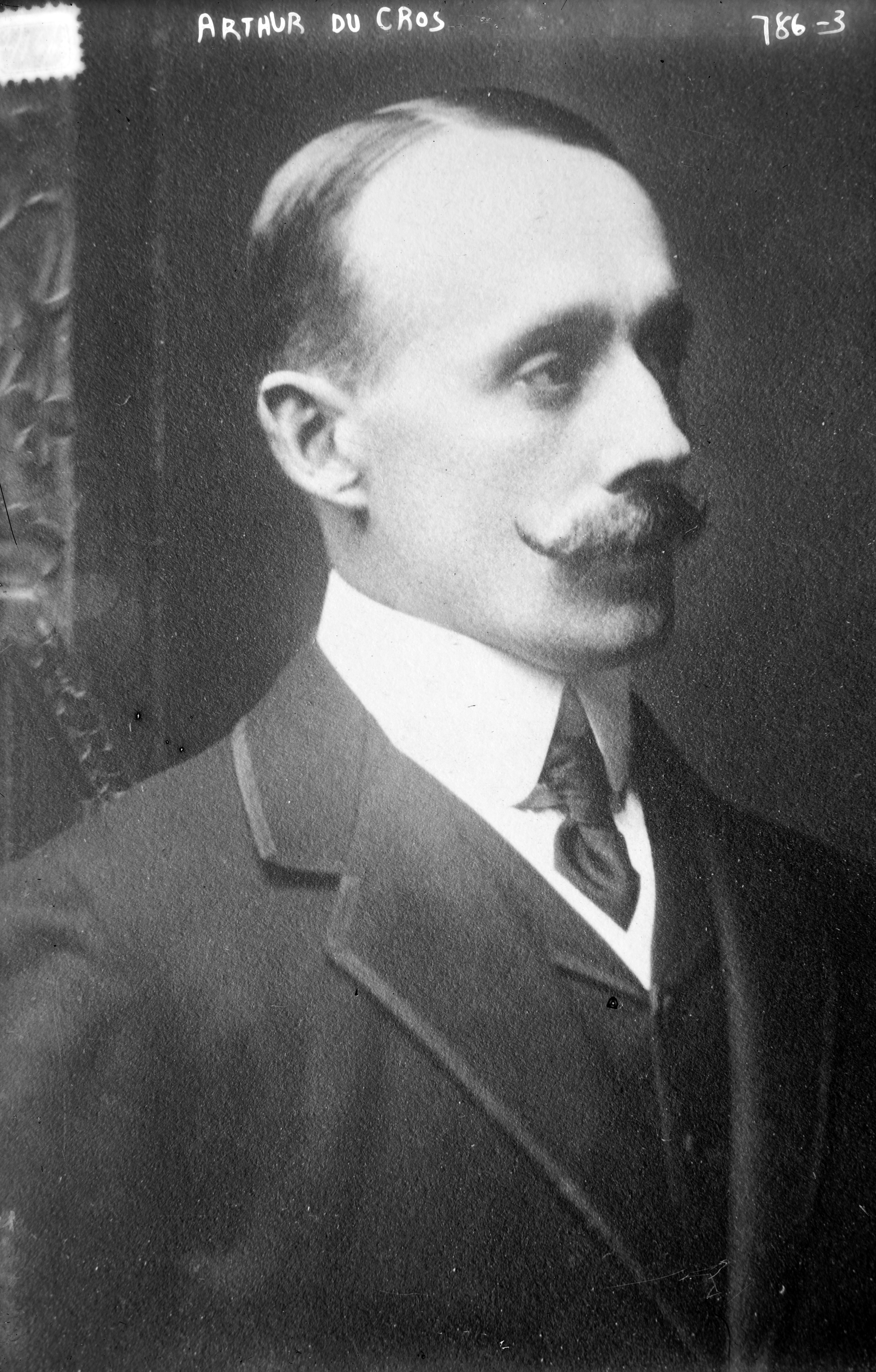
du Cros

General election 1906: Tower Hamlets, Bow and Bromley
Party	Candidate	Votes	%	±%
Liberal	Stopford Brooke	4,596	53.6	N/A
Conservative	Arthur du Cros	3,974	46.4	−16.9
Majority		622	7.2	N/A
Turnout		8,570	81.3	+19.6
Registered electors		10,545		
Liberal gain from Conservative		Swing	N/A	

=== Elections in the 1910s ===
General election January 1910: Tower Hamlets, Bow and Bromley
Party	Candidate	Votes	%	±%
Conservative	Alfred du Cros	3,695	41.9	−4.5
Labour	George Lansbury	2,955	33.5	New
Liberal	Stopford Brooke	2,167	24.6	−29.0
Majority		740	8.4	N/A
Turnout		8,817		
Conservative gain from Liberal				

General election December 1910: Tower Hamlets, Bow and Bromley
Party	Candidate	Votes	%	±%
Labour	George Lansbury	4,315	55.6	+22.1
Liberal Unionist	Leo Amery	3,452	44.4	+2.5
Majority		683	11.2	N/A
Turnout		7,767		
Labour gain from Conservative		Swing	+9.8	

1912 Bow and Bromley by-election
Party	Candidate	Votes	%	±%
Unionist	Reginald Blair	4,042	55.1	+10.7
Independent Labour	George Lansbury	3,291	44.9	−10.7
Majority		751	10.2	N/A
Turnout		7,333		
Unionist gain from Labour		Swing	+10.7	

General election 1918: Poplar, Bow and Bromley
Party		Candidate	Votes	%	±%
C	Unionist	Reginald Blair	8,109	49.7	−5.9
	Labour	George Lansbury	7,248	44.3	−0.1
	Liberal	Mark Dalton	988	6.0	New
Majority			861	5.4	N/A
Turnout			16,345	48.9	
	Unionist gain from Labour		Swing	-2.4	
C indicates candidate endorsed by the coalition government.

=== Elections in the 1920s ===
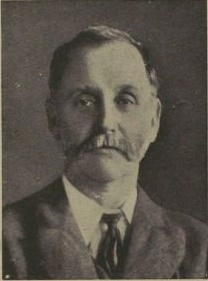
Lansbury

General election 1922: Poplar, Bow and Bromley
Party	Candidate	Votes	%	±%
Labour	George Lansbury	15,402	64.1	+19.8
Unionist	Geoffrey Duveen	8,626	35.9	−13.8
Majority		6,776	28.2	N/A
Turnout		24,028	69.9	+21.0
Registered electors		34,383		
Labour gain from Unionist		Swing	+16.8	

General election 1923: Bow and Bromley
Party	Candidate	Votes	%	±%
Labour	George Lansbury	15,336	68.8	+4.7
Unionist	Irving Albery	6,941	31.2	−4.7
Majority		8,395	37.6	+9.4
Turnout		22,277	63.7	−6.2
Registered electors		34,975		
Labour hold		Swing	+4.7	

General election 1924: Bow and Bromley
Party	Candidate	Votes	%	±%
Labour	George Lansbury	15,740	61.6	−7.2
Unionist	H.A. Hill	9,806	38.4	+7.2
Majority		5,934	23.2	−14.4
Turnout		25,546	72.1	+8.4
Registered electors		35,446		
Labour hold		Swing	−7.2	

General election 1929: Bow and Bromley
Party	Candidate	Votes	%	±%
Labour	George Lansbury	20,119	69.4	+7.8
Unionist	Albert Goodman	8,852	30.6	−7.8
Majority		11,267	38.8	+15.6
Turnout		28,971	66.1	−6.0
Registered electors		43,834		
Labour hold		Swing	+7.8	

=== Elections in the 1930s ===
General election 1931: Poplar, Bow and Bromley
Party	Candidate	Votes	%	±%
Labour	George Lansbury	16,306	58.3	−11.1
Conservative	D.L.R. Guthrie	11,642	41.7	+11.1
Majority		4,664	16.6	−22.2
Turnout		27,948	63.8	−2.3
Labour hold		Swing	-11.1	

General election 1935: Poplar, Bow and Bromley
Party	Candidate	Votes	%	±%
Labour	George Lansbury	19,064	77.0	+18.7
Conservative	Harold Ernest Weber	5,707	23.0	−18.7
Majority		13,357	54.0	+37.4
Turnout		24,771	59.5	−4.3
Labour hold		Swing	+18.7	

=== Elections in the 1940s ===
1940 Bow and Bromley by-election
Party	Candidate	Votes	%	±%
Labour	Charles Key	11,594	95.8	+18.8
Communist	Isabel Brown	506	4.2	New
Majority		11,088	91.6	+37.6
Turnout		12,100	32.4	−27.1
Labour hold				

General election 1945: Poplar, Bow and Bromley
Party	Candidate	Votes	%	±%
Labour	Charles Key	10,982	84.1	+7.1
Conservative	Charles Kenneth Duthie	2,075	15.9	−7.1
Majority		8,907	68.2	+14.2
Turnout		13,057	62.7	+3.2
Labour hold				
