= Lionel Holland =

British politician (1865 – 1936)

- Holland in 1895
- Born: 22 March 1865
- Died: 25 May 1936 (aged 71)
- Education: Harrow School; King's College, Cambridge
- Occupation: politician

Lionel Raleigh Holland (22 March 1865 – 25 May 1936) was a British politician, the youngest son of Henry Holland, 1st Viscount Knutsford. He was elected as a Conservative Member of Parliament for Bow and Bromley in 1895. He resigned in 1899 by becoming Steward of the Manor of Northstead.

Holland was educated at Harrow School and King's College, Cambridge, where he was one of the founders of Granta. He was called to the Bar by the Inner Temple in 1889. During the First World War, he served with the Red Cross in France and in the Ministry of Munitions.

He was director of a number of mining and exploration companies.

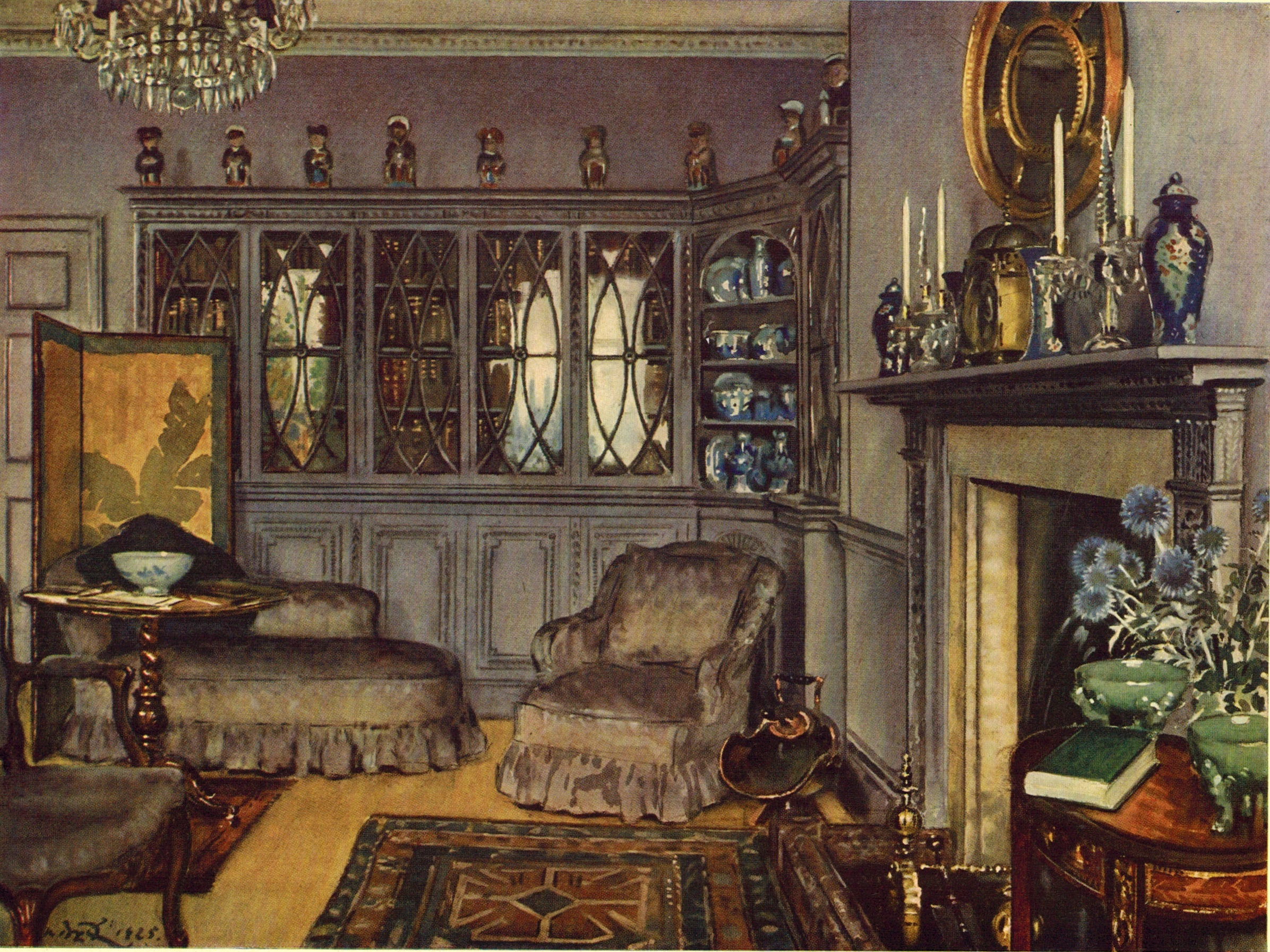
A Grey Room, Hon. Lionel Holland's House, Colour and Interior Decoration, Country Life, 1926

Represented Westminster on the London County Council 1895–8.

Parliament of the United Kingdom
Preceded by John Macdonald	Member of Parliament for Bow and Bromley; 1895–1899	Succeeded by Walter Guthrie
