= Second MacDonald ministry =

Government of the United Kingdom from 1929 to 1931

- 1929–1931
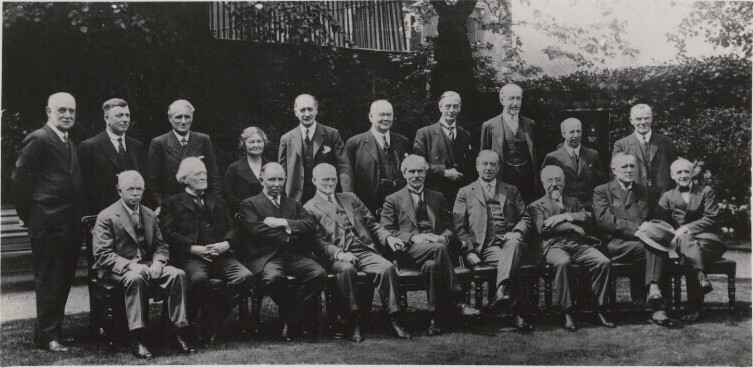
- MacDonald's cabinet in 1929
- Date formed: 5 June 1929
- Date dissolved: 24 August 1931

People and organisations
- Monarch: George V
- Prime Minister: Ramsay MacDonald
- Prime Minister's history: 1929–1935
- Deputy Prime Minister: (Note: J. R. Clynes never acquired the title of Deputy Prime Minister of the United Kingdom. He did however serve as deputy leader of the Labour Party.)
- Total no. of members: 86 appointments
- Member party: Labour Party
- Status in legislature: Minority dependent on Liberal support
- Opposition party: Conservative Party
- Opposition leaders: Stanley Baldwin in the House of Commons; Lord Salisbury (1929–1930); Lord Hailsham (1930–1931) in the House of Lords

History
- Election: 1929 general election
- Legislature terms: 35th UK Parliament
- Predecessor: Second Baldwin ministry
- Successor: First National Government

The second MacDonald ministry was formed by Ramsay MacDonald on his reappointment as prime minister of the United Kingdom by King George V on 5 June 1929. It was the second time the Labour Party had formed a government; the first MacDonald ministry held office in 1924.

== Background ==
The 1929 general election resulted in a hung parliament, with no party achieving an overall majority of seats. Labour was the largest party with 287 seats, while the Conservative Party won the largest number of votes overall. This discrepancy between seat count and popular vote was caused by the electoral system of first-past-the-post, and also the constituency boundaries, which were largely unchanged since the Representation of the People Act 1918. King George V invited Ramsay MacDonald back to form his second government.

The defeat of the Conservative Party has been attributed to its failure to reduce high unemployment, criticism of its handling of the General Strike, and the animosity caused by the Trade Disputes and Trade Unions Act 1927. For Labour, the election results were significant in that it not only became the largest party for the first time, but made inroads in county seats (a largely unexpected outcome), while also capturing London seats like Acton and Romford for the first time. Altogether, Labour gained 28 seats in Greater London. It also performed well in Lancashire and Cheshire, with its representation increasing from 26 to 44 seats.

Both MacDonald and Baldwin shared a dislike for David Lloyd George, with the two of them agreeing during the election campaign when their paths crossed at Crewe that it was desirable “to keep the Welshman (Lloyd George) out.” Despite this, Lloyd George agreed to support the government, but noted that "the very hour the Ministry becomes a Socialist administration its career ends."

In what was described as a “novel publicity stunt,” MacDonald named his team in front of talkie cameras which had been admitted into the garden at Downing Street.

Ideologically, the cabinet MacDonald appointed was for the most part a moderate one, with only one left-winger (George Lansbury) appointed. Its makeup was also similar to the 1924 cabinet, with 12 out of 19 cabinet ministers having served in the first, while four had held minor office in 1924.

== Social policy ==
Various reforms were carried out during the Labour government's time in office such as the Coal Mines Act 1930 (20 & 21 Geo. 5. c. 34), which provided for a 7 1/2-hour daily shift in mines. Owners were guaranteed minimum coal prices through compulsory production quotas among collieries, thus doing away with cut-throat competition. This solution was introduced to prevent a fall in miners' wages. The act introduced a philanthropic cartel replacing the coal merchants' oligopoly to allocate production quotas by control of a central council, while a Mines Reorganisation Commission was established to encourage efficiency through amalgamations. Many mine owners defied these provisions due to Labour's lack of enforcement powers.

The Land Utilisation Bill of 1931 would have given ministers sweeping powers to purchase land nationwide (to be run by local authorities and other such bodies). It was mauled by the House of Lords and had no backing from the Treasury so reduced to limited powers to improve agricultural productivity and provide and subsidise smallholdings to the unemployed and agricultural workers, as the Agricultural Land (Utilisation) Act 1931 (21 & 22 Geo. 5. c. 41). Other legislation introduced include the Agricultural Marketing Act 1931 (21 & 22 Geo. 5. c. 42) (which established a board to fix prices for produce), Greenwood's Housing Act 1930 (20 & 21 Geo. 5. c. 39) (which provided subsidies for slum clearance) and the London Transport Bill 1931 — this was passed by a subsequent National government as the London Passenger Transport Act 1933 (23 & 24 Geo. 5. c. 14). The Housing Act 1930 resulted in the demolition of 245,000 slums by 1939, and the construction of 700,000 new homes. The Housing Act 1930 also allowed local authorities to set up differential rent schemes, with rents related to the incomes of the tenants concerned.

Immediate measures carried out by the government upon taking office included the Development (Loan Guarantees and Grants) Act 1929 (20 & 21 Geo. 5. c. 7) authorising grants up to £25 million and a further £25 million in guarantees for public works schemes designed to reduce unemployment, the parallel Colonial Development Act 1929 (20 & 21 Geo. 5. c. 5) authorising grants up to £1 million a year for schemes in the colonies, a measure continuing at the existing levels the subsidies under the Housing Acts, which the Conservatives had threatened to reduce, and a removal of the appointed Guardians whom the Conservatives had put in office in place of the elected Boards in Bedwellty, Chester-le-Street, and Westham.

Expenditure on the insurance fund was raised as a means of ensuring that unemployed persons would not be reduced so quickly to poor relief. The Unemployment Insurance Act 1929 (20 & 21 Geo. 5. c. 3) scrapped the "genuinely seeking work" clause in unemployment benefit, increased dependants' allowances, extended provision for the long-term unemployed, relaxed eligibility conditions, and introduced an individual means test. The Unemployment Insurance Act 1930 (20 & 21 Geo. 5. c. 16) re-drafted the terms of benefit, so as to remove the major part of the grievance relating to the disqualification of persons alleged to be "not genuinely seeking work", which led to greater numbers of people acquiring unemployment assistance. It also increased insurance benefits for certain classes of unemployed who had been on a very low scale, and included a provision that (except in trade disputes) claims for benefits could no longer be disallowed except on the authority of a Court of Referees. Altogether, an estimated 170,000 people were brought into benefit by the combined exchanges in the act. As a result of the changes made by the government to unemployment benefit provision, the number of people on transitional benefits (payments given to those who had either exhausted their unemployment insurance benefits or did not qualify for them) rose from 120,000 in 1929 to more than 500,000 in 1931.

A scheme for training unemployed workers who had little chance of being reabsorbed into their previous occupations was extended, while arrangements were made whereby youths who were helping to support their families out of unemployment pay could live at either the training centres (or lodgings in the vicinity) and have a special remittance of 9 shillings a week made to their homes. In addition, the provision of instruction for unemployed boys and girls between the ages of 14 and 18 was extended. To improve safety standards at sea, an international conference was convened by the Labour President of the Board of Trade, which led to 27 governments signing a convention establishing for the first time uniform safety rules for all the cargo ships throughout the world. Conditions for soldiers were improved, while the death penalty for certain offences was abolished. A seven-year limit in connection with war pensions was also removed, while a programme for afforestation was increased.

The Widows', Orphans' and Old Age Contributory Pensions Act 1925 (15 & 16 Geo. 5. c. 70) was amended to cover some hundreds of thousands of additional pensioners, under improved conditions, with the inclusion of widows between the ages of 55 and 70. Other measures carried out in 1929–30 included the Road Traffic Act 1930 (20 & 21 Geo. 5. c. 43), which introduced third-party insurance to compensate for property damage and personal injury, made better provisions for road safety, provided greater freedom to municipalities to run omnibus services, applied the principle of the Fair Wage Clause to all employees on road passenger services, and placed a statutory limit on the working hours of drivers), the Land Drainage Act (which provided some degree of progress in river management), the Public Works Facilities Act 1930 (20 & 21 Geo. 5. c. 50) (conferring easier borrowing powers), the Workmen's Compensation (Silicosis and Asbestosis) Act 1930 (20 & 21 Geo. 5. c. 29) (which established disability compensation for asbestos) and the Mental Treatment Act 1930 (20 & 21 Geo. 5. c. 23).

A town and country planning act gave local authorities more power to control local and regional planning, while the Housing (Rural Authorities) Act 1931 (21 & 22 Geo. 5. c. 39) provided a sum of £2 million to help the poorer rural districts which were willing but unable to fulfil their housing responsibilities. In addition, an act passed by the previous Conservative government providing assistance towards the improvement of privately owned cottages for land workers was extended for another five years. To protect farm workers from exploitation, additional inspectors were appointed in 1929 to investigate "cases of refusal to pay minimum wages," and as a result of the work carried out by these investigators, wage arrears were recovered for 307 workers with the space of a few months. In addition, levels of support for war veterans and family members were expanded.

In education, various measures were introduced to promote equality and opportunity. More generous standards of school-planning were secured, while special attention was given to the provision of adequate accommodation for practical work. The number of "black-listed" schools was reduced from about 2,000 to about 1,500. From 1929 to 1931, the number of certified teachers in service was increased by about 3,000, while the number of classes with more than 50 children was reduced by about 2,000. Capital expenditure on elementary school building approved by the Board of Education during 1930–1931 stood at over £9 million, more than double the amount approved during 1928–29, the Conservative government's last year in office. In addition, an annual grant to the universities was increased by £250,000. Various military reforms were carried out, with the raising of the minimum age of enrolment into Officers' Training Corps from 13 to 15, the abolition of the death penalty for certain offences, and the modification of the disciplinary code "in the direction of clemency."

A circular was issued that urged the need for an expansion of provisions for the health and welfare of children under the compulsory school age by the development of nursery schools and other services, and by April 1931, the amount of accommodation available in nursery schools was doubled. The number of staff in the school medical services was increased, while about 3,000 new places were provided in day and residential special schools for crippled or blind children and in open-air schools for delicate children. There was also a large increase in the number of meals supplied to school children, while support given by the government to the National Milk Publicity Council's scheme for supplying milk to children resulted in 600,000 children benefiting daily from this service. Technical education was developed and arrangements were made for co-operation between technical colleges and industry, while new regulations facilitated an expansion of adult education. In addition, the government increased the number of free places that local education authorities could offer to 50%.

The National Health Insurance (Prolongation of Insurance) Act 1930 (21 & 22 Geo. 5. c. 5) extended provision of health insurance to unemployed males whose entitlement had run out, while the Poor Prisoners' Defence Act 1930 (20 & 21 Geo. 5. c. 32) introduced criminal legal aid for appearances in magistrates' courts. The Housing (Scotland) Act 1930 (20 & 21 Geo. 5. c. 40). A number of measures were also introduced to improve standards of health and safety in the workplace. As a means of improving industrial hygiene, regulations were introduced on 1 June 1931 that prescribed measures of hygiene for establishments engaged in electrolytic chromium plating, while regulations introduced on 28 April 1931 dealt with conditions in the refractory materials industries. On 24 February 1931, special regulations were issued by the Home Office for the prevention of accidents in the shipbuilding industry. The Hairdressers' and Barbers' Shops (Sunday Closing) Act 1930 (20 & 21 Geo. 5. c. 35) (which came into force in January 1931) provided for the compulsory closing of hairdressers and barbers shops on Sundays and with certain exceptions provided that "no person may carry on the work of a hairdresser on Sunday." An order of February 1930 prescribed protective measures for cement workers, while an order of May 1930 contained provisions concerning the protection of workers in tanneries. The Reservoirs (Safety Provisions) Act, 1930 imposed safety precautions to be observed in the building and use of reservoirs, while the Sea Fisheries Regulation (Expenses) Act of 1930 provided for (as noted by one study) “the payment of travelling expenses incurred by members of local fisheries committees.” Several regulations were also issued in regards to oil cake mills, chromium plating, refractory materials, shipbuilding, and sugar factories as a means of ensuring safe and healthy working conditions. In addition, the Education (Scotland) Act of 1930 gave local authorities the right (where appropriate) to provide additional milk rations.

The Poor Law Act 1930 (20 & 21 Geo. 5. c. 17) also encouraged local authorities (in the words of one study) "to work with a local voluntary group to find suitable employment for deaf people." The lid was kept on the (then) ever present risk of a naval arms race, while the system of naval officer recruitment was reformed to make it less difficult for working-class sailors to secure promotion from the ranks. George Lansbury, the First Commissioner of Works, sponsored a "Brighter Britain" campaign and introduced a number of facilities in London parks such as mixed bathing, boating ponds, and swings and sandpits for children. A number of other initiatives were undertaken by the Office of Works, including extensions in the amenities of the parks and palaces under its charge, and the spending of thousands of pounds on various improvements for the preservation of memorials across the country, as characterised by the restoration of a castle at Porchester near Portsmouth.

In Scotland, various welfare initiatives were carried out by the Scottish Office. Medical services in the Highlands and Islands were extended and stabilised, while limits imposed by a previous Conservative administration on the scale of Poor Law relief were scrapped, along with a system of offering the Poor House "as test for able-bodied men who have been out of work for a long period."

== Foreign policy ==
During Labour's time in office several foreign policy initiatives were undertaken. In 1929, the government signed the Statute of the Permanent Court of International Justice, pledging (as noted by one study) “to restore most disputes to court’s arbitration.” Diplomatic relations with the Soviet Union, which the previous Conservative government broke, were restored, and in 1930 a commercial agreement with that nation was signed. The government also agreed to the Young Plan on German reparations after a guaranteed £2 million payment to Britain was negotiated. Under this plan, German reparations were cut by 20%. In addition, the government evacuated British troops from the Rhineland. A Boxer Indemnity dispute with China was settled, and a treaty with Iraq was made that provided for self-government for the latter and its admission as a League of Nations member. MacDonald also paid a visit to the States which did much (as noted by one historian) “to heal the rift caused by disagreements over Britain’s war debts to the U.S.A.”

A policy of disarmament was pursued, with the government convening a naval disarmament conference in London. A three-power agreement was reached between Britain, America and Japan in which the latter, according to one study, “had the right to build up to 70 per cent of British or American total tonnage in cruisers, destroyers and submarines, with parity at a low level in the latter.” The conference resulted in the five-part London Naval Treaty. The first part of the Treaty provided for what was termed a “holiday” in the building of battle ships between 1931 and 1936 while the second part laid down various restrictions on the building of submarines. The third part contained the three-power agreement between Britain, America and Japan, and included (as noted by one authority) “an escape clause allowing them to build more if their national security were threatened by the building of any other power.” Restrictions were placed on submarine warfare by the fourth part, while the fifth part provided for the Treaty to remain in force until December 1936. In the spirit of general disarmament, the government suspended work on a base in Singapore. MacDonald summed up what he regarded as the achievements of the conference, in a speech before the signing ceremony:

We have stopped the replacement of battleships and reduced their numbers. We have limited the tonnage of auxiliary craft. We have shown how the equipment, the building and the replacement of fleets can be brought within the realm of international order. We have proved how, when the world likes, the menace of arms can be removed by treaties regulating their development. True, the work has been but partially done, but all great advances of this kind must be in stages, and we have gone much further than has as yet been possible…We must just go on strengthening the new mentality of peace and applying it, step by step, in further and further reductions.

MacDonald also had a particular interest in India, where there was not only disorder but a growth in nationalist sentiment. He was supportive of India being granted Dominion status, although this was in contrast with several Indian political figures who favoured independence. Following the 1930 Salt March, the Indian colonial administration jailed Mahatma Gandhi, the president of the Indian Congress Party and 54,000 other participants in the belief that the disorder would cease as a result. In November 1930, MacDonald convened the first of three Round Table conferences in London to speak about the future of India’s government. As noted by one historian, however, “Congress party members refused to attend it while many of their comrades still languished in jail.” In the Second Round Table Conference held the following autumn, however, Gandhi and the Congress took part; agreeing to end the civil disobedience campaign while the government for its part pledged (as noted by one study) “to release the remaining prisoners, to cease prosecutions of nonviolent protestors, and to remove ordinances targeting the Congress’s activities.” Weeks before the Conference started, however, the Labour government fell.

== Economic policy ==
A number of progressive economic measures were also undertaken under Labour. The 1930 budget provided for largely increased expenditure, contained measures to prevent tax evasion, raised the standard rate of income tax as well as the surtax while making concessions to the smaller taxpayer. Changes were made to the taxation system that resulted in the poor paying less tax and the rich paying more, while protective duties were reduced together with expenditure on armaments. An extra graduated surtax on large incomes was also applied while death duties on large estates were increased. These measures, however, along with the government's numerous social reforms, were arguably overshadowed by the government's failure to tackle the effects of the Great Depression, which left mass unemployment in its wake. The cabinet had 3 potential options for tackling the Depression, including safeguarding the home markets via the imposition of a tariff on imports to Britain, big investment in public works to boost employment and raise tax revenues, or lowering the budget deficit via deflation while also reducing unemployment benefit.

Spending on public works was accelerated, although this proved to be inadequate in dealing with the problem. By January 1930, 1.5 million people were out of work, a number which reached almost 2 million by June, and by December it topped 2.5 million. The Lord Privy Seal J. H. Thomas, who was put in charge of the problem of unemployment, was unable to offer a solution, while Margaret Bondfield also failed to come up with an imaginative response. Other members of the cabinet, however, put forward their own proposals for dealing with the Depression.

George Lansbury proposed land reclamation in Great Britain, a colonising scheme in Western Australia, and pensions for people at the age of sixty, while Tom Johnston pushed for national relief schemes such as the construction of a road round Loch Lomond (Johnston was successful in getting a coach road from Aberfoyle to the Trossachs rebuilt). These and similar schemes, however, failed in the Unemployment Committee (a group composed of Thomas and his assistants Johnston, Lansbury, and Oswald Mosley to develop a solution to the unemployment problem), where the four ministers received negative responses to their proposals from the top civil servants from the various government departments. Frustrated by the government's economic orthodoxy (a controversial policy upheld by the fiscally conservative Chancellor, Philip Snowden), Mosley submitted an ambitious set of proposals for dealing with the crisis (aimed mainly at combating unemployment) to the Labour Cabinet in what became known as "Mosley's Memorandum". These included developing social services such as through the provision of allowances for children, a tax on luxuries, a higher school-leaving age, much greater use of credit to finance development through the public control of banking, rationalisation of industry under public ownership, British agricultural development, import restrictions and bulk purchase agreements with foreign (particularly Imperial) producers, protection of the home market by tariffs, and higher pensions and allowances to encourage earlier retirement from industry and to increase purchasing power. As noted by one observer, Mosley also called for Cabinet reform, “favouring a small but powerful executive, to be assisted by a ‘think tank’ of key economists and scientists.” Although MacDonald was sympathetic to some of Mosley's proposals, they were rejected by Snowden and other members of the Cabinet, which led Mosley to resign in frustration in May 1930.One criticism of the Memorandum was that it would impose (as noted by one observer) “a central bureaucracy on the democratic traditions of local government.”

Snowden rejected the Memorandum on what he saw as its abandonment of Free Trade, the inconsistency of its banking policy with gold standard economics, and its cost. A fear also existed amongst ministers, as noted by one historian, “that any scheme such as widespread public works which increased expenditure and therefore the budget deficit would only make it harder to maintain the exchange value of the pound.” Snowden, as noted by one historian,

believed fanatically that a balanced budget was the greatest contribution which a government could make to overcoming the Depression, and did not hesitate at the resistance this would provoke in his own party-indeed, he relished the prospect of being again an unpopular and heroic figure.

MacDonald did not agree with Snowden’s ‘’hard dogmatism expressed in words & tones as hard as the ideas,’’ but at the same time was not in accord with ‘’all this humbug of curing unemployment by Exchequer grants.’’ The government continued to adhere to an orthodox economic course, as characterised by the controversial decision of Margaret Bondfield to push through Parliament an Anomalies Act, aimed at stamping out apparent "abuses" of the unemployment insurance system. This legislation limited the rights of short-time, casual and seasonal workers and of married women to claim unemployment benefit, which further damaged the reputation of the government amongst Labour supporters. Bondfield was caught between the financial orthodoxy of Snowden, the critics of cuts on Labour's backbenches and the baying for even more cuts on the Opposition benches, and in the end she ended up satisfying none of them.

== Fall of the government ==
In the summer of 1931, the government was gripped by a political and financial crisis as the value of the pound and its place on the gold standard came under threat over fears that the budget was unbalanced. A run on gold began when the May Report estimated that there would be a deficit of £120 million by April 1932, and recommended reductions in government expenditure and higher taxes.

MacDonald's cabinet met repeatedly to work out the necessary cutbacks and tax rises, while at the same time seeking loans from overseas. It later became clear that the bankers in New York would only provide loans if the government carried out significant austerity measures, such as a 10% reduction in unemployment benefits. Although MacDonald asserted to the press that the administration was ‘of one mind’ in balancing the budget, the Cabinet struggled to produce budget amendments that were politically acceptable but proved unable to do so without causing mass resignations and a full-scale split in the party. The particular issue on which the split occurred was the vote of the cabinet after much discussion to reduce benefit paid to unemployed people. The Cabinet was unable to reach an agreement on this controversial issue, with nine members opposing the reduction in the dole and eleven supporting it. MacDonald subsequently stated that he would see the king and request a conference of party leaders, and after collecting the resignations of everyone’s signature headed off to see him. MacDonald reflected on this final Labour cabinet discussion as follows:

Consternation when I reported, but in the meantime news of terrible run on Bank. It was plain that I should be left almost alone with Snowden, Thomas, Sankey. “Finis” is being written. They chose the easy path of irresponsibility & leave the burden to others. Henderson I knew, but as regards some others, I have once more experienced weak human nature.

Although MacDonald intended to resign, the King made an appeal to him to stay on and head a multiparty coalition which MacDonald agreed to; believing this would be a temporary arrangement. Returning to Downing Street, MacDonald attended what would be the Labour cabinet’s last meeting, informing members of what had been discussed. Herbert Morrison later reflected on this meeting as such:

The Cabinet had been called & waited for the Prime Minister to return to No. 10 Downing Street. We were standing around the Cabinet Room, silent, each of us with our own thoughts. The big double doors which ensure absolute secrecy for Cabinet deliberations made it impossible for us to hear approaching footsteps, with the result that before we knew it the Prime Minister was in the room…without preamble and hardly waiting for us to take our places, he calmly informed us that the King had invited him to form a National government, or a government of the personalities in which he was to be the Prime Minister. He brusquely told us that he had accepted His Majesty’s commission. He added to his nonplussed colleagues that the National government would not last long. He said that they would confine themselves within quite a short period to rectification of the financial situation, to effecting the necessary economies, & then they would resign. We were all shocked & those of us who had no intention of going along with MacDonald felt we had been badly let down.

The Second Labour Government was succeeded by the First National Ministry, also headed by Ramsay MacDonald and made up of members of Labour, the Conservatives and Liberals, calling itself a National Government. Viewed by many Labour supporters as a traitor, MacDonald was subsequently expelled from the Labour Party. In a private letter, Sidney Webb expressed his belief that MacDonald had not only had the idea of a National Government in his mind for some time, but had come “to dislike almost every section of the Labour party, for one or other reason.” In reality, MacDonald believed his had put national needs above his party’s needs, and that without the austerity cuts the foreign loans would not arrive, thus ruining the nation to the detriment of both those in work and out of work. MacDonald expected that once the crisis had passed he would return to Labour but this didn’t happen. He remained a hated figure within the Labour Party for many years thereafter, despite his great services to his party earlier in his life.

The circumstances surrounding the downfall of the Second Labour Government, together with its replacement by the National Government and its failure to develop a coherent economic strategy for dealing with the effects of the Great Depression, remained controversial amongst historians for many years.

== Cabinet ==
=== June 1929 – August 1931 ===
- Ramsay MacDonald – Prime Minister and Leader of the House of Commons
- Lord Sankey – Lord Chancellor
- Charles Cripps, 1st Baron Parmoor – Lord President of the Council and Leader of the House of Lords
- J. H. Thomas – Lord Privy Seal
- Philip Snowden – Chancellor of the Exchequer
- J. R. Clynes – Home Secretary
- Arthur Henderson – Foreign Secretary
- Sidney Webb, 1st Baron Passfield – Secretary of State for the Colonies and Secretary of State for Dominion Affairs
- Thomas Shaw- Secretary of State for War
- William Wedgwood Benn – Secretary of State for India
- Christopher Birdwood Thomson, 1st Baron Thomson – Secretary of State for Air
- William Adamson – Secretary of State for Scotland
- A. V. Alexander – First Lord of the Admiralty
- William Graham – President of the Board of Trade
- Sir Charles Trevelyan, 3rd Baronet – President of the Board of Education
- Noel Buxton – Minister of Agriculture
- Margaret Bondfield – Minister of Labour
- Arthur Greenwood – Minister of Health
- George Lansbury – First Commissioner of Works

==== Changes ====
- June 1930 – J.H. Thomas succeeds Lord Passfield as Dominions Secretary. Passfield remains Colonial Secretary. Vernon Hartshorn succeeds Thomas as Lord Privy Seal. Christopher Addison succeeds Noel Buxton as Minister of Agriculture
- October 1930 – Lord Amulree succeeds Lord Thomson as Secretary of State for Air
- March 1931 – H.B. Lees-Smith succeeds Sir C.P. Trevelyan at the Board of Education. Herbert Morrison enters the cabinet as Minister of Transport. Thomas Johnston succeeds Hartshorn as Lord Privy Seal

== List of ministers ==
Members of the Cabinet are in bold face.

Office	Name	Date
Prime Minister First Lord of the Treasury Leader of the House of Commons	**Ramsay MacDonald**	5 June 1929 – 24 August 1931
Lord Chancellor	**John Sankey, 1st Baron Sankey**	7 June 1929
Lord President of the Council Leader of the House of Lords	**Charles Cripps, 1st Baron Parmoor**	7 June 1929 – 24 August 1931
Lord Privy Seal	**James Henry Thomas**	7 June 1929
Lord Privy Seal	**Vernon Hartshorn**	5 June 1930
Lord Privy Seal	**Thomas Johnston**	24 March 1931
Chancellor of the Exchequer	**Philip Snowden** (Note: Retained post during Macdonald's National Government.)	7 June 1929 – 5 November 1931
Parliamentary Secretary to the Treasury	Tom Kennedy	14 June 1929
Financial Secretary to the Treasury	Frederick Pethick-Lawrence	11 June 1929
Lords of the Treasury	Charles Edwards	11 June 1929 – 13 March 1931
Lords of the Treasury	John Parkinson	11 June 1929 – 1 March 1931
Lords of the Treasury	Alfred Barnes	11 June 1929 – 23 October 1930
Lords of the Treasury	William Whiteley	27 June 1929 – 24 August 1931
Lords of the Treasury	Wilfred Paling	27 June 1929 – 24 August 1931
Lords of the Treasury	Ernest Thurtle	23 October 1930 – 24 August 1931
Lords of the Treasury	Henry Charleton	13 March 1931 – 23 August 1931
Secretary of State for Foreign Affairs	**Arthur Henderson**	7 June 1929 – 24 August 1931
Parliamentary Under-Secretary of State for Foreign Affairs	Hugh Dalton	11 June 1929
Secretary of State for the Home Department	**John Robert Clynes**	7 June 1929
Under-Secretary of State for the Home Department	Alfred Short	11 June 1929
First Lord of the Admiralty	**A. V. Alexander**	7 June 1929
Parliamentary and Financial Secretary to the Admiralty	Charles Ammon	11 June 1929
Civil Lord of the Admiralty	George Hall	11 June 1929
Minister of Agriculture and Fisheries	**Noel Buxton**	7 June 1929
Minister of Agriculture and Fisheries	**Christopher Addison**	5 June 1930
Parliamentary Secretary to the Ministry of Agriculture and Fisheries	Christopher Addison	11 June 1929
Parliamentary Secretary to the Ministry of Agriculture and Fisheries	Herbrand Sackville, 9th Earl De La Warr	5 June 1930
Secretary of State for Air	**Christopher Thomson, 1st Baron Thomson**	7 June 1929
Secretary of State for Air	**William Mackenzie, 1st Baron Amulree**	14 October 1930
Under-Secretary of State for Air	Frederick Montague	11 June 1929
Secretary of State for the Colonies	**Sidney James Webb, 1st Baron Passfield**	7 June 1929
Under-Secretary of State for the Colonies	William Lunn	11 June 1929
Under-Secretary of State for the Colonies	Drummond Shiels	1 December 1929
Secretary of State for Dominion Affairs	**Sidney James Webb, 1st Baron Passfield**	7 June 1929
Secretary of State for Dominion Affairs	**James Henry Thomas**	5 June 1930
Under-Secretary of State for Dominion Affairs	Arthur Ponsonby	11 June 1929
Under-Secretary of State for Dominion Affairs	William Lunn	1 December 1929
President of the Board of Education	**Sir Charles Trevelyan, 3rd Baronet**	7 June 1929
President of the Board of Education	**Hastings Lees-Smith**	2 March 1931
Parliamentary Secretary to the Board of Education	Morgan Jones	11 June 1929
Minister of Health	**Arthur Greenwood**	7 June 1929
Parliamentary Secretary to the Ministry of Health	Susan Lawrence	11 June 1929
Secretary of State for India	**William Wedgwood Benn**	7 June 1929
Under-Secretary of State for India	Drummond Shiels	11 June 1929
Under-Secretary of State for India	John Russell, 2nd Earl Russell	1 December 1929
Under-Secretary of State for India	Harry Snell, 1st Baron Snell	13 March 1931
Minister of Labour	**Margaret Bondfield**	7 June 1929
Parliamentary Secretary to the Ministry of Labour	Jack Lawson	11 June 1929
Chancellor of the Duchy of Lancaster	Sir Oswald Mosley	7 June 1929
Chancellor of the Duchy of Lancaster	Clement Attlee	23 May 1930
Chancellor of the Duchy of Lancaster	Arthur Ponsonby, 1st Baron Ponsonby of Shulbrede	13 March 1931
Paymaster General	Sydney Arnold, 1st Baron Arnold	7 June 1929
Paymaster General	vacant	6 March 1931
Minister of Pensions	Frederick Roberts	7 June 1929
Parliamentary Secretary to the Ministry of Pensions	vacant	
Postmaster General	Hastings Lees-Smith	7 June 1929
Postmaster General	Clement Attlee	2 March 1931
Assistant Postmaster General	Samuel Viant	7 July 1929
Secretary of State for Scotland	**William Adamson**	7 June 1929
Under-Secretary of State for Scotland	Thomas Johnston	7 June 1929
Under-Secretary of State for Scotland	Joseph Westwood	25 March 1931
President of the Board of Trade	**William Graham**	7 June 1929
Parliamentary Secretary to the Board of Trade	Walter Robert Smith	11 June 1929
Secretary for Overseas Trade	George Gillett	7 July 1929
Secretary for Mines	Ben Turner	1 June 1929
Secretary for Mines	Emanuel Shinwell	5 June 1930
Minister of Transport	Herbert Morrison (Note: Entered the Cabinet 19 March 1931.)	7 June 1929
Parliamentary Secretary to the Ministry of Transport	John Russell, 2nd Earl Russell	11 June 1929
Parliamentary Secretary to the Ministry of Transport	Arthur Ponsonby (Note: Created Baron Ponsonby of Shulbrede on 17 January 1930.)	1 December 1929
Parliamentary Secretary to the Ministry of Transport	John Parkinson	1 March 1931
Secretary of State for War	**Thomas Shaw**	7 June 1929
Under-Secretary of State for War	Herbrand Sackville, 9th Earl De La Warr	11 June 1929
Under-Secretary of State for War	Dudley Aman, 1st Baron Marley	5 June 1930
Financial Secretary to the War Office	Emanuel Shinwell	11 June 1929
Financial Secretary to the War Office	William Sanders	5 June 1930
First Commissioner of Works	**George Lansbury**	7 June 1929
Attorney General	Sir William Jowitt	7 June 1929
Solicitor General	Sir James Melville	7 June 1929
Solicitor General	Sir Stafford Cripps	22 October 1930
Lord Advocate	Craigie Aitchison	17 June 1929
Solicitor General for Scotland	John Charles Watson	17 June 1929
Vice-Chamberlain of the Household	John Henry Hayes	24 June 1929
Treasurer of the Household	Ben Smith	24 June 1929
Comptroller of the Household	Thomas Henderson	24 June 1929
Lords in Waiting	Herbrand Sackville, 9th Earl De La Warr	18 July 1929 – 24 August 1931
Lords in Waiting	Kenneth Muir Mackenzie, 1st Baron Muir Mackenzie	18 July 1929 – 22 May 1930

== Notes ==
Preceded by Second Baldwin ministry	Government of the United Kingdom; 1929–1931	Succeeded by First National Government
