= Second Baldwin ministry =

Government of the United Kingdom

- 1924–1929
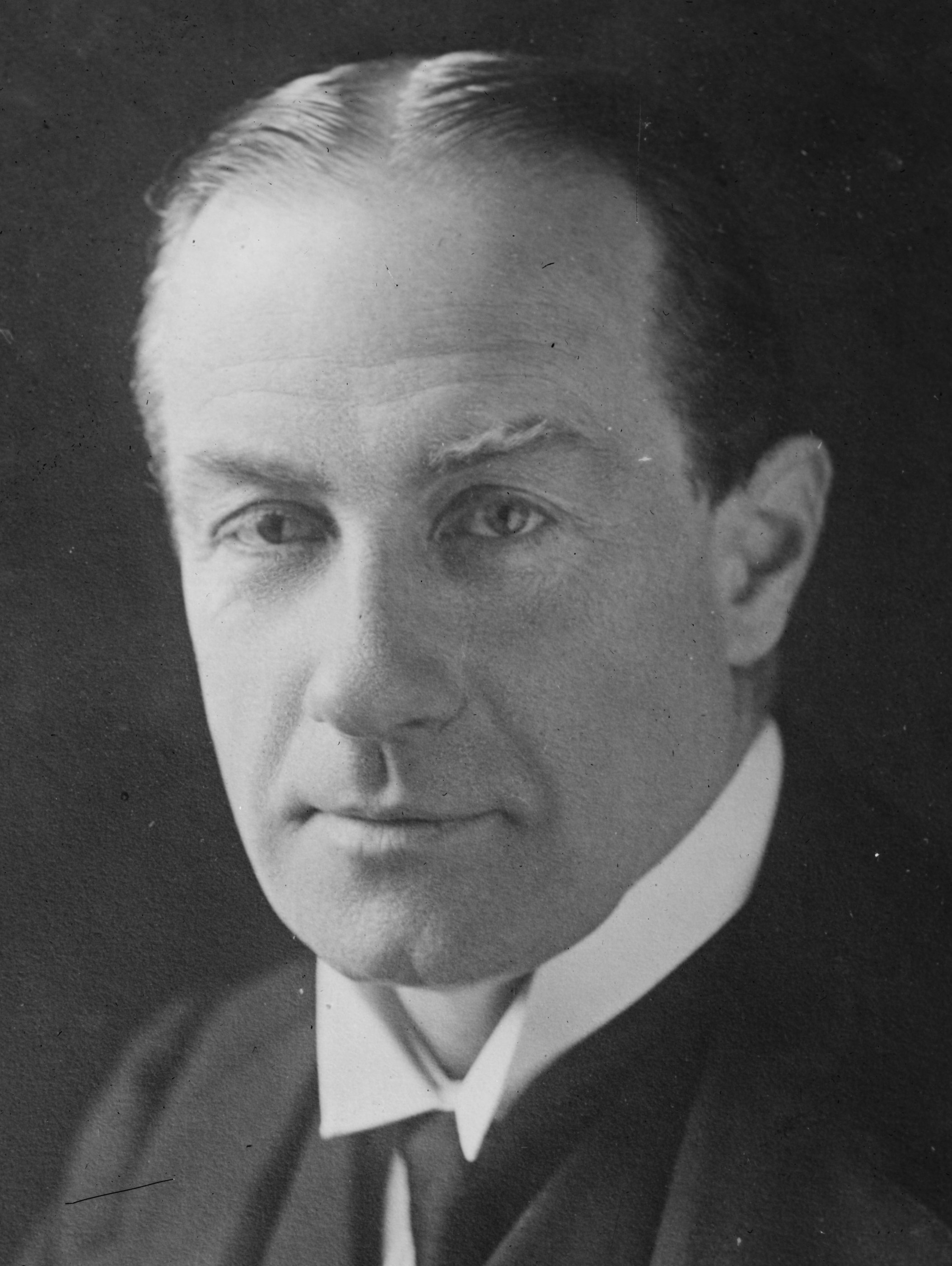
- Stanley Baldwin
- Date formed: 4 November 1924
- Date dissolved: 4 June 1929

People and organisations
- Monarch: George V
- Prime Minister: Stanley Baldwin
- Total no. of members: 114 appointments
- Member party: Conservative Party
- Status in legislature: Majority
- Opposition party: Labour Party
- Opposition leaders: Ramsay MacDonald in the House of Commons; Lord Haldane (1924–1928); Lord Parmoor (1928–1929) in the House of Lords

History
- Election: 1924 general election
- Outgoing election: 1929 general election
- Legislature terms: 34th UK Parliament
- Predecessor: First MacDonald ministry
- Successor: Second MacDonald ministry

Stanley Baldwin of the Conservative Party formed the second Baldwin ministry upon his reappointment as Prime Minister of the United Kingdom by King George V after the 1924 general election. His second ministry ended following the so-called "Flapper Election" of May 1929.

== Cabinet ==
=== November 1924 – June 1929 ===
- Stanley Baldwin – Prime Minister and Leader of the House of Commons
- George Cave, 1st Viscount Cave – Lord High Chancellor of Great Britain
- George Curzon, 1st Marquess Curzon of Kedleston – Leader of the House of Lords and Lord President of the Council
- James Gascoyne-Cecil, 4th Marquess of Salisbury – Lord Keeper of the Privy Seal
- Winston Churchill – Chancellor of the Exchequer
- Sir William Joynson-Hicks – Secretary of State for the Home Department
- Sir Austen Chamberlain – Secretary of State for Foreign Affairs and Deputy Leader of the House of Commons
- Leo Amery – Secretary of State for the Colonies
- Sir Laming Worthington-Evans, 1st Baronet – Secretary of State for War
- Frederick Edwin Smith, 1st Earl of Birkenhead – Secretary of State for India
- Sir Samuel Hoare – Secretary of State for Air
- Sir John Gilmour, 2nd Baronet – Secretary for Scotland
- William Clive Bridgeman – First Lord of the Admiralty
- Robert Cecil, 1st Viscount Cecil of Chelwood – Chancellor of the Duchy of Lancaster
- Sir Philip Cunliffe-Lister – President of the Board of Trade
- Edward Wood – Minister of Agriculture
- Lord Eustace Percy – President of the Board of Education
- William Peel, 2nd Viscount Peel – First Commissioner of Works
- Sir Arthur Steel-Maitland – Minister of Labour
- Neville Chamberlain – Minister of Health
- Sir Douglas Hogg – Attorney General for England and Wales

==== Changes ====
- April 1925 – On Curzon's death, Lord Balfour succeeded him as Lord President. Lord Salisbury became the new Leader of the House of Lords, remaining also Lord Privy Seal.
- June 1925 – The post of Secretary of State for Dominion Affairs was created, held by Leo Amery in tandem with Secretary of State for the Colonies.
- November 1925 – Walter Guinness succeeded E.F.L. Wood as Minister of Agriculture.
- July 1926 – The post of Secretary of Scotland was upgraded to Secretary of State for Scotland.
- October 1927 – Lord Cushendun succeeded Lord Cecil of Chelwood as Chancellor of the Duchy of Lancaster
- March 1928 – Lord Hailsham (former Sir D. Hogg) succeeded Lord Cave as Lord Chancellor. Hailsham's successor as Attorney-General was not in the Cabinet.
- October 1928 – Lord Peel succeeded Lord Birkenhead as Secretary of State for India. Lord Londonderry succeeded Peel as First Commissioner of Public Works

== List of ministers ==
Members of the Cabinet are in bold face.

Office	Name	Date
Prime Minister First Lord of the Treasury Leader of the House of Commons	**Stanley Baldwin**	4 November 1924 – 4 June 1929
Lord High Chancellor of Great Britain	**George Cave, 1st Viscount Cave**	6 November 1924
Lord High Chancellor of Great Britain	**Douglas Hogg, 1st Viscount Hailsham** (Note: Created Viscount Hailsham 4 July 1929.)	28 March 1928
Lord President of the Council	**George Curzon, 1st Marquess Curzon of Kedleston** (Note: Also Leader of the House of Lords.)	6 November 1924
Lord President of the Council	**Arthur Balfour, 1st Earl of Balfour**	27 April 1925
Lord Keeper of the Privy Seal	**James Gascoyne-Cecil, 4th Marquess of Salisbury** (Note: Also Leader of the House of Lords 27 April 1925 – 4 June 1929.)	6 November 1924
Chancellor of the Exchequer	**Winston Churchill**	6 November 1924
Parliamentary Secretary to the Treasury	Bolton Eyres-Monsell	7 November 1924
Financial Secretary to the Treasury	Walter Guinness	11 November 1924
Financial Secretary to the Treasury	Ronald McNeill	5 November 1925
Financial Secretary to the Treasury	Arthur Samuel	1 November 1927
Junior Lords of the Treasury	Sir George Hennessy	13 November 1924 – 10 December 1925
Junior Lords of the Treasury	Edward Stanley, Baron Stanley	13 November 1924 – 9 November 1927
Junior Lords of the Treasury	Frederick Thomson	13 November 1924 – 14 January 1928
Junior Lords of the Treasury	William Cope (Note: Created a Baronet 28 June 1928.)	13 November 1924 – 14 January 1928
Junior Lords of the Treasury	Francis Curzon	13 November 1924 – 15 January 1929
Junior Lords of the Treasury	David Margesson	28 August 1926 – 4 June 1929
Junior Lords of the Treasury	George Bowyer	28 December 1927 – 4 June 1929
Junior Lords of the Treasury	George Penny	13 January 1928 – 4 June 1929
Junior Lords of the Treasury	William Cavendish-Bentinck, Marquess of Titchfield	13 January 1928 – 4 June 1929
Junior Lords of the Treasury	Euan Wallace	1 January 1929 – 4 June 1929
Secretary of State for Foreign Affairs Deputy Leader of the House of Commons	**Austen Chamberlain** (Note: Knighted 1 December 1925.)	6 November 1924
Parliamentary Under-Secretary of State for Foreign Affairs	Ronald McNeill	11 November 1924
Parliamentary Under-Secretary of State for Foreign Affairs	Godfrey Locker-Lampson	7 December 1925
Secretary of State for the Home Department	**Sir William Joynson-Hicks**	6 November 1924
Under-Secretary of State for the Home Department	Godfrey Locker-Lampson	11 November 1924
Under-Secretary of State for the Home Department	Douglas Hacking	8 December 1925
Under-Secretary of State for the Home Department	Sir Vivian Henderson	9 November 1927
First Lord of the Admiralty	**William Bridgeman**	6 November 1924
Parliamentary and Financial Secretary to the Admiralty	J. C. C. Davidson	11 November 1924
Parliamentary and Financial Secretary to the Admiralty	Cuthbert Headlam	16 December 1926
Civil Lord of the Admiralty	James Stanhope, 7th Earl Stanhope	11 November 1924
Minister of Agriculture and Fisheries	**E. F. L. Wood**	6 November 1924
Minister of Agriculture and Fisheries	**Walter Guinness**	4 November 1925
Parliamentary Secretary to the Ministry of Agriculture and Fisheries	Charles Bathurst, 1st Baron Bledisloe	11 November 1924
Parliamentary Secretary to the Ministry of Agriculture and Fisheries	George Rous, 3rd Earl of Stradbroke	5 February 1928
Secretary of State for Air	**Sir Samuel Hoare**	6 November 1924
Under-Secretary of State for Air	Sir Philip Sassoon	11 November 1924
Secretary of State for the Colonies	**Leo Amery**	6 November 1924
Under-Secretary of State for the Colonies	William Ormsby-Gore	12 November 1924
Secretary of State for Dominion Affairs	**Leo Amery**	11 June 1925
Under-Secretary of State for Dominion Affairs	George Villiers, 6th Earl of Clarendon	5 August 1925
Under-Secretary of State for Dominion Affairs	Simon Fraser, 16th Lord Lovat	5 May 1927
Under-Secretary of State for Dominion Affairs	Ivor Windsor-Clive, 2nd Earl of Plymouth	1 January 1929
President of the Board of Education	**Lord Eustace Percy**	6 November 1924
Parliamentary Secretary to the Board of Education	Katharine Stewart-Murray, Duchess of Atholl	11 November 1924
Minister of Health	**Neville Chamberlain**	6 November 1924
Parliamentary Secretary to the Ministry of Health	Sir Kingsley Wood	11 November 1924
Secretary of State for India	**F. E. Smith, 1st Earl of Birkenhead**	6 November 1924
Secretary of State for India	**William Peel, 2nd Viscount Peel**	18 October 1928
Under-Secretary of State for India	Edward Turnour, 6th Earl Winterton	11 November 1924
Minister of Labour	**Sir Arthur Steel-Maitland**	6 November 1924
Parliamentary Secretary to the Ministry of Labour	Henry Betterton	11 November 1924
Chancellor of the Duchy of Lancaster	**Robert Cecil, 1st Viscount Cecil of Chelwood**	10 November 1924
Chancellor of the Duchy of Lancaster	**Ronald McNeill, 1st Baron Cushendun**	19 October 1927
Paymaster General	vacant	
Paymaster General	George Sutherland-Leveson-Gower, 5th Duke of Sutherland	28 January 1925
Paymaster General	Richard Onslow, 5th Earl of Onslow	2 December 1928
Minister of Pensions	George Tryon	11 November 1924
Parliamentary Secretary to the Ministry of Pensions	George Frederick Stanley	11 November 1924
Postmaster General	Sir William Mitchell-Thomson	11 November 1924
Assistant Postmaster General	Roundell Palmer, Viscount Wolmer	11 November 1924
Secretary for Scotland	**Sir John Gilmour, 2nd Baronet** (Note: Became Secretary of State for Scotland 15 July 1926.)	6 November 1924
Parliamentary Secretary to the Ministry of Health for Scotland	Walter Elliot (Note: Office abolished 26 July 1926.)	11 November 1924
Under-Secretary of State for Scotland	Walter Elliot	26 July 1926
President of the Board of Trade	**Sir Philip Lloyd-Greame** (Note: Changed surname to Cunliffe-Lister 17 November 1924.)	6 November 1924
Parliamentary Secretary to the Board of Trade	Sir Robert Burton-Chadwick	11 November 1924
Parliamentary Secretary to the Board of Trade	Herbert Williams	13 January 1928
Secretary for Overseas Trade	Arthur Samuel	11 November 1924
Secretary for Overseas Trade	Douglas Hacking	9 November 1927
Secretary for Mines	George Lane-Fox	11 November 1924
Secretary for Mines	Douglas King	13 January 1928
Minister of Transport	Wilfrid Ashley	11 November 1924
Parliamentary Secretary to the Ministry of Transport	John Moore-Brabazon	11 November 1924
Parliamentary Secretary to the Ministry of Transport	vacant	14 January 1927
Secretary of State for War	**Sir Laming Worthington-Evans, 1st Baronet**	6 November 1924
Under-Secretary of State for War	Richard Onslow, 5th Earl of Onslow	11 November 1924
Under-Secretary of State for War	George Sutherland-Leveson-Gower, 5th Duke of Sutherland	2 December 1928
Financial Secretary to the War Office	Douglas King	11 November 1924
Financial Secretary to the War Office	Duff Cooper	13 January 1928
First Commissioner of Works	**William Peel, 2nd Viscount Peel**	10 November 1924
First Commissioner of Works	**Charles Vane-Tempest-Stewart, 7th Marquess of Londonderry**	18 October 1928
Attorney General	**Sir Douglas Hogg**	6 November 1924
Attorney General	Sir Thomas Inskip	28 March 1928
Solicitor General	Sir Thomas Inskip	11 November 1924
Solicitor General	Sir Frank Merriman	28 March 1928
Lord Advocate	William Watson	11 November 1924
Lord Advocate	Alexander Munro MacRobert	23 April 1929
Solicitor General for Scotland	David Pinkerton Fleming	11 November 1924
Solicitor General for Scotland	Alexander Munro MacRobert	30 December 1925
Solicitor General for Scotland	Wilfrid Normand	23 April 1929
Treasurer of the Household	George Gibbs	13 November 1924
Treasurer of the Household	Sir George Hennessy	13 January 1928
Comptroller of the Household	Sir Harry Barnston	13 November 1924
Comptroller of the Household	Sir William Cope	13 January 1928
Vice-Chamberlain of the Household	Douglas Hacking	13 November 1924
Vice-Chamberlain of the Household	George Hennessy (Note: Created a Baronet 24 January 1927.)	10 December 1925
Vice-Chamberlain of the Household	Frederick Thomson (Note: Created a Baronet 28 March 1929.)	13 January 1928
Assistant Whips	David Margesson	13 November 1924 – 28 August 1926
Assistant Whips	George Bowyer	15 December 1924 – 28 December 1927
Assistant Whips	George Penny	22 February 1927 – 13 January 1928
Assistant Whips	William Cavendish-Bentinck, Marquess of Titchfield	9 November 1927 – 13 January 1928
Assistant Whips	Euan Wallace	13 January 1928 – 1 January 1929
Assistant Whips	Sir Victor Warrender, 8th Baronet	13 January 1928 – 4 June 1929
Captain of the Gentlemen-at-Arms	George Villiers, 6th Earl of Clarendon	1 December 1924
Captain of the Gentlemen-at-Arms	Ivor Windsor-Clive, 2nd Earl of Plymouth	26 June 1925
Captain of the Gentlemen-at-Arms	George Bingham, 5th Earl of Lucan	1 January 1929
Captain of the Yeomen of the Guard	William Grenfell, 1st Baron Desborough	1 December 1924
Lords in Waiting	Henry Gage, 6th Viscount Gage	1 December 1924 – 4 June 1929
Lords in Waiting	Arthur Somers-Cocks, 6th Baron Somers	1 December 1924 – 23 March 1926
Lords in Waiting	George Bingham, 5th Earl of Lucan	1 December 1924 – 1 January 1929
Lords in Waiting	David Ogilvy, 12th Earl of Airlie	1 April 1926 – 4 June 1929
Lords in Waiting	Arthur Chichester, 4th Baron Templemore	1 January 1929 – 4 June 1929

Notes

Preceded by First MacDonald ministry	Government of the United Kingdom; 1924–1929	Succeeded by Second MacDonald ministry
