= Caerphilly by-election =

Caerphilly by-election may refer to several by-elections in South Wales:

- 1921 Caerphilly by-election (UK Parliament), following the death of Alfred Onions; Labour hold
- 1939 Caerphilly by-election (UK Parliament), following the death of Morgan Jones; Labour hold
- 1968 Caerphilly by-election (UK Parliament), following the death of Ness Edwards; Labour hold
- 2025 Caerphilly by-election (Senedd), following the death of Hefin David; Plaid Cymru gain from Labour
