= First MacDonald ministry =

1924 UK government

- January–November 1924
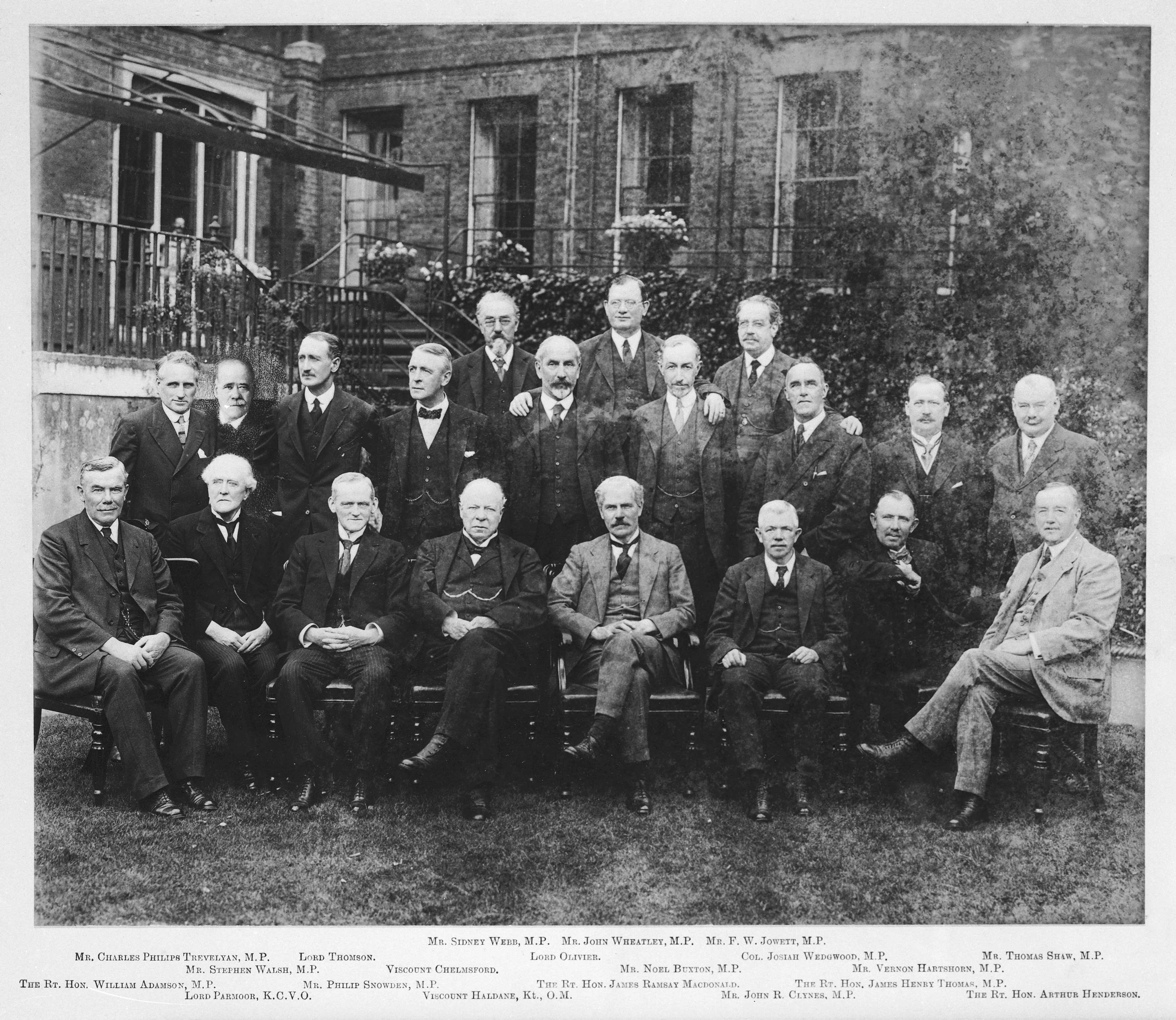
- Ramsay MacDonald and his cabinet
- Date formed: 22 January 1924
- Date dissolved: 4 November 1924

People and organisations
- Monarch: George V
- Prime Minister: Ramsay MacDonald
- Deputy Prime Minister: (Note: J. R. Clynes never acquired the title of Deputy Prime Minister of the United Kingdom. He did however serve as Deputy Leader of the Labour Party.)
- Total no. of members: 58 appointments
- Member party: Labour Party
- Status in legislature: Minority dependent on Liberal support
- Opposition party: Conservative Party
- Opposition leaders: Stanley Baldwin in the House of Commons; Lord Curzon of Kedleston in the House of Lords

History
- Election: 1923 general election
- Outgoing election: 1924 general election
- Legislature terms: 33rd UK Parliament lost a vote of confidence
- Predecessor: First Baldwin ministry
- Successor: Second Baldwin ministry

The first Labour government of the United Kingdom was formed by Ramsay MacDonald. A minority government, it lasted from January to November 1924, when they lost a vote of no confidence and were defeated by the Conservatives in the subsequent election.

After the Carlton Club meeting, in which the Conservatives voted to separate from the Lloyd George coalition, a general election was held in 1922, which resulted in a victory for the Conservatives and their Unionist allies, winning 344 seats and a convincing parliamentary majority of 74 seats — sufficient for a full parliamentary term.

However, several months after the election, the Conservative leader and Prime Minister Bonar Law resigned after being diagnosed with throat cancer, rendering him unable to speak. He was replaced by Stanley Baldwin, who reversed his predecessor's electoral pledge not to introduce protective tariffs. Baldwin sought a fresh mandate from the electorate in 1923.

The result failed to deliver support for Baldwin's protectionist stance; the Conservative Party remained the largest party in Parliament but lost their majority. As a result, Baldwin had little chance of remaining prime minister when the balance of power was held by the Liberal Party under H. H. Asquith, who had campaigned vigorously for free trade.

After losing the vote on the King's Speech, Baldwin resigned as Prime Minister and King George V subsequently invited Ramsay MacDonald to form a government. MacDonald accepted the King's invitation later that day, arriving with his Labour colleagues, to the amusement of many and dismay of others, in full court dress. Labour members were perturbed to hear stories of ministers wearing formal address and coached in court etiquette, not expecting their representatives to continue with traditions like these. Despite this, a number of individuals recognised the extent of Labour’s advance, as reflected by J.R. Clynes:

As we stood waiting for his Majesty, amid the gold & crimson of the Palace, I could not help marvelling at the strange turn of Fortune’s wheel, which had brought MacDonald the starveling clerk, Thomas the engine driver, Henderson the foundry labourer & Clynes the mill-hand to this pinnacle.

Labour’s rise to national government caused concern amongst a number of politicians and business people, with Winston Churchill arguing that "The enthronement of a Socialist government is a serious national misfortune" while the Lancashire and Yorkshire Bank chairman declared "Now is the time for unflinching courage."

David Lloyd George was less concerned about Labour in power, expressing his views in a letter to his daughter:

What changes are taking place. A socialist govt. actually in power. But don’t get uneasy about your investments or your antiques. Nothing will be removed or abstracted. They have come in like a lamb. Will they go out like a lion? Who knows? For the present ‘their tameness is shocking to me.’ They are all engaged in looking as respectable as lather and & blather will make them. They are out to soothe ruffled feathers. When you return you will find England quite unchanged. Ramsay is just a fussy Baldwin - & no more.

Although there were arguments against Labour forming a minority government, MacDonald believed that it was right for Labour to do so; partly because he believed it would give Labour experience of government and a chance to implement part of its programme. As he noted during a speech in Hull: “If we shirk our responsibilities now we should inflict upon ourselves the defeat that our enemies could not inflict upon us.”

Vivian Phillipps, the Liberal Party chief Whip, saw the potential of a minority Labour government supported by the Liberals in implementing positive measures, as he noted in a speech he made in February 1924:

For the first time for ten years the forces of progress in this country were able to command a majority in the House of Commons. The field of opportunity presented to them was so wide that if they could keep in step it was scarcely possible to set a limit to the extent to which they might transform conditions…With goodwill and consideration, not only in Parliament but in the constituencies, they could march together a long way before their paths need diverge… By the result of the recent Election it had fallen to a Labour Government to try to do many things which Liberals desired to see done. They as Liberals were ready to put the public need before any mere party interest and to help a Labour Government to do these things.

On the socialist side, Beatrice Webb saw Labour taking office as a gamble; albeit one that could be beneficial, as she noted in her diary:

For Labour to accept the responsibilities of government is a big risk: it may lead to immediate disaster. But its leaders will become educated in the realities of political life and in the work of administration; and even their future behaviour as HMO will be more responsible – more intelligently courteous and bold.

== MacDonald and the cabinet ==
MacDonald had become Labour's first proper leader in 1922. As well as being Prime Minister, he became his own Foreign Secretary, a dual role which he performed well enough, but which alienated the second man in the party, Arthur Henderson, who became Home Secretary. Philip Snowden, the evangelical ex-member of the Independent Labour Party (ILP) became a rigidly orthodox Chancellor of the Exchequer, while the next two prominent members of the party, J. H. Thomas and J. R. Clynes, became Colonial Secretary and Lord Privy Seal respectively. The Fabian Sidney Webb, who had, along with Henderson, been instrumental in conceiving Labour's 1918 programme 'Labour and the New Social Order' which had committed the party to nationalisation (Clause IV), was appointed President of the Board of Trade; another Fabian, Lord Olivier, became Secretary of State for India. A former chairman of the parliamentary party, Willie Adamson, became Scottish Secretary, while left-wingers Fred Jowett and John Wheatley became, respectively, First Commissioner of Works and Minister of Health.

The Cabinet was characterised by a moderate trade union feel, although it also contained a few Liberals. Only three members had previously been Cabinet Ministers: Lord Haldane had been a leading member of the prewar Liberal Government, while Arthur Henderson and J. R. Clynes had briefly been members of the wartime Coalition Government. Others had been under-secretaries.

== Social policy ==
Despite lacking a parliamentary majority, the First Labour Government was able to introduce a number of social measures which made life more tolerable for working people. The main achievement of the government was the Housing (Financial Provisions) Act 1924 (the Wheatley Housing Act), which MacDonald dubbed 'our most important legislative item'. This measure went some way towards rectifying the problem of the housing shortage, caused by the disruption of the building trade during the First World War and the inability of working-class tenants to rent decent, affordable housing. Wheatley was able to provide public housing to council tenants, as against the previous government's commitment to privatisation. This landmark act subsidised the construction of 521,700 rented homes at controlled rents by 1933, when the subsidy for encouraging local authority housing construction was abolished.

Various improvements were also made in benefits for pensioners and the unemployed. More generous provision for the unemployed was provided, with increases in both children's allowances and in unemployment benefits for both men and women. Unemployment benefit payments were increased from 15 shillings to 18 shillings a week for men, and from 12 shillings to 15 shillings for women, while the children's allowance was doubled to two shillings. The "gap" between periods of benefit under the unemployment insurance scheme was also abolished. Eligibility for unemployment benefits was extended, with the household means-test for the long-term unemployed removed, uncovenanted benefits (beyond those covered by insurance) made a statutory right, and the duration of unemployment benefits extended from 26 to 41 weeks. The waiting period for unemployment benefits was also halved; from 6 to 3 days of unemployment, and the government removed a previous rule under which workpeople were disqualified for unemployment benefits if thrown out of work due to a trade dispute in which they were not directly concerned. At the same time, however, a test introduced in 1921 under which "uncovenanted benefit" claimants had to prove they were "genuinely seeing work" was extended (as noted by one study) "to all claimants in an attempt to trade off greater strictness in the administration of benefit for higher rates of benefit and the abolition of the Means Test."

For pensioners, increases were made in both old-age pensions and the pensions of ex-servicemen and of their widows and children. Improvements were made in the condition of old-age pensioners by allowing small incomes from savings to be disregarded in calculating the pension due. As a result of this change, 60,000 elderly people, whose meagre savings had previously reduced their pension entitlement, received the full state pension. Eligibility for the state pension was also extended so that it covered 70% of the over-seventies, and 150,000 elderly people who had never received a pension before were now entitled to them. In addition, changes were made which allowed for pensions to be transferred to a surviving parent of a dependant who had a pension. An Old Age Pensions Act was also passed, which guaranteed a weekly pension of ten shillings (50p) to people over the age of seventy who earned under 15 shillings (75p) a week.

The government also endeavoured to extend educational opportunities. Local authorities were empowered, where they wished, to raise the school-leaving age to 15, the adult education grant was tripled, maintenance allowances for young people in secondary schools were increased, state scholarships (which had previously been in suspense) were restored, the proportion of free places in secondary schools was increased, approval was given to forty new secondary schools, a survey was carried out to provide for the replacement of as many of the more insanitary or obsolete schools as possible, and forty was set as the maximum class size in elementary school. Restrictions on education spending imposed by the previous government were removed, while local authorities were encouraged to increase the number of free secondary school places. In addition, an Education Act was passed which created an English secondary school system between the ages of 11–14 while a small expansion of central and secondary schools took place. The president of the Board of Education, Charles Trevelyan, also abolished a clause inserted by his predecessor that required authorities to consider whether in small schools "it is not practicable to give the head teacher direct charge of a class." In regards to elementary schools, new regulations were introduced that aimed to secure that classrooms, though limited in accommodation, should not be diminished in size. He minimum floor-space per child prescribed by the Board was increased from 10 to 12 square feet in respect of children over the age of 11, and from 9 to 10 square metres where younger children were concerned. Schemes were also approved for the erection or extension of secondary school buildings. Money was also provided towards the cost of scholarships for children from ages 14 to 15 in elementary schools.

The Agricultural Wages (Regulation) Act 1924 restored minimum wages for agricultural workers. County committees were established with the power to fix wages, together with a central wages board to supervise the county awards. The act helped bring about a substantial improvement over most of the country, with agricultural wages being quickly increased to 30 shillings a week (a higher level in certain counties) under the wage committees. In addition, a Conservative bill "to attenuate the powers of the Trade Boards" was dropped. In May 1924 recommendations aimed at preventing accidents in docks were approved by the Home Secretary, which included the institution of Safety First Organisations at the various ports and the adoption of a revised Code of Regulations. A new code was also issued under which (as noted by one authority) "added precautions will have to be taken to deal with the dangers of lead poisoning in electrical accumulator works". A Departmental Committee was also adopted to investigate the question of accidents in shipbuilding yards, while an Industrial Fatigue Research Board (under the request of the Home Office) conducted investigations into (as noted by one authority) "a comparison of the shift systems in the glass trade, the question of rest pauses in industry, and the effects of variety in repetitive work." Various improvements in workmen’s compensation were also carried out. An order made by the Secretary of State for the Home Department on 16 January 1924 extended the provisions of Section 8 of the Workmen’s Compensation act 1906 to cases of inflammation, ulceration and malignant disease of the skin and subcutaneous tissues as a result of exposure to X-rays or radio-active substances, and manganese poisoning. Miner's silicosis was also included within the provisions for workmen's compensation, under the Workmen's Compensation (Silicosis) Act 1924. In regards to a previous Workmen’s Compensation Act passed in 1923, a new memorandum was introduced for the benefit of workers explaining in the measure "in the simplest possible language" as noted by one authority. The scope of the Trade Boards in the distributive trades was also extended.

The London Traffic Act 1924, which provided for the regulation of London traffic, regulated privately owned public transport; setting timetables and safety standards. A law was introduced which modified the right of a landlord to obtain possession of a house for his own family's use, where unnecessary hardship would be caused to the tenant. The Protection from Eviction Act 1924 provided some degree of protection to tenants "in the face of landlords seeking vacant possession and rent rises." This legislation protected tenants from eviction by landlords who attempted to obtain "decontrolled" status for their properties to raise rents. In addition, government funds were allocated for the repair and modernisation of 60,000 government built houses.

Several measures aimed at supporting agriculture were carried out during Labour’s time in office. The interest on advances to co-operative credit societies formed under the Agricultural Credits Act 1923 passed by the previous Conservative government was reduced to 4%. A sum of £200,000 was placed at the disposal of the Minister of Agriculture for loans to co-operative enterprises, while special marketing officers were appointed "under the direction of a Marketing Commissioner to undertake a thorough survey of marketing problems." An additional sum of £500,000 was allocated from the Development Fund for agricultural research and education, while an additional £60,000 was provided for "unemployment relief schemes of land drainage and reclamation in the winter of 1924-25." Grants to heavy-horse breeding Societies that had previously been abolished on the recommendations of the Geddes Committee in 1922 were restored, and the government also provided for "the exemption from Income Tax of the profits of agricultural societies from shows or exhibitions if applied solely for the purposes of the society." A subsidy for sugar beet cultivation to support agriculture was also introduced.

The restrictions imposed by the previous government on spending by the Poplar Board of Guardians(which had pursued a policy of providing outdoor relief on a scale higher than that authorised by ministers) were removed, while the National Health Insurance (Cost of Medical Benefit) Bill revised the capitation fee paid to doctors. Restrictions introduced by the previous Coalition government on state grants to the principal public health grant earning services (including maternity and child welfare, tuberculosis, and venereal disease) were removed. This was followed by a circular issued to local authorities to this effect and enabling them "to carry out more effectively their public health powers under the law." Child welfare and maternity services were extended. In June 1924, a Circular was issued to all Maternity and Child Welfare Authorities, drawing attention (as noted by one study) "to the maternal mortality and disability associated with child-bearing and to various suggestions for reducing the risk involved, and urging each Authority to consider the matter with a view to taking such steps as might be necessary to provide an efficient Maternity Service in its area."

A Pensions (Increase) Act passed in August 1924 provided that "all local authorities must increase their pensions in accordance with this Act"; a proviso that was not obligatory under a previous Pensions (Increase) Act introduced in 1920. Entitlement to sickness allowances to war widows and orphans were extended, a national electrical policy and a national road policy was launched, and two additional treatment centres for those afflicted by venereal diseases were constructed. Various measures were also introduced to improve mine safety, as characterised by the application of new rules, attempts to enforce safety regulations, and the appointment of additional inspectors. Higher spending on education and health was carried out, while sickness grants (which had been abolished under a previous administration) were restored. The County Courts Act of 1924 provided (as noted by one study) “that no court fee shall be payable by the workman in workmen’s compensation proceedings.”

Various improvements were made to financial and other levels of support for veterans and their relatives. For war pensioners, new pensions were provided "in deserving cases at the rate of over three hundred a week." Ex-service patients who had been treated as "pauper lunatics" under former Governments were removed from being treated in that way. As a result of this change, they were now paid for out of public funds. The income for Need Pensions was increased from 20s a week to 25s a week in the case of widows or single persons, and from 30s to 35s a week (as noted by one study) "in the case of married persons who were the parents of those who gave their lives in the service of the nation." Regulations were issued under which a woman who had been deserted by her husband should be considered a widow, and that (as noted in one study) "in cases where the surviving children were in receipt of low wages or had large families, or were suffering from unemployment, their imputed contributions to the parent might be waived." A seven-year limit for the claim for pensions by parents or dependents of men who died as a result of war injuries was abolished and (as noted by one study) "in every case where the death certificate is to the effect that the man died of his war injuries, his parents and dependents are now entitled to pension." Changes were also carried out to the administration of the Ministry of Pensions which ensured that many men and women received pensions that they otherwise would not have received. Entitlement of children to pensions and treatment allowances was also extended. In hospitals and institutions where ex-Service men were treated, increased facilities were given for leave while dietary was altered and improved. For those suffering from tuberculosis, a provision was made in which overcoats and blankets would be provided for free.

Another achievement of the government was the settlement of dock and railway strikes that led to higher pay for the men involved. Also, in regards to miners, the government set up a court of inquiry which helped miners win improved terms. Other groups of workers also gained improved conditions as a result of government action.

== Economic policy ==
A number of economic reforms were also undertaken under Labour. Cuts in both direct and indirect taxation were also made which were hailed as representing a victory for working people, with the chancellor Philip Snowden describing the programme as representing "the greatest step ever taken towards the Radical idea of the free breakfast table." Although indirect taxation was reduced, a disposable surplus of nearly £26,500,000 was left to Snowden’s successor as chancellor, Winston Churchill, who paid tribute to Snowden as such:

The final & general result may justly be laid to the credit of the careful & scrupulous finance by which his (Mr. Snowden’s) administration of the treasury be distinguished.”

Duties on mineral waters were eliminated, while those on dried fruits were lowered and those on sugar, cocoa, coffee, and tea cut by half. A special tax on Corporation Profits was also abolished. Protective duties introduced during the Great War to safeguard the motor car and other industries were also ended, leading to concerns that the former would be ruined. Instead, as noted by one historian, "it continued to prosper, and the price of cars fell as the output increased." The Inhabited House Duty (a tax that was collected on the basis of rent) was also abolished. Duties were also reduced on films, watches, clocks, and musical instruments, and moves were made, as noted by one study; "to launch an inquiry into food prices and the cost of living." Labour also extended, as noted by one study, "the allowance for a housekeeper under the Income Tax law to widows and widowers without children."

Schemes for roads and bridges, land reclamation and drainage, and afforestation were developed and extended. Financial support was also provided to municipal works to reduce unemployment. Between 1 January and 30 June 1924, the government sanctioned local authorities’ loans to the extent of no less than £28 million, with more than £4 million of this sum geared toward relieving unemployment. Amongst the recipients of this money included housing, sewerage, bridges, roads, and street improvement. £20,000 was also allocated by the Board of Education to the cost of centres opened up by the London Joint Council of Juvenile Organisations for unemployed juveniles.

Although relief schemes funded by the chancellor Philip Snowden had little impact on reducing unemployment, the registered rate of unemployment fell from 11.7% in 1923 to 10.3% in 1924.

Reflecting its socialism, Labour approved a measure calling for the nationalisation of mines and materials which came up for Second Reading but was rejected, with both Conservatives and Liberals opposed. Regarding the latter, only five Liberals voted with Labour in the division on this measure.

== Foreign policy ==
Many historians have argued that the first Labour Government's most notable achievements were in foreign affairs, of which Ramsay MacDonald had devoted much time and effort, having taken the posts of both Prime Minister and Foreign Secretary. Germany had failed to maintain reparation payments in the years following the end of the Great War, and France, in response, occupied Germany's industrial heartland, the Ruhr. The Dawes Conference was subsequently held to find a solution to the crisis, and, in August 1924, it concluded that Germany had to achieve economic stability before paying out any reparations. Although France refused to adopt the Dawes Plan, MacDonald spent most of his time as Foreign Secretary trying to win over the French. MacDonald first held talks with both the Belgians and French at Chequers and then hosted an Inter-Allied conference in London in July 1924.

Through sharp negotiating skills and powers of persuasion, MacDonald was able to successfully make the Prime Minister of France Édouard Herriot agree to all of the proposals in the Dawes Plan, apart from an immediate withdrawal from the Ruhr. That August, fresh agreements on peace and reparations were signed in London between Germany and the Allies. MacDonald's success in helping to resolve international disagreements at this time was arguably one of the first Labour government's most significant accomplishments.

An existing cruiser building programme was cut back, while (against the opposition of Admiralty) work was halted on a project naval base in Singapore. The government also championed the Geneva Protocol, an undertaking by which (as noted by one observer) "League members would arbitrate all international disputes, disarm by agreement, and pledge mutual support in the event of unprovoked aggression anywhere in the world." In September, while addressing the League of Nations (the first British prime minister to do so), MacDonald put forward the case for international arbitration and disarmament; winning over delegates in the process. Before the Protocol was implemented however, it was vetoed by Austen Chamberlain, the foreign secretary of the successive Conservative government. As noted by one study, the new administration "was not prepared to commit Britain to the role of the "world’s policeman.’"

== Private member's bills ==
Several bills by individual Labour members were put forward during Labour’s time in office. A Government of Scotland bill was put forward that provided for Scottish Home Rule with its main proposal being the creation of a single-house assembly to deal with Scottish matters and with powers to raise taxes. Under the bill, the assembly would have 148 members and, until a general devolution scheme was introduced, Scottish representation in the House of Commons would continue. As noted by one observer, the bill’s sponsor George Buchanan (politician), ridiculed the idea

that English MPs were about to vote on a measure concerning the reunion of Presbyterian Scottish churches and that he, as a Glasgow Gorbals MP, was expected to vote on the London Traffic Bill.

However, the bill was talked out of the second reading by the Conservatives, and parliamentary time for the bill was refused by the government; represented by MacDonald himself in the House of Commons.

The Industrial and Provident Societies bill, which received a Second Reading and passed through Committee, was designed to prevent spurious organisations from using the word "co-operative" as a means of safeguarding the public from exploitation, while also benefiting members by increasing their holding from £200 to £400. Although the bill didn’t face much opposition, it could not (as noted by one study) "get through the final stages in the time devoted to Private Member’s Bills."

The Representation of the People bill, which was carried in a Second Reading by 288 to 702, included changes such as the elimination of a University fee for registration, an assimilation of the Parliamentary and Local Government franchises, and a lowering of the female voting age to 21. In Committee however, as one study noted, "it was soon made evident that if all the provisions of the Bill were adhered to, it would never get through," so in the end the bill was limited to the female voting age provision. Nevertheless, while the bill got through Committee it failed to progress further.

== Women's rights ==
During its time in office, Labour had pledged to pass measures of benefit to women such as equal guardianship rights, mother's pensions (cash benefits for widows) and equality in the franchise but had failed to do so. MacDonald denied time for a private member’s bill on the issue of equality in the franchise between men and women, an action for which he has been criticised, with one observer noting that ‘It would have been a relatively simple matter … to have adopted the bill and put it through its remaining stages,’ also arguing that ‘the advantage to Labour’s reputation would have been great, as would the gains at the ballot box."

A number of other bills relating to issues concerning women were put forward that also failed to get passed into law. One such bill sought to allow peeresses to sit and vote in the House of Lords in their own right, but as noted by one observer "the Debate was adjourned." The Summary Jurisdiction (Separation and Maintenance) Bill provided that a wife would no longer need to leave her husband before applying for a separation order, while the Legitimacy Bill sought (as one observer noted) "to render a child legitimate on the subsequent marriage of its parents." Although the latter two bills passed through Committee stage, they didn’t go further.

The Labour government’s record on promoting the rights of women was arguably a questionable one, although it did receive praise for appointing several women to various positions, such as a substitute delegate to the Fifth Assembly of the League of Nations and the only women members on committees of inquiry into British trade and the national debt. Credit was also given to the government for the establishment (shortly after it took office) of a committee to inquire into the work of policewomen taken on by local authorities. The committee’s inquiry, as noted by one observer,

formed a complete vindication of the use of women for police work; the Committee placing it on record that the efficiency of the police service had been improved by the employment of policewomen. This statement was widely quoted in the Press, and it is cheering to reflect than when a Unionist Government was returned to power at the close of this year, an early decision of the new Home Secretary, Sir William Hoyson-Wicks, increased the women police in the Metropolitan police force from 24 to 50.

Other positive changes affecting women included major changes to the criminal justice system concerning (as noted by one study) "the nomination and appointment of lay magistrates responsible for the vast majority of criminal justice in England and Wales." A reorganisation of advisory committees (bodies responsible in England and Wales for the nomination of Justices of the Peace) was carried out that not only increased opportunities for larger Labour representation on those committees, but also the appointment of more women and male workers to the magistracy. Also, the Duchy of Lancaster Josiah Wedgwood used his power to appoint magistrates in Lancashire, to press resolutely (a one study noted) "for the nomination of working men and, in particular, women to serve on various benches, such as Blackpool, Warrington, Bury, Accrington, Nelson and elsewhere." As noted by civil servants of his, Wedgwood believed in the appointment of women "in sympathy with Labour aspirations who are connected with educational and public work in the town."

Also, although the Labour government failed to introduce mother's pensions, it nevertheless played a key role in their design. In February 1924, a parliamentary motion was introduced and accepted (without division) that called for the establishment of such benefits, and the chancellor Philip Snowden promised to not only introduce mother's pensions but also reduce the old age pension age to 65. Neither proposal, however, was realised during Labour’s time in office, but both were introduced the following year under the successive Conservative government’s Widows', Orphans' and Old Age Contributory Benefits Act of 1925. The scheme provided under this Act was, according to one study, "based upon a plan which the Labour government had prepared and which they would have introduced that year if they had remained in office."

== Fall of the government ==
What eventually helped to bring down the first Labour government was red-baiting, the fear surrounding the alleged Communist threat. Conservatives were quick to point out any Communist or Soviet influence in Britain, one example being the Campbell Case. The Communist John Ross Campbell had been prosecuted by the government for publishing an article calling on troops not to fire on strikers. When Labour withdrew the prosecution, it was seen by many as a Communist influence on the leadership. H. H. Asquith, the Leader of the Liberal Party, called for the appointment of a committee of enquiry, as this would allow Labour time to survive the scandal, but MacDonald would not allow it. He said that if MPs voted in favour of the enquiry, then the government would resign. They consequently voted for the enquiry with a large majority, so MacDonald announced that the Labour government would resign after only nine months in office. Soon after this resignation came the emergence of the Zinoviev letter, which has become part of Labour Party mythology.

The Daily Mail published a letter apparently written by Grigory Zinoviev, the head of the Communist International (Comintern), which asked supporters to prepare for imminent revolution. It is now known that the Zinoviev letter was a fake, as documents released by the Public Record Office in 1998 revealed the letter to have been a forgery, but it scarcely helped Labour during their election campaign. J. H. Thomas is said to have exclaimed when seeing the first newspaper report about the alleged letter "We're sunk."

The Liberals were also becoming increasingly restive about continuing to support the government, while MacDonald's inability to delegate tasks to subordinates was also a factor in Labour's demise. He had taken the position of Foreign Secretary as well as Prime Minister, and by the end of the nine months it seemed as if MacDonald had wanted to give up power through fatigue. He once wrote in his diary that he worked from "7am to 1am, with occasional extras".

The main achievement of the government was that it showed itself to be "fit to govern". Although this might not have meant much in terms of concrete policy-making, it at least did not alarm voters who may have feared that the party would dismantle the country and promulgate "socialism"; although, in any case, its tenuous parliamentary position would have made radical moves near impossible. Hence, Labour policies such as nationalisation, the "capital levy" taxation and public works programmes to alleviate unemployment were either played down or ignored altogether. However, to act "respectably", as any other government would have, was a major component of the MacDonald electoral appeal and strategy. Indeed, some historians have seen, in this time, an electoral consensus that existed between MacDonald and his Conservative counterpart Baldwin, to maintain the stability of the electoral system and preclude any radicalism that might have alienated voters or exacerbated crises such as unemployment. By 1929, voters felt able to trust Labour and thus they were voted back in again.

According to one observer, the first Labour government "marked a stage in the process of converting a band of missionary zealots into a responsible political party, bidding for the difficult and compromising job of governing the country."

According to the Labour Party historian G. D. H. Cole, in summing up the record of the first Labour government,

What it could do and did achieve was to undo a good many of the administrative effects of the "Geddes Axe", to pass several valuable measures of social reform, and to make a somewhat faint-hearted attempt at coping with the unemployment problem by the institution of public works.

== Cabinet ==
=== January 1924 – November 1924 ===
- Ramsay MacDonald – Prime Minister, Foreign Secretary and Leader of the House of Commons
- Richard Burdon Haldane, 1st Viscount Haldane – Lord High Chancellor of Great Britain and joint Leader of the House of Lords
- Charles Cripps, 1st Baron Parmoor – Lord President of the Council and joint Leader of the House of Lords
- John Robert Clynes – Lord Keeper of the Privy Seal and Deputy Leader of the House of Commons
- Philip Snowden – Chancellor of the Exchequer
- Arthur Henderson – Secretary of State for the Home Department
- James Henry Thomas – Secretary of State for the Colonies
- Stephen Walsh – Secretary of State for War
- Sydney Olivier, 1st Baron Olivier – Secretary of State for India
- William Adamson – Secretary for Scotland
- Christopher Birdwood Thomson, 1st Baron Thomson – Secretary for Air
- Frederic Thesiger, 1st Viscount Chelmsford – First Lord of the Admiralty
- Josiah Wedgwood – Chancellor of the Duchy of Lancaster
- Sidney Webb – President of the Board of Trade
- Noel Buxton – Minister of Agriculture
- Charles Philips Trevelyan – President of the Board of Education
- Vernon Hartshorn – Postmaster-General
- Frederick William Jowett – First Commissioner of Works
- Thomas Shaw – Minister of Labour
- John Wheatley – Minister of Health

== List of ministers ==
Members of the Cabinet are in bold face.

Office	Name	Dates
Prime Minister First Lord of the Treasury Leader of the House of Commons	The Rt Hon **Ramsay MacDonald** MP	22 January 1924 – 3 November 1924

Office	Name	Dates
Prime Minister First Lord of the Treasury Leader of the House of Commons	**Ramsay MacDonald**	22 January 1924 – 3 November 1924
Lord Chancellor Leader of the House of Lords	**Richard Haldane, 1st Viscount Haldane**	22 January 1924
Lord President of the Council	**Charles Cripps, 1st Baron Parmoor**	22 January 1924
Lord Privy Seal Deputy Leader of the House of Commons	**J. R. Clynes**	22 January 1924
Chancellor of the Exchequer	**Philip Snowden**	22 January 1924
Parliamentary Secretary to the Treasury	Ben Spoor	23 January 1924
Financial Secretary to the Treasury	William Graham	23 January 1924
Junior Lords of the Treasury	Fred Hall	2 February 1924
Junior Lords of the Treasury	Tom Kennedy	2 February 1924
Junior Lords of the Treasury	John Robertson	2 February 1924
Junior Lords of the Treasury	George Henry Warne	24 February 1924
Secretary of State for Foreign Affairs	**Ramsay MacDonald**	22 January 1924
Parliamentary Under-Secretary of State for Foreign Affairs	Arthur Ponsonby	23 January 1924
Secretary of State for the Home Department	**Arthur Henderson**	22 January 1924
Under-Secretary of State for the Home Department	Rhys Davies	23 January 1924
First Lord of the Admiralty	**Frederic Thesiger, 1st Viscount Chelmsford**	22 January 1924
Parliamentary and Financial Secretary to the Admiralty	Charles Ammon	23 January 1924
Civil Lord of the Admiralty	Frank Hodges	24 January 1924
Secretary of State for War	**Stephen Walsh**	22 January 1924
Under-Secretary of State for War	Clement Attlee	23 January 1924
Financial Secretary to the War Office	Jack Lawson	23 January 1924
Secretary of State for Air	**Christopher Thomson, 1st Baron Thomson**	22 January 1924
Under-Secretary of State for Air	William Leach	23 January 1924
Secretary of State for the Colonies	**James Henry Thomas**	22 January 1924
Under-Secretary of State for the Colonies	Sydney Arnold, 1st Baron Arnold	23 January 1924
Secretary of State for India	**Sir Sydney Olivier** (Note: Created Baron Olivier on 9 February 1924.)	22 January 1924
Under-Secretary of State for India	Robert Richards	23 January 1924
Minister of Agriculture and Fisheries	**Noel Buxton**	22 January 1924
Parliamentary Secretary to the Ministry of Agriculture and Fisheries	Walter Robert Smith	23 January 1924
President of the Board of Education	**Charles Trevelyan**	22 January 1924
Parliamentary Secretary to the Board of Education	Morgan Jones	23 January 1924
Minister of Health	**John Wheatley**	22 January 1924
Parliamentary Secretary to the Ministry of Health	Arthur Greenwood	23 January 1924
Minister of Labour	**Tom Shaw**	22 January 1924
Parliamentary Secretary to the Ministry of Labour	Margaret Bondfield	23 January 1924
Chancellor of the Duchy of Lancaster	**Josiah Wedgwood**	22 January 1924
Postmaster General	**Vernon Hartshorn**	22 January 1924
Secretary for Scotland	**William Adamson**	22 January 1924
Parliamentary Secretary to the Ministry of Health for Scotland	James Stewart	23 January 1924
President of the Board of Trade	**Sidney Webb**	22 January 1924
Parliamentary Secretary to the Board of Trade	A. V. Alexander	23 January 1924
Secretary for Overseas Trade	William Lunn	23 January 1924
Secretary for Mines	Emanuel Shinwell	23 January 1924
First Commissioner of Works	**Frederick William Jowett**	22 January 1924
Paymaster General	Harry Gosling	6 May 1924
Parliamentary Secretary to the Office of the Paymaster-General	John William Muir	28 January 1924
Minister of Pensions	Frederick Roberts	23 January 1924
Parliamentary Secretary to the Ministry of Pensions	vacant	
Minister of Transport	Harry Gosling	24 January 1924
Attorney General	Sir Patrick Hastings	23 January 1924
Solicitor General	Sir Henry Slesser	23 January 1924
Lord Advocate	Hugh Macmillan	8 February 1924
Solicitor General for Scotland	John Charles Fenton	18 February 1924
Vice-Chamberlain of the Household	John Emanuel Davison	2 February 1924
Treasurer of the Household	Thomas Griffiths	2 February 1924
Comptroller of the Household	John Allen Parkinson	2 February 1924
Lords in Waiting	Herbrand Sackville, 9th Earl De La Warr	8 February 1924
Lords in Waiting	Kenneth Muir Mackenzie, 1st Baron Muir Mackenzie	8 February 1924

== Notes ==
Preceded by First Baldwin ministry	Government of the United Kingdom; 1924	Succeeded by Second Baldwin ministry
