= Caerphilly (UK Parliament constituency) =

UK Parliament constituency (1918–)

Coordinates: 51.579°N 3.218°W

- County constituency for the House of Commons
- Interactive map of boundaries from 2024
- Location of the constituency within Wales
- Preserved county: Gwent
- Electorate: 72,458 (March 2020)
- Major settlements: Caerphilly, Ystrad Mynach, Pontllanfraith, Hengoed, Nelson

Current constituency
- Created: 1918
- Member of Parliament: Chris Evans (Labour)
- Seats: One
- Created from: East Glamorganshire

Overlaps
- Senedd: Blaenau Gwent Caerffili Rhymni

Caerphilly (Welsh: Caerffili) is a constituency (Note: A borough constituency (for the purposes of election expenses and type of returning officer)) centred on the town of Caerphilly in South Wales, represented in the House of Commons of the UK Parliament since 2024 by Chris Evans of the Labour Party. (Note: As with all constituencies, the constituency elects one Member of Parliament (MP) by the first past the post system of election at least every five years.)

Since its creation, the constituency has always elected Labour MPs, although the predecessor constituency of East Glamorganshire, and prior to that Glamorganshire had elected Liberal MPs throughout the Victorian era.

== Boundaries ==
Map of boundaries 2010–2024

The Caerphilly constituency covers roughly the southern and eastern half of Caerphilly district, the part of the district historically located in Glamorgan. In the northwestern portion of the constituency are communities such as Hengoed and Ystrad Mynach, extending in a southeasterly direction through Caerphilly and Llanbradach to the rural outcrops bordering Cardiff.

2010–2024: The Caerphilly County Borough wards of Aber Valley, Aberbargoed and Bargoed, Bedwas and Trethomas, Gilfach, Hengoed, Llanbradach, Machen and Rudry, Morgan Jones, Nelson, Penyrheol, St Cattwg, St Martins, Van, and Ystrad Mynach.

2024–present: At the 2023 review of Westminster constituencies and under the June 2023 final recommendations of the Boundary Commission for Wales for the 2024 general election, the constituency retained its name but its boundaries altered. Four wards were taken from the abolished Islwyn constituency. The constituency was defined as being composed of the following wards of the County Borough of Caerphilly, as they existed on 1 December 2020:

- Aber Valley; Bedwas, Trethomas and Machen; Hengoed; Llanbradach; Maesycwmmer; Morgan Jones; Nelson; Pengam; Penyrheol; Pontllanfraith; St. Cattwg; St. James; St. Martins; Ynysddu; and Ystrad Mynach.

Following a local government boundary review which came into effect in May 2022, the constituency now comprises the following wards of the County Borough of Caerphilly from the 2024 general election:

- Aber Valley; Bedwas and Trethomas; Cefn Fforest and Pengam (part); Hengoed; Llanbradach; Machen and Rudry; Maesycwmmer; Morgan Jones; Nelson; Penyrheol; Pontllanfraith; St Cattwg; St Martins; Van; Ynysddu; and Ystrad Mynach.

== Members of Parliament ==
| Election | Member | Party |
|---|---|---|
| 1918 | Alfred Onions | Labour |
| 1921 by-election | Morgan Jones | Labour |
| 1939 by-election | Ness Edwards | Labour |
| 1968 by-election | Fred Evans | Labour |
| 1979 | Ednyfed Hudson Davies | Labour |
| 1981 | Ednyfed Hudson Davies | SDP |
| 1983 | Ron Davies | Labour |
| 2001 | Wayne David | Labour |
| 2024 | Chris Evans | Labour |

== Elections ==
=== Elections in the 1910s ===
General election 1918: Caerphilly
| Party | Candidate | Votes | % | ±% |
|---|---|---|---|---|
| Labour | Alfred Onions | 11,496 | 54.8 | N/A |
| Liberal | William Rees Edmunds | 9,482 | 45.2 | N/A |
| Majority | | 2,014 | 9.6 | N/A |
| Turnout | | 20,978 | 64.0 | N/A |
| Registered electors | | 32,790 | | |
| Labour win (new seat) | | | | |

=== Elections in the 1920s ===
1921 Caerphilly by-election
| Party | Candidate | Votes | % | ±% |
|---|---|---|---|---|
| Labour | Morgan Jones | 13,699 | 54.2 | −0.6 |
| Liberal | William Rees Edmunds | 8,958 | 35.5 | −9.7 |
| Communist | Bob Stewart | 2,592 | 10.3 | N/A |
| Majority | | 4,741 | 18.7 | +9.1 |
| Turnout | | 25,249 | 73.2 | +9.2 |
| Registered electors | | 34,511 | | |
| Labour hold | | Swing | +4.5 | |

General election 1922: Caerphilly
| Party | Candidate | Votes | % | ±% |
|---|---|---|---|---|
| Labour | Morgan Jones | 16,082 | 57.2 | +2.4 |
| Unionist | Alan McLean | 12,057 | 42.8 | N/A |
| Majority | | 4,025 | 14.4 | +4.8 |
| Turnout | | 28,139 | 78.6 | +5.4 |
| Registered electors | | 35,795 | | |
| Labour hold | | Swing | | |

General election 1923: Caerphilly
| Party | Candidate | Votes | % | ±% |
|---|---|---|---|---|
| Labour | Morgan Jones | 16,535 | 58.7 | +1.5 |
| Unionist | Gwilym Rowlands | 6,493 | 23.0 | −19.8 |
| Liberal | Samuel Roberts Jenkins | 5,152 | 18.3 | N/A |
| Majority | | 10,042 | 35.7 | +21.3 |
| Turnout | | 28,180 | 77.0 | −1.6 |
| Registered electors | | 36,592 | | |
| Labour hold | | Swing | +10.6 | |

General election 1924: Caerphilly
| Party | Candidate | Votes | % | ±% |
|---|---|---|---|---|
| Labour | Morgan Jones | 17,723 | 59.0 | +0.3 |
| Unionist | Gwilym Rowlands | 12,293 | 41.0 | +18.0 |
| Majority | | 5,430 | 18.0 | −17.7 |
| Turnout | | 29,996 | 79.3 | +2.3 |
| Registered electors | | 37,868 | | |
| Labour hold | | Swing | -8.8 | |

General election 1929: Caerphilly
| Party | Candidate | Votes | % | ±% |
|---|---|---|---|---|
| Labour | Morgan Jones | 21,248 | 57.9 | −1.1 |
| Liberal | Alice Grace Roberts | 8,190 | 22.4 | N/A |
| Unionist | Owen Temple-Morris | 6,357 | 17.4 | −23.6 |
| Communist | J R Wilson | 829 | 2.3 | N/A |
| Majority | | 13,058 | 35.5 | +17.5 |
| Turnout | | 36,624 | 81.1 | +1.8 |
| Registered electors | | 45,173 | | |
| Labour hold | | Swing | | |

=== Elections in the 1930s ===
General election 1931: Caerphilly
| Party | Candidate | Votes | % | ±% |
|---|---|---|---|---|
| Labour | Morgan Jones | 23,061 | 67.6 | +9.7 |
| Conservative | Catherine Bowen-Davies | 11,044 | 32.4 | +15.0 |
| Majority | | 12,017 | 35.2 | −0.3 |
| Turnout | | 34,105 | 76.6 | −4.5 |
| Registered electors | | 44,509 | | |
| Labour hold | | Swing | | |

General election 1935: Caerphilly
| Party | Candidate | Votes | % | ±% |
|---|---|---|---|---|
| Labour | Morgan Jones | 24,846 | 76.2 | +8.6 |
| Conservative | Nesta Jessie Stoneham | 7,738 | 23.8 | −8.6 |
| Majority | | 17,108 | 52.4 | +17.2 |
| Turnout | | 32,584 | 72.3 | −4.3 |
| Registered electors | | 45,057 | | |
| Labour hold | | Swing | | |

1939 Caerphilly by-election
| Party | Candidate | Votes | % | ±% |
|---|---|---|---|---|
| Labour | Ness Edwards | 19,847 | 68.0 | −8.2 |
| Conservative | Ronald Bell | 9,349 | 32.0 | +8.2 |
| Majority | | 10,498 | 36.0 | −16.4 |
| Turnout | | 29,196 | 68.4 | −3.9 |
| Registered electors | | 42,678 | | |
| Labour hold | | Swing | | |

=== Elections in the 1940s ===
General election 1945: Caerphilly
| Party | Candidate | Votes | % | ±% |
|---|---|---|---|---|
| Labour | Ness Edwards | 29,158 | 80.2 | +4.0 |
| Conservative | John Frederick Manuel de Courcy | 7,189 | 19.8 | −4.0 |
| Majority | | 21,969 | 60.4 | +8.0 |
| Turnout | | 36,347 | 77.2 | +4.9 |
| Registered electors | | 47,078 | | |
| Labour hold | | Swing | | |

=== Elections in the 1950s ===
General election 1950: Caerphilly
| Party | Candidate | Votes | % | ±% |
|---|---|---|---|---|
| Labour | Ness Edwards | 30,270 | 77.5 | −2.7 |
| Conservative | K J Lloyd | 8,771 | 22.5 | +2.7 |
| Majority | | 21,499 | 55.0 | −5.4 |
| Turnout | | 39,041 | 84.3 | +7.1 |
| Registered electors | | 46,321 | | |
| Labour hold | | Swing | | |

General election 1951: Caerphilly
| Party | Candidate | Votes | % | ±% |
|---|---|---|---|---|
| Labour | Ness Edwards | 30,523 | 77.1 | −0.4 |
| Conservative | Kenneth Gordon Knee | 9,041 | 22.9 | +0.4 |
| Majority | | 21,482 | 54.2 | −0.8 |
| Turnout | | 39,564 | 84.4 | +0.1 |
| Registered electors | | 46,893 | | |
| Labour hold | | Swing | | |

General election 1955: Caerphilly
| Party | Candidate | Votes | % | ±% |
|---|---|---|---|---|
| Labour | Ness Edwards | 27,852 | 75.2 | −1.9 |
| Conservative | John H. Davies | 9,180 | 24.8 | +1.9 |
| Majority | | 18,672 | 50.4 | −3.8 |
| Turnout | | 37,032 | 78.6 | −5.8 |
| Registered electors | | 47,131 | | |
| Labour hold | | Swing | | |

General election 1959: Caerphilly
| Party | Candidate | Votes | % | ±% |
|---|---|---|---|---|
| Labour | Ness Edwards | 28,154 | 72.7 | −2.5 |
| Conservative | W Russell Lewis | 7,181 | 18.5 | −6.3 |
| Plaid Cymru | John D. A. Howell | 3,420 | 8.8 | N/A |
| Majority | | 20,973 | 54.2 | +3.8 |
| Turnout | | 38,735 | 83.0 | +4.4 |
| Registered electors | | 46,671 | | |
| Labour hold | | Swing | | |

=== Elections in the 1960s ===
General election 1964: Caerphilly
| Party | Candidate | Votes | % | ±% |
|---|---|---|---|---|
| Labour | Ness Edwards | 26,001 | 72.1 | −0.6 |
| Conservative | Ronald J Maddocks | 6,086 | 16.9 | −1.6 |
| Plaid Cymru | Phil Williams | 3,956 | 11.0 | +2.2 |
| Majority | | 19,915 | 55.2 | +1.0 |
| Turnout | | 36,043 | 78.4 | −4.6 |
| Registered electors | | 45,969 | | |
| Labour hold | | Swing | | |

General election 1966: Caerphilly
| Party | Candidate | Votes | % | ±% |
|---|---|---|---|---|
| Labour | Ness Edwards | 26,330 | 74.3 | +2.2 |
| Conservative | Ronald J. Maddocks | 5,182 | 14.6 | −2.3 |
| Plaid Cymru | John D. A. Howell | 3,949 | 11.1 | +0.1 |
| Majority | | 21,148 | 59.7 | +4.5 |
| Turnout | | 35,461 | 76.8 | −1.6 |
| Registered electors | | 46,180 | | |
| Labour hold | | Swing | | |

1968 Caerphilly by-election
| Party | Candidate | Votes | % | ±% |
|---|---|---|---|---|
| Labour | Alfred Evans | 16,148 | 45.7 | −28.6 |
| Plaid Cymru | Phil Williams | 14,274 | 40.4 | +29.3 |
| Conservative | Robert Williams | 3,687 | 10.4 | −4.2 |
| Liberal | Peter Sadler | 1,257 | 3.5 | N/A |
| Majority | | 1,874 | 5.3 | −54.4 |
| Turnout | | 35,366 | 75.9 | −0.9 |
| Registered electors | | 46,578 | | |
| Labour hold | | Swing | | |

=== Elections in the 1970s ===
General election 1970: Caerphilly
| Party | Candidate | Votes | % | ±% |
|---|---|---|---|---|
| Labour | Alfred Evans | 24,972 | 61.8 | −12.5 |
| Plaid Cymru | Phil Williams | 11,505 | 28.5 | +17.4 |
| Conservative | Peter Price | 3,917 | 9.7 | −4.9 |
| Majority | | 13,467 | 33.3 | −26.4 |
| Turnout | | 40,394 | 78.1 | +1.3 |
| Registered electors | | 51,741 | | |
| Labour hold | | Swing | | |

General election February 1974: Caerphilly
| Party | Candidate | Votes | % | ±% |
|---|---|---|---|---|
| Labour | Alfred Evans | 24,838 | 57.2 | −4.6 |
| Plaid Cymru | Phil Williams | 11,956 | 27.5 | −1.0 |
| Conservative | Roger Everest | 5,912 | 13.6 | +3.9 |
| Independent | D H Bevan | 711 | 1.6 | N/A |
| Majority | | 12,882 | 29.7 | −3.6 |
| Turnout | | 40,394 | 77.5 | −0.6 |
| Registered electors | | 56,013 | | |
| Labour hold | | Swing | | |

General election October 1974: Caerphilly
| Party | Candidate | Votes | % | ±% |
|---|---|---|---|---|
| Labour | Alfred Evans | 24,161 | 56.6 | −0.6 |
| Plaid Cymru | Phil Williams | 10,452 | 24.5 | −3.0 |
| Conservative | Den Dover | 4,897 | 11.5 | −2.1 |
| Liberal | N H Lewis | 3,184 | 7.4 | N/A |
| Majority | | 13,709 | 32.1 | +2.4 |
| Turnout | | 42,694 | 75.6 | −1.9 |
| Registered electors | | 56,462 | | |
| Labour hold | | Swing | | |

General election 1979: Caerphilly
| Party | Candidate | Votes | % | ±% |
|---|---|---|---|---|
| Labour | Ednyfed Hudson Davies | 27,280 | 58.8 | +2.2 |
| Conservative | John Ranelagh | 8,783 | 18.9 | +7.4 |
| Plaid Cymru | Phil Williams | 6,931 | 15.0 | −9.5 |
| Liberal | N Jones | 3,430 | 7.3 | −0.1 |
| Majority | | 18,497 | 39.9 | +7.8 |
| Turnout | | 46,424 | 78.8 | +3.2 |
| Registered electors | | 58,908 | | |
| Labour hold | | Swing | | |

=== Elections in the 1980s ===
General election 1983: Caerphilly
| Party | Candidate | Votes | % | ±% |
|---|---|---|---|---|
| Labour | Ron Davies | 21,570 | 45.6 | −13.2 |
| Liberal | Anthony Lambert | 10,017 | 21.2 | +13.9 |
| Conservative | Charles Welby | 9,295 | 19.6 | +0.7 |
| Plaid Cymru | Lindsay Whittle | 6,414 | 13.6 | −1.4 |
| Majority | | 11,553 | 24.4 | −15.5 |
| Turnout | | 47,296 | 74.5 | −4.3 |
| Registered electors | | 63,479 | | |
| Labour hold | | Swing | | |

General election 1987: Caerphilly
| Party | Candidate | Votes | % | ±% |
|---|---|---|---|---|
| Labour | Ron Davies | 28,698 | 58.4 | +12.8 |
| Conservative | Michael Powell | 9,531 | 19.4 | −0.2 |
| Liberal | Michael Butlin | 6,923 | 14.1 | −7.1 |
| Plaid Cymru | Lindsay Whittle | 3,955 | 8.1 | −5.5 |
| Majority | | 19,167 | 39.0 | +14.6 |
| Turnout | | 49,107 | 76.6 | +2.1 |
| Registered electors | | 64,154 | | |
| Labour hold | | Swing | | |

=== Elections in the 1990s ===
General election 1992: Caerphilly
| Party | Candidate | Votes | % | ±% |
|---|---|---|---|---|
| Labour | Ron Davies | 31,713 | 63.7 | +5.3 |
| Conservative | Howard L. Philpott | 9,041 | 18.1 | −1.3 |
| Plaid Cymru | Lindsay Whittle | 4,821 | 9.7 | +1.6 |
| Liberal Democrats | Stan W. Wilson | 4,247 | 8.5 | −5.6 |
| Majority | | 22,672 | 45.6 | +6.6 |
| Turnout | | 49,822 | 77.2 | +0.6 |
| Registered electors | | 64,529 | | |
| Labour hold | | Swing | +3.2 | |

General election 1997: Caerphilly
| Party | Candidate | Votes | % | ±% |
|---|---|---|---|---|
| Labour | Ron Davies | 30,697 | 67.3 | +3.6 |
| Conservative | Rhodri Harris | 4,858 | 10.7 | −7.4 |
| Plaid Cymru | Lindsay Whittle | 4,383 | 9.7 | ±0.0 |
| Liberal Democrats | Tony D. Ferguson | 3,724 | 8.2 | −0.3 |
| Referendum | Mark E. Morgan | 1,337 | 3.0 | N/A |
| ProLife Alliance | Catherine Williams | 270 | 0.6 | N/A |
| Majority | | 25,839 | 56.6 | +11.0 |
| Turnout | | 45,269 | 70.1 | −7.1 |
| Registered electors | | 64,621 | | |
| Labour hold | | Swing | +5.5 | |

=== Elections in the 2000s ===
General election 2001: Caerphilly
| Party | Candidate | Votes | % | ±% |
|---|---|---|---|---|
| Labour | Wayne David | 22,597 | 58.2 | −9.1 |
| Plaid Cymru | Lindsay Whittle | 8,172 | 21.0 | +11.3 |
| Conservative | David Simmonds | 4,415 | 11.4 | +0.7 |
| Liberal Democrats | Rob Roffe | 3,649 | 9.4 | +1.2 |
| Majority | | 14,425 | 37.2 | −18.4 |
| Turnout | | 38,833 | 57.7 | −12.4 |
| Registered electors | | 67,300 | | |
| Labour hold | | Swing | -10.5 | |

General election 2005: Caerphilly
| Party | Candidate | Votes | % | ±% |
|---|---|---|---|---|
| Labour | Wayne David | 22,190 | 56.6 | −1.6 |
| Plaid Cymru | Lindsay Whittle | 6,831 | 17.4 | −3.6 |
| Conservative | Stephen Watson | 5,711 | 14.6 | +3.2 |
| Liberal Democrats | Ashgar Ali | 3,861 | 9.8 | +0.4 |
| Forward Wales | Rachel Ball | 636 | 1.6 | N/A |
| Majority | | 15,359 | 39.2 | +2.0 |
| Turnout | | 39,229 | 58.6 | +0.9 |
| Registered electors | | 66,162 | | |
| Labour hold | | Swing | +1.0 | |

=== Elections in the 2010s ===
General election 2010: Caerphilly
| Party | Candidate | Votes | % | ±% |
|---|---|---|---|---|
| Labour | Wayne David | 17,377 | 44.9 | −10.5 |
| Conservative | Maria Caulfield | 6,622 | 17.1 | +2.4 |
| Plaid Cymru | Lindsay Whittle | 6,460 | 16.7 | −1.4 |
| Liberal Democrats | Kay David | 5,688 | 14.7 | +4.7 |
| BNP | Laurence Reid | 1,635 | 4.2 | N/A |
| UKIP | Tony Jenkins | 910 | 2.4 | N/A |
| Majority | | 10,755 | 27.8 | −11.4 |
| Turnout | | 38,692 | 62.3 | +3.7 |
| Registered electors | | 62,122 | | |
| Labour hold | | Swing | −6.5 | |

General election 2015: Caerphilly
| Party | Candidate | Votes | % | ±% |
|---|---|---|---|---|
| Labour | Wayne David | 17,864 | 44.3 | −0.6 |
| UKIP | Sam Gould | 7,791 | 19.3 | +16.9 |
| Conservative | Leo Docherty | 6,683 | 16.6 | −0.5 |
| Plaid Cymru | Beci Newton | 5,895 | 14.6 | −2.1 |
| Green | Katy Beddoe | 937 | 2.3 | N/A |
| Liberal Democrats | Aladdin Ayesh | 935 | 2.3 | −12.4 |
| TUSC | Rachel Ball | 178 | 0.4 | N/A |
| Rejected ballots | | 81 | | |
| Majority | | 10,073 | 25.0 | −2.8 |
| Turnout | | 40,283 | 63.3 | +1.0 |
| Registered electors | | 63,603 | | |
| Labour hold | | Swing | −8.7 | |

Of the 81 rejected ballots:

- 59 were either unmarked or it was uncertain who the vote was for.
- 22 voted for more than one candidate.

General election 2017: Caerphilly
| Party | Candidate | Votes | % | ±% |
|---|---|---|---|---|
| Labour | Wayne David | 22,491 | 54.5 | +10.2 |
| Conservative | Jane Pratt | 10,413 | 25.2 | +8.6 |
| Plaid Cymru | Lindsay Whittle | 5,962 | 14.4 | −0.2 |
| UKIP | Liz Wilks | 1,259 | 3.0 | −16.3 |
| Liberal Democrats | Kay David | 725 | 1.8 | −0.5 |
| Green | Andrew Creak | 447 | 1.1 | −1.2 |
| Majority | | 12,078 | 29.3 | +4.3 |
| Turnout | | 41,297 | 64.1 | +0.8 |
| Registered electors | | 64,381 | | |
| Labour hold | | Swing | +0.7 | |

General election 2019: Caerphilly
| Party | Candidate | Votes | % | ±% |
|---|---|---|---|---|
| Labour | Wayne David | 18,018 | 44.9 | −9.6 |
| Conservative | Jane Pratt | 11,185 | 27.9 | +2.7 |
| Plaid Cymru | Lindsay Whittle | 6,424 | 16.0 | +1.6 |
| Brexit Party | Nathan Gill | 4,490 | 11.2 | N/A |
| Rejected ballots | | 160 | | |
| Majority | | 6,833 | 17.0 | −12.3 |
| Turnout | | 40,117 | 65.3 | −2.8 |
| Registered electors | | 63,166 | | |
| Labour hold | | Swing | −6.1 | |

Of the 160 rejected ballots:

- 132 were either unmarked or it was uncertain who the vote was for.
- 28 voted for more than one candidate.

2019 notional result (Note: Estimate of the 2019 general election result as if the revised boundaries recommended under the 2023 boundary review were in place)
| Party | Vote | % |
|---|---|---|
| Labour | 19,763 | 43.9 |
| Conservative | 12,882 | 28.6 |
| Plaid Cymru | 6,630 | 14.7 |
| Brexit Party | 5,287 | 11.7 |
| Liberal Democrats | 323 | 0.7 |
| Green Party | 164 | 0.4 |
| Majority | 6,901 | 15.3 |
| Turnout | 45,069 | 62.2 |
| Electorate | 72,458 | |

=== Elections in the 2020s ===
General election 2024: Caerphilly
| Party | Candidate | Votes | % | ±% |
|---|---|---|---|---|
| Labour Co-op | Chris Evans | 14,538 | 38.0 | −5.9 |
| Plaid Cymru | Lindsay Whittle | 8,119 | 21.2 | +6.5 |
| Reform | Joshua Seungkyun Kim | 7,754 | 20.3 | +8.6 |
| Conservative | Brandon Gorman | 4,385 | 11.5 | −17.1 |
| Liberal Democrats | Steve Aicheler | 1,788 | 4.7 | +4.0 |
| Green | Mark Thomas | 1,650 | 4.3 | +3.9 |
| Majority | | 6,419 | 16.8 | |
| Turnout | | 38,234 | 52.7 | −9.6 |
| Registered electors | | 72,643 | | |
| Labour hold | | Swing | −6.2 | |

Of the 156 rejected ballots:

- 127 were either unmarked or it was uncertain who the vote was for.
- 28 voted for more than one candidate.
- 1 had writing or a mark by which the voter could be identified.

== See also ==
- Caerphilly (Senedd constituency)
- List of UK Parliament constituencies in Gwent
- List of UK Parliament constituencies in Wales
