= Alfred Onions =

British politician (1858–1921)

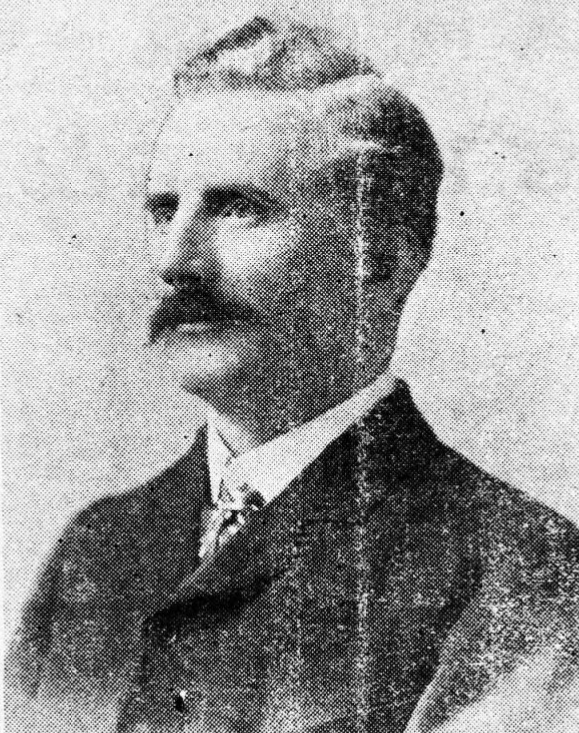
- Onions in 1914

Member of Parliament for Caerphilly
- In office 1918–1921
- Preceded by: (new constituency)
- Succeeded by: Morgan Jones

Treasurer of the South Wales Miners' Federation
- In office 1898–1921
- Preceded by: New position
- Succeeded by: Oliver Harris

Agent for the Tredegar Valley District of the South Wales Miners' Federation
- In office 1898–1919
- Preceded by: New position
- Succeeded by: George Davies

Personal details
- Born: 30 October 1858 St George's, Shropshire, England
- Died: 5 July 1921 (aged 62) Tredegar, Wales
- Party: Labour

Alfred Onions (30 October 1858 – 5 July 1921) was a Welsh trade unionist, a Member of Parliament for the Labour Party, a Wesleyan Methodist and a very longstanding local preacher. He was born in St George's, Shropshire, the son of a collier.

He died in Tredegar following a sudden and unexpected serious breakdown in health.

== Early life ==
Onions began work at the age of ten-and-a-half, when he followed his father into coal mining. At the age of 20, he attended the local North Staffordshire Adult Education Society. Soon afterwards, in 1883, he left Shropshire to obtain work in the Black Vein Colliery, in Risca, Monmouthshire.

== Trade unionism and politics ==
Two years after Onions started work in the Black Vein Colliery, it closed down for a while. Consequently, he obtained work in the collieries in the Rhondda and then Abercarn. Subsequently, he rose through the ranks of the local trade union movement. Initially in Abercarn colliery, he was selected as checkweighman. Then, in 1888 he was selected as the secretary of the Monmouth District of the Monmouthshire and South Wales District Miners' Association, which was based in Crumlin, in which capacity he served for ten years. While he was the secretary, in 1891 his peers selected him to represent the miners of South Wales at the Paris Congress of the Miners' International Federation.

From 1893 to 1898 Onions served as the Miners' Agent for the Rhymney Valley. In 1898 the Monmouthshire and South Wales District Miners' Association became part of the South Wales Miners' Federation ('The Fed'), for which he was one of its founding members and became its first treasurer. From 1898 to 1918 he served as the Miners' Agent for the Tredegar Valley (now known as the Sirhowy Valley). Also he represented South Wales several times on the committee of the Miners' Federation of Great Britain. In 1910 he travelled with Robert Smillie, his Scottish counterpart, to the German coalfields in the Ruhr 'to investigate the conditions of the working-classes ... under the tariff system.' Their report was subsequently published later that year.

Onions was active in the Liberal-Labour movement, serving on local school boards, then on Monmouthshire County Council, on which he became its chair. He was also the first chair of Risca Urban District Council.

He was elected as member of parliament for Caerphilly at the 1918 general election and retired in 1921. He was succeeded by Morgan Jones.

Parliament of the United Kingdom
Preceded by (new constituency)	Member of Parliament for Caerphilly; 1918–1921	Succeeded by Morgan Jones
Trade union offices
Preceded by New position	Agent for the Tredegar Valley District of the South Wales Miners' Federation; 1898–1919	Succeeded by George Davies
Preceded by New position	Treasurer of the South Wales Miners' Federation; 1898–1921	Succeeded by Oliver Harris
