= 1921 Caerphilly by-election =

UK Parliamentary by-election

← 1918	24 August 1921	1922 →
Candidate	Jones	Edmunds	Stewart
Party	Labour	Liberal	Communist
Popular vote	13,699	8,958	2,592
Percentage	54.2%	35.5%	10.3%
MP before election
Onions
Labour
Subsequent MP
Jones
Labour

The 1921 Caerphilly by-election was held on 24 August 1921. The by-election was held due to the death of the incumbent Labour MP, Alfred Onions. It was held for Labour by Morgan Jones.

== Candidates and campaign ==
Morgan Jones clinched the Labour nomination despite not being the preferred candidate of the South Wales Miners' Federation. He was the first conscientious objector to be elected to Parliament after World War I.

The Communist Party of Great Britain (CPGB) stood Bob Stewart, a member of its executive committee. The party had been founded in 1920, and this was its first Parliamentary election. It sent almost all its leading figures to campaign in the election.

== Result ==
Jones won an easy victory, with Edmunds in second, and the CPGB a distant third.

1921 Caerphilly by-election
Party	Candidate	Votes	%	±%
Labour	Morgan Jones	13,699	54.2	−0.6
Liberal	William Rees Edmunds	8,958	35.5	−9.7
Communist	Bob Stewart	2,592	10.3	N/A
Majority		4,741	18.7	+9.1
Turnout		25,249	73.2	+9.2
Registered electors		34,511		
Labour hold		Swing	+4.5	
