= Morgan Jones (British politician) =

British politician (1885–1939)

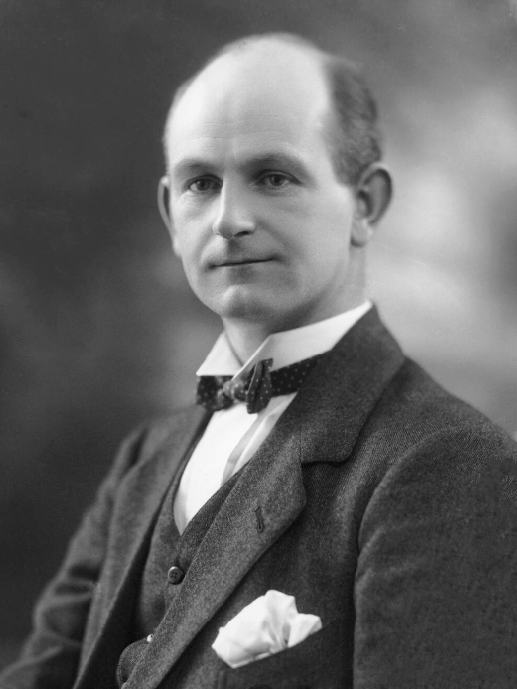
- Jones in 1922

Member of Parliament for Caerphilly
- In office 1921–1939
- Preceded by: Alfred Onions
- Succeeded by: Ness Edwards

Parliamentary Secretary to the Board of Education
- In office January 1924 – November 1924
- Preceded by: The Earl of Onslow
- Succeeded by: The Duchess of Atholl
- In office 1929–1931
- Preceded by: The Duchess of Atholl
- Succeeded by: Sir Kingsley Wood

Personal details
- Born: 3 May 1885 Gelligaer, Wales
- Died: 23 April 1939 (aged 53)
- Party: Labour Party; Independent Labour Party
- Spouse: Gladys Thomas (m. 1923)
- Children: 2 daughters (Brenda and Margaret)
- Education: Lewis School, Pengam; University College, Reading
- Occupation: Teacher, Politician

Morgan Jones (3 May 1885 – 23 April 1939) was a Welsh Labour Party politician who made history as the first conscientious objector to be elected to the Parliament of the United Kingdom following the First World War. He served as Member of Parliament for Caerphilly from 1921 until his death in 1939, and held ministerial office as Parliamentary Secretary to the Board of Education in both of the first two Labour governments.

== Early life and education ==
Jones was born on 3 May 1885 in the village of Gelligaer at the foot of Gelligaer mountain. His birthplace was the small Rhos Cottages, close to the ancient parish church of St Catwg. His father, Elias, was a local collier born in the hamlet of Llanwonno, near Mountain Ash, known for his sobriety, dependability and hard work. His mother, Sarah Ann, originally from the village of Llanfabon, was described as a strong and formidable woman with an earthy sense of humour and bright blue eyes.

Jones attended primary schools in Gelligaer and Hengoed before winning a scholarship to study at Lewis School, Pengam. He matriculated from Lewis School in 1901 and began training as a pupil teacher in Gilfach Boys' School, Bargoed, before gaining admission to University College, Reading, where he studied 'Education and the Arts'. He subsequently returned to the Rhymney Valley in 1907 and became a teacher at Gilfach Boys' School. Jones served as president of the Glamorgan Federation of Teachers from 1913 to 1915. He also became a Baptist lay preacher.

== Early political career ==
Jones joined the Independent Labour Party (ILP) in 1908, influenced both by the social conditions in the coal mining communities of the Rhymney Valley and by his religious non-conformist upbringing. He helped establish the Rhymney Valley's first ILP branch. Jones was elected to Gelligaer Urban District Council in March 1911, describing himself as a 'socialist' and winning by a majority of only 11 votes. He served as chairman of the council in 1921–22. As Chairman of the Housing Committee, he proved to be an effective and committed councillor, making housing his pre-occupation. Due largely to Jones' efforts, Gelligaer UDC became one of the most forward-looking local authorities in South Wales, building quality council houses throughout its area, but especially in Bargoed, with nearly 1,000 council houses constructed under his oversight.

After the First World War, he was elected to Glamorgan County Council in a by-election in December 1919, though he faced collective snubbing from fellow councillors who offered no welcome or congratulations.

== First World War and imprisonment ==
During the First World War, Jones opposed the conflict on both religious and political grounds. As a Christian pacifist influenced by his mother's Baptist beliefs that disagreements should never be resolved by force, he refused military service and became a conscientious objector. He was a member of the No Conscription Fellowship's national committee and chairman of the South Wales Anti-Conscription Council.

=== Tribunals and arrest ===
When the Military Service Act 1916 introduced conscription, Jones received his call-up papers. A local tribunal was established, and Jones appeared before it in a packed courtroom in Bargoed, where he declared he was a "socialist" and was "resolutely opposed to all warfare", stating that the war was the product of "wrong-headed diplomacy". The tribunal concluded that Jones could be excluded from military service but not from alternative service. When Jones refused to accept this, he appealed unsuccessfully to an Appeals Tribunal in Cardiff.

On 29 May 1916, Jones was arrested at his parents' home in Bargoed by a local police inspector who was described as "most courteous and polite". He was taken to Cardiff where he appeared before the Magistrates Court, was fined 2/- and sentenced to four months' imprisonment for refusing to obey military orders. On 30 May 1916, he also appeared before Caerphilly Magistrates' Court, where he was found guilty of being an 'absentee', fined £2, and placed in the hands of the military.

=== Imprisonment and hardship ===
Jones faced a military court martial and, despite never having served in the armed forces, was found guilty of "desertion" under the Military Service Act and sentenced to "sheer hard labour". He began his sentence at Kinmel Park Army Camp in North Wales before being transferred to Wormwood Scrubs prison in London, where he endured periods of solitary confinement, personal abuse, and survived on a poor diet.

The harsh conditions severely affected his physical and mental health. By November 1916, his deteriorating condition led him to reconsider his position, and he shifted from being an "absolutist" conscientious objector to an "alternativist", accepting non-combatant work that did not directly involve bearing arms. He was subsequently transferred to a Home Office Work Centre at Warwick. Jones remained in detention in various forms until the end of 1917.

The price of his pacifist stance extended beyond imprisonment. He lost his teaching position and was forced to work as a labourer in a local colliery for the first time in his life. The controversy also placed enormous strain on his family, as one of his brothers faced military service despite poor health, whilst another brother, also a conscientious objector, was forced to leave his teaching post.

== Parliamentary career ==
=== 1921 by-election ===
Following the death of Labour MP Alfred Onions in July 1921, Jones secured the Labour nomination for the 1921 Caerphilly by-election despite not being the preferred candidate of the powerful South Wales Miners' Federation. The Communist Party of Great Britain, founded in 1920, contested its first parliamentary election with Bob Stewart as their candidate, sending almost all its leading figures to campaign. Jones won the election on 24 August 1921 with an easy victory, with the Liberal candidate Edmunds in second place and the Communist candidate a distant third. His victory made him the first conscientious objector to be elected to Parliament after World War I.

=== Parliamentary service ===
Jones served as MP for Caerphilly from 1921 until his death in 1939, winning re-election six times. During his parliamentary career, he served as Parliamentary Secretary to the Board of Education in both of the first two Labour governments: from January to November 1924, and again from 1929 to 1931. Though these governments did not prioritise major educational reforms, Jones was amongst the first to articulate the need for free, 'comprehensive' secondary education for all, laying important groundwork for Labour's later comprehensive education policies.

=== Committee and shadow roles ===
During the 1930s, when Labour was reduced to a parliamentary rump following the 1931 election, Jones became one of Labour's frontbench spokesmen on foreign affairs, as well as serving as Labour's Education spokesman and Chair of a House of Commons Select Committee. In his foreign affairs role, he focused particularly on India, Palestine, and the British West Indies.

Jones was appointed to a Royal Commission investigating conditions in the British West Indies in 1938, work that occupied him until his death.

== Welsh devolution advocacy ==
Throughout his career, Jones was a fervent Welsh patriot who argued for distinctive Welsh policies decades before the term "devolution" was coined. In 1923, he became the original secretary of the first official grouping of Welsh Labour MPs. The following year, whilst serving as Parliamentary Secretary to the Board of Education, he argued from within government for the devolution of education policy to a Welsh National Council for Education.

Jones was a fluent Welsh speaker, a regular Eisteddfod participant, and a proud member of the Court of the University of Wales. In 1938, he led a cross-party delegation to meet Prime Minister Neville Chamberlain to argue for the creation of a Secretary of State for Wales position—an unsuccessful initiative that nonetheless represented a significant early bid for distinctive Welsh politics.

== Evolution on pacifism and foreign policy ==
Following Adolf Hitler's rise to power in 1933 and the growth of fascism across Europe, Jones underwent a profound intellectual and moral struggle regarding his pacifist beliefs. His close connections with the Jewish community in Golders Green, where he lived for a time with his family, made him acutely aware of Nazi persecution.

After considerable soul-searching, Jones concluded that the pacifism he had embraced could not stop the advance of fascist evil. He therefore supported the replacement of the pacifist George Lansbury with Clement Attlee as Labour Party leader in 1935, publicly explaining why he believed pacifism was inadequate to confront the Nazi threat. Like many democratic socialists of his generation who had witnessed the horrors of the First World War, Jones came to believe that democracy and freedom could only be defended through preparedness to use military force in cooperation with allies.

== Personal life ==
In 1923, Jones married Gladys Thomas, who was also a teacher and ILP member. The couple had two daughters, Brenda and Margaret.

== Death and legacy ==
Jones died on 23 April 1939, aged 53, after suffering his third heart attack. His successor as MP for Caerphilly was Ness Edwards, who was also a former conscientious objector. The 1939 Caerphilly by-election was held on 4 July 1939 to choose his replacement.

Jones's legacy includes his role as a pioneer of both conscientious objection in Parliament and early Welsh devolution advocacy. Morgan Jones Park in Caerphilly is named in his honour, and in 2021, on the centenary of his election, a commemorative information board was unveiled in the park.

Modern assessments recognise Jones as a man of principle who demonstrated the capacity to evolve his views when confronted with changing circumstances, particularly regarding the rise of fascism. His biographer, previous Caerphilly MP Wayne David, has described him as embodying both principle and pragmatism in his approach to democratic socialism.

Parliament of the United Kingdom
Preceded by Alfred Onions	Member of Parliament for Caerphilly; 1921–1939	Succeeded by Ness Edwards
Political offices
Preceded by The Earl of Onslow	Parliamentary Secretary to the Board of Education; January–November 1924	Succeeded by The Duchess of Atholl
Preceded by The Duchess of Atholl	Parliamentary Secretary to the Board of Education; 1929–1931	Succeeded by Sir Kingsley Wood
