= Richard Onslow, 5th Earl of Onslow =

British nobleman and politician

The Right Honourable The Earl of Onslow GBE GCStJ PC DL
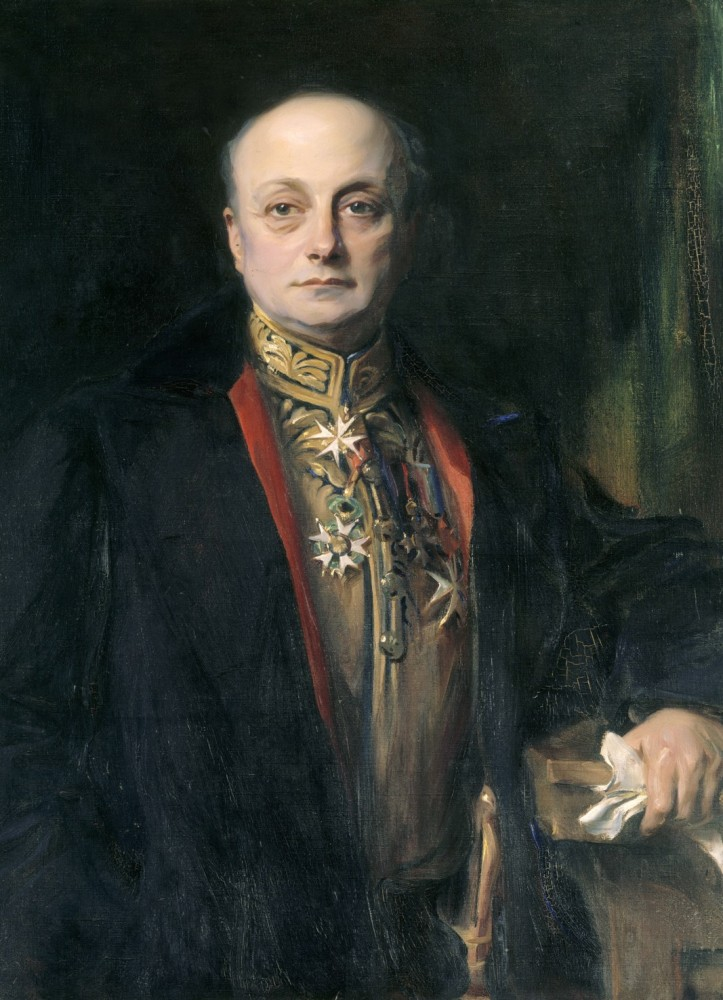
- 1928 portrait

Chairman of Committees
- In office 1931–1944
- Monarchs: George V Edward VIII; George VI
- Lord Chancellor: The Viscount Sankey; The Viscount Hailsham; The Viscount Maugham; The Viscount Caldecote; The Viscount Simon
- Preceded by: The Earl of Donoughmore
- Succeeded by: The Lord Stanmore

Paymaster General
- In office 1928–1929
- Monarch: George V
- Prime Minister: Stanley Baldwin
- Preceded by: The Duke of Sutherland
- Succeeded by: The Lord Arnold

Under-Secretary of State for War
- In office 1924–1928
- Prime Minister: Stanley Baldwin
- Secretary: The Earl of Derby
- Preceded by: Clement Attlee
- Succeeded by: The Duke of Sutherland

Personal details
- Born: 23 August 1876
- Died: 9 June 1945 (aged 68) Guildford, Surrey, England
- Party: Conservative
- Spouse: Violet Marcia Catherine Warwick Bampfylde (m. 1906)
- Children: 2
- Parents: The 4th Earl of Onslow; Florence Gardner
- Education: New College, Oxford

Richard William Alan Onslow, 5th Earl of Onslow (23 August 1876 – 9 June 1945), styled Viscount Cranley until 1911, was a British peer, diplomat, parliamentary secretary and government minister.

== Background and education ==
Viscount Cranley was the eldest son of William Onslow, 4th Earl of Onslow, and Florence Coulston Gardner. He was educated at Eton and New College, Oxford before joining the Diplomatic Service in 1901.

== Diplomatic career ==
He became an attaché to Madrid a year later, Third Secretary to Tangier in 1903 and to St Petersburg in 1904 and Second Secretary to Berlin in 1907. In 1909, he became assistant private secretary to Sir Edward Grey, the Secretary of State for Foreign Affairs. He then held a number of positions in the Foreign Office as a clerk in 1910, private secretary to the Under-Secretary of State for Foreign Affairs from 1911 to 1913 and assistant clerk from 1913 to 1914.

== Military career ==
Onslow joined the army on the outbreak of World War I in 1914, being commissioned as a second lieutenant on 15 June 1915. He was mentioned in despatches three times, received an OBE and the French Legion of Honour. In later years he was honorary lieutenant-colonel of the 3rd Battalion Queen's Royal Regiment (West Surrey) and honorary colonel of the 30th (Surrey) Searchlight Regiment, Royal Artillery.

== Political career ==
Onslow had succeeded to his father's title and seat in the House of Lords in 1911. After the war, he was a Lord-in-waiting from 1919 to 1920, a Civil Lord of the Admiralty from 1920 to 1921, Parliamentary Secretary to the Ministry of Agriculture and Fisheries in 1921, Parliamentary Secretary to the Ministry of Health from 1921 to 1923, Parliamentary Secretary to the Board of Education from 1923 to 1924, Under-Secretary of State for War and vice-president of the Army Council from 1924 to 1928, and chairman of the Committees and Deputy Speaker of the House of Lords from 1931 to 1944. He was appointed a Privy Counsellor in the 1926 Birthday Honours.

Onslow was also president of the Royal Statistical Society from 1905 to 1906 and president of the Zoological Society of London from 1936 to 1942.

Onslow was the donor of 6 acres (2.4 ha) of land at the top of Stag Hill, Guildford in 1933 on which Guildford Cathedral was built.

== Writings ==
Onslow devoted much of his retirement to writing, producing The Empress Maud (1939); Sixty-three Years: Diplomacy, the Great War and Politics, with Notes on Travel, Sport and Other Things (1939), which went through several editions; and The Dukes of Normandy and Their Origin (1945), which was completed in the year of his death and published posthumously.

== Family ==
Lord Onslow married Violet Marcia Catherine Warwick Bampfylde, the only daughter of Coplestone Bampfylde, 3rd Baron Poltimore, on 22 February 1906. They had two children:

- Lady Mary Florence Violet Margaret Onslow
- William Arthur Bampfylde Onslow, 6th Earl of Onslow (born 11 June 1913, died 3 June 1971)

Lord Onslow died on 9 June 1945, aged 68, and was succeeded in the peerage by his only son.

As Dowager Countess of Onslow, Violet gave the future Queen Elizabeth II a diamond and ruby butterfly brooch as a wedding gift in 1947. She died on 23 October 1954.

Political offices
Preceded by The Earl of Jersey	Lord-in-waiting; 1919–1920	Succeeded by The Earl of Lucan
Preceded by The Earl of Lytton	Civil Lord of the Admiralty; 1920–1921	Succeeded by Bolton Eyres-Monsell
Vacant Title last held by Sir Arthur Griffith-Boscawen	Parliamentary Secretary to the Ministry of Agriculture and Fisheries; 5 April–7 April 1921	Succeeded by The Earl of Ancaster
Preceded by Waldorf Astor	Parliamentary Secretary to the Ministry of Health; 1921–1923	Succeeded by Lord Eustace Percy
Preceded by Lord Eustace Percy	Parliamentary Secretary to the Board of Education; 1923–1924	Succeeded by Morgan Jones
Preceded by Clement Attlee	Under-Secretary of State for War; 1924–1928	Succeeded by The Duke of Sutherland
Preceded by The Duke of Sutherland	Paymaster General; 1928–1929	Succeeded by The Lord Arnold
Preceded by The Earl of Donoughmore	Chairman of Committees of the House of Lords; 1931–1944	Succeeded by The Lord Stanmore
Academic offices
Preceded by Sir Francis Powell, Bt	President of the Royal Statistical Society; 1905–1906	Succeeded by Sir Richard Martin, Bt
Peerage of the United Kingdom
Preceded by William Hillier Onslow	Earl of Onslow; 1911–1945	Succeeded by William Arthur Bampfylde Onslow
