= 1939 Caerphilly by-election =

UK parliamentary by-election

The 1939 Caerphilly by-election was a parliamentary by-election held on 4 July 1939 for the British House of Commons constituency of Caerphilly.

== Previous MP ==
Morgan Jones was the previous member of Parliament. He died on 23 April 1939. He was a conscientious objector during the First World War.

== Previous result ==
General election 1935: Caerphilly
Party	Candidate	Votes	%	±%
Labour	Morgan Jones	24,846	76.2	+8.6
Conservative	GT Stoneham	7,738	23.8	−8.6
Majority		17,108	52.4	+17.2
Turnout		32,584	72.3	−4.3
Registered electors		45,057		
Labour hold		Swing		

== Candidates ==
Ness Edwards was a coal miner and during the first world war, a conscientious objector. Ronald Bell was a barrister, and later became a politician.

== Result ==
1939 Caerphilly by-election
Party	Candidate	Votes	%	±%
Labour	Ness Edwards	19,847	68.0	−8.2
Conservative	Ronald Bell	9,349	32.0	+8.2
Majority		10,498	36.0	−16.4
Turnout		29,196	68.4	−3.9
Registered electors		42,678		
Labour hold		Swing		

== Aftermath ==
General election 1945: Caerphilly
Party	Candidate	Votes	%	±%
Labour	Ness Edwards	29,158	80.2	+4.0
Conservative	John Frederick Manuel de Courcy	7,189	19.8	−4.0
Majority		21,969	60.4	+8.0
Turnout		36,347	77.2	+4.9
Registered electors		47,078		
Labour hold		Swing		
