= Bob Stewart (communist) =

British politician (1877–1971)

Robert J. Stewart (16 February 1877 – 1971) was a member of the Communist Party of Great Britain (CPGB) and was in charge of the underground cell which, in the 1930s, operated a clandestine transmitter in Wimbledon that relayed information between the CPGB and the Comintern in Moscow. He was the CPGB's spymaster and, at one stage, controlled the Cambridge Five.

== Biography ==
Stewart was born in Eassie, Angus, in Scotland, but grew up in Dundee. Stewart trained as a ship's carpenter from the age of twelve. He joined the Amalgamated Society of Carpenters and Joiners and was elected to the local management committee.

In the early 20th century Stewart moved to South Africa, but returned to Dundee to become the full-time organiser of the Scottish Prohibition Party. In 1908, he was elected to the town council, but he soon led a Marxist and anti-religious split, the Prohibition and Reform Party. In 1911, he became the full-time organiser of this organisation.

During the 1910s, Stewart worked as an organizer for the Scottish Horse and Motormen's Union and then the No Conscription Fellowship. He was imprisoned for opposition to World War I, then served in the British Army from 1917 to 1919. In these two years, he was court-martialed four times.

Stewart's party restarted activity after he was released. In his autobiography he claimed it was renamed the Socialist Prohibition and Reform Party, but there is no documentary evidence to support this. He began working with the Communist Unity Group and was a founder member of the CPGB, serving on its first Executive Committee. He stood for the party in the Dundee Town Council election in June 1921, polling 6,160 votes, and two months later in a by-election at Caerphilly. In 1922, he was appointed as the party's Scottish organizer, but was imprisoned for six months for sedition.

In 1923, Stewart went to work for the Comintern in Moscow, but stood in Dundee at the 1924, 1929 and 1931 general elections - in 1931, he took 10,261 votes. In 1925 he served as Acting General Secretary of the party, while the rest of the party leadership were in prison.

Stewart remained on the party's Executive Committee until 1936, when he became secretary of the Control Commission, the party's disciplinary body.

He moved to Moscow in early 1923 to work at Comintern headquarters. While there, he met several key Soviet leaders and attended Lenin's funeral. He was sent by the Comintern to many parts of Europe, because his British passport enabled him to travel at will.

In 1924, he was sent to Ireland to assist in the creation of a Communist Party there, which led to the creation of the Revolutionary Workers' Groups and eventual re-establishment of the Communist Party of Ireland in 1933. According to other colleagues, he 'was an easy-going communist' in Ireland and was 'the most useful man ever sent from Britain to Ireland', and the speech of Bob was "talked sense", while Larkin's speech was eloquent but nonsensical.

As the British representative on Comintern, Stewart attracted considerable attention from the British authorities. The three volumes of Stewart's MI5 file opened in September 1920 with a report from SIS that identified him as a Communist and 'a secret agent for England on behalf of the Third International'.

During 1940-50s, he shared an office with Jimmy Shield and was supported by Mrs.Bowman, a technical worker.

== Late Years ==
Stewart was staying in a room in a group of houses where old people are looked after at Fenstanton Avenue at his late years. He was still certainly hale and hearty but became more frail than before. His sight began to be failing at 1966, and finally got largely blind and was unable to read by 1967. He was still concerned about politics.Stewart was confused about the Cultural Revolution in China and affirmed that Red Guards could not be workers. He thought Communists in France and Italy did not do enough work in their armies, leading them away from power. He though the outlook was bleak that time due to the US interference in Vietnam, Egypt, and Israel-Arabic War, and the ruling of Wilson and Brown. He suggested that the Labour Party should be split.

Stewart published an account of his work, Breaking the Fetters, in 1967. He died in 1971 at the age of 94. At the time of his death, he was living in a retirement home in London paid for by the British Communist Party from funds received from the Communist Party of the Soviet Union.

== Legacy ==
In May 2023, Dundee-based journalist Graham Ogilvy gave a talk about Stewart at an event held by Dundee Trades Union Council. Regarding Stewart's legacy, Oglivy said: "Stewart firmly believed he was on the side of history acting to build socialism and stop fascism. He was a complex man – despite aiding the Soviet Union he was critical of the Nazi-Soviet pact, the invasion of Czechoslovakia and other aspects of Soviet policy. His story is amazing, however, and tragic too."

Files on him are available in the National Archives at Kew. One of the bundles, covering the period 1927–31, covers Stewart's contacts with Norwegian and Chinese communists in 1927. It also includes reports from an informant in Ireland about Stewart's activities there, including, in 1929–1930, contacts between the Irish Republican Army and the CPGB.

== Further information ==
Stewart had a daughter named Nannie, who attended school in Russia when Stewart lived there. 11 year old Nannie was present at a 1925 Communist Conference when a large force of police entered the hall in St Mungo Hall in Govan where the event was taking place, and instructed all the women present to speak (so that their nationality could be identified.) Helen Crawfurd was first to reply, speaking in a broad Scots accent. and her initiative was taken on by others; one of the other delegates responding in Esperanto, and Nannie in Russian. When asked what she had replied, she was reported to have replied: "I told them I didn't know what they meant and didn't care".
