= Parliamentary Secretary to the Ministry of Health =

The Parliamentary Secretary to the Ministry of Health was a junior ministerial office in the United Kingdom Government.

The Ministry of Health was created in 1919 as a reconstruction of the Local Government Board. Local government functions were eventually transferred to the Minister of Housing and Local Government, leaving the Health Ministry in charge of Health proper.

From 1968 it was amalgamated with the Ministry of Social Security under the Secretary of State for Social Services, until a demerger of the Department of Health and Social Security on 25 July 1988.

The office became the Parliamentary Under-Secretary of State for Health and Social Security.

== Parliamentary Secretaries to the Ministry of Health, 1919-1968 ==
Name	Entered office	Left office
Waldorf Astor	24 June 1919	7 April 1921
Richard Onslow, 5th Earl of Onslow	7 April 1921	25 May 1923
Lord Eustace Percy	25 May 1923	23 January 1924
Arthur Greenwood	23 January 1924	11 November 1924
Sir Kingsley Wood	11 November 1924	11 June 1929
Susan Lawrence	11 June 1929	22 September 1931
Ernest Simon	22 September 1931	10 November 1931
Ernest Brown	10 November 1931	30 September 1932
Geoffrey Shakespeare	30 September 1932	30 July 1936
Robert Hudson	30 July 1936	28 May 1937
Robert Bernays	28 May 1937	14 July 1939
Florence Horsbrugh	14 July 1939	26 May 1945
Hamilton Kerr	26 May 1945	26 July 1945
Charles Key	4 August 1945	12 February 1947
John Edwards	12 February 1947	1 February 1949
Arthur Blenkinsop	1 February 1949	3 November 1951
Patricia Hornsby-Smith	3 November 1951	18 January 1957
John Vaughan-Morgan	18 January 1957	17 September 1957
Richard Thompson	17 September 1957	22 October 1959
Edith Pitt	22 October 1959	16 July 1962
Bernard Braine	16 July 1962	6 September 1962
Bernard Braine and Peter Legh, 4th Baron Newton	6 September 1962	24 March 1964
Bernard Braine, Peter Legh, 4th Baron Newton and Peter Kerr, 12th Marquess of Lothian	24 March 1964	1 April 1964
Bernard Braine and Peter Kerr, 12th Marquess of Lothian	1 April 1964	16 October 1964
Barnett Stross	20 October 1964	24 February 1965
Charles Loughlin	24 February 1965	7 January 1967
Julian Snow	7 January 1967	1 November 1968
Became the Parliamentary Under-Secretary of State for Health and Social Security
