= Parliamentary Secretary to the Board of Education =

Junior ministerial office

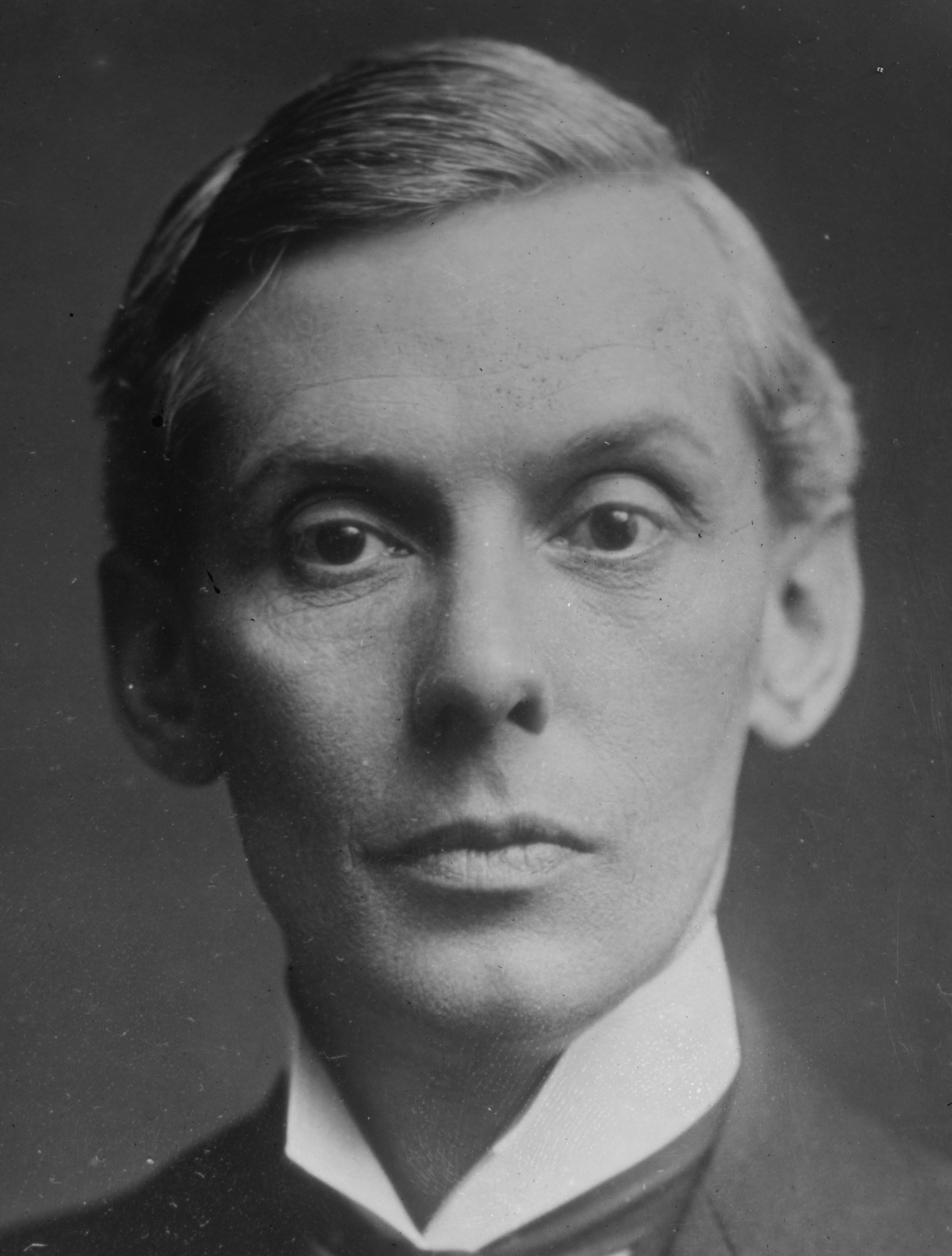
Christopher Addison held his first ministerial position as Parliamentary Secretary to the Board of Education from 1914 to 1915.

The Parliamentary Secretary to the Board of Education was a junior ministerial office in the United Kingdom Government. The Board of Education Act 1899 abolished the Committee of the Privy Council which had been responsible for education matters and instituted a new Board of Education from 1 April 1900. The Board was headed by a President. From the appointment of Charles Vane-Tempest-Stewart, 6th Marquess of Londonderry as president in the Balfour government in August 1902 the post of Parliamentary Secretary to the Board was established.

Under the provisions of the Education Act 1944, which was promoted by James Chuter Ede as Parliamentary Secretary (with Rab Butler as President) during the Churchill war ministry, the Board was in turn replaced by the Ministry of Education in August 1944. The post of Parliamentary Secretary to the Board was accordingly replaced by the Parliamentary Secretary to the Ministry of Education. Chuter Ede remained in that position until the War coalition was dissolved in May 1945.

== Parliamentary Secretaries to the Board of Education, 1902-1944 ==
| Name | Entered office | Left office |
|---|---|---|
| Sir William Anson, 3rd Baronet | 11 August 1902 | 1905 |
| Thomas Lough | 1905 | 1908 |
| Thomas McKinnon Wood | 1908 | 1908 |
| Charles Trevelyan | 1908 | 1914 |
| Christopher Addison | 1914 | 1915 |
| Herbert Lewis | 1915 | 1923 |
| Lord Eustace Percy | 1923 | 1923 |
| Richard Onslow, 5th Earl of Onslow | 1923 | 1924 |
| Morgan Jones | 1924 | 1924 |
| Katharine Stewart-Murray, Duchess of Atholl | 1924 | 1929 |
| Morgan Jones | 1929 | 1931 |
| Sir Kingsley Wood | 1931 | 1931 |
| Herwald Ramsbotham | 1931 | 1935 |
| Herbrand Sackville, 9th Earl De La Warr | 1935 | 1936 |
| Geoffrey Shakespeare | 1936 | 1937 |
| Kenneth Lindsay | 1937 | 1940 |
| James Chuter Ede | 1940 | 3 August 1944 |
