= 1913 Chorley by-election =

UK parliamentary by-election

The 1913 Chorley by-election was a Parliamentary by-election held on 19 February 1913. It returned one Member of Parliament (MP) to the House of Commons of the United Kingdom, elected by the first past the post voting system. Although it was a safe Unionist seat which was held, the reduction in the Unionist majority was notable.

== Vacancy ==
The Conservative MP since 1895 was Lord Balcarres. Upon the death of his father on 31 January 1913, he inherited the title of the Earl of Crawford and a seat in the House of Lords. This meant that he had to resign his seat in the House of Commons.

== Electoral history ==
The Conservative candidate had won every election here since the seat was created in 1885. Balcarres's victory margin at the last election was comfortable.

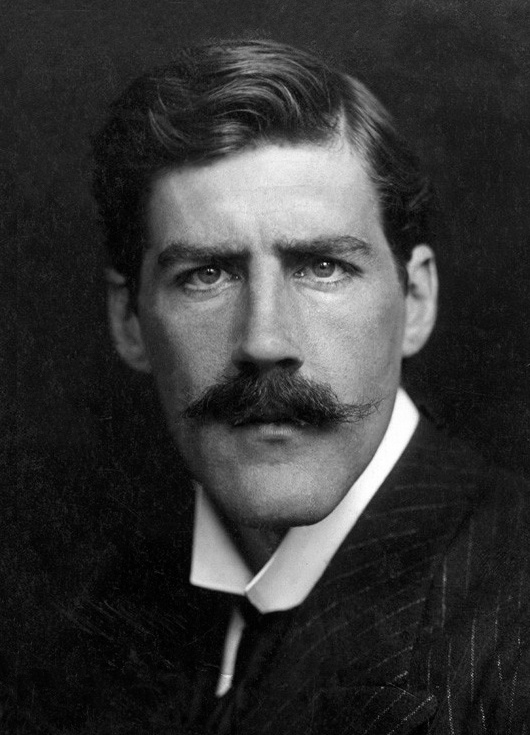
Lord Balcarres

General election December 1910: Chorley Electorate 14,347
Party	Candidate	Votes	%	±%
Conservative	David Lindsay	7,423	60.3	+2.0
Liberal	John Peter Todd Jackson	4,887	39.7	−2.0
Majority		2,536	20.6	+4.0
Turnout		23,310	85.8	−6.6
Conservative hold		Swing	+2.0	

== Candidates ==
- On 8 February the Unionists adopted 63-year-old Sir Henry Hibbert to defend the seat. He was standing for parliament for the first time. He was Chairman of Lancashire County Council and had been Mayor of Chorley from 1889 to 1891 and had been made a Freeman of the Borough of Chorley.
- On 8 February the Liberal Party again adopted John Peter Todd Jackson, who had contested the seat at the last General Election. He was a 45-year-old Chorley man, who was a local Justice of the Peace and cotton manufacturer.
- The Labour Party decided not to field a candidate.

== Campaign ==
Nomination closed on 14 February confirming a two-way contest.

The Unionist candidate Sir Henry Hibbert was a leading proponent of full Tariff Reform who had done much to define the policy in the 1880s. However, the Unionist national leadership had decided by 1913 to shelve the policy with respect to food duties. This placed Hibbert in conflict with his own party leadership as he continued to argue his position during the campaign.

There was a large number of Roman Catholics among the electorate, thought to number up to 4,000. However, not many were Irish, so may not have been so automatically disposed to support for the Liberals Third Irish Home Rule Bill currently being passed by the House of Commons. The Unionists attempted to retain their support through their defence of the denominational schools system. The Liberals were considering introducing an education bill to enable the establishment of non-denominational schools.

About 2,300 trade union members were among the electorate. There was not a strong tradition of trade union support for the Liberals in this part of Lancashire. Liberal MP Clement Edwards a barrister with a history of working for the trade union movement, was leading a Liberal campaign to win over Lancashire trade unionism. He worked with a local trade union defence committee to get posters displayed that criticised the Unionist Party opposition to the Trade Unions (No.2) Bill.

On 17 February in a message to the Unionist candidate, party leader Bonar Law said he would be "greatly disappointed if you do not retain it (the seat) by a majority as large as was given at the last election to Lord Balcarres."

== Result ==
On polling day at the close of poll Unionist headquarters were "confidently expecting that Sir Henry Hibbert's majority will exceed 2,000". Unsurprisingly, the Unionists held the seat. However, their majority fell by 5.6% to 1,967 as a result of a swing to the Liberals;

1913 Chorley by-election Electorate 15,135
Party	Candidate	Votes	%	±%
Unionist	Henry Hibbert	7,573	57.5	−2.8
Liberal	John Peter Todd Jackson	5,606	42.5	+2.8
Majority		1,967	15.0	−5.6
Turnout		13,179	87.1	+1.3
Unionist hold		Swing	-2.8	

The Liberal candidate John Jackson stated that he was content to have disappointed Bonar Law and to have reduced a Unionist majority in a by-election for the time since the general election.

== Aftermath ==
A General Election was due to take place by the end of 1915. Due to the outbreak of war, the election did not take place until 1918. The Liberal Party did not field a candidate and Jackson did not stand for parliament again. Hibbert retired from parliament and his successor held the seat.

General election 14 December 1918: Chorley Electorate 35,370
Party	Candidate	Votes	%	±%
Unionist	*Douglas Hacking	13,059	67.7	
Labour	Elijah Sandham	6,222	32.3	
Majority		6,837	35.4	
Turnout		19,896	54.5	
Unionist hold		Swing		

*was the endorsed candidate of the Coalition Government.
