= 1903 Chorley by-election =

UK parliamentary by-election

The 1903 Chorley by-election was held on 4 November 1903 when the incumbent Conservative MP, David Lindsay, was made Lord Commissioner of the Treasury. It was retained by Lindsay.

Chorley by-election, 1903
Party	Candidate	Votes	%	±%
Conservative	David Lindsay	6,226	56.5	N/A
Liberal	James Lawrence	4,798	43.5	N/A
Majority		1,428	13.0	N/A
Turnout		11,024	85.9	N/A
Conservative hold		Swing	N/A	
