= Hugh Emlyn-Jones =

British judge (1902–1970)

His Honour Hugh Emlyn-Jones JP (1902 – 9 June 1970), was a British judge and briefly a Liberal Party politician.

== Background ==
Emlyn Jones was the son of Evan and Ellen Jones of Newton-le-Willows, St Helens. He was educated at Manchester Grammar School and Manchester University where he won a First Class Honors in Law, after winning a Dauntesey University Legal Scholarship. He won the Vice-Chancellor of Lancaster’s Prize and John Peacock Prize. He married, in 1938, Morfudd Davies of Cardiff. They had one son.

== Politics ==
At the age of 27 Emlyn Jones was Liberal candidate for the Chorley Division of Lancashire at the 1929 General Election;

General Election 1929: Chorley Electorate 50,735
Party	Candidate	Votes	%	±%
Unionist	Douglas Hewitt Hacking	19,728	45.6	
Labour	William Taylor	18,369	42.4	
Liberal	Hugh Emlyn Jones	5,207	12.0	
Majority		1,359	3.1	
Turnout		43,304		
Unionist hold		Swing		

He did not stand for parliament again.

== Professional career ==
Emlyn-Jones started practicing law as a solicitor in Manchester. For 5 years he gave his services voluntarily as a Poor Man's Lawyer. He was called to the bar, Middle Temple in 1930 and practised on the Wales and Chester Circuit and in London. He was standing counsel for the Post Office on Circuit. He served in the RAF in the War of 1939–45, firstly as an intelligence officer with 604 Squadron and later on the Air Staff as an acting wing commander. He was made an honorary squadron leader in the RAF. After the war he became a judge of the County Courts, on Circuit No. 7 (Birkenhead, Chester, etc.) from 1950–65. He also served as a Justice of the peace.
