= George Rodgers (politician) =

British politician

Member of Parliament for Chorley
- In office February 1974 – 1979
- Preceded by: Constance Monks
- Succeeded by: Den Dover

Personal details
- Born: 7 November 1925 Liverpool, England
- Died: 15 February 2000 (aged 74)
- Party: Labour
- Children: 3 (including Julie)
- Profession: Politician, union activist, welder
- Awards: Arctic Convoy and Normandy landing decorations

Military service
- Branch/service: Royal Navy
- Years of service: 1943–1946
- Battles/wars: World War II

George Rodgers (7 November 1925 – 15 February 2000) was a British Labour Party politician.

Rodgers was Member of Parliament (MP) for the marginal Chorley seat from 1974 to 1979, when he lost to the Conservative Den Dover.

== Biography ==
=== Early life ===
Rodgers was born in Liverpool, the son of a joiner, and educated locally. During the second world war, he served in the navy (1943–46), earning decorations after dangerous Arctic convoys and on the Normandy landings.

Back home, he trained as a welder, working first for White's in Widnes, then Eaves in Blackpool, Costain's and, finally, BICC. Like most leftwing engineers, George was active both in his union and in local politics. He was heavily involved in the Amalgamated Engineering Union. In 1964, he was elected to Huyton local council, later becoming its chairman.

=== Member of Parliament ===
Rodgers was persuaded to go for the marginal Chorley seat, which had been tenuously held for Labour by a local sheep-farmer Clifford Kenyon and lost to Conservative, Constance Monks the prior election. He won the seat by 405 votes in February 1974, during the election which brought Harold Wilson unexpectedly back to power. The MP then increased his majority to a 2,713 the following election in October of that year.

George was lately popular with fellow Labour MPs, becoming chairman of their north-west group. Pro-Arab and anti-common market, he pushed for industrial investment to mop up unemployment. He found the existence of the House of Lords "an offensive absurdity". He was considered a member of Old Labour due to his connections with trade unions.

In 1979, he lost his seat to Conservative, Den Dover, as part of a slew of wins for the Conservative leader, Margaret Thatcher.

George tried for Pendle in 1983, and in 1986 was on Labour's shortlist at the Knowsley North by-election. But the man selected was his daughter Julie's husband, Sir George Howarth, now the Parliamentary Under-Secretary of State for Northern Ireland.

== Legacy ==
Rodgers died in 2000 aged 74, leaving behind a wife, two daughters, and a son.

He spent his life serving the Labour Party and Unions.

Parliament of the United Kingdom
| Preceded by Constance Monks | Member of Parliament for Chorley; February 1974 – 1979 | Succeeded by Den Dover |
