= Alistair Bell =

British politician

Alistair Watson Bell (31 March 1930 – 2 August 2012) was a British Circuit judge and Liberal Party politician.

== Background ==
Bell was born in Edinburgh, only son of Albert William Bell and Alice Elizabeth Watson. He was educated at Lanark Grammar School, George Watson's College and the Universities of Edinburgh (MA) and Wadham College, Oxford (MA, BCL). In 1957 he married Patricia Margaret Seed. They had two daughters and a son.

== Professional career ==
Bell served as a 2nd Lieutenant in the Royal Army Service Corps in 1955. In 1955 he received a Call to the bar, by Middle Temple. He entered practice on the Northern Circuit in 1957. He was a Recorder of the Crown Court from 1972 to 1978 and Honorary Recorder at Carlisle from 1990 to 1998. He served as a Circuit Judge from 1978 to 1997.

== Political career ==
Bell was Liberal candidate for the Chorley division of Lancashire at the 1964 General Election. He was then Liberal candidate for the Westmorland division at the 1966 General Election. He did not stand for parliament again.

=== Electoral record ===
General election 1964: Chorley
| Party | Candidate | Votes | % | ±% |
|---|---|---|---|---|
| Labour | Clifford Kenyon | 24,710 | 48.4 | −2.3 |
| Conservative | John Sutcliffe | 20,997 | 41.1 | −8.2 |
| Liberal | Alistair Bell | 5,331 | 10.5 | N/A |
| Majority | | 3,713 | 7.3 | +6.0 |
| Turnout | | 51,038 | 84.6 | −1.1 |
| Labour hold | | Swing | +3.0 | |

General election 1966: Westmorland
| Party | Candidate | Votes | % | ±% |
|---|---|---|---|---|
| Conservative | Michael Jopling | 17,907 | 50.5 | −1.2 |
| Liberal | Alistair Bell | 9,052 | 25.6 | −4.4 |
| Labour | John E Dayton | 8,465 | 23.9 | +5.6 |
| Majority | | 8,855 | 24.9 | +3.2 |
| Turnout | | | 75.5 | −3.3 |
| Conservative hold | | Swing | +1.6 | |
