= Alfred Barnes (Labour politician) =

British politician (1887–1974)

The Right Honourable Alfred Barnes
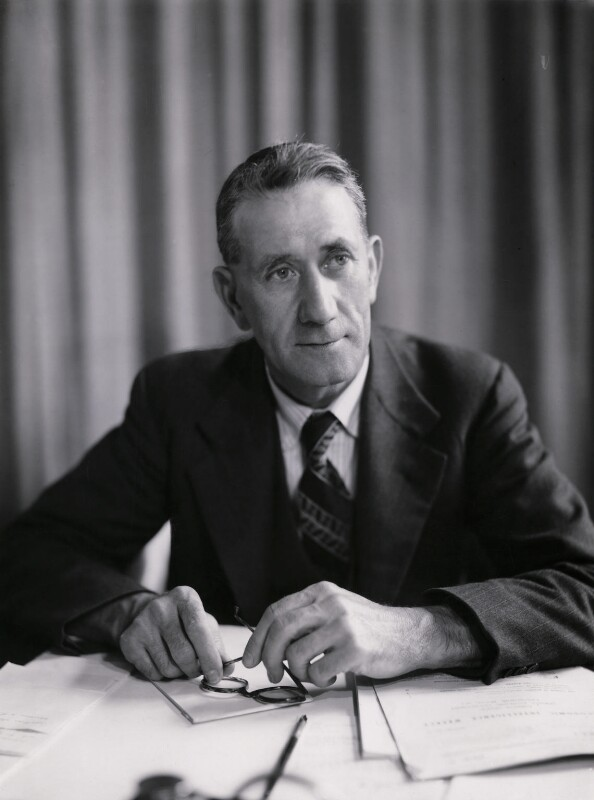
- Barnes in 1945

Minister of Transport
- In office 3 August 1945 – 26 October 1951
- Prime Minister: Clement Attlee
- Preceded by: The Lord Leathers
- Succeeded by: John Maclay

Chair of the Co-operative Party
- In office 1924–1945
- Preceded by: William Henry Watkins
- Succeeded by: William Coldrick

Member of Parliament for East Ham South
- In office 14 November 1935 – 26 May 1955
- Preceded by: Malcolm Campbell-Johnston
- Succeeded by: Albert Oram
- In office 15 November 1922 – 27 October 1931
- Preceded by: Clement Edwards
- Succeeded by: Malcolm Campbell-Johnston

Personal details
- Born: 17 July 1887 Plaistow, Newham, England
- Died: 26 November 1974 (aged 87) Walton-on-the-Naze, Essex, England
- Party: Labour and Co-operative
- Education: Northampton Institute; Central School of Arts and Crafts

Alfred John Barnes (17 July 1887 – 26 November 1974) was a British Labour and Co-operative politician.

Born in North Woolwich, he was the youngest child of William Barnes, a docker. His brother Billy became a professional footballer. Barnes lost a leg in a fairground accident at the age of 8. He was educated at the Northampton Institute and the Central School of Arts and Crafts.

Barnes worked originally as an artist in gold and silver. He was an early member of the Independent Labour Party and was heavily involved in the co-operative movement. He was chairman of the London Co-operative Society for nine years until 1923 and was a founder of the Co-operative Party. He became the Party's chairman in 1924 and served until 1945. He was also a director and President of the National Cooperative Publishing Society.

In November 1922, Barnes was elected as the Member of Parliament (MP) for East Ham South. In 1925, he was appointed a Labour Whip and served as a whip in Government, as Junior Lord of the Treasury. However, he was forced to resign in October 1930 - although his position as a director of the National Cooperative Publishing Society was unpaid, parliamentary rules dictated that a minister cannot be a director of a public company (although they could be of a private company): Barnes chose to remain on the co-op board rather than as a whip. Like many Labour MPs, he lost his seat in the 1931 general election but regained it in 1935.

In 1945, Barnes was made a Privy Counsellor and Minister of War Transport, later Minister of Transport, serving until the fall of the Labour government in 1951. He stood down as a Member of Parliament at the 1955 general election.

Parliament of the United Kingdom
Preceded by Clement Edwards	Member of Parliament for East Ham South; 1922–1931	Succeeded by Malcolm Campbell-Johnston
Preceded by Malcolm Campbell-Johnston	Member of Parliament for East Ham South; 1935–1955	Succeeded by Albert Oram
Political offices
Preceded by The Lord Leathers as Minister of War Transport	Minister of Transport; 1945–1951	Succeeded by John Maclay
Party political offices
Preceded by William Henry Watkins	Chair of the Co-operative Party; 1924–1945	Succeeded by William Coldrick
