= Jan David Simon, 3rd Viscount Simon =

British peer (1940–2021)

The Right Honourable The Viscount Simon
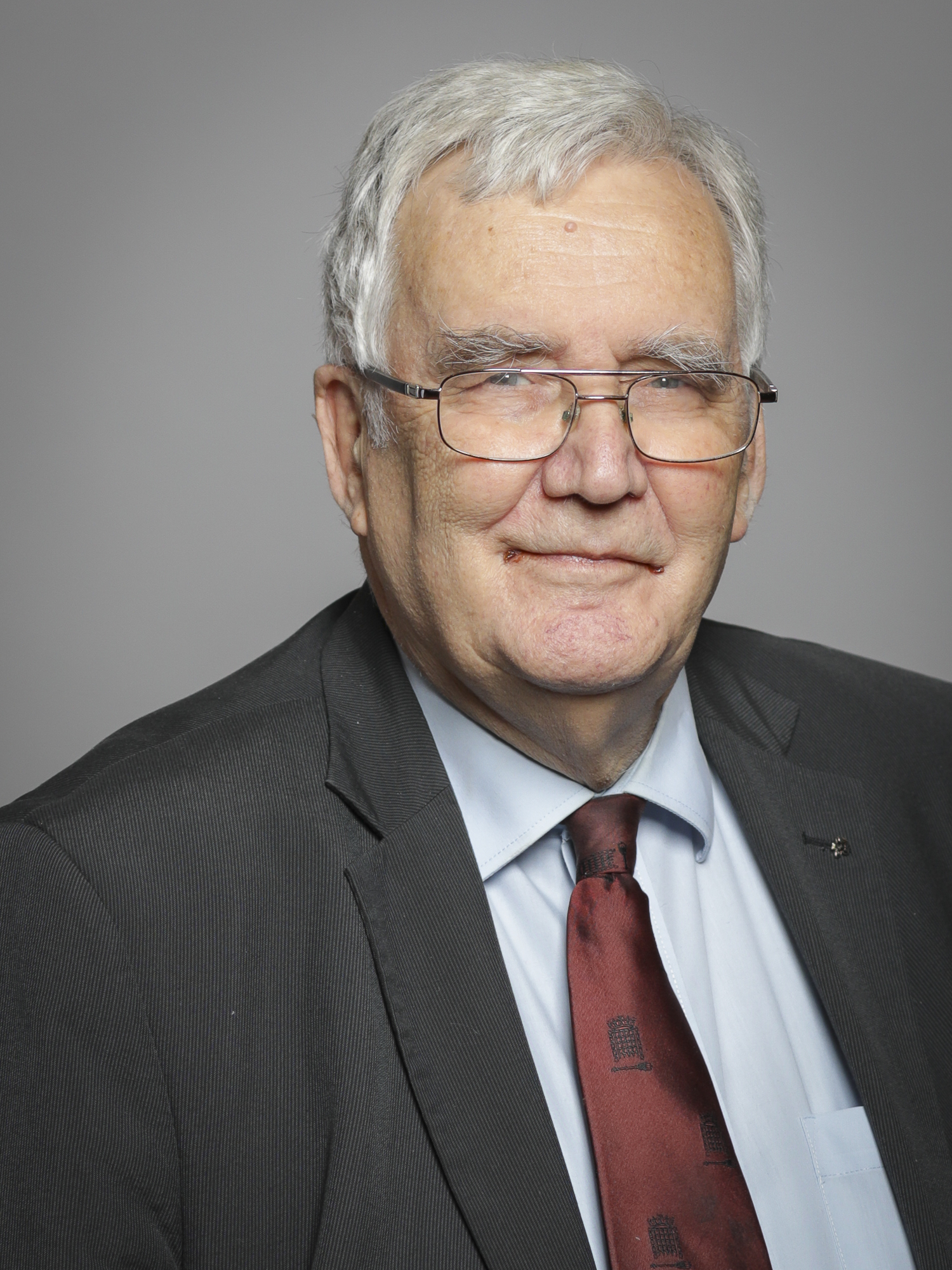
- Official portrait, 2019

Member of the House of Lords
- Lord Temporal
- Hereditary peerage 19 May 1994 – 11 November 1999
- Preceded by: The 2nd Viscount Simon
- Succeeded by: Seat abolished
- Elected Hereditary Peer; 11 November 1999 – 15 August 2021
- Election: 1999
- Preceded by: Seat established
- Succeeded by: The 3rd Baron Hacking

Personal details
- Born: Jan David Simon; 20 July 1940
- Died: 15 August 2021 (aged 81)
- Party: Labour
- Spouse: Mary Elizabeth Burns (m. 1969; died 2020)
- Children: 1

Jan David Simon, 3rd Viscount Simon (20 July 1940 – 15 August 2021), was a British hereditary peer and member of the House of Lords.

== Early life and education ==
Simon was born in 1940, the only son of John Simon, 2nd Viscount Simon, and his wife Christie Hunt. He was educated at Westminster School, at the School of Navigation, University of Southampton and at Sydney Technical College.

== Career ==
Simon succeeded to the viscountcy upon the death of his father in 1993 and became a member of the House of Lords in 1994. He was one of the ninety hereditary peers elected to remain in the House of Lords after the passing of the House of Lords Act 1999 and sat for the Labour Party.

Lord Simon was President of the Driving Instructors Association from 2000, and of GEM Motoring Assist from 2004.

== Marriage and children ==
Simon was married to Mary Elizabeth Burns from 1969 until her death in 2020. They had one daughter:

- Hon. Fiona Elizabeth Simon (born 15 May 1971)

== Death ==
Lord Simon died on 15 August 2021 at the age of 81. As he had no sons and as there were no other surviving male line heirs of the first viscount, the viscountcy became extinct upon his death.

== Arms ==
Coat of arms of Jan David Simon, 3rd Viscount Simon
Coronet A Coronet of a Viscount Crest Upon a Well proper an Eagle rising Or Escutcheon Gules three Lotus Flowers in pale proper between two Flaunches Or each charged with a Lion rampant of the field Supporters Dexter: a Guillemot; Sinister: a Monal proper Motto J'Ai Ainsi Mon Nom (Such is my name)

== Notes ==
Peerage of the United Kingdom
Preceded by John Simon	Viscount Simon; 1993–2021; Member of the House of Lords (1994–1999)	Extinct
Parliament of the United Kingdom
New office created by the House of Lords Act 1999	Elected hereditary peer to the House of Lords under the House of Lords Act 1999; 1999–2021	Succeeded by The Lord Hacking
