= Den Dover =

British politician

Densmore Ronald Dover
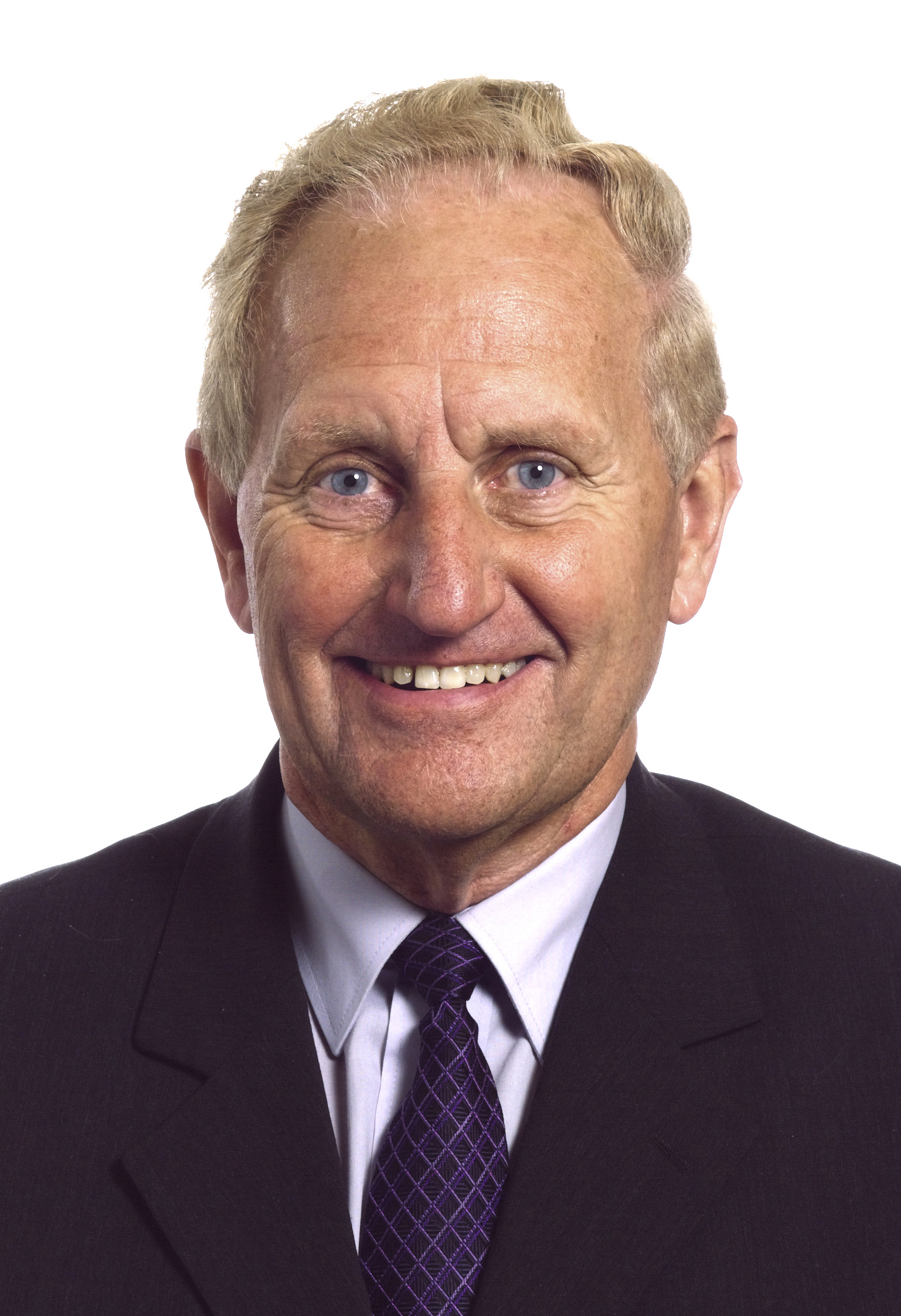
- Official portrait, c. 2004

Member of the European Parliament for North West England
- In office 10 June 1999 – 4 June 2009
- Preceded by: Position established
- Succeeded by: Nick Griffin

Member of Parliament for Chorley
- In office 3 May 1979 – 8 April 1997
- Preceded by: George Rodgers
- Succeeded by: Lindsay Hoyle

Personal details
- Born: 4 April 1938 (age 88) Stockton Heath, Cheshire, England
- Party: Conservative
- Education: University of Manchester
- Profession: Civil Engineer

Densmore Ronald Dover (born 4 April 1938) is a British politician. Representing the Conservative Party, he was the Member of Parliament (MP) for the constituency of Chorley from 1979 to 1997. He then served as a Member of the European Parliament (MEP) for the region of North West England, from 1999 to 2009.

He was forced to resign the position of Chief Whip, before being expelled from the party, over investigations into his expenses, and stood down from the European Parliament at the 2009 European Elections.

== Biography ==
Dover was born in Stockton Heath, Cheshire. Educated at King George V School, Southport until transferring to Manchester Grammar School where he won the bowling prize at cricket. Dover gained a First Class Honours degree in Civil Engineering at Manchester University.

=== Career ===
Dover worked in the construction industry across Europe, working for John Laing plc, George Wimpey, and as Chief Executive for the National Building Agency. Dover was latterly Director of Housing Construction with the Greater London Council, before entering politics on a full-time basis when he became an MP.

=== Personal life ===
Dover is married to Kathleen, with a son and a daughter, Amanda. He plays cricket, golf and hockey.

== Political career ==
Dover served on the London Borough of Barnet Council, and was a Member of its Education, Finance and Public Works Committees. He stood unsuccessfully for Parliament at Caerphilly in October 1974, being beaten by Labour's Fred Evans.

=== MP for Chorley ===
Dover served as the Conservative Member of Parliament for Chorley, from May 1979 to April 1997, until he was defeated by Labour candidate Lindsay Hoyle, a future Speaker of the House of Commons.

=== MEP for North West England ===
Dover was first elected to the European Parliament in 1999, and was re-elected in June 2004.

==== Resignation ====
Dover resigned as Conservative Chief Whip in the European Parliament on 6 June 2008. The revelation that forced the resignation was that over nine years he had paid his wife and daughter £750,000 from public funds. (This came after the Conservatives' Leader in Europe, Giles Chichester, resigned because he put large sums of money for secretarial and office work through the account of a company of which he was a paid director.)

Dover was forced to resign by acting Conservative MEP Leader, Philip Bushill-Matthews, who had been appointed only a day prior. Dover was replaced as Conservative Chief Whip by Richard Ashworth MEP.

An inquiry by the European Parliament found him guilty of a conflict of interest, and he was ordered to repay £500,000 of the expenses. The Parliament's ruling lead to Dover being expelled from the Conservative Party.

Dover's case was passed to the European Anti-Fraud Office for investigation. Dover stood down from the European Parliament at the 2009 European Elections. This ruling was later annulled in March 2011. Dover was not required to repay any expenses. Both the EU parliament and Dover were required bear their own costs.

Parliament of the United Kingdom
Preceded by George Rodgers	Member of Parliament for Chorley; 1979 – 1997	Succeeded by Lindsay Hoyle
European Parliament
New constituency	Member of European Parliament for North West England; 1999 – 2009	Succeeded by Nick Griffin
