= Albert Oram, Baron Oram =

British politician

Albert Edward Oram, Baron Oram (13 August 1913 – 5 September 1999) was a Co-operative and Labour politician in the United Kingdom.

Oram, the son of the blacksmith who made the beautiful railings around Chichester cathedral, was educated at Brighton, Hove and Sussex Grammar School and the London School of Economics. He became a teacher. In the Second World War he was initially recognised as a conscientious objector, but voluntarily renounced his exemption to join the army. He served in the Royal Artillery and landed in Normandy three days after D-Day, continuing on the campaign into Germany. After the war he briefly returned to teaching before moving in 1946 to work for the Co-operative Party as Research Officer. He advocated consumer welfare and democratising industrial relations, writing a series of publications including The People's Industry.

Oram attempted to win the parliamentary seats of Lewes, in 1945, where he was supported by the charismatic Harold Laski (who had greatly influenced him at LSE) and by his future wife Joan, and of Billericay, in 1950, where he lost despite winning 19,437 votes. He served as Labour and Co-operative Member of Parliament for East Ham South from 1955 to February 1974. His maiden speech concentrated on the successes of the cooperative movement. In January 1958 he introduced a private members bill to reform and speed up parliamentary procedures.

He was Parliamentary Secretary for Overseas Development 1964 to 1969 under Barbara Castle, Anthony Greenwood, Arthur Bottomley and his Parliamentary neighbour in East Ham, Reg Prentice; and a Government Whip 1976 to 1978 in the House of Lords. He accompanied the Prime Minister (Harold Wilson) on trips to Africa, including unsuccessful negotiations with Ian Smith after Rhodesia's Unilateral Declaration of Independence in 1965. He took a particular interest in promoting education in Africa, leading the UK Delegation to UNESCO and increasing resources for teacher training.

Oram was a European enthusiast and opponent of nuclear weapons. In October 1971 he was the only Labour and Co-operative MP to support the Conservative Government's motion to negotiate membership of the European Community. He became co-ordinator of the development programmes of the Co-operative Alliance in 1971 and held this office until 1973. He was a member of the Commonwealth Development Corporation in the years 1975 and 1976, and was made Chairman of the Co-operative Development Agency from 1978 to 1981. He was the Opposition Spokesman in the House of Lords on Overseas Development 1983–87.

On 22 January 1976 he was created a life peer taking the title Baron Oram, of Brighton in the County of East Sussex. He chaired the Boards of the Brighton Co-operative Society and of the League of Sussex Downsmen. He was a patron of Humanists UK until his death in 1999.

Parliament of the United Kingdom
Preceded by Alfred John Barnes	Member of Parliament for East Ham South; 1955–February 1974	constituency abolished
