= East Glamorganshire =

UK Parliament constituency (1885–1918)

- Former county constituency for the House of Commons

1885–1918
- Seats: one
- Created from: Glamorganshire
- Replaced by: Caerphilly, Pontypridd

East Glamorganshire was a parliamentary constituency in Glamorganshire, Wales. It returned one Member of Parliament (MP) to the House of Commons of the Parliament of the United Kingdom, elected by the first past the post system.

== Overview ==
The constituency was created by the Redistribution of Seats Act 1885 for the 1885 general election, and abolished for the 1918 general election. Throughout its existence it was held by the Liberal Party and it was a constituency largely dominated by the coal mining industry.

== Boundaries ==
Created in the redistribution of seats in 1885 & from the old Glamorganshire constituency which had been in existence since 1541, the seat covered a wide area that included Llantwit Fardre, Church Village, Tonteg, Pentyrch, Creigiau, Pontypridd, Caerphilly, Abercynon, Llanfabon, Gelligaer, Hengoed. It was abolished in the next redistribution of seats that took place in 1918.

== Members of Parliament ==
Election	Member	Party
1885	Sir Alfred Thomas	Liberal
1910	Clement Edwards	Liberal
1918	constituency abolished	

== History ==
Following the creation of the seat in 1885, there was a contest for the nomination. Following a meeting at Pontypridd, a number of candidates were proposed and invited to address public meetings. They included T. Marchant Williams, Lewis Morris and the Rev Aaron Davies. Ultimately the two leading candidates proved to be Alfred Thomas, a prominent figure in the public life of Cardiff, where he had served as Mayor in 1881–2, and William Bowen Rowlands, a Pembrokeshire-born lawyer. After a contest lasting several months, Rowlands withdrew, ostensibly to prevent a split in the Liberal vote following the appearance of a Conservative candidate. However, Rowlands was regarded as far less radical than his opponent. A leading Baptist, Thomas's victory owed much to his nonconformist connections, upon which this 'amiable and benevolent man' based much of his political outlook.

From the outset the Liberal Association in the constituency was constituted as 'The Liberal and Labour Association', and for 25 years Thomas held the seat without any significant threat from advocates of direct labour representation. As late as 1908 it held a perfunctory annual meeting where little significant business was transacted. The Conservatives put up a credible fight in 1892, 1895 and 1900, but in 1906 Thomas was returned unopposed.

By the end of the first decade of the twentieth century there were rumours that Thomas would retire and in 1907, Evan Thomas, a miners' agent, was nominated to contest the seat once the sitting member stood down. Thomas was. however, an ordained Baptist minister, and hardly regarded as a firebrand. Ultimately, however, Thomas decided to contest the January 1910 general election and comfortably saw off a Conservative challenger.

In April 1910, Thomas announced his retirement at the next General Election. The Liberal Association eschewed an opportunity to select a working man, with their chairman declaring that 'neither a Tory nor a Socialist should occupy the seat'. They opted for Clement Edwards. As a result, Charles Butt Stanton, miners' agent in the Aberdare Valley and a member of Aberdare Urban District Council emerged as a labour candidate but failed to win the endorsement of the Miners' Federation of Great Britain executive. He was beaten into third place.

At the General Election expected in 1915, Edwards would have been opposed by Alfred Onions. treasurer of the South Wales Miners' Federation. However, the war intervened, and by the 1918 General Election the seat had been abolished following extensive boundary changes and the creation of the new constituencies of Caerphilly and Pontypridd which would ultimately become Labour strongholds.

== Election results ==
=== Elections in the 1880s ===
General election 1885: East Glamorganshire
Party	Candidate	Votes	%	±%
Liberal	Alfred Thomas	4,886	70.1	
Conservative	Godfrey Lewis Bosville Clark	2,086	29.9	
Majority		2,800	40.2	
Turnout		6,972	81.6	
Registered electors		8,544		
Liberal win (new seat)				

General election 1886: East Glamorganshire
Party	Candidate	Votes	%	±%
Liberal	Alfred Thomas	Unopposed		
Liberal hold				

=== Elections in the 1890s ===
Thomas

General election 1892: East Glamorganshire
Party	Candidate	Votes	%	±%
Liberal	Alfred Thomas	5,764	67.3	N/A
Conservative	Herbert Clark Lewis, 2nd Baron Merthyr	2,797	32.7	New
Majority		2,967	34.6	N/A
Turnout		8,561	72.9	N/A
Registered electors		11,741		
Liberal hold		Swing	N/A	

General election 1895: East Glamorganshire
Party	Candidate	Votes	%	±%
Liberal	Alfred Thomas	6,055	60.8	−6.5
Conservative	Charles James Jackson	3,909	39.2	+6.5
Majority		2,146	21.6	−13.0
Turnout		9,964	76.8	+3.9
Registered electors		12,981		
Liberal hold		Swing	-6.5	

=== Elections in the 1900s ===
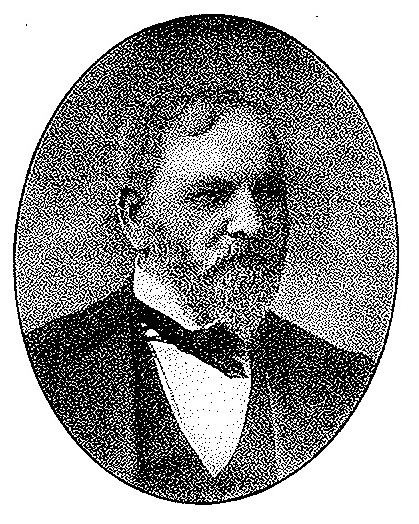
Thomas

General election 1900: East Glamorganshire
Party	Candidate	Votes	%	±%
Liberal	Alfred Thomas	6,994	63.2	+2.4
Conservative	Henry Edzell Morgan Lindsay	4,080	36.8	−2.4
Majority		2,914	26.3	+4.7
Turnout		11,074	72.3	−4.5
Registered electors		15,315		
Liberal hold		Swing	+2.4	

General election 1906: East Glamorganshire
Party	Candidate	Votes	%	±%
Liberal	Alfred Thomas	Unopposed		
Liberal hold				

=== Elections in the 1910s ===
General election January 1910: East Glamorganshire
Party	Candidate	Votes	%	±%
Liberal	Alfred Thomas	14,721	72.0	N/A
Conservative	Frank Hall Gaskell	5,727	28.0	New
Majority		8,994	44.0	N/A
Turnout		20,448	85.3	N/A
Liberal hold		Swing	N/A	

Edwards

General election December 1910: East Glamorganshire
Party	Candidate	Votes	%	±%
Lib-Lab	Clement Edwards	9,088	46.9	−25.1
Conservative	Frank Hall Gaskell	5,603	28.9	+0.9
Labour	Charles Stanton	4,675	24.1	New
Majority		3,485	18.0	−26.0
Turnout		19,366	80.8	−4.5
Lib-Lab hold		Swing	-13.0	

General Election 1914–15:

Another General Election was required to take place before the end of 1915. The political parties had been making preparations for an election to take place and by July 1914, the following candidates had been selected;

- Liberal: Clement Edwards
- Unionist: Henry Edzell Morgan Lindsay
- Labour: Alfred Onions

== Footnotes ==
- ^{a} The Total Electorate for the Constituency in December 1910 was also 23,979.
- ^{b} The Total Electorate for the Constituency in January 1910 was 23,979.

== See also ==
- A map of Glamorganshire in 1885, showing its new divisions.
- Boundary Commission Map Report from 1885 showing detailed original maps used
- The National Library for Wales:Dictionary of Welsh Biography (Sir Alfred Thomas)

== Sources ==
=== Books and Journals ===
- Morgan, Kenneth O. (1960). "Democratic Politics in Glamorgan, 1884-1914". Morgannwg. 4: 5–27.
- Morgan, Kenneth O (1991). Wales in British Politics 1868–1922 (3rd ed.). Cardiff: University of Wales Press. ISBN 0708311245.
