= Chorley (constituency) =

Parliamentary constituency in the United Kingdom, 1885 onwards

Coordinates: 53.653°N 2.632°W

- County constituency for the House of Commons
- Interactive map of boundaries since 2024
- Location within North West England
- County: Lancashire
- Population: 94,932 (2011 census)
- Electorate: 74,568 (March 2020)
- Major settlements: Chorley

Current constituency
- Created: 1885
- Member of Parliament: Sir Lindsay Hoyle (Speaker)
- Seats: One
- Created from: North Lancashire

Chorley is a constituency (Note: A county constituency. (for the purposes of election expenses and type of returning officer)) (Note: As with all constituencies, the constituency elects one Member of Parliament (MP) by the first past the post system of election at least every five years.) in Lancashire represented in the House of Commons of the UK Parliament since 1997 by Sir Lindsay Hoyle. Hoyle was originally elected for the Labour Party, but in 2019 became the Speaker, making him unaffiliated.

== Constituency profile ==
The Chorley constituency is located in Lancashire and covers most of the Borough of Chorley. It is centred on the town of Chorley, which has a population of around 40,000, and contains the rural areas surrounding the town including part of the upland West Pennine Moors. The constituency also contains the villages of Adlington, Coppull, Euxton, Clayton-le-Woods and Whittle-le-Woods. Chorley has an industrial heritage; coal mining and cotton milling were traditionally important to the town. There is some deprivation in Clayton Brook and parts of Chorley, however the villages north of the town are generally affluent.

On average, residents of the constituency are more religious and have average levels of wealth and education compared to the rest of the country. White people make up 95% of the population. The constituency is represented entirely by Labour Party councillors at the local district council, whilst some Reform UK councillors were elected in parts of the town at the county council. An estimated 57% of voters in the constituency supported leaving the European Union in the 2016 referendum, higher than the nationwide figure of 52%.

== Boundaries ==
=== Historic ===
1885–1918: The Sessional Division of Leyland Hundred, and part of the Sessional Division of Leyland.

1918–1950: The Municipal Borough of Chorley, the Urban Districts of Adlington, Croston, Leyland, and Withnell, the Rural District of Chorley, and in the Rural District of Wigan the civil parishes of Haigh, Parbold, Worthington, and Wrightington.

1950–1955: The Municipal Borough of Chorley, the Urban Districts of Adlington and Leyland, and the Rural District of Chorley.

1955–1983: The Municipal Borough of Chorley, the Urban Districts of Adlington, Leyland and Withnell, and the Rural District of Chorley.

1983–1997: The Borough of Chorley, and the District of West Lancashire wards of Parbold and Wrightington.

1997–2010: The Borough of Chorley.

2010–2024: The Borough of Chorley wards of Adlington and Anderton, Astley and Buckshaw, Brindle and Hoghton, Chisnall, Chorley East, Chorley North East, Chorley North West, Chorley South East, Chorley South West, Clayton-le-Woods and Whittle-le-Woods, Clayton-le-Woods North, Clayton-le-Woods West and Cuerden, Coppull, Euxton North, Euxton South, Heath Charnock and Rivington, Pennine, and Wheelton and Withnell.

Following its review of parliamentary representation in Lancashire leading up to the 2010 general election, the Boundary Commission for England created a new seat of Wyre and Preston North in the central part of the county, which caused "knock-on" effects elsewhere. Chorley constituency was one of the largest in electorate at the start of the review, which was a factor in the alterations to both its own composition and the changes to surrounding constituencies. These changes took away from the seat all the areas to the west of the M6 motorway, namely Croston, Eccleston, Bretherton and Mawdesley; these moved to South Ribble.

=== Current ===
Further to the 2023 review of Westminster constituencies, which came into effect for the 2024 general election, the constituency is composed of the following wards of the Borough of Chorley (as they existed on 1 December 2020):

- Adlington & Anderton; Buckshaw & Whittle; Chorley East; Chorley North & Astley; Chorley North East; Chorley North West; Chorley South East & Heath Charnock; Chorley South West; Clayton East, Brindle & Hoghton; Clayton West & Cuerden; Coppull; Euxton.

Minor changes to bring the electorate within the permitted range and align with revised ward boundaries.

== History ==
From its creation in 1885 until the 1945 general election, Chorley was held by Conservative Party members. In 1945, it was won by Clifford Kenyon of the Labour Party who held it, sometimes with very small majorities, until his retirement in 1970. It then proved to be a bellwether for the next 40 years, changing hands between Labour and the Conservatives; however, this pattern was broken in 2010 when Labour MP Lindsay Hoyle retained the seat against the national trend.

Hoyle has been MP for Chorley since 1997. In November 2019, he was elected as Speaker of the House of Commons following the resignation of John Bercow; Sir Lindsay had been Deputy Speaker of the House of Commons under Bercow since 2010. There is an inconsistently followed convention, which is mostly kept by the major parties, not to oppose the Speaker at elections. In keeping with this, the previously announced Liberal Democrat candidate for the 2019 UK general election, Paul Valentine, subsequently withdrew from the general election once Sir Lindsay was appointed Speaker. However the Green Party candidate, James Melling, stood against the incumbent Speaker.

== Members of Parliament ==
Election	Member	Party
1885	Joseph Feilden	Conservative
1895 by-election	Lord Balcarres	Conservative
1913 by-election	Henry Hibbert	Conservative
1918	Douglas Hacking	Coalition Conservative
1922	Douglas Hacking	Conservative
1945	Clifford Kenyon	Labour
1970	Connie Monks	Conservative
Feb 1974	George Rodgers	Labour
1979	Den Dover	Conservative
1997	Sir Lindsay Hoyle	Labour
2019	Sir Lindsay Hoyle	Speaker

== Elections ==
Chorley Constituency Election Results

=== Elections in the 2020s ===
The Liberal Democrats, the Conservatives, and Labour traditionally do not stand against the sitting Speaker of the House of Commons. Reform UK originally listed Simon Evans as their candidate before instead listing him as their candidate for West Lancashire.

General election 2024: Chorley
Party	Candidate	Votes	%	±%
Speaker	Lindsay Hoyle	25,238	74.3	+7.0
Green	Mark Tebbutt	4,663	13.7	+4.7
Democracy for Chorley	Ben Holden-Crowther	2,424	7.1	N/A
English Constitution Party	Graham Moore	1,007	3.0	N/A
TUSC	Martin Powell-Davies	632	1.9	N/A
Majority		20,575	60.6	
Turnout		33,964	45.4	−8.1
Speaker hold		Swing		

=== Elections in the 2010s ===
The Liberal Democrats, the Conservatives, and Labour traditionally do not stand against the sitting Speaker of the House of Commons, and consequently did not oppose Lindsay Hoyle's re-election bid. The Brexit Party did not stand an official candidate, however their former candidate stood as an independent, having changed his name via deed poll to Mark Brexit-Smith. The Green Party does not follow the convention of standing aside for the Speaker, and also fielded a candidate in the election.

General election 2019: Chorley
Party	Candidate	Votes	%	±%
Speaker	Lindsay Hoyle	26,831	67.3	+12.0
Independent	Mark Brexit-Smith	9,439	23.7	N/A
Green	James Melling	3,601	9.0	+8.0
Majority		17,392	43.6	+30.1
Turnout		39,870	51.0	−21.7
Speaker gain from Labour		Swing		

General election 2017: Chorley
Party	Candidate	Votes	%	±%
Labour	Lindsay Hoyle	30,745	55.3	+10.2
Conservative	Caroline Moon	23,233	41.8	+5.5
Liberal Democrats	Stephen Fenn	1,126	2.0	−0.6
Green	Peter Lageard	530	1.0	−1.1
Majority		7,512	13.5	+4.7
Turnout		55,634	72.7	+3.5
Labour hold		Swing	+2.4	

General election 2015: Chorley
Party	Candidate	Votes	%	±%
Labour	Lindsay Hoyle	23,322	45.1	+1.9
Conservative	Robert Loughenbury	18,792	36.3	−1.7
UKIP	Mark Smith	6,995	13.5	+9.4
Liberal Democrats	Stephen Fenn	1,354	2.6	−11.4
Green	Alistair Straw	1,111	2.1	N/A
Independent	Adrian Maudsley	138	0.3	N/A
Majority		4,530	8.8	+3.6
Turnout		51,712	69.2	−1.0
Labour hold		Swing	+1.4	

General election 2010: Chorley
Party	Candidate	Votes	%
Labour	Lindsay Hoyle	21,515	43.2
Conservative	Alan Cullens	18,922	38.0
Liberal Democrats	Stephen Fenn	6,957	14.0
UKIP	Nick Hogan	2,021	4.1
Independent	Christopher Curtis	359	1.2
Majority		2,593	5.2
Turnout		49,774	70.2
Labour win (new boundaries)			

=== Elections in the 2000s ===
General election 2005: Chorley
Party	Candidate	Votes	%	±%
Labour	Lindsay Hoyle	25,131	50.7	−1.6
Conservative	Simon Mallett	17,506	35.3	+0.6
Liberal Democrats	Alexander Wilson-Fletcher	6,932	14.0	+2.8
Majority		7,625	15.4	−2.2
Turnout		49,569	62.9	+0.7
Labour hold		Swing	+1.1	

General election 2001: Chorley
Party	Candidate	Votes	%	±%
Labour	Lindsay Hoyle	25,088	52.3	−0.7
Conservative	Peter Booth	16,644	34.7	−1.2
Liberal Democrats	Stephen Fenn	5,372	11.2	+2.7
UKIP	John Frost	848	1.8	N/A
Majority		8,444	17.6	+0.5
Turnout		47,952	62.2	−15.1
Labour hold		Swing	+0.3	

=== Elections in the 1990s ===
General election 1997: Chorley
Party	Candidate	Votes	%
Labour	Lindsay Hoyle	30,607	53.0
Conservative	Den Dover	20,737	35.9
Liberal Democrats	Simon Jones	4,900	8.5
Referendum	Anthony Heaton	1,319	2.3
Natural Law	Peter Leadbetter	143	0.2
Majority		9,870	17.1
Turnout		57,706	77.3
Labour win (new boundaries)			

General election 1992: Chorley
Party	Candidate	Votes	%	±%
Conservative	Den Dover	30,715	47.2	−0.8
Labour	Raymond McManus	26,469	40.7	+6.0
Liberal Democrats	Janet Ross-Mills	7,452	11.5	−4.6
Natural Law	Peter Leadbetter	402	0.6	N/A
Majority		4,246	6.5	−6.8
Turnout		65,038	82.8	+5.9
Conservative hold		Swing	+3.4	

=== Elections in the 1980s ===
General election 1987: Chorley
Party	Candidate	Votes	%	±%
Conservative	Den Dover	29,015	48.0	−0.3
Labour	Anthony Watmough	20,958	34.7	+4.2
Liberal	Ian Simpson	9,706	16.1	−4.2
Green	Anthony Holgate	714	1.2	+0.4
Majority		8,057	13.3	−4.5
Turnout		60,393	76.9	−2.3
Conservative hold		Swing	−2.2	

General election 1983: Chorley
Party	Candidate	Votes	%
Conservative	Den Dover	27,861	48.3
Labour	Ivan Taylor	17,586	30.5
SDP	Peter O'Neill	11,691	20.2
Ecology	Anthony Holgate	451	0.8
Independent	Eva Rokas	114	0.2
Majority		10,275	17.8
Turnout		57,703	79.2
Conservative win (new boundaries)			

=== Elections in the 1970s ===
General election 1979: Chorley
Party	Candidate	Votes	%	±%
Conservative	Den Dover	31,125	46.8	+7.1
Labour	George Rodgers	28,546	43.0	−1.1
Liberal	Neva Orrell	6,388	9.6	−6.3
National Front	Michael John Dean	379	0.6	N/A
Majority		2,579	3.8	N/A
Turnout		66,438	82.0	+0.8
Conservative gain from Labour		Swing	+4.1	

General election October 1974: Chorley
Party	Candidate	Votes	%	±%
Labour	George Rodgers	27,290	44.1	+3.8
Conservative	Barry Porter	24,577	39.7	±0.0
Liberal	Neva Orrell	9,831	15.9	−4.1
More Prosperous Britain	Harold Smith	185	0.3	N/A
Majority		2,713	4.4	+3.8
Turnout		61,883	81.2	+2.5
Labour hold		Swing	+1.9	

General election February 1974: Chorley
Party	Candidate	Votes	%	±%
Labour	George Rodgers	25,440	40.3	−4.0
Conservative	Constance Monks	25,035	39.7	−7.5
Liberal	Neva Orrell	12,652	20.0	+12.1
Majority		405	0.6	N/A
Turnout		63,127	83.7	+4.9
Labour gain from Conservative		Swing	+1.8	

General election 1970: Chorley
Party	Candidate	Votes	%	±%
Conservative	Constance Monks	26,577	47.2	+2.0
Labour	Derek Forwood	24,900	44.3	−10.5
Liberal	Gordon Payne	4,428	7.9	N/A
Anti-Party	Barry Elder	334	0.6	N/A
Majority		1,677	2.9	N/A
Turnout		56,239	78.8	−2.3
Conservative gain from Labour		Swing	+6.3	

=== Elections in the 1960s ===
General election 1966: Chorley
Party	Candidate	Votes	%	±%
Labour	Clifford Kenyon	27,319	54.8	+6.4
Conservative	Constance Monks	22,575	45.2	+4.1
Majority		4,744	9.5	+2.2
Turnout		49,894	81.1	−3.5
Labour hold		Swing	+1.2	

General election 1964: Chorley
Party	Candidate	Votes	%	±%
Labour	Clifford Kenyon	24,710	48.4	−2.3
Conservative	John Sutcliffe	20,997	41.1	−8.2
Liberal	Alistair Bell	5,331	10.5	N/A
Majority		3,713	7.3	+5.9
Turnout		51,038	84.6	−1.1
Labour hold		Swing	+3.0	

=== Elections in the 1950s ===
General election 1959: Chorley
Party	Candidate	Votes	%	±%
Labour	Clifford Kenyon	25,641	50.7	−0.7
Conservative	Frank Taylor	24,965	49.3	+0.7
Majority		676	1.4	−1.4
Turnout		50,606	85.7	+1.4
Labour hold		Swing	+0.7	

General election 1955: Chorley
Party	Candidate	Votes	%	±%
Labour	Clifford Kenyon	24,994	51.4	+0.8
Conservative	Alfred Hall-Davis	23,656	48.6	−0.8
Majority		1,338	2.8	+1.6
Turnout		48,650	84.3	−3.8
Labour hold		Swing	+0.8	

General election 1951: Chorley
Party	Candidate	Votes	%	±%
Labour	Clifford Kenyon	24,771	50.6	+3.0
Conservative	Alfred Hall-Davis	24,118	49.4	+2.5
Majority		583	1.2	+0.5
Turnout		48,889	88.1	−0.3
Labour hold		Swing	+0.3	

General election 1950: Chorley
Party	Candidate	Votes	%
Labour	Clifford Kenyon	23,233	47.6
Conservative	Andrew Fountaine	22,872	46.9
Liberal	Florence Emilie Adams	2,706	5.5
Majority		361	0.7
Turnout		46,105	88.4
Labour win (new boundaries)			

=== Elections in the 1940s ===
General election 1945: Chorley
Party	Candidate	Votes	%	±%
Labour	Clifford Kenyon	24,550	53.2	+11.8
Conservative	Robert Hamilton Brown	21,595	46.8	−8.5
Majority		2,955	6.4	N/A
Turnout		46,145	76.2	2.2
Labour gain from Conservative		Swing	+10.2	

=== Elections in the 1930s ===
General election 1935: Chorley
Party	Candidate	Votes	%	±%
Conservative	Douglas Hacking	23,061	55.3	−14.0
Labour	Arthur Whiting	17,286	41.4	+10.7
Ind. Labour Party	Bob Edwards	1,365	3.3	N/A
Majority		5,775	13.9	−24.7
Turnout		41,712	78.4	−1.7
Conservative hold		Swing	−12.4	

General election 1931: Chorley
Party	Candidate	Votes	%	±%
Conservative	Douglas Hacking	28,749	69.3	+23.7
Labour	John Barrow	12,734	30.7	−11.7
Majority		16,015	38.6	+35.4
Turnout		41,483	80.1	
Conservative hold		Swing	+17.7	

=== Elections in the 1920s ===
General election 1929: Chorley
Party	Candidate	Votes	%	±%
Unionist	Douglas Hacking	19,728	45.6	−12.1
Labour	William Taylor	18,369	42.4	+0.1
Liberal	Hugh Emlyn-Jones	5,207	12.0	N/A
Majority		1,359	3.2	−12.2
Turnout		43,304		
Unionist hold		Swing		

General election 1924: Chorley
Party	Candidate	Votes	%	±%
Unionist	Douglas Hacking	17,844	57.7	+3.0
Labour	Zeph Hutchinson	13,074	42.3	−3.0
Majority		4,770	15.4	+6.0
Turnout		30,918		
Unionist hold		Swing	+3.0	

General election 1923: Chorley
Party	Candidate	Votes	%	±%
Unionist	Douglas Hacking	14,715	54.7	N/A
Labour	Zeph Hutchinson	12,179	45.3	N/A
Majority		2,536	9.4	N/A
Turnout		26,894	74.4	N/A
Unionist hold		Swing	N/A	

General election 1922: Chorley
Party	Candidate	Votes	%	±%
Unionist	Douglas Hacking	Unopposed		
Unionist hold				

=== Elections in the 1910s ===
General election 1918: Chorley
Party		Candidate	Votes	%
C	Unionist	Douglas Hacking	13,059	67.7
	Labour	Elijah Sandham	6,222	32.3
Majority			6,837	35.4
Turnout			19,896	54.5
	Unionist win (new boundaries)			

General Election 1914–15: Another General Election was required to take place before the end of 1915. The political parties had been making preparations for an election to take place and by July 1914, the following candidates had been selected;

- Unionist: Henry Hibbert
- Liberal: John Peter Todd Jackson

By-election 1913: Chorley
Party	Candidate	Votes	%	±%
Unionist	Henry Hibbert	7,573	57.5	−2.8
Liberal	John Peter Todd Jackson	5,606	42.5	+2.8
Majority		1,967	15.0	−5.6
Turnout		13,179	87.1	+1.3
Unionist hold		Swing	−2.8	

General election December 1910: Chorley
Party	Candidate	Votes	%	±%
Conservative	David Lindsay	7,423	60.3	+2.0
Liberal	John Peter Todd Jackson	4,887	39.7	−2.0
Majority		2,536	20.6	+4.0
Turnout		12,310	85.8	−6.6
Conservative hold		Swing	+2.0	

General election January 1910: Chorley
Party	Candidate	Votes	%	±%
Conservative	David Lindsay	7,735	58.3	+2.6
Liberal	Lyon Blease	5,523	41.7	−2.6
Majority		2,212	16.6	+5.2
Turnout		13,258	92.4	+0.2
Conservative hold		Swing		

=== Elections in the 1900s ===
General election 1906: Chorley
Party	Candidate	Votes	%	±%
Conservative	David Lindsay	6,803	55.7	N/A
Liberal	Eliot Crawshay-Williams	5,416	44.3	N/A
Majority		1,387	11.4	N/A
Turnout		12,219	92.2	N/A
Registered electors		13,247		
Conservative hold		Swing	N/A	

By-election 1903: Chorley
Party	Candidate	Votes	%	±%
Conservative	David Lindsay	6,226	56.5	N/A
Liberal	James Lawrence	4,798	43.5	N/A
Majority		1,428	13.0	N/A
Turnout		11,024	85.9	N/A
Registered electors		12,836		
Conservative hold		Swing	N/A	

General election 1900: Chorley
Party	Candidate	Votes	%	±%
Conservative	David Lindsay	Unopposed		
Conservative hold				

=== Elections in the 1890s ===
General election 1895: Chorley
Party	Candidate	Votes	%	±%
Conservative	David Lindsay	Unopposed		
Conservative hold				

1895 Chorley by-election
Party	Candidate	Votes	%	±%
Conservative	David Lindsay	Unopposed		
Conservative hold				

General election 1892: Chorley
Party	Candidate	Votes	%	±%
Conservative	Joseph Feilden	Unopposed		
Conservative hold				

=== Elections in the 1880s ===
General election 1886: Chorley
Party	Candidate	Votes	%	±%
Conservative	Joseph Feilden	Unopposed		
Conservative hold				

General election 1885: Chorley
Party	Candidate	Votes	%
Conservative	Joseph Feilden	5,867	67.6
Liberal	Harold Wright	2,808	32.4
Majority		3,059	35.2
Turnout		8,675	87.8
Conservative win (new seat)			

== See also ==
- Parliamentary constituencies in Lancashire

== Sources ==
- UK General Elections since 1832 (Keele University)

Parliament of the United Kingdom
Preceded by Buckingham	Constituency represented by the speaker 2019–present	Incumbent
