= Baron Hacking =

Barony in the Peerage of the United Kingdom

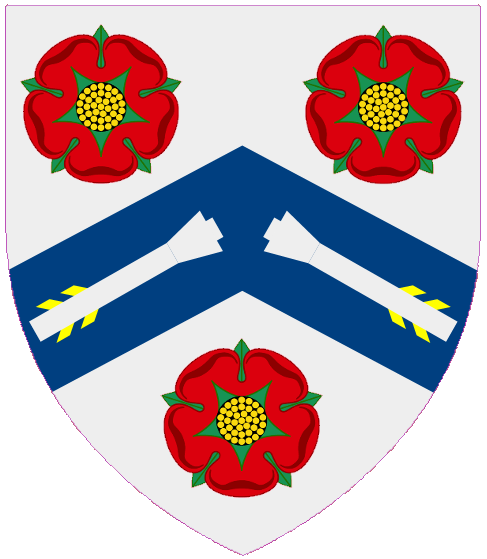
- Crest: In front of an oak tree eradicated two axes in saltire all Proper.
- Shield: Argent on a chevron Azure between three roses Gules barbed and seeded Proper two bird bolts of the field feathered Or.
- Supporters: On either side a griffin Gules on the shoulder an escutcheon Argent charged with a blue-bottle (cyanus) stalked and leaved Proper.
- Motto: Dominus Providebit

Baron Hacking, of Chorley in the County Palatine of Lancaster, is a title in the Peerage of the United Kingdom. It was created in 1945 for the Conservative politician Sir Douglas Hacking, 1st Baronet. He was Chairman of the Conservative Party from 1936 to 1942. Hacking had already been created a baronet in 1938. As of 2011 the titles are held by his grandson, the third Baron, who succeeded his father in 1971.

== Barons Hacking (1945) ==
- Douglas Hewitt Hacking, 1st Baron Hacking (1884–1950)
- Douglas Eric Hacking, 2nd Baron Hacking (1910–1971)
- Douglas David Hacking, 3rd Baron Hacking (b. 1938)

The heir apparent is the present holder's son, Hon. Douglas Francis Hacking (b. 1968).
