= Frederick Leathers, 1st Viscount Leathers =

British industrialist and public servant

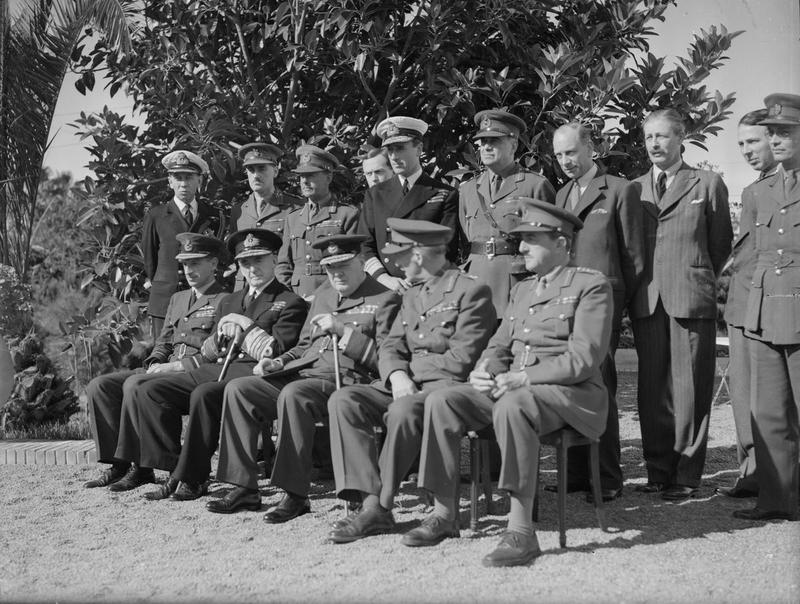
Leathers (2nd row, 4th from right) at the Casablanca Conference in January 1943

Frederick James Leathers, 1st Viscount Leathers, CH, PC (21 November 1883 – 19 March 1965), was a British industrialist and public servant.

Leathers was born at 47, Bromley Street, Stepney ("London's poor East End district"), son of carpenter Robert Leathers, of Stowmarket, Suffolk, and Emily Jane, née Seaman. His father died when he was four months old. He left school in 1898 at the age of 15 to work with Steamship Owners Coal Association (later merged with William Cory & Son), becoming managing director in 1916. He was concerned also with other companies dealing with coal or shipping services. He served in the management of the Pacific and Orient Lines, where he came to the attention of Winston Churchill, from 1931 a director of the firm.

He served as an adviser to the Ministry of Shipping from 1914 to 1918 and 1940 to 1941, and as Minister of War Transport in 1941 for the duration of World War II, on the appointment and strong recommendation of Churchill, who in so doing raised him to the peerage. In fact, Churchill said of him "At these meetings, (of a subsidiary company of the Peninsular and Oriental shipping lines where Churchill was a director in 1930), I gradually became aware of a very remarkable man. He presided over 30 or 40 companies ... I soon perceived that Frederick Leathers was the central brain and controlling power of this combination. He knew everything and commanded absolute confidence. Year after year I watched him ... I said to myself "If ever there is another war, here is a man who will play the same kind of part as the great business leaders who served under me at the Ministry of Munitions in 1917 and 1918". On 8 May 1941, I turned to him. To give him the necessary authority I created the office of Minister of War Transport". (The Grand Alliance, pub. Cassell, London, p132. 1966)

He attended the Casablanca, Washington, Quebec, and Cairo conferences in 1943. He negotiated the lend-lease of American ships to Britain. He also accompanied the prime minister, Winston Churchill to the Yalta and Potsdam Conferences.

He later served as Minister for Coordination of Transport, Fuel and Power from 1951 to 1953. He was raised to the peerage as Baron Leathers, of Purfleet in the County of Essex, in 1941, and appointed a Member of the Order of the Companions of Honour in 1943. He was further honoured when he was made Viscount Leathers, of Purfleet in the County of Essex, in 1954.

== Arms ==
Coat of arms of Frederick Leathers, 1st Viscount Leathers
Crest A lozenge Sable in front of two anchors in saltire Or. Escutcheon Azure a lymphad sails set Or flags flying to the dexter Gules on a chief of the second three lozenges Sable. Supporters Dexter a sea-lion sinister a sea horse Argent gorged with a collar of lozenges conjoined Sable. Motto Dum Spiro Servo (While I Breathe I Serve)

Political offices
Preceded by John Moore-Brabazon as Minister of Transport	Minister of War Transport; 1941–1945	Succeeded by Alfred Barnes as Minister of Transport
New title	Minister for Coordination of Transport, Fuel and Power; 1951–1953	Office abolished
Peerage of the United Kingdom
New creation	Viscount Leathers; 1954–1965	Succeeded by Frederick Leathers
New creation	Baron Leathers; 1941–1965	Succeeded by Frederick Leathers
