= East Ham South =

Parliamentary constituency in the United Kingdom, 1918–1974

- Former borough constituency for the House of Commons
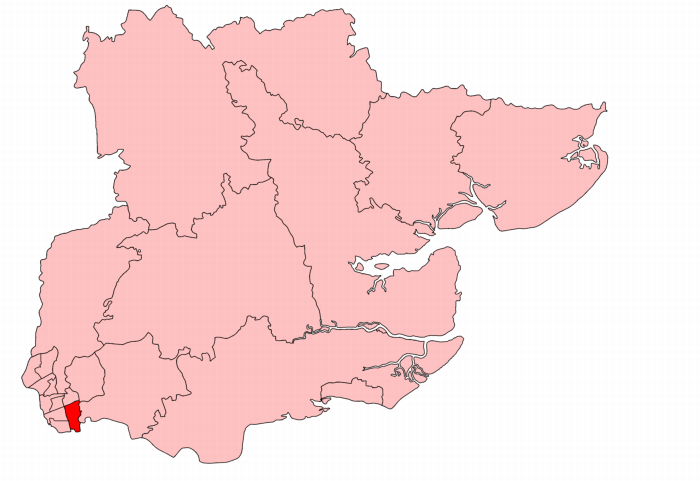
- East Ham South within Essex from 1918 to 1950. East Ham South within Essex from 1918 to 1950
- County: 1918–1965: Essex; 1965–1974: Greater London

1918–1974
- Seats: One
- Created from: Romford
- Replaced by: Newham North East and Newham South

East Ham South was a parliamentary constituency centred on the East Ham district of London, which was in Essex until 1965. It returned one Member of Parliament (MP) to the House of Commons of the Parliament of the United Kingdom, elected by the first past the post voting system.

== History ==
The constituency was created by the Representation of the People Act 1918 for the 1918 general election. It was abolished for the February 1974 general election.

== Boundaries ==
The seat was established in 1918, as a division of the County Borough of East Ham in the south western part of the historic county of Essex. It comprised the Beckton and North Woolwich, Central East and Central West wards.

By the time of the next major redistribution of parliamentary seats, which took effect in 1950, East Ham had been re-warded. The constituency then comprised Castle, Central, Greatfield, South and Wall End wards.

In 1965 East Ham was joined with other districts to form the London Borough of Newham in Greater London. It is part of east London.

In the 1974 redistribution the constituency was abolished and its area included in the new Newham North East seat.

== Members of Parliament ==
Election	Member	Party
1918	Clement Edwards	Coalition National Democratic
1922	Clement Edwards	National Liberal
1922	Alfred Barnes	Labour
1931	Malcolm Campbell-Johnston	Conservative
1935	Alfred Barnes	Labour Co-operative
1955	Albert Oram	Labour Co-operative
Feb 1974	constituency abolished	

== Elections ==
=== Elections in the 1910 ===
Clement Edwards

General election 1918: East Ham South
Party		Candidate	Votes	%
C	National Democratic	Clement Edwards	7,972	42.8
	Unionist	Robert Frederick Frank Hamlett	5,661	30.3
	Labour	Arthur Henderson	5,024	26.9
Majority			2,311	12.5
Turnout			18,657	57.5
	National Democratic win (new seat)			
C indicates candidate endorsed by the coalition government.

=== Elections in the 1920s ===
Smallwood

General election 1922: East Ham South
Party	Candidate	Votes	%	±%
Labour Co-op	Alfred Barnes	10,566	48.1	+21.2
Liberal	Edward Smallwood	6,567	30.0	New
National Liberal	Clement Edwards	4,793	21.9	−20.9
Majority		3,999	18.1	N/A
Turnout		21,926	66.3	+8.8
Registered electors		33,070		
Labour Co-op gain from National Liberal		Swing	+21.1	

General election 1923: East Ham South
Party	Candidate	Votes	%	±%
Labour Co-op	Alfred Barnes	11,402	49.2	+1.1
Liberal	Edward Smallwood	8,772	37.8	+7.8
Unionist	Herbert Joseph Ward	3,011	13.0	New
Majority		2,630	11.4	−6.7
Turnout		23,185	68.5	+2.2
Registered electors		33,837		
Labour Co-op hold		Swing	−3.4	

General election 1924: East Ham South
Party	Candidate	Votes	%	±%
Labour Co-op	Alfred Barnes	13,644	51.9	+2.7
Liberal	Edward Maynard Coningsby Denney	12,656	48.1	+10.3
Majority		988	3.8	−7.6
Turnout		26,300	75.9	+7.4
Registered electors		34,651		
Labour Co-op hold		Swing	−3.8	

General election 1929: East Ham South
Party	Candidate	Votes	%	±%
Labour Co-op	Alfred Barnes	18,956	54.3	+2.4
Unionist	Hubert Duggan	8,854	25.4	New
Liberal	Edward Maynard Coningsby Denney	7,085	20.3	−27.8
Majority		10,102	28.9	+25.1
Turnout		34,895	73.8	−2.1
Registered electors		47,261		
Labour Co-op hold		Swing	+15.1	

=== Elections in the 1930s ===
General election 1931: East Ham South Electorate 48,431
Party	Candidate	Votes	%	±%
Conservative	Malcolm Campbell-Johnston	18,300	53.8	+28.4
Labour Co-op	Alfred Barnes	15,737	46.2	−8.1
Majority		2,563	7.6	N/A
Turnout		34,037	70.3	−3.5
Conservative gain from Labour Co-op		Swing	+18.2	

General election 1935: East Ham South Electorate 47,950
Party	Candidate	Votes	%	±%
Labour Co-op	Alfred Barnes	18,949	59.3	+13.1
Conservative	Malcolm Campbell-Johnston	12,993	40.7	−13.1
Majority		5,956	18.6	New
Turnout		31,942	66.6	−3.7
Labour Co-op gain from Conservative		Swing	+13.1	

=== Elections in the 1940s ===
General election 1945: East Ham South Electorate 37,037
Party	Candidate	Votes	%	±%
Labour Co-op	Alfred Barnes	19,168	74.0	+14.7
Conservative	MG Munthe	6,734	26.0	−14.7
Majority		12,434	48.0	+29.4
Turnout		25,902	69.9	+3.3
Labour Co-op hold		Swing	+14.7	

=== Elections in the 1950s ===
General election 1950: East Ham South
Party	Candidate	Votes	%	±%
Labour Co-op	Alfred Barnes	23,002	62.1	−11.9
Conservative	C. E. Jordan	10,956	29.6	+3.6
Liberal	Cecil Arthur Borrott	2,424	6.5	New
Communist	E. C. W. Thomas	401	1.1	New
Socialist (GB)	Harry Young	256	0.7	New
Majority		12,046	32.5	−15.5
Turnout		37,039	84.4	+14.5
Labour Co-op hold		Swing		

General election 1951: East Ham South
Party	Candidate	Votes	%	±%
Labour Co-op	Alfred Barnes	23,704	64.9	+2.8
Conservative	John Barter	12,813	35.1	+5.5
Majority		10,891	29.8	−2.7
Turnout		36,517	82.5	−1.9
Labour Co-op hold		Swing		

General election 1955: East Ham South
Party	Candidate	Votes	%	±%
Labour Co-op	Albert Oram	19,808	64.1	−0.8
Conservative	Anthony J Pickford	11,109	35.9	+0.8
Majority		8,699	28.2	−1.6
Turnout		30,917	73.1	−9.4
Labour Co-op hold		Swing	-0.8	

General election 1959: East Ham South
Party	Candidate	Votes	%	±%
Labour Co-op	Albert Oram	18,230	61.5	−2.6
Conservative	Reginald J Watts	11,422	38.5	+2.6
Majority		6,808	23.0	−5.2
Turnout		29,652	74.6	+1.5
Labour Co-op hold		Swing		

=== Elections in the 1960s ===
General election 1964: East Ham South
Party	Candidate	Votes	%	±%
Labour Co-op	Albert Oram	17,069	66.0	+4.5
Conservative	Reginald J Watts	8,797	34.0	−4.5
Majority		8,272	32.0	+9.0
Turnout		25,866	67.9	−6.7
Labour Co-op hold		Swing		

General election 1966: East Ham South
Party	Candidate	Votes	%	±%
Labour Co-op	Albert Oram	17,543	69.9	+3.9
Conservative	Ivor Stanbrook	7,540	30.1	−3.9
Majority		10,003	39.8	+7.8
Turnout		25,083	65.7	−2.2
Labour Co-op hold		Swing	+3.9	

=== Elections in the 1970s ===
General election 1970: East Ham South
Party	Candidate	Votes	%	±%
Labour Co-op	Albert Oram	13,638	61.9	−8.0
Conservative	Christopher Jackson	8,402	38.1	+8.0
Majority		5,236	23.8	−16.0
Turnout		22,040	55.1	−10.6
Labour Co-op hold		Swing	-8.0	
