= Malcolm Campbell-Johnston =

British barrister and politician

Lieutenant Colonel Malcolm Campbell-Johnston

Member of Parliament for East Ham South
- In office 1931–1935
- Preceded by: Alfred Barnes
- Succeeded by: Alfred Barnes

Personal details
- Born: 14 April 1871
- Died: 12 March 1938 (aged 66)
- Party: Conservative
- Spouse: May Isabel Fisk (m. 1922)
- Occupation: Barrister

Military service
- Allegiance: United Kingdom
- Branch/service: British Army
- Years of service: 1914-1918
- Rank: Lieutenant Colonel
- Unit: York and Lancaster Regiment

Malcolm Campbell-Johnston (14 April 1871 – 12 March 1938) was a British barrister and Conservative Party politician.

== Early life ==
Born in Crowthorne, Berkshire, he was the son of Alexander Robert Campbell-Johnston and Frances Ellen Bury Campbell-Johnston (née Paliser). He was educated at Marlborough College and then studied law in California. He returned to the United Kingdom where he was called to bar at the Inner Temple in 1893. He subsequently travelled to South Africa where he was admitted as a barrister in 1902. He returned to the United Kingdom in 1906.

== Career ==
Campbell-Johnston became involved in Unionist politics, and stood unsuccessfully for parliament in the December 1910 general election as the Conservative candidate at Osgoldcross in the West Riding of Yorkshire.

With the outbreak of the First World War, Campbell-Johnston obtained a commission in the 8th Battalion, York and Lancaster Regiment. In 1915 he was transferred to the General Staff as an Assistant Provost Marshal. He later transferred to the Royal Sussex Regiment and served on the Western Front from 1915–1918.

Following the war he attempted to gain election to the London County Council in 1919, standing as a member of the Conservative-backed Municipal Reform Party at Bow and Bromley without success. Three years later he gained a place on the council, representing Balham and Tooting. In the same year he married May Isabel Fisk, a New York author.

In 1931 a National Government was formed, and in October of that year a general election was held. Campbell-Johnston was chosen by the Conservatives to attempt to win the seat of East Ham South from the Labour Party, who opposed the National Government. He successfully unseated Alfred Barnes, the sitting MP. He resigned his London County Council seat at the 1934 local elections.

When the next general election was called in 1935, Campbell-Johnston failed to hold his East Ham seat in a straight fight against Barnes, the man he had defeated four years earlier. In December 1935 he announced that he would not be standing for parliament again.

In 1937 he returned to local government, winning election to the London County Council at Lewisham West.

== Death ==
He died at his home in Marylebone, London in March 1938, aged 66. He was cremated at Golders Green Crematorium.

Parliament of the United Kingdom
Preceded by Alfred Barnes	Member of Parliament for East Ham South; 1931–1935	Succeeded by Alfred Barnes
