= Constance Monks =

British politician and teacher

Constance Monks OBE JP

Member of Parliament for Chorley
- In office 18 June 1970 – 8 February 1974
- Preceded by: Clifford Kenyon
- Succeeded by: George Rodgers

Personal details
- Born: Constance Mary Green; 20 May 1911
- Died: 4 February 1989 (aged 77)
- Party: Conservative

Constance Mary Monks (20 May 1911 – 4 February 1989) OBE, JP, née Green, was a British Conservative Party politician and teacher. She was also a partner with her husband in a newspaper business.

== Education ==
She was educated in Leeds, Yorkshire at the Leeds City Teacher Training College.

== Political career ==
She was a councillor on Chorley Municipal Borough Council from 1947 to 1967 during which time she was Mayor from 1959 to 1960. She was also a councillor on Lancashire County Council from 1961 to 1964.

Monks was elected on her second attempt as member of parliament for Chorley constituency in 1970, but lost in February 1974 to the Labour candidate George Rodgers. Monks was the first, and so far the only, female MP for Chorley. She was a justice of the peace (JP) and was awarded the OBE in 1962.

Parliament of the United Kingdom
| Preceded by Clifford Kenyon | Member of Parliament for Chorley; 1970 – February 1974 | Succeeded by George Rodgers |
