= Henry Hibbert =

British politician (1850-1927)

Sir Henry Flemming Hibbert Bt DL
- Portrait by Walter Stoneman, 1919

Member of Parliament for Chorley
- In office 1913–1918
- Preceded by: The Lord Balcarres
- Succeeded by: Douglas Hacking

Personal details
- Born: 4 April 1850
- Died: 15 November 1927 (aged 77)
- Party: Conservative
- Spouse: Marion Theresa Reuss

Sir Henry Flemming Hibbert, 1st Baronet DL (4 April 1850 – 15 November 1927) was a British Conservative politician.

Hibbert was chairman of the Technical Instruction Committee of the Lancashire County Council. He received the freedom and livery of the Plumbers′ Company in December 1902, and was awarded a knighthood in 1903.

He was elected the Member of Parliament for Chorley following the 1913 by-election and served until 1918. He became deputy lieutenant of the County of Lancaster in 1915. In 1919 he was created a baronet, of Chorley in the County of Lancashire, which became extinct on his death.

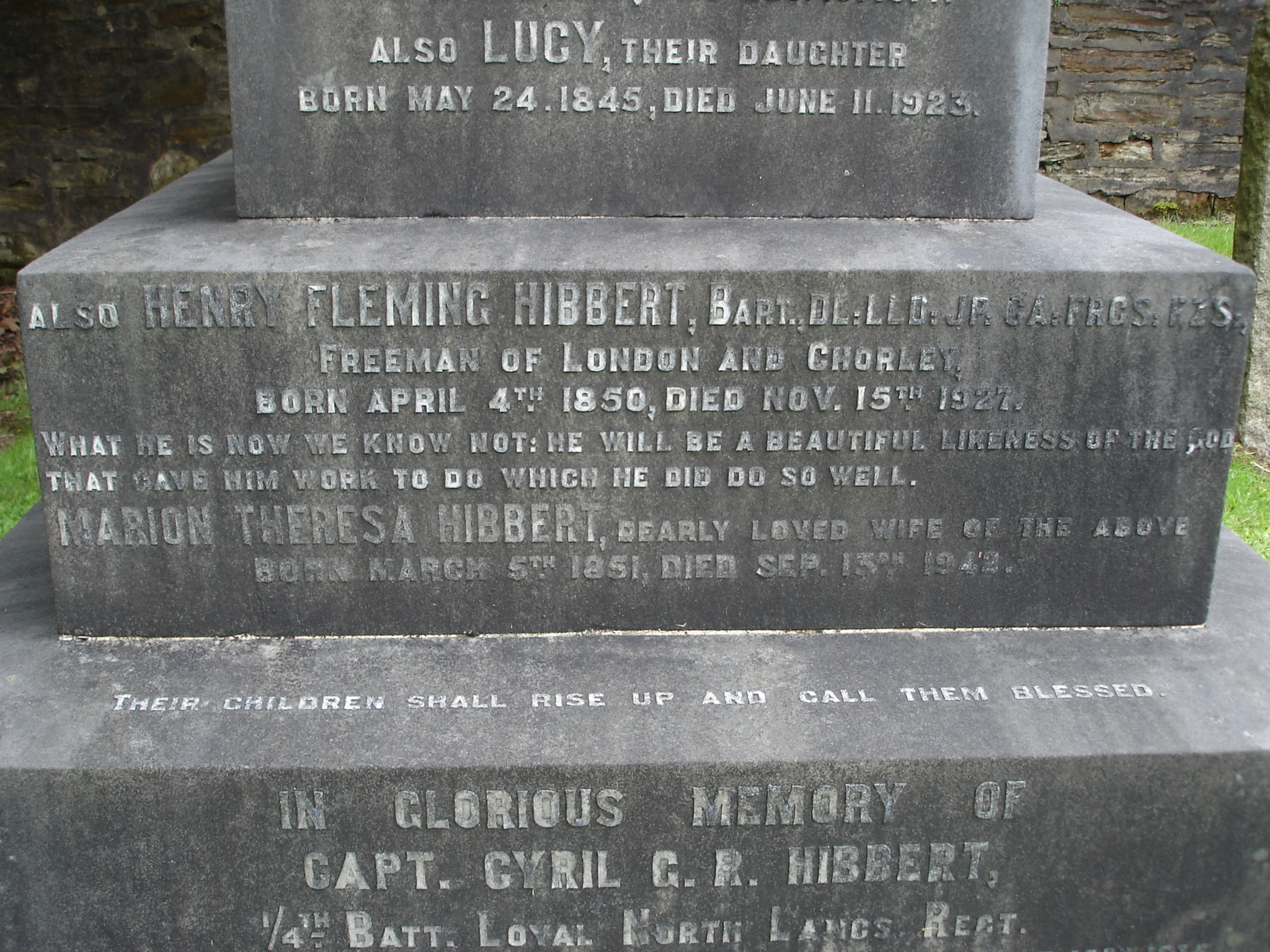
Grave memorial inscription

He died in 1927, aged 77, and was buried in Chorley cemetery.

== Family ==
Hibbert had married Marion Theresa Reuss (5 March 1851 – 13 September 1942). Their son, Cyril, was killed in action during World War I.

Baronetage of the United Kingdom
New creation	Baronet (of Chorley); 1919–1927	Extinct
