= National Institutions (Wales) Bill =

National Institutions (Wales) Bill was introduced into Parliament in 1891 by Alfred Thomas, MP for East Glamorgan. This Bill, supported by T. E. Ellis, proposed the creation of a Welsh Office, a Welsh National University, and a National Museum of Wales as well as a Welsh Parliament, to be based in Aberystwyth. Ellis' role in the process was purely advisory, as he spent much of 1891 in Egypt for the sake of his health (ironic, as Ellis caught a fever there and almost died, an experience that left him weakened for life). The Bill was opposed by Sir Edward James Reed, MP for Cardiff, and David Alfred Thomas, MP for Merthyr Tydfil, who felt that the Bill would lead to rural Wales dominating industrial South Wales. Although the Bill was unsuccessful, it indicated for the first time what a Welsh national party might be able to achieve. Consideration of the Bill, combined with fever led Ellis to issue a Welsh National Manifesto from Luxor, Egypt, proposing such institutions, together with a 'Temple of Nationalism.'

== Sources ==
- National Library of Wales, T. E. Ellis Papers
- Sir Thomas Hughes, Great Welshmen of Modern Days (Cardiff, 1931)
- Neville Masterman, The Forerunner: Dilemmas of Tom Ellis, 1859-1899 (Swansea, 1972)
- David Jenkins, A refuge in Peace and War: The National Library of Wales to 1952 (Aberystwyth, 2002)
- W. Hughes Johns, Wales Drops the Pilots (London, no date)
- K. O. Morgan, D. A. Thomas: The Industrialist as Politician
- Gerard Charmley, 'D. A. Thomas Versus Lloyd George' (Unpublished University of Wales M.A. Thesis)
