= May Isabel Fisk =

American monologist and writer

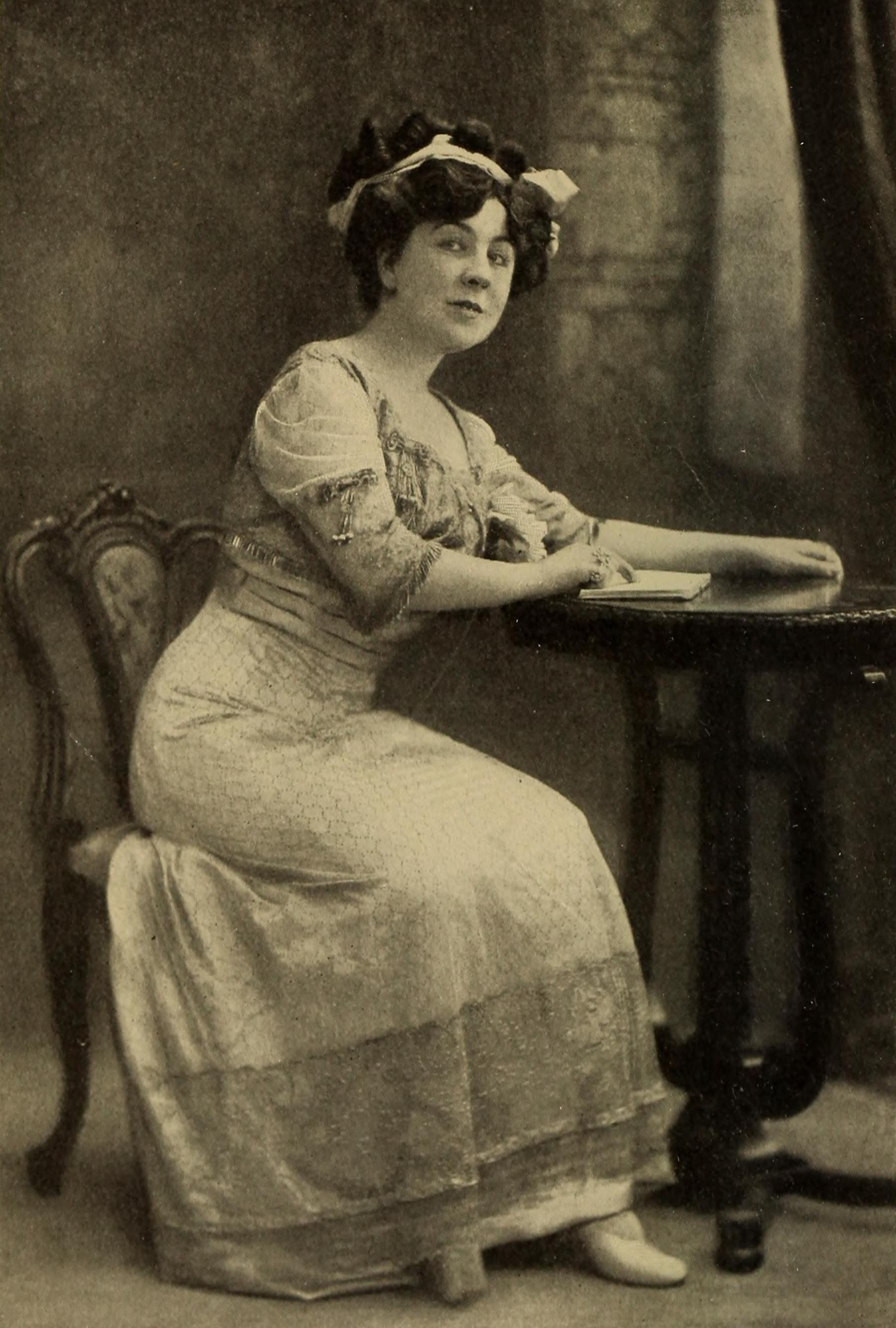
- Fisk c. 1911
- Born: May Isabel Taylor; May 22, 1872; New York City, New York, U.S.
- Died: 1955 (aged 82–83); Paddington, London, U.K.
- Other names: May Isabel Campbell-Johnston
- Occupations: Monologist, writer
- Spouses: Clinton Bowen Fisk (m. 1894; death 1909) Malcolm Campbell-Johnston (m. 1922; death 1938)

May Isabel Fisk (born Taylor, later Campbell-Johnston; May 22, 1872 – 1955) was an American monologist and writer. Known for her humor in her writing as well as performance, she was a contemporary and friend of Mark Twain, who called her "the only woman humorist in America". She lived in Britain for some years circa 1922 but returned to the United States in 1938.

== Early life and education ==
May Isabel Taylor was born on May 22, 1872, (Note: Birth date is stated as May 22, 1885, in a 1976 biographical dictionary of authors and as 1890 in a 1978 publication. However, her marriage record shows she married in 1894. Given that the 1976 birth date would have made her nine years old and the 1978 birth date would have made her four years old, the census date has been used. Note that when she died in 1955 her age was given as 83 which would give a birth year about 1872) in New York City, to Isabelle (Gray) and William Willard Taylor. She attended the Sylvanus Reed school in New York and studied voice with a teacher named Toriani in Paris.

== Career ==
Fisk wrote "six books of comic monologues, two books of fiction, several plays, and numerous short stories". Her monologues generally concerned "society women" who did not treat those around them with respect. She wrote at least 60. Some were written in dialect. In addition to her written work, Fisk also performed on the vaudeville stage.

Critic Maggie B. Gale, comparing Fisk to Beatrice Herford, argues that both adopted an "anthropological perspective" on "social types" of the time. Julia Hans argues that "Fisk expresses women's discontent through a mask of humor at a time when popular writers idealized feminine felicity and passivity".

According to Mark Twain, a friend of hers, Fisk was the "only woman humorist in America". She said she began writing humor because she didn't want to laugh alone. Fisk said, "Women are so funny because they take trivial things so seriously and because they are so unconsciously humorous".

== Personal life ==
May Taylor married Clinton Bowen Fisk on January 27, 1894. Her husband was the son of Clinton B. Fisk, who endowed Fisk University. Clinton Jr. worked as a newspaper editor and theatrical manager until his death in 1909. The couple had one child, Clinton B. Fisk, who later went by the name of Clinton Gray-Fisk, and became a music critic and animal rights activist. After Clinton Jr.'s death, May married Malcolm Campbell-Johnston on August 1, 1922, becoming a British national. (Note: Upon passage of the Expatriation Act of 1907, wives in the US acquired their husband's nationality upon any marriage occurring after March 2, 1907. Though the Cable Act was passed in September 1922, women who had lost their nationality through marrying a foreigner could only repatriate if they applied to be naturalized.)

As of 1922, Fisk lived in London. She came back to the United States in 1938 after the death of her second husband, Malcolm Campbell-Johnston, and settled in California. In 1943, Fisk began working as a real estate developer of lots in Redondo Beach, California. She died in Paddington, London, in 1955.

== Works ==
- A Pair of Bellows (1897)
- Monologues (1903)
- The Talking Woman (1907)
- The Eternal Feminine (1911)
- Monologues and Duologues (1914)
