= Morgan Lindsay =

British Army officer (1857–1935)

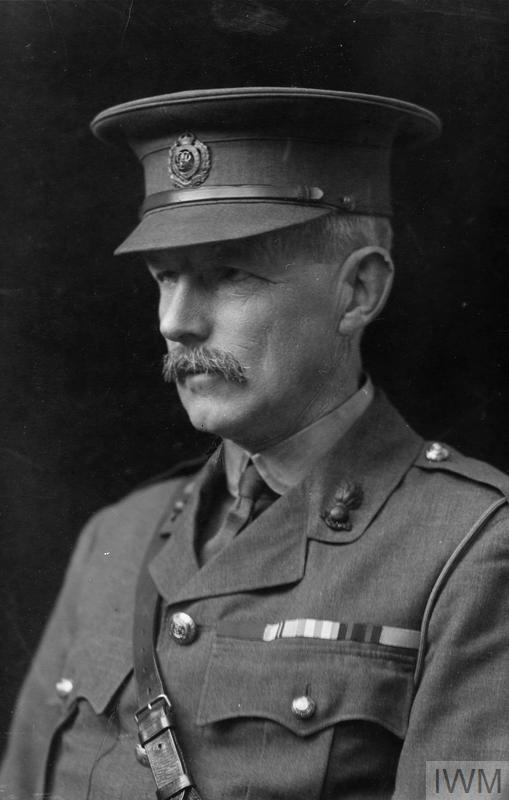
- Morgan Lindsay during the First World War © IWM HU 124166
- Born: 13 February 1857; Tredegar Park, Newport
- Died: 1 November 1935 (aged 78); Ystrad Mynach, Glamorgan
- Burial place: Holy Trinity Church, Ystrad Mynach
- Relatives: George Mackintosh Lindsay (brother)
- Military career
- Allegiance: United Kingdom
- Branch: British Army
- Rank: Lieutenant Colonel
- Unit: Royal Engineers
- Commands: Royal Monmouthshire Royal Engineers
- Conflicts: First Boer War; Mahdist War; Second Boer War
- Awards: Companion of the Order of the Bath

Henry Edzell Morgan Lindsay (13 February 1857 – 1 November 1935) was a British Army officer who served with the Royal Engineers in various campaigns in the 19th and early 20th centuries. He was an amateur sportsman who played for the Royal Engineers football team in the 1878 FA Cup Final. Following his retirement from the Army he became a racehorse trainer with winners in the 1926 and 1928 Welsh Grand Nationals and the 1933 National Hunt Chase at Cheltenham.

== Family and education ==
Lindsay was born at Tredegar Park, near Newport, South Wales on 11 February 1857, the eldest son of Henry Gore Lindsay (1830–1914), an army officer who later became chief constable of Glamorgan, and his wife, Ellen Sarah (1837–1912), the fourth daughter of Charles Morgan Robinson Morgan, MP for Brecon, who was created the first Baron Tredegar in 1859. Major-General George Mackintosh Lindsay (1880–1956), the expert on mechanized warfare, was his youngest brother, while another brother, Lionel Arthur Lindsay (1861–1945) followed his father as chief constable of Glamorgan.

Lindsay was educated at the Royal Academy, Gosport, before joining the Royal Military Academy, Woolwich.

== Football career ==
Lindsay played football while at the Royal Military Academy, Woolwich before joining the Royal Engineers, and was described as "a useful wing player, being fast and not to be removed from the ball". In 1877, he joined the Royal Engineers side which had participated in the FA Cup since its inception in 1871–72, during which period they had reached three finals, winning the trophy in 1875.

In the 1877–78 FA Cup tournament, the Royal Engineers had an easy start, defeating Pilgrims 6–0 in the second round and Welsh side Druids 8–0 in the third round, with Lindsay scoring one of the goals. In the fourth round, they came up against tougher opposition in Oxford University, requiring two replays before the Engineers emerged victorious. The semi-final was a straightforward 2–1 victory over Old Harrovians, setting up a final against the Wanderers, who had won the cup in the two previous seasons. In the final, played at Kennington Oval on 23 March 1878, Lindsay played at inside-right, thus becoming the first Welsh player to appear in an F.A. Cup Final. Although the "Sappers" put up a hard fight, they were unable to prevent the Wanderers winning their third consecutive FA Cup with a final score of 3–1.

Lindsay continued to turn out for the Engineers when his military duties permitted, and is recorded as the scorer of the second Engineers goal in the 6–2 FA Cup fourth round defeat by Old Carthusians on 25 January 1883. In 1880, he played for The South against The North.

== Cricket career ==
In his youth, Lindsay was also a keen amateur cricketer, and played for Glamorgan (then not a first-class county), as well as playing for the MCC, I Zingari and for South Wales CC.

In later life, he had a cricket ground constructed at his home at Ystrad Fawr, near Ystrad Mynach, and established his own boys' cricket team.

== Military career ==
Lindsay was commissioned as a (temporary) lieutenant in the Royal Engineers on 2 August 1876, subsequently made permanent with retrospective effect from 2 February 1876. After five years training in England, in February 1881 Lindsay was sent to South Africa, where the First Boer War was drawing to a conclusion. As a member of No. 1 Section, Field Telegraph, (under the overall command of Brigadier-General Sir Evelyn Wood) he remained in South Africa until September 1882, when he returned to England. On his return to England, he was based at Aldershot, but spent eight weeks at the School of Musketry in Hythe, Kent in October and November 1883. From May 1884 to February 1885, Lindsay joined the newly-formed Postal Telegraph Service.

In February 1885, Lindsay was sent to Sudan for the second Suakin Expedition. He was now in command of the 2nd Section Telegraph Battalion, Royal Engineers under the overall command of Lieutenant-General Sir Gerald Graham. During the campaign, he was present at the Battle of Tofrek on 22 March 1885. From 5 April, he became the Director of Telegraph, and remained in Sudan until early June 1885. For his services in Sudan, he was awarded the Egypt Medal with two clasps, together with the Khedive's Star.

On his return to England in June 1885, he was on sick leave for ten weeks, before re-joining the Postal Telegraph Service, where he remained until 30 September 1886.

On 1 October 1886, Lindsay was attached to the Royal Monmouthshire Engineers (Militia) as adjutant, with the rank of captain. On 2 December 1891, he left the Royal Engineers to serve with the Royal Monmouthshire Royal Engineers, initially retaining the rank of captain, with the honorary rank of major being conferred on 30 December 1891.

In May 1900, Lindsay was placed in command of a company from the Royal Monmouthshire Royal Engineers which was sent for service in South Africa in the Second Boer War. The company left Southampton on 6 June 1900 on board RMS Aurania, arriving at Cape Town on 29 June, from where they travelled by train to the Orange River Colony for duty with the regular Royal Engineers based at Bloemfontein, where they would be engaged on work repairing the roads, railways and bridges for the next 15 months. In late 1900, the company was transferred to the Imperial Military Railways, with Lindsay being appointed Deputy Superintendent of Works and Officer Commanding the Railway Troops in Orange River Colony. In this capacity, he was based at Kroonstad from where he was responsible for the pay, clothing and discipline of the soldiers of all corps employed on the Imperial Military Railways in the Colony, as well as maintaining the railway network. The company were recalled to England in September 1901, and were disembodied on 14 October 1901.

In the meantime, on 20 March 1901, Lindsay's rank as major was made permanent, with the honorary rank of lieutenant-colonel being awarded on 27 April 1901. For his services in the Boer War, Lindsay was mentioned in despatches and awarded the Queen's South Africa Medal with three clasps. He also received the substantive rank of major in the Army Reserve of officers.

Having been promoted to Commanding Officer of the Royal Monmouthshire Royal Engineers, Lindsay was appointed a Companion of the Order of the Bath (CB), Civil Division in the 1911 Coronation Honours. Lindsay remained in command of the regiment at the start of World War One, based at the depot in Monmouth, although he did visit the Western Front briefly in January 1917, before relinquishing his commission in favour of Lt.-Col. Roland Forestier-Walker on 24 May 1917.

== Racehorse trainer ==
From his home at Ystrad Mynach, Lindsay started to train horses for point-to-point races. Among his early successes was the March 1890 point-to-point held by the Glamorgan Hunt at Crossways, near Cowbridge in the Vale of Glamorgan, where his horse Brunette came in the winner.

By 1906, he had turned to training steeplechasers, with his horse Creolin winning the 1906 Scottish Grand National.

His clients included Sir David Llewellyn, 1st Baronet, whose son Harry schooled horses for Lindsay at his training establishment at Ystrad Mynach, as did other successful Welsh jockeys, Fulke Walwyn and Evan Williams.

In 1926, Lindsay trained Miss Balscadden to win the Welsh Grand National, with the same horse winning two years later. In 1929, Miss Balscadden was entered for the Grand National, but failed to finish.

Lindsay's last known success was at Cheltenham in March 1933, when his horse Ego won the National Hunt Steeplechase.

== Public service and politics ==
Lindsay was a member of Glamorgan County Council from 1892 to 1901, and for Caerphilly District Council from 1892. He was a Justice of the Peace for both Glamorganshire and for County Dublin in Ireland (where the family had a home at Glasnevin). As a J.P., Lindsay was the senior magistrate for the Caerphilly Petty Sessional Division. He was also a deputy lieutenant for Glamorganshire.

He was also very involved in the administration of sport in South Wales, becoming President of both the South Wales Football Association from 1890 to 1922, and the Glamorgan Cricket League. He was also a member of the committee of Glamorgan CCC and assisted with their fund-raising as they moved from Minor County status to becoming a first-class club.

Although on active service in South Africa, in October 1900 Lindsay stood for Parliament in the East Glamorganshire constituency at the general election to represent the Conservative Party. Despite a spirited campaign by his wife, Lindsay failed to secure the seat, losing to the sitting member Alfred Thomas, (later Lord Pontypridd) (Liberal) by 6,994 votes to 4,080.

Lindsay was again selected as the Conservative Party candidate for the 1915 General Election for East Glamorganshire, but this election was not proceeded with following the outbreak of the First World War.

In 1919, Lindsay was the designer of the war memorial at Sutton Courtenay near Abingdon, then in Berkshire, close to the home of his cousin, the garden designer Norah Lindsay.

== Marriage and children ==
Lindsay married Ellen Katherine Thomas, daughter of George William Griffiths Thomas, a wealthy landowner, on 24 July 1889 at Pontypridd, Glamorganshire.

The couple had six children:

- George Walter Thomas Lindsay, born 29 January 1891
- Claud Frederic Thomas Lindsay, born 20 January 1892
- Ellen Blanche Lindsay, born 22 December 1893
- Archibald Thurston Thomas Lindsay, born 17 June 1897
- Nesta Jessie Lindsay, born 23 May 1898
- David Edzell Thomas Lindsay, born 28 February 1910, died 14 July 1968.

Lindsay's three eldest sons were all killed in the First World War. George served initially with the Royal Artillery, before being attached to the Royal Flying Corps. He was killed on 26 June 1917 when his B.E.2 biplane went into a spinning nosedive at 3,000 feet and crashed at Filton, near Bristol. He was buried in the family vault at Holy Trinity Church, Ystrad Mynach. Archibald served with the Royal Monmouthshire Royal Engineers and was killed by a sniper at Hébuterne on 26 March 1918. He was buried at Foncquevillers Military Cemetery. Claud joined the Royal Field Artillery and was killed while commanding his battery in a rearguard action near Domart, France, on 31 March 1918, less than a week after his brother. He was buried at Hailles Communal Cemetery. In August 2014, Glamorgan County Cricket Club remembered the Lindsay family with a special display in the Museum of Welsh Cricket at the club's Sophia Gardens Stadium.

Ellen married Richard Cope Wilson (1892–1949) in July 1921. She was awarded the British Empire Medal in the 1955 Birthday Honours for her services with the Nottinghamshire Women's Voluntary Services. She died on 9 February 1990.

Nesta married Gerald Towell Stoneham (1890–1982) in July 1927. She was appointed M.B.E. in the 1943 Birthday Honours for her work as commander of the Auxiliary Fire Service in the East End of London during The Blitz, and her work at the National Fire Service Staff College. She died on 11 June 1957.

The family home at Ystrad Fawr was later acquired by Caerphilly Borough Council, and was subsequently demolished and is now the site of the Ysbyty Ystrad Fawr hospital.

== Death and tributes ==
Lindsay died, aged 78, at his home at Ystrad Fawr on Friday 1 November 1935. He was buried at Holy Trinity Church, Ystrad Mynach on 5 November 1935; the funeral service was conducted by The Revd. Alfred Monahan, the then Archdeacon of Monmouth and Chaplain to the Royal Monmouthshire Royal Engineers with a full military service. The streets of the town were lined with thousands of people. A memorial service was held at Holy Trinity Church on Sunday 17 November, conducted by the Bishop of Llandaff, The Right Revd. Timothy Rees. The bishop paid this tribute to Col. Morgan Lindsay:

Col. Lindsay's name was held in respect and reverence by all who knew him. He was a great gentleman, a great Christian, and a great Churchman. He was a great gentleman not simply by reason of birth, education, and position, but by reason also of qualities he possessed that made him a gentleman. A gentleman was a man who thought of other people before himself, and Col. Lindsay was one. People saw the integrity of his character, his kind deeds, and generosity as a Christian. and knew that those acts sprang from the grasp he had of eternal realities, the things of the spirit. His outward conduct revealed an inward conviction. He valued the Church not because it was an ancient institution, but because he found in the sacraments and ministry of the Church that which satisfied his soul.

== Bibliography ==
- Collett, Mike (2003). The Complete Record of the FA Cup. Sports Books. ISBN 1-899807-19-5.
- Gibbons, Philip (2001). Association Football in Victorian England – A History of the Game from 1863 to 1900. Upfront Publishing. ISBN 1-84426-035-6.
- Warsop, Keith (30 November 2004). The Early F.A. Cup Finals and the Southern Amateurs. Nottingham: SoccerData. ISBN 978-1899468782.
- "Lindsay, Lieut.-Col. Henry Edzell Morgan" . Thom's Irish Who's Who . Dublin: Alexander Thom and Son Ltd. 1923. p. 137 – via Wikisource.
