= Alfred Thomas, 1st Baron Pontypridd =

Welsh politician (1840–1927)

Alfred Thomas c1895

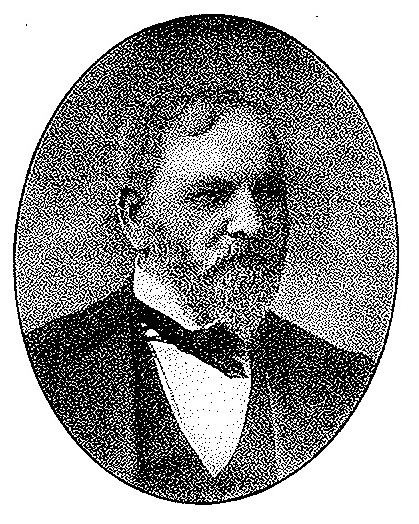
Sir Alfred Thomas c1906

Alfred Thomas, 1st Baron Pontypridd DL (16 September 1840 – 14 December 1927), was a Welsh Liberal Party politician, who served as MP for East Glamorganshire from 1885 until 1910, when he was elevated to the peerage as Lord Pontypridd.

== Background and education ==
Thomas was born at Llwyn y Grant, Llanedeyrn, in what is now a part of Cardiff, Wales. His father was Daniel Thomas, owner of the lime kilns at Llandough and a contractor with offices in Grangetown, Cardiff).

He was educated at Weston School, near Bath, but he decided not to pursue a university career to join his father's business. Early in his business career, Thomas was involved with the construction of the Rhondda Fach branch of the Taff Vale Railway. As a result, he became acquainted with the areas which he later represented in Parliament.

Thomas had also studied for a short time as a lay student at Regent's Park College under Joseph Angus. His father was a prominent Baptist, and Thomas joined the congregation at Tabernacle Church, Cardiff, where he later became a deacon.

== Early political career ==
Thomas became member of Cardiff Borough Council for Roath in 1875 and served on the council until 1886, being mayor in 1881–2. During the 1880s, Thomas was instrumental in a number of measures to address the inadequate water supply for Cardiff. In 1884 a committee under his chairmanship secures the Cardiff Corporation Act which provided for the Taff Fawr reservoir. He was also involved with the construction of the Llanishen reservoir and the later construction of waterworks at Llanishen which Thomas opened on 28 October 1886.

As mayor he was central to the decision to locate the University College of South Wales and Monmouthshire in Cardiff, rather than Swansea. He gave £1,000 towards the building fund and the decision to locate the university at Cardiff was announced before the end of his term as Mayor. In later years he was a generous benefactor of the University. Another landmark during his mayoral year was the opening of the Cardiff Free Library and Museum. Following his election to Parliament, Thomas stood down as a member of the council in 1886, but on 13 August 1888 he was created a Freeman of the borough.

== Parliamentary career ==
As a prominent public figure and through his nonconformist connections, Thomas began to be considered as a possible parliamentary candidate. In 1882 he was mentioned as a possible candidate for Cardiganshire should David Davies choose to retire. More realistic prospects appeared following the redistribution of seats in 1885 which led to the creation of additional constituencies in Glamorgan. In April 1885, Thomas was among six candidates nominated by the local Liberal Association for selection as candidate for the Rhondda constituency. Shortly afterwards, Thomas emerged as a leading contender for the Liberal nomination in East Glamorganshire, and after several months of campaigning he saw off the challenge of his main rival, Bowen Rowlands.

At the 1885 general election Thomas was elected Member of Parliament for East Glamorganshire, winning over 70% of the votes and defeating his Conservative opponent Godfrey Clark by 2,800 votes. He continued to represent the constituency until his retirement at the December 1910 general election. In 1891, Thomas, working with T. E. Ellis introduced the National Institutions (Wales) Bill, providing for a Secretary of State for Wales and a University of Wales, as well as a Welsh Parliament, to be located in Aberystwyth. The Bill did not secure a Second Reading. He was also involved with Cymru Fydd, serving as President of the Welsh National Federation, the body formed by the merger of Cymru Fydd and the North Wales Liberal Federation. He was elected Chairman of the Welsh Parliamentary Liberal Party in 1898.

General election 1895: East Glamorganshire Electorate 12,981
Party	Candidate	Votes	%	±%
Liberal	Alfred Thomas	6,055		
Conservative	C. J. Jackson	3,909		
Majority		2,146		
Turnout				
Liberal hold		Swing		

General election 25 September – 24 October 1900: East Glamorganshire
Party	Candidate	Votes	%	±%
Liberal	Alfred Thomas	6,994	63.2	N/A
Conservative	H. Lindsay	4,080	36.8	N/A
Majority		2,914	26.3	N/A
Turnout		11,074	N/A	N/A
Liberal hold		Swing	N/A	

General election 15 January – 20 February 1910: East Glamorganshire Electorate 23,979
Party	Candidate	Votes	%	±%
Liberal	Sir Alfred Thomas	14,721	72.0	
Conservative	Frank Hall Gaskell	5,727	28.0	
Majority		8,994	44.0	
Turnout		20,448	85.3	N/A
Liberal hold		Swing		

He was knighted in the 1902 Coronation Honours, receiving the accolade from King Edward VII at Buckingham Palace on 24 October that year.

He was raised to the peerage as Baron Pontypridd, of Cardiff in the County of Glamorgan, in 1912, with the motto "Bit Ben Bit Bont" (Let Him Be Himself the Bridge), a motto taken from the Mabinogion.

== Other public positions ==
Apart from his political career Thomas was a Justice of the Peace for Cardiff and Glamorgan, Deputy Lieutenant for Glamorgan from December 1901, first President of the National Museum of Wales, President of Cardiff University and President of the Baptist Union of Wales for 1886. Thomas was a staunch Nonconformist, a member and deacon of Tabernacle Baptist Church, Cardiff. Despite his busy Parliamentary career, he made every effort to attend the mid-week prayer meeting, and combined his Parliamentary duties with the post of superintendent of the Sunday School, which he held for a generation. His election as a deacon of Tabernacle was one of his most prized honours, being conferred on him by those who knew him best. He composed hymn tunes and was committed to the cause of gospel temperance. He was involved in the 1904–1905 Welsh Revival.

== Personal life ==
Lord Pontypridd never married and the title became extinct on his death in December 1927, aged 87.

He left almost all of his estate, including his home, Bronwydd, Penylan, to the City of Cardiff. He is buried with his parents in Cathays Cemetery.

Bronwydd no longer exists, having been demolished as part of the construction of Eastern Avenue, but a "Bronwydd Close" nearby recalls its location.

== Sources ==
=== Books and Journals ===
- Morgan, Kenneth O. (1960). "Democratic Politics in Glamorgan, 1884-1914". Morgannwg. 4: 5–27.
- Morgan, Kenneth O (1991). Wales in British Politics 1868–1922 (3rd ed.). Cardiff: University of Wales Press. ISBN 0708311245.

== Sources ==
- Alfred Thomas, Welsh Biography Online.
- 'Great Welshmen of Modern Days' by Sir Thomas Hughes.
- Thomas Family Monument, Cathays Cemetery, Cardiff
- Alfred Thomas Papers, Cardiff Central Library

Parliament of the United Kingdom
New constituency	Member of Parliament for East Glamorganshire; 1885–1910	Succeeded by Clement Edwards
Peerage of the United Kingdom
New creation	Baron Pontypridd; 1912–1927	Extinct
