= David Hacking, 3rd Baron Hacking =

British arbitrator and politician

The Right Honourable The Lord Hacking

Member of the House of Lords
- Lord Temporal
- Elected hereditary peer 19 November 2021 – 29 April 2026
- By-election: 2021
- Preceded by: The 3rd Viscount Simon
- Succeeded by: Seat abolished
- Hereditary peerage 7 November 1971 – 11 November 1999
- Preceded by: The 2nd Baron Hacking
- Succeeded by: Seat abolished

Personal details
- Born: Douglas David Hacking; 17 April 1938 (age 88)
- Party: Conservative (until 1998); Labour (1998–2003, 2021–2026)
- Education: Clare College, Cambridge; Inns of Court School of Law

Douglas David Hacking, 3rd Baron Hacking (born 17 April 1938), is a British arbitrator, barrister and hereditary peer. He sat in the House of Lords from 1971 to 1999 and again from 2021 to 2026, first as a Conservative, then for Labour from 1998 onwards.

== Education and military career ==
He was educated at Aldro preparatory school, Charterhouse and Clare College, Cambridge, from where he graduated BA in 1961; he received his MA in 1968. His professional education was at the Inns of Court School of Law. He served in the Royal Naval Reserve from 1954 to 1964, seeing active service 1956–8 and reaching the rank of Lieutenant.

== Career in law ==
Hacking is a qualified barrister and solicitor in England and Wales as well as an attorney in the United States. He has worked for over 40 years as an international arbitrator and mediator of commercial disputes.

== House of Lords ==
Having inherited the title Baron Hacking from his father in 1971, Hacking sat in the House of Lords for over 20 years, contributing to reform of arbitration law and related areas. Having sat as a Conservative, in 1998 he defected to Labour over the European and law and order policies of then party leader William Hague. He lost his automatic right to a seat under the House of Lords Act 1999.

He sought to return to the House in the by-election caused by the death of Lord Milner of Leeds in 2003. From 2009 to 2014, he stood in several subsequent by-elections as a crossbencher, but only succeeded in 2021 as a Labour candidate to replace Viscount Simon, 47 years after he first entered the Lords in 1974. He took the oath again on 2 December 2021, and Lord Hacking made his second maiden speech on 7 February 2022, reflecting on the number of baronesses in the Lords compared to when he left in 1999, remembering his first maiden speech nearly 50 years earlier (on 26 April 1972) and the number of amendments to legislation going through the Lords. Lord Hacking is the oldest hereditary peer to have been elected during hereditary peers by-elections.

== Arms ==
Coat of arms of David Hacking, 3rd Baron Hacking
Crest In front of an oak tree eradicated two axes in saltire all Proper. Escutcheon Argent on a chevron Azure between three roses Gules barbed and seeded Proper two bird bolts of the field feathered Or. Supporters On either side a griffin Gules on the shoulder an escutcheon Argent charged with a blue-bottle (cyanus) stalked and leaved Proper. Motto Dominus Providebit

Peerage of the United Kingdom
Preceded by Douglas Hacking	Baron Hacking; 1971–present Member of the House of Lords (1971–1999)	Incumbent; Heir apparent: Hon. Douglas Hacking
Parliament of the United Kingdom
Preceded by The Viscount Simon	Elected hereditary peer to the House of Lords under the House of Lords Act 1999; 2021–2026	Position abolished under the House of Lords (Hereditary Peers) Act 2026
