= David Lindsay, 27th Earl of Crawford =

British politician (1871–1940)

The Right Honourable The Earl of Crawford and Balcarres KT PC DL FRS FSA
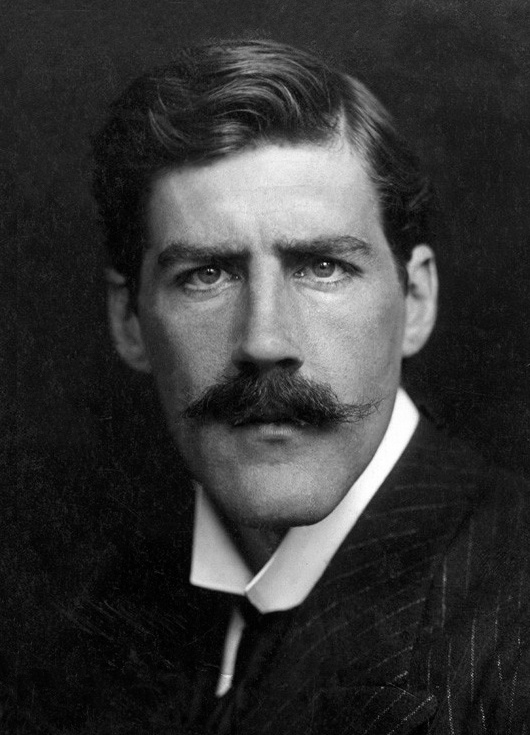

Minister of Transport
- In office 12 April 1922 – 19 October 1922
- Monarch: George V
- Prime Minister: David Lloyd George
- Preceded by: The Viscount Peel
- Succeeded by: Sir John Baird, Bt

First Commissioner of Works
- In office 1 April 1921 – 19 October 1922
- Monarch: George V
- Prime Minister: David Lloyd George
- Preceded by: Sir Alfred Mond, Bt
- Succeeded by: Sir John Baird, Bt

Chancellor of the Duchy of Lancaster
- In office 10 January 1919 – 1 April 1921
- Monarch: George V
- Prime Minister: David Lloyd George
- Preceded by: The Lord Downham
- Succeeded by: The Viscount Peel

Lord Keeper of the Privy Seal
- In office 15 December 1916 – 10 January 1919
- Monarch: George V
- Prime Minister: David Lloyd George
- Preceded by: The Earl Curzon of Kedleston
- Succeeded by: Bonar Law

President of the Board of Agriculture
- In office 11 July 1916 – 5 December 1916
- Monarch: George V
- Prime Minister: H. H. Asquith
- Preceded by: The Earl of Selborne
- Succeeded by: Rowland Prothero

Lord Commissioner of the Treasury
- In office 11 October 1903 – 4 December 1905
- Monarch: Edward VII
- Prime Minister: Arthur Balfour
- Preceded by: Henry Torrens Anstruther
- Succeeded by: Herbert Lewis

Member of the House of Lords Lord Temporal
- In office 1 February 1913 – 8 March 1940; Hereditary Peerage
- Preceded by: The 26th Earl of Crawford
- Succeeded by: The 28th Earl of Crawford

Member of Parliament for Chorley
- In office 7 June 1895 – 31 January 1913
- Preceded by: Joseph Feilden
- Succeeded by: Henry Hibbert

Personal details
- Born: 10 October 1871 Dunecht, Aberdeenshire
- Died: 8 March 1940 (aged 68)
- Party: Conservative
- Spouse: Constance Pelly (d. 1947)
- Children: 8
- Education: Magdalen College, Oxford

Military service
- Allegiance: United Kingdom
- Branch/service: British Army
- Battles/wars: World War I: Western Front

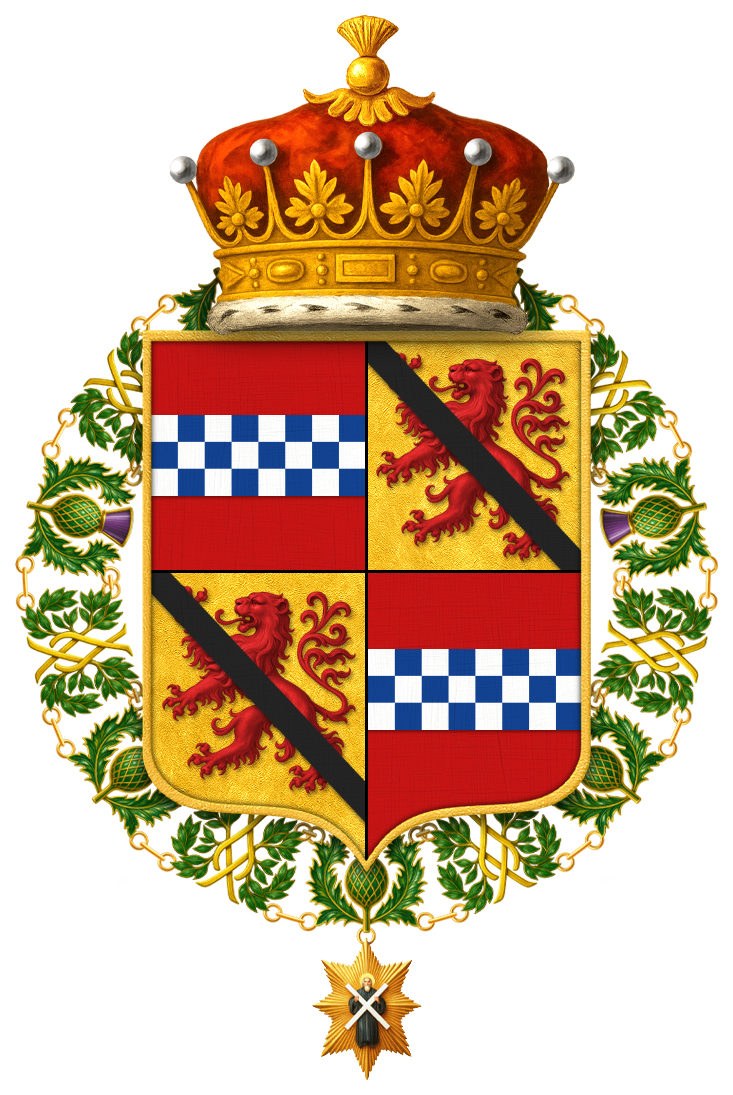
Shield of Arms of David Alexander Edward Lindsay, 27th Earl of Crawford and 10th Earl of Balcarres, KT, PC, DL, FRS, FSA

David Alexander Edward Lindsay, 27th Earl of Crawford and 10th Earl of Balcarres, KT, PC, DL, FRS, FSA (10 October 1871 – 8 March 1940), styled Lord Balcarres or Lord Balniel between 1880 and 1913, was a British Conservative politician and art connoisseur.

== Background and education ==
Born at Dunecht, Aberdeenshire, the future Lord Crawford was the eldest son of The 26th Earl of Crawford and 9th Earl of Balcarres and his wife, Emily Florence, daughter of Colonel Edward Bootle-Wilbraham. Sir Ronald Lindsay was his younger brother. He was educated at Eton and Magdalen College, Oxford.

His family had extensive mining interests on the Lancashire Coalfield at Haigh near Wigan where his family had a seat at Haigh Hall. He was chairman of the Wigan Coal and Iron Company and its successor the Wigan Coal Corporation.

Prior to the First World War he had held the rank of Captain in the 1st (Volunteer) Battalion, Manchester Regiment, from which he resigned in early 1903. During World War I, in early 1915, at 43 years of age, and having refused an offer of the Viceroyalty of India, he enlisted as a private in the Royal Army Medical Corps, which was almost unheard of at that time as hereditary peers and their heirs or university graduates such as himself were generally commissioned as officers. He thus swapped palaces in India and the prospect of a comfortable administrative position for the reality of a front line clearing station's operating theatre. At times up to 1,000 casualties each day passed through the clearing station at Hazebrouck, where he was stationed. This was when he developed what were described by his granddaughter, Rose Luce, as 'mixed feelings' about members of the officer classes (his own 'class', of course). In 2013 his diaries of his experiences were published as the memoir Private Lord Crawford's Great War Diaries: From Medical Orderly to Cabinet Minister, edited by his grandson Christopher Arnander.

He became a Fellow of the Society of Antiquaries in 1900 also of the Royal Society in 1924 and was made a Knight of the Thistle in 1921.

The Earl said of himself that "he was publicly known as the premier Scots earl, whereas in reality, he was a Lancashire coal merchant". On one occasion he invited the other governors of the John Rylands Library to view an exhibition of the treasures of his library and a number of other professors of the Victoria University of Manchester were also present. Among these was the professor of commerce, George William Daniels, who paid the earl and countess the following compliment, "You know, it's worth five centuries of breeding to breed two like those".

He was a keen book collector, particularly of Victorian erotica, and bequeathed in his will over 100 volumes to the British Museum, which were subsequently placed in the Private Case.

== Political career ==
Crawford was elected Member of Parliament for Chorley in 1895 and served as a Junior Lord of the Treasury from 1903 to 1905 under Arthur Balfour. After the Conservatives went into opposition in 1905 he was Chief Conservative Whip in the House of Commons between 1911 and 1913. The latter year he succeeded his father in the earldom and took his seat in the House of Lords (in virtue of his junior title of Baron Wigan, which was in the Peerage of the United Kingdom).

In July 1916 Crawford was admitted to the Privy Council and appointed President of the Board of Agriculture, with a seat in the cabinet, in the coalition government of H. H. Asquith.

When David Lloyd George became Prime Minister in December 1916, Crawford became Lord Privy Seal. In January 1919 Lloyd George appointed him Chancellor of the Duchy of Lancaster, but removed him from the cabinet. He was made First Commissioner of Works in April 1921, and in April of the following year he was also made Minister of Transport, and restored to the cabinet. He retained these two posts until the coalition government fell in October 1922.

== Later career ==
Crawford was Chancellor of the University of Manchester between 1923 and 1940, a trustee of the National Portrait Gallery and a deputy lieutenant of Lancashire. He served as President of the Committee commissioning the Survey of London which documented the capital's principal buildings and public art.

== Family ==
Lord Balcarres married, at St Margaret's, Westminster, on 25 January 1900, Constance Lilian Pelly, daughter of Sir Henry Pelly, 3rd Baronet and Lady Lillian Harriet Charteris, daughter of Francis Charteris, 10th Earl of Wemyss. They had eight children, two sons and six daughters:

- David Alexander Robert Lindsay, 28th Earl of Crawford (20 November 1900 – 13 December 1975)
- Lady Margaret Cynthia Lindsay (27 June 1902 - 1997), married Henry Cyril Harker Illingworth.
- Lady Cynthia Anne Lindsay (21 June 1904 – 5 January 1997)
- Hon James Louis Lindsay (16 December 1906 – 27 August 1997), Conservative member of parliament for Devon North from 1955 to 1959.
- Lady Elizabeth Patricia Lindsay (15 September 1908 – 4 February 1937)
- Lady Mary Lilian Lindsay (27 September 1910 – 25 March 2004), married Reginald Manningham-Buller, 1st Viscount Dilhorne, Lord Chancellor of Great Britain from 1962 to 1964. Their daughter Baroness Manningham-Buller was Director-General of MI5 from 2002 to 2007.
- Lady Katharine Constance Lindsay (26 August 1912 - c November 1972), married Sir Godfrey Nicholson, 1st Baronet. Their daughter is Baroness Nicholson of Winterbourne.
- Lady Barbara Lindsay (31 December 1915 – 20 July 2001)

Lord Crawford died in March 1940, aged 68 and was succeeded in his titles by his eldest son David, Lord Balniel. The Countess of Crawford died in January 1947.

Parliament of the United Kingdom
| Preceded by Joseph Feilden | Member of Parliament for Chorley; 1895 – 1913 | Succeeded by Sir Henry Flemming Hibbert |
Political offices
| Preceded by Henry Torrens Anstruther; Ailwyn Fellowes; Henry Forster | Lord of the Treasury; 1903–1905; With: Ailwyn Fellowes 1903–1905; Henry Forster 1903–1905; Lord Edmund Talbot 1905 | Succeeded by Herbert Lewis; Jack Pease; Freeman Freeman-Thomas; Cecil Norton |
| Preceded by The Earl of Selborne | President of the Board of Agriculture; 1916 | Succeeded by Rowland Prothero |
| Preceded by The Earl Curzon of Kedleston | Lord Privy Seal; 1916–1919 | Succeeded by Bonar Law |
| Preceded by The Lord Downham | Chancellor of the Duchy of Lancaster; 1919–1921 | Succeeded by The Viscount Peel |
| Preceded by Sir Alfred Mond, Bt | First Commissioner of Works; 1921–1922 | Succeeded by Sir John Baird, Bt |
| Preceded by The Viscount Peel | Minister of Transport; 1922 | Succeeded by Sir John Baird, Bt |
Peerage of Scotland
| Preceded by James Lindsay | Earl of Crawford; Earl of Balcarres; 1913–1940 | Succeeded by David Lindsay |
Professional and academic associations
| Preceded by Charles Hercules Read | President of the Society of Antiquaries of London; 1924–29 | Succeeded by Charles Reed Peers |
| Preceded by George William Daniels | President of the Manchester Statistical Society; 1933–35 | Succeeded by A. Linney Arnold |
