= Clement Edwards =

Welsh lawyer, journalist, activist and politician

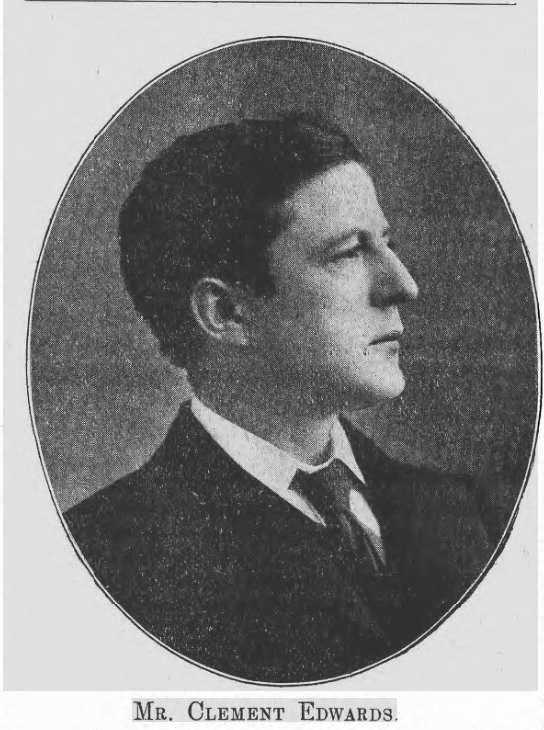
Clement Edwards

Allen Clement Edwards (7 June 1869 – 23 June 1938) was a Welsh lawyer, journalist, trade union activist and Liberal Party politician.

== Family and education ==
Edwards was born in Knighton in Radnorshire, the son of a master tailor and draper, one of seven children. He was educated at the local school in Knighton, undertook private studies and also attended evening classes at Birkbeck Institute in London. In 1890, Edwards married Fanny Emerson, the daughter of the superintendent of Trinity House, Great Yarmouth. She died in 1920. Two years later Edwards was remarried, to Alice May Parker, a political colleague in the NDP. They had one son, John Charles Gordon Clement Edwards (1924–2004) who served in the Royal Naval Volunteer Reserve in the Second World War and later became a solicitor.

In religion, although born into an Anglican family, Edwards became a Congregationalist and was considered a typical Welsh-speaking champion of nonconformist causes.

== The law ==
Edwards began his law career working in a solicitor's office. In 1899, he was called to the Bar by the Middle Temple. As a barrister specialising in trade union and labour law he was briefed in some of the most important cases of the day concerning the rights of trade unions to engage in industrial and political action. He was drawn to trade union cases and in the Taff Vale case of 1901 he was one of Counsel briefed on behalf of the trade union. He was also briefed in another railway action, the Osborne case, concerning trade union support for MPs

== Trade Union activism ==
Edward's law work for the unions strengthened his political and social awareness and from the 1880s, he was involved in the formation of trade unions for unskilled workers.

Despite his legal connections to the railway unions, Edwards developed a special connection with the dock workers and was at one time assistant secretary of the Dock, Wharf, Riverside and General Labourers' Union. He was also general secretary of the federation of dockland and transport unions. Edwards had a flair for mass organisation. In the great dock strike of 1889, he was one of John Burns' lieutenants in the organisation of the dispute and in 1893, he organised a mass demonstration in Hyde Park in aid of miners and their families undergoing severe hardship and was also responsible for another demonstration at the same venue by 30,000 laundresses. During his time working for the dock labourers, Edwards was to play a leading part in the public inquiry which looked into the sinking of the RMS Titanic.

He put the miners' case following the infamous 1913 Senghenydd Colliery Disaster in which 439 men died. But Edwards never conceived of the trade unions as the industrial arm of the socialist movement. He understood them as the working-man's defence against unfair employers and a protection against an economic system which produced personal poverty, immorality, and misery.

== Politics ==
From trade union activism, Edwards expanded into political activity, including radical journalism, becoming labour editor of the London newspaper The Sun in 1893 and then The Echo in 1894. He then transferred to the Daily News where he held the title Special Commissioner. Edwards was always active in the Welsh radical tradition and was strongly opposed to a separate Labour Party.

Edwards was a member of the Fabian Society and in local politics he stood for election as Progressive Party candidate for the London School Board in 1894 in Islington before being elected to Islington Vestry to represent Thornhill ward in 1898. He stood unsuccessfully for parliament as a Liberal in 1895 for Tottenham and in 1900 for Denbigh Boroughs before winning in Denbigh in 1906. He stood for re-election there in January 1910 but lost by just eight votes. However, he was quickly selected for another Welsh seat, this time with a more secure Liberal vote, and in December 1910, he was elected as MP for the mining seat of East Glamorganshire in a three-cornered contest against Unionist and Labour opposition.

The coming of the First World War presented the Liberal Party with many difficult political decisions over essentially illiberal legislation such as the Defence of the Realm Act, which gave the government wide-ranging powers and on the question of conscription. As W. Llewelyn Williams, Liberal MP for Carmarthen put it, "...it would be a tragedy worse than war if, in order to win the war, England ceased to be the beacon of freedom and liberty she has been in the past." However it was hard to stand up against the tide of patriotic fervour sweeping the country and this infected Edwards as it did many others on the radical wing of the party.

General election 1900: Denbigh Boroughs
Party	Candidate	Votes	%	±%
Conservative	Hon. George Thomas Kenyon	1,862	51.5	
Liberal	Allen Clement Edwards	1,752	48.5	
Majority		110	3.0	
Turnout		3,614		
Conservative hold		Swing		

General election 1906 Denbigh Boroughs
Party	Candidate	Votes	%	±%
Liberal	Allen Clement Edwards	2,533	56.4	+7.9
Conservative	Hon. George Thomas Kenyon	1,960	43.6	−7.9
Majority		573	12.8	15.8
Turnout			94.5	+7.1
Liberal gain from Conservative		Swing	+7.9	

General election January 1910: Denbigh Boroughs
Party	Candidate	Votes	%	±%
Conservative	Hon. William George Arthur Ormsby-Gore	2,438	50.1	
Liberal	Allen Clement Edwards	2,430	49.9	
Majority		8	0.2	
Turnout		4,868		
Conservative gain from Liberal		Swing		

December 1910 United Kingdom general election: East Glamorgan
Party	Candidate	Votes	%	±%
Liberal	Allen Clement Edwards	9,088	46.9	
Conservative	Frank Hall Gaskell	5,603	28.9	
Labour	Charles Butt Stanton	4,675	24.1	n/a
Majority		3,485	18.0	
Turnout		19,366	80.8	
Liberal hold		Swing		

=== National Democratic Party ===
With former union leader Ben Tillett and other Labour men from a trade union background, Edwards backed David Lloyd George, notably in efforts to prevent industrial unrest and keep the war effort on track. In 1916, the British Workers League was formed as an organisation for patriotic labour to get behind the war effort and for commercial preference within the British Empire. Edwards was drawn to the League which changed its name to the National Democratic Party for the 1918 general election. The party won nine seats at the election. Edwards was the NDP candidate for East Ham South where he was elected as a supporter of the Coalition government in 1918. He may have been granted the Coalition coupon but was opposed by a Unionist and his Labour opponent was Arthur Henderson the future leader of the Labour Party. Edwards was the chairman of the NDP in Parliament from 1918 to 1920. The development of the Labour Party, post-war industrial unrest of which Edwards continued to disapprove and the increasing unpopularity of the Lloyd George coalition, combined to undermine the NDP's appeal to patriotic labour and the party was wound up. Edwards defended East Ham South at the 1922 general election as a National Liberal supporter of Lloyd George, but was pushed into third place in a three-cornered contest won by Labour's Alfred Barnes.

General election 1918: East Ham South
Party	Candidate	Votes	%	±%
National Democratic	Allen Clement Edwards	7,972	42.8	n/a
Unionist	Robert Frederick Frank Hamlett	5,661	30.3	n/a
Labour	Rt Hon. Arthur Henderson	5,024	26.9	n/a
Majority		2,311	12.5	n/a
Turnout			57.5	n/a
National Democratic win				

General election 1922: East Ham South
Party	Candidate	Votes	%	±%
Labour	Alfred John Barnes	10,566	48.1	+21.2
Liberal	Edward Smallwood	6,567	30.0	n/a
National Liberal	Allen Clement Edwards	4,793	21.9	−20.9
Majority		3,999	18.1	
Turnout			66.3	
Labour gain from National Democratic		Swing	n/a	

=== Later life ===
Edwards did not stand for Parliament again. After the demise of the NDP he re-joined the Liberal Party. He remained a champion of union rights during the industrial turmoil of the 1920s but took little part in public or political affairs after losing his Parliamentary seat. He remained a Liberal Party member until 1931, when he lost faith with the party leaders and resigned his membership. He continued in the law until retirement.

== Death ==
Edwards died of cancer at Manor House Hospital, Golders Green, on 23 June 1938, aged 69. He was cremated at Golders Green Crematorium.

== Publications ==
- Railway Nationalization, Methuen & Co., 1898
- The Children's Labour Question, Daily News, 1899
- (Jointly with George Haw) No Room to Live: the plaint of overcrowded London, Wells Gardner & Co., London, 1900 (reprinted from the Daily News)
- The Compensation Act, 1906: Who pays? to whom, to what, and when it applies, Chatto & Windus, 1907
- Articles and journalism on labour, economics, industry and politics

Parliament of the United Kingdom
Preceded by George Thomas Kenyon	Member of Parliament for Denbigh Boroughs; 1906 – January 1910	Succeeded by Hon. William Ormsby-Gore
Preceded by Alfred Thomas	Member of Parliament for East Glamorganshire; December 1910 – 1918	Constituency abolished
New constituency	Member of Parliament for East Ham South; 1918 – 1922	Succeeded by Alfred John Barnes
