= Douglas Hacking, 1st Baron Hacking =

British politician

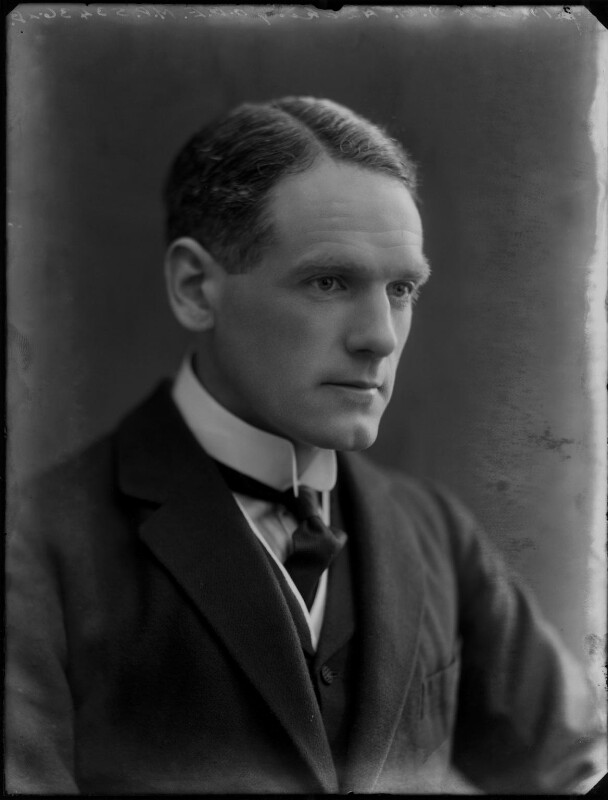
Lord Hacking

Douglas Hewitt Hacking, 1st Baron Hacking OBE PC DL JP (4 August 1884 – 29 July 1950) was a British Conservative politician.

== Early life and military career ==
Educated at Giggleswick School and Manchester University, he was commissioned in the East Lancashire Regiment in August 1914 and served two years in France during World War I. He was mentioned in despatches and was appointed to the Order of the British Empire as an Officer (OBE) in the 1919 New Year Honours. In World War II, from 1940 to 1944, he served with the 5th Battalion Surrey Home Guard.

== Political career ==
Hacking was elected as Unionist Member of Parliament (MP) for the Chorley Division of Lancashire in December 1918 and sat for the constituency until June 1945.

He was Parliamentary Private Secretary to Sir James Craig at the Ministry of Pensions in 1920 and at the Admiralty from 1920 to 1921; then to Sir Laming Worthington-Evans as Secretary of State for War from 1921 to 1922. He was Vice-Chamberlain of the Household from 1922 to 1924 and from November 1924 to December 1925; Conservative Whip, 1922–1925.

He held junior ministerial office as Parliamentary Under-Secretary of State for the Home Department, and Representative of the Office of Works in the House of Commons from 1925 to 1927; as Secretary for Overseas Trade, Parliamentary Secretary to the Board of Trade, and Parliamentary Under-Secretary of State for Foreign Affairs, 1927–1929; as Parliamentary Under-Secretary of State for the Home Department, 1933–1934; as Financial Secretary to the War Office, 1934–1935; and as Parliamentary Under-Secretary of State for Dominion Affairs, 1935–1936.

He appointed to be a Justice of the Peace and Deputy Lieutenant for the County of Surrey in 1940. He was awarded the Freedom of the Borough of Chorley on 30 November 1946.

He was created a Baronet, of Altham in the County Palatine of Lancaster in the 1938 Birthday Honours, was sworn of the Privy Council in the 1929 Dissolution Honours and was raised to the peerage as Baron Hacking, of Chorley in the County Palatine of Lancaster in the 1945 Dissolution Honours.

== Other positions held ==
He was a member of Empire Parliamentary Delegation to South Africa, 1924; chairman of Home Office Committee on Compensation for Silicosis, 1926; chairman of Home Office Committee on Taxicabs (Conditions of Licensing, etc.), 1927; chairman of Committee on redistribution of Royal Ordnance Factories, 1934; chancellor of the Primrose League, 1931; vice-chairman, National Union of Conservative and Unionist Associations, 1930–1932; government delegate to League of Nations, Geneva, 1933; chairman Conservative Party Organisation, 1936–1942; member General Medical Council, 1932–1947.

== Arms ==
Coat of arms of Douglas Hacking, 1st Baron Hacking
Crest In front of an oak tree eradicated two axes in saltire all Proper. Escutcheon Argent on a chevron Azure between three roses Gules barbed and seeded Proper two bird bolts of the field feathered Or. Supporters On either side a griffin Gules on the shoulder an escutcheon Argent charged with a blue-bottle (cyanus) stalked and leaved Proper. Motto Dominus Providebit

Parliament of the United Kingdom
Preceded by Sir Henry Flemming Hibbert	Member of Parliament for Chorley; 1918–1945	Succeeded by Clifford Kenyon
Political offices
Preceded by William Dudley Ward	Vice-Chamberlain of the Household; 1922–1924	Succeeded by John Davison
Preceded by John Davison	Vice-Chamberlain of the Household; 1924–1925	Succeeded by George Hennessy
Preceded by Godfrey Locker-Lampson	Under-Secretary of State for the Home Department; 1925–1927	Succeeded by Vivian Henderson
Preceded by Godfrey Locker-Lampson	Parliamentary Under-Secretary of State for Foreign Affairs jointly with Godfrey Locker-Lampson; 1927–1929	Succeeded by Hugh Dalton
Preceded by Oliver Stanley	Under-Secretary of State for the Home Department; 1933–1935	Succeeded by Harry Crookshank
Preceded by Duff Cooper	Financial Secretary to the War Office; 1934–1935	Succeeded by Sir Victor Warrender
Preceded by Lord Stanley	Under-Secretary of State for Dominion Affairs; 1935–1936	Succeeded by Marquess of Hartington
Peerage of the United Kingdom
New creation	Baron Hacking; 1945–1950	Succeeded by Douglas Eric Hacking
Baronetage of the United Kingdom
New creation	Baronet (of Altham); 1938–1950	Succeeded by Douglas Eric Hacking
