= Clifford Kenyon =

British politician (1896–1979)

Clifford Kenyon CBE

Member of Parliament for Chorley
- In office 5 July 1945 – 18 June 1970
- Preceded by: Douglas Hacking
- Succeeded by: Constance Monks

Personal details
- Born: 11 August 1896 Burnley, Lancashire, England
- Died: 29 April 1979 (aged 82) Rawtenstall, Lancashire, England
- Party: Labour
- Education: University of Manchester

Clifford Kenyon CBE (11 August 1896 – 29 April 1979) was a British farmer and politician.

Kenyon was educated at Brighton Grove College in Manchester, and the University of Manchester. He worked on his father's farm, Scarr Barn Farm at Crawshawbooth near Rossendale, which he eventually inherited.

In 1922 Kenyon joined the Labour Party and the next year was elected to Rawtenstall Council, of which he became Mayor from 1938 to 1942. He was appointed a justice of the peace for Lancashire in 1941. At the 1945 general election, Kenyon was elected as Labour Member of Parliament for Chorley.

Kenyon was a rare farmer on the Labour benches and often took up agricultural issues. He opposed agricultural subsidies and British membership of the European Economic Community. In 1950 he almost lost his seat to Andrew Fountaine, even though Fountaine's nomination by the Conservatives had officially been withdrawn. He remained a backbencher, and in the 1966 Parliament he was chairman of the Committee of Selection which chose members for other committees. The Liberal Party criticised him for picking only one Liberal MP to sit on the Standing Committee examining the 1968 Finance Bill.

At the 1970 general election, Kenyon retired; his seat went to the Conservative candidate Constance Monks.

Parliament of the United Kingdom
Preceded by Douglas Hacking	Member of Parliament for Chorley; 1945–1970	Succeeded by Constance Monks
