= Plaid Cymru election results =

UK political party election results

This article lists Plaid Cymru's election results in UK parliamentary, European parliamentary, and Senedd elections.

== Summary of electoral performance ==
=== Westminster elections ===
Year	Constituencies				Votes				
Year	Number of candidates	Saved deposits	Number of elected MPs	Change	Total	Average per candidate	% UK vote	% Welsh vote	Change (percentage points)
1929	1	0	–	Steady	609	609	0.0%	0.0%	New
1931	2	1	–	Steady	2,050	1,025	0.0%	0.2%	▲0.2
1935	1	0	–	Steady	2,534	2,534	0.0%	0.3%	▲0.1
1945	7	1	–	Steady	16,017	2,288	0.0%	1.2%	▲0.9
1950	7	1	–	Steady	17,580	2,288	0.1%	1.2%	▲0.0
1951	4	0	–	Steady	10,920	2,730	0.0%	0.7%	▼0.5
1955	11	4	–	Steady	45,119	4,102	0.2%	3.1%	▲2.4
1959	20	6	–	Steady	77,571	3,879	0.3%	5.2%	▲2.1
1964	23	2	–	Steady	69,507	3,022	0.3%	4.8%	▼0.2
1966	20	2	–	Steady	61,071	3,054	0.2%	4.3%	▼0.5
1970	36	11	–	Steady	175,016	4,862	0.6%	11.5%	▲7.2
1974 Feb	36	10	2	▲2	171,374	4,760	0.5%	10.8%	▼0.7
1974 Oct	36	10	3	▲1	166,321	4,620	0.6%	10.8%	Steady
1979	36	7	2	▼1	132,544	3,682	0.4%	8.2%	▼2.6
1983	38	6	2	Steady	125,309	3,298	0.4%	7.8%	▼0.4
1987	38	13	3	▲1	123,599	3,253	0.4%	7.3%	▼0.5
1992	38	15	4	▲1	156,796	4,126	0.5%	9.0%	▲1.7
1997	40	25	4	Steady	161,030	4,026	0.5%	9.9%	▲0.9
2001	40	35	4	Steady	195,893	4,897	0.7%	14.3%	▲4.4
2005	40	32	3	▼1	174,838	4,371	0.6%	12.6%	▼1.7
2010	40	29	3	Steady	165,394	4,135	0.6%	11.3%	▼1.3
2015	40	32	3	Steady	181,704	4,543	0.6%	12.1%	▲0.9
2017	40	24	4	▲1	164,466	4,112	0.5%	10.4%	▼1.7
2019	36	27	4	Steady	153,265	4,257	0.5%	9.9%	▼0.5
2024	32	29	4	Steady	194,811	6,088	0.7%	14.8%	▲4.9

=== Welsh Assembly / Senedd elections ===
Date	Constituency					Region					Total seats		
Date	Votes	%	+/-	Seats	+/-	Votes	%	+/-	Top-up seats	+/-	Total	+/-	%
1999	290,572	28.4%	N/A	9 / 40	N/A	312,048	30.5%	N/A	8 / 20	N/A	17 / 60	N/A	28.3%
2003	180,185	21.2%	▼7.2	5 / 40	▼4	167,653	19.7%	▼10.8	7 / 20	▼1	12 / 60	▼5	20.0%
2007	219,121	21.4%	▲1.2	7 / 40	▲2	204,757	21.0%	▲1.3	8 / 20	▲1	15 / 60	▲3	25.0%
2011	182,907	19.3%	▼3.1	5 / 40	▼2	169,799	17.9%	▼3.1	6 / 20	▼2	11 / 60	▼4	18.3%
2016	209,376	20.5%	▲1.3	6 / 40	▲1	211,548	20.8%	▲2.9	6 / 20	Steady	12 / 60	▲1	20.0%
2021	225,376	20.3%	▼0.2	5 / 40	▼1	230,161	20.7	▼0.1	8 / 20	▲2	13 / 60	▲1	21.6%
2026	444,665	35.4%	▲14.7	43 / 96	▲30	N/A	N/A	N/A	N/A	N/A	43 / 96	▲20	35.4%

=== European Parliament elections ===
Date	Votes			Welsh seats		
Date	#	%	+/-	#	+/-	%
1979	83,399	11.7%	N/A	0 / 4	N/A	0%
1984	103,031	12.2%	▲0.5	0 / 4	Steady	0%
1989	115,062	12.9%	▲0.7	0 / 4	Steady	0%
1994	162,478	17.1%	▲4.2	0 / 5	Steady	0%
1999	185,235	29.6%	▲12.5	2 / 5	▲2	40%
2004	159,888	17.4%	▼12.2	1 / 4	▼1	25%
2009	126,702	18.5%	▲1.1	1 / 4	Steady	25%
2014	111,864	15.3%	▼3.3	1 / 4	Steady	25%
2019	163,928	19.6%	▲4.3	1 / 4	Steady	25%

== Elections results ==
=== 1929 general election ===
Constituency	Candidate	Votes	%	Position
Caernarvonshire	Lewis Valentine	609	1.6	4

=== 1931 general election ===
Constituency	Candidate	Votes	%	Position
Caernarvonshire	John Edward Daniel	1,136	3.0	4
University of Wales	Saunders Lewis	914	29.1	2

=== 1935 general election ===
Constituency	Candidate	Votes	%	Position
Caernarvonshire	John Edward Daniel	2,534	6.9	3

=== By-elections 1935–1945 ===
Election	Candidate	Votes	%	Position
1943 University of Wales by-election	Saunders Lewis	1,330	22.5	2
1945 Caernarvon Boroughs by-election	John Edward Daniel	6,844	24.8	2
1945 Neath by-election	Wynne Samuel	6,290	16.2	2

=== 1945 general election ===
Constituency	Candidate	Votes	%	Position
Caernarvon Boroughs	John Edward Daniel	1,560	4.5	4
Caernarvonshire	Ambrose Bebb	2,152	5.4	3
Merioneth	Gwynfor Evans	2,448	10.3	4
Neath	Wynne Samuel	3,659	7.3	3
Ogmore	Trefor Richard Morgan	2,379	5.6	3
Rhondda East	James Kitchener Davies	2,123	6.1	3
University of Wales	Gwenan Jones	1,696	24.5	2

=== By-elections 1945–1950 ===
Election	Candidate	Votes	%	Position
1946 Ogmore by-election	Trefor Richard Morgan	5,685	29.4	2
1946 Aberdare by-election	Wynne Samuel	7,090	20.0	2

=== 1950 general election ===
Constituency	Candidate	Votes	%	Position
Aberdare	Wynne Samuel	3,310	7.5	3
Caernarvon	John Edward Jones	4,882	13.1	4
Llanelly	David Eirwyn Morgan	2,134	3.8	4
Merioneth	Gwynfor Evans	2,754	11.0	4
Rhondda East	David James Davies	1,357	3.9	4
Rhondda West	James Kitchener Davies	2,183	6.6	3
Wrexham	Geraint Bowen	960	1.7	4

=== 1951 general election ===
Constituency	Candidate	Votes	%	Position
Aberdare	Wynne Samuel	2,691	6.1	3
Llanelly	David Eirwyn Morgan	3,765	6.9	3
Rhondda West	James Kitchener Davies	2,467	7.7	3
Wrexham	Dan Thomas	1,997	3.6	3

=== By-elections 1951–1955 ===
Election	Candidate	Votes	%	Position
1955 Wrexham by-election	Elystan Morgan	4,572	11.3	3

=== 1955 general election ===
Constituency	Candidate	Votes	%	Position
Aberdare	Trefor Beasley	3,703	9.4	3
Abertillery	Trefor Richard Morgan	1,259	4.1	3
Anglesey	J. Rowland Jones	2,183	7.5	3
Caernarvon	Robert E. Jones	5,815	16.5	3
Carmarthen	Jennie Eirian Davies	3,835	7.8	3
Conway	Ioan Bowen Rees	3,019	7.8	3
Gower	Chris Rees	4,101	10.6	3
Llanelly	David Eirwyn Morgan	6,398	12.5	3
Merioneth	Gwynfor Evans	5,243	22.2	3
Rhondda East	Noel Williams	2,776	8.8	4
Rhondda West	Glyn James	4,424	15.3	2
Wrexham	Elystan Morgan	5,139	10.4	3

=== By-elections 1955–1959 ===
Election	Candidate	Votes	%	Position
1956 Newport by-election	Emrys Roberts	1,978	3.8	3
1957 Carmarthen by-election	Jennie Eirian Davies	5,741	11.5	3
1958 Pontypool by-election	Benjamin Morgan	2,927	10.0	3

=== 1959 general election ===
Constituency	Candidate	Votes	%	Position
Aberavon	Iixtyd Lewis	3,066	6.6	3
Aberdare	Ken Thomas	3,367	8.2	3
Anglesey	R. Tudur Jones	4,121	14.6	3
Caernarvon	Dafydd Orwig Jones	7,293	21.2	3
Caerphilly	John Howell	3,420	8.8	3
Cardiff North	Emrys Roberts	2,553	5.1	3
Cardigan	Gareth Evans	3,880	12.8	3
Carmarthen	Hywel Heulyn Roberts	2,545	5.2	3
Conway	Ioan Bowen Rees	2,852	7.6	4
Denbigh	Dafydd Alun Jones	3,077	7.2	4
Gower	J. Gwyn Griffiths	3,744	9.1	3
Llanelly	David Eirwyn Morgan	7,176	13.8	3
Merioneth	Gwynfor Evans	5,127	22.9	3
Pembrokeshire	Waldo Williams	2,253	4.3	3
Pontypool	Benjamin Morgan	2,519	6.6	3
Rhondda East	Noel Williams	2,776	8.8	4
Rhondda West	Glyn James	4,978	17.0	2
Swansea East	Chris Rees	4,651	10.5	3
West Flintshire	Nefyl Williams	1,594	4.1	4
Wrexham	Elystan Morgan	6,579	12.2	3

=== By-elections 1959–1964 ===
Election	Candidate	Votes	%	Position
1960 Ebbw Vale by-election	Emrys Roberts	2,091	7.0	4
1962 Montgomeryshire by-election	Islwyn Ffowc Elis	1,594	6.2	4
1963 Swansea East by-election	Chris Rees	1,620	5.2	4

=== 1964 general election ===
Constituency	Candidate	Votes	%	Position
Aberavon	Glyn John	2,118	4.6	3
Aberdare	Dewi Thomas	2,723	7.2	3
Anglesey	R. Tudur Jones	1,817	6.5	4
Brecon and Radnor	Trefor Richard Morgan	2,165	5.2	3
Caernarvon	Robert E. Jones	6,998	21.4	3
Caerphilly	Phil Williams	3,956	11.0	3
Cardiff North	Emrys Roberts	1,058	2.2	4
Cardigan	Gareth Evans	3,262	10.9	4
Carmarthen	Gwynfor Evans	5,495	11.7	3
Conway	Gwilym Hughes	3,058	8.3	3
Denbigh	Dafydd Alun Jones	3,444	7.9	4
Gower	J. Gwyn Griffiths	2,562	6.5	3
Llanelly	Pennar Davies	3,469	7.0	4
Merioneth	Elystan Morgan	3,697	16.9	3
Merthyr Tydfil	Ioan Bowen Rees	2,878	9.3	3
Montgomeryshire	Islwyn Ffowc Elis	2,167	8.5	4
Ogmore	Margaret Tucker	2,470	5.3	3
Pembrokeshire	Dyfrig Thomas	1,717	3.4	4
Pontypool	Benjamin Morgan	2,519	6.6	3
Rhondda East	Glyn James	2,361	8.2	4
Rhondda West	Henry V. Davies	2,668	10.2	3
Swansea East	Chris Rees	3,556	8.4	3
West Flintshire	Nefyl Williams	1,195	3.0	4
Wrexham	John R. Thomas	4,673	8.9	3

=== By-elections 1964–1966 ===
Election	Candidate	Votes	%	Position
1965 Abertillery by-election	Edward Merriman	1,551	6.7	3

=== 1966 general election ===
Constituency	Candidate	Votes	%	Position
Aberdare	J. Eaton Williams	3,073	8.6	3
Anglesey	John Wynn Meredith	2,596	9.6	3
Brecon and Radnor	Trefor Richard Morgan	2,410	6.1	3
Caernarvon	Humphrey Roberts	6,834	21.7	3
Caerphilly	John D. Howell	3,949	11.1	3
Cardiganshire	Edward Millward	2,469	8.1	4
Carmarthen	Gwynfor Evans	7,416	16.1	3
Conway	Robert E. Jones	2,552	6.7	3
Denbigh	Meredith Edwards	2,695	6.1	4
East Flintshire	Gwilym Hughes	902	1.9	4
Llanelli	Pennar Davies	5,132	10.9	3
Merioneth	Ieuan Lewis Jenkins	2,490	11.4	3
Merthyr Tydfil	Meic Stephens	3,361	11.5	3
Montgomeryshire	Trefor Edwards	1,841	7.4	4
Pembrokeshire	Jack Sheppard	2,460	5.0	4
Rhondda East	Glyn James	2,088	7.5	3
Rhondda West	Henry Victor Davies	2,172	8.7	2
Swansea East	Chris Rees	2,749	6.8	3
West Flintshire	D. Alun Lloyd	1,585	3.8	4
Wrexham	John R. Thomas	2,297	4.5	4

=== By-elections 1966–1970 ===
Election	Candidate	Votes	%	Position
1966 Carmarthen by-election	Gwynfor Evans	16,179	39.0	1
1967 Rhondda West by-election	Henry V. Davies	10,067	39.9	2
1968 Caerphilly by-election	Phil Williams	14,274	40.4	2

=== 1970 general election ===
Constituency	Candidate	Votes	%	Position
Aberavon	George Farmer	3,912	8.4	3
Aberdare	Gareth Morgan Jones	11,431	30.0	2
Abertillery	David B. Harries	1,751	6.2	3
Anglesey	John Lasarus Williams	7,140	22.1	3
Barry	Ogwen Williams	4,200	7.1	3
Bedwellty	Charles Davey	3,780	10.0	3
Brecon and Radnor	George Jenkins	2,349	5.4	3
Caernarfon	Robyn Lewis	11,331	33.4	2
Caerphilly	Phil Williams	11,505	28.5	2
Cardiff North	Morgan Edwards	1,927	4.1	4
Cardiff South East	Richard Davies	2,585	5.1	3
Cardiff West	D. J. Hughes	4,378	10.1	3
Cardiganshire	Hywel ap Robert	6,498	19.7	3
Carmarthen	Gwynfor Evans	14,812	30.1	2
Conway	Dafydd Elis-Thomas	4,311	10.8	3
Denbigh	E. Gwynn Matthews	5,254	11.0	4
East Flintshire	Gwilym Hughes	2,332	4.4	4
Ebbw Vale	Derek Baskerville	1,805	6.0	4
Gower	Clifford Davies	5,869	14.0	3
Llanelli	Carwyn James	8,387	16.8	2
Merionethshire	Dafydd Wigley	5,425	24.3	2
Merthyr Tydfil	Chris Rees	3,076	9.6	4
Monmouth	Stuart Neale	1,501	2.5	4
Montgomeryshire	Edward Millward	3,145	11.8	4
Neath	Glyn John	4,012	10.1	3
Newport	Bob Vickery	1,997	3.7	3
Ogmore	Ted Merriman	5,828	11.7	3
Pembrokeshire	Wynne Samuel	3,681	6.7	4
Pontypool	Harri Webb	2,053	5.3	3
Pontypridd	E. Jones	5,059	10.4	4
Rhondda East	Glyn James	6,931	24.3	2
Rhondda West	Henry Victor Davies	3,528	14.1	2
Swansea East	Roderick Evans	4,188	10.2	3
Swansea West	Guto ap Gwent	3,033	6.2	3
West Flintshire	Ogwen Jones	3,108	6.9	4
Wrexham	Cyril Golding	2,894	5.3	4

=== By-elections 1970–1974 ===
Election	Candidate	Votes	%	Position
1972 Merthyr Tydfil by-election	Emrys Roberts	11,852	37.0	2

=== February 1974 general election ===
Constituency	Candidate	Votes	%	Position
Aberavon	D. G. Foster	5,898	12.2	3
Aberdare	Glyn Owen	11,973	29.9	2
Abertillery	A. Richards	3,119	10.9	2
Anglesey	Dafydd Iwan	7,610	21.7	3
Barry	Valerie Wynne-Williams	1,924	3.4	4
Bedwellty	A. Moore	3,048	7.7	4
Brecon and Radnor	Dafydd Noel Gittins	2,099	4.7	4
Caernarfon	Dafydd Wigley	14,103	40.5	1
Caerphilly	Phil Williams	11,956	27.5	2
Cardiff North	P. Richards	1,586	4.6	4
Cardiff North West	Colin Palfrey	1,227	3.4	4
Cardiff South East	Keith Bush	1,254	3.0	5
Cardiff West	Dafydd Hughes	2,093	5.5	4
Cardiganshire	C. Davies	4,754	13.3	4
Carmarthen	Gwynfor Evans	17,162	34.3	2
Conway	M. Farmer	4,203	10.1	4
Denbigh	E. G. Matthews	4,103	8.1	4
East Flintshire	Neil Taylor	1,135	2.0	4
Ebbw Vale	J. D. Rogers	1,767	5.9	4
Gower	J. N. Harris	3,741	8.3	4
Llanelli	R. Williams	6,020	12.0	4
Merioneth	Dafydd Elis-Thomas	7,823	34.6	1
Merthyr Tydfil	Emrys Roberts	7,336	22.9	2
Monmouth	Ted Spanswick	930	1.5	4
Montgomeryshire	A. Jones	2,274	8.3	4
Neath	Huw Evans	8,758	21.5	2
Newport	P. Cox	936	1.6	4
Ogmore	Ted Merriman	5,139	9.6	4
Pembrokeshire	R. V. Davies	2,820	4.8	4
Pontypool	Roger Tanner	1,308	3.1	4
Pontypridd	Richard Anthony Kemp	4,612	8.6	4
Rhondda	Glyn James	6,739	12.9	2
Swansea East	John Graham Ball	5,135	11.9	3
Swansea West	Derrick Hearne	1,859	3.6	4
West Flintshire	Gwilym Hughes	2,296	4.4	4
Wrexham	H. W. Roberts	2,624	4.5	4

=== October 1974 general election ===
Constituency	Candidate	Votes	%	Position
Aberavon	G. Thomas	4,032	8.5	4
Aberdare	Glyn Owen	8,133	21.3	2
Abertillery	W. A. Richards	2,480	9.0	2
Anglesey	Dafydd Iwan	6,410	19.1	3
Barry	Valerie Wynne-Williams	1,793	3.3	4
Bedwellty	David Mogford	3,086	8.0	4
Brecon and Radnor	Dafydd Noel Gittins	2,300	5.2	4
Caernarfon	Dafydd Wigley	14,624	42.6	1
Caerphilly	Phil Williams	10,452	24.5	2
Cardiff North	P. Richards	1,464	4.6	4
Cardiff North West	Colin Palfrey	1,278	3.7	4
Cardiff South East	Keith Bush	983	2.4	4
Cardiff West	Dafydd Hughes	2,008	5.5	4
Cardiganshire	C. Davies	4,583	13.2	4
Carmarthen	Gwynfor Evans	23,325	45.1	1
Conway	M. Farmer	4,668	11.8	4
Denbigh	Ieuan Wyn Jones	5,754	11.9	4
East Flintshire	F. Evans	1,779	3.2	4
Ebbw Vale	G. Robert	2,101	7.3	4
Gower	M. Powell	4,369	10.0	4
Llanelli	R. Williams	6,797	13.7	3
Merioneth	Dafydd Elis-Thomas	9,543	42.5	1
Merthyr Tydfil	Emrys Roberts	4,455	14.8	2
Monmouth	T. Brimmacombe	839	1.4	4
Montgomeryshire	A. P. Jones	2,440	9.3	4
Neath	Huw Evans	7,305	17.9	2
Newport	G. Lee	1,216	2.1	4
Ogmore	D. I. Jones	4,290	8.4	4
Pembrokeshire	R. V. Davies	2,580	4.5	4
Pontypool	Roger Tanner	2,223	5.6	4
Pontypridd	Richard Anthony Kemp	3,917	7.6	4
Rhondda	D. Morgan	4,173	8.3	2
Swansea East	John Graham Ball	3,978	9.5	4
Swansea West	Guto ap Gwent	1,778	3.6	4
West Flintshire	Neil Taylor	2,306	4.8	4
Wrexham	H. W. Roberts	2,859	5.1	4

=== 1979 general election ===
Constituency	Candidate	Votes	%	Position
Aberavon	G. Thomas	1,954	3.8	4
Aberdare	Phil Richards	3,652	9.8	3
Abertillery	David Harries	2,248	7.9	3
Anglesey	John Lasarus Williams	7,863	20.3	3
Barry	John Dixon	1,281	2.1	4
Bedwellty	T. Richards	2,648	6.6	3
Brecon and Radnor	J. Power	1,031	2.2	4
Caernarfon	Dafydd Wigley	17,420	49.7	1
Caerphilly	Phil Williams	6,931	14.9	3
Cardiff North	Owen John Thomas	1,081	3.0	4
Cardiff North West	Colin Palfrey	743	2.1	4
Cardiff South East	Eric Roberts	628	1.6	3
Cardiff West	A. Ogwen	3,272	10.4	2
Cardiganshire	Dafydd Hughes	5,382	14.5	4
Carmarthen	Gwynfor Evans	16,689	32.0	2
Conway	Emyr Price	3,497	8.6	4
Denbigh	Ieuan Wyn Jones	4,915	9.3	4
East Flintshire	John Rogers	1,198	2.0	4
Ebbw Vale	G. ap Roberts	1,884	6.5	4
Gower	Eifion Thomas	3,357	7.2	4
Llanelli	Hywel Roberts	3,793	7.4	4
Merioneth	Dafydd Elis-Thomas	9,275	40.8	1
Merthyr Tydfil	Eurfyl ap Gwilym	2,962	9.4	3
Monmouth	G. Williams	641	1.0	4
Montgomeryshire	Carl Iwan Clowes	2,440	9.3	4
Neath	Aled Gwyn	6,430	15.3	3
Newport	Bob Vickery	473	0.8	4
Ogmore	D. I. Jones	2,450	4.4	4
Pembrokeshire	Ron Dawe	1,573	2.5	4
Pontypool	Bill Hyde	1,169	2.6	4
Pontypridd	Elfed Roberts	2,200	3.8	4
Rhondda	Glyn James	4,226	8.4	3
Swansea East	John Graham Ball	2,732	6.0	4
Swansea West	Guto ap Gwent	1,012	1.9	4
West Flintshire	B. M. Edwards	1,720	3.2	4
Wrexham	H. W. Roberts	1,740	2.8	4

=== By-elections 1979–1983 ===
Election	Candidate	Votes	%	Position
1982 Gower by-election	Ieuan Owen	3,431	8.7	4

=== 1983 general election ===
Constituency	Candidate	Votes	%	Position
Aberavon	Glenn Phillips	1,859	4.6	4
Alyn and Deeside	Alan Shore	413	0.9	4
Blaenau Gwent	Stephen Morgan	1,624	3.8	4
Brecon and Radnor	Sian Rosmari Meredudd	640	1.7	4
Bridgend	Keith Bush	1,312	3.2	4
Caernarfon	Dafydd Wigley	18,308	52.7	1
Caerphilly	Lindsay Whittle	6,414	13.6	4
Cardiff Central	Andrew Paul Morgan	704	1.8	4
Cardiff North	Dafydd Huws	974	2.4	4
Cardiff South and Penarth	Sian Anghared Edwards	673	1.6	4
Cardiff West	Meurig Parri	848	2.1	4
Carmarthen	Gwynfor Evans	14,099	27.1	3
Ceredigion and Pembroke North	Cynog Dafis	6,072	12.9	4
Clwyd North West	Manon Rhys	1,669	3.7	4
Clwyd South West	Toni Schiavone	3,684	8.6	4
Conwy	Dafydd Iwan	4,105	10.4	4
Cynon Valley	Pauline Jarman	3,421	9.3	4
Delyn	Haydn Huws	1,558	3.2	4
Gower	N. Williams	1,444	3.2	4
Islwyn	Aneurin Richards	1,574	4.0	4
Llanelli	Hywel Teifi Edwards	5,880	12.2	4
Meirionnydd Nant Conwy	Dafydd Elis-Thomas	9,709	39.2	1
Merthyr Tydfil and Rhymney	Gerald Howells	2,058	5.8	4
Monmouth	Gwynddri Williams	493	1.1	4
Montgomeryshire	Carl Iwan Clowes	1,585	5.3	4
Neath	Ieuan Owen	3,046	7.2	4
Newport East	David Thomas	697	1.7	4
Newport West	Denis Watkins	477	1.1	4
Ogmore	Ted Merriman	3,124	7.9	4
Pembrokeshire	Osi Rhys Osmond	1,073	2.0	4
Pontypridd	Janet Marion Davies	2,065	4.7	4
Rhondda	Geraint Rhys Davies	4,845	10.2	3
Swansea East	Clive Reid	1,531	3.7	4
Swansea West	Meirion Pennar	795	1.9	4
Torfaen	Phyllis Cox	896	2.1	4
Vale of Glamorgan	Andrew John Dixon	1,068	2.3	4
Wrexham	John Richard Thomas	1,239	2.6	4
Ynys Môn	Ieuan Wyn Jones	13,333	33.3	2

=== By-elections 1983–1987 ===
Election	Candidate	Votes	%	Position
1984 Cynon Valley by-election	Clayton Jones	3,619	11.0	3
1985 Brecon and Radnor by-election	Janet Marion Davies	435	1.1	4

=== 1987 general election ===
Constituency	Candidate	Votes	%	Position
Aberavon	Anne Louisa Howells	1,124	2.8	4
Alyn and Deeside	John Dudley Rogers	478	1.0	4
Blaenau Gwent	Stephen Morgan	1,621	3.8	4
Brecon and Radnor	John Hamilton Davies	535	1.3	4
Bridgend	Laura McAllister	1,065	2.3	4
Caernarfon	Dafydd Wigley	20,338	57.1	1
Caerphilly	Lindsay Whittle	3,955	8.1	4
Cardiff Central	Siân Mair Caiach	535	1.3	4
Cardiff North	Eluned Mary Bush	692	1.6	4
Cardiff South and Penarth	Sian Anghared Edwards	599	1.3	4
Cardiff West	Peter John Keelan	736	1.7	4
Carmarthen	Hywel Teifi Edwards	12,457	23.0	3
Ceredigion and Pembroke North	Cynog Dafis	7,848	16.3	4
Clwyd North West	Robert Karl Davies	1,966	4.0	4
Clwyd South West	Eifion Lloyd Jones	3,987	8.4	4
Conwy	Rhodri Davies	3,177	7.8	4
Cynon Valley	Dorothy Louise Richards	2,549	6.7	4
Delyn	David John Owen	1,329	2.5	4
Gower	Jonathan Gwyn Mendus Edwards	1,341	2.8	4
Islwyn	Aneurin Richards	1,932	4.8	4
Llanelli	Adam Price	5,088	10.2	4
Meirionnydd Nant Conwy	Dafydd Elis-Thomas	10,392	40.0	1
Merthyr Tydfil and Rhymney	Janet Marion Davies	2,085	4.7	4
Monmouth	Sian Rosmari Meredudd	363	0.8	4
Montgomeryshire	Carl Iwan Clowes	1,412	4.5	4
Neath	Huw John	2,792	6.4	4
Newport East	Gareth Butler	458	1.1	4
Newport West	Digby John Bevan	377	0.8	4
Ogmore	John Griffiths Jones	1,791	4.4	4
Pembrokeshire	Osi Rhys Osmond	1,119	2.0	4
Pontypridd	Delme Bowen	2,498	5.3	4
Rhondda	Geraint Rhys Davies	4,261	8.9	2
Swansea East	Clive Reid	1,145	2.7	4
Swansea West	Nigel Williams	902	2.0	4
Torfaen	Jill Evans	577	1.3	4
Vale of Glamorgan	Penri Gwyn Williams	946	1.8	4
Wrexham	Dennis Ronald Watkins	539	1.1	4
Ynys Môn	Ieuan Wyn Jones	18,580	43.2	1

=== By-elections 1987–1992 ===
Election	Candidate	Votes	%	Position
1989 Pontypridd by-election	Syd Morgan	9,775	25.3	2
1989 Vale of Glamorgan by-election	Andrew John Dixon	1,672	3.5	4
1991 Neath by-election	Dewi Evans	8,132	23.3	2
1991 Monmouth by-election	Melvin John Witherden	277	0.6	5

Witherden was a joint candidate with the Green Party of England and Wales.

=== 1992 general election ===
Constituency	Candidate	Votes	%	Position
Aberavon	David Saunders	1,919	4.8	4
Alyn and Deeside	John D. Rogers	551	1.1	4
Blaenau Gwent	Alun Davies	2,099	4.8	4
Brecon and Radnor	Sian Meredudd	418	0.9	4
Bridgend	Alun Lloyd Jones	1,301	2.8	4
Caernarfon	Dafydd Wigley	21,439	59.0	1
Caerphilly	Lindsay Whittle	4,821	9.7	3
Cardiff Central	Huw Marshall	748	1.7	4
Cardiff North	Eluned Mary Bush	916	1.9	4
Cardiff South and Penarth	Barbara Anglezarke	776	1.6	4
Cardiff West	Penni Bestic	1,177	2.6	4
Carmarthen	Rhodri Glyn Thomas	17,957	31.5	2
Ceredigion and Pembroke North	Cynog Dafis	16,020	31.3	1
Clwyd North West	Neil H. Taylor	1,888	3.6	4
Clwyd South West	Eifion Lloyd Jones	4,835	9.8	4
Conwy	Rhodri Davies	3,108	7.4	4
Cynon Valley	Geraint Benney	4,186	11.0	3
Delyn	Ashley J. Drake	1,414	2.6	4
Gower	Adam Price	1,658	2.8	4
Islwyn	Helen Mary Jones	1,636	3.9	4
Llanelli	Marc Phillips	7,878	15.6	3
Meirionnydd Nant Conwy	Elfyn Llwyd	11,608	44.0	1
Merthyr Tydfil and Rhymney	Alun Cox	2,704	6.1	4
Monmouth	Melvin Witherden	431	0.9	4
Montgomeryshire	Hugh Parsons	1,581	4.8	4
Neath	Dewi Evans	5,145	11.3	3
Newport East	Stephen Ainley	716	1.7	4
Newport West	Peter John Keelan	653	1.4	4
Ogmore	Laura McAllister	2,667	6.3	4
Pembrokeshire	Conrad Bryant	1,627	2.7	4
Pontypridd	Delme Bowen	4,448	9.1	3
Rhondda	Geraint Rhys Davies	5,427	11.8	2
Swansea East	Eleanor Bonner-Evans	1,607	3.6	4
Swansea West	David Lloyd	1,668	3.8	4
Torfaen	John Cox	1,210	2.6	4
Vale of Glamorgan	David Haswell	1,160	2.1	4
Wrexham	Gareth Wheatley	1,415	2.8	4
Ynys Môn	Ieuan Wyn Jones	15,984	37.1	1

=== By-elections 1992–1997 ===
Election	Candidate	Votes	%	Position
1995 Islwyn by-election	Jocelyn Davies	2,933	12.7	2

=== 1997 general election ===
Constituency	Candidate	Votes	%	Position
Aberavon	Philip Cockwell	2,088	5.8	4
Alyn and Deeside	Siw Hills	738	1.8	5
Blaenau Gwent	Jim Criddle	2,072	5.2	4
Brecon and Radnorshire	Steven Cornelius	622	1.5	5
Bridgend	Dennis Watkins	1,649	3.8	5
Caerphilly	Lindsay Whittle	4,383	9.7	3
Caernarfon	Dafydd Wigley	17,616	51.0	1
Cardiff Central	Wayne Vernon	1,504	3.6	5
Cardiff North	Colin Palfrey	1,201	2.5	4
Cardiff South and Penarth	David Haswell	1,356	3.2	5
Cardiff West	Gwenllian Carr	1,949	4.8	4
Carmarthen East and Dinefwr	Rhodri Glyn Thomas	14,457	34.6	2
Carmarthen West and South Pembrokeshire	Roy Llewellyn	5,402	12.7	3
Ceredigion	Cynog Dafis	16,728	41.6	1
Clwyd South	Gareth Williams	2,500	6.3	4
Clwyd West	Eryl Williams	5,421	13.5	3
Conwy	Rhodri Vaughan Davies	2,844	6.8	4
Cynon Valley	Alun Davies	3,552	10.6	2
Delyn	Ashley J. Drake	1,558	3.8	4
Gower	D. Elwyn Williams	2,226	5.1	4
Islwyn	Darren Jones	2,272	6.2	4
Llanelli	Marc Phillips	7,812	19.0	2
Meirionnydd Nant Conwy	Elfyn Llwyd	12,465	50.7	1
Merthyr Tydfil	Alun G. Cox	2,344	6.0	4
Monmouth	Alan Cotton	516	1.1	5
Montgomeryshire	Helen Mary Jones	1,608	5.0	4
Neath	Trefor Jones	3,344	8.1	3
Newport East	Christopher Holland	721	1.9	6
Newport West	Huw Jackson	648	1.6	5
Ogmore	John Rogers	2,679	7.0	4
Pontypridd	Owain Llewelyn	2,977	6.5	4
Preseli Pembrokeshire	Alun Lloyd Jones	2,683	6.3	4
Rhondda	Leanne Wood	5,450	13.4	2
Swansea East	Michelle Pooley	1,308	3.4	4
Swansea West	Dai Lloyd	2,675	6.6	4
Torfaen	Robert W. Gough	1,042	2.4	5
Vale of Clwyd	Gwyneth Kensler	2,301	5.9	4
Vale of Glamorgan	Melanie Corp	1,393	2.6	4
Wrexham	Kevin Plant	1,170	3.2	5
Ynys Môn	Ieuan Wyn Jones	15,756	39.5	1

=== By-elections 1997–2001 ===
Election	Candidate	Votes	%	Position
2000 Ceredigion by-election	Simon George Thomas	10,716	42.8	1

=== 2001 general election ===
Constituency	Candidate	Votes	%	Position
Aberavon	Lisa Turnbull	2,955	9.8	2
Alyn and Deeside	Richard Coombs	1,182	3.3	4
Blaenau Gwent	Adam John Rykala	3,542	11.2	2
Brecon and Radnorshire	Brynach Parri	1,301	3.5	4
Bridgend	Monica Emma Mahoney	2,653	7.2	4
Caerphilly	Lindsay Whittle	8,172	21.0	2
Caernarfon	Hywel Williams	12,894	44.4	1
Cardiff Central	Richard Rhys Grigg	1,680	4.8	4
Cardiff North	Sion Tomos Jobbins	2,471	5.7	4
Cardiff South and Penarth	Lila Eilis Maire Haines	1,983	5.5	4
Cardiff West	Delme Bowen	3,296	9.7	4
Carmarthen East and Dinefwr	Adam Robert Price	16,130	42.4	1
Carmarthen West and South Pembrokeshire	Llyr Huws Gruffydd	6,893	18.7	3
Ceredigion	Simon Thomas	13,241	38.3	1
Clwyd South	Dyfed Wyn Edwards	3,982	11.9	3
Clwyd West	Huw Elfed Williams	4,453	12.9	3
Conwy	Ann Owen	5,665	16.5	4
Cynon Valley	Steven J. Cornelius	4,687	17.4	2
Delyn	Paul John Rowlinson	2,262	6.5	4
Gower	Siân Mair Caiach	3,865	10.3	4
Islwyn	Leigh Thomas	3,767	11.9	3
Llanelli	Dyfan Rhys Jones	11,183	30.9	2
Meirionnydd Nant Conwy	Elfyn Llwyd	10,459	49.6	1
Merthyr Tydfil	Robert Hughes	4,651	14.7	2
Monmouth	Marc Hubbard	1,068	2.4	4
Montgomeryshire	David Senior	1,969	6.8	4
Neath	Alun Llewelyn	6,437	18.4	2
Newport East	Madoc Batcup	1,519	4.9	4
Newport West	Anthony Salkeld	2,510	7.2	4
Ogmore	Angela Pulman	4,259	14.0	2
Pontypridd	Bleddyn Hancock	5,279	13.8	2
Preseli Pembrokeshire	Rhys Sinnett	4,658	12.7	3
Rhondda	Leanne Wood	7,183	21.1	2
Swansea East	John Ball	3,464	11.5	4
Swansea West	Ian Titherington	3,404	10.6	4
Torfaen	Stephen Paul Smith	2,720	7.7	4
Vale of Clwyd	John Williams	2,300	7.1	4
Vale of Glamorgan	Chris Franks	2,867	6.3	4
Wrexham	Malcolm William Evans	1,783	5.9	4
Ynys Môn	Eilian Williams	11,106	32.6	2

=== By-elections 2001–2005 ===
Election	Candidate	Votes	%	Position
2002 Ogmore by-election	Bleddyn Hancock	3,827	20.8	2

=== 2005 general election ===
Constituency	Candidate	Votes	%	Position
Aberavon	Philip Evans	3,545	11.8	3
Alyn and Deeside	Richard Coombs	1,320	3.7	4
Blaenau Gwent	John Price	843	2.4	4
Brecon and Radnorshire	Mabon ap Gwynfor	1,404	3.7	4
Bridgend	Gareth Clubb	2,527	6.7	4
Caerphilly	Lindsay Whittle	6,831	17.4	2
Caernarfon	Hywel Williams	12,747	45.5	1
Cardiff Central	Richard Rhys Grigg	1,271	3.5	4
Cardiff North	John Rowlands	1,936	4.3	4
Cardiff South and Penarth	Jason Toby	2,023	5.5	4
Cardiff West	Neil McEvoy	4,316	12.5	4
Carmarthen East and Dinefwr	Adam Robert Price	17,561	45.9	1
Carmarthen West and South Pembrokeshire	John Dixon	5,582	14.7	3
Ceredigion	Simon Thomas	12,911	35.9	2
Clwyd South	Mark Strong	3,111	9.4	4
Clwyd West	Eilian Williams	3,874	10.9	4
Conwy	Paul Rowlinson	3,730	11.1	4
Cynon Valley	Geraint Benney	3,815	14.3	2
Delyn	Phil Thomas	2,524	7.4	4
Gower	Siân Mair Caiach	3,089	7.8	4
Islwyn	Jim Criddle	3,947	12.8	2
Llanelli	Neil Baker	9,358	26.5	2
Meirionnydd Nant Conwy	Elfyn Llwyd	10,597	51.3	1
Merthyr Tydfil	Noel Turner	2,972	9.9	4
Monmouth	Jonathan Clark	993	2.2	4
Montgomeryshire	Ellen ap Gwynn	2,078	6.9	4
Neath	Geraint Owen	6,125	17.1	2
Newport East	Mohammad Asghar	1,221	3.8	4
Newport West	Anthony Salkeld	1,278	3.6	4
Ogmore	John Williams	3,148	10.4	4
Pontypridd	Julie Richards	4,420	11.2	4
Preseli Pembrokeshire	Matt Mathias	4,752	12.3	4
Rhondda	Percy Jones	4,956	15.9	2
Swansea East	Carolyn Shan Couch	2,129	6.9	4
Swansea West	Harri Roberts	2,150	6.5	4
Torfaen	Aneurin Preece	2,242	6.2	4
Vale of Clwyd	Mark Jones	2,309	7.1	4
Vale of Glamorgan	Barry Shaw	2,423	5.1	4
Wrexham	Sion Owen	1,744	5.7	4
Ynys Môn	Eurig Wyn	11,036	31.1	2

=== By-elections 2005–2010 ===
Election	Candidate	Votes	%	Position
2006 Blaenau Gwent by-election	Steffan Lewis	1,755	6.5	3

=== 2010 general election ===
Constituency	Candidate	Votes	%	Position
Aberavon	Paul Nicholls-Jones	2,198	7.1	4
Aberconwy	Phil Edwards	5,341	17.8	4
Alyn and Deeside	Maurice Jones	1,549	3.9	4
Arfon	Hywel Williams	9,383	36.0	1
Blaenau Gwent	Rhodri Davies	1,333	4.1	5
Brecon and Radnorshire	Janet Davies	989	2.5	4
Bridgend	Nicholas Thomas	2,269	5.9	4
Caerphilly	Lindsay Whittle	6,460	16.7	3
Cardiff Central	Chris Williams	1,246	3.4	4
Cardiff North	Llewelyn Rhys	1,588	3.3	4
Cardiff South and Penarth	Farida Aslam	1,851	4.2	4
Cardiff West	Mohammad Sarul Islam	2,868	7.0	4
Carmarthen East and Dinefwr	Jonathan Edwards	13,546	35.6	1
Carmarthen West and South Pembrokeshire	John Dixon	4,232	10.4	4
Ceredigion	Penri James	10,815	28.3	2
Clwyd South	Janet Ryder	3,009	8.7	4
Clwyd West	Llyr Huws Gruffydd	5,864	15.4	3
Cynon Valley	Dafydd Trystan Davies	6,064	20.3	2
Delyn	Peter Ryder	1,844	5.0	4
Dwyfor Meirionydd	Elfyn Llwyd	12,814	44.3	1
Gower	Darren Price	2,760	6.6	4
Islwyn	Steffan Lewis	4,518	13.0	3
Llanelli	Myfanwy Davies	11,215	29.9	2
Merthyr Tydfil	Glyndwr Jones	1,621	5.1	5
Monmouth	Jonathan Clark	1,273	2.7	4
Montgomeryshire	Heledd Fychan	2,802	8.3	3
Neath	Alun Llewelyn	7,397	19.9	2
Newport East	Fiona Cross	724	2.1	5
Newport West	Jeff Rees	1,122	2.8	6
Ogmore	Danny Clark	3,326	9.6	4
Pontypridd	Ioan Bellin	2,673	7.3	4
Preseli Pembrokeshire	Henry Jones-Davies	3,654	9.2	4
Rhondda	Geraint Davies	5,630	18.1	2
Swansea East	Dic Jones	2,181	6.7	4
Swansea West	Harri Roberts	1,437	4.0	4
Torfaen	Rhys ab Elis	2,005	5.3	4
Vale of Clwyd	Caryl Wyn-Jones	2,068	5.8	4
Vale of Glamorgan	Ian James Johnson	2,667	5.5	4
Wrexham	Arfon Jones	2,029	6.2	4
Ynys Môn	Dylan Rees	9,029	26.2	2

=== By-elections 2010–2015 ===
Election	Candidate	Votes	%	Position
2012 Cardiff South and Penarth by-election	Luke Nicholas	1,854	9.5	4

=== 2015 general election ===
Constituency	Candidate	Votes	%	Position
Aberavon	Duncan Higgitt	3,663	11.6	4
Aberconwy	Dafydd Meurig	3,536	11.7	3
Alyn and Deeside	Jacqueline Ann Hurst	1,608	3.9	5
Arfon	Hywel Williams	11,790	43.9	1
Blaenau Gwent	Steffan Lewis	2,849	9.0	4
Brecon and Radnorshire	Freddy Greaves	1,767	4.4	5
Bridgend	James Christopher Radcliffe	2,784	7.1	4
Caerphilly	Beci Newton	5,895	14.6	4
Cardiff Central	Martin Pollard	1,925	5.0	6
Cardiff North	Elin Walker Jones	2,301	4.5	4
Cardiff South and Penarth	Ben Foday	3,433	7.4	4
Cardiff West	Neil McEvoy	6,096	13.9	3
Carmarthen East and Dinefwr	Jonathan Edwards	15,140	38.4	1
Carmarthen West and South Pembrokeshire	Elwyn Williams	4,201	10.4	4
Ceredigion	Mike Parker	10,347	27.7	2
Clwyd South	Mabon ap Gwynfor	3,620	10.3	4
Clwyd West	Marc Jones	4,651	12.2	4
Cynon Valley	Cerith Griffiths	5,126	16.8	2
Delyn	Paul Rowlinson	1,803	4.8	4
Dwyfor Meirionydd	Liz Saville-Roberts	11,811	40.9	1
Gower	Darren Thomas	3,051	7.1	4
Islwyn	Lyn Ackerman	3,794	10.7	4
Llanelli	Vaughan Williams	8,853	23.0	2
Merthyr Tydfil	Rhayna Pritchard	3,099	9.5	4
Monmouth	Jonathan Clark	1,875	3.9	5
Montgomeryshire	Ann Griffith	1,745	5.2	5
Neath	Daniel Thomas	6,722	18.1	2
Newport East	Tony Salkeld	1,231	3.5	5
Newport West	Simon Coopey	1,604	4.0	4
Ogmore	Tim Thomas	3,556	10.1	4
Pontypridd	Osian Lewis	4,348	11.5	5
Preseli Pembrokeshire	John Osmond	2,518	6.2	5
Rhondda	Shelley Rees-Owen	8,521	27.0	2
Swansea East	Dic Jones	3,498	10.4	4
Swansea West	Harri Roberts	2,266	6.4	5
Torfaen	Boydd Hackley-Green	2,169	5.7	4
Vale of Clwyd	Mair Rowlands	2,486	7.1	4
Vale of Glamorgan	Ian James Johnson	2,869	5.6	4
Wrexham	Carrie Harper	2,501	7.6	4
Ynys Môn	John Rowlands	10,642	30.5	2

=== By-elections 2015–2017 ===
Election	Candidate	Votes	%	Position
2016 Ogmore by-election	Abi Thomas	3,683	15.7	3

=== 2017 general election ===
Constituency	Candidate	Votes	%	Position
Aberavon	Andrew Bennison	2,761	8.3	3
Aberconwy	Wyn Elis Jones	3,170	9.9	3
Alyn and Deeside	Jacqueline Ann Hurst	1,171	2.6	3
Arfon	Hywel Williams	11,519	40.8	1
Blaenau Gwent	Nigel Copner	6,880	21.2	2
Brecon and Radnorshire	Kate Heneghan	1,299	3.1	4
Bridgend	Rhys Watkins	1,783	4.1	3
Caerphilly	Lindsay Whittle	5,962	14.4	3
Cardiff Central	Mark Hooper	999	2.5	4
Cardiff North	Steffan Webb	1,738	3.3	3
Cardiff South and Penarth	Ian Titherington	2,162	4.3	3
Cardiff West	Michael Deem	4,418	9.5	3
Carmarthen East and Dinefwr	Jonathan Edwards	16,127	39.3	1
Carmarthen West and South Pembrokeshire	Abi Thomas	3,933	9.3	3
Ceredigion	Ben Lake	11,623	29.2	1
Clwyd South	Christopher Allen	2,292	6.1	3
Clwyd West	Dilwyn Roberts	3,918	9.6	3
Cynon Valley	Liz Walters	4,376	13.8	3
Delyn	Paul Rowlinson	1,481	3.8	3
Dwyfor Meirionydd	Liz Saville-Roberts	13,687	45.1	1
Gower	Harri Roberts	1,669	3.7	3
Islwyn	Darren Jones	2,739	7.6	3
Llanelli	Mari Arthur	7,351	18.2	3
Merthyr Tydfil and Rhymney	Amy Kitcher	2,740	8.2	3
Monmouth	Carole Damon	1,338	2.7	4
Montgomeryshire	Aled Hughes	1,960	5.6	4
Neath	Daniel Williams	5,339	13.9	3
Newport East	Cameron Wixcey	881	2.4	5
Newport West	Morgan Bowler-Brown	1,077	2.5	4
Ogmore	Huw Marshall	2,796	7.5	3
Pontypridd	Fflur Elin	4,102	10.3	3
Preseli Pembrokeshire	Owain Llŷr Williams	2,711	6.4	3
Rhondda	Branwen Cennard	7,350	22.3	2
Swansea East	Steffan Phillips	1,689	4.8	3
Swansea West	Rhydian Fitter	1,529	4.1	3
Torfaen	Jeff Rees	2,059	5.4	3
Vale of Clwyd	David Wyatt	1,551	4.0	3
Vale of Glamorgan	Ian Johnson	2,295	4.3	3
Wrexham	Carrie Harper	1,753	5.0	3
Ynys Môn	Ieuan Wyn Jones	10,237	27.4	3

=== By-elections 2017–2019 ===
Election	Candidate	Votes	%	Position
2019 Newport West by-election	Jonathan Clarke	1,185	5.0	4

=== 2019 general election ===
Constituency	Candidate	Votes	%	Position
Aberavon	Nigel Hunt	2,711	8.6	4
Aberconwy	Lisa Goodier	2,704	8.5	3
Alyn and Deeside	Susan Hills	1,453	3.4	5
Arfon	Hywel Williams	13,134	45.2	1
Blaenau Gwent	Peredur Owen Griffiths	1,722	5.7	4
Bridgend	Leanne Lewis	2,013	4.8	4
Caerphilly	Lindsay Whittle	6,424	16.0	3
Cardiff North	Rhys Taylor	3,580	6.8	3
Cardiff South and Penarth	Nasir Adam	2,386	4.7	4
Cardiff West	Boyd Clack	3,864	8.4	3
Carmarthen East and Dinefwr	Jonathan Edwards	15,939	38.9	1
Carmarthen West and South Pembrokeshire	Rhys Thomas	3,633	8.6	3
Ceredigion	Ben Lake	15,208	37.9	1
Clwyd South	Christopher Allen	2,137	5.9	3
Clwyd West	Elfed Williams	3,907	9.7	3
Cynon Valley	Geraint Benney	2,562	8.5	4
Delyn	Paul Rowlinson	1,406	3.7	5
Dwyfor Meirionydd	Liz Saville-Roberts	14,447	48.3	1
Gower	John Davies	2,288	5.1	3
Islwyn	Zoe Hammond	2,287	6.7	4
Llanelli	Mari Arthur	7,048	18.4	3
Merthyr Tydfil and Rhymney	Mark Evans	2,449	7.6	4
Monmouth	Hugh Kocan	1,182	2.4	5
Neath	Daniel Williams	4,495	12.2	3
Newport East	Cameron Wixcey	872	2.4	5
Newport West	Morgan Bowler-Brown	1,187	2.7	5
Ogmore	Luke Fletcher	2,919	8.3	4
Pontypridd	Fflur Elin	4,990	12.8	3
Preseli Pembrokeshire	Cris Tomos	2,776	6.5	3
Rhondda	Branwen Cennard	4,069	13.7	3
Swansea East	Geraint Havard	1,907	5.7	4
Swansea West	Gwyn Williams	1,984	5.5	4
Torfaen	Morgan Bowler-Brown	1,441	3.9	4
Vale of Clwyd	Glenn Swingler	1,552	4.2	3
Wrexham	Carrie Harper	2,151	6.4	3
Ynys Môn	Aled ap Dafydd	10,418	28.5	3

=== 2024 general election ===
Constituency	Candidate	Votes	%	Position
Aberafan Maesteg	Colin Deere	4,719	13.2	3
Alyn and Deeside	Jack Morris	1,938	4.5	5
Bangor Aberconwy	Catrin Wager	9,112	21.9	2
Blaenau Gwent and Rhymney	Niamh Salkeld	3,844	12.8	2
Brecon, Radnor and Cwm Tawe	Emily Durrant-Munro	2,280	4.9	5
Bridgend	Iolo Caudy	3,629	8.8	4
Caerfyrddin	Ann Davies	15,520	34.0	1
Caerphilly	Lindsay Whittle	8,119	21.2	2
Cardiff East	Cadewyn Skelley	3,550	9.1	6
Cardiff North	Malcolm Phillips	4,669	9.8	4
Cardiff South and Penarth	withdrew support from their nominated candidate	3,227	8.2	5
Cardiff West	Kiera Marshall	9,423	21.1	2
Ceredigion Preseli	Ben Lake	21,738	46.9	1
Clwyd East	Paul Penlington	3,733	7.8	4
Clwyd North	Paul Rowlinson	3,159	7.6	4
Dwyfor Meirionnydd	Liz Saville Roberts	21,788	53.9	1
Gower	Kieran Pritchard	3,942	8.3	4
Llanelli	Rhodri Davies	9,511	23.3	3
Merthyr Tydfil and Aberdare	Francis Whitefoot	4,768	13.5	3
Mid and South Pembrokeshire	Cris Tomos	2,962	6.4	4
Monmouthshire	Ioan Bellin	1,273	2.5	6
Montgomeryshire and Glyndŵr	Elwyn Vaughan	5,667	13.1	5
Neath and Swansea East	Andrew Jenkins	5,350	13.3	3
Newport East	Jonathan Clark	2,239	5.8	4
Newport West and Islwyn	Brandon Ham	3,529	8.4	4
Pontypridd	Wil Rees	5,275	13.4	3
Rhondda and Ogmore	Owen Cutler	5,198	14.5	3
Swansea West	Gwyn Williams	4,105	11.5	4
Torfaen	Matthew Jones	2,571	7.2	4
Vale of Glamorgan	Ian Johnson	3,245	7.1	4
Wrexham	Becca Martin	4,138	10.2	4
Ynys Môn	Llinos Medi	10,590	32.5	1
