= Bobi Jones =

Welsh academic (1929–2017)

Robert Maynard Jones (20 May 1929 – 22 November 2017), generally known as Bobi Jones, was a Welsh Christian academic and one of the most prolific writers in the history of the Welsh language. A versatile master of poetry, fictional prose and criticism, he was born in Cardiff in 1929, educated at the University of Wales, Cardiff (now Cardiff University) and University College Dublin. Jones held the chair in Welsh language at Aberystwyth from 1980 until his retirement. He died on 22 November 2017.

== Author ==
"Bobi Jones is an author of great significance, not least for non-Welsh speakers. Himself having learnt Welsh, his work offers an insight, more so than the work of most authors whose first language is Welsh, into the significance of Welsh language and culture, particularly because of the strong intellectual or reflective element in his work. Deeply involved with the language and its culture, passionately committed to the best things in Welsh life, there is in his work - even at moments of high intensity - an element of detachment, an ability to step aside and see the wonder of Wales, its beauty and its tragedy, with an outsider's reflective, almost analytical gaze." – John Emyr

== Christian ==
Bobi Jones was a Christian leaning firmly to Calvinism. He attended a denominational chapel in Aberystwyth until 1970 when he joined a Welsh Evangelical Church which had been established in the town a few years earlier. He therefore followed a trend among Evangelicals of the time in leaving the old Christian denominations (see also Evangelical Movement of Wales and Dr Martyn Lloyd-Jones), on finding that evangelical churches best suited his reformed theology. He had a regular column in the Welsh-language magazine of the Evangelical Movement of Wales, Y Cylchgrawn Efengylaidd, discussing the Christian heritage of Welsh literature.

== Welshman ==
Jones was a Welsh nationalist and a strong supporter of the Welsh language. He would argue that culture and the nation are ordained of God and that therefore sustaining their existence is a form of praise to God. His ideas on nationalism and on politics in general are best put forward in his book Crist a Chenedlaetholdeb (Christ and Nationalism), published in 1994.

His view on sustaining the Welsh language and his contribution to it are unique. Many Welsh scholars such as R Tudur Jones contributed through support for pressure groups such as Cymdeithas yr Iaith Gymraeg. Jones was a supporter of such campaigns, but his major contribution to promoting the language was in teaching Welsh to adults.

Having learnt Welsh himself, he held that the key to restoring the Welsh language was to win over the non-Welsh speakers of Wales, as opposed to putting all the energy into campaigning for the rights of existing Welsh speakers. He felt that in addition to protesting over their rights to the government, Welsh speakers should themselves act positively. In adult teaching, he was the founder of CYD: Cymdeithas y Dysgwyr (Learners' Society), which arranges night classes in Welsh throughout Wales, and remained its honorary President until his death. Though a republican in his views, he taught Welsh to King Charles III when the latter attended the University of Wales, Aberystwyth, in the summer of 1969, leading up to his investiture as Prince of Wales.

== Works ==
- Y Gân Gyntaf (1957)
- Nid yw Dwr yn Plygu (1958)
- I'r Arch (1959)
- Bod yn Wraig (1960)
- Rhwng Taf a Thaf (1960)
- Y Tair Rhamant (1960)
- Lenyddiaeth Saesneg yn Addysg Cymru (1961)
- Emile (1963)
- Cyflwyno'r Gymraeg (1964)
- System in Child Language (1964)
- Tyred Allan (1965)
- Man Gwyn (1965)
- Cymraeg i Oedolion (1965–1966)
- Y Dyn Na Ddaeth Adref (1966)
- Yr Wyl Ifori (1967)
- Ci Wrth y Drws (1968)
- Daw'r Pasg i Bawb (1969)
- Highlights in Welsh Literature (1969)
- Pedwar Emynydd (1970)
- Allor Wydn (1971)
- Sioc o'r Gofod (1971)
- Traed Prydferth (1973)
- Tafod y Llenor (1974)
- Ysgrifennu Creadigal i Fyfyrwyr Prifysgol (1974)
- Cyfeiriadur i'r Athro Iaith (co-author) (3 vol. (1974–1979)
- Llenyddiaeth Cymru (1975)
- Gwlad Llun (1976)
- Ann Griffiths: y Cyfrinydd Sylweddol (1977)
- Llên Cymru a Chrefydd (1977)
- Pwy Laddodd Miss Wales? (1977)
- 'Narrative Structure in Medieval Welsh Prose Tales' (1983)
- "Selected poems" (1987)
- "Ysbryd y cwlwm" (1998)
- "Ynghylch tawelwch" (1998)
- "Tair rhamant Arthuraidd" (1998)
- "Rhy iach" (2004)
- "Y Fadarchen Hudol" (2005)
- "Meddwl y Gynghanedd" (2005)

== Sources ==
Notes

Bibliography

- Jones, Bobi: "Gweld gwerth" in magazine Taliesin
- Jones, Bobi: "Language regained"
- Emyr, John: "Bobi Jones": 75th volume in the Writers of Wales series published on behalf of the Welsh Arts Council

== See also ==
- R. Geraint Gruffydd
