= Clì Gàidhlig =

Scottish organisation

- Clì Gàidhlig logo
- Formation: 1984
- Type: Non-governmental organization
- Legal status: Charity
- Purpose: Promotion of Scottish Gaelic
- Headquarters: Inverness
- Location: Scotland
- Coordinates: 57°28′46″N 4°13′27″W
- Convenor: Pam Talbot
- Director: DJ MacIntyre
- Main organ: board of directors
- Staff: 6

Clì Gàidhlig (Scottish Gaelic pronunciation: [ˈkʰliː ˈkaːlɪkʲ]), founded in 1984 as Comann an Luchd-Ionnsachaidh ([ˈkʰomən̪ˠ ə l̪ˠuxˈkʲũːn̪ˠs̪əxɪ]; "the Learners' Society"), was an organisation based in Inverness which sought to support learners of the Scottish Gaelic language and campaigned actively to promote the language.

Clì organised classes ranging from "coffee mornings" and one-day conversation courses to Ùlpan and grammar courses throughout Scotland. It also produced materials for learners, including the quarterly magazine Cothrom (the name means "a chance" in Gaelic).

Clì was also mentioned in news as lobbying to make the BBC Alba TV channel available on Freeview. One of its members was Alasdair Allan, MSP, who served as the Scottish Government's Minister for Learning, Science and Scotland's Languages.

In 2016, Bòrd na Gàidhlig cut Clì out of its budget, and as a result, the organisation voted to fold on 12 November 2016.

== See also ==
- Gaelic Medium Education
