= Dewi Evans =

British consultant paediatrician and medical expert witness (born 1949)

Doctor Dewi Evans FRCP FRCPCH FRSM
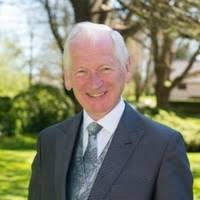
- Dewi Evans
- Born: Dewi Richard Evans; 1949 (age 76–77); Carmarthen, Wales
- Education: Queen Elizabeth Grammar School Carmarthen, Cardiff University School of Medicine
- Occupations: Consultant paediatrician (retired) (1980 - 2009), independent medical witness (1988 - 2023)
- Years active: 1973 - 2023
- Known for: Clinical Director of Paediatrics and Neonatology at the Singleton Hospital in Swansea
- Medical career
- Profession: Consultant paediatrician
- Field: Paediatrics
- Institutions: University Hospital of Wales, Alder Hey Children's Hospital, Morriston Hospital, Singleton Hospital, Bwrdd lechyd Prifyshgol Bae Aberawe and GIG Cymru
- Research: Paediatric endocrinology, childhood diabetes

Dewi Richard Evans (born July 1949) is a retired British consultant paediatrician and independent medical expert witness, whose role as lead independent expert medical witness for the prosecution in the Lucy Letby trial brought him to mainstream public attention. He earned a Bachelor of Medicine, Bachelor of Surgery (MB, BCh) from Cardiff University, a Diploma of the Royal College of Obstetricians and Gynaecologists, and became a Member of the Royal College of Physicians (1975). He was awarded Fellowship of the Royal College of Physicians in 1992, and in 1997 awarded a Fellowship of the Royal College of Paediatrics and Child Health in recognition of his work.

Within the medical community, he is known for his role as Clinical Director of Paediatrics and Neonatology at the Singleton Hospital in Swansea, and his role in the development of neonatal intensive care services and maternity services during the 1980s and 1990s in Wales.

Evans has campaigned for better funding and improvement of pediatric, neonatal, and maternity services in Swansea and across Wales, including public support for a Welsh registry of child abuse victims.

== Early life and education ==
Evans was bought up as a native Welsh speaker, in a traditional dairy farming family, as one of two children. He attended a local primary school, moving on to Queen Elizabeth Grammar School Carmarthen where he was fast-tracked through his O-Levels and A-Levels, graduating at 16.

Having successfully applied to Cardiff University School of Medicine, he began his medical training at the age of 17, "too young" in his own view. He graduated with a Bachelor of Medicine, Bachelor of Surgery (MB, BCh) in 1971. Upon graduation, he was able to secure junior training in adult medicine at Morriston Hospital, followed by surgery and obstetrics, and eventually paediatrics.

He secured a postgraduate job at Ysbyty Athrofaol Cymru, after which he worked at Alder Hey Children's Hospital, before returning to Cardiff to earn his Diploma of the Royal College of Obstetricians and Gynaecologists (DobstRCOG) in 1973, and Membership of the Royal College of Physicians (MRCP) in 1975, enabling him to apply for consultant positions. He was made a Fellow of the Royal College of Physicians (FRCP) in 1992, recognising his achievements in the field and in 1997 he was awarded a Fellowship of the Royal College of Paediatrics and Child Health (FRCPCH) in further recognition of his work.

He secured a consultant post at the Singleton hospital at the age of 30.

== Career ==
=== Junior doctor ===
After graduation 1973, Evans began working as a junior doctor at Ysbyty Athrofaol Cymru, his training took him to Alder Hey Children's Hospital as a registrar (1974–1976), and back to Cardiff (1977–1979), as a senior registrar, to complete his training.

=== Consultant paediatrician ===
From 1980 to 2009, he held the post of full-time clinical consultant paediatrician at the Morriston and Singleton Hospitals in Swansea, both managed by Bwrdd lechyd Prifyshgol Bae Aberawe and part of GIG Cymru, where he led the development of neonatal intensive care services and maternity services.

In interviews, he has said that during his years as a junior doctor he realised care for neonatal babies was "pretty poor", babies who were "born prematurely or born ill, tended to die, and there wasn’t the experience, the expertise, the equipment, the knowledge to do a lot about this." he found the state of the service in Wales and the country as whole very similar. As a result, he, along with fellow doctors and nursing colleagues, set about growing the neonatal unit until they became a nationally recognised neonate care facility in around 1990 and moved from Morriston to a purpose built facility at the Singleton Hospital.

=== Clinical director of paediatrics and neonatology ===
Evans served two spells as Clinical Director of Paediatrics and Neonatology at the Singleton Hospital (1992–1997) and (2004–2008). His areas of special interest included paediatric endocrinology and childhood diabetes.

Evans retired from Bwrdd lechyd Prifyshgol Bae Aberawe and GIG Cymru in 2009 after 29 years as a consultant, and 36 years as a doctor.

=== Independent medical witness ===
He describes his entry into the medico-legal world as being "purely by chance". Around 1988 a colleague from Northern Ireland, Brian Gibbons, sought advice on behalf of a family suing their local hospital after professional negligence caused one of their twin babies to be born dead, and the second with cerebral palsy and quadriplegia. The case, Dunne v National Maternity Hospital, was influential on Irish tort law as it laid out the six core rules for assessing medical negligence; these became known as "Dunne principles".

After a drawn-out process of "trial by ambush", as the solicitors for the plaintiff described it, they were able to win a substantial settlement for the family. Following this case, as word of mouth spread, Evans found himself on the register of expert witnesses, and in demand. He ultimately "prepared more than 500 medico-legal reports", for the courts, and has given evidence in court in all three of the United Kingdom's legal systems. In addition he has provided evidence to a number of public inquiries including the Inquiry into Hyponatraemia-related Deaths, and appeared regularly in the civil and criminal courts for both the defence and prosecution during the following four decades.

In interviews, Evans described his medico-legal practice as having three kinds of cases:-

Most of my cases during my substantive clinical practice involved allegations of clinical negligence, where I acted mainly for the claimant. I have prepared numerous cases for the family court, where one functions as a 'joint expert' acting for all the participants; local authority, guardian for the child, and representatives for the parents, and be independent of all of them. My third group of cases involves preparing reports involving suspected criminal activity. I have been involved in numerous cases where I have acted for the prosecution (via the police) and for the Defence approximately 50% each.

Following his 2009 retirement from Bwrdd lechyd Prifyshgol Bae Aberawe and GIG Cymru Evans continued to appear in various legal settings across the United Kingdom as an independent medical witness, joining the National Crime Agency register of expert witnesses around 2014. Many of his cases, as they had during his medical career, involved child abuse, murder, clinical negligence, and professional negligence.

In February 2023, he stopped taking new cases. This was almost 50 years after obtaining his first post in paediatrics. He considers his first and last cases to have been his most challenging.

== Cases as an expert witness ==
=== Lucy Letby ===
In 2017, during the police investigation into the Lucy Letby case, Evans was instructed to review clinical records of the babies in the unit who had died or collapsed suddenly and unexpectedly – in total 61 cases. Evans produced numerous reports for Cheshire Police including a general statement dated 17 April 2019, a review of published literature regarding air embolus in newborn infants dated 3 July 2019 and a series of reports concerning the events surrounding the deaths and unexpected collapses of babies.

Letby's trial opened on 10 October 2022 and Evans remained lead expert witness during the ten-month proceedings, which are thought to be the longest murder trial in British history. Supporting expert testimony was delivered by consultant pathologist Andreas Marnerides, professors of radiology Owen Arthurs and Stavros Stivaros, professor of haematology Sally Kinsey, professor of endocrinology Peter Hindmarsh, and consultant paediatrician Simon Kenney.

Evans' conclusions were peer-reviewed by Sandie Bohin a practising consultant neonatologist from Guernsey, at the request of Cheshire Police. Her role, was to "to provide a robust clinical review of Evans’ opinions, setting out whether she agreed or disagreed with him and, as appropriate, to provide an alternative causation for the collapse". Bohin also appeared as a main witness for the prosecution at the trial. An additional peer-reviewer, consultant neonatologist Martin Ward Platt, had been part of the early case but died three years before the trial commenced.

The case, Evans' written evidence, and his role as a key expert witness has generated public controversy despite the fact that Mr Justice Goss, and the Court of Appeal affirmed his credibility as a doctor and witness. Critics include retired general practitioner and opinion columnist Phil Hammond, retired neonatologist Shoo Lee, and Sir David Davis. Some parents of the deceased children have reacted with anger to their criticisms and perceived grandstanding.

Motion to rule further evidence inadmissible

On 9 January 2023, Ben Myers KC filed a motion to have further evidence from Evans ruled inadmissible before the defence commenced its case, in contravention of Criminal Practice Direction 2023 point 7 which requires such matters to be dealt with before the trial commences. The matter was also subject to 'Count 1' of the appeal. In the final appeal judgement Dame Victoria Sharp et alia notes (paragraphs 111–122,), in support of Justice James Goss original ruling:-

With respect to Mr Myers, it is unarguably the case that Dr Evans was suitably qualified - or to put it another way, it is not arguable that he lacked the necessary expertise - to give evidence. That is the case whether one examines his professional qualifications and background, or the evidence he gave about this during the course of the trial.

This tends to suggest that the real bone of contention was not Dr Evans' qualifications or competence per se (matters that otherwise could and should have been addressed pre-trial) but concerned the way in which he gave his evidence [emphasis from source]. ... It was also material that there was other expert evidence which supported Dr Evans' conclusions (indeed as the prosecution asserted, almost all of Dr Evans' opinions were corroborated by another expert).

The basis of the motion was that in 2022, Evans wrote a letter to the firm of solicitors involved in a civil appeal in the family court, being heard before Lord Justice Jackson. While not being a formal expert report or witness statement, the solicitors offered the text as evidence in an application for permission to appeal without Evans "knowledge or consent", Jackson found the text offered "worthless".

Dame Victoria Sharp et alia also noted that Evans' purported evidence in the case overseen by Lord Justice Jackson had been misrepresented:

We should note finally, that after the judge's ruling of 10 January 2023, Evans was asked about the observations of Jackson LJ in cross-examination. The effect of Evans's evidence, and we summarise, was that the criticisms made in the decision were based on a false premise. The report was not an expert report prepared for the court or a witness statement; rather, it was a letter to the solicitors in the care case, and had been used by the solicitors (for the purposes of the application for permission to appeal) without his knowledge or consent. Further, he had not known of the decision before it was brought to his attention by the prosecution. Everyone in this trial (i.e. that of the applicant) had seen the decision before he did.

In a November 2024 podcast interview with John Sweeney, Evans stated that he "disagreed" with Lord Justice Jackson's comments and thought he was "wrong to have made them".

Allegations by Lucy Letby's barrister

In December 2024, after the final appeal had been issued and the judicial case permanently closed, Lucy Letby's barrister Mark McDonald, while conducting a press conference, claimed that "Remarkably, Evans has now changed his mind on the cause of death of three of the babies: Baby C, Baby I and Baby P." further claiming that this was contained in a report delivered to police, and "despite numerous requests" [that the prosecution had] "yet to give this report to the defence". He went on to claim he would seek to appeal Letby's convictions on the grounds that the expert evidence was flawed. Evans responded by stating: "Mark McDonald's observations regarding my evidence is unsubstantiated, unfounded, inaccurate. His method of presenting his information reflects clear prejudice and bias. I find his style most unedifying, most unprofessional. It's highly disrespectful to the families of babies murdered and harmed by Lucy Letby."

The Crown Prosecution Service (CPS) said the Court of Appeal had previously rejected Letby's argument that expert witness evidence presented by the prosecution had been "flawed". Evans described the allegation as "remarkable, baseless, and incorrect".

=== Dunne v National Maternity Hospital ===
Dunne v National Maternity Hospital was a legal case from Ireland, heard in the Supreme Court of Ireland in Dublin.

Catherine Dunne presented to the National Maternity Hospital on 20 March 1982; she was pregnant with twins, and had gone into labour two weeks ahead of her estimated date of delivery. It was the routine practice in that hospital at the time to only monitor the heart rate of one of the two twins during labour in a multiple pregnancy, on the assumption that one twin's heart beat was a reliable proxy for the other. The first twin was born naturally six hours after Dunne arrived at the hospital, but shortly afterwards the second twin was born dead with signs of skin maceration. Over subsequent days, it became clear that the first twin had sustained severe brain damage, resulting in an irreversible quadriplegia and mental handicap.

The case had a significant influence on Irish tort law, in that it laid down the six core rules for assessing medical negligence. This was also the first case in which Evans' provided medico-legal evidence.

=== Reggie Phillips death ===
Evans was an expert witness in the 2018 murder trial of Doulton Phillips and Alannah Skinner. Medical experts, including Evans, were able to identify 53 separate injuries to the young child along with a pattern of abuse in the days leading up to the boy's death. Evans told the court "he thought the injuries pointed to Reggie being “hurled by the leg” and his head “smashed against a hard surface” shortly before dying." Phillips was convicted and sentenced to 15 years for murder, and Skinner 30 months for neglect.

The widely reported case led to a review of child safeguarding practices in Southampton.

=== Death of Lindsay Angela Alvarez ===
In 2009, Lindsay Angela Alvarez from Dundonald, County Down was admitted to hospital with brain swelling. She later died from the complications of Hypernatremia. An Inquest into the death was held in 2014. Dr Duncan Coulthard, a sodium expert, told the inquest he believed the girl had been forced to eat between five and seven teaspoons of salt; equivalent to the amount in 10 hamburgers. He said, "I can't accept the possibility she took it voluntarily."

Evans was called as an expert witness and stated to the inquest that it was unusual for a child to get fractured ribs and that he couldn't rule out that she might have been thrown down the stairs, he added, he would have expected other injuries "such as a cut lip, a fractured wrist and bruising to the shoulder" from an accidental fall. The inquest had previously been told that the child had fallen down carpeted stairs in her uncle's flat two weeks prior to her death. The inquest was halted, and a report was sent to Public Prosecution Service because the coroner suspected a crime had been committed, based on the evidence presented to the inquest.

The Public Prosecution Service ruled out criminal prosecution in 2015 because a clear suspect could not be identified, and the inquest was brought to a close despite the concerns of many involved.

=== Appeal in the removal of children from parental care ===
In 2015, the High Court of Appeal, Northern Ireland heard an appeal relating to the Family Court where two children had been judged to have been the subject of non-accidental injury in Care Proceedings and removed from the care of their parents. Evans had been one of the expert witnesses. The appeal was upheld.

=== Death of a five-month-old baby ===
Evans was an expert witness in the 2021 murder trial of a man later convicted of killing his five-month-old daughter, being able to rule out pneumonia as a potential cause of death in favour of a blunt force brain injury.

=== Lucy Rebecca Crawford death ===
On April 12, 2000 17-month-old Lucy Crawford was admitted to Erne Hospital with vomiting and dehydration, after being placed on a drip she suffered a seizure, was placed in intensive care, and then transferred to the Royal Victoria Hospital in Belfast where she subsequently died from Hyponatraemia.

An inquest subsequently found her death was caused by the mismanagement of the drip she had been placed on by consultant paediatrician Jarlath O'Donohoe, and had been his responsibility to manage. In 2009, Evans appeared as a witness to a General Medical Council hearing regarding 'fitness to practice' of O'Donohoe.

Crawford's case became one of five cases at the centre of a public inquiry into hyponatraemia-related deaths in Northern Ireland, to which Evans was called upon to provide expert evidence.

== Politics ==
Evans is a longstanding member of Plaid Cymru, described in Welsh national media as a 'stalwart' supporter.

Evans was one of a number of candidates for national chair of Plaid Cymru in 2019. He also represented the party for Senedd Cymru in Swansea East in 2003, and at the 1991 Neath Parliamentary By-Election.

== Bibliography ==
- Coffey, Jonathan; Moritz, Judith (2024). Unmasking Lucy Letby: The Untold Story of the Killer Nurse. Orion Publishing Group, Limited. ISBN 978-1-3996-2517-3.
