= Abraham Solomonick =

Soviet-born Israeli scientist, philologist, semiotician and philosopher

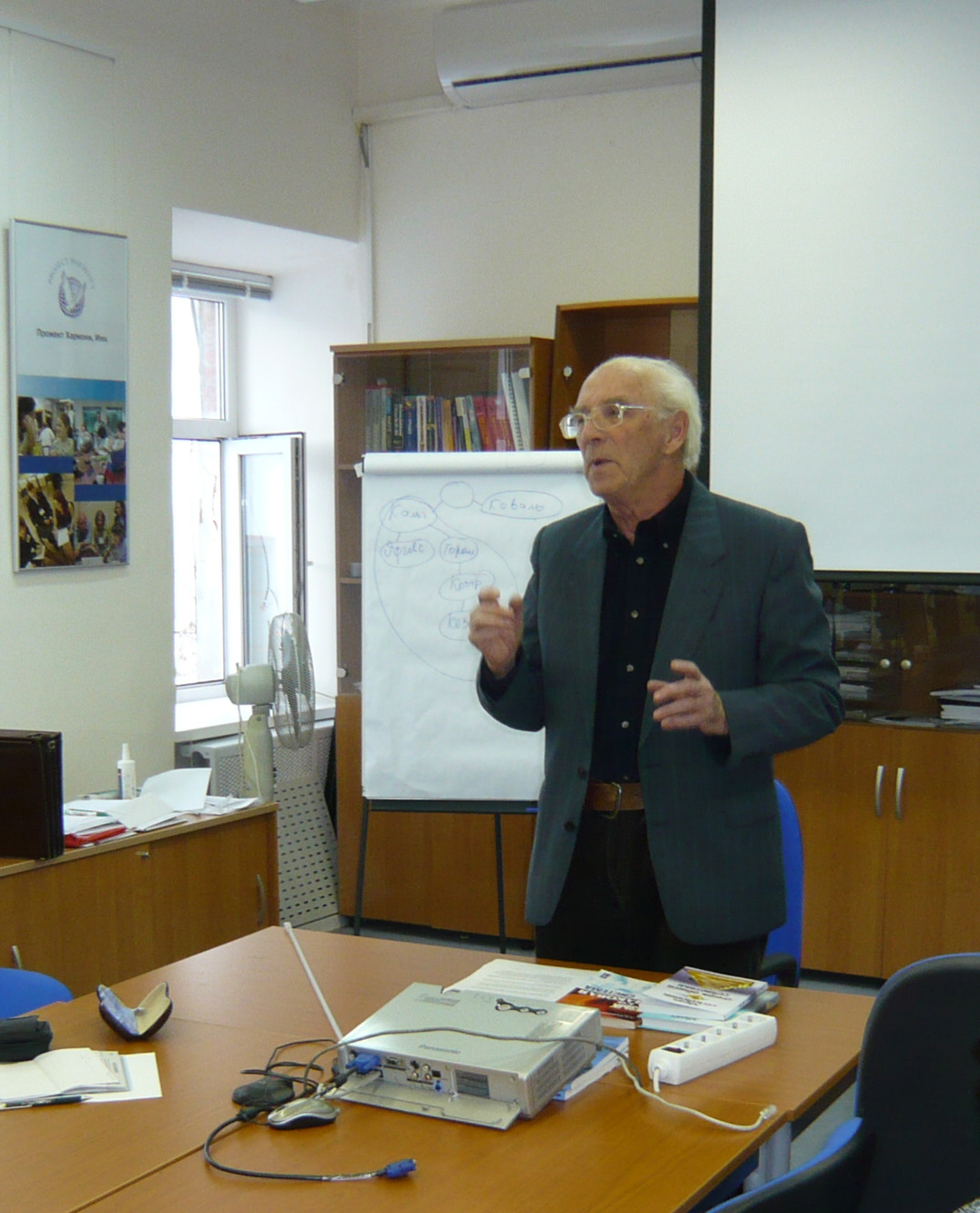
Abraham Solomonick

Abraham Solomonick, also Avraham Solomonick, Abraham Salomonick (Hebrew: אברהם סולומוניק; born December 10, 1927, in Haradok, Byelorussian SSR) is an Israeli scientist, philologist, semiotician, and philosopher, and is the author of several Hebrew-English and English-Hebrew dictionaries.

== Biography ==
Abraham Solomonick was born on December 10, 1927, in Haradok, a Belarusian town near Vitebsk. His father, Ben Zion, was a pharmacist, and his mother, Fruma, was a pediatrician. In 1933, the family moved to Leningrad, where Solomonick graduated from secondary school and, in 1949, from the Law Institute, named after Mikhail Kalinin. He was sent to work as a barrister in the Vologda district, and worked there until 1953. During this time, he also studied the teaching of English at the local Pedagogical Institute, receiving a master's degree in the field at the beginning of 1954.

After completing his master's degree, Solomonick moved back to Leningrad to be with his family. In Leningrad, he taught English at secondary schools and at the university, and also continued his graduate studies. In 1966, he successfully defended his Doctoral thesis and received a Doctoral degree in applied linguistics (the teaching of foreign languages to adults). He then joined the Research Institute of Adult Education, a branch of the Russian Pedagogical Academy of Sciences, where he became a senior research fellow in the field of teaching foreign languages (mainly, English) to adults.

In April 1974, Solomonick immigrated to Israel with his wife and two children, taking up residence in Jerusalem. In November of the same year, he began working at the Israeli Ministry of Education as a supervisor of Ulpans (centers for teaching Hebrew to adults from a wide range of countries). In this capacity, he was responsible for formulating the teaching methods and developing the study materials that were used in the Ulpans. Among his most important accomplishments were the composition of new teaching manuals and the setting up of language laboratories with visual and audio devices to help adults learn Hebrew.

In 1993, Solomonick retired, but he continued writing grammars and dictionaries for various categories of learners (see below). During the 1990s, he developed a fascination for semiotics − the science of signs and sign-systems − and wrote ten monographs on the subject (eight in Russian and two in English). His semiotic studies led him to new philosophical generalizations, and he formulated his own theory of cognition, different from the existing views on this problem.

== Works ==
While working at the Ministry of Education, Solomonick created a broad selection of teaching aids geared to different types of learning communities. Among his works were grammars for Russian and English speakers, phonetic exercises for them and for Ethiopian Jews, and lessons for presentation in radio broadcasts to the former Soviet Union. The pinnacle of his activities during this period was his creation of a manual for Ulpan teachers, "The Principal Concepts in Teaching Additional Languages to Adults", and his compilation of "Comparative Grammars" between Hebrew, on the one hand, and grammatical phenomena in English, French, Spanish, Russian, Georgian, Amharic, and Persian, on the other hand. In his final years at the Ministry of Education, Solomonick began to familiarize the Ulpan teachers with computers, laying the groundwork for the introduction of computer-aided learning as one of the mainstays of the Ulpans' activities.

After his retirement, Solomonick began writing grammars and dictionaries for English and Russian speakers at the Mila Publication Co. Between 1995 and 2003, he wrote, edited, or initiated a score of different dictionaries and grammars. These works were collected into two teaching kits: one for English speakers and the other for Russian speakers.

In addition to his linguistic activities, Solomonick is deeply involved in the field of semiotics. He has written a number of books and articles on the topic and spoken at international conferences. He is currently recognized as an expert in the field. Not only has he developed his own concept of general semiotics, but he has also tried to apply it to various branches of semiotics, including linguistics, pedagogy, advertising, and cartography. Solomonick views general semiotics as the "trunk" of the “tree” of semiotics; every semiotic branch sprouts from this trunk, and all are united by the common laws and principles represented by the trunk.

His fascination with the philosophy of cognition resulted in some books on the topic published in Petersburg (in Russian) and also at Cambridge University (in English). Meanwhile, one of his books – ″Essay on General Semiotics″ – was translated and published in China. Two other books were translated into Welsh and Japanese.

== Semiotic theory ==
Solomonick's theory of general semiotics is founded on the classification of sign-systems by their basic signs (taxons). The theory identifies five types of sign-systems: natural, iconic, linguistic, notational, and mathematical; each type includes systems with the same types of basic signs (see illustration).

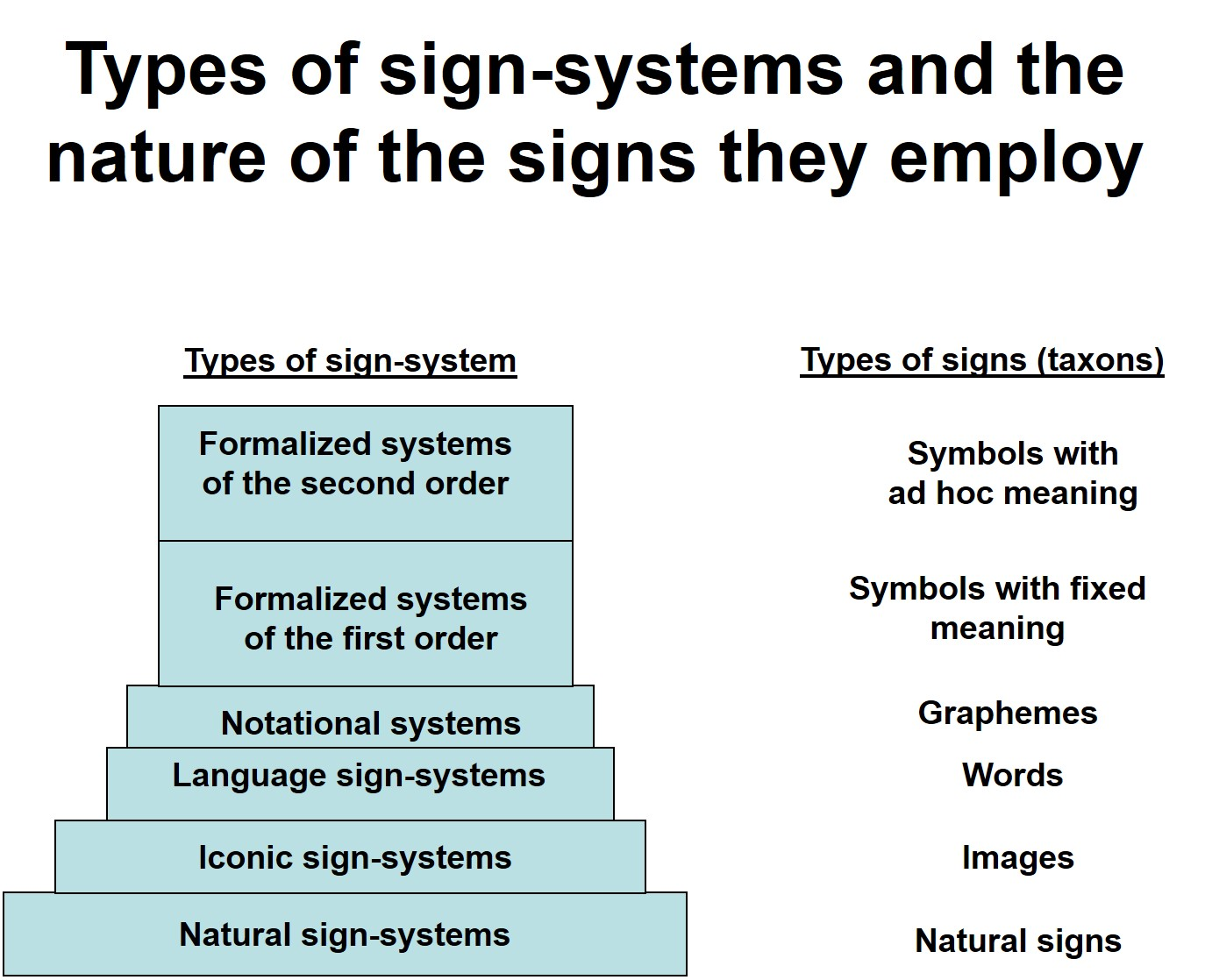
Types of sign-systems

In Solomonick's general theory, the six types of sign-systems are arranged in a way that reflects both the order in which they appeared in human phylogenetic development (the development of the species as a whole, over time) and the order in which they appear ontogenetically in the understanding of each human being as they grow and develop.

At the inception of the human race, the first signs humans encountered and accepted as such were natural signs. Every natural phenomenon served them as a sign; smoke was a sign of burning, darkness was a sign of approaching night, etc.

As people grew accustomed to these kinds of natural signs, they began to invent artificial signs as well. First, they invented signs that resembled the things they denoted – images of their prototypes. Then they started to think up signs that were more and more remote from the things they signified. Thus, sign-systems built upon words appeared, followed later by sign-systems built on graphemes (letters), and, finally, sign-systems whose signs are entirely arbitrary – mathematical signs and other symbols.

The theory of general semiotics arranges the types of sign-systems in a hierarchy that reflects this gradual development. Each higher level in the hierarchy represents basic signs of a more abstract character – more remote from the things they denote – than the basic signs of the level below it. This hierarchy is illustrated in the diagram above.

In the course of human development, each type of sign could only come into existence with the support of its predecessors. Furthermore, once it came into existence, each type of sign affected the further development of all previous types of signs. The various sign-systems that have developed at each stage in human history, and their interdependence, have shaped the science and culture of every generation since the dawn of mankind. The collection of signs and sign-systems that surround us at any given moment constitutes the semiotic reality we use in our everyday life, in our scientific investigations, and in our cultural activities.

In the course of semiotic development, people gradually improved their minds and acquired new qualities. Mastering natural signs helped them to cope with pressing everyday problems. Iconic sign-systems developed the imagination and allowed the arts to be pursued. Languages have provided the ability to logically discuss any problem that arises; notational systems created interpersonal communication and ensured the preservation of the acquired knowledge for posterity; formalized systems formed the basis of scientific developments and progress of sciences and crafts. All this taken together has created a semiotic reality, which, along with the surrounding reality, forms the basis of human existence.

Solomonick holds that his theory of general semiotics is reflected in all spheres of human existence. He has demonstrated manifold practical applications for the theory in his various works and continues to produce new works that further develop this theme. A succinct review of his ideas in English can be found in his paper, which was published in September 2010 in China: (The journal "Chinese Semiotic Studies", School of Foreign Languages and Cultures, Nanjing Normal University) and in his book A Theory of General Semiotics published by Cambridge Scholars Publishing in 2015. Many of his other works are available on the Internet, in English or in Russian.

== The problem of material vs. ideal in cognition ==
In very recent times, A. Solomonick developed yet another model that refines the role of signs within the framework of the “material vs. ideal” dichotomy. This opposition has accompanied philosophers throughout the entire course of human development. Solomonick overlays this dual interaction with a semiotic structure, arguing that only signs can realize the specific content and relationship between the “material” and the “ideal.” He cites cases in which one of these two concepts predominates in the paradigm of human behavior. For example, among botanists or surveyors, the material takes precedence. In contrast, among artists, the ideal dominates, such as in painting or literature. In the scientific paradigm, the two balance each other: Kepler formulated his laws describing the planetary orbits around the sun based both on empirical observations and on his belief that this was the will of the Almighty. Finally, in the unconscious (in dreams or waking fantasies), the ideal operates without regard for material data. In any case, the issue is resolved through signs, which, however, function according to different rules in each of the mentioned contexts. Therefore, each of us must learn and apply the specific behavioral rules dictated by the particular combination of the material and the ideal in a given act of cognition. On this subject, Solomonick has written several articles and the book “Signs between the 'Material Hammer' and the 'Ideal Anvil,'“ which he has published on the website Academia.edu.

== Philosophy of cognition ==
In Solomonick's view, while studying the ontological environment, humans develop a new sphere of reality: the semiotic one, which includes all signs and sign-systems, invented and accepted in different civilizations on Earth. Little by little, this sphere becomes independent, obtains its own laws of development, and equals in importance with the ontology. This makes it the partner of the ontological reality in all ongoing ventures for new scientific and technological feats. Their partnership cooperates with the human wisdom that introduces its share of human cognition. Acting together, these three forces make breakthroughs possible and allow the progress of the human race. There are many implications in such an approach – they contain the context of his latest publications.
