= Dunne v National Maternity Hospital =

Irish supreme court case

- Court: Supreme Court
- Full case name: William Dunne (an infant suing by his mother and next friend Catherine Dunne), Plaintiff, v The National Maternity Hospital and Reginald Jackson, Defendants [1985 No 2015P]
- Citation: [1989] IR 91

Court membership
- Judges sitting: Thomas Findlay, Frank Griffin, Anthony J. Hederman

Keywords
- Medical negligence

Dunne v National Maternity Hospital [1989] IR 91 was a legal case from Ireland, heard in the Supreme Court of Ireland in Dublin. The case had a significant influence on Irish tort law, in that it laid down the six core rules for assessing medical negligence.

== Facts ==
Catherine Dunne presented to the National Maternity Hospital on 20 March 1982; she was pregnant with twins, and had gone into labour two weeks ahead of her estimated date of delivery. It was the routine practice in that hospital at the time to only monitor the heart rate of one of the two twins during labour in a multiple pregnancy, on the assumption that one twin's heart beat was a reliable proxy for the other. The first twin was born naturally six hours after Dunne arrived at the hospital, but shortly afterwards the second twin was born dead with signs of skin maceration. Over subsequent days, it became clear that the first twin had sustained severe brain damage, resulting in an irreversible quadriplegia and mental handicap.

== Judgement ==
The 15-day trial was held in front of a judge and jury in the High Court (the trial took place before juries were abolished for such cases in 1988) with Augustus Cullen Law acting for the plaintiff. The jury found against the hospital and awarded damages to the plaintiff amounting to the remarkable sum of £1,039,334 (including general damages of £467,000 for pain, suffering and loss of amenities). The defendants appealed, disputing the jury's findings of fact, the excessive damages, and asserting that the trial judge had instructed the jury poorly on the central issue of negligence.

In the Supreme Court, Finlay CJ upheld the ruling unanimously with Griffin and Hederman JJ.

== Significance ==
In the judgement for the Dunne case, the court set out a series of prerequisites that have become known as the six "Dunne principles". In essence, these state that a medical practitioner cannot be considered negligent unless they take a course of action that no reasonable practitioner of equal status would have taken in those circumstances. As of 2020, the Supreme Court clarified in its decision on another ruling that the Dunne principles remained the appropriate test for medical negligence in Ireland.

This was the first case in which Dewi Evans provided medico-legal evidence.
