= Chris Rees =

Welsh nationalist politician

Edward Christopher Rees (5 January 1931 – 1 December 2001), known as Chris Rees, was a Welsh nationalist politician.

Rees grew up in Swansea and joined Plaid Cymru at an early age. In 1951, he refused to do National Service, on the grounds that he was Welsh, and was sentenced to a year in prison. While imprisoned again later, he stood for the party in Gower at the 1955 general election, taking just over 10% of the vote. He later stood at the 1963 Swansea East by-election, and again in the seat in 1964 and 1966, then in Merthyr Tydfil in 1970, but was never elected.

In 1964, Rees was elected as Vice President of Plaid, unexpectedly beating Elystan Morgan, who was seen as the more conservative candidate. In 1966, Rees instead became the first Chairman of the party, serving until 1970.

Although Rees grew up in an English-speaking family, he learned Welsh as an adult, and it became his main language. He became a college lecturer, and by 1970 was Director of Policy for Plaid. In this role, he produced a detailed language policy which was adopted by the party.

In 1973, Rees adapted the Ulpan system of language learning for Welsh learners, renaming it Wlpan, and from 1975, he focused on running the Centre for Teaching the Welsh Language to Adults, based at what became Cardiff University. He died in Cardiff in December 2001 at the age of 70.

Party political offices
| Preceded by Wynne Samuel | Vice President of Plaid Cymru; 1964–1966 | Succeeded by Edward Millward |
| Preceded by New position | Chair of Plaid Cymru; 1966–1970 | Succeeded by Phil Williams |
