= Ùlpan =

Scottish Gaelic language learning course

Ùlpan is an immersive course which teaches Scottish Gaelic (Gàidhlig). It was developed from the Welsh language Wlpan courses, which were in turn developed from the techniques of Israel's Ulpans (intensive schools for learning Hebrew). The course aims to increase the number of fluent adult speakers.

The course starts with spoken language only, and reading and writing are only introduced once the students have gained some proficiency in the spoken form. The courses are available in many parts of Scotland.

By 2012, there were more than 150 accredited tutors across Scotland and 2,000 adults had taken up learning Gaelic using this method.

Ùlpan has been criticized for having a low completion rate despite receiving over £250,000 of funding from Bòrd na Gàidhlig in 2012 alone. One student said that the course was "neither structured nor logical."

A final report in 2015 reported that 64.9 percent of Ùlpan students' expectations "had been met or exceeded", and over half (53 percent) of learners believed Ùlpan taught Gaelic either "well" or "very well".
