= Ness Edwards =

Welsh Labour Party politician and trade unionist

Member of Parliament for Caerphilly
- In office 4 July 1939 – 3 May 1968
- Preceded by: Morgan Jones
- Succeeded by: Alfred Evans

Personal details
- Born: 5 April 1897 Abertillery
- Died: 3 May 1968 (aged 71) Caerphilly
- Party: Labour

Ness Edwards (5 April 1897 – 3 May 1968) was a trade unionist and Welsh Labour Party politician: he served as Member of Parliament (MP) for Caerphilly from July 1939 until his death.

He was born in Abertillery, Monmouthshire, Wales, the second of six children of Onesimus Edwards Snr and his wife Ellen.

A coal miner and trade unionist, he started work at the Penybont colliery, Abertillery on 5 April 1910, his 13th birthday. By the age of 17 he was elected chairman of the miners lodge at the Arriel Griffin colliery.

In 1917, at the age of 20, he was imprisoned as a conscientious objector to military service in the First World War. He had joined the Independent Labour Party in 1915, and through the ILP he came into contact with the No Conscription Fellowship. When conscription was introduced in 1916, Ness Edwards' conscientious objections to compulsory service were 'absolutist' and based on his trade union and socialist principles. He was treated harshly - imprisoned with hard labour at Dartmoor and later at Wormwood Scrubs, beaten in Brecon barracks and chased naked by soldiers with fixed bayonets, forced to work in stone quarries in freezing weather.

He was elected to Parliament at the 1939 Caerphilly by-election, following the death of Labour MP and fellow conscientious objector Morgan Jones. Edwards remained as Caerphilly's MP until his death in 1968.

At the beginning of World War II Edwards was instrumental in helping Czech miners escape the Sudetenland.

In April 1945 Edwards was part of a Parliamentary delegation sent to Buchenwald concentration camp to gather evidence of war crimes. Edwards recovered a fragment from a human skin lampshade owned by commandant Karl-Otto Koch, which remained in his house until Edwards's granddaughter handed it over to the Buchenwald Memorial Museum in 2025. According to his daughter, Edwards was traumatised by what he witnessed at Buchenwald and could not sleep for several weeks afterwards.

An associate of Aneurin Bevan and Jim Griffiths, Edwards was Parliamentary Secretary to the Ministry of Labour and National Service from 1945 to 1950 and Postmaster General from 1950 to 1951. In 1948 he became a member of the Privy Council.

In 1925 Ness Edwards married Elina Victoria Williams, one of six children of Richard Williams, a county court bailiff, and his wife Anne Davies, of Bridgend. His daughter Llin Golding, born 'Llinos', was Labour MP for Newcastle-under-Lyme from 1986 to 2001: she was appointed to the House of Lords in 2001 as Baroness Golding

Ness Edwards died at Caerphilly Miners' Hospital on 3 May 1968, aged 71.

== Works ==
- (1920) "Some Thoughts on Tactics" Workers' Dreadnought Vol. VII No. 18 24 July 1920
- (1938) History of the South Wales Miners' Federation; vol. 1. Lawrence & Wishart,
- (1958) "Is this the road?"; Cambrian Press, Hughes (1 Jan. 1956)

Parliament of the United Kingdom
Preceded by Morgan Jones	Member of Parliament for Caerphilly; 1939–1968	Succeeded by Fred Evans
Trade union offices
Preceded by Hubert Jenkins	Agent for the East Glamorgan District of the South Wales Miners' Federation; 1932–1934	Post abolished
Preceded by Bryn Roberts	Agent for the Rhymney Valley District of the South Wales Miners' Federation; 1934–1939; With: Albert Thomas	Succeeded by Will Paynter
