= Alfred Evans (politician) =

British politician (1914–1987)

Member of Parliament for Caerphilly
- In office 18 July 1968 – 3 May 1979
- Preceded by: Ness Edwards
- Succeeded by: Ednyfed Hudson Davies

Personal details
- Born: 24 February 1914
- Died: 13 April 1987 (aged 73)
- Party: Labour

Alfred Thomas "Fred" Evans (24 February 1914 – 13 April 1987) was a British Labour Party politician. Evans was Member of Parliament for Caerphilly from a 1968 by-election until 1979, when he retired.

== Biography ==
Evans was born into a miner's family in 1914. He was educated at both primary and grammar schools at Bargoed and went on to study at the University College of Wales Cardiff. He married Mary Katharine O'Marah in 1939 and they had a son and two daughters.

Evans was head of the English Department at Bargoed Grammar School (1937–1949), headmaster of Bedlinog Secondary School (1949–1966), and headmaster of Lewis Boys Grammar School in Pengam (1966–1968).

Evans was Agent to the Ness Edwards, (then MP for Caerphilly), and a Councillor on Gelligaer Urban District Council 1948–1951. He contested unsuccessfully for the Labour Party the Leominster constituency in Herefordshire in 1955 and the Stroud constituency in Gloucestershire in 1959. He served as Labour MP for Caerphilly from 1968 until 1979 when he retired. He died in 1987 aged 73.

Parliament of the United Kingdom
Preceded by Ness Edwards	Member of Parliament for Caerphilly; 1968–1979	Succeeded by Ednyfed Hudson Davies
