= Elwyn Hughes =

Elwyn Hughes is the Senior Co-ordinator for Welsh Courses for Adults in the Department of Lifelong Learning at the University of Wales, Bangor. His achievements over the past 30 years were recognised at the 2005 National Eisteddfod of Wales when he was awarded the "Tlws Goffa Elvet a Mair Elvet Thomas" Award in recognition of his work.

He also plays a prominent national role in the field of Welsh for Adults.

He is the author of the successful Wlpan course for beginners, but he has also written courses and books for more experienced learners throughout north Wales.

His contribution to Bangor University was recognised in 2000 when he was made a Teaching Fellow.
