= Hubert Jenkins =

British politician

- Born: 26 September 1866
- Died: 28 April 1943 (aged 76)
- Occupations: Trade unionist and politician
- Years active: 1882-1943

Hubert Jenkins (26 September 1866 – 28 April 1943) was a British trade unionist and politician.

== Life ==
Born in Walford, Ross-on-Wye, in Herefordshire, Jenkins was educated at Lea School but left it at the age of twelve. He found work underground at the Wigpool Iron Ore Mines in the Forest of Dean, but these mines closed when he was sixteen, and he moved to work in a coal mine near Cinderford. He joined the Forest of Dean Miners' Association and took part in the Association's 1883 strike, but as the miners received no strike pay, he went to his relatives in the Rhondda to live with them and to support himself.

Jenkins found work at coal mines in the Rhondda and met the trade unionist Lewis John. In 1884, John and Jenkins moved to Bedwas, working at a succession of coal mines, and Jenkins was elected as a delegate to the Caerphilly District of the Miners' National Union. Three years later, Jenkins emigrated to Pennsylvania, working in coal mines there, then in Ohio. He joined the Knights of Labour, and then the United Mine Workers of America, becoming the founding secretary of its lodge at Nicholson's Mine.

In 1890, Jenkins returned to Bedwas, working at coal mines there, then in Ynysybwl. He became secretary of the local miners' lodge, which was part of the Cambrian Miners' Association, but due to his trade unionism, he struggled to find work and moved to Caerphilly. In 1897, he was elected as secretary of the Caerphilly District of Miners. The union took part in the Welsh coal strike of 1898, but Jenkins' own pit was not part of the dispute; he continued working underground, while also organising the local miners.

The strike was unsuccessful, but led to the formation of the South Wales Miners' Federation (SWMF), Jenkins becoming a founder of its East Glamorgan District. As one of the smaller districts of the union, it did not employ a full-time agent, but from 1900 Jenkins became its secretary and part-time agent, supplementing his income from 1902 as checkweighman at Senghenydd Colliery. Under his leadership, the district grew, and from 1905 he became its first full-time agent, winning the post over Henry Richard by just 91 votes. From 1907, he also served on the executive committee of the SWMF, and he was prominent in the enquiry into the Senghenydd colliery disaster of 1913.

Jenkins also became politically active, winning election to Caerphilly Urban District Council in 1906, and to Glamorgan County Council in 1907, serving as a Labour Party member. He supported World War I, serving on the Military Appeal Tribunal, and became a magistrate in 1914. He attempted to become the Labour candidate for Caerphilly at the 1918 UK general election, but lost a ballot to Alfred Onions. In 1930, he was elected as chair of the county council.

In 1932, Jenkins stood down as miners' agent but continued to work part-time for the union, working on compensation claims for fatal accidents. He died in 1943.

Trade union offices
| Preceded by Edmund Morgan | Secretary of the East Glamorgan District of the South Wales Miners' Federation; 1900–1905 | Succeeded by Henry Richard |
| Preceded by Edmund Morgan | Agent for the East Glamorgan District of the South Wales Miners' Federation; 1900–1932 | Succeeded by Ness Edwards |
