= Edward Millward =

Welsh academic and politician (1930–2020)

- Born: 28 June 1930; Cardiff, Wales
- Died: 18 April 2020 (aged 89); Aberystwyth, Ceredigion, Wales
- Other name: Tedi
- Education: University College of South Wales
- Occupations: Academic, Politician
- Political party: Plaid Cymru
- Spouse: Silvia Hart
- Children: 2

Edward Glynne Millward (28 June 1930 – 18 April 2020) was a Welsh scholar and nationalist politician.

== Education and marriage ==
Born in Cardiff, Millward studied at Cathays High School there and then the University College of South Wales, before becoming a lecturer. He married Silvia Hart, with whom he had two children: Llio, an actress and singer, and Andras, an author and martial arts trainer, who died in October 2016.

== Welsh language ==
Millward became active in Plaid Cymru. He jointly founded the Welsh Language Society (Cymdeithas yr Iaith) along with Welsh historian John Davies at a Plaid Cymru summer school in the summer of 1962. Millward stood for the party twice in Cardiganshire at the 1966 general election and Montgomeryshire in 1970, but was not elected. In 1966, he was elected as Vice-President of Plaid. He had just completed a two-year term as Vice-President of Plaid Cymru when he was asked to teach Welsh to Prince Charles ahead of his investiture as Prince of Wales. This took place over nine weeks at the University of Wales, Aberystwyth, prior to the investiture of the Prince of Wales on 1 July 1969.

Millward also served as Plaid's spokesperson on water policy in which role he advocated non-violent direct action against the construction of new reservoirs. In 1976, he was libelled by Willie Hamilton, who claimed that he had been involved in terrorist activities while he tutored Charles; he received £1,000 in a settlement.

Millward subsequently focused on his career as an academic, lecturing in Welsh at Aberystwyth. In the early 1980s, he supported Gwynfor Evans' successful campaign for a Welsh language television station. In 2003, he launched a campaign for a centre to commemorate Dafydd ap Gwilym.

== Death ==
Millward died on 18 April 2020 in Aberystwyth, Wales. Prince Charles paid tribute to Millward after his death:

I have very fond memories of my time in Aberystwyth with Dr Millward over 51 years ago. While I am afraid I might not have been the best student, I learned an immense amount from him about the Welsh language and about the history of Wales. After all these years, I am forever grateful to him for helping foster my deep and abiding love for Wales, her people and her culture.

== In popular culture ==
His autobiography, Taith Rhyw Gymro, was published in 2015.

He was played by Mark Lewis Jones in the Netflix series The Crown where he is shown teaching the Prince of Wales Welsh. The episode entitled "Tywysog Cymru" (Prince of Wales) was praised for using the Welsh language in much of its dialogue, and was described as "incredibly useful" in promoting Welsh around the world.

Party political offices
Preceded by Chris Rees	Vice President of Plaid Cymru; 1966–1968	Succeeded by Phil Williams
