= Wlpan =

Language learning method for adults

Wlpan [ˈʊlpan] is the name of an intensive Welsh course for beginners used by some Welsh for Adults courses in Wales. It began in the mid 1970s. Courses continue to be taught, in person and through the internet. The course teaches basic patterns in as short a time as possible.

The first Wlpan course was run by the Extramural Department of the University of Aberystwyth over 6 weeks in the early summer of 1973, having been organised by Chris Rees.

The Wlpan course emphasises the spoken language, and different versions of the course are used in different parts of Wales in order to reflect regional differences in dialect, etc. Further courses are then available to take the learner to a level of fluency in Welsh.

The word Wlpan is derived from the word Ulpan, a Hebrew word meaning "studio" (אולפן ulpan in Hebrew), and used to describe an intensive way of learning that language.

== See also ==
- Elwyn Hughes
