= 1968 Caerphilly by-election =

UK parliamentary by-election

The 1968 Caerphilly by-election of 15 July 1968 was held after the death of Labour MP Ness Edwards.

The seat was very safe, having been won by Labour at the 1966 United Kingdom general election by over 21,000 votes but Plaid Cymru gave Labour a serious fright in this by-election and came close to winning the seat on a huge swing.

== Candidates ==
- Labour chose Alfred Evans to defend their seat, who was a councillor.
- Nationalist party Plaid Cymru stood Philip Williams, who at the time was teaching at University College, Aberystwyth and was mentored by John DA Howell.
- The Conservatives chose Robert Williams.
- Peter Sadler was the choice of the Liberal Party association.

== Result of the previous general election ==
General election 1966: Caerphilly
Party	Candidate	Votes	%	±%
Labour	Ness Edwards	26,330	74.3	+2.2
Conservative	Ronald J Maddocks	5,182	14.6	−2.3
Plaid Cymru	John D A Howell	3,949	11.1	+0.1
Majority		21,148	59.7	+4.5
Turnout		35,461	76.8	−1.6
Registered electors		46,180		
Labour hold		Swing		

== Result of the by-election ==
1968 Caerphilly by-election
Party	Candidate	Votes	%	±%
Labour	Alfred Evans	16,148	45.7	−28.6
Plaid Cymru	Phil Williams	14,274	40.4	+29.3
Conservative	Robert Williams	3,687	10.4	−4.2
Liberal	Peter Sadler	1,257	3.5	N/A
Majority		1,874	5.3	−54.4
Turnout		35,366	75.9	−0.9
Registered electors		46,578		
Labour hold		Swing		
