= Wynne Samuel =

Welsh politician

Wynne Islwyn Samuel (17 October 1911 or 1912 – 3 June 1989) was a Welsh politician.

== Biography ==
Born in Ystalyfera, Samuel became an orphan at an early age. He studied at Ystalyfera Grammar School and then a deacon and lay preacher in the Baptist Church. Although he was given an opportunity to play with Glamorgan County Cricket Club, he was dissuaded by his aunt, and instead became a clerk for Swansea Town Council. In the Second World War he was a conscientious objector.

Samuel joined Plaid Cymru in the early 1930s, and became active in the party when he lost his job, following its policy of neutrality in World War II. He was the party's South Wales organiser from 1940 until 1950, also editing The Welsh Nation, its English-language magazine, and gaining election to Pontardawe Rural District Council. He established a base in Ystalyfera, recruiting sufficiently that it was home to the party's largest branch in South Wales, and he was the party's first Parliamentary candidate in the south, taking second place in the 1945 Neath by-election.

Samuel stood for the party on several further occasions: Neath at the 1945 general election, Aberdare at a 1946 by-election and the 1950 and general elections, and Pembroke in 1970, but was never elected.

In 1954, Samuel was the Secretary of the National Eisteddfod of Wales in Ystradgynlais, although this was not a success, due to heavy rain. In 1960–61, he was President of the Baptist Union of Wales.

In later life, he studied law with the University of London External System, and then obtained a doctorate from the National University of Ireland, following which he became a barrister and law lecturer at Chester Technical College. He also set up Cymdeithas Bro a Thref Cymru, an organisation bringing together the town and community councils of Wales.

Party political offices
Preceded by R. Tudur Jones	Vice President of Plaid Cymru; 1962–1964	Succeeded by Chris Rees
