= Robyn Léwis =

Welsh politician and archdruid (1929–2019)

- Born: October 1929; Llangollen, Clwyd, Wales
- Died: August 12, 2019 (aged 89)
- Education: University College of Wales, Aberystwyth
- Occupations: Politician, writer, judge, barrister

Robyn Léwis (October 1929 – 12 August 2019) was a Welsh author, politician and former archdruid of the National Eisteddfod of Wales.

== Biography ==
Born Robyn Lewis, he studied at Pwllheli Grammar School and University College of Wales, Aberystwyth before becoming a solicitor and barrister. He became active in the Labour Party and stood, unsuccessfully, in Denbigh at the 1955 general election.

During the 1960s, Léwis left Labour and joined Plaid Cymru. He was elected to Lleyn Rural District Council, and stood for the party in Caernarfon at the 1970 general election, where he came second with more than 33% of the vote. He was subsequently elected as a Vice President of Plaid Cymru.

In 1980, Léwis won the Prose Medal at the National Eisteddfod of Wales, and in 2002 he was the first Prose Medallist to become Archdruid, under the title "Robyn Llŷn". In this role, he inducted future Archbishop of Canterbury Rowan Williams as a Bard of the Gorsedd.

Léwis resigned from Plaid Cymru in 2006, in protest at the acceptance of an OBE by Elinor Bennett, the wife of Dafydd Wigley, a former leader of Plaid Cymru.

Party political offices
Preceded by Phil Williams	Vice President of Plaid Cymru; 1970–1976	Succeeded by Phil Williams
Cultural offices
Preceded by Meirion Evans	Archdruid of the National Eisteddfod of Wales; 2002–2005	Succeeded by Selwyn Griffith
