= R. Tudur Jones =

Welsh nationalist and theologian

Robert Tudur Jones (28 June 1921 – 23 July 1998), better known as R. Tudur Jones, was a Welsh nationalist and one of the country's leading theologians. His nationalistic stance, combined with Calvinist doctrine, created an integrated vision that was significant to the religious life of Christian Wales in the later half of the 20th century.

== Early life ==
Jones was born at Tyddyn Gwyn, Llanystumdwy, north Wales but soon the family moved to Rhyl. Christian faith was the foundation of family life as his parents experienced the spiritual zeal of the 1904–1905 Welsh Revival. The family were members of the local Welsh Congregational Church and while other children recited verses on the Sunday morning, as it is a tradition in nonconformist churches, he would recite a whole chapter. Though being raised as a Christian, it is said that the turning point in his life was when he heard D. Martyn Lloyd-Jones preach at an evangelistic crusade at Rhyl Pavilion where he believed he encountered God.

Jones' interest in ecclesiastical history started when he was a pupil at Rhyl Grammar School. There his history teacher, S. M. Houghton (father of the physicist, Sir John Houghton), taught him about the Puritans and he read New Testament Greek with the headmaster, T. I. Ellis. After Grammar School he won a Scholarship to Jesus College, Oxford. His father, however, insisted that he attend the University of Wales instead. He graduated in 1942 from the University of Wales, Bangor, with a degree in philosophy and afterwards went on to a Bachelor of Divinity degree in theology in Bangor. Then he left Bangor for Mansfield College, Oxford, where he researched for his Doctor of Philosophy degree.

== Career ==
Returning from Oxford in 1948, now married, Jones was ordained as minister of Seion Welsh Congregationalist Chapel, Aberystwyth. After only two years he left Seion to pursue an academic career. In 1950 he was appointed as tutor in Church History at Bala-Bangor Theological Seminary, Bangor, north Wales, and by 1965 he had risen to be the principal of Bala-Bangor, which post he held until the Welsh Congregationalists merged their two colleges, Bala-Bangor and the Memorial College, Aberystwyth in 1988. After his semi-retirement in 1988 he accepted a post as an honorary lecturer in the theology department of the University of Wales Bangor, a post he held until 1997.

== Theology ==
Most of Jones' publications were of a historical nature. Nevertheless, his theology and his opinions on doctrine would surface regularly in his work. He was a firm Calvinist, and although it is tempting to classify him as evangelical (see also his fellow Welsh Christian scholars Bobi Jones and R. Geraint Gruffydd), he distanced himself from the pietistic evangelicalism that rose from the ashes of the 1904–1905 Welsh Revival. He opposed liberal theology and feared humanism's effect on the people of Wales.

== Nationalist ==
Jones not only contributed to Wales at a spiritual level but also got involved in the nationalist struggle through his leadership role in Plaid Cymru and his support of Cymdeithas yr Iaith Gymraeg (the Welsh Language Society). He was vice president of Plaid Cymru for a period and stood elections in the party's name in Anglesey during the 1959 and 1964 elections. His nationalistic arguments are put forward in his book The Desire of Nations where he notes that his nationalism "asks nothing for itself that it does not wish for others."

== Publications ==
Jones is listed to have published over 341 books and articles mainly on ecclesiastical history. Among his main publications on ecclesiastical history are Hanes Annibynwyr Cymru (History of the Welsh Congregationalists) and Ffydd ac Argyfwng Cenedl – Cristnogaeth a Diwylliant yng Nghymru 1890–1914 (Faith and the crisis of the Nation – Christianity and Culture in Wales 1890–1914). He also published some work giving political discussion such as his book on nationalism The Desire of Nations.

== Resources ==
- ap Huw, Alwyn ('Hen Rech Flin') 'Y Gwir am Dr Tudur'
- Davies, Gwyn, Light in the Land: Christianity in Wales 200–2000 (2002)
- Pope, Robert : A Giant of Welsh Protestantism – R. Tudur Jones 1921–1998 (2003)

Party political offices
Preceded by W. R. P. George?	Vice President of Plaid Cymru; 1957–1962	Succeeded by Wynne Samuel
