= Phil Williams (Welsh politician) =

Welsh politician (1939–2003)

Professor Phil Williams
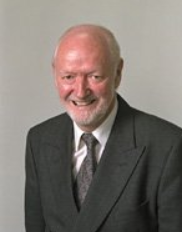

Member of the Welsh Assembly for South Wales East
- In office 6 May 1999 – 1 May 2003
- Preceded by: New Assembly
- Succeeded by: Laura Anne Jones

Personal details
- Born: Philip James Stradling Williams; 11 January 1939 Tredegar
- Died: 10 June 2003 (aged 64) Cardiff
- Party: Plaid Cymru
- Education: Clare College, Cambridge

Philip James Stradling Williams (11 January 1939 – 10 June 2003) was a Welsh politician for Plaid Cymru and scientist.

== Background ==
Williams was born in Tredegar in the industrial valleys of south Wales and grew up in Bargoed, another industrial town. He was educated at Lewis School, Pengam and Clare College, Cambridge, and became a leading space scientist. He was appointed Professor of Solar Terrestrial Physics at the University College of Wales, Aberystwyth, and simultaneously became economic spokesman for Plaid Cymru.

== Political career ==
He contested the 1968 Caerphilly by-election, where he came close to unseating Labour in a safe seat, and became the second Chairman of Plaid Cymru in 1970, a post he held until 1976; when he became vice president of the party. He was responsible for policy and research in the party for many years.

From 1999 to 2003, he was a Member of the National Assembly for Wales for the electoral region of South Wales East. Williams also stood for election in Blaenau Gwent in 1999 and got 21% of the vote.

== Return to science and death ==
He stood down as an Assembly Member in 2003 to work on a research project to study the inner workings of the sun from the observatory near the North Pole. In 2001, he was voted Welsh Politician of the Year, and he was being pressured by former colleagues to become the next president of his party, following the resignation of Ieuan Wyn Jones as president. Shortly after standing down from the Welsh Assembly he suffered a heart attack while visiting a massage parlour in Cardiff and was pronounced dead shortly afterwards.

== Offices held ==
Senedd
Preceded by (new post)	Assembly Member for South Wales East; 1999 – 2003	Succeeded by Laura Anne Jones
Party political offices
Preceded by Chris Rees	Chair of Plaid Cymru; 1970–1976	Succeeded by Eurfyl ap Gwilym
Preceded by Edward Millward	Vice President of Plaid Cymru; 1968–1970	Succeeded by Robyn Lewis
Preceded by Robyn Lewis	Vice President of Plaid Cymru; 1976–1978	Succeeded by Dafydd Ellis Thomas
Preceded by Dafydd Ellis Thomas	Vice President of Plaid Cymru; 1982–1984	Succeeded by Dafydd Iwan
