= John L. Williams (Welsh nationalist) =

Welsh nationalist activist (1924-2004)

John Lasarus Williams (29 October 1924 – 15 June 2004), known as John L, was a Welsh nationalist activist.

Williams was born in Llangoed on Anglesey, but lived most of his life in nearby Llanfairpwllgwyngyll. In his youth, he was a keen footballer, and he also worked as a teacher. His activism started when he campaigned against the refusal of Brewer Spinks, an employer in Blaenau Ffestiniog, to permit his staff to speak Welsh. This inspired him to become a founder of Undeb y Gymraeg Fyw, and through this organisation was the main organiser of Sioe Gymraeg y Borth (the Welsh show for Menai Bridge using the colloquial form of its Welsh name).

Williams also joined Plaid Cymru. He was a long-serving councillor on Gwynedd County Council, and was twice the party's candidate for Anglesey, at the 1970 and 1979 general elections.

Williams later worked at Bangor Normal College, lecturing in Welsh. He wrote a number of books, on history, the Welsh language, and also his autobiography.
