= Cymdeithas y Dysgwyr =

Society for people learning the Welsh language

Cymdeithas y Dysgwyr, better known as CYD, is a movement that offers social opportunity to bring Welsh learners and speakers together so that Welsh learners can improve their oral skills in the language and get a deeper understanding of Welsh culture.This can happen at the local branch level by branches joining to arrange area activities by joining national activities such as the quiz, residential weekends, etc. Professor Bobi Jones, a renowned Welsh scholar, is one of the founders of CYD and currently serves as its honorary president.
