= Diploma of the Royal College of Obstetricians and Gynaecologists =

Postgraduate non-specialist obstetric & gynaecological medical qualification in the UK

The Diploma of the Royal College of Obstetricians and Gynaecologists (DRCOG or DObst RCOG) is a postgraduate medical qualification in the United Kingdom awarded by the Royal College of Obstetricians and Gynaecologists (RCOG) to doctors who are not specialists in obstetrics and gynaecology, but who have demonstrated enhanced knowledge in the field and may be pursuing adjacent roles in women's health, such as becoming a General Practitioner with Special Interest in the field.

== See also ==
- Membership of the Royal College of Obstetricians and Gynaecologists (MRCOG)
