= Ioan Bowen Rees =

Welsh lawyer and author (1929–1999)

Ioan Bowen Rees (13 January 1929 – 4 May 1999) was a Welsh poet, mountaineer and political activist.

Born in Dolgellau, Rees studied at the grammar school, then at Bootham School in York. He won a scholarship to Queen's College, Oxford, before becoming a solicitor working for Denbighshire County Council. He became active in Plaid Cymru, and stood unsuccessfully in Conway at the 1955 and 1959 general elections, then in Merthyr Tydfil in 1964.

Rees worked for local government in Lancashire, Cardiff and Pembrokeshire before returning to Gwynedd, where he was County Secretary from 1974, and then Chief Executive from 1980 until 1991. An advocate of localism and environmentalism, he wrote Government by Community as a critique of the planned changes to local government enacted in the Local Government Act 1972; this won the Royal Institute of Public Administration's Haldane Medal.

Later in life, Rees compiled an anthology, The Mountains of Wales, and he became a druid of the Gorsedd in recognition of his Welsh-language poetry. He was on the advisory council for the creating of the National Assembly for Wales, but died shortly before it opened.

Rees' son, Gruff Rhys, became a well-known musician with the Super Furry Animals.
