= Ulpan =

Institute or school for the intensive study of Hebrew

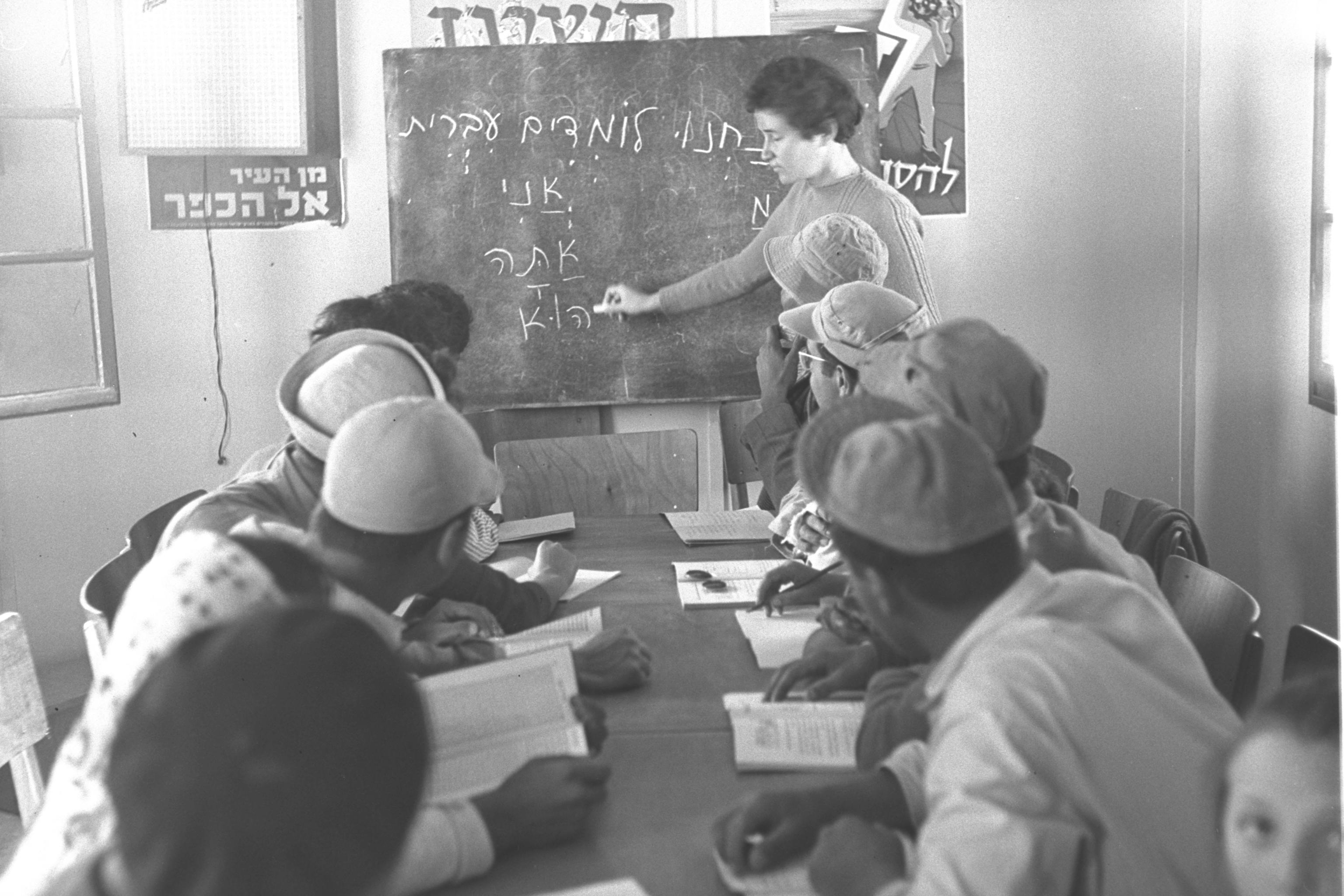
Ulpan in Dimona, 1955

An ulpan (Hebrew: אולפן), plural ulpanim, is an institute or school for the intensive study of Hebrew. Ulpan is a Hebrew word meaning "studio", "teaching", or "instruction".

The ulpan is designed to teach adult immigrants to Israel the basic language skills of conversation, writing, and comprehension. Most ulpanim also provide instruction in the fundamentals of the culture of Israel, history, and geography. The primary purpose of the ulpan is to help new citizens integrate as quickly and easily as possible into the social, cultural, and economic life of their new country.

== History ==
The concept of the ulpan was initiated soon after the creation of Israel in 1948. The new country was faced with a massive influx of new immigrants, refugees from war-torn Europe, oppressed and disadvantaged communities from Africa and the Middle East, and others from all parts of the world. Their language and culture varied widely. The ulpan was created to help them learn the Hebrew language and assimilate into the culture.

Ulpan Etzion in Jerusalem's Baka neighborhood was established in 1949 by Mordechai Kamerat as a model for Hebrew language education used across Israel. It was a residential facility for single olim between the ages 21 and 35 holding a bachelor's degree. Staff and students said that the atmosphere of the campus, its central location, and the high quality of teaching, made it a sought-after destination. One of Ulpan Etzion's notable alumni was Israeli satirist Ephraim Kishon. News anchor Haim Yavin taught there.

The institution of the ulpan continues to serve immigrants today. There are numerous private facilities but the majority are run by the Jewish Agency, municipalities, kibbutzim, and the universities.

While some ulpanim are free, some charge a fee depending on the type and length of the course. Since the establishment of the first ulpan in Jerusalem in 1949, more than 1.3 million new immigrants have graduated from ulpanim.

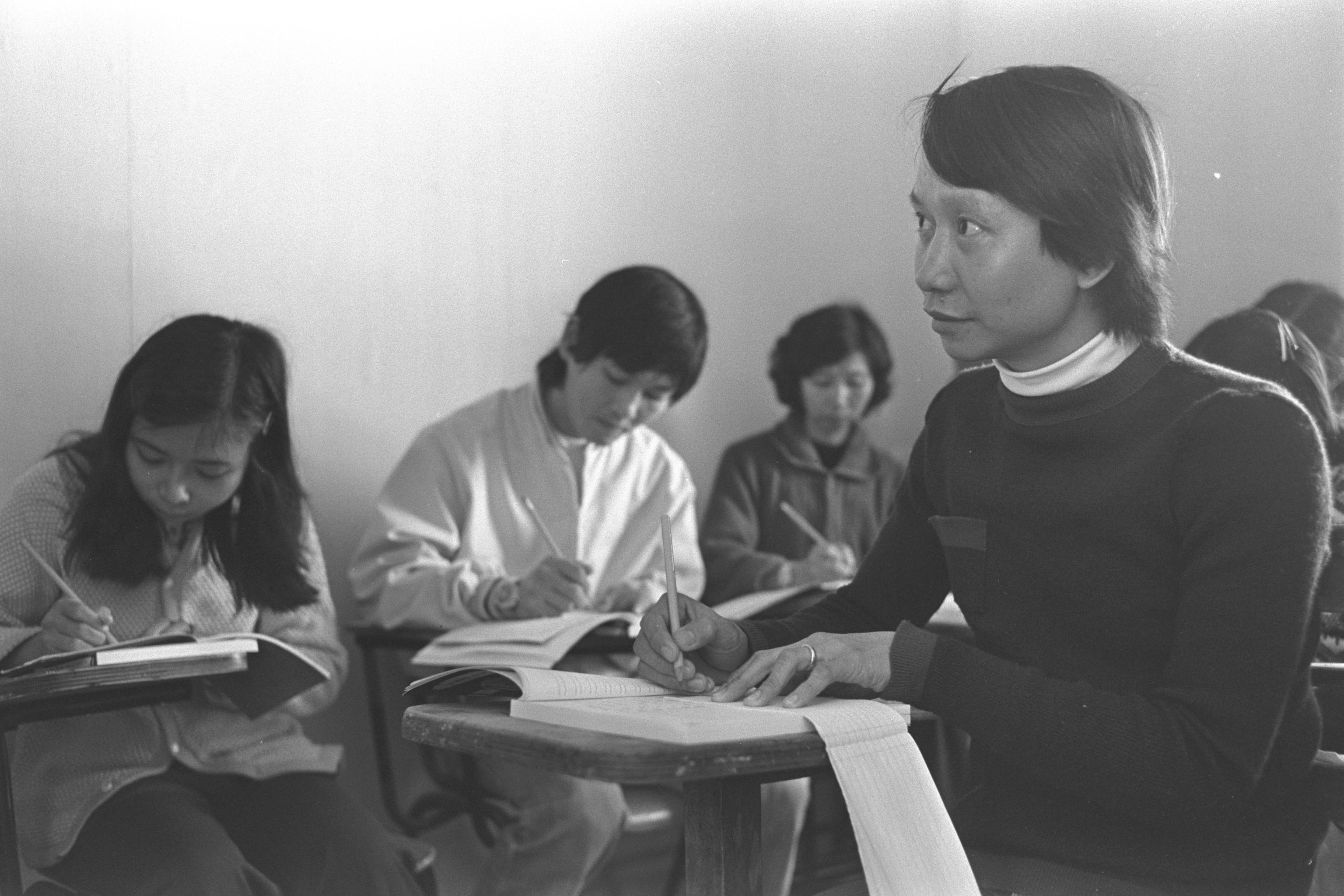
Ulpan for Vietnamese refugees in Afula, 1979

The ulpan framework has been adopted by other nations attempting to revive their own declining or lost languages. Wales, Scotland, and Norway have used the ulpan model for native-language instruction. Certain language courses in Wales and Scotland have even retained the name ulpan (spelled wlpan in Welsh and ùlpan in Scottish Gaelic). The Sámi people of Norway sent a delegation to Israel in 2012 in order to experience Israel's ulpan program and apply its methods toward the preservation of its own threatened linguistic heritage.

== Kibbutz ulpan ==
A number of kibbutzim across Israel also offer ulpan courses. The course typically lasts 5 months and the Ulpanists will usually work part-time on the kibbutz (either 4 hours a day or 8 hours every other day, depending on the kibbutz) in addition to their studies.

Participants have the option of choosing kibbutz ulpan programs either on religious kibbutzim in the Religious Kibbutz Movement (HaKibbutz HaDati) or on secular kibbutzim.

== Criticism ==
A government study in 2007 has shown that even after five months of intensive Hebrew study at ulpan, 60% of new immigrants over the age of 30 cannot read, write or speak Hebrew at a minimum level. The situation amongst the Russian immigrant population is even more dire with 70% of immigrants not being able to understand the Hebrew television news.

As a result of the study, the Knesset has set up an interministerial committee to study the situation and make recommendations to improve and change the ulpan system. Several alternative teaching systems are being considered for use in the ulpan framework.

== See also ==
- Culture of Israel
- Education in Israel
- Jewish Agency for Israel
- Wlpan (intensive Welsh language course, inspired by ulpan)
