= Skin maceration =

Skin damage from prolonged exposure to moisture

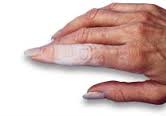
Skin maceration caused by bandage

Maceration is defined as the softening and breaking down of skin resulting from prolonged exposure to moisture. It was first described by Jean-Martin Charcot in 1877. Maceration is caused by excessive amounts of fluid remaining in contact with the skin or the surface of a wound for extended periods.

Maceration often occurs with the application of a bandage to a wound, regardless of its mildness or severity, particularly if the bandage prevents water from evaporating from the surface of the skin. This occurs because the skin under the bandage becomes wet due to perspiration, urine or other bodily fluids, or contact with other liquids. The excess moisture is sometimes called hyperhydration.

One may also notice maceration after wearing non-breathable plastic or latex rubber gloves, which trap moisture against the skin.

Wrinkles are the first sign that the skin is over-hydrated. In addition, macerated skin becomes extremely soft and takes on a whitish appearance. However, this white skin should not be confused with the pale, whitish appearance of the new epithelial tissue in a healing wound.

Although most maceration clears up quickly once the skin is exposed to fresh air and allowed to dry, sometimes skin that experiences long periods of maceration is vulnerable to fungal and bacterial infection. As opportunistic organisms affect the area, it may become itchy or develop a foul odour.
