= Hartley Booth =

British politician

Hartley Booth MP

Member of Parliament for Finchley
- In office 9 April 1992 – 8 April 1997
- Preceded by: Margaret Thatcher
- Succeeded by: Constituency abolished

Personal details
- Born: Vernon Edward Hartley Booth; 17 July 1946 (age 80)
- Party: Conservative
- Education: Downing College, Cambridge

Vernon Edward Hartley Booth (born 17 July 1946) is a former British Conservative Party politician. From 1999 to 2012 he was chairman of the Uzbek British Trade and Industry Council at UK Trade & Investment.

== Early life and career ==
Booth was educated at Queen's College, Taunton, the University of Bristol and Downing College, Cambridge, where he graduated with LLM and PhD degrees. Called to the Bar at the Inner Temple in 1970, he was in legal practice for the next 14 years.

== Political career ==
In 1984 Booth became a special adviser to Prime Minister Margaret Thatcher and a member of the Number 10 Policy Unit. During his time there he and Oliver Letwin, a fellow Policy Unit adviser, co-authored a memo which argued that the government ought not to regenerate certain inner cities, claiming that black youths would use the money for the "discotheque and drug trade", and added: "So long as these bad moral attitudes remain, efforts to improve the inner cities will flounder." However, Booth has (unlike Letwin) "largely escaped notice" with regard to co-authoring the memo.

Having stood unsuccessfully for Hackney North and Stoke Newington in 1983, Booth succeeded Margaret Thatcher as the Conservative Member of Parliament for Finchley from the 1992 general election until the constituency was abolished in the 1997 general election.

Booth resigned in February 1994 as a parliamentary private secretary to Douglas Hogg, then the Foreign Office minister of state, after newspaper reports of a relationship with House of Commons researcher Emily Barr. Despite his resignation, Booth insists that "there was no sexual impropriety" between himself and Barr. This was politically embarrassing to the John Major government of the time, following the backlash of Major's Back to Basics initiative, and in January 2015, the satirical magazine Private Eye criticised Booth for his alleged hypocrisy, saying it went against his recommendations in the newly released 1985 memo that the government should instill values of "personal responsibility, basic honesty, [and respect for] the law and the police" from an early age. Barr went on to be a successful journalist and novelist.

Booth lost a bruising nomination battle with the Hendon South MP John Marshall for the new Finchley and Golders Green constituency, and was unsuccessful in finding another seat before the election. Marshall lost the 1997 general election to Labour's Rudi Vis.

== Personal life ==
A Methodist lay preacher with a wife and three children, Booth is related to the founders of The Salvation Army.

== Publication ==
Booth, with Mark Mallon who had been his constituency election campaign manager, co-wrote and self-published a book on the subject of long-term unemployment and homelessness, titled Return ticket : one hundred and one stories of long-term unemployed people who successfully made the journey back to work.

Parliament of the United Kingdom
Preceded by Margaret Thatcher	Member of Parliament for Finchley; 1992–1997	Constituency abolished
