= Hendon South =

Parliamentary constituency in the United Kingdom, 1945–1997

Coordinates: 51.56°N 0.19°W

- Former borough constituency for the House of Commons
- Local government in Greater London: London Borough of Barnet
- Electorate: 48,401 (1992)

1945–1997
- Created from: Hendon
- Replaced by: Finchley and Golders Green (Majority); Hendon (Minority)

Hendon South was a constituency in the former Municipal Borough of Hendon (in 1965 subsumed into the London Borough of Barnet) which returned one Member of Parliament (MP) to the House of Commons of the Parliament of the United Kingdom. It was created for the 1945 general election, when the Hendon seat was split into two, and abolished for the 1997 general election, with Childs Hill, Garden Suburb, and Golders Green wards going to Finchley and Golders Green, along with wards from Finchley. Hendon and West Hendon wards were transferred to a new constituency: Hendon.

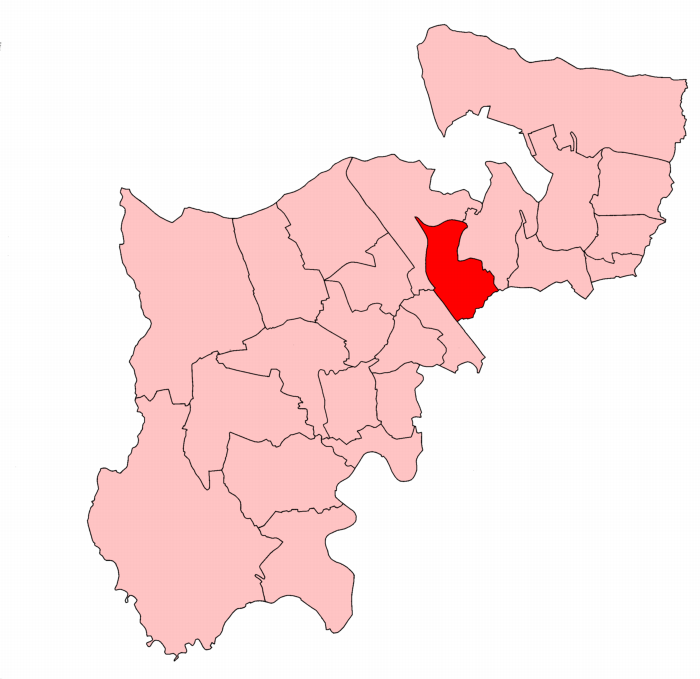
Hendon South in the parliamentary county of Middlesex, showing boundaries used from 1945 to 1974

Map that gives each named seat and any constant electoral success for national (Westminster) elections for Middlesex, 1955 to 1974.

== Boundaries ==
1945–1974: The Municipal Borough of Hendon wards of Central Hendon, Childs Hill, Garden Suburb, Golders Green, and Park.

1974–1997: The London Borough of Barnet wards of Childs Hill, Garden Suburb, Golders Green, Hendon, and West Hendon.

== Members of Parliament ==
Election	Member	Party	Notes
1945	Hugh Lucas-Tooth	Conservative	Member for Isle of Ely (1924–1929); Under-Secretary of State for the Home Department (1952–1955)
1970	Peter Thomas	Conservative	Member for Conwy (1951–1966); Chair of the Conservative Party (1970–1972); Secretary of State for Wales (1970–1974)
1987	John Marshall	Conservative	Member of the European Parliament for London North; Contested Finchley and Golders Green following redistribution
1997	constituency abolished: see Finchley and Golders Green and Hendon		

== Elections ==
=== Elections in the 1940s ===
General election 1945: South Hendon
Party	Candidate	Votes	%
Conservative	Sir Hugh Lucas-Tooth	16,974	43.39
Labour	Elaine Burton	14,917	38.13
Liberal	Alastair Forbes	7,232	18.49
Majority		2,057	5.26
Turnout		39,123	75.35
Conservative win (new seat)			

=== Elections in the 1950s ===
General election 1950: South Hendon
Party	Candidate	Votes	%	±%
Conservative	Sir Hugh Lucas-Tooth	24,917	52.2	+8.8
Labour	Thomas Sargant	15,389	32.2	−5.9
Liberal	Cyril Tolley	7,436	15.6	−2.9
Majority		9,528	20.0	+14.7
Turnout		47,742	83.6	+8.3
Conservative hold		Swing		

General election 1951: South Hendon
Party	Candidate	Votes	%	±%
Conservative	Sir Hugh Lucas-Tooth	26,180	55.40	
Labour	Bernard Homa	16,124	34.12	
Liberal	Leon MacLaren	4,952	10.48	
Majority		10,056	21.28	
Turnout		47,256	81.85	
Conservative hold		Swing		

General election 1955: South Hendon
Party	Candidate	Votes	%	±%
Conservative	Sir Hugh Lucas-Tooth	25,354	62.96	
Labour	Bernard Homa	14,918	37.04	
Majority		10,436	25.92	
Turnout		40,272	73.24	
Conservative hold		Swing		

General election 1959: South Hendon
Party	Candidate	Votes	%	±%
Conservative	Sir Hugh Lucas-Tooth	22,971	55.86	
Labour	Peter Archer	11,016	26.79	
Liberal	Peter Billenness	7,134	17.35	New
Majority		11,955	29.07	
Turnout		41,121	76.80	
Conservative hold		Swing		

=== Elections in the 1960s ===
General election 1964: Hendon South
Party	Candidate	Votes	%	±%
Conservative	Sir Hugh Lucas-Tooth	18,452	48.1	−7.8
Labour	Alec Grant	11,441	29.9	+3.1
Liberal	Peter Billenness	8,430	22.0	+4.7
Majority		7,011	18.2	−10.9
Turnout		38,323	73.7	−3.1
Conservative hold		Swing		

General election 1966: Hendon South
Party	Candidate	Votes	%	±%
Conservative	Sir Hugh Lucas-Tooth	17,176	45.28	
Labour	Geoffrey Samuel	13,120	34.59	
Liberal	Lawrence Young	7,633	20.12	
Majority		4,056	10.69	
Turnout		37,929	72.78	
Conservative hold		Swing		

=== Elections in the 1970s ===
General election 1970: South Hendon
Party	Candidate	Votes	%	±%
Conservative	Peter Thomas	18,901	51.65	
Labour	Gladys Dimson	12,712	34.74	
Liberal	Lawrence Young	4,981	13.61	
Majority		6,189	16.91	
Turnout		36,594	65.86	
Conservative hold		Swing		

General election February 1974: South Hendon
Party	Candidate	Votes	%	±%
Conservative	Peter Thomas	17,795	44.40	
Liberal	Michael Colne	11,198	27.94	
Labour	RM Hadley	11,088	27.66	
Majority		6,597	16.46	
Turnout		40,079	77.89	
Conservative hold		Swing		

General election October 1974: South Hendon
Party	Candidate	Votes	%	±%
Conservative	Peter Thomas	16,866	46.63	
Labour	RM Hadley	11,903	32.91	
Liberal	Michael Colne	7,404	20.47	
Majority		4,963	13.72	
Turnout		36,171	69.71	
Conservative hold		Swing		

General election 1979: South Hendon
Party	Candidate	Votes	%	±%
Conservative	Peter Thomas	19,981	52.77	
Labour	Wendy Mantle	11,231	26.99	
Liberal	Monroe Palmer	5,799	15.32	
Ecology	Geoffrey Syer	563	1.49	New
National Front	Albert Elder	290	0.77	New
Majority		8,750	25.78	
Turnout		37,864	70.18	
Registered electors		53,954		
Conservative hold		Swing		

1979 notional result
Party	Vote	%
Conservative	20,224	52.3
Labour	11,540	29.9
Liberal	6,023	15.6
Others	861	2.2
Turnout	38,648	
Electorate		

=== Elections in the 1980s ===
General election 1983: South Hendon
Party	Candidate	Votes	%	±%
Conservative	Peter Thomas	17,115	48.6	–3.7
Liberal	Monroe Palmer	10,682	30.3	+14.8
Labour	Doreen Neall	7,415	21.1	–8.8
Majority		6,433	18.3	–4.2
Turnout		35,210	65.3	
Registered electors		53,929		
Conservative hold		Swing	–9.2	

General election 1987: South Hendon
Party	Candidate	Votes	%	±%
Conservative	John Marshall	19,341	55.5	+6.9
Liberal	Monroe Palmer	8,217	23.6	–6.7
Labour	Louise Christian	7,261	20.9	–0.2
Majority		11,124	32.0	+13.7
Turnout		34,820	63.8	–1.5
Registered electors		54,560		
Conservative hold		Swing	+6.8	

=== Elections in the 1990s ===
General election 1992: South Hendon
Party	Candidate	Votes	%	±%
Conservative	John Marshall	20,593	58.8	+3.2
Labour	L Lloyd	8,546	24.4	+0.8
Liberal Democrats	J Cohen	5,609	16.0	–4.8
Natural Law	J Leslie	289	0.8	New
Majority		12,047	34.4	+2.4
Turnout		35,037	72.4	+8.6
Registered electors		48,401		
Conservative hold		Swing	+1.2	
