= London North =

London North may refer to:

- London North (provincial electoral district)
- London North (European Parliament constituency)
- North London
