= Wyn Roberts, Baron Roberts of Conwy =

Welsh politician

The Right Honourable The Lord Roberts of Conwy PC
- Official portrait, circa 2005

Minister of State for Wales
- In office 15 June 1987 – 28 November 1994
- Prime Minister: Margaret Thatcher; John Major
- Preceded by: John Stradling Thomas
- Succeeded by: Post reorganised

Parliamentary Under-Secretary of State for Wales
- In office 7 May 1979 – 13 June 1987 Serving with Michael Roberts, John Stradling Thomas & Mark Robinson
- Prime Minister: Margaret Thatcher
- Preceded by: Alec Jones & Edward Rowlands
- Succeeded by: Ian Grist

Member of the House of Lords
- Lord Temporal
- Life peerage 1 October 1997 – 14 December 2013

Member of Parliament for Conwy
- In office 18 June 1970 – 8 April 1997
- Preceded by: Ednyfed Hudson Davies
- Succeeded by: Betty Williams

Personal details
- Born: 10 July 1930 Llansadwrn, Anglesey, Wales
- Died: 13 December 2013 (aged 83) Rowen, Conwy, Wales
- Party: Conservative

Coat of arms of Wyn Roberts, Baron Roberts of Conwy

Crest
A demi-lion with dragon’s wings Gules armed Argent and grasping with both paws a trumpet the bell downwards Or.
Escutcheon
Paly of six Argent and vert a cross patonce Gules on a chief engrailed of three arches also Gules three ancient lamps Argent.
Supporters
On either side a dragon Gules armed Argent dimidating a lion Gules armed Argent each supporting with the exterior core foot a plain carnyx Argent garnished and the bell downwards Or.
Motto
Pleidiol I M Gwald

Ieuan Wyn Pritchard Roberts, Baron Roberts of Conwy, PC (10 July 1930 – 13 December 2013) was a Welsh Conservative politician.

His father was a Minister in a chapel in Llansadwrn, Anglesey, and they lived in the schoolhouse.

He was Member of Parliament (MP) for the constituency of Conwy (formerly Conway) from 1970 until his retirement in 1997. Although he never had a high majority, he maintained his seat for 27 years. Wyn Roberts served as Parliamentary Private Secretary to the Secretary of State for Wales Peter Thomas from 1970 to 1974, and was Opposition spokesman on Wales between 1974 and 1979. On the 1979 Conservative election victory, he was appointed Parliamentary Under-Secretary of State at the Welsh Office. Following the 1987 election, he was promoted to Minister of State at the Welsh Office, a post he held until 1994. He was knighted for political service in 1990.

Following his retirement from the House of Commons, he was elevated as a life peer on 1 October 1997 with the title of Baron Roberts of Conwy, of Talyfan in the County of Gwynedd. He served as an opposition spokesman on Wales in the House of Lords until 2007. He died on 13 December 2013, at his home in Rowen, Conwy, Wales.

Parliament of the United Kingdom
Preceded by Ednyfed Hudson Davies	Member of Parliament for Conwy (Constituency known as Conway, 1970–1983); 1970–1997	Succeeded by Betty Williams
