= John Marshall (Conservative politician) =

British politician (1940–2025)

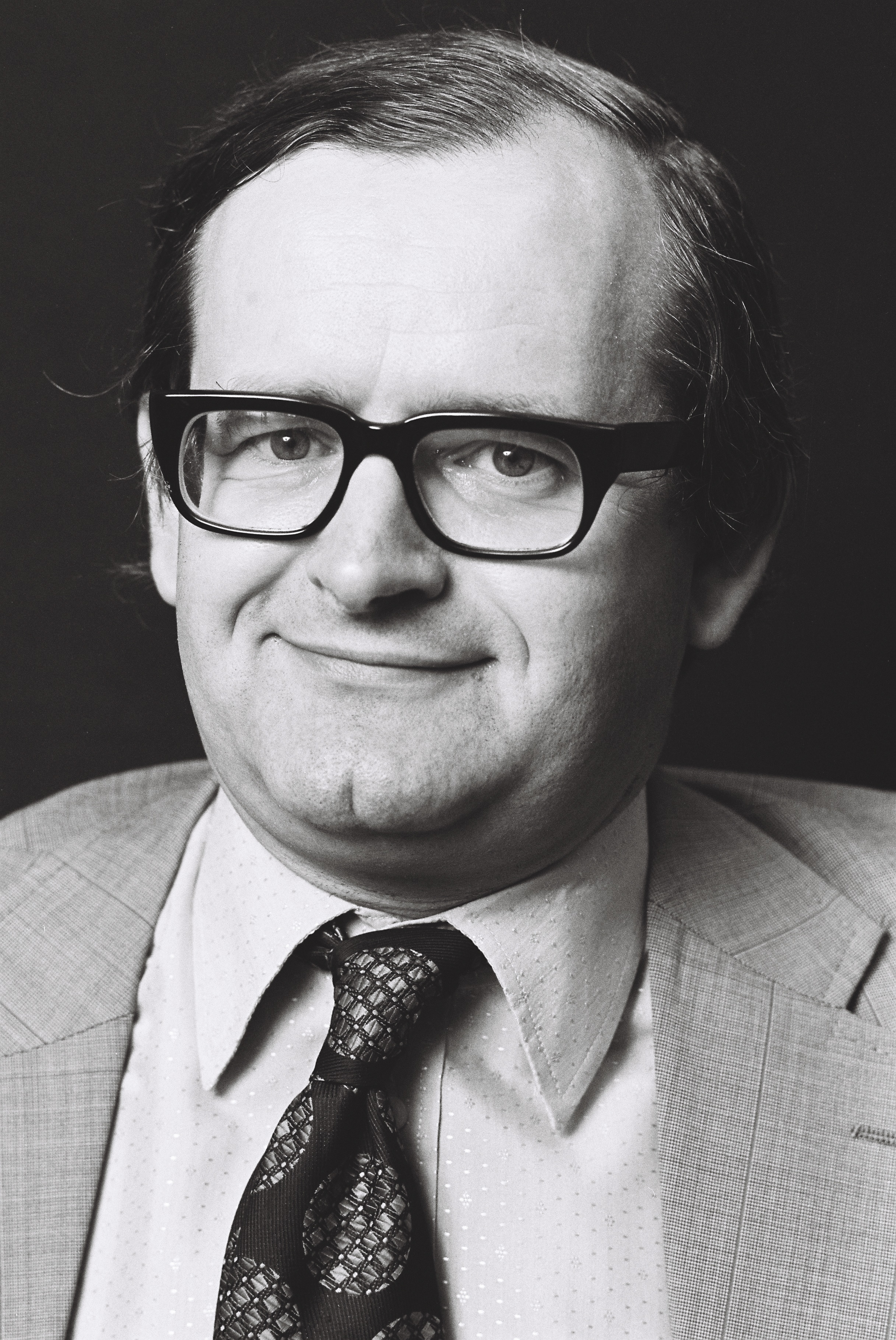
- Official portrait, 1979

Member of Parliament for Hendon South
- In office 11 June 1987 – 8 April 1997
- Preceded by: Hugh Lucas-Tooth
- Succeeded by: constituency abolished

Member of the European Parliament for London North
- In office 1979–1989
- Preceded by: constituency established
- Succeeded by: Pauline Green

Personal details
- Born: 19 August 1940
- Died: 3 November 2025 (aged 85)
- Party: Conservative
- Other political affiliations: National Liberal

John Leslie Marshall (19 August 1940 – 3 November 2025) was a British Conservative politician.

== Early career ==
Marshall was educated at Harris Academy in Dundee, the Glasgow Academy and the University of St Andrews. He then became a university lecturer. He attempted to enter Parliament a number of times before he was successful. In 1964 and 1966, he contested Dundee East but was beaten by the Labour incumbent George Thomson, the first time as a National Liberal and the second time in Conservative colours. He fought Lewisham East in the February 1974 general election, coming second to Labour's Roland Moyle.

He served as a councillor in Aberdeen from 1968 until 1970 and then in Ealing from 1971 until 1986.

Marshall was an MEP for London North from 1979 to 1989.

== Parliamentary career ==
Marshall lost to Michael Portillo in the selection for the 1984 Enfield Southgate by-election but was later selected for Hendon South in the London Borough of Barnet, and was elected as the Member of Parliament for that seat at the 1987 general election. Marshall served as PPS to Tony Newton, when Newton was Leader of the House of Commons.

After the 1992 general election, the Boundary Commission recommended that the four Barnet seats be reduced to three. Sir Sydney Chapman was retained as the candidate for the Chipping Barnet seat, the only one not being abolished, and John Gorst, the sitting MP for Hendon North, was selected to contest the new Hendon constituency. Marshall was therefore pitched together with Hartley Booth, the MP for Finchley, in trying to win the nomination for the new seat of Finchley and Golders Green. Both MPs put a great deal of effort into the fight, hiring minibuses to ensure all their supporters got to the selection meeting; the contest became bitter when Booth accused Marshall of "signing up the dead and the dying" as Conservative members in order to boost his chances of victory.

The new Finchley seat, with similar boundaries to the old Finchley seat, was projected to be held for the Conservatives, albeit by a small majority; when Margaret Thatcher held the seat she normally had majorities of nearly 10,000. Despite most of the new constituency coming from Booth's old seat, Marshall won the selection contest on 1 November 1995 but went on to lose the contest for the seat to the Labour Party candidate Rudi Vis at the 1997 general election, in which the Conservatives experienced their worst electoral defeat in 91 years.

Notable losses included Portillo, who Marshall had lost to in the Conservative selection for the Enfield Southgate by-election thirteen years earlier, along with several cabinet ministers.

== After Parliament ==
In May 1998, Marshall was elected to Barnet London Borough Council for Garden Suburb ward (based on Hampstead Garden Suburb) in his old constituency. He unsuccessfully sought to regain his Finchley and Golders Green seat at the 2001 general election, but Labour's Rudi Vis beat him by 3,716 votes. This was despite Baroness Thatcher herself coming to campaign for him in Golders Green.

Following the Conservative victory in local elections in 2002, he served in the Cabinet. Among other roles, Marshall served as Cabinet Member for Investment in Learning, responsible for implementing the Primary Schools rebuilding programme (known as PSCIP), and the Libraries Strategy, which modernised library provision across the Borough. He was an unsuccessful candidate for the leadership of the Conservative group in 2005.

Marshall was mayor of the London Borough of Barnet in the municipal year 2008–2009. He did not restand at the 2022 elections.

Marshall died on 3 November 2025, at the age of 85.

== Sources ==
- Times Guide to the House of Commons 1997, ed. by Tim Austin

Parliament of the United Kingdom
Preceded by Peter Thomas	Member of Parliament for Hendon South; 1987–1997	Constituency abolished
