= Rudi Vis =

Dutch-British politician (1941–2010)

Member of Parliament for Finchley and Golders Green
- In office 1 May 1997 – 12 April 2010
- Preceded by: Constituency established
- Succeeded by: Mike Freer

Personal details
- Born: Rudolf Jan Vis; 4 April 1941 Alkmaar, Netherlands
- Died: 30 May 2010 (aged 69) London, England
- Citizenship: Netherlands; United Kingdom
- Party: Labour
- Spouses: Joan Hanin (m. 1968; div. 1984); Jacqueline Suffling (m. 2001)
- Children: 3
- Education: Brunel University London; London School of Economics; University of Maryland

Rudolf Jan Vis (4 April 1941 – 30 May 2010) was a Dutch-born British Labour politician who served as Member of Parliament (MP) for Finchley and Golders Green from 1997 to 2010.

== Early life ==
Vis was born in 1941 in the town of Alkmaar, in the Netherlands, where he attended high school. He gained a BSc in economics from the University of Maryland, College Park, in 1970 and was a graduate of the London School of Economics, gaining an MSc in economics in 1972.

He gained a PhD in economics from Brunel University in 1976. From 1971 to 1996, he was a lecturer at the North East London Polytechnic, which became the University of East London.

== Parliamentary career ==
Vis was elected as MP for the newly drawn constituency of Finchley and Golders Green in the 1997 general election, defeating the Conservative MP John Marshall with a majority of 3,189 votes. This was one of Labour's more unexpected victories – part of the constituency formed the Finchley constituency once held by Prime Minister Margaret Thatcher – and Vis had not even taken leave of his post as an economics lecturer prior to the victory.

He was re-elected at 2001 with a slightly increased majority of 3,716, again defeating Conservative Party candidate John Marshall, but in 2005 his majority was greatly reduced to 741 votes, following an increase in support for the Liberal Democrats in the constituency. His constituency was one of the top Conservative targets at the 2010 general election, needing only a swing of 0.2% to the Tories. Knowing he was suffering from cancer, Vis stood down at the 2010 general election.

Vis sat on the Council of Europe. His views were generally, though not dogmatically, to the left wing of the party. He abstained in the mayoral candidate selection of 2000. He opposed the use of PPP for the London Underground, the war on Iraq, top-up fees and foundation hospitals. However, he voted in favour of the government's controversial counter-terrorism legislation.

== Expenses scandal ==
On 5 April 2009 The Times reported that he had used his parliamentary expenses to help buy a £520,000 home for his retirement near the Suffolk coast having taken out a mortgage on his London home to pay for the country property. By informing the parliamentary authorities that his main home had moved to Suffolk, he was able to claim the interest payments on the loan secured on his London home. Over the previous two years, he had claimed more than £40,000. "The rules are questionable," Vis said, "but this is well within the rules and I would have been advised if it wasn't."

He was also discovered to have claimed £5,292 for 15,168 miles of travel between Parliament and his home nine miles away.

== Death ==
Rudi Vis died in his sleep on 30 May 2010 from cancer diagnosed five months earlier.

Parliament of the United Kingdom
New constituency	Member of Parliament for Finchley and Golders Green; 1997–2010	Succeeded by Mike Freer
