= Richard May (judge) =

British judge (1938-2004)

Sir Richard George May (12 November 1938 – 1 July 2004) was a British judge.

May was born in London and educated at Haileybury. Following national service with the Durham Light Infantry, he studied law at Selwyn College, Cambridge. He was called to the bar in 1965, and practised on the Midland and Oxford Circuit, principally in criminal prosecution work, initially from chambers at 10 King's Bench Walk and latterly from Devereux Chambers. He was a Recorder of the Crown Court until he was appointed as a Circuit Judge in 1987.

He was also an active member of the Labour Party in Westminster from the mid-1960s, fighting unsuccessfully for a seat on Westminster City Council in 1968. He was a Parliamentary candidate in South Dorset in the 1970 general election.

In 1971, May was elected to Westminster City Council, where he led the Labour Group from 1974 to 1977. He stood down from the council in 1978 to concentrate on his legal career but was still able to stand in the 1979 contest in Margaret Thatcher's Finchley constituency, when she first came to power as Prime Minister.

He came into the international limelight with his 1997 appointment to the UN's International Criminal Tribunal for the Former Yugoslavia. Most notably, he served as the presiding judge in the trial of former Serbian and Yugoslav president Slobodan Milošević on war crimes charges.

In February 2004, May stepped down from that position, on grounds of poor health. He was knighted in June 2004, and died at his home in Oxfordshire a few weeks later of a brain tumor.
