= T. Atholl Robertson =

Scottish fine arts printer, publisher and Liberal politician

Robertson in 1923

Thomas Atholl Robertson (27 October 1874 – 14 December 1955) was a Scottish fine arts printer and publisher and Liberal politician.

== Family and education ==
Thomas Atholl Robertson was the eldest son of John Robertson of Snaigow, Dunkeld in rural Perthshire. He was educated locally, at Clunie School, Blairgowrie. He married twice; first in 1906 to Flora Campbell, eldest daughter of James Cummings, a dental surgeon. There were two sons and four daughters from the marriage. Flora Robertson died in 1943 and five years later Robertson married Agnes Christie, the daughter of James Paterson of Redgorton in Perthshire. In religion Robertson was a staunch Presbyterian and was an office bearer of the Presbyterian Church in Palmers Green near his London home. One of his relatives, Dr James Robertson of Whittinghame, East Lothian was Moderator of the Church of Scotland in 1909. Although he lived in London for much of his life, Robertson also had a home in Scotland, Dunvorlich, Ewanfield, Crieff in Perthshire.

== Career ==
Robertson was a member of a firm of fine art publishers in Glasgow. He began his career in the city and then undertook formal training in this field in Germany, extending his knowledge of the trade by travelling throughout Europe, Canada, the United States and the Near East. Robertson also served for ten years in the Territorial Army in the Highland Light Infantry, City of Glasgow Regiment.

== Politics ==
Robertson was always a committed Liberal even as a young man. He held a number of positions in the party over the years including being Chairman of the Political Committee of the National Liberal Club and Vice-Chairman of the London Liberal Federation. He took a particular interest in a number of traditional Liberal issues, including land reform and was in 1923 the President of the English League for Taxation of Land Values.

=== Hammersmith ===
Robertson first stood for Parliament at South Hammersmith at the 1918 general election as an Asquithian Liberal. However the sitting Unionist MP Sir William Bull had the benefit of the Coalition coupon and Robertson came second in a three-cornered contest with Labour in third.

=== Finchley ===
He then switched his attention to the Finchley Division of Middlesex for the 1922 general election. In a straight fight with the sitting Conservative MP John Newman he trailed by 1,443 votes. However at the 1923 general election Robertson defeated Newman, winning by a majority of 2,276 votes in another straight fight. Robertson faced a new Conservative opponent in 1924 and was unable to hold his seat, losing to the Hon. Edward Cadogan by 4,335 votes. He tried to regain the seat at the 1929 general election but the Labour Party now also stood a candidate and although he again came second to Cadogan, Robertson was still 4,855 votes in arrears, with Labour in third place. After a period of reflection, Robertson decided to resign as prospective Parliamentary candidate for Finchley and was replaced by Lady Crosfield who had fought Islington North in 1929 and was the wife of Sir Arthur Crosfield the former Liberal MP for Warrington.

=== Kinross and West Perthshire ===
For the 1931 general election Robertson was asked to fight the Scottish seat of Kinross and West Perthshire. The seat was held by the Unionist Duchess of Atholl, the first woman ever to serve in a Conservative government. In a straight fight Robertson was defeated by a majority of 5,695 votes.

=== Return to Finchley ===
Robertson returned to his adopted home of London for the 1935 general election again contesting Finchley, after Lady Crosfield resigned. He again obtained second place, with Labour in third, but the new Conservative candidate succeeding Cadogan, John Crowder, held the seat easily with a majority of 18,040 votes. Crowder continued to represent Finchley until 1959 when he was replaced as Conservative candidate by Margaret Thatcher.

=== Aylesbury ===
Robertson's last attempt to get back in the House of Commons came in 1938. The Conservative MP for the Aylesbury Division of Buckinghamshire, Michael Beaumont, resigned and Robertson was selected as Liberal candidate in the resulting by-election which took place on 19 May 1938. In a three-cornered contest the seat was comfortably retained for the Conservatives by Sir Stanley Reed with a majority of 10,944 votes over Robertson with Labour's Reginald Groves, a journalist, in third place.

== London Scot ==
Robertson was proud of his Scottish heritage and held a number of posts which allowed him to keep in touch with his home country and its culture while living in England. He was sometime Chief of the Scottish Clans Association of London. He served as a Governor of the Royal Caledonian School, at Bushey, in Hertfordshire and he was sometime President of the London Perthshire Association. He was also a Fellow of the Society of Antiquaries of Scotland the senior antiquarian body in Scotland and wrote articles on Scottish and Highland Customs, Folklore and Legends of Perthshire. He was for a while the editor of The Scots Year Book. He was also a Fellow of the Royal Geographical Society.

== Death ==
Robertson died at his home in Palmers Green on 14 December 1955 aged 81 years.

Parliament of the United Kingdom
Preceded by Sir John Newman	Member of Parliament for Finchley; 1923 – 1924	Succeeded by Sir Edward Cadogan
