= Betty Williams (politician) =

Welsh Labour politician (born 1944)

Member of Parliament for Conwy
- In office 1 May 1997 – 12 April 2010
- Preceded by: Wyn Roberts
- Succeeded by: Constituency abolished

Personal details
- Born: Betty Helena Williams; 31 July 1944 (age 82) Bangor, Caernarfonshire, Wales
- Party: Labour
- Spouse: Evan Williams
- Children: 2
- Education: University of Wales, Bangor

Betty Helena Williams (née Williams; born 31 July 1944) is a Welsh Labour politician, who was the Member of Parliament for Conwy from 1997 to 2010.

== Early life ==
Williams was born in St David's Hospital, Bangor, Gwynedd, Wales. She attended Ysgol Dyffryn Nantlle in Penygroes, near Caernarfon, and also attended Bangor Normal College.

Her political career began in 1967 when she was elected to become a member of the Llanllyfni Parish Council. She proceeded to serve as a district councillor, and more recently in 1990 as Mayor of Arfon.

Williams is a former chair of a community centre, as well as a former Christian Aid and Meals on Wheels organiser, and an Honorary Fellow of the University of Wales, Bangor. She worked as a secretary and freelance journalist.

== Parliamentary career ==
Williams contested Caernarfon in 1983 and Conwy in 1987 and 1992. In 1995, she was again selected to stand for election for Labour in Conwy, though this time through an all-women shortlist.

She was a member of the Parliamentary Labour Party committees on education and employment; health and social services, and culture, media and sport. In 2009 she supported Carwyn Jones in the election for First Minister, strongly criticising his opponent Edwina Hart for dismissing suggestions that the First Minister needed to be able to speak the Welsh language. Williams said: "I think it's important that we have someone who is bilingual as First Minister of Wales, like we've had with Rhodri who can conduct interviews through the medium of Welsh or English."

She was also a member of the All-Party Parliamentary Groups in the House of Commons covering children in Wales, primary headache disorders, maternity, multiple sclerosis and vaccine-damaged children.

In September 2008, Williams announced that she would not be contesting her parliamentary seat at the 2010 general election. She stated that this was due to her wanting to 'change the balance' of her workload.

== Personal life ==
Williams was married to Evan Williams with two sons; Williams is both her married and maiden name. She has a BA from the University of Wales. Her interests include opera and sheepdog trials. Her husband Evan died on 10 April 2020 of complications of COVID-19, after twice being tested negative for the disease.

Parliament of the United Kingdom
Preceded by Wyn Roberts	Member of Parliament for Conwy; 1997–2010	Constituency abolished
