= 1987 Dissolution Honours =

British government recognitions

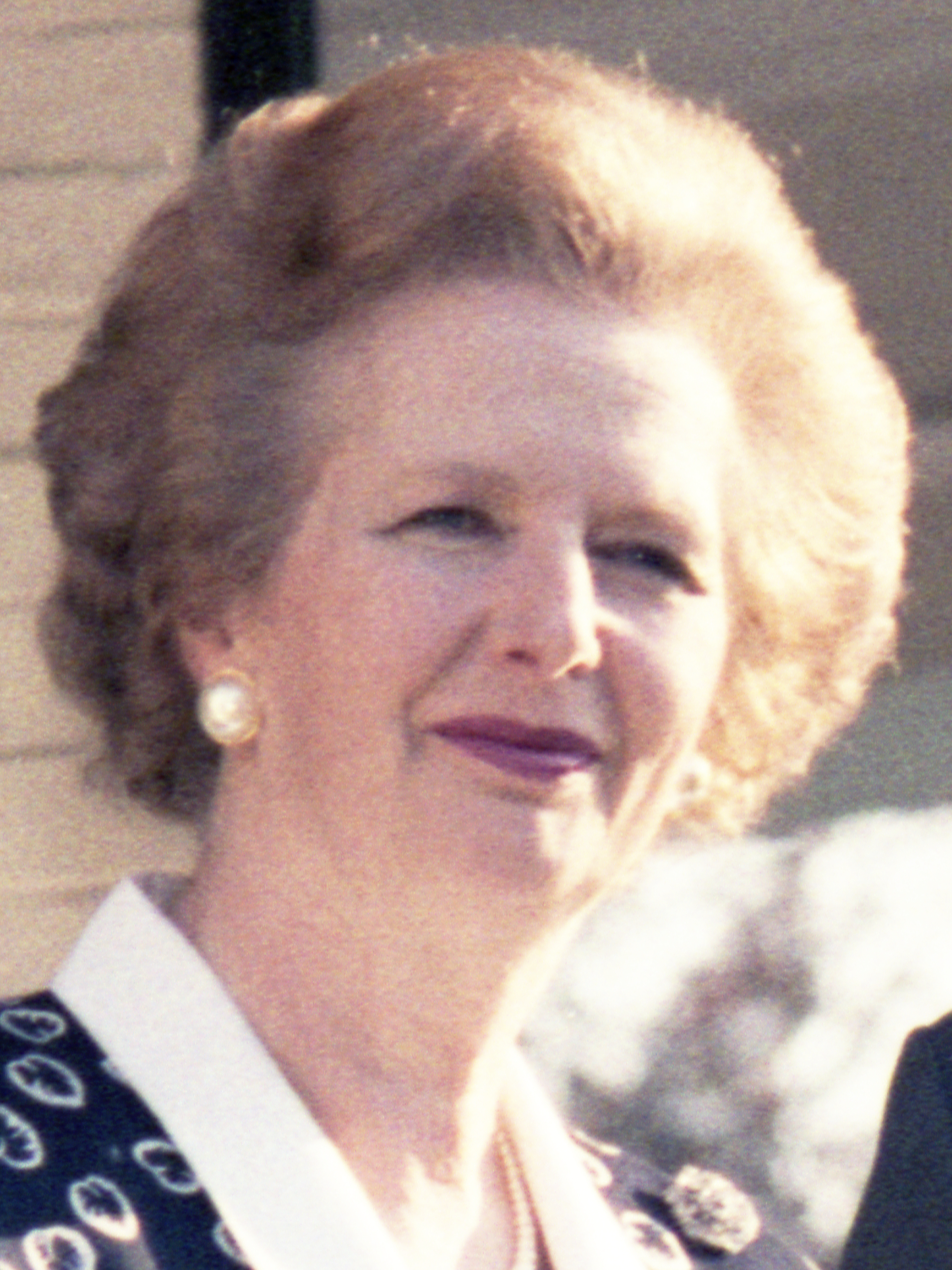
Prime Minister Margaret Thatcher pictured in 1987

The 1987 Dissolution Honours List was gazetted on 30 July 1987 following the advice of the Prime Minister, Margaret Thatcher.

The recipients are shown below as they were styled before their new honour.

== Life Peers ==
=== Conservative ===
- Rt Hon. Sir Humphrey Edward Gregory Atkins KCMG, Member of Parliament for Merton and Morden 1955–70; Spelthorne 1970–87. Lord Privy Seal and Deputy Foreign Secretary 1981–82. Secretary of State, Northern Ireland 1979–81. Parliamentary Secretary to the Treasury and Chief Whip 1973–74. Opposition Chief Whip 1974–79.
- Rt Hon. Mark Carlisle QC DL, Member of Parliament for Runcorn 1964–83; Warrington South 1983–87. Secretary of State for Education and Science 1979–81. Minister of State, Home Office 1972–74. Under Secretary of State, Home Department 1970–72.
- Rt Hon. Roger Nicholas Edwards, Member of Parliament for Pembroke 1970–87. Secretary of State for Wales 1979–87.
- Rt Hon. Charles Patrick Fleeming Jenkin, Member of Parliament for Wanstead and Woodford 1964–87. Secretary of State for the Environment 1983–85. Secretary of State for Industry 1981–83. Secretary of State for Social Services 1979–81. Minister for Energy 1974. Chief Secretary to the Treasury 1972–74. Financial Secretary to the Treasury 1970–72.
- Rt Hon. Sir Keith Sinjohn Joseph Bt CH, Member of Parliament for Leeds North East 1956–87. Secretary of State for Education and Science 1981–86. Secretary of State for Industry 1979–81. Secretary of State for Social Services 1970–74. Minister of Housing and Local Government and Welsh Affairs 1962–64. Minister of State, Board of Trade 1961–62.
- Rt Hon. James Michael Leathes Prior, Member of Parliament for Lowestoft 1959–83; Waveney 1983–87. Secretary of State for Northern Ireland 1981–84. Secretary of State for Employment 1979–81. Lord President of the Council and Leader of the House of Commons 1972–74.
- Rt Hon. Francis Leslie Pym MC DL, Member of Parliament for Cambridgeshire 1961–83; Cambridgeshire South East 1983–87. Secretary of State for Foreign & Commonwealth Affairs 1982–83. Lord President of the Council and Leader of the House of Commons 1981–82. Chancellor of the Duchy of Lancaster and Paymaster General 1981. Secretary of State for Defence 1979–81. Secretary of State for Northern Ireland 1973–74. Parliamentary Secretary to the Treasury and Government Chief Whip 1970–73.
- Rt Hon. Peter Wynford Innes Rees QC, Member of Parliament for Dover 1970–74 and 1983–87; Dover and Deal 1974–83. Chief Secretary to the Treasury 1983–85. Minister for Trade 1981–83. Minister of State, HM Treasury 1979–81.
- Rt Hon. Aubrey Geoffrey Frederick Rippon QC, Member of Parliament for Norwich South 1955–64; Hexham 1966–87. Secretary of State for the Environment 1972–74. Chancellor of the Duchy of Lancaster 1970–72. Minister of Technology 1970. Minister of Public Building and Works 1962–64.
- Rt Hon. Norman Antony Francis St John-Stevas, Member of Parliament for Chelmsford 1964–87. Chancellor of the Duchy of Lancaster and Leader of the House of Commons 1979–81. Minister of State for the Arts 1973–74. Parliamentary Under Secretary of State, Department of Education & Science 1972–73.
- Rt Hon. Peter John Mitchell Thomas QC, Member of Parliament for Conway 1951–66; Hendon South 1970–87. Secretary of State for Wales 1970–74. Minister of State, Foreign Affairs 1963–64. Parliamentary Under Secretary of State, Foreign Office 1961–63

=== Labour ===
- Rt Hon. Sir Leonard James Callaghan KG, Member of Parliament for South Cardiff 1945–50; South East Cardiff 1950–83; Cardiff South and Penarth 1983–87. Prime Minister and First Lord of the Treasury 1976–79. Leader of the Opposition 1979–80. Secretary of State for Foreign & Commonwealth Affairs 1974–76. Secretary of State for the Home Department 1967–70. Chancellor of the Exchequer 1964–67.
- Rt Hon. Michael Francis Lovell Cocks, Member of Parliament for Bristol South 1970–87. Opposition Chief Whip 1979–85. Parliamentary Secretary to the Treasury and Government Chief Whip 1976–79. Assistant Government Whip 1974–76.
- John Donkin Dormand, Member of Parliament for Easington 1970–87. Lord Commissioner, H.M. Treasury 1974–79. Assistant Government Whip 1974.
- Rt Hon. Dame Judith Constance Mary Hart DBE, Member of Parliament for Lanark Division of Lanarkshire 1959–83; Clydesdale 1983–87. Minister for Overseas Development 1977–79. Minister of Overseas Development 1969–70, 1974–75. Paymaster–General 1968–69. Minister of Social Security 1967–68. Minister of State, Commonwealth Office 1966–67. Joint Parliamentary Under Secretary of State for Scotland 1964–66.
- Rt Hon. Douglas Patrick Thomas Jay, Member of Parliament for Battersea North 1946–74; Wandsworth, Battersea North 1974–83. President of the Board of Trade 1964–67. Financial Secretary to the Treasury 1950–51. Economic Secretary to the Treasury 1947–50.
- Rt Hon. Roy Mason, Member of Parliament for Barnsley 1953–83; Barnsley Central 1983–87. Secretary of State for Northern Ireland 1976–79. Secretary of State for Defence 1974–76. President of the Board of Trade 1969–70. Minister of Power 1968–69. Postmaster-General 1968. Minister of Defence (Equipment) 1967–68. Minister of State (Shipping), Board of Trade 1964–67.

=== Liberal ===
- Rt Hon. Roy Harris Jenkins, Member of Parliament for Central Southwark 1948–50; Stechford Birmingham 1950–76; Glasgow Hillhead 1982–87. Chancellor of the Exchequer 1967–70. Home Secretary 1965–67, 1974–76. Minister of Aviation 1964–65.
- Stephen Sherlock Ross, Member of Parliament for the Isle of Wight 1974–83.

== Knights Bachelor ==
- Clement Raphael Freud, Member of Parliament for Isle of Ely 1973–83; Cambridgeshire North East 1983–87.
- Albert McQuarrie, Member of Parliament for Aberdeenshire East 1979–83; Banff and Buchan 1983–87.
- Tom Normanton TD, Member of Parliament for Cheadle 1970–87; Member of European Parliament for Cheshire East since 1979.
- Rt Hon. Reginald Ernest Prentice, Member of Parliament for East Ham North 1957–74; Newham North East 1974–79; Daventry 1979–87. Minister of State, Department of Health & Social Security 1979–81.

== Member of the Order of the Companions of Honour ==
- The Rt Hon. Norman Beresford Tebbit MP, Member of Parliament for Epping 1970–74; Chingford since 1974. Chancellor of the Duchy of Lancaster 1985–87. Secretary of State for Trade and Industry 1983–85. Secretary of State for Employment 1981–83. Minister of State for Industry 1981. Parliamentary Under-Secretary of State, Department of Trade 1979–81.
