= Elwyn Jones (solicitor) =

Welsh solicitor and Labour politician (1904–1989)

Member of Parliament for Conway
- In office 23 February 1950 – 25 October 1951
- Preceded by: constituency established
- Succeeded by: Peter Thomas

Personal details
- Born: 24 February 1914
- Died: 4 July 1989 (aged 75) Anglesey
- Party: Labour

Sir William Elwyn Edwards Jones (5 January 1904 – 4 July 1989) was a Welsh solicitor and Labour politician elected as Labour MP for Conway in 1950. He was narrowly defeated by the Conservative candidate Peter Thomas in 1951 and was unsuccessful in his attempt to regain the seat in 1955.

William Elwyn Edwards Jones was born in Caernarfon, the son of Rev Robert William Jones, a Methodist minister, and his wife, Elizabeth. He was educated at Bottle Secondary School and Ffestiniog Grammar School and the University College of North Wales, Bangor and the University of London.

He served as town clerk of Bangor from 1939 to 1969. He served as a member of the National Parks Commission from 1966 to 1968, and of the Countryside Commission for Wales from 1968 to 1971. He was knighted in 1978.

== Marriage ==
In 1936, Jones married, Dyddgu, the daughter of Reverend Dr Edward Tegla Davies. The couple had three children, one son and two daughters. They lived at 23 Glyngarth Court, Glyngarth, Menai Bridge.

== Death ==
Sir Elwyn Jones died at Anglesey, aged 85.

Parliament of the United Kingdom
New constituency	Member of Parliament for Conway; 1950–1951	Succeeded by Peter Thomas
