= Ednyfed Hudson Davies =

British politician (1929–2018)

Member of Parliament for Caerphilly
- In office 3 May 1979 – 9 June 1983
- Preceded by: Alfred Evans
- Succeeded by: Ron Davies

Member of Parliament for Conway
- In office 31 March 1966 – 18 June 1970
- Preceded by: Peter Thomas
- Succeeded by: Wyn Roberts

Personal details
- Born: 4 December 1929 Llanelli, Wales
- Died: 11 January 2018 (aged 88)
- Political party: Labour (before 1981); Social Democratic Party (after 1981)

Gwilym Ednyfed Hudson-Davies (4 December 1929 – 11 January 2018), known as Ednyfed Hudson Davies, was a Welsh politician and Member of Parliament (MP).

== Biography ==
He was born in Llanelli, the son of Ebenezer Curig Davies and his wife Enid (née Hughes). They moved to Bangor when Ednyfed was a child. Although both sets of grandparents were Welsh speaking, differences in dialect sometimes made communication difficult.

Hudson Davies was educated at Dynevor Grammar School, Swansea, the University College, Wales in Swansea, and Balliol College, Oxford. He became a lecturer in government and a broadcaster. Davies was elected Labour Party MP for Conway in 1966, serving there until 1970. He was later elected for Caerphilly, in 1979. In 1981, he was among the Labour MPs who defected to the new Social Democratic Party.

In 1983, in Caerphilly, it was the Liberal side of the SDP-Liberal Alliance which put up a candidate. Davies therefore did not stand in Caerphilly, but was adopted in Basingstoke, having moved to the New Forest after marrying Amanda Barker-Mill in 1972. He lost comprehensively as it was then a strongly Conservative seat. The Liberals also did not win in Caerphilly, which was regained for the Labour Party by future Secretary of State for Wales Ron Davies.

Hudson-Davies remained active in public life as chairman of a museum trust in the New Forest in the south of England.

His first marriage ended in divorce in 1994 and in 2016 he married Sue Owen. He had twin daughters from his first marriage and a stepdaughter from his second.

He died on 11 January 2018, aged 88.

Parliament of the United Kingdom
Preceded by Peter Thomas	Member of Parliament for Conway; 1966–1970	Succeeded by Wyn Roberts
Preceded by Fred Evans	Member of Parliament for Caerphilly; 1979–1983	Succeeded by Ron Davies
