= Conwy (UK Parliament constituency) =

UK Parliament constituency (1950–2010)

Coordinates: 53.191°N 3.688°W

- Former county constituency for the House of Commons
- Boundary of Conwy in Wales for the 2005 general election
- Preserved county: Clwyd, Gwynedd
- Major settlements: Conwy, Bangor, Llandudno

1950–2010
- Seats: One
- Created from: Caernarvon Boroughs and Caernarvonshire
- Replaced by: Aberconwy

Conwy (Conway prior to 1983) was an electoral constituency represented in the House of Commons of the Parliament of the United Kingdom. It returned one Member of Parliament (MP) by the single-member district plurality (also known as first-past-the-post) system of voting.

The constituency was created for the 1950 general election, and abolished for the 2010 general election.

== History ==
It was a marginal between the Conservative Party and the Labour Party throughout its existence.

The Conwy Welsh Assembly constituency was created with the same boundaries as the Conwy House of Commons constituency in 1999.

== Boundaries ==
The constituency was, geographically, relatively small for its region, as it followed and tended to keep to the coast, taking in parts of two separate densely populated coastal conurbations.

As well as the walled castle town of Conwy from which it bore its name, the constituency mainly comprised the popular holiday resort and retail centre of Llandudno to the east, and the city of Bangor, which is home to the University of Wales, Bangor, to the west. It also included the smaller coastal towns of Penmaenmawr and Llanfairfechan, as well as some sparser inland areas including former slate-quarrying communities in the Ogwen Valley.

The constituency, notably, did not include Colwyn Bay (or outlying Rhos-on-Sea), which forms part of a coastal conurbation (and the Conwy county borough) with Llandudno and its outlying town of Penrhyn Bay—both in the constituency; this area comes under the constituency of Clwyd West to the east. Nor did it include the town of Caernarfon—just southwest of Bangor—which was in a constituency of the same name.

The constituency was also bordered by Meirionnydd Nant Conwy to the south, and the insular constituency of Ynys Mon to the west.

Following the decisions of the Welsh Boundary Commission, the Conwy seat was significantly altered, forming the base of a new Aberconwy constituency established for the 2010 general election. Part of the constituency (notably Bangor) became part of the new Arfon constituency.

== Profile ==
Although the constituency included a student population from the university, most of the voters were towards the older end of the age spectrum as it was a popular retirement area. The constituency was also linguistically diverse, with mainly English speakers in the east and mainly Welsh speakers in the west and inland areas.

== Members of Parliament ==
The last MP was Betty Williams of the Labour Party, who held the seat from 1997 (when she gained 35.04% of the vote—a 9.4% swing from the Conservatives) until its abolition in 2010. Williams increased her share of the vote in 2001 (by 6.8%), but it was reduced in 2005 (by 4.7%). She is also the first female MP to hold the seat. The seat was previously held (since its renaming in 1983) by Sir Wyn Roberts for the Conservative Party, who was first elected for Conway, the old anglicised name of the constituency, in 1970.

Election	Member	Party
1950	Elwyn Jones	Labour
1951	Peter Thomas	Conservative
1966	Ednyfed Hudson Davies	Labour
1970	Wyn Roberts	Conservative
1997	Betty Williams	Labour
2010	Constituency abolished: see Aberconwy	

== Elections ==
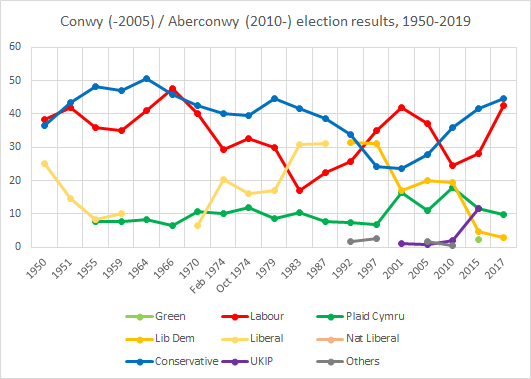
Election results since 1950

=== Elections in the 1950s ===
General election 1950: Conway
Party	Candidate	Votes	%	±%
Labour	Elwyn Jones	15,176	38.4	
Conservative	David Price-White	14,373	36.4	
Liberal	Emlyn Hooson	9,937	25.2	
Majority		803	2.0	
Turnout		39,486	84.6	
Labour win (new seat)				

General election 1951: Conway
Party	Candidate	Votes	%	±%
Conservative	Peter Thomas	17,115	43.4	+7.0
Labour	Elwyn Jones	16,532	41.9	+4.5
Liberal	Emlyn Hooson	5,791	14.7	−10.5
Majority		583	1.5	N/A
Turnout		39,438	84.9	+0.3
Conservative gain from Labour		Swing		

General election 1955: Conway
Party	Candidate	Votes	%	±%
Conservative	Peter Thomas	18,705	48.2	+4.8
Labour	Elwyn Jones	13,881	35.8	−6.1
Liberal	Herbert Mostyn Lewis	3,217	8.2	−6.5
Plaid Cymru	Ioan Bowen Rees	3,019	7.8	New
Majority		4,824	12.4	+11.9
Turnout		38,822		
Conservative hold		Swing		

General election 1959: Conway
Party	Candidate	Votes	%	±%
Conservative	Peter Thomas	17,795	47.1	−1.1
Labour	Silvan Jones	13,260	35.1	−0.7
Liberal	John H. Bellis	3,845	10.2	+2.0
Plaid Cymru	Ioan Bowen Rees	2,852	7.6	−0.2
Majority		4,535	12.0	−0.4
Turnout		37,752		
Conservative hold		Swing		

=== Elections in the 1960s ===
General election 1964: Conway
Party	Candidate	Votes	%	±%
Conservative	Peter Thomas	18,753	50.6	+3.5
Labour	Gwilym Roberts	15,234	41.1	+6.0
Plaid Cymru	Gwilym Hughes	3,058	8.3	+0.7
Majority		3,519	9.5	−2.5
Turnout		37,045	80.3	
Conservative hold		Swing		

General election 1966: Conway
Party	Candidate	Votes	%	±%
Labour	Ednyfed Davies	18,203	47.5	+6.4
Conservative	Peter Thomas	17,622	45.9	−4.7
Plaid Cymru	Robert E. Jones	2,552	6.6	−1.7
Majority		581	1.6	N/A
Turnout		38,377	83.7	+3.4
Labour gain from Conservative		Swing		

=== Elections in the 1970s ===
General election 1970: Conway
Party	Candidate	Votes	%	±%
Conservative	Wyn Roberts	16,927	42.4	−3.5
Labour	Ednyfed Davies	16,024	40.2	−7.3
Plaid Cymru	Dafydd Elis-Thomas	4,311	10.8	+4.2
Liberal	Elfyn Lloyd Morris	2,626	6.6	New
Majority		903	2.2	N/A
Turnout		48,662	82.0	−1.7
Conservative gain from Labour		Swing		

General election February 1974: Conway
Party	Candidate	Votes	%	±%
Conservative	Wyn Roberts	16,763	40.2	−2.2
Labour	David Benjamin Rees	12,214	29.3	−10.9
Liberal	David Thomas Jones	8,546	20.4	+13.8
Plaid Cymru	Pryce Michael Farmer	4,203	10.1	−0.7
Majority		4,549	10.9	+8.7
Turnout		41,726	81.2	−0.8
Conservative hold		Swing		

General election October 1974: Conway
Party	Candidate	Votes	%	±%
Conservative	Wyn Roberts	15,614	39.6	−0.6
Labour	David Benjamin Rees	12,808	32.5	+3.2
Liberal	David Thomas Jones	6,344	16.1	−4.3
Plaid Cymru	Pryce Michael Farmer	4,668	11.8	+1.7
Majority		2,806	7.1	−3.8
Turnout		39,434	76.2	−5.0
Conservative hold		Swing		

General election 1979: Conway
Party	Candidate	Votes	%	±%
Conservative	Wyn Roberts	18,142	44.7	+5.1
Labour	Gerson Wyn Davies	12,069	29.8	−2.7
Liberal	Roger Roberts	6,867	16.9	+0.8
Plaid Cymru	Emyr Price	3,497	8.6	−3.2
Majority		6,073	14.9	+7.8
Turnout		40,575	79.0	+2.8
Conservative hold		Swing		

=== Elections in the 1980s ===
General election 1983: Conwy
Party	Candidate	Votes	%	±%
Conservative	Wyn Roberts	16,413	41.7	−1.5
Liberal	Roger Roberts	12,145	30.8	+12.6
Labour	Ira Walters	6,731	17.1	−12.0
Plaid Cymru	Dafydd Iwan	4,105	10.4	+0.8
Majority		4,268	10.8	−4.2
Turnout		39,394	76.4	−2.6
Conservative hold		Swing		

General election 1987: Conwy
Party	Candidate	Votes	%	±%
Conservative	Wyn Roberts	15,730	38.7	−3.0
Liberal	Roger Roberts	12,706	31.2	+0.4
Labour	Betty Williams	9,049	22.3	+5.2
Plaid Cymru	Rhodri Davies	3,177	7.8	−2.6
Majority		3,024	7.5	−3.3
Turnout		40,662	77.8	+1.4
Conservative hold		Swing		

=== Elections in the 1990s ===
General election 1992: Conwy
Party	Candidate	Votes	%	±%
Conservative	Wyn Roberts	14,250	33.7	−5.0
Liberal Democrats	Roger Roberts	13,255	31.4	+0.2
Labour	Betty Williams	10,883	25.8	+3.5
Plaid Cymru	Rhodri Davies	3,108	7.4	−0.4
Ind. Conservative	Owen Wainwright	637	1.5	New
Natural Law	David Hughes	114	0.3	New
Majority		995	2.3	−5.2
Turnout		42,247	78.7	+0.9
Conservative hold		Swing	−2.5	

General election 1997: Conwy
Party	Candidate	Votes	%	±%
Labour	Betty Williams	14,561	35.0	+9.2
Liberal Democrats	Roger Roberts	12,965	31.2	−0.2
Conservative	David Jones	10,085	24.3	−9.4
Plaid Cymru	Rhodri Davies	2,844	6.8	−0.6
Referendum	Allan Barham	760	1.8	New
Independent	Richard Bradley	250	0.6	New
Natural Law	David Hughes	95	0.2	−0.1
Majority		1,596	3.8	N/A
Turnout		41,560	75.4	−3.3
Labour gain from Conservative		Swing	+9.3	

=== Elections in the 2000s ===
General election 2001: Conwy
Party	Candidate	Votes	%	±%
Labour	Betty Williams	14,366	41.8	+6.8
Conservative	David Logan	8,147	23.7	−0.6
Liberal Democrats	Victoria MacDonald	5,800	16.9	−14.3
Plaid Cymru	Ann Owen	5,665	16.5	+9.7
UKIP	Allan Barham	388	1.1	New
Majority		6,219	18.1	+14.3
Turnout		34,366	62.9	−12.5
Labour hold		Swing	+3.7	

In the 2005 general election, the seat was the 81st easiest seat for the Liberal Democrats to gain, and the 153rd easiest seat for the Conservative Party to gain. The Labour Party did not include the seat on its list of vulnerable seats and eventually held the seat (with a reduced proportion of the vote).

General election 2005: Conwy
Party	Candidate	Votes	%	±%
Labour	Betty Williams	12,479	37.1	−4.7
Conservative	Guto Bebb	9,398	27.9	+4.2
Liberal Democrats	Gareth Roberts	6,723	20.0	+3.1
Plaid Cymru	Paul Rowlinson	3,730	11.1	−5.4
Green	Jim Killock	512	1.5	New
Socialist Labour	David Jones	324	1.0	New
UKIP	Ken Khambatta	298	0.9	−0.2
Legalise Cannabis	Tim Evans	193	0.6	New
Majority		3,081	9.2	−8.9
Turnout		33,723	62.6	−0.3
Labour hold		Swing	−4.5	

- Official declaration of result of the poll (in PDF)

== See also ==
- List of parliamentary constituencies in Clwyd
- List of parliamentary constituencies in Gwynedd
