= John Crowder =

British Conservative Party politician (1890–1961)

John Crowder MP

Member of Parliament for Finchley
- In office 14 November 1935 – 1959
- Preceded by: Edward Cadogan
- Succeeded by: Margaret Thatcher

Personal details
- Born: John Frederick Ellenborough Crowder; 10 November 1891
- Died: 9 July 1961 (aged 69)
- Party: Conservative
- Education: Eton College; Christ Church, Oxford

Sir John Frederick Ellenborough Crowder (10 November 1891 – 9 July 1961) was a Conservative Party politician in the United Kingdom. He was the member of parliament (MP) for Finchley from the 1935 general election until the 1959 general election, when he was succeeded by Margaret Thatcher (who later became British Prime Minister).

== Biography ==
Crowder was educated at Eton College and Christ Church, Oxford. He worked as an underwriter and elected a member at Lloyd's of London. He served with the Lincolnshire Yeomanry from 1914 to 1918, when he transferred to the Reserve Regiment of the Royal Horse Guards. He served again during World War II, as a staff captain and army welfare officer.

Crowder served as a Hampshire County Councillor 1931-46 and a Fleet Urban District Councillor 1933–46. He was vice-chairman of the Aldershot and North Hants Conservative Association from 1930.

He won Finchley in 1935 by a majority of 18,040 over Thomas Robertson, who had been Liberal MP for the seat 1923–24. In Parliament, Crowder was an influential member of the 1922 Committee and Second Church Estates Commissioner.

His son Petre Crowder also became a Member of Parliament.

He appears as a character in The Long Walk to Finchley, on Thatcher's selection to succeed him as Conservative candidate for his seat – he is played, in a less than flattering yet accurate light, by Geoffrey Palmer.

Parliament of the United Kingdom
Preceded by Edward Cadogan	Member of Parliament for Finchley; 1935–1959	Succeeded by Margaret Thatcher
