= Mike Freer =

British politician (born 1960)

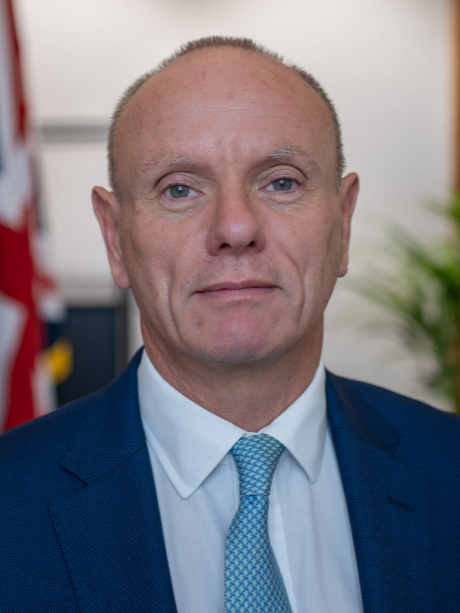
- Official portrait, 2021

Parliamentary Under-Secretary of State for Courts and Legal Services (Note: As Parliamentary Under-Secretary of State for Constitution and Legal Services from September to October 2022. He assumed responsibilities for Courts from Gareth Johnson.)
- In office 20 September 2022 – 5 July 2024
- Prime Minister: Liz Truss; Rishi Sunak
- Preceded by: Office established
- Succeeded by: Heidi Alexander

Parliamentary Under-Secretary of State for Exports
- In office 16 September 2021 – 6 July 2022
- Prime Minister: Boris Johnson
- Preceded by: Graham Stuart
- Succeeded by: Andrew Griffith

Parliamentary Under-Secretary of State for Equalities
- In office 16 September 2021 – 6 July 2022
- Prime Minister: Boris Johnson
- Preceded by: Office established
- Succeeded by: Amanda Solloway

Comptroller of the Household
- In office 16 December 2019 – 16 September 2021
- Prime Minister: Boris Johnson
- Preceded by: Jeremy Quin
- Succeeded by: Marcus Jones

Lord Commissioner of the Treasury
- In office 26 July 2018 – 16 December 2019
- Prime Minister: Theresa May; Boris Johnson
- Preceded by: Andrew Stephenson
- Succeeded by: Iain Stewart

Member of Parliament for Finchley and Golders Green
- In office 6 May 2010 – 30 May 2024
- Preceded by: Rudi Vis
- Succeeded by: Sarah Sackman

Leader of Barnet London Borough Council
- In office 16 May 2006 – 15 December 2009
- Preceded by: Brian Salinger
- Succeeded by: Lynne Hillan

Member of Barnet London Borough Council for Finchley Church End
- In office 2 May 2002 – 6 May 2010

Member of Barnet London Borough Council for St Paul’s
- In office 3 May 1990 – 5 May 1994

Personal details
- Born: Michael Whitney Freer; 29 May 1960 (age 66) Manchester, England
- Party: Conservative
- Spouse: Angelo Crolla (m. 2015)
- Website: www.mikefreer.com

Michael Whitney Freer (born 29 May 1960) is a British Conservative Party politician and former banker who served as Parliamentary Under-Secretary of State for Courts and Legal Services from September 2022 to July 2024. He was first elected as the Member of Parliament (MP) for the constituency of Finchley and Golders Green at the 2010 general election, and stood down in 2024.

Freer is a former leader of Barnet Council and a former councillor for the St Paul's and Finchley Church End wards.

== Early life and career ==
Michael Whitney Freer was born in Manchester on 29 May 1960. Part of his childhood was spent in a council house, which was then bought by his parents following the Conservative government's Right to Buy policy. He was educated at the Chadderton Grammar School for Boys and subsequently at St Aidan's County High School (now Richard Rose Central Academy) in Carlisle. He read accountancy and business law at the University of Stirling but did not graduate with a degree.

Freer worked for a number of fast-food chains, including Pizzaland, Pizza Hut and KFC, prior to a management career in the financial sector. Freer worked for Barclays Bank as an "Area Performance Manager".

== Local government ==
Freer was first elected to Barnet Council in 1990 as a Conservative for the St Paul's ward, winning the seat from Labour. However, he lost the seat back to Labour in 1994 and went on to lose in the East Finchley ward in 1998. He was re-elected to the council, for the Finchley Church End ward, in 2002. He was unanimously elected leader of the council by his party on 11 May 2006, replacing Brian Salinger as Conservative group leader, having previously been Salinger's deputy.

Following the collapse of Icelandic banks Glitnir and Landsbanki in October 2008 in which Barnet Council had invested £27.4m of council taxpayers' money, Freer was named Private Eye's "Banker of the Year" in its Rotten Borough Awards of 2008. The money was subsequently recovered.

In 2009, Freer announced a new model of local government delivery for the London Borough of Barnet, called "Future Shape" which he stated could save Barnet Council £24 million a year. The scheme has been dubbed easyCouncil because of its similarity to easyJet's business model.

== Parliamentary career ==
In the 2005 general election, Freer contested Harrow West, coming second with 38.3% of the vote behind the incumbent Labour MP Gareth Thomas.

At the 2010 general election, Freer was elected to Parliament as MP for Finchley and Golders Green with 46% of the vote and a majority of 5,809. He was re-elected as MP for Finchley and Golders Green at the 2015 general election with an increased vote share of 50.9% and a decreased majority of 5,662. At the snap 2017 general election, Freer was again re-elected, with a decreased vote share of 47% and a decreased majority of 1,657. He was again re-elected at the 2019 general election, with a decreased vote share of 43.8% and an increased majority of 6,562.

=== Positions ===
Freer was appointed Parliamentary Private Secretary to the Secretary of State for Transport following the 2015 general election, and served in this post until the 2017 general election.

On 15 June 2017, Freer was appointed as an Assistant Government Whip. In July 2018, he was appointed Lord Commissioner of the Treasury, before being promoted to Comptroller of the Household in December 2019 in the second Johnson ministry.

On 16 September 2021, Freer was appointed Parliamentary Under-Secretary of State for Exports at the Department for International Trade during the cabinet reshuffle. He resigned on 6 July 2022 in protest over Boris Johnson's leadership. In his resignation letter, he accused Johnson's government of "creating an atmosphere of hostility for LGBT+ people."

In the House of Commons he has sat on the Work and Pensions Committee, the Scottish Affairs Committee and the Housing, Communities and Local Government Committee.

=== Views ===
Freer is a member of Conservative Friends of Israel (CFI). Although he is not Jewish, The Jewish Chronicle in 2008 ranked him 99th in its list of 100 most powerful influences on the Jewish community. In 2014, Freer resigned as parliamentary private secretary to Nick Boles in order to vote against a backbench motion recognising Palestine as a state alongside Israel, arguing "the two-state solution we all want to see should be the end not the start of the process".

In January 2016, the Labour Party unsuccessfully proposed an amendment in Parliament that would have required private landlords to make their homes "fit for human habitation". According to Parliament's register of interests, Freer was one of 72 Conservative MPs who voted against the amendment who personally derived an income from renting out property. The Conservative Government had responded to the amendment that they believed homes should be fit for human habitation but did not want to pass the new law that would explicitly require it.

Freer was opposed to Brexit prior to the 2016 referendum. On 1 April 2019 he was one of fifteen Conservative MPs to vote in favour of a People's Vote – a second referendum on the UK's membership of the European Union.

He was a vocal defender of the Prime Minister Theresa May after she and the Conservative Party received criticism for her role in the Windrush scandal in 2018. After a constituent wrote to him complaining about the Conservative Party's role in the scandal, he responded that it was nothing to do with the party and that they should not believe 'misrepresentations' from the Labour Party.

=== Other events ===
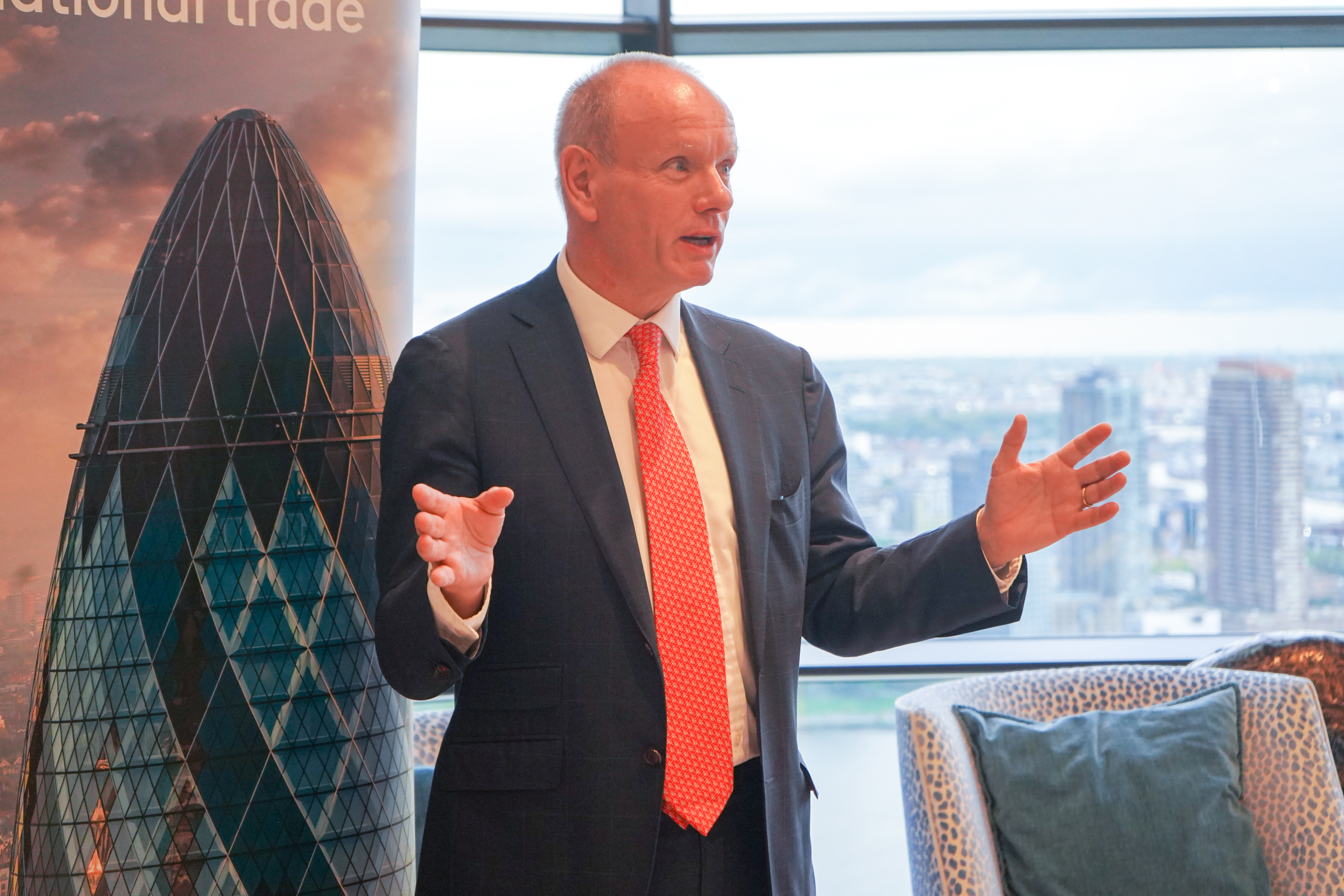
Freer speaking at the British Consul Residence in New York City in 2023

In October 2011, Freer was the target of "a disturbance" at a constituency surgery in a mosque in his constituency of Finchley by members of Muslims Against Crusades.

In October 2019, Freer hosted a crocus planting ceremony in memory of the 1.5 million children who were murdered in the Holocaust, which was attended by around 100 members of the local community. Chair of the local constituency Labour Party Matt Staples subsequently claimed that Freer had "politicised" the event by not inviting "representatives from across the political spectrum".

In April 2022, after the conviction of Ali Harbi Ali for the murder of David Amess, Freer revealed that he had been told by anti-terrorism police that Ali had visited his constituency office on 17 September 2021. Freer would normally have been at the office, but was not there as he was attending other meetings. Freer upgraded his security arrangements following the incident.

In December 2023, Freer's constituency office was the target of a suspected arson attack. In January 2024, he announced that he would not seek re-election at the 2024 general election citing concerns over his personal safety from Muslims Against Crusades, Ali Harbi Ali and the arson attack on his constituency office. A homeless man, Paul Harwood, later admitted to arson at a shed at the property and a bin of a nearby restaurant; his barrister asserted that the offences were "not in any way politically motivated or targeted". Detectives said that it was not being treated as a hate crime.

== Personal life ==
Freer is gay, which he revealed to fellow MPs during a speech in the debates over the Marriage (Same Sex Couples) Act 2013.

He lives with his husband, Angelo Crolla, in Finchley, north London. He entered into a civil partnership in January 2007. On the eighth anniversary of their civil partnership, in January 2015, they converted it into a marriage.

== Notes ==
Parliament of the United Kingdom
| Preceded by Rudi Vis | Member of Parliament for Finchley and Golders Green; 2010–2024 | Succeeded by Sarah Sackman |
