= London North (European Parliament constituency) =

Former European Parliament constituency

- European Parliament constituency
- Boundary within London (1979-1984)
- Member state: United Kingdom
- Created: 1979
- Dissolved: 1999
- MEPs: 1

Prior to its uniform adoption of proportional representation in 1999, the United Kingdom used first-past-the-post for the European elections in England, Scotland and Wales. The European Parliament constituencies used under that system were smaller than the later regional constituencies and only had one Member of the European Parliament each.

The constituency of London North was one of them.

When it was created in England in 1979, it consisted of the Westminster Parliament constituencies of Edmonton, Enfield North, Finchley, Hornsey, Islington Central, Islington North, Islington South and Finsbury, Southgate, Tottenham, and Wood Green.

United Kingdom Parliamentary constituencies were redrawn in 1983 and the European constituencies were altered to reflect this. The new seat comprised the following Westminster constituencies: Chipping Barnet, Edmonton, Enfield North, Enfield Southgate, Finchley, Hendon North, Hendon South, Hornsey and Wood Green, and Tottenham. These boundaries were used in 1984, 1989 and 1994.

Boundary within South East England and London (1984-1994)

Boundary within South East England and London (1994-1999)

== Members of the European Parliament ==
Elected	Members	Party
1979	John Marshall	Conservative
1984	John Marshall	Conservative
1989	Pauline Green	Labour
1994	Pauline Green	Labour
1999	Constituency abolished: see London	

== Election results ==
European Parliament election, 1979: London North
Party	Candidate	Votes	%	±%
Conservative	John Marshall	74,042	49.7	N/A
Labour	K. W. Little	59,077	39.7	N/A
Liberal	Laurence S. Brass	15,838	10.6	N/A
Majority		14,965	10.0	N/A
Turnout		148,957	28.5	N/A
Conservative win (new seat)				

European Parliament election, 1984: London North
Party	Candidate	Votes	%	±%
Conservative	John Marshall	74,846	41.4	▼8.3
Labour	Ernest G. Large	69,993	38.7	▼1.0
Liberal	James S. Skinner	31,344	17.3	▲6.7
Ecology	Peter S. I. Lang	4,682	2.6	N/A
Majority		4,853	2.7	▼7.4
Turnout		180,865	32.0	▲3.5
Conservative hold		Swing	▼3.7	

European Parliament election, 1989: London North
Party	Candidate	Votes	%	±%
Labour	Pauline Green	85,536	41.2	▲2.5
Conservative	R. M. (Bob) Lacey	79,699	38.3	▼3.0
Green	Simon A. Clarke	30,807	14.8	▲12.2
SLD	Miss Hilary F. Leighter	8,917	4.3	▼13.0
Independent	P. K. Burns	2,016	1.0	N/A
Communist	Miss Lorna M. Reith	850	0.4	N/A
Majority		5,837	2.8	▲0.1
Turnout		207,825	36.3	▲4.3
Labour gain from Conservative		Swing	▲2.7	

European Parliament election, 1994: London North
Party	Candidate	Votes	%	±%
Labour	Pauline Green	102,059	55.5	▲14.3
Conservative	Michael G. Keegan	53,711	29.2	▼9.2
Liberal Democrats	Ian Henderson Mann	15,739	8.6	▲4.3
Green	Mrs. Hilary J. Jago	5,666	3.1	▼11.7
UKIP	Ian N. Booth	5,099	2.8	N/A
European People's Party Judaeo-Christian Alliance	Giovanni B. Fabrizi	880	0.5	N/A
Natural Law	Jonathan R. Hinde	856	0.5	N/A
Majority		48,348	26.3	▲23.5
Turnout		184,010	34.0	▼2.3
Labour hold		Swing	▲11.7	
