= Edward Cadogan (politician) =

British politician (1880-1962)

The Honourable Sir Edward Cecil George Cadogan KBE, CB
- Cadogan in 1931

Member of Parliament for Reading
- In office 1922–1923
- Preceded by: Leslie Wilson
- Succeeded by: Somerville Hastings

Member of Parliament for Finchley
- In office 1924–1935
- Preceded by: Thomas Robertson
- Succeeded by: Sir John Crowder

Member of Parliament for Bolton
- In office 1940–1945 Serving with Sir Cyril Entwistle
- Preceded by: Sir John Haslam; Sir Cyril Entwistle
- Succeeded by: John Jones; John Lewis

Personal details
- Born: 15 November 1880
- Died: 13 September 1962 (aged 81)
- Party: Conservative
- Parents: 5th Earl Cadogan (father); Beatrix Craven (mother)
- Relatives: Henry Cadogan (brother); Gerald Cadogan (brother); William Cadogan (brother); Alexander Cadogan (brother); William Brownlow (brother-in-law); Samuel Scott (brother-in-law); 2nd Earl Craven (maternal grandfather)
- Education: Eton College
- Alma mater: Balliol College, Oxford
- Military career
- Allegiance: United Kingdom
- Branch: British Army; Royal Air Force
- Service years: 1914-1918; 1939-1945
- Rank: Major
- Unit: Suffolk Yeomanry
- Conflicts: World War I; World War II

Sir Edward Cecil George Cadogan, KBE, CB (15 November 1880 – 13 September 1962) was a British, Conservative politician.

Cadogan was a younger son of the 5th Earl Cadogan and his wife, Beatrix, a daughter of the 2nd Earl Craven. He was educated at Eton and Balliol College, Oxford before training as a barrister.

From 1911 to 1921, he was Secretary to the Speaker of the House of Commons, James Lowther and also fought in World War I as a Major in the Suffolk Yeomanry. Lowther retired in 1921 and Cadogan was awarded the CB that year. A year later, he entered the Commons as Member of Parliament (MP) for Reading in 1922. He subsequently represented the seats of Finchley and Bolton and was a member of the Indian Statutory Commission from 1927 to 1930.

Cadogan was interested in penal reform, and particularly in the problems of young offenders. He chaired a committee which unanimously recommended abolishing the sentence of whipping (except in prisons), a provision adopted by Home Secretary James Chuter Ede in the Criminal Justice Act 1948. He was knighted in 1939 and fought with the RAF during World War II. He died unmarried and childless in 1962.

Parliament of the United Kingdom
Preceded by Leslie Wilson	Member of Parliament for Reading; 1922–1923	Succeeded by Somerville Hastings
Preceded by Thomas Robertson	Member of Parliament for Finchley; 1924–1935	Succeeded by Sir John Crowder
Preceded by Sir John Haslam and Sir Cyril Entwistle	Member of Parliament for Bolton; 1940–1945; With: Sir Cyril Entwistle	Succeeded by John Jones and John Lewis
