= Peter Thomas, Baron Thomas of Gwydir =

British politician

The Right Honourable The Lord Thomas of Gwydir PC QC
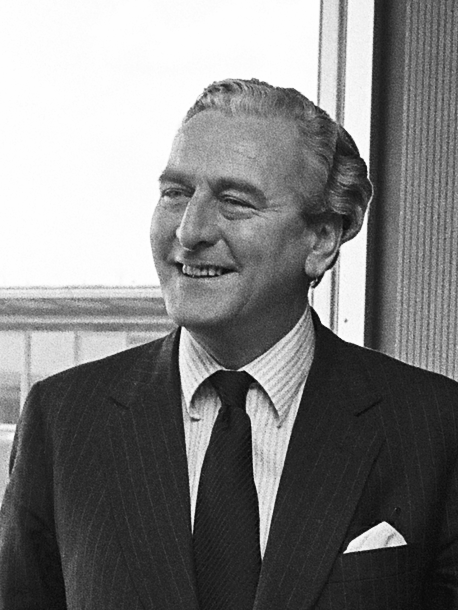
- Thomas in 1973

Secretary of State for Wales
- In office 19 June 1970 – 5 March 1974
- Prime Minister: Edward Heath
- Preceded by: George Thomas (no relation)
- Succeeded by: John Morris

Chairman of the Conservative Party
- In office 20 June 1970 – 7 April 1972
- Preceded by: Anthony Barber
- Succeeded by: The Lord Carrington

Member of the House of Lords
- Lord Temporal
- Life peerage 7 October 1987 – 4 February 2008
Parliamentary offices
Member of Parliament for Hendon South
In office 18 June 1970 – 18 May 1987
Preceded by	Hugh Lucas-Tooth
Succeeded by	John Marshall
Member of Parliament for Conway
In office 25 October 1951 – 10 March 1966
Preceded by	Elwyn Jones
Succeeded by	Ednyfed Hudson Davies

Personal details
- Born: Peter John Mitchell Thomas; 31 July 1920 Llanrwst, Wales
- Died: 4 February 2008 (aged 87)
- Party: Conservative
- Spouse: Tessa Dean (m. 1947; died 1985)
- Children: 4
- Education: Jesus College, Oxford

Peter John Mitchell Thomas, Baron Thomas of Gwydir, PC, QC (31 July 1920 – 4 February 2008) was a British Conservative politician. He was the first Welshman to become Chairman of the Conservative Party, serving from 1970 to 1972, and the first Conservative to serve as Secretary of State for Wales, holding that office from 1970 to 1974.

== Early life and career ==
Thomas was born in Llanrwst, where his father was a solicitor. He was educated at the village school, and then Epworth College in Rhyl, before reading law at Jesus College, Oxford. He joined the Royal Air Force (RAF) in 1939, on the outbreak of the Second World War. He was shot down while serving as a bomber pilot in 1941, and spent four years in prisoner-of-war camps in Germany, moving from Stalag Luft VI to Stalag Luft III and then at Stalag XI-B. He continued his legal studies while imprisoned, and was also an amateur actor.

He became a barrister after the war, and was called to the Bar in 1947 at Middle Temple. He practised on the Wales and Chester circuit, and took silk in 1965. He became deputy chairman of Cheshire quarter sessions in 1966, and then of Denbighshire quarter sessions in 1968, serving in both offices until 1970. He was a Crown Court recorder from 1974 to 1988, and also sat as an arbitrator on the Court of Arbitration of the International Chamber of Commerce in Paris.

He was bilingual in Welsh and English, and took an active part in the Gorsedd, attending Eisteddfodau under the bardic name Pedr Conwy (Welsh: Peter from Conway).

== Marriage ==
He married Tessa Dean in 1947. She was the daughter of actor, film, and theatrical producer Basil Dean and his wife, Lady Mercy Greville. His wife died in 1985, and he outlived both of their two sons. He was survived by his two daughters upon his death in February 2008 at the age of 87.

== Political career ==
Thomas was elected to Parliament as MP for Conway in 1951, winning a narrow majority in the marginal seat over the Labour incumbent. He turned down the position of Under-Secretary of State for Wales at the Home Office to concentrate on his legal career but later served as Parliamentary private secretary to Sir Harry Hylton-Foster (the Solicitor General and later Speaker) from 1954 to 1959. He was a member of the Council of Europe from 1957 to 1959, and sponsored the private members bill that became the Eisteddfod Act 1959.

He served as Parliamentary Secretary at the Ministry of Labour 1959–61, taking charge of the measures that abolished the requirements for employees to be paid in cash and the maximum wage for a professional footballer (£14 per week in November 1960). He moved to become Under-Secretary of State at the Foreign Office in 1961, travelling to Moscow with Lord Home in 1963 to sign the Nuclear Test Ban Treaty. He was promoted to Minister of State for Foreign Affairs in 1963, and was sworn of the Privy Council in the Queen's Birthday Honours of 1964, but left office when his party lost the 1964 general election. In opposition, he was a spokesman on foreign affairs and then law from 1965 to 1966. Although he had held his Conway seat (and steadily increased his majority) since 1951, he narrowly lost to Labour at the 1966 general election, but returned as MP for Hendon South at the general election in June 1970, a position which he held until retiring in 1987.

During the whole of Edward Heath's premiership, he held the position of Secretary of State for Wales. He was Secretary of State during a period of violent activism by proponents of the Welsh language, including bombings and a campaign by the Cymdeithas yr Iaith Gymraeg (Welsh Language Society) to remove English road signs. In February 1971, paralleling plans to reorganise local government in England, Thomas announced the plans to replace the existing 181 local councils with 7 new county councils counties and 36 district councils. An extra county council was added later, for Cardiff. Thomas also served as Chairman of the Conservative Party between 1970 and 1972.

Thomas remained Welsh spokesman after the Conservative Party lost the general election in February 1974, but left the front bench when Margaret Thatcher became party leader in February 1975. He became active on backbench committees, and was president of the Conservative Friends of Israel. He retired from the House of Commons at the 1987 general election, and was raised to the peerage for life in the Dissolution Honours that year, gazetted as Baron Thomas of Gwydir, of Llanrwst in the County of Gwynedd.

== Arms ==
Coat of arms of Peter Thomas, Baron Thomas of Gwydir

Crest
A grassy mount Proper statant thereon a stag armed and unguled Or resting the dexter foreleg upon a staff raguly also Or and between the attires a cross egrailed Gold.
Escutcheon
Per pale Vert and Gules in pale a sword point upwards Argent hilt pommels and quillons Or between in chief two portcullises also or all within a bordure engrailed of the last thereon eight pellets.
Supporters
Dexter, a dragon statant erect tail nowed Gules gorged with a crown rayonny Gold; Sinister, a lamb statant erect Or gorged with a crown rayonny Gules.
Motto
Nac Anobeithier

Parliament of the United Kingdom
Preceded by Elwyn Jones	Member of Parliament for Conway; 1951–1966	Succeeded by Ednyfed Hudson Davies
Preceded by Sir Hugh Lucas-Tooth	Member of Parliament for Hendon South; 1970–1987	Succeeded by John Marshall
Political offices
Preceded by Anthony Barber	Chairman of the Conservative Party; 1970–1972	Succeeded by Lord Carrington
Preceded by George Thomas	Secretary of State for Wales; 1970–1974	Succeeded by John Morris
