= Finchley and Golders Green =

UK Parliament constituency (since 1997)

Coordinates: 51.59°N 0.18°W

- Borough constituency for the House of Commons
- Interactive map of boundaries from 2024
- Location within Greater London
- County: Greater London
- Electorate: 75,761 (March 2020)
- Major settlements: Finchley, Hampstead Garden Suburb, Golders Green and Cricklewood

Current constituency
- Created: 1997
- Member of Parliament: Sarah Sackman (Labour)
- Seats: One
- Created from: Finchley, Hendon South

Finchley and Golders Green is a constituency created in 1997. It is represented in the House of Commons of the UK Parliament by Sarah Sackman of the Labour Party.

== Boundaries ==
=== Historic ===
The constituency has included the following wards:

1997–2010: The London Borough of Barnet wards of Childs Hill, East Finchley, Finchley, Garden Suburb, Golders Green, St Paul's, and Woodhouse.

2010–2024: The London Borough of Barnet wards of Childs Hill, East Finchley, Finchley Church End, Garden Suburb, Golders Green, West Finchley, and Woodhouse.

=== From 2024 ===
Further to the 2023 review of Westminster constituencies, which came into effect for the 2024 general election, the constituency is composed of:

- The London Borough of Barnet wards of Childs Hill, Cricklewood, East Finchley, Finchley Church End, Garden Suburb, Golders Green, West Finchley and Woodhouse.

== Constituency ==
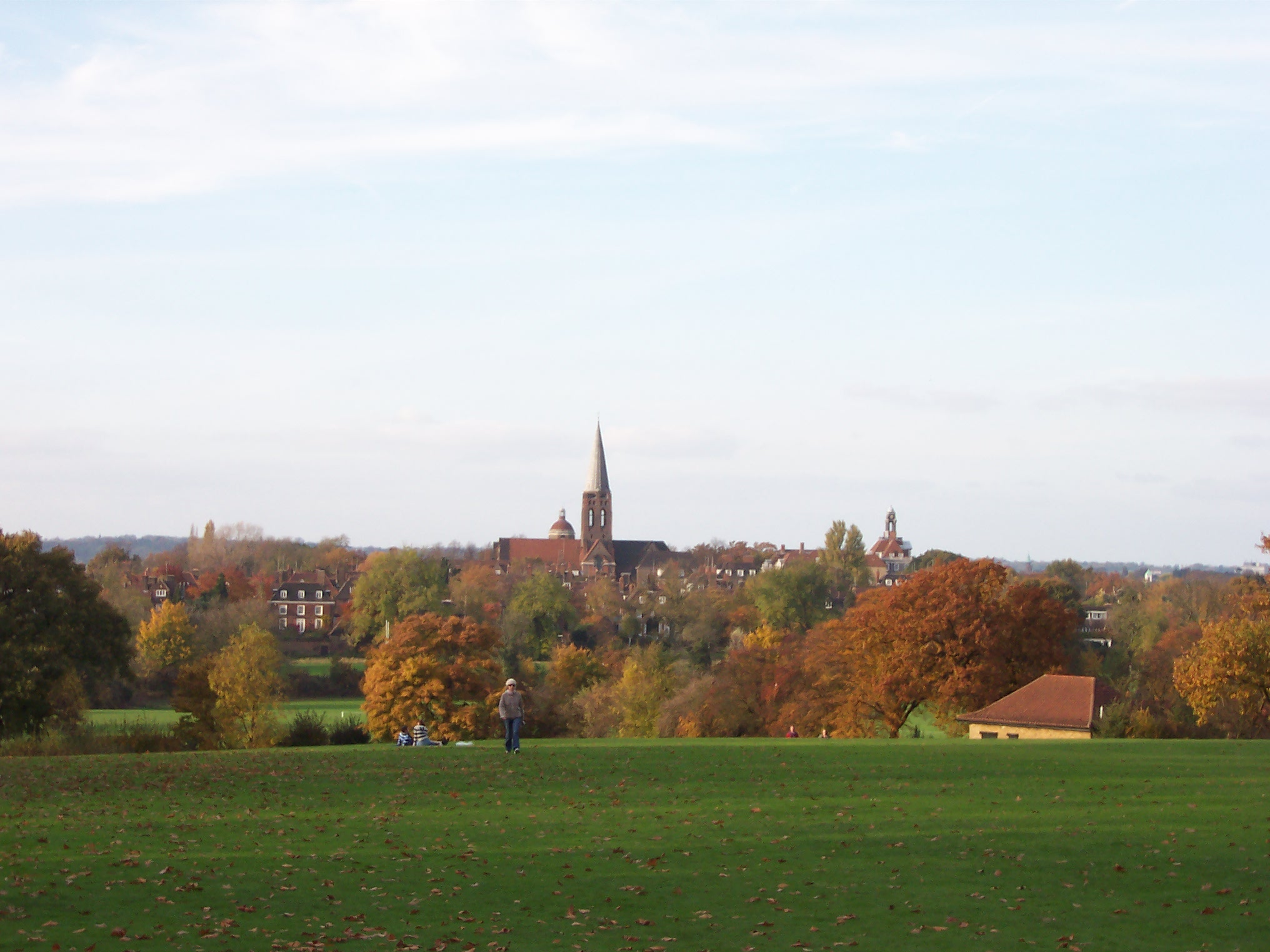
Hampstead Garden Suburb viewed from the Hampstead Heath Extension in Finchley & Golders Green, within the constituency.

People living in the constituency have incomes, car ownership rates, qualifications and occupational levels, that are higher than London averages. Poverty (as of 2023) and child poverty levels (as of 2024) are lower than the national average. Census results from 2021 show that 52% are homeowners, and that 68% are ABC1 in terms of social grade. In addition, 56% of people are either Christian or atheists, 22.8% are Jewish and 12% are Muslim.

== Members of Parliament ==
In 1997, Rudi Vis was elected when he defeated John Marshall. Mike Freer was subsequently elected in 2010, before resigning in 2024 after receiving death threats and an arson incident occurring at his constituency office. At the 2024 general election Sarah Sackman was elected, after defeating Alex Deane, to represent people living in the constituency.

Event	Member	Party
1997	Rudi Vis	Labour
2010	Mike Freer	Conservative
2024	Sarah Sackman	Labour

== Elections ==
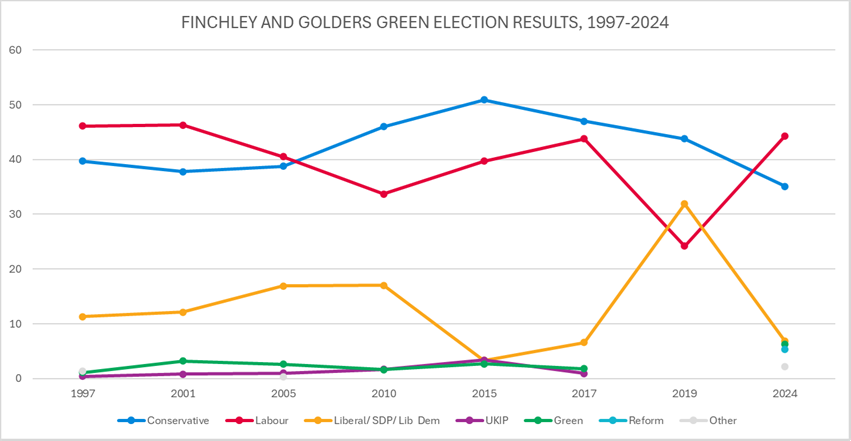
Election results 1974-2024

=== Elections in the 2020s ===
General election 2024: Finchley and Golders Green
Party	Candidate	Votes	%	±%
Labour	Sarah Sackman	21,857	44.3	+19.9
Conservative	Alex Deane	17,276	35.1	–8.7
Liberal Democrats	Sarah Hoyle	3,375	6.8	–25.0
Green	Steve Parsons	3,107	6.3	N/A
Reform	Bepi Pezzulli	2,598	5.3	N/A
Rejoin EU	Brendan Donnelly	486	1.0	N/A
Party of Women	Katharine Murphy	318	0.6	N/A
Independent	Michael Shad	272	0.6	N/A
Majority		4,581	9.2	N/A
Turnout		49,289	63.6	–9.5
Registered electors		77,500		
Labour gain from Conservative		Swing	+14.3	

=== Elections in the 2010s ===
2019 notional result
Party	Vote	%
Conservative	24,267	43.8
Liberal Democrats	17,638	31.8
Labour	13,500	24.4
Turnout	55,412	73.1
Electorate	75,761	

General election 2019: Finchley and Golders Green
Party	Candidate	Votes	%	±%
Conservative	Mike Freer	24,162	43.8	−3.1
Liberal Democrats	Luciana Berger	17,600	31.9	+25.3
Labour	Ross Houston	13,347	24.2	−19.6
Majority		6,562	11.9	+8.7
Turnout		55,109	71.0	−0.4
Registered electors		77,573		
Conservative hold		Swing	−14.2	

General election 2017: Finchley and Golders Green
Party	Candidate	Votes	%	±%
Conservative	Mike Freer	24,599	47.0	−3.9
Labour	Jeremy Newmark	22,942	43.8	+4.1
Liberal Democrats	Jonathan Davies	3,463	6.6	+3.3
Green	Adele Ward	919	1.8	−0.9
UKIP	Andrew Price	462	0.9	−2.5
Majority		1,657	3.2	−8.0
Turnout		52,389	71.4	+1.4
Registered electors		73,329		
Conservative hold		Swing	−4.0	

General election 2015: Finchley and Golders Green
Party	Candidate	Votes	%	±%
Conservative	Mike Freer	25,835	50.9	+4.9
Labour	Sarah Sackman	20,173	39.7	+6.0
UKIP	Richard King	1,732	3.4	+1.7
Liberal Democrats	Jonathan Davies	1,662	3.3	−13.7
Green	Adele Ward	1,357	2.7	+1.1
Majority		5,662	11.2	−1.1
Turnout		50,759	70.0	+8.9
Registered electors		72,530		
Conservative hold		Swing	−0.6	

General election 2010: Finchley and Golders Green
Party	Candidate	Votes	%	±%
Conservative	Mike Freer	21,688	46.0	+6.2
Labour	Alison Moore	15,879	33.7	−5.4
Liberal Democrats	Laura Edge	8,036	17.0	−0.1
UKIP	Susan Cummins	817	1.7	+0.6
Green	Donald Lyven	737	1.6	−1.0
Majority		5,809	12.3	+11.6
Turnout		47,157	66.7	+3.9
Registered electors		70,722		+5.6
Conservative notional hold		Swing	+5.8	

=== Elections in the 2000s ===
2005 notional result
Party	Vote	%
Conservative	16,692	39.8
Labour	16,398	39.1
Liberal Democrats	7,186	17.1
Green	1,092	2.6
UKIP	461	1.1
Others	110	0.3
Turnout	41,939	62.8
Electorate	66,793	

General election 2005: Finchley and Golders Green
Party	Candidate	Votes	%	±%
Labour	Rudi Vis	17,487	40.5	−5.8
Conservative	Andrew Mennear	16,746	38.8	+1.0
Liberal Democrats	Susan Garden	7,282	16.9	+4.8
Green	Noel Lynch	1,136	2.6	−0.6
UKIP	Jeremy Jacobs	453	1.0	+0.2
Rainbow Dream Ticket	Rainbow George Weiss	110	0.3	N/A
Majority		741	1.7	−6.8
Turnout		43,214	61.9	+4.6
Registered electors		70,000		
Labour hold		Swing	−3.4	

General election 2001: Finchley and Golders Green
Party	Candidate	Votes	%	±%
Labour	Rudi Vis	20,205	46.3	+0.2
Conservative	John Marshall	16,489	37.8	−1.9
Liberal Democrats	Sarah Teather	5,266	12.1	+0.8
Green	Miranda Dunn	1,385	3.2	+2.1
UKIP	John de Roeck	330	0.8	+0.4
Majority		3,716	8.5	+2.1
Turnout		43,675	57.3	−12.4
Registered electors		76,178		
Labour hold		Swing	+1.1	

=== Elections in the 1990s ===
General election 1997: Finchley and Golders Green
Party	Candidate	Votes	%	±%
Labour	Rudi Vis	23,180	46.1	+15.2
Conservative	John Marshall	19,991	39.7	–15.0
Liberal Democrats	Jonathan M. Davies	5,670	11.3	–1.5
Referendum	Gary Shaw	684	1.4	N/A
Green	Ashley Gunstock	576	1.1	N/A
UKIP	David N.G. Barraclough	205	0.4	N/A
Majority		3,189	6.4	N/A
Turnout		50,306	69.7	–4.0
Registered electors		72,357		+1.8
Labour gain from Conservative		Swing	+15.1	

1992 notional result
Party	Vote	%
Conservative	28,623	54.7
Labour	16,149	30.9
Liberal Democrats	6,690	12.8
Others	821	1.6
Turnout	52,283	73.6
Electorate	71,081	

== See also ==
- Finchley (constituency) and Hendon South, predecessor seats
- Parliamentary constituencies in London
