= D. Ben Rees =

Welsh historian and minister (born 1937)

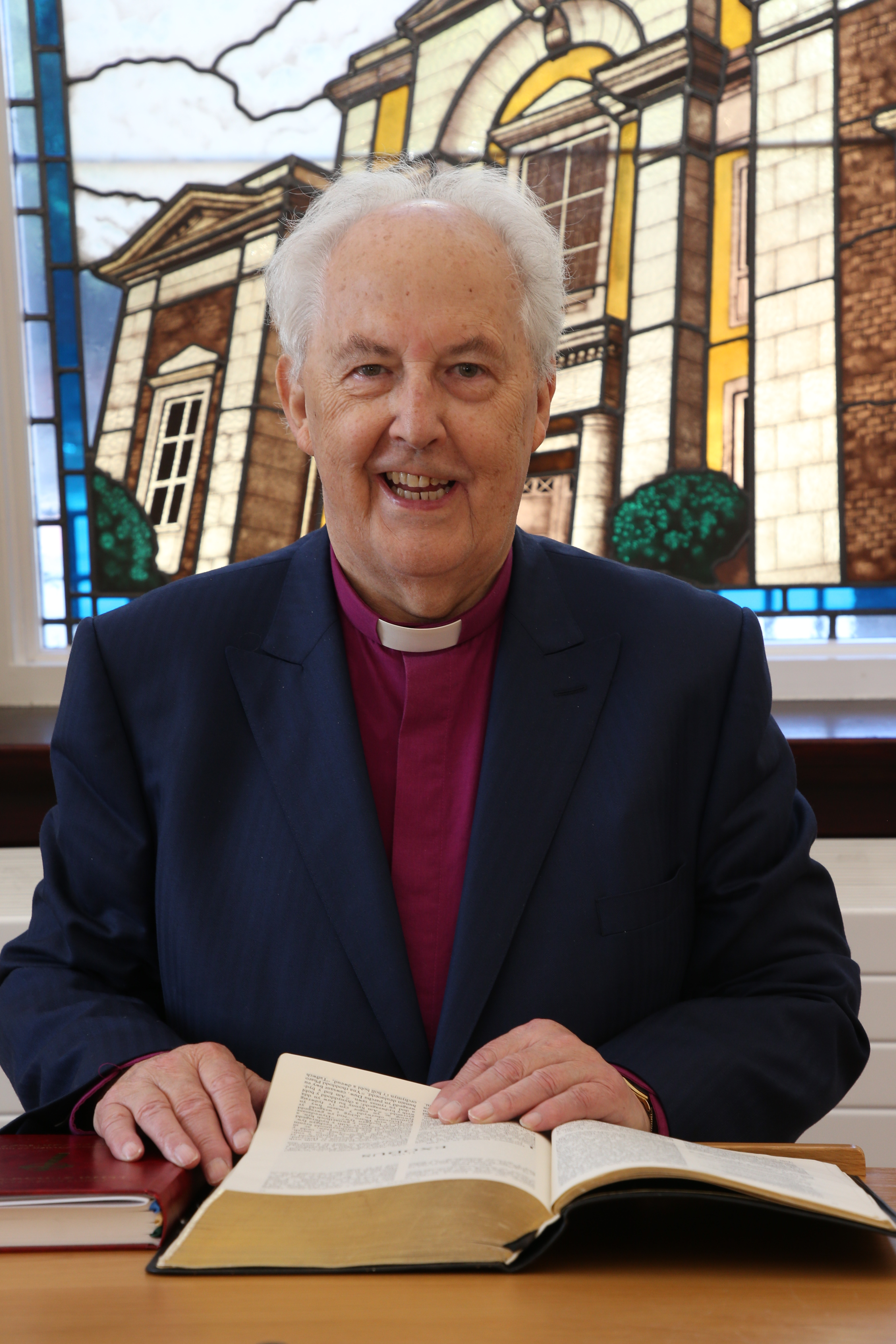
- Born: David Benjamin Rees; August 1, 1937 (age 88); Llanddewi Brefi, Ceredigion, Wales
- Other names: D. Ben Rees
- Education: University of Wales, Aberystwyth (BA); United Theological College, Aberystwyth (BD)
- Occupations: Historian, author, publisher, Presbyterian minister
- Years active: 1962–present
- Known for: Liverpool Welsh community leadership, historical writing on Welsh Nonconformity
- Notable work: The Welsh in Liverpool: A Remarkable History (2021); Chapels in the Valley (1975)
- Spouse: Meinwen Llewellyn
- Children: 2 (Dafydd and Hefin Ednyfed)
- Awards: Paul Harris Fellowship (2003); Liverpool Citizen of Honour (2018)

David Benjamin Rees (born 1937) is a Welsh historian, author, publisher and minister in the Presbyterian Church of Wales. He has served as a community leader within Liverpool's Welsh population and operates Modern Welsh Publications, a Welsh language publishing house established in 1963.

== Early life and education ==
Rees was born on 1 August 1937 in Llanddewi Brefi, Ceredigion. He attended the local primary school before proceeding to Tregaron Grammar School.

In 1955, he entered the University of Wales, Aberystwyth, where he studied history, Welsh and education. During his time at university, he was involved in student politics and the peace movement, including the local Campaign for Nuclear Disarmament branch.

In 1959, Rees was accepted into the United Theological College, Aberystwyth to pursue theological studies leading to a BD degree.

== Ministry ==
Rees was ordained as a Presbyterian minister in October 1962. His early ministry was in the South Wales valleys, including Abercynon and Penrhiwceiber. Following the Aberfan disaster of 21 October 1966, he was involved in supporting affected families as a member of the Aberfan Disaster Committee.

In 1968, Rees moved to Liverpool as minister at Bethel Chapel, a Welsh-speaking Presbyterian congregation. He served as chaplain at the Royal Liverpool University Hospital for 18 years. In 1972, he was president of the Merseyside Free Church Council.

Rees officially retired in 2008 but continued part-time ministerial duties until 2021.

== Publishing and academic work ==
=== Modern Welsh Publications ===
In 1963, Rees established Modern Welsh Publications Ltd, initially operating from Abercynon before relocating to Liverpool in 1968. The company publishes works in Welsh and English.

=== Academic positions ===
Rees has held lecturing positions with the University of Liverpool Extra Mural Department and the Open University. He served as a board member for the Greenwich School of Theology.

=== Historical research ===
Rees completed an MSc thesis on Welsh Nonconformity, published as Chapels in the Valley: A Study in the Sociology of Welsh Nonconformity (1975). His MA thesis from the University of Liverpool examined Dr Owen Thomas, a Liverpool Welsh divine.

From the 1980s, Rees focused on the history of the Liverpool Welsh community, producing multiple volumes on the subject.

== Community involvement ==
=== Welsh community leadership ===
Rees has been described as a leader within Liverpool's Welsh community. He established various Welsh cultural organisations in Liverpool, including the Merseyside Chair Eisteddfod and the Council of Welsh Chapels on Merseyside, and founded the local community newspaper Yr Angor/The Anchor, which he edited from 1979.

=== Peace activism ===
Rees has been involved in peace movements since his university days, including the Campaign for Nuclear Disarmament and the Fellowship of Reconciliation. He served as chairman of the Fellowship of Reconciliation publications committee for thirty years.

=== Rotary International ===
Rees has been a member of Rotary clubs in Liverpool and was made an honorary member of the City of Liverpool Rotary Club in 2021. He was awarded the Paul Harris Fellowship in 2003.

=== Honours and recognition ===
In 2018, Rees was made a Citizen of Honour for the City of Liverpool, recognising his contribution to the city's Welsh community.

=== Selected publications ===
Rees has authored or edited over 80 books in Welsh and English over six decades. Notable works include:

- Mahatma Gandhi: Pensaer yr India (1970)
- Chapels in the Valley: A Study in the Sociology of Welsh Nonconformity (1975)
- Pregethwr y Bobl: Bywyd a Gwaith Dr Owen Thomas (1979)
- The Liverpool Welsh and their Religion (co-authored with R. Merfyn Jones, 1984)
- The Welsh of Merseyside series (1997–2001)
- A Life Unlimited: An Autobiography (2018)
- The Welsh in Liverpool: A Remarkable History (2021)
- Hanes Tregaron a'r Cyffiniau (2022)

=== Themes and subjects ===
Rees has written extensively on Welsh Nonconformity, the Liverpool Welsh community, and biographies of prominent Welsh political figures including Jim Griffiths and Cledwyn Hughes. His theological works include studies of John Calvin and Calvinism.

One of his works on the Liverpool Welsh was longlisted for Wales Book of the Year in 2020.

== Personal life ==
Rees married Meinwen Llewellyn and has two sons, Dafydd and Hefin Ednyfed. His son Hefin co-founded the charity Generating Hope in Action.
