= Finchley (constituency) =

Parliamentary constituency in the United Kingdom, 1918–1997

- Former borough constituency for the House of Commons
- County: 1918–1965 Middlesex; 1965–1997 Greater London

1950–1997
- Seats: One
- Replaced by: Finchley and Golders Green (newly created seat); Chipping Barnet (in part)

1918–1950
- Seats: One
- Type of constituency: County constituency
- Created from: Hornsey (bulk of seat formed former western part of); Enfield (as to the Friern Barnet part)

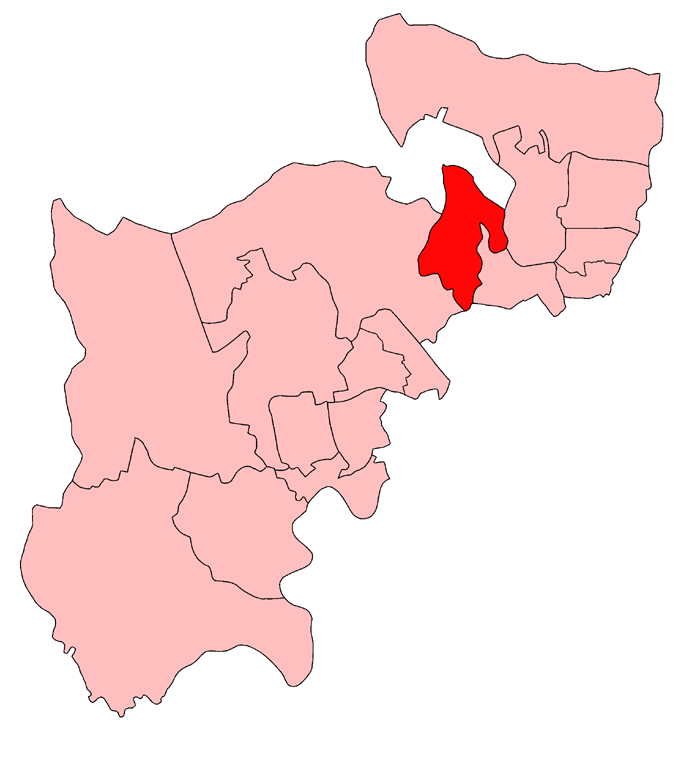
Finchley within the parliamentary county of Middlesex, boundaries used 1918–1945

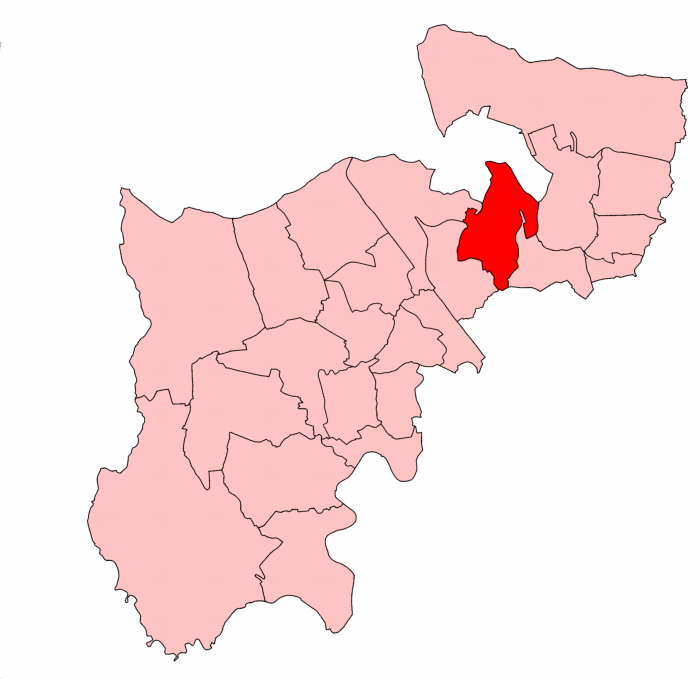
Finchley within the parliamentary county of Middlesex, boundaries used 1945–1950

Map that gives each named seat and any constant electoral success for national (Westminster) elections for Middlesex, 1955 to 1974.

Finchley was a constituency represented in the House of Commons of the Parliament of the United Kingdom. It elected one Member of Parliament (MP) by first-past-the-post voting; its longest-serving and best-known MP was Margaret Thatcher, Prime Minister from 1979 to 1990.

Although boundary changes meant that she never again attained the large majority by which she won in 1959, her constituents nonetheless returned her by comfortable (9,000) majorities at general elections throughout her premiership.

The seat was abolished in 1997 and split between the Finchley and Golders Green and Chipping Barnet constituencies.

== Boundaries ==
- 1918–1945: The Urban Districts of Finchley and Friern Barnet.
- 1945–1950: The Municipal Borough of Finchley, part of the Municipal Borough of Hornsey, and part of the Urban District of Friern Barnet.
- 1950–1974: The Municipal Borough of Finchley, and the Urban District of Friern Barnet.
- 1974–1997: The London Borough of Barnet wards of East Finchley, Finchley, Friern Barnet, St Paul's, and Woodhouse.

In 1918 the constituency was created as a county division of Middlesex, centred on the town of Finchley, which before 1918 had been located in the Hornsey constituency. In 1934 the Finchley district became a Municipal Borough.

In 1945 there was an interim redistribution of parliamentary constituencies to split those with more than 100,000 electors, prior to the general redistribution of 1950. Middlesex was significantly affected by the interim changes.

In 1950 the seat was re-classified as a borough constituency, with the boundaries reverting to those of 1918.

In 1965 the area of the constituency changed counties from Middlesex to London. Specifically its areas joined with others to form the London Borough of Barnet of Greater London.

== Members of Parliament ==
Event	Member	Party
1918	John Newman	Unionist
1923	Atholl Robertson	Liberal
1924	Edward Cadogan	Unionist
1935	John Crowder	Conservative
1959	Margaret Thatcher	Conservative
1992	Hartley Booth	Conservative
1997	constituency abolished	

== Elections ==
=== Elections in the 1910s ===
General election 1918: Finchley
Party		Candidate	Votes	%	±%
C	Unionist	John Pretyman Newman	11,849	68.9	
	Labour	John Leslie	3,140	18.2	
	Liberal	Walter Edwin Martin	2,221	12.9	
Majority			8,709	50.7	
Turnout			17,210	59.7	
Registered electors			28,848		
	Unionist win (new seat)				
C indicates candidate endorsed by the coalition government.

=== Elections in the 1920s ===
General election 1922: Finchley
Party	Candidate	Votes	%	±%
Unionist	John Pretyman Newman	11,883	53.2	−15.7
Liberal	T. Atholl Robertson	10,440	46.8	+33.9
Majority		1,443	6.4	−44.3
Turnout		22,323	72.4	+12.7
Registered electors		30,843		
Unionist hold		Swing	−24.8	

General election 1923: Finchley
Party	Candidate	Votes	%	±%
Liberal	T. Atholl Robertson	13,159	54.7	+7.9
Unionist	John Pretyman Newman	10,883	45.3	−7.9
Majority		2,276	9.4	N/A
Turnout		24,042	76.0	+3.6
Registered electors		31,650		
Liberal gain from Unionist		Swing	+7.9	

General election 1924: Finchley
Party	Candidate	Votes	%	±%
Unionist	Edward Cadogan	15,277	58.3	+13.0
Liberal	T. Atholl Robertson	10,942	41.7	−13.0
Majority		4,335	16.6	N/A
Turnout		26,219	79.5	+3.5
Registered electors		32,984		
Unionist gain from Liberal		Swing	+13.0	

General election 1929: Finchley
Party	Candidate	Votes	%	±%
Unionist	Edward Cadogan	18,920	48.8	−9.5
Liberal	T. Atholl Robertson	14,065	36.2	−5.5
Labour	J. George Stone	5,824	15.0	New
Majority		4,855	12.6	−4.0
Turnout		38,809	77.2	−2.3
Registered electors		50,243		
Unionist hold		Swing	−2.0	

=== Elections in the 1930s ===
General election 1931: Finchley
Party	Candidate	Votes	%	±%
Conservative	Edward Cadogan	34,286	84.2	+35.4
Labour	J. George Stone	6,440	15.8	+0.8
Majority		27,846	68.4	+55.8
Turnout		40,726	74.3	−2.9
Conservative hold		Swing	+17.3	

Liberal candidate Lady Domini Crosfield withdrew following the formation of the National Government.

General election 1935: Finchley
Party	Candidate	Votes	%	±%
Conservative	John Crowder	26,960	63.6	−20.6
Liberal	T. Atholl Robertson	8,920	21.0	New
Labour	Cyril G Lacey	6,533	15.4	−0.4
Majority		18,040	42.6	−31.8
Turnout		42,413	70.2	−4.1
Conservative hold		Swing		

General Election 1939–40 Another General Election was required to take place before the end of 1940, but it was postponed after the outbreak of World War II. The political parties had been making preparations for an election to take place from 1939, and by the end of that year the following candidates had been selected:

- Conservative: John Crowder
- Liberal: Humphrey Razzall
- Labour: Cyril Lacey

=== Elections in the 1940s ===
General election 1945: Finchley
Party	Candidate	Votes	%	±%
Conservative	John Crowder	24,256	48.5	−15.1
Labour	Cyril G Lacey	18,611	37.2	+21.8
Liberal	David Goldblatt	7,164	14.3	−6.7
Majority		5,645	11.28	−31.3
Turnout		50,031	74.2	+4.0
Conservative hold		Swing	+18.4	

=== Elections in the 1950s ===
General election 1950: Finchley
Party	Candidate	Votes	%	±%
Conservative	John Crowder	32,262	52.9	+4.4
Labour	Dorothy Pickles	19,683	32.3	−5.0
Liberal	Andrew McFadyean	9,094	14.9	+0.6
Majority		12,579	20.6	+9.3
Turnout		60,999	84.9	+10.7
Conservative hold		Swing	+4.2	

General election 1951: Finchley
Party	Candidate	Votes	%	±%
Conservative	John Crowder	33,308	54.9	+2.0
Labour	Jack Ashley	20,520	33.8	+1.6
Liberal	Walter John Done	6,853	11.3	−3.6
Majority		12,788	21.1	+0.5
Turnout		60,411	84.0	−0.9
Conservative hold		Swing	+0.3	

General election 1955: Finchley
Party	Candidate	Votes	%	±%
Conservative	John Crowder	30,233	54.5	−0.4
Labour	Terence Lancaster	17,408	31.4	−2.4
Liberal	Manuela Sykes	7,775	14.0	+2.7
Majority		12,825	23.1	+2.0
Turnout		55,416	78.3	−5.7
Conservative hold		Swing	−1.0	

General election 1959: Finchley
Party	Candidate	Votes	%	±%
Conservative	Margaret Thatcher	29,697	53.2	−1.3
Labour	Eric Deakins	13,437	24.1	−7.3
Liberal	Henry Ivan Spence	12,701	22.7	+8.7
Majority		16,260	29.1	+6.0
Turnout		55,835	80.8	+2.5
Conservative hold		Swing	+3.0	

=== Elections in the 1960s ===
General election 1964: Finchley
Party	Candidate	Votes	%	±%
Conservative	Margaret Thatcher	24,591	46.6	−6.6
Liberal	John Pardoe	15,789	29.9	+7.2
Labour	Albert Edward Tomlinson	12,408	23.5	−0.6
Majority		8,802	16.7	−12.4
Turnout		52,788	78.2	−2.6
Conservative hold		Swing		

General election 1966: Finchley
Party	Candidate	Votes	%	±%
Conservative	Margaret Thatcher	23,968	46.5	−0.1
Labour	Yvonne Sieve	14,504	28.1	+4.6
Liberal	Frank Davis	13,070	25.4	−4.5
Majority		9,464	18.4	+1.7
Turnout		51,542	75.3	−2.9
Conservative hold		Swing	−2.4	

=== Elections in the 1970s ===
General election 1970: Finchley
Party	Candidate	Votes	%	±%
Conservative	Margaret Thatcher	25,480	53.8	+7.3
Labour	Michael Freeman	14,295	30.2	+2.1
Liberal	Graham Mitchell	7,614	16.1	−9.3
Majority		11,185	23.6	+5.2
Turnout		47,389	65.6	−9.7
Conservative hold		Swing	+2.6	

General election February 1974: Finchley
Party	Candidate	Votes	%	±%
Conservative	Margaret Thatcher	18,180	43.7	−8.6
Labour	Martin O'Connor	12,202	29.3	−2.3
Liberal	Laurence Brass	11,221	27.0	+10.9
Majority		5,978	14.4	
Turnout		41,603	78.0	
Conservative hold		Swing	−3.1	

General election October 1974: Finchley
Party	Candidate	Votes	%	±%
Conservative	Margaret Thatcher	16,498	44.0	+0.3
Labour	Martin O'Connor	12,587	33.6	+4.3
Liberal	Laurence Brass	7,384	19.7	−7.3
National Front	Janet Godfrey	993	2.7	New
Majority		3,911	10.4	−4.0
Turnout		37,462	69.5	−8.5
Conservative hold		Swing	−2.0	

General election 1979: Finchley
Party	Candidate	Votes	%	±%
Conservative	Margaret Thatcher	20,918	52.5	+8.5
Labour	Richard May	13,040	32.7	−0.9
Liberal	Anthony Paterson	5,254	13.2	−6.5
National Front	William Verity	534	1.3	−1.4
Independent Democrat	Elizabeth Lloyd	86	0.2	New
Majority		7,878	19.8	+9.4
Turnout		39,832	72.5	+3.0
Conservative hold		Swing	+4.7	

=== Elections in the 1980s ===
General election 1983: Finchley
Party	Candidate	Votes	%	±%
Conservative	Margaret Thatcher	19,616	51.1	−1.4
Labour	Laurence Spigel	10,302	26.8	−5.9
Liberal	Margaret Joachim	7,763	20.2	+7.0
Ecology	Simone Wilkinson	279	0.7	New
Monster Raving Loony	Screaming Lord Sutch	235	0.6	New
Ban Every Licensing Law Society	Anthony Noonan	75	0.2	New
Rail Not Motorway	Helen Anscomb	42	0.1	New
Law and Order in Gotham City	Anthony Whitehead	37	0.1	New
Anti-Censorship	David Webb	28	0.1	New
Party of Associates with Licensees	Brian Wareham	27	0.1	New
Belgrano Blood-Hunger	Benjamin Wedmore	13	0.0	New
Majority		9,314	24.3	+4.5
Turnout		38,417	69.0	−3.5
Conservative hold		Swing	+2.2	

General election 1987: Finchley
Party	Candidate	Votes	%	±%
Conservative	Margaret Thatcher	21,603	53.9	+2.8
Labour	John Davies	12,690	31.7	+4.9
Liberal	David Howarth	5,580	13.9	−7.3
Gremloid Party	Lord Buckethead	131	0.3	New
Gold Party	Michaelle St Vincent	59	0.2	New
Majority		8,913	22.2	−2.1
Turnout		40,063	69.4	+0.4
Conservative hold		Swing	−1.0	

=== Elections in the 1990s ===
General election 1992: Finchley
Party	Candidate	Votes	%	±%
Conservative	Hartley Booth	21,039	51.2	−2.7
Labour	Ann Marjoram	14,651	35.7	+4.0
Liberal Democrats	Hilary Leighter	4,568	11.1	−2.8
Green	Ashley Gunstock	564	1.4	New
Monster Raving Loony	Sally Johnson	130	0.3	New
Natural Law	James Macrae	129	0.3	New
Majority		6,388	15.5	−6.7
Turnout		41,081	77.6	+8.2
Conservative hold		Swing	−3.3	

== Sources ==
- Boundaries of Parliamentary Constituencies 1885–1972, compiled and edited by F.W.S. Craig (Parliamentary Reference Publications 1972)

Parliament of the United Kingdom
New constituency	UK Parliament constituency 1918–1997	Succeeded by Finchley and Golders Green (newly created seat)
New constituency	UK Parliament constituency 1918–1997	Succeeded by Chipping Barnet (in part)
Preceded by Sidcup	Constituency represented by the leader of the opposition 1975–1979	Succeeded by Cardiff South East
Preceded by Cardiff South East	Constituency represented by the prime minister 1979–1990	Succeeded by Huntingdon
