= 1919 Kingston upon Hull Central by-election =

UK parliamentary by-election

- 29 March 1919
- Registered: 31,421
- Turnout: 51.9%
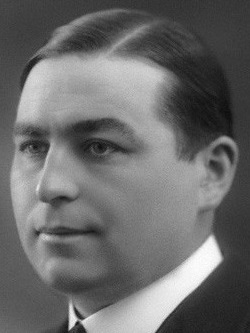

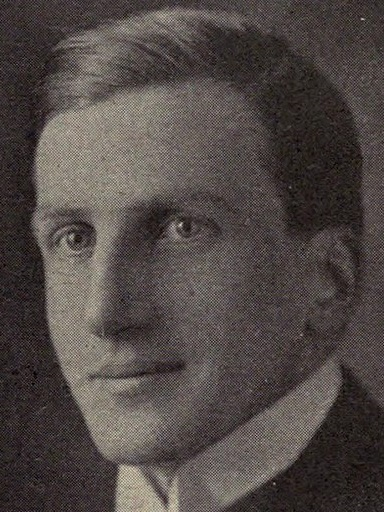
| Candidate | Joseph Kenworthy | Eustace Percy |
| Party | Liberal | Unionist |
| Alliance | | Coalition |
| Popular vote | 8,616 | 7,699 |
| Percentage | 52.8% | 47.2% |
| Swing | ▲32.9% | ▼32.9% |
MP before election
Mark Sykes
Unionist
Subsequent MP
Joseph Kenworthy
Liberal

The 1919 Kingston upon Hull Central by-election was a parliamentary by-election held for the British House of Commons constituency of Kingston upon Hull Central on 29 March 1919. The by-election was the fifth to be held during the 1918-1922 parliament.

== Vacancy ==
The seat had become vacant when the Coalition Conservative Member of Parliament (MP) Sir Mark Sykes died on 16 February 1919 aged 39, a victim of the Spanish flu pandemic. He had held the seat since winning the 1911 Kingston upon Hull Central by-election on 5 July 1911.

== Electoral history ==
The result at the last general election in 1918 was;

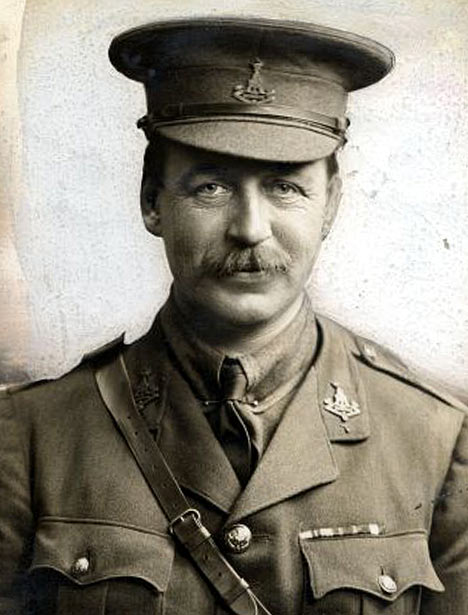
Sykes

1918 general election: Kingston-Upon-Hull Central
| Party | | Candidate | Votes | % |
|---|---|---|---|---|
| C | Unionist | Mark Sykes | 13,805 | 80.1 |
| | Liberal | Roderick Kedward | 3,434 | 19.9 |
| Majority | | | 10,371 | 60.2 |
| Turnout | | | 17,239 | 54.9 |
| Registered electors | | | 31,421 | |
| | Unionist win (new boundaries) | | | |
C indicates candidate endorsed by the coalition government.

== Candidates ==
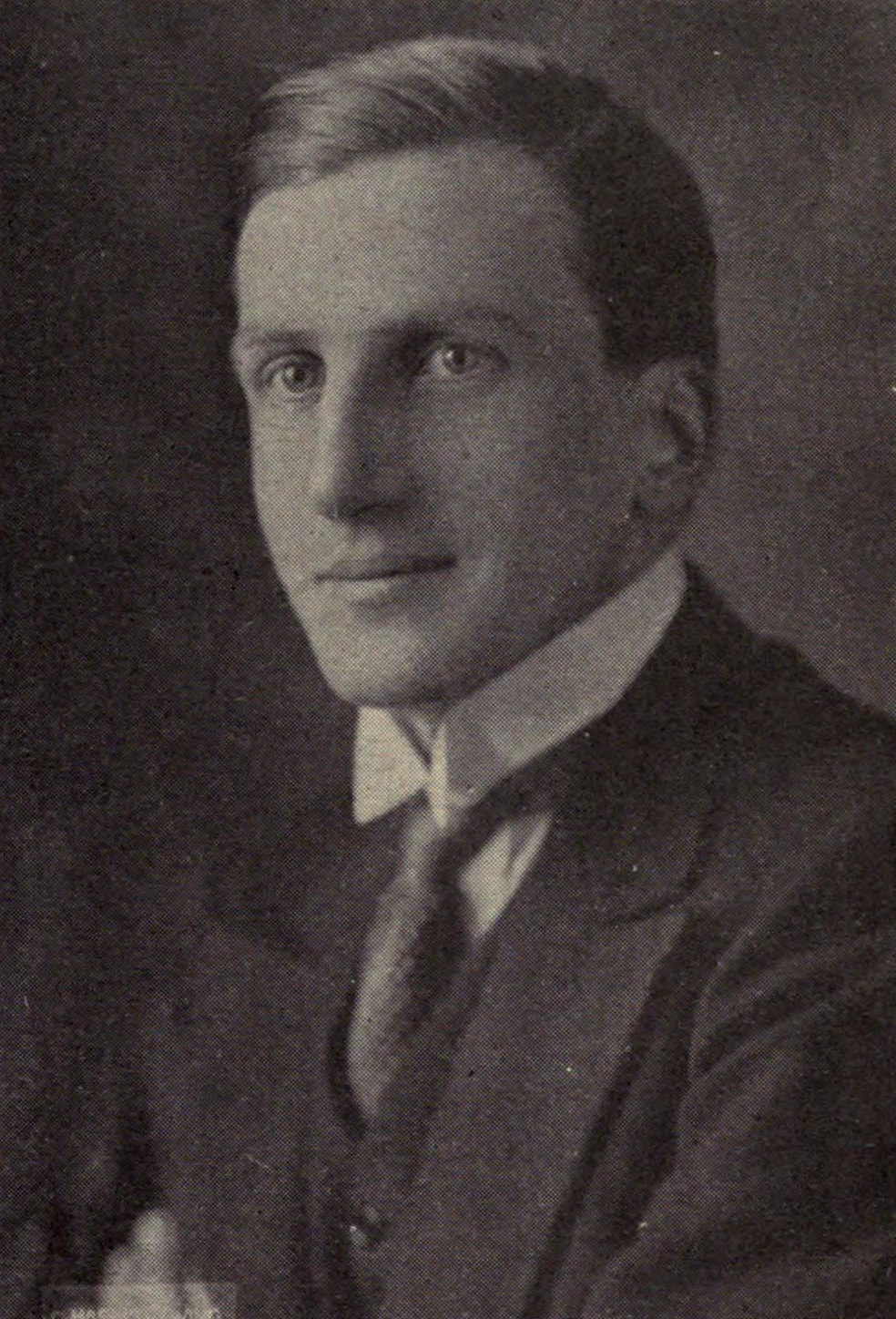
Percy

- The Unionists selected 32-year-old Lord Eustace Percy as their candidate to defend the seat. He was the seventh son of Henry Percy, 7th Duke of Northumberland, and Lady Edith, daughter of George Campbell, 8th Duke of Argyll. He was educated at Eton and Christ Church, Oxford. Percy had served in the Diplomatic Service since 1911. He had not seen war service. He was standing for parliament for the first time.
- The Liberals selected 33-year-old Lt-Comdr. Joseph Kenworthy as their candidate to challenge for the seat. He was born at Leamington in Warwickshire and educated at the Eastman's Royal Naval Academy in Winchester. He joined the Royal Navy in 1902 and left the service in 1920 after serving in the Admiralty war staff in London. Kenworthy first tried to enter Parliament at the 1918 general election fighting Rotherham as a Liberal but came third.

== Campaign ==
Polling Day was set for 29 March 1919, 41 days after the death of the former MP. Nominations closed to confirm that the election would be a two-way contest.

Percy immediately received the official endorsement of the Coalition Government.

As with the Leyton West by-election 6 weeks earlier, the dominant issue of the campaign was the idea being floated by the Coalition Government of retaining Conscription during peacetime. Kenworthy took a strong line in opposition to continuing conscription. He also argued against the imposition of impossible reparations against Germany. Percy's campaign did little other than express support for the Coalition Government.

== Result ==
According to reports in The Times newspaper, the by-election proved largely uneventful and the parties were expecting a small poll. In the event there was a turnout of 51% which although on the lower end of the spectrum for by-elections of the day, was not the lowest experienced during the 1918–1922 Parliament. Popular opinion was swinging against the coalition government of David Lloyd George and Bonar Law and particularly against the Conservative half of the coalition. As a result, the Liberal candidate, Joseph Kenworthy, gained the seat for his party with a majority of 917 over his Coalition Conservative opponent, Lord Eustace Percy.

Kenworthy

1919 Kingston upon Hull Central by-election
| Party | | Candidate | Votes | % | ±% |
|---|---|---|---|---|---|
| | Liberal | Joseph Kenworthy | 8,616 | 52.8 | +32.9 |
| C | Unionist | Eustace Percy | 7,699 | 47.2 | −32.9 |
| Majority | | | 917 | 5.6 | N/A |
| Turnout | | | 16,315 | 51.9 | −3.0 |
| Registered electors | | | 31,421 | | |
| | Liberal gain from Unionist | | Swing | +32.9 | |
C indicates candidate endorsed by the coalition government.

British Pathe has newsreel footage of Joseph Kenworthy taken after his election victory. http://www.britishpathe.com/video/commander-kenworthy/query/election

== Aftermath ==
Kenworthy went on to hold the seat for the Liberals at the subsequent general election. The result at the following general election in 1922 was;

1922 general election: Kingston-Upon-Hull Central
| Party | Candidate | Votes | % | ±% |
|---|---|---|---|---|
| Liberal | Joseph Kenworthy | 15,374 | 55.5 | +2.7 |
| Unionist | Herbert William Looker | 12,347 | 44.5 | −2.7 |
| Majority | | 3,027 | 11.0 | +5.4 |
| Turnout | | 27,721 | 79.1 | +27.2 |
| Registered electors | | 35,037 | | |
| Liberal hold | | Swing | +2.7 | |

Percy was to find electoral success elsewhere and go on to sit in the Conservative Cabinet of Stanley Baldwin. The proposal for retaining Conscription during peacetime was quickly dropped.

== See also ==
- List of United Kingdom by-elections
- United Kingdom by-election records
- 1926 Kingston-upon-Hull Central by-election
- List of United Kingdom by-elections (1918–1931)
