= Robert Aske =

Robert Aske may refer to:

- Robert Aske (political leader) (1500–1537), leader of the Pilgrimage of Grace, against the dissolution of the monasteries
- Robert Aske (merchant) (1619–1689), merchant and member of the Worshipful Company of Haberdashers, founder of the Haberdashers' Aske's Boys' School
- Sir Robert Aske, 1st Baronet (1872–1954), British Liberal politician, MP 1923–1924, 1929–1945
