= Aske =

Aske or ASKE may refer to:

- Aske (EP), an EP by Burzum
- Aske, North Yorkshire, England
  - Aske Hall
- ASKE, Association for Skeptical Enquiry
- Α.Σ.Κ.Ε., Fighting Socialist Party of Greece
- Robert Aske (political leader) (1500–1537)
- Robert Aske (merchant) (1619–1689)
- Aske baronets

== See also ==
- Ask and Embla, the first humans in Norse mythology
