= Telegraph Hill, Lewisham =

Coordinates: 51.466°N 0.044°W

Telegraph Hill
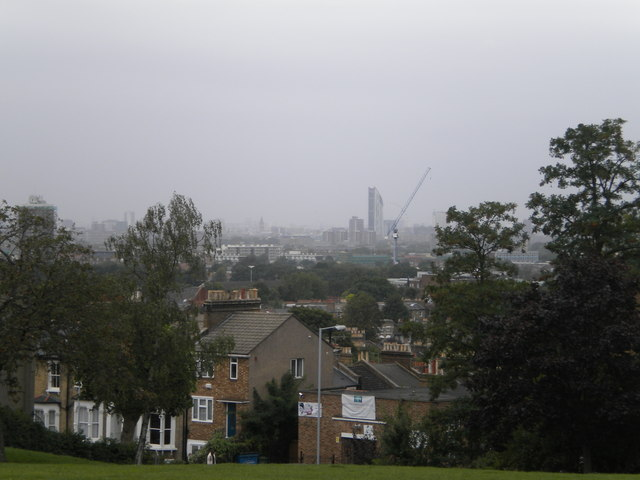
- View of central London from Telegraph Hill Park

- Location within Greater London
- Population: 16,414 (2011 Census. Ward)
- OS grid reference: TQ359760
- London borough: Lewisham
- Ceremonial county: Greater London
- Region: London
- Country: England
- Sovereign state: United Kingdom
- Post town: LONDON
- Postcode district: SE14 and SE4
- Dialling code: 020
- Police: Metropolitan
- Fire: London
- Ambulance: London
- UK Parliament: Lewisham North
- London Assembly: Greenwich and Lewisham

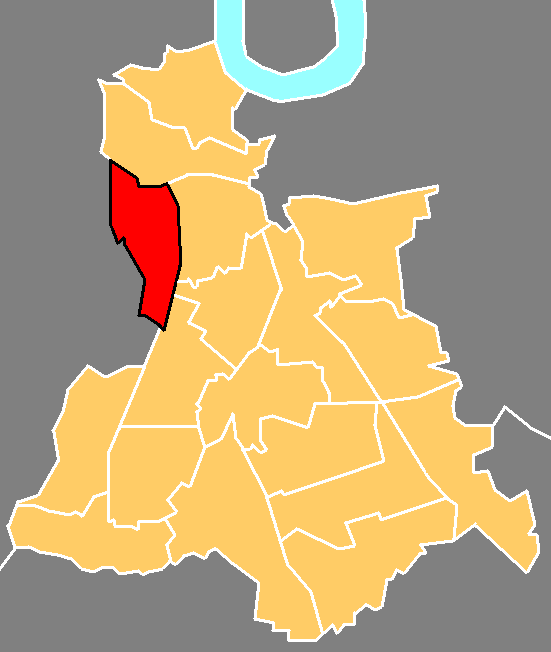
The electoral ward of Telegraph Hill (red) within the London Borough of Lewisham (orange)

Telegraph Hill is a largely residential conservation area bounded by Nunhead and Brockley and is an electoral ward just south of New Cross in the London Borough of Lewisham in southeast London, England.

== History ==
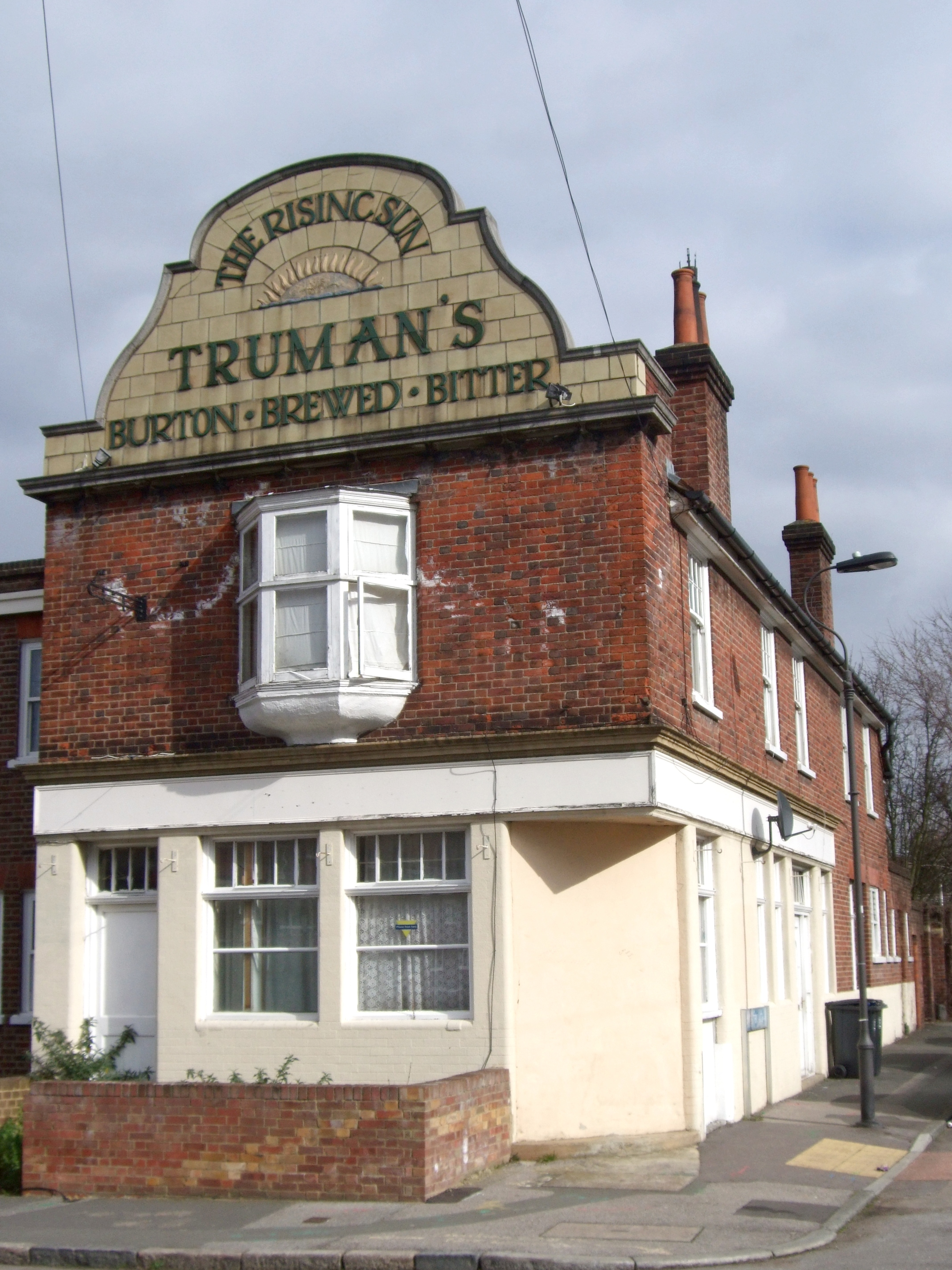
The Rising Sun pub, now converted to a residence

Telegraph Hill rises to around 50 metres (160 ft) at its highest point and was formerly known as Plowed Garlic Hill. It gained its current name from a semaphore telegraph station which was constructed on the summit of the hill circa 1795. The signalling station was one of the points from which news of Wellington's victory at Waterloo was flashed to London. It was removed in 1823.

The poet Robert Browning at one time lived at the foot of Telegraph Hill, in a cottage which he wrote looked like a 'goose pie'.

For many years Telegraph Hill was covered by market gardens owned by the Worshipful Company of Haberdashers, one of the ancient livery companies of London. In the late 19th century the Haberdashers decided to develop Telegraph Hill for housing. The company had already built terraced housing on its land nearer New Cross Road when it commissioned a study of the development potential of Telegraph Hill in 1859. The surveyor recommended 'the erection of dwelling houses of a high standard' on wide tree-lined streets.

Most construction took place around 1871. The villas are distinctive in style and as a result of this architectural unity Telegraph Hill is now a conservation area. The company added Haberdashers' Aske's School for boys and girls (named after one of its members Robert Aske, and now Haberdashers' Hatcham College) in 1875, a separate Haberdashers' Aske's girls' school in 1891 and St Catherine's Church in 1894.

In 1895 the London County Council opened Telegraph Hill Park to the public.

== St Catherine's Church ==
St Catherine's Church was built in 1893 on the summit of Telegraph Hill. Designed by the surveyor to the Haberdashers Company as part of their development of the area around Telegraph Hill, it was destroyed by fire on 6 May 1913, allegedly arson by suffragettes, and rebuilt “with a larger chancel” by Stock, Page & Stock (i.e. the present church, although that was badly damaged in World War 2).

== Telegraph Hill Centre ==
The Telegraph Hill Centre, situated next to St Catherine's Church, was built in 1971 and opened in 1972 by Bishop Trevor Huddleston and actress Glenda Jackson. Funding from London Borough of Lewisham was cut in 1986/7 and ownership and funding of the site reverted to St Catherine's Church. The Centre is now a self-funded entity owned by St Catherine's Church, and continues to provide services with and for the local community.

In 2010 St Catherine's Church, in partnership with Telegraph Hill Centre, set up the Hill Station Cafe.

== Telegraph Hill Festival ==
In 1993, the vicar of St Catherine's Church and local residents set up the Telegraph Hill Festival. The festival ran for 25 years and included musical events, plays, public art and open studios across the area. The last festival was in 2019.

== Telegraph Hill Park ==
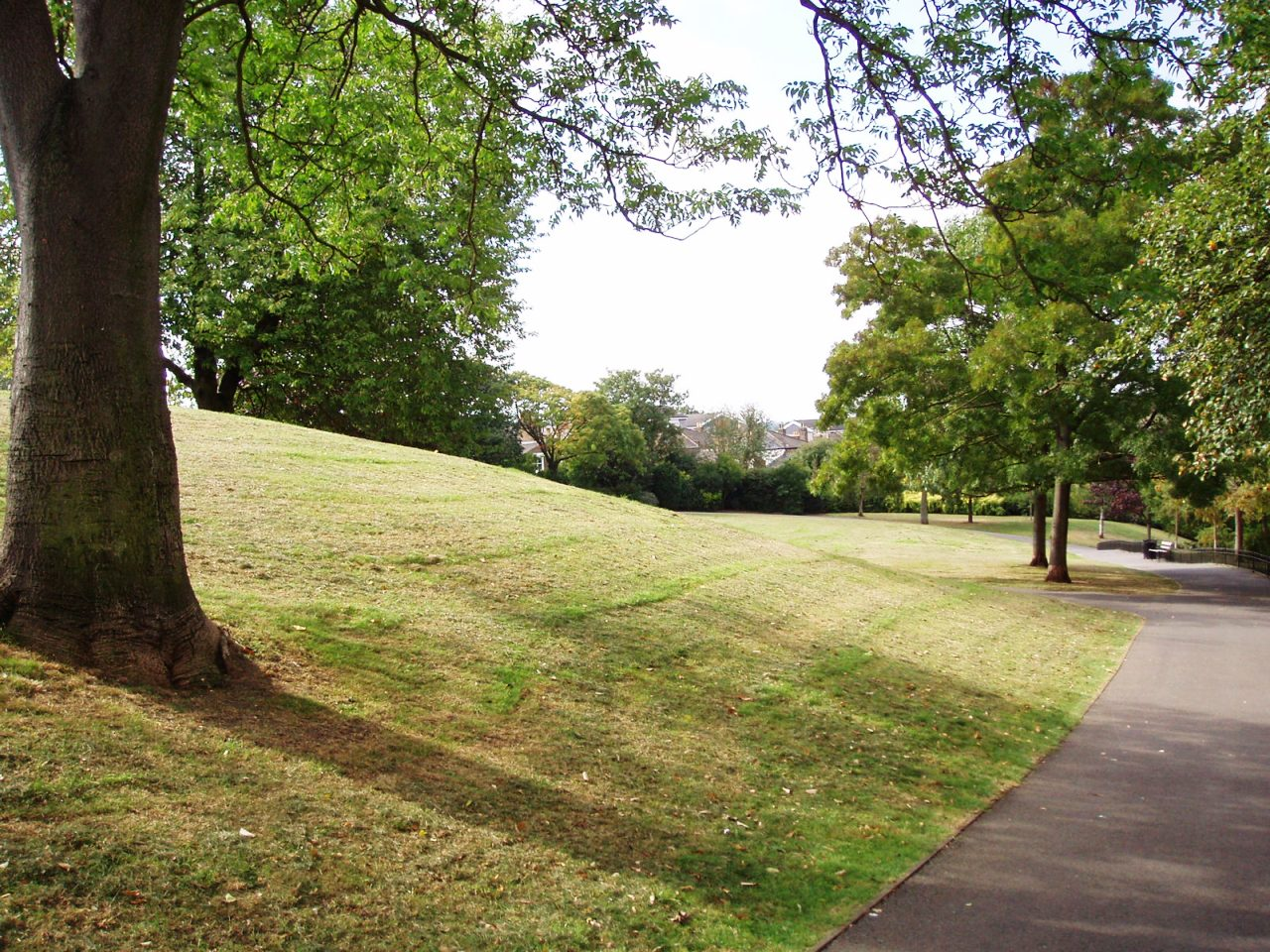
Telegraph Hill Park

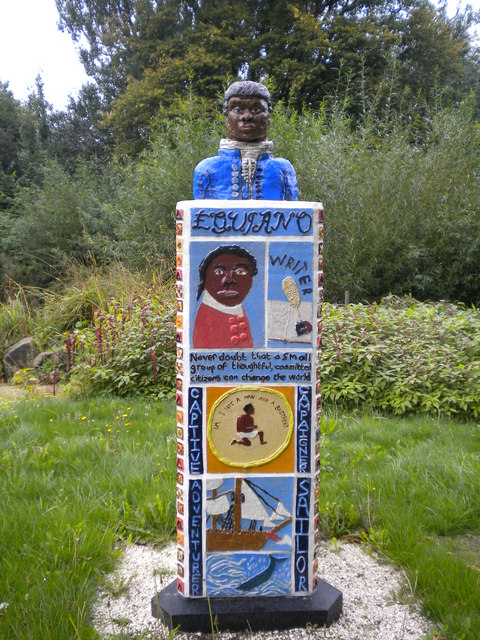
Memorial to Olaudah Equiano

Telegraph Hill Park is in two halves on either side of Kitto Road; the upper park contains tennis courts which apparently occupy the site of the telegraph station which gave the hill its name. This upper part is the only part of the park to allow dogs, and is a popular spot amongst the local community for watching the New Years fireworks across London due to its excellent vantage point and view across the London skyline. The lower park contains ponds, children's playgrounds and a concrete space for ball games as well as a statue of Olaudah Equiano. A farmers' market is held in the lower park on every Saturday.

== Telegraph Hill Society ==
The Telegraph Hill Society was a local residents' group which campaigned for improvements to the area.

== Schools and colleges ==
Telegraph Hill is home to the Haberdashers' Hatcham College. A Coade stone statue of Robert Aske stands in the forecourt of Haberdasher's Boys' School in Pepys Road. It dates from 1836 and shows him in the robes of the Haberdashers' Company, leaning on a plinth and holding the plans of the buildings in his hand.

Robert Aske (24 February 1619 – 27 January 1689) was a merchant and haberdasher in the City of London chiefly remembered for the charitable foundation created from his estate, which nowadays operates the Haberdashers' Schools. Aske was the son of an affluent draper, and became a Freeman of the Worshipful Company of Haberdashers in 1643, being elected an Alderman of the City of London in 1666.

The hill's other secondary school, Telegraph Hill School, closed in 2003. A campaign by local parents failed to persuade the council to establish a new secondary school on the site. Instead, a sixth form centre called Crossways Sixth Form was built on the site, and opened in 2004. The site was taken over by Christ the King Sixth Form College in 2013. Telegraph Hill also has a primary school: the Edmund Waller Primary School, in Waller Road.

== Politics ==
Telegraph Hill ward is one of 18 council wards that make up the Lewisham borough council.

== Demography ==
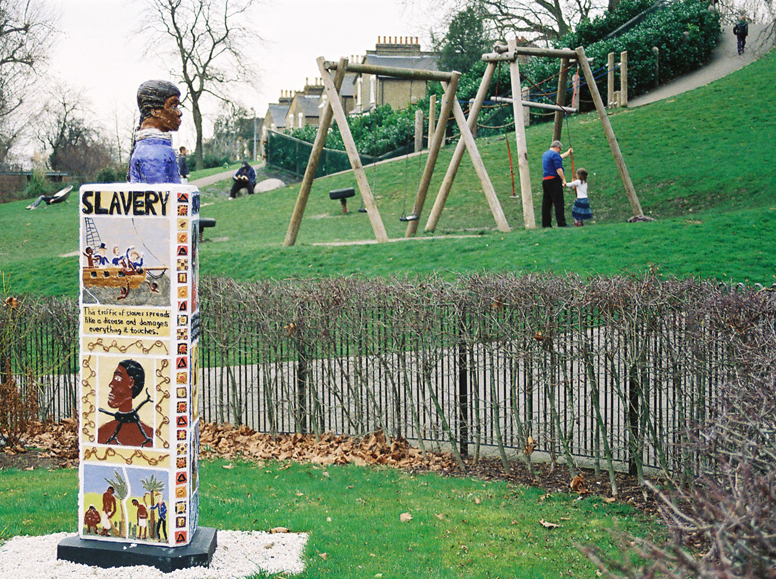
The lower park on Telegraph Hill features a monument to anti-slavery campaigner Olaudah Equiano, created in 2008 by children from the Edmund Waller School.

In comparison with overall numbers for London and England, the majority of Telegraph Hill ward's population is young; typically aged 34 and under, with a smaller than average population among the 35 plus and older age groups.

Approximately 51% of the ward's population identified as white, while 8% identified as Asian/Asian British, and 30% as Black/African/Caribbean/Black British. Lewisham is the 15th most ethnically diverse local authority in England, and two out of every five residents are from a black, Asian or ethnically diverse background.
