= Haberdashers' Hatcham College =

Coordinates: 51.4679°N 0.0433°W

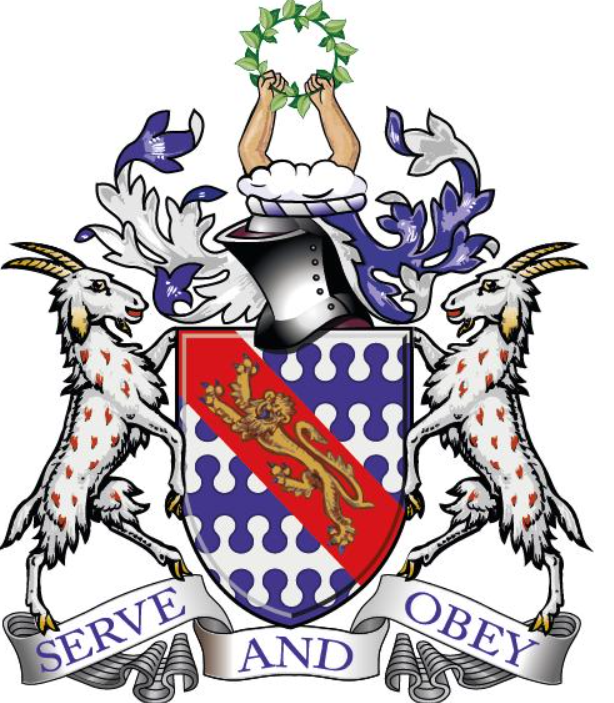
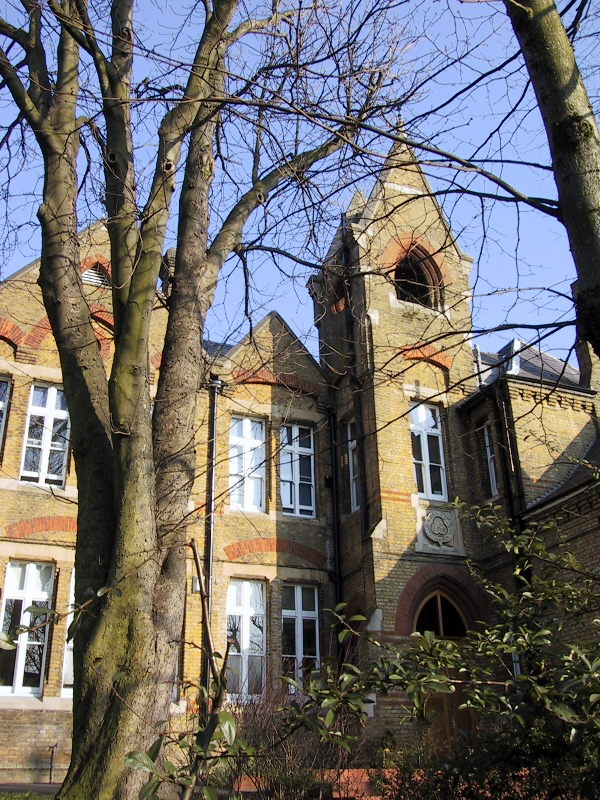
- Coat of arms of the Haberdashers' Company The Pepys Road site
- London,, SE14 5SF, England

Information
- Type: Academy
- Motto: Serve and Obey
- Established: 1875
- Founder: Robert Aske
- Local authority: Lewisham
- Specialist: Music
- Department for Education URN: 135073 Tables
- Ofsted: Reports
- Chairman of Governors: Robert Bowsher
- Headmistress: Katie Scott
- Staff: ~100
- Gender: Mixed (formerly Boys)
- Age: 11 to 18
- Enrolment: ~1200
Colour
- Website: www.habshatcham.org.uk

Haberdashers' Hatcham College (formerly Haberdashers' Aske's Hatcham College) is a state secondary school with academy status and a music specialism in New Cross, south-east London. The school was formerly a grammar school, then a comprehensive City Technology College and now an Academy operating between two sites near New Cross Gate.

In 2005 the Worshipful Company of Haberdashers established the Haberdashers' Aske's Academies Federation, which includes HAHC.

== History ==
After a bequest made by the merchant Robert Aske to the Worshipful Company of Haberdashers on his death in 1689, a school and almshouses were built at Hoxton near the city of London. When, in 1874, the almshouses were closed, the educational capacity was enlarged and split into two parts, one north of the river and one south. The northern section established a boys' and girls' school in Hoxton, which eventually became Haberdashers' Aske's Boys' School and Haberdashers' Aske's School for Girls, both now sited in Elstree, Hertfordshire. For the southern section, land was purchased at Hatcham, now better known as New Cross Gate, for the foundation of boys' and girls' schools on what is now known as Telegraph Hill. The north London school became generally known as "Haberdashers'", while the south London schools became generally known as "Aske's", though their official titles were parallel. Former pupils of the Hatcham schools are called "Old Askeans".

Two schools were complete on the site now on Pepys Road by late 1875, and in 1889 the site now on Jerningham Road was purchased and the girls' school relocated to the new site.

Under the Education Act 1944 the two schools became grammar schools, and in 1979 became comprehensive schools.

A failing local primary school, Monson Road, was closed. The college and secondary school were joined together, giving all pupils preferential and automatic rights to attend secondary education. Initial optimism for this new school was short lived following a fire at the new Temple Grove school in 2010. There were no injuries, but the school was forced to move to the Hatcham College main site, with temporary buildings at the College being erected. The temporary buildings were estimated to last for up to three years.

In January 2012, the then UK education secretary, Michael Gove, visited the school and gave a speech defending the government policy of converting local authority funded state schools into central government funded academies. In October 2012, a criminal investigation was launched into fraud allegations at the Haberdashers’ Aske’s Federation academy trust chain.

In July 2014, conservative MP, Edward Timpson, reported to Parliament that £2.16 million had been defrauded from The Haberdashers' Aske's Federation Trust between the years 2010 to 2012. On 22 July 2014, BBC London News televised a report on the civil case made by Haberdashers' Aske's Federation Trusts against their former accounts manager Samuel Kayode, a Nigerian accountant and part-time pastor, attempting to recover £4.1m Kayode paid into his personal account over a 7-year period. In June 2016, a criminal case against the perpetrator of the fraud commenced at Woolwich Crown Court. On 24 June 2016, The Woolwich Crown Court sentenced Samuel Kayode to jail for 9 years. Of the £4.1m stolen by Kayode only £800,000 was recovered. Prosecutor James Thacker stated "It is believed to be Britain’s biggest education fraud".

In September 2021 the school dropped the 'Aske's' from its title following controversy over the legacy of Robert Aske, who held £500 of original stock in the slave-trading Royal African Company.

In June 2024 the hosted the inaugural Dodgeball Cricket schools competition mainly competed in from schools within the trust and other schools from Southeast London. Bonus Pastor won the competition beating a team from Haberdashers Hatcham College in the final.

In September 2026 the school announced the school, would be changing the names of it houses, with students being able to nominate people for the houses to be named after.

== Current organisation ==
In 1995 the two schools were combined under a single headteacher (Dr Elizabeth Sidwell - formerly girls' school headteacher and former chief executive officer of the federation), and the name Haberdashers' Aske's Hatcham College. Sidwell left in 2011 and was replaced by Adrian Percival. Teaching is now fully co-educational. Boys and girls were generally taught on their traditional separate sites until 2002, when the boys' and girls' sites were re-organised as lower-school and upper-school sites. Years 7, 8 and 9 are based at the Jerningham Road site; years 10, 11 and the 6th Form are based at the Pepys Road site. The school sports field is located close by on St. Asaph Road in Nunhead.

== Notable alumni ==
- Katy B singer-songwriter
- Danny Bowes, lead singer in rock band Thunder
- Fiona Bruce, journalist, newsreader and television presenter
- Llewella Gideon, actress and writer
- Sidney Green and Richard Hills "Sid Green and Dick Hills" Co-writers for Morecambe and Wise
- Steve Harley, lead Singer, Steve Harley & Cockney Rebel
- Chris Lambert, Olympic sprinter
- David Leslie Linton, geographer
- Dane Baptiste, writer, comedian, podcaster and actor
- Scott Parker, England Football Captain
- Karl Parsons, stained glass artist
- Peter Perrett, lead singer & songwriter, The Only Ones
- Harry Price, psychic researcher
- Rafe Spall, actor
- Karla-Simone Spence, actress
- Jeremy Strong, children's writer
- Barnes Wallis, engineer
- Bill Wedderburn, Baron Wedderburn of Charlton, lawyer, academic and Peer.
- Bradley Wright-Phillips, football player
- Shaun Wright-Phillips, football player

== Partner schools ==
- (United Kingdom) The school was twinned with The Thomas Hardye School in Dorset early 2012
