= David Kenworthy, 11th Baron Strabolgi =

British peer (1914-2010)

The Right Honourable The Lord Strabolgi

Deputy Chief Whip of the House of Lords Captain of the Yeomen of the Guard
- In office 11 March 1974 – 3 May 1979
- Monarch: Elizabeth II
- Prime Minister: Harold Wilson; James Callaghan
- Preceded by: The Lord Denham
- Succeeded by: The Lord Sandys

Member of the House of Lords
- Lord Temporal
- Hereditary peerage 27 January 1954 – 11 November 1999
- Preceded by: The 10th Baron Strabolgi
- Succeeded by: Seat abolished
- Elected Hereditary Peer; 11 November 1999 – 24 December 2010
- Election: 1999
- Preceded by: Seat established
- Succeeded by: The 3rd Viscount Hanworth

Personal details
- Born: 1 November 1914
- Died: 24 December 2010 (aged 96)
- Party: Labour
- Parent: Joseph Kenworthy (father)
- Relatives: Cuthbert Kenworthy (grandfather)
- Education: Gresham's School
- Alma mater: Chelsea School of Art

David Montague de Burgh Kenworthy, 11th Baron Strabolgi (pronounced "Strabogie") (1 November 1914 – 24 December 2010), was a Labour Party peer.

== Education ==
Strabolgi was educated at Gresham's School, Holt, and the Chelsea School of Art.

== Appointments ==
- Captain of the Yeomen of the Guard: 11 March 1974 to 3 May 1979
- Deputy Chief Whip of the Labour Party in the House of Lords: 1974 to 1979

== Title ==
The title of Baron Strabolgi was created in 1318 for the tenth Earl of Atholl. The barony twice went into long periods of abeyance, during which no claim to hold it could be established, the second of these lasting for over three hundred years.

The second period of abeyance was terminated in 1916 in favour of Cuthbert Kenworthy, the grandfather of the 11th Baron Strabolgi, who succeeded Joseph Kenworthy, 10th Baron Strabolgi, in 1953.

== Death ==
Strabolgi died on 24 December 2010, at the age of 96. He was succeeded in the barony by his nephew, Andrew Kenworthy (born 1967), who became the 12th Baron Strabolgi.

== Sources ==
- The Complete Peerage, (1998)
- Burke's Peerage and Baronetage, 106th Edition (1999)
- Lord Strabolgi at thepeerage.com
- Labour members of the House of Lords

Honorary titles
Preceded by The Lord Denham	Captain of the Yeomen of the Guard; 1974–1979	Succeeded by The Lord Sandys
Peerage of England
Preceded by Joseph Kenworthy	Baron Strabolgi; 1953–2010; Member of the House of Lords (1954–1999)	Succeeded by Andrew Kenworthy
Parliament of the United Kingdom
New office created by the House of Lords Act 1999	Elected hereditary peer to the House of Lords under the House of Lords Act 1999; 1999–2010	Succeeded by The Viscount Hanworth
