= Basil Barton =

Major Basil Kelsey Barton MC (1879 – 2 July 1958) was a British solicitor and Conservative Party politician from Hull. He held a seat in the House of Commons from 1931 to 1935.

Barton was educated at Oundle, and was admitted as a solicitor in November 1903, practising in Hull. He served during World War I as a Second Lieutenant with the Royal Field Artillery, winning a Military Cross in 1917, and attaining the rank of Captain. On the Roll of Honour in St Helens Church in Welton, he is listed as having been a prisoner of war.

After the war he resumed practise as a solicitor in Hull.

Barton was elected at the 1931 general election as the Member of Parliament (MP) for Hull Central. The seat had been held since 1919 by Lieutenant-Commander Hon. Joseph Kenworthy, who had first been elected as a Liberal Party and had been comfortably returned in 1926 when he sought re-election after joining the Labour Party. Kenworthy's share of the votes had never fallen below 52%, and in three-way contests in 1926 and 1929 this had given him generous majorities over his Liberal and Conservative opponents. However, the Liberals did not contest any of Hull's four seats in 1931, and The Times newspaper reported during the campaign that despite vigorous campaigning by Kenworthy, who was personally very popular, Barton was winning "the support of many Liberals". When the votes were counted, Barton won with a majority of 3,660 votes (10.2%) over Kenworthy.

Kenworthy succeeded to the peerage in 1934 as Baron Strabolgi, and at the 1935 general election Barton defended his seat against the Labour candidate Walter Windsor. Windsor was a former Communist who had been MP for Bethnal Green North East in the 1920s, and he defeated Barton with an 8% swing.

Barton did not stand for Parliament again. He died aged 79 on 2 July 1958, at his home in Brough-on-Humber, near Hull.

Parliament of the United Kingdom
Preceded by Joseph Kenworthy	Member of Parliament for Hull Central; 1931 – 1935	Succeeded by Walter Windsor
