= Martin Connolly (British politician) =

Martin Henry Connolly (1874 – 8 August 1945) was a British politician and trade unionist.

Born in Newcastle-upon-Tyne, Connolly became an active trade unionist, and was elected to the General Council of the United Society of Boilermakers. He was also active in local politics, and served as a Labour Party member of Newcastle City Council.

Connolly stood for Labour in Middlesbrough East at the 1922 general election, and again in 1923, but failed to win the seat. However, at the 1924 general election, he switched to contest Newcastle-upon-Tyne East, winning the constituency. He lost the seat at the 1929 general election, and did not stand again.

Parliament of the United Kingdom
Preceded by Robert Aske	Member of Parliament for Newcastle-upon-Tyne East; 1924 – 1929	Succeeded by Robert Aske
