= Kingston upon Hull Central =

UK Parliament constituency (1974–1983)

- Former borough constituency for the House of Commons

1885–1955
- Seats: one
- Created from: Kingston upon Hull

1974–1983
- Seats: one
- Replaced by: Hull North and Hull West

Kingston upon Hull Central was a parliamentary constituency in the city of Kingston upon Hull in East Yorkshire. It returned one Member of Parliament to the House of Commons of the Parliament of the United Kingdom.

The constituency was created for the 1885 general election, and abolished for the 1955 general election. It was then re-created for the February 1974 general election, and abolished again for the 1983 general election. Under the proposed 2018 Boundary Commission review, this seat was set to be reinstated for the 2020 general election, replacing the seat of Hull North.

== Boundaries ==
1885–1918: The Municipal Borough of Kingston-upon-Hull wards of Paragon and Queen's, and part of Central ward.

1918–1950: The County Borough of Kingston-upon-Hull wards of Beverley, East Central, Myton, Paragon, West Central, and Whitefriars.

1950–1955: The County Borough of Kingston-upon-Hull wards of Albert, Botanic, Coltman, East Central, Myton, North Newington, Paragon, South Newington, and West Central.

1974–1983: The County Borough of Kingston-upon-Hull wards of Avenue, Beverley, Botanic, Greenwood, Myton, Newland, and University.

== Members of Parliament ==
=== MPs 1885–1955 ===
Year	Member	Party
1885	Seymour King	Conservative
1911	Mark Sykes	Unionist
1919	Joseph Kenworthy	Liberal
1926	Joseph Kenworthy	Labour
1931	Basil Barton	Conservative
1935	Walter Windsor	Labour
1945	Mark Hewitson	Labour
1955	constituency abolished	

=== MPs 1974–1983 ===
Event	Member	Party
Feb 1974	Kevin McNamara	Labour
1983	constituency abolished	

== Elections ==
=== Elections in the 1880s ===
General election 1885: Hull Central
Party	Candidate	Votes	%	±%
Conservative	Seymour King	4,193	46.8	
Liberal	Charles Morgan Norwood	4,027	45.0	
Independent Lib-Lab	Neiles Boynton Billany	735	8.2	
Majority		166	1.8	
Turnout		8,955	77.0	
Registered electors		11,627		
Conservative win (new seat)				

General election 1886: Hull Central
Party	Candidate	Votes	%	±%
Conservative	Seymour King	4,968	56.3	+9.5
Liberal	R. C. Lehmann	3,861	43.7	−1.3
Majority		1,107	12.6	+10.8
Turnout		8,829	75.9	−1.1
Registered electors		11,627		
Conservative hold		Swing	+5.4	

=== Elections in the 1890s ===
General election 1892: Hull Central
Party	Candidate	Votes	%	±%
Conservative	Seymour King	4,938	52.5	−3.8
Lib-Lab	Fred Maddison	4,462	47.5	+3.8
Majority		476	5.0	−7.6
Turnout		9,400	76.1	+0.2
Registered electors		12,350		
Conservative hold		Swing	−3.8	

General election 1895: Hull Central
Party	Candidate	Votes	%	±%
Conservative	Seymour King	5,476	60.9	+8.4
Lib-Lab	Fred Maddison	3,515	39.1	−8.4
Majority		1,961	21.8	+16.8
Turnout		8,991	79.9	+3.8
Registered electors		11,259		
Conservative hold		Swing	+8.4	

=== Elections in the 1900s ===
General election 1900: Hull Central
Party	Candidate	Votes	%	±%
Conservative	Seymour King	5,257	68.1	+7.2
Liberal	George Greenwood	2,465	31.9	−7.2
Majority		2,792	36.2	+14.4
Turnout		7,722	74.4	−5.5
Registered electors		10,378		
Conservative hold		Swing	+7.2	

General election 1906: Hull Central
Party	Candidate	Votes	%	±%
Conservative	Seymour King	4,345	57.8	−10.3
Liberal	George Jackson Bentham	3,167	42.2	+10.3
Majority		1,178	15.6	−20.6
Turnout		7,512	84.8	+10.4
Registered electors		8,861		
Conservative hold		Swing	−10.3	

=== Elections in the 1910s ===
Seymour King

General election January 1910: Hull Central
Party	Candidate	Votes	%	±%
Conservative	Seymour King	3,606	50.1	−7.7
Liberal	Robert Aske	3,586	49.9	+7.7
Majority		20	0.2	−15.4
Turnout		7,192	87.9	+3.1
Registered electors		8,181		
Conservative hold		Swing	−7.7	

Robert Aske

General election December 1910: Hull Central
Party	Candidate	Votes	%	±%
Conservative	Seymour King	3,625	51.5	+1.4
Liberal	Robert Aske	3,418	48.5	−1.4
Majority		207	3.0	+2.8
Turnout		7,043	86.1	−1.8
Registered electors		8,181		
Conservative hold		Swing	+2.4	

1911 Kingston upon Hull Central by-election
Party	Candidate	Votes	%	±%
Conservative	Mark Sykes	3,823	51.9	+0.4
Liberal	Robert Aske	3,545	48.1	−0.4
Majority		278	3.8	+0.8
Turnout		7,368	84.6	−1.5
Registered electors		8,712		
Conservative hold		Swing	+0.4	

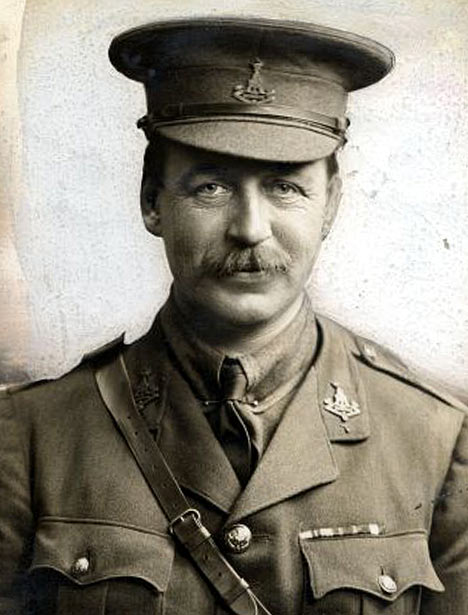
Sykes

General election 1918: Hull Central
Party		Candidate	Votes	%	±%
C	Unionist	Mark Sykes	13,805	80.1	+28.6
	Liberal	Roderick Kedward	3,434	19.9	−28.6
Majority			10,371	60.2	+57.2
Turnout			17,239	54.9	−31.2
	Unionist hold		Swing		
C indicates candidate endorsed by the coalition government.

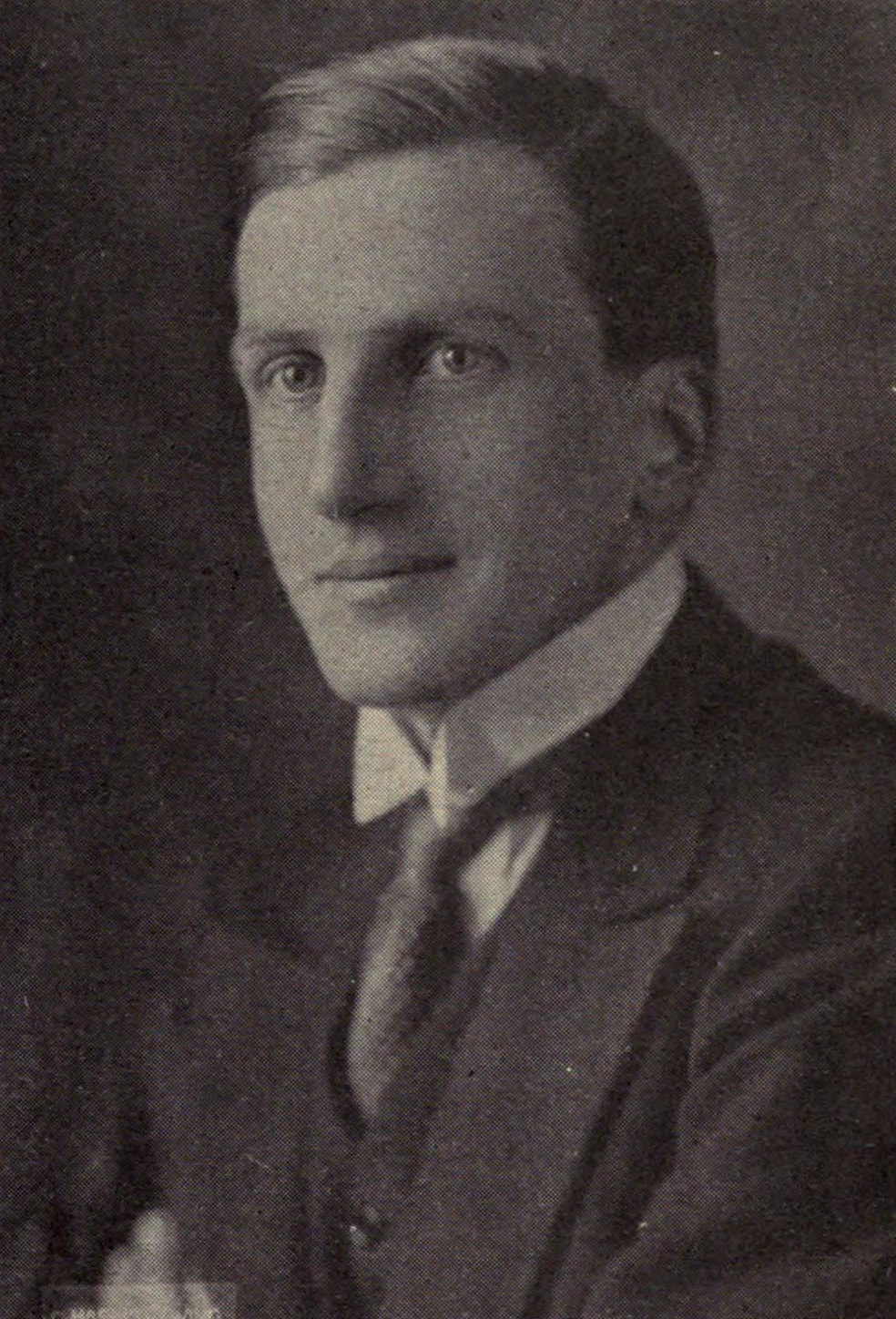
Percy

1919 Kingston upon Hull Central by-election
Party		Candidate	Votes	%	±%
	Liberal	Joseph Kenworthy	8,616	52.8	+32.9
C	Unionist	Eustace Percy	7,699	47.2	−32.9
Majority			917	5.6	N/A
Turnout			16,315	51.9	−3.0
	Liberal gain from Unionist		Swing	+32.9	
C indicates candidate endorsed by the coalition government.

=== Elections in the 1920s ===
Kenworthy

General election 1922: Hull Central
Party	Candidate	Votes	%	±%
Liberal	Joseph Kenworthy	15,374	55.5	+35.6
Unionist	Herbert Looker	12,347	44.5	−35.6
Majority		3,027	11.0	N/A
Turnout		27,721	79.1	+24.2
Registered electors		35,037		
Liberal gain from Unionist		Swing	+35.6	

General election 6 December 1923: Hull Central
Party	Candidate	Votes	%	±%
Liberal	Joseph Kenworthy	15,847	60.1	+4.6
Unionist	Edward Wooll	10,507	39.9	−4.6
Majority		5,340	20.2	+9.2
Turnout		26,354	73.0	−6.1
Registered electors		36,085		
Liberal hold		Swing	+4.6	

General election 1924: Hull Central
Party	Candidate	Votes	%	±%
Liberal	Joseph Kenworthy	15,234	54.1	−6.0
Unionist	Lancelot Evelyn Gaunt	12,904	45.9	+6.0
Majority		2,330	8.2	−12.0
Turnout		28,138	77.1	+4.1
Registered electors		36,514		
Liberal hold		Swing	−6.0	

1926 Kingston-upon-Hull Central by-election
Party	Candidate	Votes	%	±%
Labour	Joseph Kenworthy	16,145	52.9	New
Unionist	Lancelot Evelyn Gaunt	11,466	37.6	−8.3
Liberal	Charles Kerr	2,885	9.5	−44.6
Majority		4,679	15.3	N/A
Turnout		30,496	82.8	+5.7
Registered electors		36,820		
Labour gain from Liberal		Swing		

General election 1929: Hull Central
Party	Candidate	Votes	%	±%
Labour	Joseph Kenworthy	18,815	54.1	N/A
Unionist	Lawrence Kimball	11,181	32.1	−13.8
Liberal	Alfred Samuel Doran	4,802	13.8	−40.3
Majority		7,634	22.0	N/A
Turnout		34,798	78.3	+1.2
Registered electors		44,439		
Labour gain from Liberal		Swing		

=== Elections in the 1930s ===
General election 1931: Kingston upon Hull Central
Party	Candidate	Votes	%	±%
Conservative	Basil Barton	19,773	55.10	
Labour	Joseph Kenworthy	16,113	44.90	
Majority		3,660	10.20	N/A
Turnout		35,886	83.16	
Conservative gain from Labour		Swing		

General election 1935: Kingston upon Hull Central
Party	Candidate	Votes	%	±%
Labour	Walter Windsor	14,851	52.88	
Conservative	Basil Barton	13,232	47.12	
Majority		1,619	5.76	N/A
Turnout		28,082	75.63	
Labour gain from Conservative		Swing		

=== Elections in the 1940s ===
General Election 1939–40:

Another general election was required to take place before the end of 1940. The political parties had been making preparations for an election to take place from 1939 and by the end of this year, the following candidates had been selected;

- Labour: Walter Windsor
- Conservative: Diana Spearman

General election 1945: Kingston upon Hull Central
Party	Candidate	Votes	%	±%
Labour	Mark Hewitson	8,786	58.75	
Conservative	Diana Spearman	4,106	27.46	
Liberal	C. Stanley Bell	2,062	13.79	New
Majority		4,680	31.29	
Turnout		14,954	73.01	
Labour hold		Swing		

=== Elections in the 1950s ===
General election 1950: Kingston upon Hull Central
Party	Candidate	Votes	%	±%
Labour	Mark Hewitson	27,351	56.49	
Conservative	Richard Wilberforce	15,951	32.95	
Liberal	Albert Richard Hardcastle	5,113	10.56	
Majority		11,400	23.54	
Turnout		48,415	78.19	
Labour hold		Swing		

General election 1951: Kingston upon Hull Central
Party	Candidate	Votes	%	±%
Labour	Mark Hewitson	29,674	61.71	
Conservative	William R. Bull	18,413	38.29	
Majority		11,261	23.42	
Turnout		48,087	76.33	
Labour hold		Swing		

=== Elections in the 1970s ===
General election February 1974: Kingston upon Hull Central
Party	Candidate	Votes	%	±%
Labour	Kevin McNamara	26,855	58.27	
Conservative	P. W. J. Carver	19,236	41.73	
Majority		7,619	16.54	
Turnout		46,091	73.51	
Labour hold		Swing		

General election October 1974: Kingston upon Hull Central
Party	Candidate	Votes	%	±%
Labour	Kevin McNamara	22,417	52.35	
Conservative	P. W. J. Carver	12,596	29.41	
Liberal	Norman Wallace Turner	7,810	18.24	New
Majority		9,821	22.94	
Turnout		42,823	67.67	
Labour hold		Swing		

General election 1979: Kingston upon Hull Central
Party	Candidate	Votes	%	±%
Labour	Kevin McNamara	22,318	52.14	
Conservative	J. Tillett	14,725	34.40	
Liberal	J. Bryant	5,069	11.84	
National Front	A. Braithwaite	422	0.99	New
Socialist Unity	P. M. Stanton	274	0.64	New
Majority		7,593	17.74	
Turnout		42,808	70.41	
Labour hold		Swing		
