= Mary Hocking =

British novelist

- Born: 8 April 1921
- Died: 17 February 2014 (aged 92)
- Occupation: Writer

Mary Hocking (8 April 1921 - 17 February 2014) was a British writer who published 24 novels between 1961 and 1996.

Hocking was educated at Haberdashers' Aske's School for Girls, Acton, London. In World War Two she served in the Women's Royal Naval Service. After the War she became a local government officer in the Middlesex Education Department, where she worked until the success of her first novel allowed her to become a full-time writer and move to Lewes, East Sussex, where she lived for the rest of her life.

Hocking's novels were published by Chatto & Windus. They are characterized by wit and irony, and their subject matter often includes central women characters and their relationships with families, or individuals seen against a background of work and society, with moral questions asked. Most of Hocking's novels are set in the contemporary world, although He Who Plays the King (1980) is a historical novel set in the last years of the Wars of the Roses. Her last novel, The Meeting Place (1996), included time-slip scenes. The Fairley family trilogy - Good Daughters (1984), Indifferent Heroes (1985) and Welcome, Stranger (1988) - is family saga spanning several decades of the twentieth century, including the Second World War; Letters from Constance (1991) is an epistolary novel that looks back over the same period.

Nick Totton commented about The Mind has Mountains in The Spectator: "Mary Hocking writes brilliantly on many levels at once, because she knows that the everyday contains another, stranger reality: it only takes attention, an at first casual intensification of vision, to open the crack between the worlds ... The Mind Has Mountains is a funny, serious book, to be read and reread: the kind of book that bides its time, perhaps remaining an innocuous entertainment for years until a reader is opened to it by explosive experience—'so that was what it meant!' It is a Steppenwolf for our time; and, I think, the equal of Hesse's."

Mary Hocking died in 2014.

== Novels ==
- The Winter City (1961)
- Visitors to the Crescent (1962)
- The Sparrow (1964)
- The Young Spaniard (1965)
- Ask No Question (1967)
- A Time of War (1968)
- Checkmate (1969)
- The Hopeful Traveller (1970)
- The Climbing Frame (1971)
- Family Circle (1972)
- Daniel Come to Judgement (1974)
- The Bright Day (1975)
- The Mind has Mountains (1976)
- Look, Stranger! (1978)
- He Who Plays the King (1980)
- March House (1981)
- Good Daughters (1984)
- Indifferent Heroes (1985)
- Welcome Strangers (1986)
- An Irrelevant Woman (1987)
- A Particular Place (1989)
- Letters from Constance (1991)
- The Very Dead of Winter (1993)
- The Meeting Place (1996)
