= Veronica Castang =

British actress (1938–1988)

Veronica Castang (22 April 1938 – 5 November 1988) was a British film, stage and television actress.

== Biography ==
A native of London, she was educated at Haberdashers' Aske's School for Girls, before studying at the Sorbonne and at the Questors Theatre in London. In the United States, she appeared onstage on Broadway and Off Broadway. She often appeared in plays produced at the Phoenix Theatre and the Manhattan Theatre Club.

She died, aged 50, at her home in Manhattan from complications of ovarian cancer while receiving treatment.

She was survived by her stepfather, Clive Baker and an aunt, Hilda Castang.

== Broadway ==
- Whose Life is it Anyway? - as Mrs. Boyle (April 17, 1979 - October 27, 1979)
- The National Health - as Sister McPhee (October 10, 1974 - November 23, 1974)
- How's the World Treating You? (understudy)

== Off-Broadway ==
- Cloud 9 as Maud/Lin at the Lucille Lortel Theatre
- Bonjour, La, Bonjour as Lucienne at the Marymount Manhattan Theatre
- Statements After an Arrest Under the Immorality Act as Frieda Joubert at Stage 73
- Ionescopade at Theatre Four
- The Trigon at Stage 73
