= Shelina Zahra Janmohamed =

British writer (born 1974)

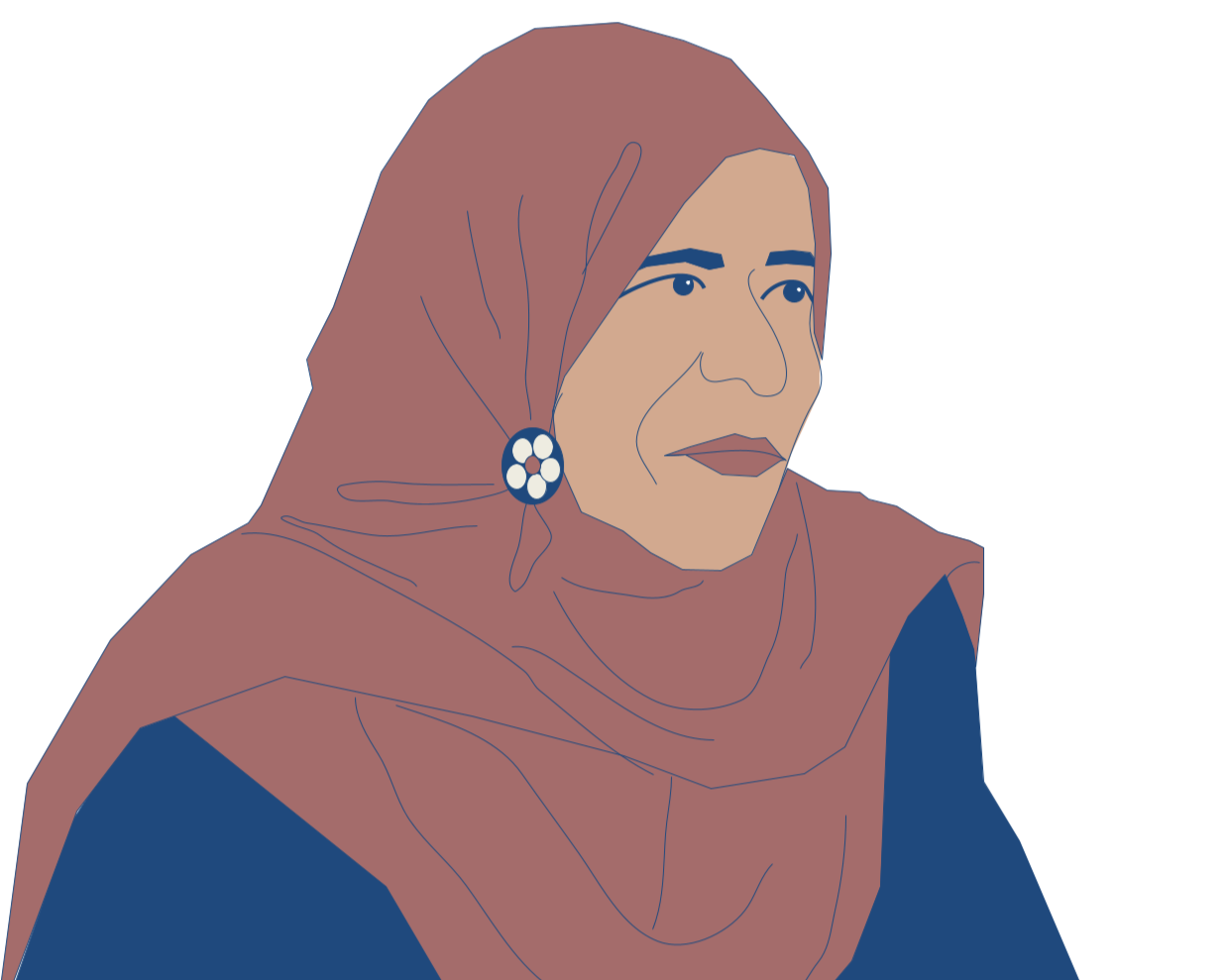

Shelina Zahra Janmohamed (born 13 April 1974) is a British writer. She is the author of Love in a Headscarf (2009), a memoir of growing up as a British Muslim woman. Her book titled Generation M: Young Muslims Changing the World was published in August 2016. Generation M, as The Guardian puts it, "is the first detailed portrait" of the influential segment of the world’s "fastest growing religion", Islam. She is a blogger: her blog is called Spirit 21.

== Early life and education ==
Janmohamed was born on 13 April 1974 and grew up in North London. She is of East African and South Asian descent. Her "fairly liberal" parents had emigrated from Tanzania in 1964.

Janmohamed attended Haberdashers' Aske's School for Girls in Elstree. She went on to graduate from New College, Oxford.

== Career ==
Janmohamed is a regular contributor and writer for several news outlets and magazines, including the BBC, ITV, The Times, The Guardian, The National, The Muslim News, Emel magazine, The Independent and The Telegraph. focusing on Islam and current affairs. She has a particular interest in Muslim women and Islam in the West.

Her blog, Spirit21, has won several awards, including the Brass Crescent Award for Best Blog. Janmohamed lives in London and has appeared on numerous British television networks.

She has travelled with the British Foreign and Commonwealth office to Darfur, Egypt, Saudi Arabia, Indonesia, Qatar and Turkey under its programme to build links with British Muslims and encourage dialogue. She is a creator and organizer of social and cultural events for young British Muslims, as part of creating a new British Muslim culture and identity, and the host of the annual ‘Eid in the Square’ event which is held in Trafalgar Square. She is a trustee of the Windsor Fellowship which encourages minority ethnic students to excel in education and employment.

She is serving as a Vice President of Ogilvy Noor, world's first Islamic Branding & marketing consultancy agency.

== Personal life ==
She is married and currently lives in London with her two children.

== Awards and honours ==
- Janmohamed was named by The Times and the UK Equality and Human Rights Commission as one of the UK's 100 most influential Muslim women, and most recently she was named as one of the 500 most influential Muslims in the world.
- In October 2013, she was included in the BBC's 100 Women.
- In January 2014, Janmohamed was nominated for the Services to Media award at the British Muslim Awards.
- In October 2014, she was included again in the BBC's 100 Women.

== Views ==
Janmohamed has stated the need for brands to improve their marketing aimed at Muslim consumers, urging them to conduct better research and to work harder at 'humanising' Muslims by treating them the same as they would any other demographic, saying:

As marketers, we do that for all sorts of audiences. We humanise them and dig into where the brand has a role to play and somehow when it comes to Muslim audiences, all of the decades of professional experience and expertise somehow goes out the window.

Janmohamed has criticised the current Home Secretary Sajid Javid for dismissing a request made by the Muslim Council of Britain for the Conservative party to carry out an independent inquiry into Islamophobia. In an article for The National, she wrote:

When Muslims do talk about Islamophobia, they are accused of playing the victim, throwing the word around to draw attention to themselves. Yet the evidence is clear in the letter but also in all the statistics, from violence to inequality in education, health and employment. Many Muslims are victims.
