= Karen Liebreich =

Karen Liebreich (born 1959) is a British author, historian and gardener.

== Biography ==
Liebreich was born in London, and educated at Haberdashers' Aske's School for Girls. She studied history at University College London and the European University Institute, before completing a PhD at the University of Cambridge. She worked as the cultural assistant at the French Institute in London, and then as a producer at the BBC and the History Channel, where she worked on historical documentaries. Between 2005 and 2009, she ran a historic kitchen garden in Chiswick House, West London, and was the co-founder of Abundance London, a community garden and urban harvesting project. In 2013, she was awarded an MBE for services to horticulture and education From 2015 to 2018, working with Sarah Cruz also of Abundance London, she created the Chiswick Timeline, a vast, spectacular mural of historic maps of Chiswick from 1593 to the present day, covering almost 60 metres of the London Underground bridge arches crossing Turnham Green Terrace, including works of art by famous artists with links to Chiswick such as William Hogarth, with some specifically created for the mural by Sir Peter Blake and Jan Pieńkowski. In 2020 she co-founded the Chiswick Flower Market, part of a project to reinvigorate the local High Road. She is a non-fiction author and occasional journalist.

== Works ==
In 2004, Liebreich wrote Fallen Order, an exposé of sexual abuse in the Catholic Church in the 17th century. While researching her doctorate, Liebreich discovered documents in the Vatican archives indicating that the Piarist Order, an order dedicated to providing education to poorer children, had covered up a sexual abuse scandal involving some of their priests. This scandal had subsequently contributed to the order's temporary suppression in 1646.

In 2006, Liebreich wrote The Letter in the Bottle about her research to identify the mother who wrote a message in a bottle to express her enduring grief over the death of her son at the age of 13. The 2009 French translation received substantial media coverage in France and was dramatised for a BBC Radio 4 Afternoon Play in December 2012.

In 2009, Liebreich wrote The Family Kitchen Garden, based on her experiences restoring and preserving a historic kitchen garden in the grounds of Chiswick House.

In 2017 Liebreich published The Black Page – interviews with Nazi Film-makers based on her first-hand interviews conducted in the making of various BBC documentaries. An essay based on this on Brunhilde Pomsel, Goebbels's secretary, was published by the London Review of Books after the death of Pomsel in January 2017.

In 2018, after more than three years' work, the Chiswick Timeline was formally opened, with an accompanying book.

In 2020, Liebreich published An Objective History detailing her family's experiences during the Second World War.

== Bibliography ==
- The Complete Skier: A Practical Guide for Skiers (ISBN 978-0563363804)
- Unexplained: Spine-Tingling Tales of Real Places Around the British Isles (ISBN 978-0330341059)
- Fallen Order: Intrigue, Heresy, and Scandal in the Rome of Galileo and Caravaggio (ISBN 978-0802142207)
- The Family Kitchen Garden: How to Plant, Grow, and Cook Together (ISBN 978-1604690507)
- The Letter in the Bottle (ISBN 978-1848875777)
- The Black Page (ISBN 978-0956916433)
