= 5th (Cyclist) Battalion, East Yorkshire Regiment =

2nd Volunteer Bn, East Yorkshire Regiment 5th (Cyclist) Bn, East Yorkshire Regiment
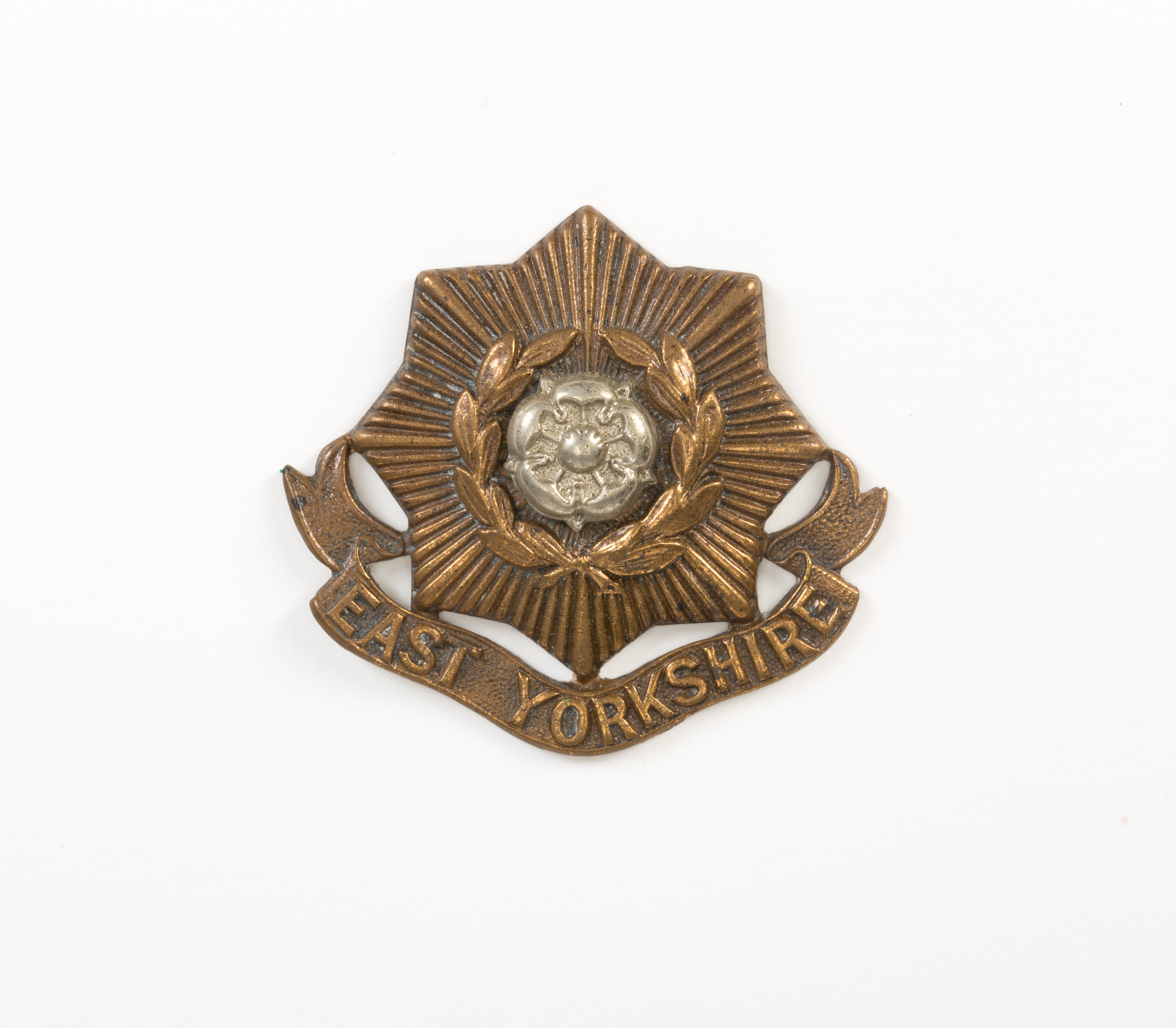
- Cap badge of the East Yorkshire Regiment, granted to the battalion in 1885
- Active: 1860–1920
- Country: United Kingdom
- Branch: Territorial Force
- Type: Infantry; Cycle troops
- Role: Mobile coastal defence
- Size: Battalion
- Part of: Northern Command
- Garrison/HQ: Beverley (2nd VB); Hull (5th Bn)

Commanders
- Notable commanders: Lt-Col Sir Robert Aske

The 5th (Cyclist) Battalion, East Yorkshire Regiment was a mobile coast defence unit of Britain's Territorial Force. It was formed in 1908 from a nucleus provided by a Volunteer battalion first raised in 1859. It carried out its defence duties along the East Coast throughout World War I and after the war it was incorporated into a unit of the new Royal Corps of Signals.

== Volunteer Force ==
The enthusiasm for the Volunteer movement following an invasion scare in 1859 saw the creation of many Rifle Volunteer Corps (RVCs) composed of part-time soldiers eager to supplement the Regular British Army in time of need. A public meeting to form an RVC in Kingston upon Hull (Hull) in the East Riding of Yorkshire was held in February 1859, but the proposal was defeated by an active minority on political grounds. However, another meeting held on 21 May resolved to raise the East Yorkshire Rifle Volunteers, and 10 independent company-sized RVCs were quickly formed, their officers receiving their commissions the following year. In 1860 these were formed into two battalions: the 1st (Consolidated) Battalion, comprising all the RVCs in Hull, and the 2nd (Administrative) Battalion East York Rifle Volunteers incorporating those outside the town:

- 3rd (Howdenshire) Yorkshire (East Riding) RVC, 28 March 1860 – replacing an earlier 3rd (Hull) RVC absorbed into 1st Bn
- 5th (Bridlington) Yorkshire (East Riding) RVC, 19 January 1860
- 6th (Beverley) Yorkshire (East Riding) RVC, 28 February 1860
- 8th (Driffield) Yorkshire (East Riding) RVC, 11 May 1860
- 9th (Market Weighton) Yorkshire (East Riding) RVC – formed as a sub-division 12 May 1860, increased into a full company in 1865 when it replaced a short-lived 9th (Hull) RVC
- 10th (Hedon) Yorkshire (East Riding) RVC, 8 November 1860 – disbanded 1876
- 11th (Pocklington) Yorkshire (East Riding) RVC – formed 8 August 1868 under the command of Lord Muncaster, formerly of the Rifle Brigade

The first commanding officer (CO) of the 2nd (Admin) Battalion was Major (later Lieutenant-Colonel) P. Saltmarshe, formerly of the 8th Hussars, with his headquarters (HQ) at Beverley. After the consolidated battalion became the 1st Yorkshire (East Riding) RVC the administrative battalion took the number 1 (though there were no others in the East Riding). It consolidated as the 2nd Yorkshire (East Riding) RVC in 1880 when the constituent RVCs became A to F Companies. The two corps became the 1st and 2nd Volunteer Battalions (VBs) of the East Yorkshire Regiment in 1883.

From the 1870s to the 1890s the two VBs organised their own annual training camps, usually at Bridlington. Higher formations for the Volunteers were lacking, but from 1875 various mobilisation schemes for the Regulars and Militia began to be circulated, and by 1880 a number of Local Brigades had begun to appear in the Army List. B Company of the 2nd VB was included in Local Brigade No 25 at Bridlington, along with two batteries of volunteer artillery. Following the Stanhope Memorandum of December 1888 a comprehensive mobilisation scheme was introduced for Volunteer units, which would assemble in their own brigades at key points in case of war. In peacetime these brigades provided a structure for collective training. The two East Yorkshire VBs did not at first form part of the East Yorkshire Brigade, whose designated place of assembly was Doncaster, but were attached to it by the end of the 1890s when its headquarters was at Scarborough, North Yorkshire. By 1902 they were brigaded with the VBs of the Green Howards as the Yorkshire Brigade at Richmond, North Yorkshire, and later formed the Humber Brigade based at Beverley, together with battalions from the West Riding of Yorkshire and Lincolnshire across the Humber.

The late Victorian era saw a craze for cycling and the Volunteer Force took a leading role in developing the new Safety bicycle for military use. In 1893 the East Yorkshire VBs raised a cyclist section that proved so popular that it was enlarged into a full company.

== South Africa ==
After Black Week in December 1899, the Volunteers were invited to send active service units to assist the Regulars in the Second Boer War. The War Office decided that one company 116 strong could be recruited from the volunteer battalions of any infantry regiment that had a regular battalion serving in South Africa. The two VBs accordingly raised a service company under Major Mortimer of Driffield to serve with the 2nd Battalion. This earned the VBs the Battle Honour 'South Africa 1900–01'.

== Territorial Force ==
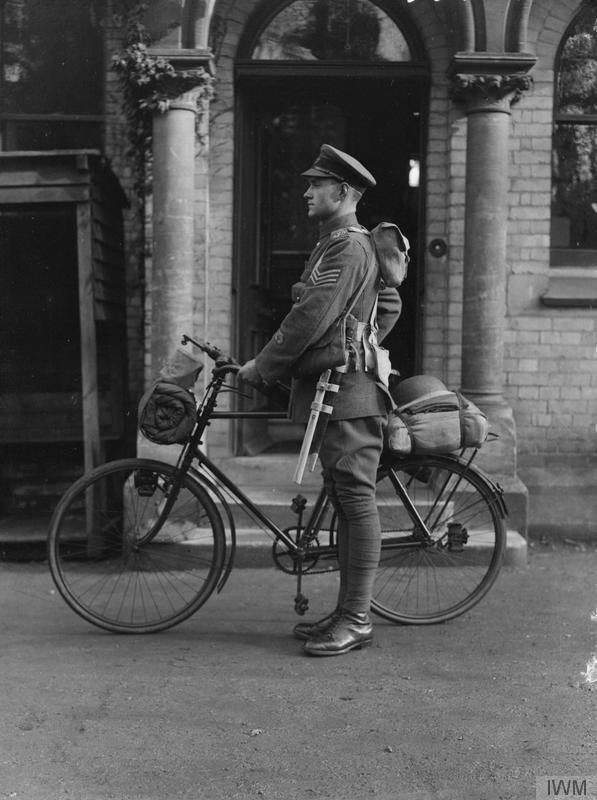
British Army cyclist in marching order, 1914–18.

When the Volunteers were subsumed into the new Territorial Force (TF) under the Haldane Reforms of 1908, the 2nd VB including the cyclist company formed the nucleus of the 5th (Cyclist) Battalion, East Yorkshire Regiment, although the new unit's HQ and half the companies were based in Hull: (Note: The 5th Bn was considered a new unit and did not receive the 'South Africa 1900–01' Battle Honour earned by the 2nd VB.)

- HQ at Park Street, Hull (formerly the Artillery Barracks occupied by the 2nd East Riding Artillery Volunteers)
- A, B, C, and D Companies at Hull
- E Company at Shire Hall, Market Place, Howden
- F Company at Greyburn Lane, Beverley; Drill Hall, Southgate, Hessle; Southgate, Market Weighton; and Barmby Road, Pocklington
- G Company at Armoury, Quay Road, Bridlington; Drill Hall, Middle Street South, Driffield; Hunmanby; and Filey
- H Company at Hedon and Withernsea

The cyclist battalions were not included in the TF's main divisional structure but were instead given the role of using their mobility to defend vulnerable sectors of the coastline and maintain communications between the static defence units. The 5th Bn East Yorkshires fulfilled this role in Northern Command.

== World War I ==
Local politician and commanding officer of the 1/5th (Cyclist) Bn Sir Robert Aske.

On the declaration of war in August 1914 the battalion mobilised at Park Street under the command of Lt-Col Sir Robert Aske, a local lawyer and politician who was first commissioned into the 1st VB on 9 February 1898 and became Commanding Officer of the 5th Bn on 20 August 1910. It moved out to its designated war station at Louth, Lincolnshire to begin patrolling the coastline from Tetney to Skegness.

Shortly after the outbreak of war, TF units were invited to volunteer for Overseas Service. On 15 August 1914, the War Office issued instructions to separate those men who had signed up for Home Service only, and form these into reserve units. On 31 August, the formation of a reserve or 2nd Line unit was authorised for each 1st Line unit where 60 per cent or more of the men had volunteered for Overseas Service. The titles of these 2nd Line units would be the same as the original, but distinguished by a '2/' prefix, and would be filled up with the recruits who were flooding in for both the TF and 'Kitchener's Army'.

At first, competition was keen to join the Cyclist Battalion, which was seen as rather glamorous, with distinctive knee breeches and black bugle buttons. However, the battalion lost out to the other units being formed in Hull, particularly the 'Hull Pals', a full brigade of whom were raised for Kitchener's Army by Lord Nunburnholme. In March 1915 the cycle unit was designated 1/5th Battalion, in expectation of a 2nd Line unit, but it appears that the 2/5th Battalion was never formed – in November 1914 the battalion still required 900 recruits. Those men who had enlisted for home service only were formed into 2nd Provisional Cyclist Company on 4 July 1915. The latter served in the Humber Defences until it was disbanded on 13 April 1916 after the Military Service Act 1916 swept away the Home/Foreign service distinction.

The 1/5th (Cyclist) Battalion patrolled the Lincolnshire coast through the winter of 1914–15, day and night, in all weathers. In May 1915 it moved to Withernsea on the Yorkshire Coast, and subsequently to Roos, with its companies distributed between Spurn Head and Bridlington. In January 1916 it adopted the modern four-company organisation in place of eight companies, and was allotted to the northern section of the Humber Defences. (Note: The battalion may have later moved to Newbiggin-by-the-Sea and become part of the Tyne Garrison.) Sir Robert Aske retired and was transferred to the TF Reserve on 24 December 1917; he was later awarded the Territorial Decoration.

The battalion never saw active service, though a number of officers and men served with other battalions of the East Yorkshires. It was demobilised on 24 January 1919 at Hull.

== Disbandment ==
After the war the battalion was reformed on 7 February 1920, but shortly afterwards cyclist battalions were abolished and it was amalgamated into 50th (Northumbrian) Divisional Signals in the new Royal Corps of Signals. The merged unit moved its HQ to 4 West Parade in Hull, but later it went to Darlington. (Note: A new 5th Bn East Yorkshires was formed in 1939 as a wartime duplicate of the 4th Bn.)

== Uniforms and insignia ==
The first meeting of the East Yorkshire Rifle Volunteers in Hull in 1859 decided that the uniform would be green. However, the Vice Lord Lieutenant objected, asserting that the Battle of Inkerman had shown that the grey worn by Russian troops was less visible at shorter distances than Rifle green. Reluctantly the units agreed to a uniform of 'Volunteer' grey with black braid and red facings and trouser stripe. The headgear was a grey Shako with black leather peak and top. The belts and pouch were black leather. In 1880 a scarlet tunic was adopted with white facings, blue trousers with red stripe, and white belts. The headgear was the Home Service helmet for officers, a Glengarry cap for other ranks. In 1885 the VBs were granted the right to wear the cap badge of the East Yorkshire Regiment. In 1903 the Cyclist Company adopted a Khaki service dress with a Slouch hat. The rest of the battalion adopted khaki in 1906.

== Honorary Colonels ==
The following served as Honorary Colonel of the unit and its predecessor:

- William Henry Forester Denison, 1st Earl of Londesborough (1834–1900) appointed to 2nd VB 9 September 1893
- William Francis Henry Denison, 2nd Earl of Londesborough (1864–1917) appointed to 2nd VB 4 August 1900; to 5th Bn 1 October 1909
- Capt Charles Wilson, 2nd Baron Nunburnholme, CB, DSO, appointed 21 November 1917

== External sources ==
- The Drill Hall Project
- The Long, Long Trail
- Land Forces of Britain, the Empire and Commonwealth – Regiments.org (archive site)
- Wartime Memories Project
