= Linda Cardozo =

British urogynaecologist (1950–2023)

Linda Cardozo OBE
- Born: 15 September 1950
- Died: 21 September 2023 (aged 73)
- Education: University of Liverpool
- Medical career
- Profession: Gynaecologist; Academic; Medical author
- Field: Urogynaecology
- Institutions: King's College Hospital
- Awards: OBE; Doctor Honoris Causa, University of Athens (2016)

Linda Dolores Cardozo OBE (15 September 1950 – 21 September 2023) was a British gynaecologist and professor of urogynaecology at King's College Hospital, London. Cardozo received a lifetime achievement award from the International Urogynaecological Association, was appointed an Officer of the Order of the British Empire 2014 for services to urogynaecology and women's health. In 2016 she received a Doctor Honoris Causa from the University of Athens.

== Biography ==
Cardozo was educated at Haberdashers' Aske's School for Girls until December 1968, and subsequently graduated from the University of Liverpool in 1974 with an MB ChB and received her MD in 1979. From 1995 she has held the position of President of the Association of Chartered Physiotherapists in Women's Health. She wrote and published books on obstetrics and gynaecology. She was professor of urogynaecology at King's College Hospital, London.

In September 2007, she spoke out against the growing popularity of cosmetic vaginal surgery, saying little evidence exists to advise women on the safety or effectiveness of procedures.

In 2013, she received a lifetime achievement award from the International Urogynaecological Association. She was appointed Officer of the Order of the British Empire (OBE) in the 2014 New Year Honours for services to urogynaecology and women's health. In 2016 she received a Doctor Honoris Causa from the University of Athens.

Cardozo died in her sleep whilst on a plane from London to Nice, on 21 September 2023, at the age of 73.
