= 1926 Kingston upon Hull Central by-election =

UK parliamentary by-election

The 1926 Kingston upon Hull Central by-election was fought on 29 November 1926 when Joseph Kenworthy changed party allegiance from the Liberal Party to the Labour Party and sought re-election with the change of party allegiance. Kenworthy retained the seat.

1926 Kingston upon Hull Central by-election
Party	Candidate	Votes	%	±%
Labour	Joseph Kenworthy	16,145	52.9	New
Conservative	Lancelot Evelyn Gaunt	11,466	37.6	−8.3
Liberal	Charles Kerr	2,885	9.5	−44.6
Majority		4,679	15.3	N/A
Turnout		30,496	82.8	+5.7
Labour gain from Liberal		Swing		
