= Sir Robert Aske, 1st Baronet =

British politician

Robert Aske in 1910

Sir Robert William Aske, 1st Baronet (29 December 1872 – 10 March 1954) was a barrister and Liberal Party politician in the United Kingdom.

== Family ==
Aske was born a son of Edward Aske. In 1899 he married Edith McGregor. She died in 1900. In 1909 he married Edith Cockerline. They had two sons and two daughters. She died in 1918.

== Military career ==
Aske was a part-time soldier, commissioned into a Volunteer battalion of the East Yorkshire Regiment on 9 February 1898 and was promoted to Lt-Colonel and commanding officer of the 5th (Cyclist) Battalion, East Yorkshire Regiment of the Territorial Force (TF) on 20 October 1910. He mobilised the battalion in August 1914 and commanded it on coast defence duties during the early years of World War I. He retired from the battalion and was transferred to the TF Reserve on 24 December 1917; he was awarded the Territorial Decoration on 22 May 1918.

== Political career ==
He first stood for parliament in 1910, contesting Hull Central, a seat that the Conservatives had held in the 1906 Liberal landslide. Though it was not a promising seat, he did very well, coming to within 20 votes of defeating the incumbent. A third opportunity came to contest Hull Central at a by-election. His Conservative opponent had been unseated on petition. However he was again unsuccessful. He was Chairman of the Hull and District Liberal Federation. He did not contest Hull Central again and did not stand for parliament again until 1923. At the 1923 general election he was elected as Member of Parliament (MP) for Newcastle upon Tyne East, but lost his seat a year later, at the 1924 general election, to Labour's Martin Henry Connolly. Aske regained the seat at the 1929 general election, and held it until his retirement at the 1945 general election. When the Liberal Party split in 1931 over participation in Ramsay MacDonald's Conservative-dominated National Government, Aske was one those who broke away to form the new National Liberal Party, which merged in 1948 with the Conservatives.

He was knighted in 1911. He was created a baronet in the 1922 New Year Honours. He served as a Justice of the peace in Surrey. He served as Deputy Sheriff of Hull on three occasions.

=== Electoral record ===
General election January 1910: Hull Central
| Party | Candidate | Votes | % | ±% |
|---|---|---|---|---|
| Conservative | Seymour King | 3,606 | 50.1 | −7.7 |
| Liberal | Robert Aske | 3,586 | 49.9 | +7.7 |
| Majority | | 20 | 0.2 | −15.4 |
| Turnout | | 7,192 | 87.9 | +3.1 |
| Registered electors | | 8,181 | | |
| Conservative hold | | Swing | −7.7 | |

General election December 1910: Hull Central
| Party | Candidate | Votes | % | ±% |
|---|---|---|---|---|
| Conservative | Seymour King | 3,625 | 51.5 | +1.4 |
| Liberal | Robert Aske | 3,418 | 48.5 | −1.4 |
| Majority | | 207 | 3.0 | +2.8 |
| Turnout | | 7,043 | 86.1 | −1.8 |
| Registered electors | | 8,181 | | |
| Conservative hold | | Swing | +2.4 | |

1911 Kingston upon Hull Central by-election
| Party | Candidate | Votes | % | ±% |
|---|---|---|---|---|
| Conservative | Mark Sykes | 3,823 | 51.9 | +0.4 |
| Liberal | Robert Aske | 3,545 | 48.1 | −0.4 |
| Majority | | 278 | 3.8 | +0.8 |
| Turnout | | 7,368 | 84.6 | −1.5 |
| Registered electors | | 8,712 | | |
| Conservative hold | | Swing | +0.4 | |

General election 1923: Newcastle upon Tyne East
| Party | Candidate | Votes | % | ±% |
|---|---|---|---|---|
| Liberal | Robert Aske | 12,656 | 52.3 | +22.3 |
| Labour | Arthur Henderson | 11,532 | 47.7 | +4.6 |
| Majority | | 1,124 | 4.6 | N/A |
| Turnout | | 24,188 | 73.2 | −0.5 |
| Registered electors | | 33,066 | | |
| Liberal gain from Labour | | Swing | +8.9 | |

General election 1924: Newcastle upon Tyne East
| Party | Candidate | Votes | % | ±% |
|---|---|---|---|---|
| Labour | Martin Connolly | 13,120 | 46.4 | −1.3 |
| Liberal | Robert Aske | 12,776 | 45.1 | −7.2 |
| Unionist | William Temple | 2,420 | 8.5 | N/A |
| Majority | | 344 | 1.3 | N/A |
| Turnout | | 28,316 | 83.9 | +10.7 |
| Registered electors | | 33,737 | | |
| Labour gain from Liberal | | Swing | +3.0 | |

General election 1929: Newcastle upon Tyne East
| Party | Candidate | Votes | % | ±% |
|---|---|---|---|---|
| Liberal | Robert Aske | 17,856 | 51.3 | +6.2 |
| Labour | Martin Connolly | 16,921 | 48.7 | +2.3 |
| Majority | | 935 | 2.6 | N/A |
| Turnout | | 34,777 | 79.4 | −4.5 |
| Registered electors | | 43,797 | | |
| Liberal gain from Labour | | Swing | +2.0 | |

General election 1931: Newcastle upon Tyne East
| Party | Candidate | Votes | % | ±% |
|---|---|---|---|---|
| National Liberal | Robert Aske | 24,552 | 63.4 | |
| Labour | Maurice Alexander | 14,176 | 36.6 | |
| Majority | | 10,346 | 26.8 | |
| Turnout | | | 86.5 | |
| National Liberal gain from Liberal | | Swing | | |

General election 1935: Newcastle upon Tyne East
| Party | Candidate | Votes | % | ±% |
|---|---|---|---|---|
| National Liberal | Robert Aske | 23,146 | 58.60 | |
| Labour | Bernard Benjamin Gillis | 16,322 | 41.4 | |
| Majority | | 6,824 | 17.2 | |
| Turnout | | | 81.3 | |
| National Liberal hold | | Swing | | |

== Sources ==
- Leigh Rayment's list of baronets
- Leigh Rayment's Historical List of MPs

Parliament of the United Kingdom
| Preceded by Arthur Henderson | Member of Parliament for Newcastle upon Tyne East; 1923–1924 | Succeeded by Martin Connolly |
| Preceded by Martin Connolly | Member of Parliament for Newcastle upon Tyne East; 1929–1945 | Succeeded by Arthur Blenkinsop |
Baronetage of the United Kingdom
| New creation | Baronet (of Aughton); 1922–1954 | Succeeded by Conan Aske |
