= Sophie Deen =

Children's author and coding educator

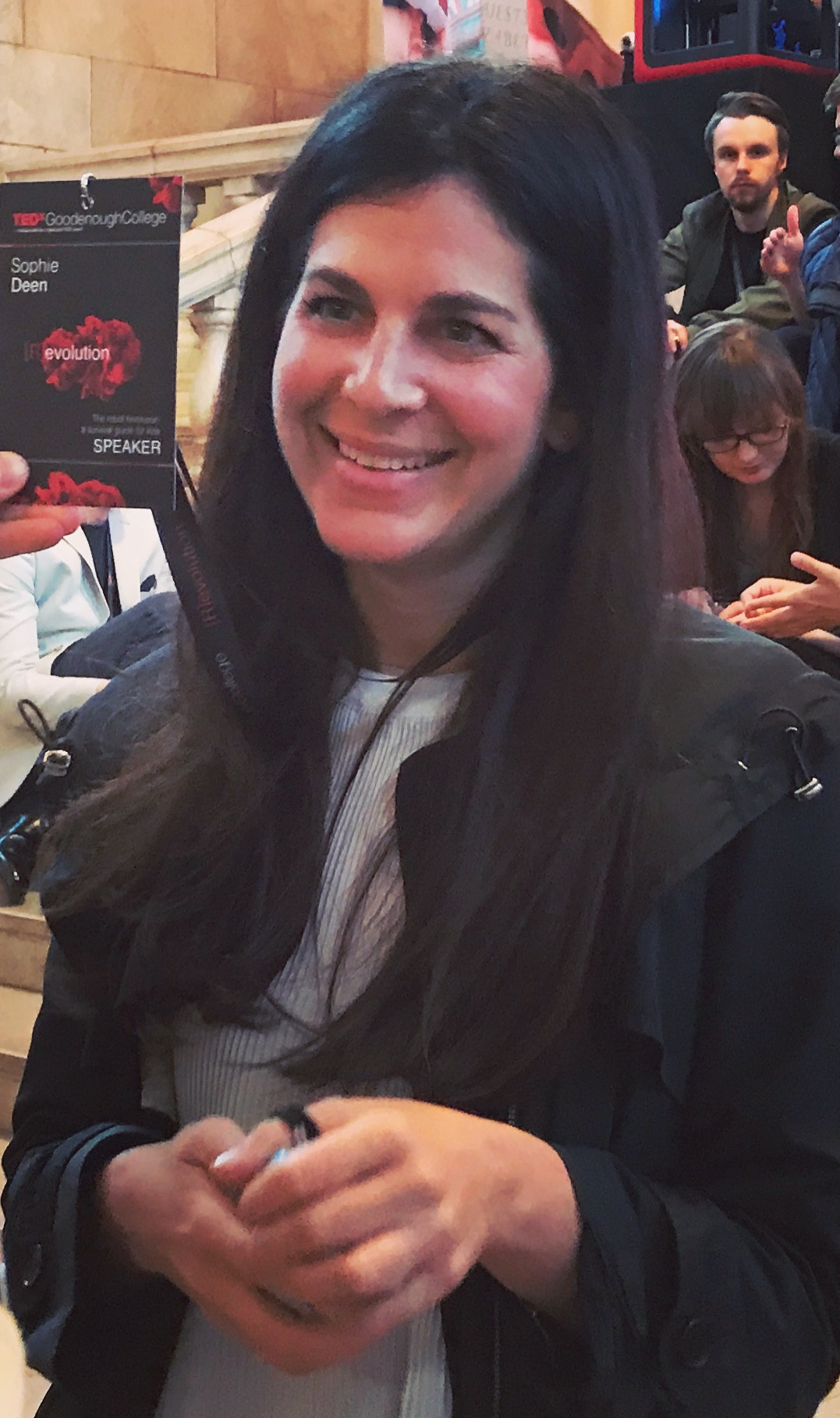
- Deen in 2017
- Education: University of Sheffield (BA, 2005)
- Occupations: Author and coding educator
- Known for: Children's books

Sophie Deen is a British children's author and leader in the field of coding and STEM for young people. She is the CEO of Bright Little Labs, a kids media company that makes animations, books, games and toys with a focus on 21st-century skills, inclusive role models, and sustainability.

== Early life ==
Deen attended Haberdashers' Aske's School for Girls from 1989 until 1999, leaving after GCSEs. She received a bachelor's degree in law at the University of Sheffield in 2005, before completing a Legal Practise Course at The College of Law.

== Career ==
Deen worked as a lawyer at Herbert Smith Freehills, before joining SamKnows. Deen realised she wanted to work with children, and became a school counsellor with Place2Be.

She worked for Code Club, where she helped to introduce the new coding curriculum for the United Kingdom with Google and the Department for Education. In 2014 Deen was appointed head of Code Club Pro, which ran training sessions for teachers. At Code Club Deen recognised a large group of young people who could not engage.

In 2015, Deen founded Bright Little Labs, who use "edutaining" stories to get children to learn to code. Following a survey of over a thousand people, Deen found the negative stereotypes in technology are reflected in children's cartoons. In an interview with The Guardian, she said that "by age eight, children think that some things are for boys, some things are for girls – from toys to future careers". Her research revealed that "In kids' cartoons under three per cent of characters are black." The project raised £14,500 on Kickstarter. It has reached over 30 countries worldwide.

The Kickstarter project resulted in children’s book, Detective Dot, which was first published in 2016.Detective Dot is a fictional character who works for the Children's Intelligence Agency (CIA), and invites readers to "become agents, go on missions and do investigations". Dot's challenges are inspired by citizen science and help young people to engage with data in a real-world way. Bright Little Labs are working with educators, illustrators and writers to create stories and content linked to the computer science curriculum. In 2017 it was listed by The Independent as one of the "10 best coding toys", by the Evening Standard as one of the "best coding toys and games for kids 2018" and one of the "Best STEM toys 2019" by The Sun.

In 2016, the tech-for-good investment fund Bethnal Green Ventures invested in Little Labs.

In 2017, Deen delivered a TEDx talk at Goodenough College, "The robot revolution – a survival guide for kids".

In July 2018, Turner International (now WarnerMedia) made a strategic equity investment into Bright Little Labs, to power their growth, marking the group's first entry into the edutainment space. Patricia Hidalgo, Chief Content Officer EMEA & International Kids Strategy for Turner, said: "Turner shares with Bright Little Labs a passion for engaging kids in a way which is original and immersive. We see multiple opportunities to leverage our kids' expertise to further develop BLL's existing business and engage kids in a way that while putting entertainment first also equips them for the skills they need for today's 21st century world."

In 2018, Bright Little Labs opened a live Children's Intelligence Agency activity at Kidzania, London, where children develop their spy, computing and coding skills, by saving Kidzania from a computer virus, marking Bright Little Labs entry into live events.

In July 2020, Walker Books announced they were publishing the Agent Asha fiction series from Bright Little Labs. Commissioning editor Daisy Jellicoe acquired world rights from United Agents. In an interview with The Bookseller, Deen said: "Agent Asha shows kids how to navigate the modern world, with empowering role models and a hi-tech spy agency." Jellicoe added: "The series brings computer science and coding to life in such an engaging and exciting way, with an evil trillionaire, deadly sharks and a farting selfie stick. Sophie’s belief in the importance of digital literacy and critical thinking skills for all children, regardless of their background, is inspiring and Agent Asha is without a doubt a much-need protagonist for the world today."

In an interview with Computer Weekly, Deen said she created the Agent Asha series to "ensure that everyone has access to, and is empowered to have, a voice in our increasingly digital world," she said. "Over the last decade, coding has become a basic literacy, like reading and writing. It's the number one sought-after skill in employees, and workers with coding skills get paid the highest wages. Yet not everyone is able to access these skills."

In 2020, Vogue recommended the Agent Asha Children's Spy Agency Activity Gift Pack for any budding adventurers.

Sophie is represented by United Agents.

== Published works ==
Author of Agent Asha: Shark Bytes, published by Walker Books in 2020

Published by Walker Books in 2020, "Mission Shark Bytes" is the first book in the Agent Asha trilogy by Sophie Deen, featuring illustrations by Anjan Sarkar. Protagonist Asha, a recruit of the Children's Spy Agency, uses her coding skills to prevent Shelly Belly from monopolising global internet access through the destruction of underwater cables with robotic sharks. The story offers a blend of espionage, tech, and a race against time.

Shark Bytes has been nominated for the following awards:-

- Shortlisted for Royal Society Young People's Book Prize 2021
- Named the Best Coding + STEM Toy by Tech Advisor in 2022
- Included in 2022's Summer Reading Challenge in the UK
- Shortlisted for the Little Rebels Award (radical fiction for young readers)
- Nominated for the CRIMEFEST Award for Best Crime Novel for Children (ages 8–12)
- Recognised as the "Best STEM Book" by The Sun in 2019

Author of Agent Asha: Cyber Chop, published by Walker Books in 2022

Published by Walker Books in 2022, "Operation Cyber Chop" is the second instalment in the Agent Asha series by Sophie Deen, featuring illustrations by Priyanka Sachdev and cover art by Elvira Lanzafame. The narrative follows Asha Joshi, a top coder and spy, as she unravels a plot by a tech trillionaire to replace natural trees with CyberOaks in her favourite park. The book seamlessly integrates STEM concepts into its adventure storyline, aligning with key KS1 and KS2 National Curriculum Computing concepts such as algorithms, conditionals, and debugging.

Author of Detective Dot, published by Bright Little Labs in 2016

'Detective Dot', is a story about Dot, an inventive eight-year-old coder, who brings everyday objects to life in unexpected ways. Using her tech-savviness and problem-solving abilities, Dot guides young readers to question the origin and impact of the items they use daily. The narrative takes readers on a global journey, from Indian tea fields to Silicon Valley, revealing the stories behind household objects and promoting a deeper understanding of our interconnected world.

== Honours, decorations, awards and distinctions ==
Listed in the Computer Weekly Top 50 Most Influential Women in Tech shortlist in 2017, 2018, 2019 and 2020.

Named Creative Industries Entrepreneur of the Year for London & East of England finalist at the Great British Entrepreneur Awards 2020 in partnership with Starling Bank.

Named Leading Honouree in Campaign's "Rising to the Top" category for Female Frontiers 2020.

Bright Little Labs named as finalist in the Tech4Good Diversity Awards 2019, sponsored by Nesta and BT.

Sophie Deen was nominated as one of the Top 30 changemakers 2018 by London Tech Week, celebrating companies and people harnessing technology to inspire social and economic impact and drive global innovation.

Winner of the FDM Barclay's Everywoman Award as Startup Founder of the Year 2017. Everywoman in Tech is an award celebrating the achievements of women working in tech and STEM.

Named by the British Interactive Media Association in the top 100 most influential players in the British digital industry in 2017.

Winner of the EDF Energy Pulse Award 2016 for the "Inspiring young people into STEM" category.
