= Cuthbert Kenworthy, 9th Baron Strabolgi =

English peer (1853–1934)

Cuthbert Matthias Kenworthy (24 February 1853–12 February 1934) was the 9th Baron Strabolgi, in the English peerage.

His parents were Joseph Kenworthy and Harriet Elizabeth Leatham. He was educated at Rossall School in Lancashire, and attended Pembroke College, Cambridge. On 15 August 1884 Kenworthy married Elizabeth Florence of Sacramento, California. In January 1913 she was convicted of obtaining money by false pretenses.

In 1909, Kenworthy, along with Alexander Leith and R.G. Alexander, petitioned for the recreation of three baronies that had gone extinct: the baronies of Cobham, Strabolgi, and Burgh. In 1914 the House of Lords granted Kenworthy's petition, and he became the 9th Baron Strabolgi.

He died on 12 February 1934, and his son Joseph succeeded him as 10th Baron Strabolgi.

Preceded by Robert Burgh	Baron Strabolgi; 1914–1934	Succeeded by Joseph Montague Kenworthy
