= Baron Strabolgi =

Title in the Peerage of England

Barony of Strabolgi
- Creation date: 20 October 1318
- Created by: Edward II
- Peerage: Peerage of England
- First holder: David of Strathbogie, 10th Earl of Atholl
- Present holder: Andrew Kenworthy, 12th Baron Strabolgi
- Heir presumptive: Hamish Kenworthy Malcolm
- Remainder to: Heirs general
- Status: Extant
- Motto: Sans bruit ("Without noise")

Baron Strabolgi (pronounced "Strabogie") is a title in the Peerage of England supposedly created in 1318 for Scottish lord David of Strathbogie, 10th Earl of Atholl. Despite lack of evidence supporting its existence, it was called out of abeyance by the House of Lords in 1916. Whether it ever existed before then is open to serious dispute.

== History ==
John of Strathbogie, 9th Earl of Atholl (c. 1266–1306) was imprisoned, stripped of his titles and ultimately executed for fighting against the English crown, but his son David of Strathbogie, 10th Earl of Atholl had his titles restored by Edward II of England sometime between 21 August 1307 and 20 May 1308. He was made Constable of Scotland but stripped of his Scottish titles by 1314 by Robert the Bruce after rebelling against the Scottish king.

According to a 1914 House of Lords' decision, Atholl was called to the Parliament of England by hereditary writ under the barony of Strabolgi, inheritable by heirs general of his body. According to the Lords' decision, upon the death of David de Strabolgi, the third Lord Strabolgi in 1369, the barony fell into abeyance between his daughters and co-heirs Elizabeth, who married Sir Thomas Percy, and Philippa, who married Sir John Halsham.

In 1498, the barony vested upon a sole heir, Sir Edward Burgh, the de jure 4th Baron Strabolgi. It fell into abeyance again upon the death in 1602 of his grandson.

Burke's Peerage is incredulous of the 1914 House of Lords decision affirming that Atholl was called to Parliament as Baron Strabolgi "despite the absence of any writ of summons for him to the English Parl of 20 Oct 1318 or genuine evidence of his sitting in it." Burke's Peerage notes that "even later writs of summons, however, were worded to 'David (de) Strabolgi, comiti (i.e., 'Earl of') Athol;' rather than domini (i.e. lord)."

The Complete Peerage declines to list it, on the grounds that it did not exist before the 20th century.

== Barons Strabolgi (1318) ==
- David of Strathbogie, 10th Earl of Atholl (d. 1326)
- David of Strathbogie, 11th Earl of Atholl (1309–1335)
- David of Strathbogie, 12th Earl of Atholl (1332–1369) (abeyant 1369)
- Edward Burgh, 4th Baron Strabolgi (d. 1528) (abeyance terminated 1496)
- Thomas Burgh, 5th Baron Strabolgi (d. 1550)
- William Burgh, 6th Baron Strabolgi (1522–1584)
- Thomas Burgh, 7th Baron Strabolgi (c. 1555–1597)
- Robert Burgh, 8th Baron Strabolgi (1594–1602) (abeyant 1602)
- Cuthbert Matthias Kenworthy, 9th Baron Strabolgi (1853–1934) (abeyance terminated 1914)
- Joseph Montague Kenworthy, 10th Baron Strabolgi (1886–1953)
- David Montague de Burgh Kenworthy, 11th Baron Strabolgi (1914–2010)
- Andrew David Whitley Kenworthy, 12th Baron Strabolgi (b. 1967)

The heir presumptive is the present holder's third cousin, Hamish Kenworthy Malcolm (b. 1971).
