= Seymour King =

British politician (1852-1933)

Henry Seymour King KCIE
- King in 1895

MP for Kingston upon Hull Central
- In office 1885–1911
- Preceded by: New constituency
- Succeeded by: Mark Sykes

Personal details
- Born: 4 January 1852 Brighton, East Sussex, England
- Died: 14 November 1933 (aged 81) London, England
- Party: Conservative
- Spouse: Julia Mary Jenkins (m. 1875)
- Parent: Henry Samuel King (father)
- Relatives: Edward Jenkins (brother-in-law)
- Education: Charterhouse School
- Alma mater: Balliol College, Oxford

Sir Henry Seymour King, 1st Baronet KCIE (4 January 1852 – 14 November 1933) was a British banker, mountaineer and Conservative politician.

King was born at Brighton, the son of Henry Samuel King. He was educated at Charterhouse School and Balliol College, Oxford, where he won an oratory gold medal. He joined his father in the banking business of Henry S. King & Co. This had been established in 1868, when his father Henry Samuel King took over the banking and India agency work of Smith Elder & Co, booksellers, stationers, East India agents, shippers, and bankers. When his father died in 1878 King became senior partner. He expanded the business which was based on Bombay and Calcutta, to Port Said, Delhi and Simla. He was a well-known banker in London, Bombay and Calcutta. One distinction of the bank was the employment of women as typists, as early as 1887, something which most other banks did not do until the First World War. King also acquired two Indian newspapers - the Overland Mail and the Homeward Mail, which were founded by John William Kaye, the historian of the Indian Mutiny. King's brother in law Edward Jenkins, a former MP for Dundee, became editor of these in 1886.

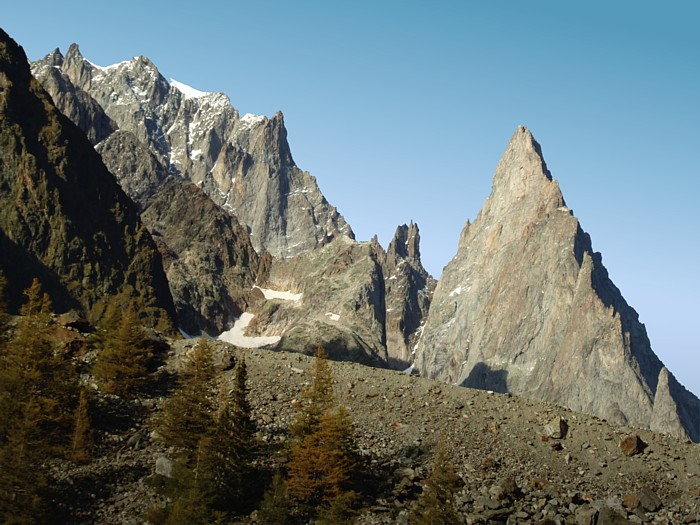
The Aiguilles de Peuterey seen from Val Veny. Aiguille Blanche de Peuterey (extreme left, top), Aiguille Noire de Peuterey (right)

King was an adventurous mountaineer. He was the first to reach the summits of Mont Maudit with William Edward Davidson and guides Johann Jaun d. J. and Johann von Bergen on 12 September 1878, and Aiguille Blanche de Peuterey (Pointe Güssfeldt) with guides Emile Rey, Ambros Supersaxo and Aloys Anthamatten on 31 July 1885. The SE summit of the Aiguille Blanche de Peuterey (4,107 metres (13,474 ft)) is named Point Seymour King in his honour. He was a Fellow of the Royal Geographical Society.

He lived in the Manor House, Chigwell, Essex, England. In 1885 King was elected Member of Parliament for Kingston upon Hull Central. Having previously been a Commander of the Order of the Indian Empire (C.I.E.), he was promoted to Knight Commander of the Order of the Indian Empire (K.C.I.E.) on 15 August 1892. King was the first Mayor of Kensington in 1900 and provided a large interest free loan for the purchase of slum properties in North Kensington so that they could be rebuilt and refurbished. He retained his parliamentary seat until December 1910, when he was unseated on petition on 1 June 1911 for bribing constituents.

King became a director of Lloyds Bank in 1909. After the First World War, he arranged an amalgamation with Messrs Cox & Co, a rival bank and Indian agency. Lloyds absorbed the banking arm of the merged company in February 1923, resulting in the foundation of the Eastern Department of Lloyds with sixteen main branches in India and Burma. The travel side of the business continued as Cox & Kings. King's leisure interests extended to sailing and yachting. King was chairman of the Income Tax Commissioners for the City of London and in recognition of his services was created a Baronet in the 1932 King's Birthday Honours. He was also a member of the Commission of Lieutenancy for the City of London.

== Family ==
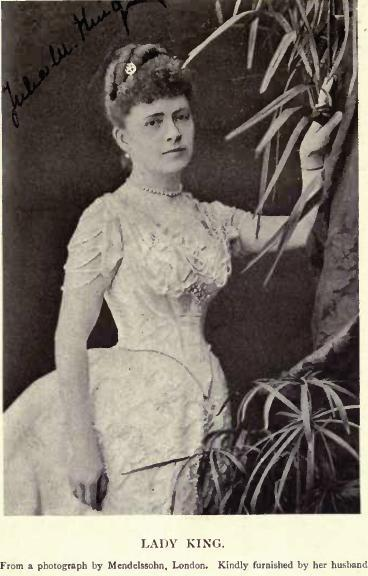
Lady Julie Mary King (née Jenkins) by Mendelssohn London

Henry Seymour King married Julia Mary Jenkins in Montreal, 21 October 1875. She was the daughter of Rev. John Jenkins, D.D., of Montreal, and his wife, Harriette, daughter of the late George Shepstone, Esquire, of Clifton, England. Lady King was Mayoress, for two years, of the Royal Borough of Kensington. During this period, she was president of the Queen's Jubilee Nurses' Endowment Fund, which raised the largest sum contributed by any borough in London, except the city, for that purpose. She was President of the Primrose League at Hull. She accompanied her husband in mountaineering expeditions in Switzerland. She was a keen yachtswoman, who regularly sailed with her husband in their yacht Glory. The couple lived at 25 Cornwall Gardens, South Kensington, London, England.

Parliament of the United Kingdom
| New constituency see Kingston upon Hull | Member of Parliament for Kingston upon Hull Central; 1885 – 1911 | Succeeded by Mark Sykes |
Baronetage of the United Kingdom
| New creation | Baronet (of Cornwall Gardens); 1932–1933 | Extinct |
