= Haberdashers' Girls' School =

Girls' school in Elstree, Hertfordshire, England

Location
- Aldenham Road; Elstree, Hertfordshire, WD6 3BT; United Kingdom; 51°39′15″N 000°18′39″W

Information
- Type: Private day school
- Motto: Making a Profound Impact
- Religious affiliation: Christian
- Established: 1875
- Department for Education URN: 117649 Tables
- Chairman: Simon Cartmell
- Executive Principal: Gus Lock
- Headmistress: Hazel Bagworth-Mann
- Gender: Girls
- Age: 4 to 18
- Houses: Gillett, Gilliland, Harold, Millar, Powell, Sprules
- Colours: Navy blue and red
- Publication: The Greenhouse
- Alumnae: Haberdashers' Old Girls
- Website: http://www.habsgirls.org.uk/

Haberdashers' Girls' School is a private day school in Elstree, Hertfordshire. It is often referred to as "Habs" (or "Habs Girls" to distinguish it from the neighbouring Haberdashers' Boys' School). The school was founded in 1875 by the Worshipful Company of Haberdashers, one of the Great Twelve Livery Companies of the City of London.

== History ==
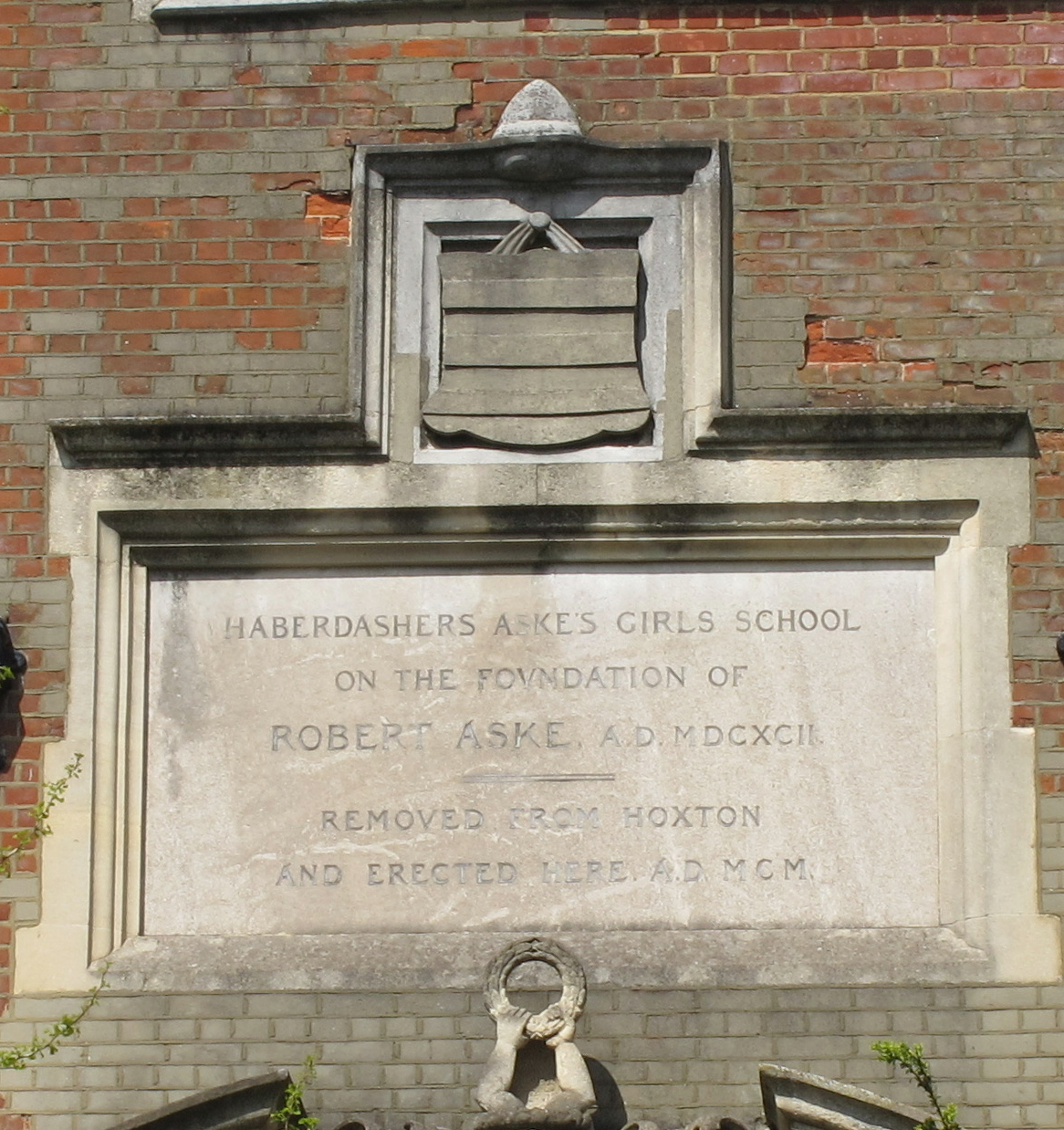
The plaque of the previous campus, now the Japanese School of London

In 1690, Robert Aske gave the Haberdashers' Company £20,000 to set up a hospital and home for 20 elderly men and a school for 20 boys at Hoxton, just north of the City of London. The school came decidedly second to the home for elderly men. There were no new boys between 1714 and 1739 because the foundation was short of funds. The hospital was rebuilt during 1824–26 and the foundation was reorganised in 1873 when four schools were established: two at Hoxton, and two at Hatcham, New Cross in south-east London. Boys and girls were taught separately at each site. All four schools opened in 1875, the Hoxton schools offered a basic English education and the Hatcham schools covered a wider syllabus. In 1891, Hatcham Girls moved to new premises half a mile away, designed by Henry Stock, while Hatcham boys took over the Girls’ buildings.

Early in the 20th century, new sites for the Hoxton schools were purchased in Cricklewood (always referred to as Hampstead) for the Boys and Acton for the Girls. Both these schools became Direct Grant in 1946 and then fully independent, day, fee-paying schools in 1976. Both Hatcham schools became voluntary controlled in 1946, and comprehensives in 1979. The need for expansion saw the Boys’ School move again to Elstree, Hertfordshire in 1961, followed by the Girls in 1974.

The previous site of the Girls' School, in Acton, became the Japanese School in London.

In March 2021, The Spectator reported that the school's governing body would be undertaking a review of their founder, Robert Aske's, legacy, including his ties to slavery. In September 2021, various news reports confirmed that the Aske's name would be dropped from both the names of the Boys' and the Girls' schools, and that they would be henceforth called Haberdashers' Girls' School and Haberdashers' Boys' School. although the name Aske would be retained by their governing body.

== The School ==
=== Academic achievement ===
97% of girls achieve grades A* to B at A Level, and over 99% achieve A* - B at GCSE.

== Headmistresses ==
The current headmistress is Hazel Bagworth-Mann, PhD

- 2019 – 2023 Rose Hardy, MA
- 2011 – 2019 Biddie O'Connor, MA
- 2005 – 2011 Elizabeth Radice, MA
- 1991 – 2005 Penelope Penney, BA
- 1974 – 1991 Sheila Wiltshire, OBE, BSc
- 1969 – 1973 Jessie Gillett, BA
- 1944 – 1968 Eileen Harold, MA
- 1920 – 1943 Dorothy Sprules, MA
- 1904 – 1919 Margaret Gilliland, MA
- 1888 – 1903 Edith Millar
- 1875 – 1888 Elizabeth Powell

== Notable alumnae ==
Former pupils are referred to as Old Girls. Their alumni association is called Haberdashers' Old Girls' Club which was created on 6 May 1904 by Headmistress, Miss Margaret Gilliland. In 2014, they celebrated their 110th anniversary at St Martin-in-the-Fields.

Notable Old Girls:

- Laura Aikman, actress (Class of 2004)
- Emily Arbuthnott Tennis Player.
- Florence Bell (1913–2000), scientist who contributed to the discovery of the structure of DNA.
- Linda Bennett OBE, fashion designer and entrepreneur (Class of 1981)
- Margaret Bent, musicologist (Class of 1959)
- Luciana Berger, former Member of Parliament for Liverpool Wavertree (Class of 1999)
- Bidisha, arts critic, broadcaster and author (Class of 1996)
- Florence Birchenough, member of the first female Olympic team (1894-1973) (Class of 1911)
- Margery Blackie, homeopath to Queen Elizabeth II (1898-1981) (Class of 1916)
- Hilda Buckmaster, politician and naval officer (1897-1993) (Class of 1916)
- Nica Burns OBE, theatre producer (Class of 1973)
- Linda Cardozo OBE, Professor of urogynaecology (Class of 1969)
- Veronica Castang, actress (1938–1988) (Class of 1956)
- Barbara Craig, archaeologist and classicist (1915–2005) (Class of 1933)
- Claire Dalby, botanical artist (Class of 1963)
- Amanda Davies, CNN Sportscaster (Junior School)
- Sophie Deen, children's author (Class of 2001)
- Vanessa Feltz, TV personality and radio broadcaster (Class of 1979)
- Tamara Finkelstein, senior civil servant, Department for Environment, Food and Rural Affairs (Class of 1985)
- Charlotte Green, radio broadcaster (Class of 1974)
- Mary Hocking, author (1921–2014) (Class of 1939)
- Vera Houghton CBE, campaigner (1914–2013) (Class of 1931)
- Shelina Zahra Janmohamed, author (Class of 1992)
- Mabel Lethbridge, writer and the youngest person to be awarded a British Empire Medal for her services in the Great War (Class of 1914)
- Karen Liebreich MBE, author, historian and gardener (Class of 1978)
- Dominique Lloyd-Walter, squash player (Class of 1999)
- Melissa Nathan, journalist and author (1968–2006) (Class of 1986)
- Ann Oakley, author and academic (Class of 1962)
- Talulah Riley, actress (Class of 2004)
- Caroline Ryder, writer (Class of 1995)
- Ritula Shah, journalist and radio presenter (Class of 1985)
- Gaurika Singh, youngest competitor at the 2016 Summer Olympics, Rio de Janeiro, Brazil, who represented Nepal in swimming. She won her heat in the Women's 100m backstroke event.
- Daphne Slater, actress (1928–2012) (Class of 1944)
- Eloise Smith, fencer at 2000 Summer Olympics, Sydney (Class of 1995)

== Controversy ==
In April 2021, an article in the Daily Telegraph claimed that students at the school were "subjected to forced sex" and faced "sexism" from pupils at Haberdashers' Boys' School. Some pupils claimed that cases were reported to the school but were "downplayed".

== See also ==
- List of girls' schools in the United Kingdom

== Publications ==
- HR Dulley, Haberdashers' Girls' School: The First 125 Years (2000). Published by Gresham Books Limited. ISBN 0-946095-40-X
