= Joseph Kenworthy, 10th Baron Strabolgi =

British politician (1886–1953)

Lieutenant Commander Joseph Montague Kenworthy 10th Baron Strabolgi
- Joseph Kenworthy (1920)

MP for Kingston upon Hull Central
- In office 1919–1931
- Preceded by: Mark Sykes
- Succeeded by: Basil Kelsey Barton

Personal details
- Born: 7 March 1886 Royal Leamington Spa, Warwickshire, England
- Died: 8 October 1953 (aged 67)
- Party: Liberal; Labour
- Spouse(s): Doris Whitley (m. 1913; div. 1941) Geraldine Francis
- Children: 4
- Parents: Cuthbert Kenworthy (father); Elizabeth Florence (mother)
- Relatives: David Montague de Burgh Kenworthy (son); Frederick Whitley-Thomson (father-in-law)
- Education: Eastman's Royal Naval Academy
- Military career
- Allegiance: United Kingdom
- Branch: Royal Navy
- Service years: 1901-1920
- Rank: Lieutenant Commander
- Unit: HMS Goliath
- Commands: HMS Bullfinch
- Conflicts: World War I

Joseph Montague Kenworthy, 10th Baron Strabolgi (7 March 1886 – 8 October 1953), was a Liberal and then a Labour Party Member of Parliament in the United Kingdom.

== Education and naval service ==
Strabolgi was born at Leamington in Warwickshire and educated at the Eastman's Royal Naval Academy at Northward Park in Winchester and as a cadet on H.M.S. Britannia, joining the Royal Navy in 1901 and served for seventeen years. His first posting as a naval cadet was in January 1903 to the battleship HMS Goliath, serving on the China Station. During World War I, he was in command of the destroyer HMS Bullfinch (1898) until October 1915, then served aboard the battleship HMS Commonwealth. For a short period (August to December 1917), he was assigned to the Operations and later, Plans Division of the Admiralty War Staff. He left for an appointment in the Mediterranean which enabled him to see the latest developments of war on seaborne commerce at close quarters. He returned to the Grand Fleet in time to be present at the final surrender of German sea power. He retired from the Navy in 1920 after entering Parliament.

That Kenworthy stayed [at the Naval Staff] for only five months was probably the result of factors beyond the need to employ invalid staff. A reading of his service record and his memoirs suggest that he was a man who was neither easy to work with nor necessarily very competent. His memoirs are particularly unreliable. Of the 244 executive officers for whom it has been possible to find their Sub-Lieutenant examination results, twenty-three failed an exam (9 per cent), and Kenworthy was one of these. From his service record it is possible to see that: in 1907 he was refused permission to qualify for a navigation course; in 1911 he failed the signals course for command of a Torpedo boat; in 1912 HMS Bullfinch, of which he was in command, struck HMS Leopard, and Kenworthy was 'cautioned to be more careful'; in 1915 he was sacked from HMS Bullfinch 'on account of unsatisfactory conduct'. The Admiral Commanding Orkneys and Shetlands concluded that Kenworthy was 'not a fit person to be in command of a destroyer'. It should be added in mitigation that collision between ships was not that uncommon. In any case, it is not any of these events that is telling, but the combination. Kenworthy's memoirs make no reference to his departure from HMS Bullfinch. He merely wrote that when he left the ship the crew cheered. His entry in the new Dictionary of National Biography has also failed to address these inconsistencies.

— Nicholas Black, The British Naval Staff in the First World War, p. 34

== Politician ==
Kenworthy first tried to enter Parliament at the 1918 general election contesting Rotherham as a Liberal but finished in third place. He was soon given another chance though when he was selected to contest Central Hull at a by-election in 1919. Anti-Coalition government sentiment was riding high and he was duly elected Member of Parliament for the Liberals. Kenworthy was one of the more energetic supporters of H. H. Asquith in Parliament and never lost his hostility to Lloyd George. During the 1924-29 parliament which was dominated by a Conservative majority, he worked closely with a group of radical Liberal MPs that included: William Wedgwood Benn, Percy Harris, Frank Briant and Horace Crawfurd to provide opposition to the government. When Lloyd George became Leader of the Liberal Party in 1926, despite the party taking on a more radical hue, Kenworthy resigned from the party and joined Labour. He also resigned his seat in the House of Commons and fought and won a by-election in Central Hull, standing for Labour. He retained the seat until 1931.

He was an active supporter of the movement for the independence of India. In 1934, he succeeded his father as Lord Strabolgi and was the opposition chief whip in the House of Lords from 1938 to 1942. He was disappointed not to be given a position in the postwar Labour government (1945–51).

== Personal life ==
Lord Strabolgi married twice. Firstly, in 1913, he married Doris Whitley, daughter of his fellow Liberal MP, Frederick Whitley-Thomson. They had four children, and divorced in 1941. Later that year, he married Geraldine Francis.

When he died in 1953 aged 67, he was succeeded by his eldest son, David Montague de Burgh Kenworthy, 11th Baron Strabolgi, another left-wing politician and member of the Labour Party.

== Writer ==
During World War II, he wrote numerous articles on the war, especially the war at sea. These include Secret Weapons in Modern World (27 April 1940) and What's Wrong with the British Army? in Colliers magazine (22 August 1942).

=== Books by Lord Strabolgi ===
His books include –

- Peace or war? (with a foreword by H. G. Wells, Boni & Liveright, New York, 1927)
- India, A Warning (E. Mathews & Marrot, London, 1931)
- The Campaign in the Low Countries: the first full-length account of the epic struggle in Holland and Belgium (London 1940)
- The Battle of the River Plate (Hutchinson & Co., London, 1940)
- Freedom of the Seas (jointly with Sir George Young)
- Our Daily Pay: the Economics of Plenty
- Sailors, Statesmen and Others: an Autobiography
- The Real Navy
- Narvik and After
- From Gibraltar to Suez: a study of the Italian Campaign
- Singapore and After
- Sea Power in the Second World War

== Appointments ==
- Chairman of the English-Speaking Union
- Vice-president of The Air League of The British Empire

== Sources ==
- Obituary in The Hindu – 10 October 1953
- Speech at the Empire Club of Canada, 1947
- Black, Nicholas (2009). The British Naval Staff in the First World War. Woodbridge: Boydell Press. ISBN 9781843834427.

Entry by Eric J Grove in Oxford Dictionary of National Biography, OUP 2004–08

Parliament of the United Kingdom
Preceded by Mark Sykes	Member of Parliament for Kingston upon Hull Central; 1919 – 1931	Succeeded by Basil Kelsey Barton
Peerage of England
Preceded by Cuthbert Matthias Kenworthy	Baron Strabolgi; 1934–1953	Succeeded by David Montague de Burgh Kenworthy
