= 1911 Kingston upon Hull Central by-election =

UK parliamentary by-election

The 1911 Kingston upon Hull Central by-election was a Parliamentary by-election held on 5 July 1911. It returned one Member of Parliament (MP) to the House of Commons of the Parliament of the United Kingdom, elected by the first past the post voting system.

== Vacancy ==
Seymour King the Conservative MP since 1885 was unseated on petition on 1 June 1911.

== Electoral history ==
December 1910 general election: Kingston upon Hull Central
| Party | Candidate | Votes | % | ±% |
|---|---|---|---|---|
| Conservative | Seymour King | 3,625 | 51.5 | +1.4 |
| Liberal | Robert Aske | 3,418 | 48.5 | −1.4 |
| Majority | | 207 | 3.0 | +2.8 |
| Turnout | | 7,043 | 86.1 | −1.8 |
| Conservative hold | | Swing | +2.4 | |

== The Candidates ==
- Mark Sykes was chosen as the new Conservative candidate to defend the seat. He had contested unsuccessfully, the Buckrose seat in Yorkshire at both 1910 general elections.
- The Liberals re-selected Robert Aske, their candidate here from the last election.

== The result ==
The seat was held for the Conservative Party by Mark Sykes.

1911 Kingston upon Hull Central by-election
| Party | Candidate | Votes | % | ±% |
|---|---|---|---|---|
| Conservative | Mark Sykes | 3,823 | 51.9 | +0.4 |
| Liberal | Robert Aske | 3,545 | 48.1 | −0.4 |
| Majority | | 278 | 3.8 | +0.8 |
| Turnout | | 7,368 | 84.6 | −1.5 |
| Conservative hold | | Swing | +0.4 | |

== Aftermath ==
A general election was due to take place by the end of 1915. By the autumn of 1914, the following candidates had been adopted to contest that election. Due to the outbreak of war, the election never took place.

- Unionist Party:Mark Sykes
- Liberal Party:

1918 general election: Kingston upon Hull Central
| Party | Candidate | Votes | % | ±% |
|---|---|---|---|---|
| Unionist | *Mark Sykes | 13,805 | 80.1 | +28.2 |
| Liberal | Roderick Kedward | 3,434 | 19.9 | −28.2 |
| Majority | | 10,371 | 60.2 | +56.4 |
| Turnout | | 17,239 | 54.9 | −29.7 |
| Unionist hold | | Swing | | |

- Sykes was the endorsed candidate of the Coalition Government.
