= Aske baronets =

Baronetcy in the Baronetage of the United Kingdom

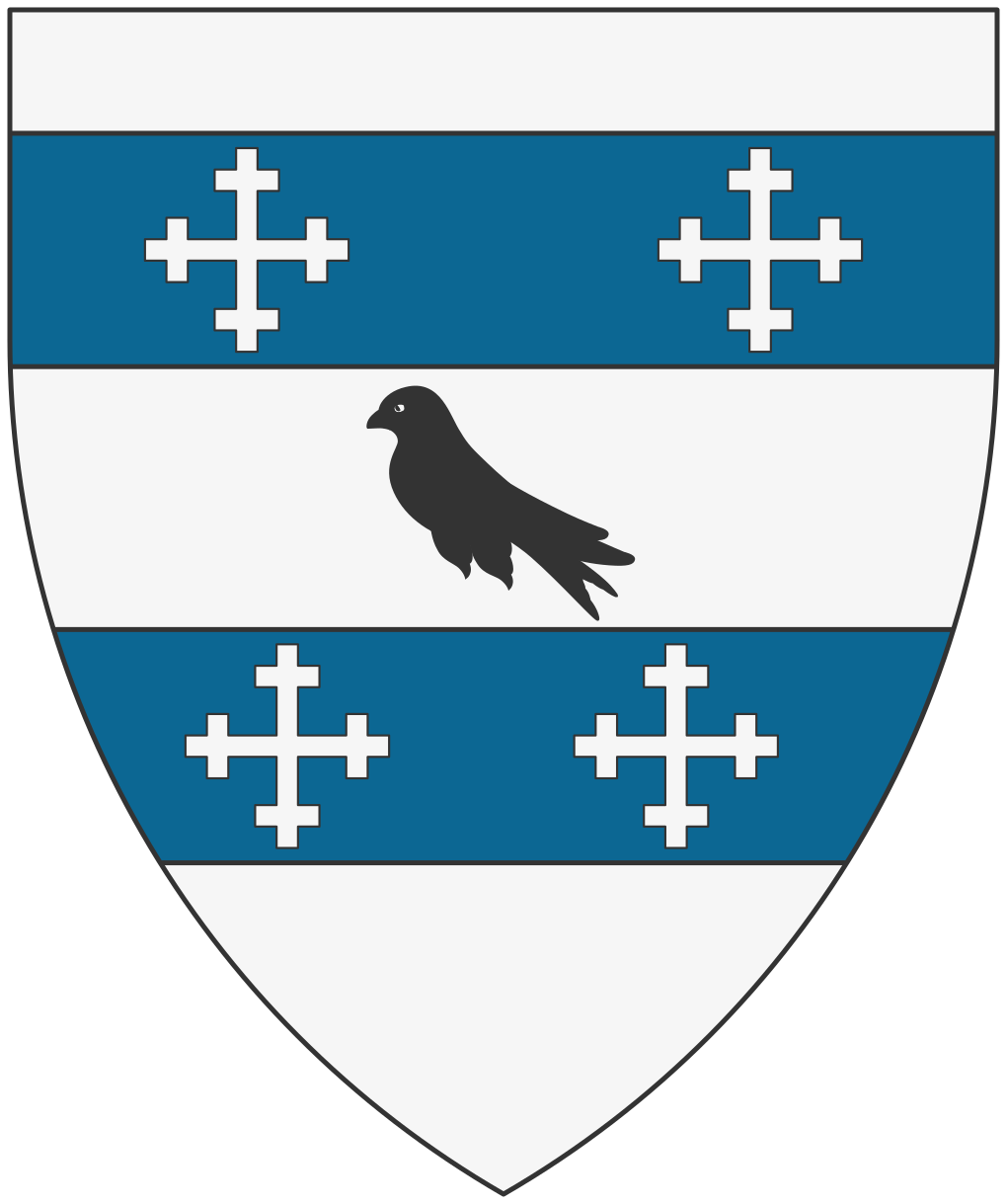
Arms of Aske of Aughton: Argent, a martlet sable between to bars azure, each charged with as many cross-crosslets of the first.

The Aske Baronetcy, of Aughton in the East Riding of the County of York, is a title in the Baronetage of the United Kingdom. It was created on 21 January 1922 for the barrister and liberal politician Sir Robert Aske.

== Aske baronets, of Aughton (1922) ==
- Sir Robert William Aske, 1st Baronet (1872–1954)
- Sir Conan Aske, 2nd Baronet (1912–2001)
- Sir Robert John Bingham Aske, 3rd Baronet (born 1941)

There is no heir to the baronetcy.
