= Robert Aske (merchant) =

Merchant & haberdasher (1619–1689)

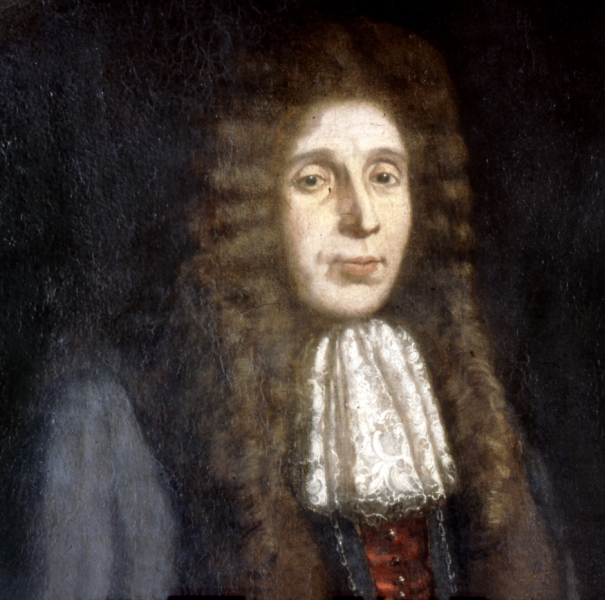
- Alderman Robert Aske
- Born: Robert Aske; 24 February 1619
- Died: 27 January 1689 (aged 69); London, England
- Occupation: Silk merchant
- Title: Master Haberdasher
- Relatives: Aske baronets

Robert Aske (24 February 1619 – 27 January 1689) was a 17th-century English philanthropist, merchant and haberdasher, who served as an Alderman of London.

Aske is remembered primarily for the charitable foundation he endowed nowadays operating two leading schools at Elstree, Haberdashers' Boys' School and Haberdashers' School for Girls and the non-fee paying Haberdashers' Aske's Hatcham School at New Cross, as well as others in the London area.

== Life ==
Originally from Aughton in Yorkshire, his father Robert Aske became an affluent City draper seated at Lewisham in Kent who apprenticed him to John Trott MP (1573–1642), Master Haberdasher (raw silk dealer) and East India Company merchant. Admitted as a Freeman of the Haberdashers' Company in 1643, Aske was elected Alderman of Bread Street Ward in the City of London in 1666, later serving as Master Haberdasher for 1685/86.

=== Royal African Company ===
From 1671 Aske held £500 of original stock in the slave-trading Royal African Company, where he was one of 198 stockholders, entitling him to a single vote. Elected Master of the Worshipful Company of Haberdashers, he was removed from office by James II in 1687 when the Catholic King lost faith in Aske, a Protestant.

Diversifying his wealth, Aske made an investment of £500 (c£. 100K as of 2025) in the Royal African Company (RAC) in 1672; this was made under the provisions of the original RAC charter of 1672 which stipulated that individual investors were entitled to one vote for each £100 share. To be elected an Assistant of the RAC, a shareholder had to hold at least £400 of shares, a regulation requiring those who wished to be entitled to vote as showing some financial commitment. Aske may have voted and participated in discussion about policy decisions, but there is no evidence that he became an Assistant of the Royal African Company. At the time of his death, Aske's estate included £650 (c£. 143K as of 2025) of RAC stock, representing just 1.3% of the total value of his estate.

During the 21st century many long-established European organizations have reviewed their historical legacy with respect to the transatlantic slave trade, as part of a global campaign, including the governing body of the Haberdashers' Boys' and Haberdashers' Girls' schools. This review of the perceived connections with Aske and the slave trade resulted in his name being dropped from the two Haberdashers' Schools at Elstree in 2021 and the Haberdashers' Hatcham College in South London, although it has been retained by the governing body.

=== Charity ===
Robert Aske's Charity Act 1690
- Act of Parliament
- Parliament of England
- Long title: An Act for settling a charity given by Robert Aske Esq. to the Company of Haberdashers of London.
- Citation: 2 Will. & Mar. Sess. 2. c. 18 Pr.
- Territorial extent: England and Wales

Dates
- Royal assent: 20 December 1690
- Commencement: 2 October 1690 (Note: Start of session.)

Other legislation
- Amended by: Haberdashers' Aske's Charity Act 2016

Status: Amended

Haberdashers' Aske's Charity Act 2016 (Note: Section 1(1).)
- Act of Parliament
- Parliament of the United Kingdom
- Long title: An Act to make provision regarding the identity of the corporators of the Aske Corporation and the status of the Corporation; to provide for property held on trust by the Corporation to be subject to the same legal controls as apply generally to charity property; to make formal provision for internal procedures; and for related purposes.
- Citation: 2016 c. ii
- Territorial extent: United Kingdom

Dates
- Royal assent: 15 September 2016
- Commencement: 15 September 2016 (Note: Section 4(b) of the Interpretation Act 1978.)

Other legislation
- Amends: Robert Aske's Charity Act 1690

Status: Current legislation

Text of statute as originally enacted

Revised text of statute as amended

Text of the Haberdashers' Aske's Charity Act 2016 as in force today (including any amendments) within the United Kingdom, from legislation.gov.uk.

Despite marrying twice, Aske left no children and bequeathed the bulk of his sizeable estate for charitable purposes, £32,000 (equivalent to £7m as of 2025), to the Haberdashers' Company which launched his career. Instructing £20,000 to be used to buy land within one mile of the City upon which was to be built a "hospital" (almshouses) for 20 poor members of the Worshipful Company of Haberdashers and a school for 20 sons of poor Freemen of the company, the remaining £12,000 established the Haberdashers' Aske's Foundation, of which the Haberdashers' Company remains a trustee, a charity incorporated by a private act of Parliament, Robert Aske's Charity Act 1690 (2 Will. & Mar. Sess. 2. c. 18 Pr.). The land bought at Hoxton was previously owned by Sir Thomas Seymour, an Aske family relative.

== Legacy ==
Almshouses and a school, Haberdashers' Aske's Boys' School, were built on 21 acres in Hoxton by 1692 to the design of Robert Hooke. A further 1,500 acres (6 km^{2}) in Kent were acquired to provide an annual income of over £700. The buildings were demolished in 1824 and reconstructed in 1825 to a design by the architect, David Riddell Roper. The almshouses were closed to enable the school to expand in 1874 to take 300 boys and 300 girls, and a second and third school were opened at Hatcham, Surrey, in 1875. Haberdashers' Aske's School, Hoxton was relocated (to Hampstead for the boys and Acton for the girls) in 1898. Whilst the Haberdashers' Company retained the parish advowson, the boys' school moved to Elstree, opening there in 1961, and both schools were reunited in 1974 when the girls' school opened on an adjoining site. The Hatcham schools are now merged as a single state school, an academy known as Haberdashers' Hatcham College.

== See also ==
- Haberdashers' Company
