= Hiscox (surname) =

Hiscox is a surname. Notable people with the surname include:

- Gertrude Hiscox (1910-1966), British collaborator
- Heather Hiscox (born 1965), Canadian news anchor
- Jack Hiscox (born 1995), Australian rules footballer
- Ralph Hiscox (1907–1970), British businessman
- Robert Hiscox (born 1943), British businessman
