= East London =

Northeastern part of London, England

Coordinates: 51°33′N 0°06′E

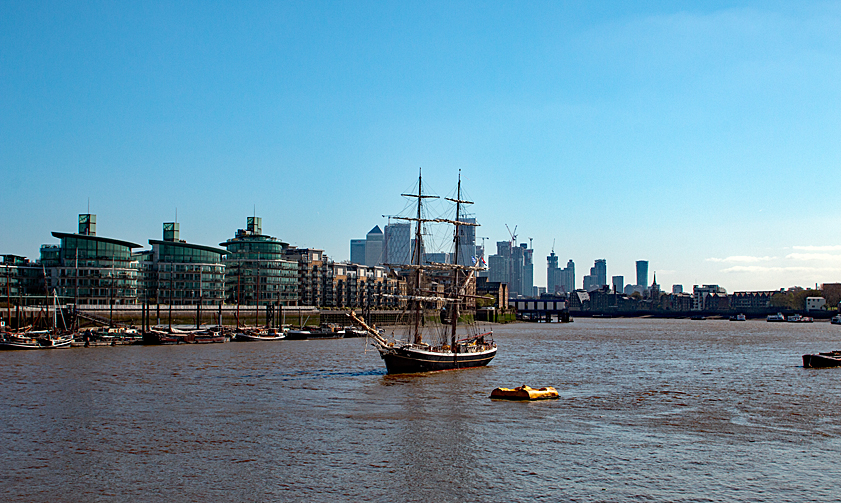
The former docklands, with Wapping in the foreground and the skyscrapers of the Isle of Dogs behind.

East London is the part of London, England, east of the ancient City of London and north of the River Thames as it begins to widen. East London developed as London's docklands and the primary industrial centre. The expansion of railways in the 19th century encouraged the eastward expansion of the East End of London and a proliferation of new suburbs. The industrial lands of East London are today an area of regeneration, which are well advanced in places such as Canary Wharf and ongoing elsewhere.

== History ==
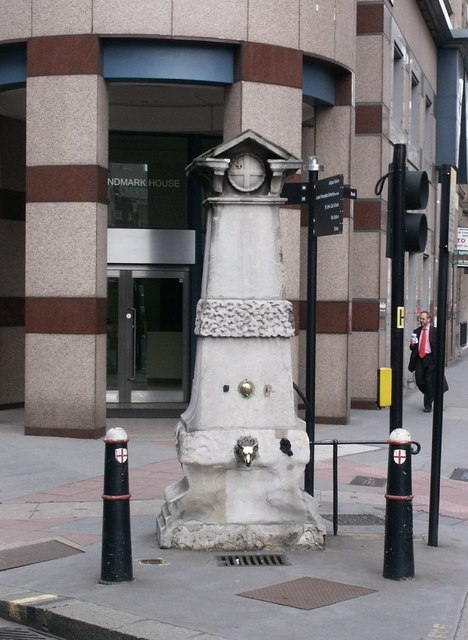
The Aldgate Pump is the symbolic start of the East End and East London as a whole

=== Emergence and growth ===
The East End of London, the old core of modern East London, began with the medieval growth of London beyond the city walls, along the Roman roads leading from Bishopsgate and Aldgate, and also along the river. The initially modest eastern extensions were separated from the northern and western suburbs by the marshy open area of Moorfields adjacent to the wall on the north side, which discouraged development in that direction. Building accelerated in the late 16th century, and the area that would later become known as the East End began to take shape.

In 1720 John Strype described London as consisting of four main parts; The City of London, Westminster, Southwark and That Part Beyond the Tower. This was the first time that East London was explicitly recognised as one of the capital's major quarters.

The relevance of Strype's reference to the Tower of London was more than geographical. The East End was the urbanised part of an administrative area called the Tower Division (also known as the Tower Hamlets), which had owed military service to the Constable of the Tower (in his ex-officio role as Lord Lieutenant of the Tower Hamlets) from an unknown point in the medieval period, having its roots in the Bishop of London's historic Manor of Stepney. This made the Constable a prominent figure in the civil and military affairs of the East End.

Growth was stimulated by the maritime trades (such as shipbuilding and dockyards) along the River Thames, with weaving a major employer inland, and many factories sprung up on either bank of the River Lea. These factories accelerated the growth of new suburbs beginning in West Ham, that lay east of Bow Bridge, and the Lea, in Essex. This growth was given further impetus by the opening of the Royal Victoria Dock in 1855.

=== Administration ===
The growth of population in the parishes to the east of the City of London led to a need to break up the ancient parish of Stepney into smaller units to provide adequate religious and civil administration. The existing administrative framework was supplemented by the Metropolitan Board of Works between 1856 and 1889. This covered much of the capital but excluded the area east of the Lea.

The Tower Division continued to operate as a county and hundred until replaced by the new Metropolitan Boroughs of Stepney, Shoreditch, Hackney, Poplar and Bethnal Green, in the new County of London, in local government re-organisations of 1890 and 1900. These boroughs would be replaced by larger new London Boroughs in 1965.

=== Railway led expansion ===
The majority of the rail network in East London was built within fifty years from 1839. The first through the area was the Eastern Counties Railway from Mile End to Romford, extended to Shoreditch in 1840. The London and Blackwall Railway built a line from Minories to Blackwall the same year and the Northern and Eastern Railway connected Lea Bridge and Tottenham with the Eastern Counties at Stratford. The Eastern Counties and Thames Junction Railway started passenger service on their line from Stratford to Canning Town, Custom House and North Woolwich in 1847. This made Stratford a significant railway junction and location of railway works. The East and West India Docks and Birmingham Junction Railway connected Kingsland with Bow and Poplar in 1850 and was renamed North London Railway in 1853.

In 1854 the London, Tilbury and Southend Railway connected Forest Gate on the Eastern Counties with Barking and Rainham. The East London Railway was opened in 1869. The Great Eastern Railway connected Lea Bridge with Walthamstow in 1870, and in 1872 built a connection from the Eastern Counties line at Bethnal Green to Hackney Downs. This was connected to the Walthamstow line in 1873 and extended to Chingford. The London and Blackwall built an extension to Millwall and North Greenwich on the Isle of Dogs in 1872 and the Eastern Counties and Thames Junction Railway was extended to Beckton in 1873, and Gallions in 1880. The London, Tilbury and Southend Railway connected Barking with Dagenham, Hornchurch and Upminster in 1885, and Romford with Upminster in 1893. The final piece of original railway works was the construction of the Great Eastern loop line to connect Woodford with Ilford via Fairlop in 1903.

=== Later expansion ===
Areas further east developed in the Victorian and Edwardian eras after the expansion of the railways in the 19th century. Development of suburban houses for private sale was later matched by the provision of large-scale social housing at Becontree in the 1920s and Harold Hill after the Second World War. However, the urban footprint was constrained in 1878 by the protection of Epping Forest and later the implementation of the Metropolitan Green Belt. The density of development increased during the interwar period, and new industries developed, such as Ford at Dagenham.

=== Industrial decline and regeneration ===
The industries declined in the later part of the 20th century (and earlier), but East London is now an area of regeneration. London Docklands was defined in the 1980s as the area of redevelopment under the control of the London Docklands Development Corporation. The Thames Gateway extends into East London with two areas of activity: the Lower Lea Valley around the Olympic site and London Riverside adjacent to the Thames.

== Terms and scope ==
From the late 19th century the term East End of London came into widespread use, describing areas of East London closer to the City of London.

By 1882, Walter Besant, and others, were able to describe East London as a city in its own right, on account of its large size and social disengagement from the rest of London (Besant would also say the same of South London). In 1902 he would describe East London as an area north of the Thames and east of the City of London stretching as far as Chingford and Epping Forest.

Charles Booth in 1889 defined East London as the County of London between the City of London and the River Lea. The scope of Booth's work only included the parts of the capital that had been included in the new County of London and therefore excluded parts of London in Essex. In 1902 Booth would describe the areas of East London west of the Lea as the "true East End".

In 1950 Robert Sinclair described East London as stretching east to include the more newly developed areas of Barking and Dagenham. This broadly matched the Metropolitan Police District east of the city and north of the Thames at that time, and now corresponds to the boroughs of Barking and Dagenham, Hackney, Havering, Newham, Redbridge, Tower Hamlets and Waltham Forest in Greater London.

The part of East London east of the Lea was known as "London-over-the-Border" from 1857 and later as "Metropolitan Essex".

== Governance ==
There are seven London boroughs that cover areas of Greater London to the north of the Thames and east of the City of London. They are Barking and Dagenham, Hackney, Havering, Newham, Redbridge, Tower Hamlets and Waltham Forest. Each London borough is governed by a London borough council local authority. Barking and Dagenham, Hackney, Havering, Newham and Redbridge are members of the East London Waste Authority. Some local government functions are held by the Greater London Authority, made up of the Mayor of London and the London Assembly.

| Borough | Barking and Dagenham | Hackney | Havering | Newham | Redbridge | Tower Hamlets | Waltham Forest |
|---|---|---|---|---|---|---|---|
| Location | | | | | | | |
| Local authority | Barking and Dagenham LBC | Hackney LBC | Havering LBC | Newham LBC | Redbridge LBC | Tower Hamlets LBC | Waltham Forest LBC |
| London Assembly constituency | City and East | North East | Havering and Redbridge | City and East | Havering and Redbridge | City and East | North East |
| Inner/Outer London | Outer | Inner | Outer | Outer (Note: Inner London for statistics) | Outer | Inner | Outer |
| Major centres (Note: Metropolitan and major centres in the London Plan) | Barking | Dalston | Romford | Stratford, East Ham | Ilford | Canary Wharf | Walthamstow |

== Geography ==
East London is located in the lower Thames valley. The major rivers of East London are the Thames that forms the southern boundary; the Lea which forms the boundary of Tower Hamlets/Hackney with Newham/Waltham Forest; the Roding which approximately forms the boundary of Newham with Barking and Dagenham/Redbridge; and the Beam which forms the boundary of Barking and Dagenham with Havering. The marshes along the Thames which once stretched from Wapping to Rainham are almost completely gone. East London is generally the lowest elevated of London's four cardinal points because of the wide Thames that runs here; the only hills here are in northern areas distant from the river in the boroughs of Havering, Redbridge and Waltham Forest.

== Demography ==
In what is now Tower Hamlets, the population peaked in 1891 and growth was restricted to the outer boroughs. By 1971 the population was declining in every borough. By the 2011 United Kingdom census, this had reversed and every borough had undergone some growth in population. At the 2021 census Barking and Dagenham, Havering and Redbridge surpassed their earlier population peaks. The total population of this area in 2021 was 1.9 million people. The population change between 1801 and 2021 was as follows:

| Borough | Barking and Dagenham | Hackney | Havering | Newham | Redbridge | Tower Hamlets | Waltham Forest |
|---|---|---|---|---|---|---|---|
| Population (2021) | 218,869 | 259,146 | 262,052 | 351,036 | 310,260 | 310,306 | 278,425 |
| Population (2001) | 165,700 | 207,200 | 224,700 | 249,500 | 241,900 | 201,100 | 222,000 |
| Population (1901) | 25,080 | 374,132 | 24,853 | 338,506 | 77,621 | 578,143 | 154,146 |
| Population (1801) | 1,937 | 14,609 | 6,370 | 8,875 | 4,909 | 130,871 | 6,500 |
| Population at peak | 218,869 | 379,120 | 262,052 | 454,096 | 310,260 | 584,936 | 280,094 |
| Population at peak | (2021) | (1911) | (2021) | (1931) | (2021) | (1891) | (1931) |

== Transport ==
=== River crossings ===
The City of London and West London are connected to South London by more than thirty bridges, but East London is only connected by Tower Bridge at its innermost edge. The reasons for this include the widening of the River Thames as it gets further east, and also the need, until relatively recently, to avoid impediments to the river traffic of the strategic London Docklands.

Until the end of the 20th century the East was connected to the South by just one railway line, the East London Line, now part of the London Overground. The Jubilee Line Extension opened in 1999, was supplemented by an extension to the Docklands Light Railway in 2009, and introduction of the Elizabeth line in 2022.

There are road tunnels at Rotherhithe, Blackwall, and Silvertown, with the Woolwich Ferry further east. There are foot tunnels to Greenwich and Woolwich. In 1870, the Tower Subway cable railway tunnel was converted to pedestrian use; it was closed in 1898, following the opening of Tower Bridge.

A cable car service, between Greenwich Peninsula and Royal Victoria Dock, opened in 2012.
