= 1900 London local elections =

Local elections in England

- 1 November 1900

All 1,362 councillors in all 28 metropolitan boroughs
	First party	Second party
Party	Moderate	Progressive
Councils	20	6
Councillors	812	463

Local elections were held in London on 1 November 1900.

== Electoral arrangements ==
The County of London, outside of the City of London, was divided into 28 metropolitan boroughs. Each borough was divided into a number of multi-member electoral wards.

Councillors were elected to serve a three-year term, to go out of office in 1903. Polling took place on 1 November 1900.

== Results ==
The Conservative-aligned Moderates won control of the majority of boroughs. The Liberal-aligned Progressives took control of Battersea, Bethnal Green, Camberwell, Fulham, Shoreditch and Southwark councils.

The results for each borough were as follows:

Borough	New control	Moderate (Note: Includes all Conservative Party-aligned candidates who stood as Moderate or another name.)	Progressive	Others	Total	Details
Battersea	Progressive	17	37		54	
Bermondsey	Moderate	27	25	2 (Note: 2 Independent)	54	
Bethnal Green	Progressive	8	22		30	Details
Camberwell	Progressive	24	31	5 (Note: 4 Independent, 1 Independent Progressive)	60	
Chelsea	Moderate	23	13		36	
Deptford	Moderate	20	16		36	
Finsbury	Moderate	29	12	13 (Note: 6 Independent, 5 Independent Progressive, 2 Independent Labour Party)	54	
Fulham	Progressive	14	21	1 (Note: 1 Independent)	36	
Greenwich	Moderate	19	11		30	
Hackney	Moderate	37	20	3 (Note: 3 Independent)	60	
Hammersmith	Moderate	26	8	2 (Note: 2 Independent)	36	
Hampstead	Moderate	24	15	3 (Note: 3 Independent)	42	
Holborn	Moderate	39	2	1 (Note: 3 Independent Progressive)	42	
Islington	Moderate	47	10	3 (Note: 3 Independent)	60	
Kensington	Moderate	48	10	2 (Note: 1 Independent, 1 Ratepayers Association)	60	
Lambeth	Moderate	35	25		60	
Lewisham	Moderate	35	7		42	
Paddington	Moderate	47	10	3 (Note: 3 Independent Moderate)	60	
Poplar	No overall control	20	19	3 (Note: 2 Independent Progressive, 1 Independent Moderate)	42	
Shoreditch	Progressive	13	28	1 (Note: 3 Independent Progressive)	42	
Southwark	Progressive	15	44	1 (Note: 1 Independent)	60	
Stepney	Moderate	32	23	5 (Note: 4 Independent, 1 Independent Progressive)	60	
St Marylebone	Moderate	44	12	4 (Note: 3 Non Political Union, 1 Independent Progressive)	60	
Stoke Newington	Independent			30 (Note: 30 Independent)	30	
St Pancras	Moderate	38	22		60	
Wandsworth	Moderate	57	2	1 (Note: Independent Moderate)	60	
Westminster	Moderate	50	8	2 (Note: 2 Independent)	60	
Woolwich	Moderate	24	10	2 (Note: 1 Independent, 1 Independent Progressive)	36	
Total		812	463	87	1,362	
