= 1928 Bethnal Green Borough election =

Local election in England

Elections to Bethnal Green Council were held on 1 November 1928. All the council seats were up for election. The term of office for each Councillor being three years.

== Background ==
Following the decision of the Labour Party to expel Communist Party members from their party, in Bethnal Green, a number of their council group were expelled, including leading figure Cllr. Joseph James Vaughan. The Communist Party responded by fielding a full slate of candidates in opposition to Labour Party candidates. Bethnal Green Liberals decided to end their nominal Progressive alliance with the Municipal Reform Party and stand candidates for the first time under the Liberal Party label.

== Summary ==
In the previous elections in 1925, the Labour Party had won 17 of the 30 council seats, giving it a majority of Councillors. In 1928 the Liberal Party swept the board winning all 30 council seats.

Bethnal Green Borough Election Result 1928
Party	Seats	Gains	Losses	Net gain/loss	Seats %	Votes %	Votes	+/−
Liberal	30	18	0	+18	100.0	52.4	8,059	
Labour	0	0	14	-14	0.0	30.9	4,750	
Communist	0	0	3	-3	0.0	9.4	1,441	
Municipal Reform	0	0	1	-1	0.0	7.4	1,137	

- Changes in seats from dissolution

== Election result ==
* - Councillor seeking re-election

Comparisons are made with the 1925 election results.

=== East ===
No. 2 East
Party	Candidate	Votes	%	±%
Liberal	Garnham Edmonds *	3,777	53.4	+4.9
Liberal	Charles Bennett *	3,664		
Liberal	Wesley Clark Chandler *	3,580		
Liberal	Arthur Charles Rawles	3,530		
Liberal	A T J Brooks	3,484		
Liberal	John Robert Davy	3,454		
Liberal	Alice Eleanor Davy	3,431		
Liberal	J Clark	3,424		
Liberal	Rowland Larkins	3,403		
Labour	C Adams	2,180	30.8	−13.0
Labour	H E Adams *	2,176		
Labour	C Agombar	2,160		
Labour	J J W Bradley *	2,157		
Labour	Thomas Joseph Boyce	2,144		
Labour	A Bean	2,086		
Labour	F Jeffcote	2,035		
Labour	C Hoskins	1,972		
Labour	H Wilson	1,934		
Municipal Reform	William Shadforth *	680	9.6	
Municipal Reform	F Allen	583		
Municipal Reform	S Broadway	537		
Municipal Reform	J Dunn	502		
Municipal Reform	M Cunnington	476		
Municipal Reform	W Wells	464		
Municipal Reform	F Read	443		
Communist	G Buckmaster *	437	6.2	
Municipal Reform	M Sutherland	430		
Municipal Reform	B Treadgold	416		
Communist	M Elsbury	376		
Communist	J Clements	324		
Communist	M Greenberg	306		
Communist	I Goldman	295		
Communist	C White	292		
Communist	J Fedor	291		
Communist	B Tobin	291		
Communist	M Green	286		

Liberal gain 2 from Labour and 1 from Municipal Reform

=== North ===
No. 1 North
Party	Candidate	Votes	%	±%
Liberal	Richard Edward Pearson	1,704	56.0	+22.2
Liberal	H A Bacon	1,698		
Liberal	Stanley Brown	1,674		
Liberal	C Calnan	1,658		
Liberal	Kate Eleanor Rawles	1,629		
Liberal	R Cohen	1,563		
Labour	Daniel George Alabaster *	1,153	37.9	−13.5
Labour	A G Clark *	1,121		
Labour	Charles William Hovell	1,095		
Labour	J Ough	1,093		
Labour	A Jenkins	1,085		
Labour	L Goldstein *	1,076		
Communist	G Buckmaster *	184		
Communist	H Buck	164		
Communist	R Wren	135		
Communist	M McAllister	132		
Communist	J King	126		
Communist	E Lonsinger	101		

- Liberal gain 5 from Labour and 1 from Communist

=== South ===
No. 3 South
Party	Candidate	Votes	%	±%
Liberal	Michael Richard Seymour	1,464	46.0	+2.1
Liberal	William Groome	1,404		
Liberal	Mary Eleanor Elizabeth James	1,397		
Liberal	Sydney Lancaster Sarel	1,324		
Liberal	H J Ranson	1,296		
Liberal	William H Jones	1,279		
Liberal	L Haltrecht	1,223		
Liberal	Alfred W Holloway	1,213		
Liberal	William Charles McBeth	1,188		
Labour	W H Bryant	908	28.6	−16.7
Labour	Charles William Hovell	878		
Labour	R Field	876		
Labour	J Hercock	872		
Labour	Allan Edward McAuliffe	860		
Labour	F Wilson	830		
Labour	G Prosser	825		
Labour	J Taylor	806		
Labour	H Smith	803		
Communist	Sam Elsbury *	522	16.4	
Communist	Rebecca Elsbury *	513		
Communist	J King	464		
Communist	H Buck	423		
Communist	I Greenberg	414		
Communist	J Clements	408		
Communist	S Lyons	401		
Communist	R Wren	398		
Communist	S Lazarus	386		
Municipal Reform	F Barns	288	9.1	
Municipal Reform	R George	272		
Municipal Reform	W Doidge	264		
Municipal Reform	F Webb	260		

Liberal gain 3 from Labour and 3 from Communist

=== West ===
No. 4 West
Party	Candidate	Votes	%	±%
Liberal	J Harris	1,114	53.3	−7.5
Liberal	Tom Brooks *	1,107		
Liberal	Lydia Dorothea Benoly *	1,105		
Liberal	George Bayley *	1,033		
Liberal	Albert J Sharman	1,002		
Liberal	Tom Peter Spring	912		
Labour	W Bailey	509	24.4	−14.8
Labour	Daniel George Alabaster *	481		
Labour	J Robinson	411		
Labour	H Peaston	380		
Labour	G Hunt	360		
Labour	S Tate	358		
Communist	Sam Elsbury *	298	14.3	
Communist	E Applebaum	285		
Communist	S Bergman	241		
Communist	A Cohen	239		
Communist	J Cohen	222		
Communist	I Sulkin	207		
Municipal Reform	J Wilson	169	8.1	
Municipal Reform	E Watts	161		
Municipal Reform	F Gottlieb	157		
Municipal Reform	M Kornfield	153		

Liberal hold 6

Preceded by 1925 Bethnal Green Borough election	Bethnal Green local elections	Succeeded by 1931 Bethnal Green Borough election
