= 1903 Bethnal Green Borough Council election =

1903 English local government election

1903 Bethnal Green Metropolitan Borough Council election
- 2 November 1903

All 30 councillors on Bethnal Green Metropolitan Borough Council
	First party	Second party
Party	Progressive	Moderate
Seats won	28	2
Seat change	▲6	▼6

The second election to Bethnal Green Metropolitan Borough Council took place on 2 November 1903.

== Electoral arrangements ==
The County of London, outside of the City of London, was divided into 28 metropolitan boroughs. One of these, the Metropolitan Borough of Bethnal Green, was divided into four wards, each electing either 6 or 9 councillors, to give a total of 30 councillors on Bethnal Green Metropolitan Borough Council. Councillors were elected for a three year term, to go out of office in 1906. Polling took place on 2 November 1903.

== Results ==
=== General elections of councillors ===
The Moderates lost six seats to the Progressives, including that of James Walker who was mayor for 1902/3.

1903 Bethnal Green Metropolitan Borough Council election
Party	Seats	Gains	Losses	Net gain/loss	Seats %	Votes %	Votes	+/−
Progressive	28	6		▲6				
Moderate	2		6	▼6				

=== Aldermanic election ===
In addition to the 30 elected councillors, there were 5 aldermen on the council. The aldermanic election took place at the first meeting of the council on 9 November 1903. 3 aldermen were elected for a term of 6 years, to go out of office in 1909. After the election, all 5 aldermen on the council were Progressives.

Party	Alderman	Votes
Progressive	W. Belsham (Note: Replaced by Joe Norris in February 1905.)	27
Progressive	J. Merrison	27
Progressive	J. Roberts	27

== Ward results ==
The results for each ward were as follows:

=== Ward No. 1: North ===
Ward No. 1: North (6)
Party	Candidate	Votes	%	±%
Progressive	A. Barnard	990	60.1	
Progressive	T. Goodwin	924		
Progressive	J. Nolan	848		
Progressive	Joe Norris	847		
Progressive	F. Read	832		
Progressive	J. Pearl	787		
Moderate	J. Mowatt	657	39.9	
Moderate	T. Ball	598		
Moderate	G. Giles	551		
Moderate	S. Montague	495		
Moderate	J. Madgley	476		
Moderate	M. Nathan	376		
Turnout				
Progressive hold		Swing		
Progressive hold		Swing		
Progressive hold		Swing		
Progressive hold		Swing		
Progressive hold		Swing		
Progressive hold		Swing		

=== Ward No. 2: East ===
Ward No. 2: East (9)
Party	Candidate	Votes	%	±%
Progressive	Garnham Edmonds	1,362	58.3	
Progressive	J. Hall	1,343		
Progressive	E. Hardy	1,303		
Progressive	J. Spurling	1,293		
Progressive	H. Coffin	1,267		
Progressive	William Rawles	1,224		
Progressive	A. Peers	1,187		
Progressive	R. Larkins	1,098		
Progressive	C. Hovell	1,070		
Moderate	James Walker	976	41.7	
Moderate	E. Luffingham	872		
Moderate	B. McCrea	820		
Moderate	B. Morley	743		
Moderate	F. Allard	740		
Moderate	W. Restall	679		
Moderate	G. Vaughan	537		
Moderate	A. Cohen	434		
Moderate	S. Nathan	370		
Turnout				
Progressive hold		Swing		
Progressive gain from Moderate		Swing		
Progressive hold		Swing		
Progressive hold		Swing		
Progressive hold		Swing		
Progressive hold		Swing		
Progressive hold		Swing		
Progressive hold		Swing		
Progressive gain from Moderate		Swing		

=== Ward No. 3: South ===
Ward No. 3: South (9)
Party	Candidate	Votes	%	±%
Progressive	William Lewis	1,127	63.2	
Progressive	J. Neate	1,053		
Progressive	J. Ellis	1,050		
Progressive	H. Jones	1,018		
Progressive	F. Felton	1,000		
Progressive	J. Hobney	980		
Progressive	W. Sweetman	962		
Progressive	T. Salmon	945		
Progressive	C Wood	933		
Independent	P. Burton	655	36.8	
Independent	B. Fountain	613		
Independent	H. Ranson	609		
Independent	C. Benham	592		
Turnout				
Progressive hold		Swing		
Progressive hold		Swing		
Progressive hold		Swing		
Progressive hold		Swing		
Progressive hold		Swing		
Progressive hold		Swing		
Progressive hold		Swing		
Progressive hold		Swing		
Progressive hold		Swing		

=== Ward No. 4: West ===
Ward No. 4: West (6)
Party	Candidate	Votes	%	±%
Progressive	T. Brooks	880	38.3	
Progressive	H. Bristow	786		
Progressive	J. Davey	786		
Moderate	J. Catherall	735	32.0	
Progressive	J. Ward	733		
Moderate	J. Fleming	724		
Progressive	E. Roberts	716		
Progressive	J. Cohen	699		
Ind. Moderate	F. Rogers	684	29.8	
Ind. Moderate	Thomas Francis	681		
Ind. Moderate	J. Richardson	679		
Ind. Moderate	C. Tagg	622		
Turnout				
Progressive gain from Moderate		Swing		
Progressive gain from Moderate		Swing		
Progressive gain from Moderate		Swing		
Moderate hold		Swing		
Progressive gain from Moderate		Swing		
Moderate hold		Swing		
