= Walter Windsor =

British politician (1884–1945)

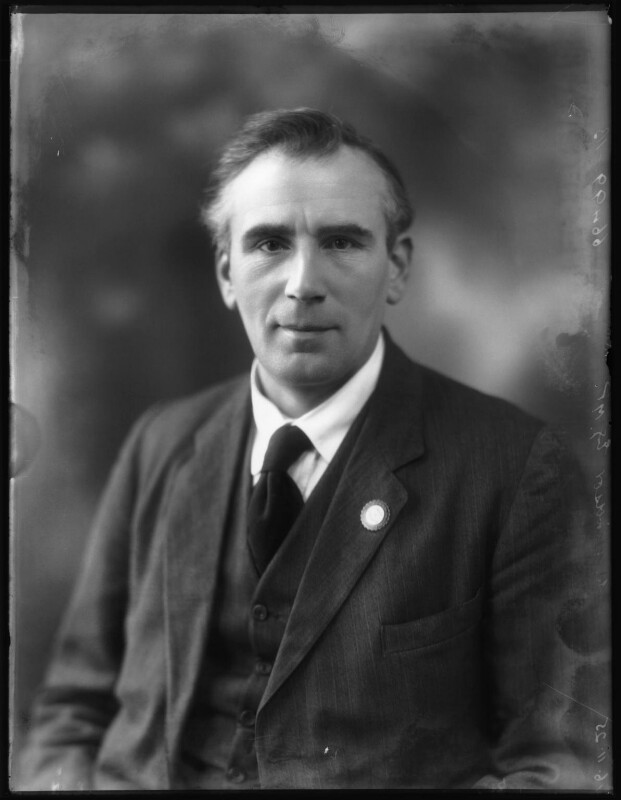
Windsor in 1925

Walter Windsor (18 July 1884 – 29 June 1945) was a British Labour Party politician. A native of Bethnal Green in the East End of London, he held a seat in the House of Commons from 1923 to 1929, and from 1935 to 1945, when he died.

== Bethnal Green ==
Windsor was elected at the 1923 general election as the Member of Parliament (MP) for Bethnal Green North East, an area where his family had lived for six generations. Through the 1920s it was a marginal seat between the Liberal Party and Labour Parties, and Windsor won it narrowly at two elections, holding the seat from 1923 to 1929.

He had contested the seat unsuccessfully in 1922 as a "Labour" candidate, even though he had been nominated by the Communist Party, and had not received the endorsement of the Labour Party. He was beaten in 1922 by the Liberal Garnham Edmonds, a former Mayor of Bethnal Green, who had won the seat in a 4-way contest with a majority of only 115 (0.8%) votes over Windsor. However, in a three-way contest in 1923 Windsor was an official Labour candidate and took the seat with a majority of 625 votes (3.9%).

The Conservative Party candidate Robert Tasker had fought an unconventional campaign, proclaiming that he was "without any organisation or the usual machinery", and won only 12.5% of the votes.

On 15 January 1924, as peers and MPs assembled for the State Opening of Parliament, Windsor and fellow MPs Clement Attlee and John Scurr joined a demonstration outside Temple Gardens on the Victoria Embankment which had been organised by the National Unemployed Workers' Movement. Windsor marched with a contingent of workers from Bethnal Green.

Defending the seat at the 1924 general election, Windsor was opposed only by Edmonds, who hoped to win the support of the Conservative voters who had backed Tasker in 1923. However, on polling day the turnout increased from to 68% from 1923's 59%, and Windsor held the seat by a majority of 95 votes (0.4% of the total).

Windsor continued to press the case of the unemployed. In December 1927, he stressed the casual nature of much employment in Bethnal Green, where poor relief had risen from £752 in 1912 to £137,000 in 1926–27. To allocate work more fairly on a national basis, he suggested that men over 60 and under 14 should be taken out of work, in order to free up jobs for those with dependants.

=== Defeat ===
Unemployment remained a major issue in Bethnal Green at the 1929 general election, both workers and for rate-payers, who had seen high rates to pay for relief for those out of work, leading to closure of factories. The Conservative campaign of Captain Alan Bell focused on de-rating, and the Liberal candidate Major Harry Nathan stressed the employment-generating prospects of LLoyd George's plans to cut armaments and boost road-building. Bell and Nathan blamed each other for splitting the anti-Socialist vote, but when the votes were counted Bell's 7.7% was low enough to allow Nathan to take the seat from Windsor with a majority of 589 votes (2.5%).

== Nottingham ==
At the next general election, in October 1931, Windsor did not contest Bethnal Green. He stood instead in Nottingham East, a Liberal Conservative marginal seat where Labour had not even fielded a candidate for most of the 1920s. However, J.H. Baum had stood in 1929, coming a close third with 28% of the votes. In a bad year for Labour, Windsor won 15.4% of the votes, and the Conservative barrister Louis Gluckstein won the seat from the sitting Liberal MP Norman Birkett.

== Hull ==
After a six-year absence, Windsor was returned to the House of Commons at the 1935 general election, when he was elected as MP for Hull Central, defeating the sitting Conservative MP, Basil Barton.

In 1937 he introduced a private member's bill which would allow a court to make provisions out of the estate of a deceased person for the benefit of surviving spouse or child, to protect against widows and children being left destitute.

The Inheritance (Family Provision) Bill was founded on the report of a joint committee of the Lords and Commons, and was the third such bill to be introduced that decade: previous bills had failed in 1931 and again in 1934.

The bill was opposed by some Conservatives, but supported by several Conservative and Labour MPs, including Eleanor Rathbone who told the House that she did not know "any women's organisation that has not petitioned in favour of the Bill over and over again". It was granted a second reading on 22 January 1937, and after scrutiny by a standing committee, it failed to pass into law because not time was found for the report stage before the end of that session of Parliament.

In a heated debate on the adjournment in June 1937, William Wedgwood Benn complained that the bill was "to be defeated, not on its merits, but because the Government have seen fit to suppress the only chance which it has of being discussed in the House at all".

In August 1943 he pressed for an increased supply of utility furniture.

=== 1945 election ===
At the 1945 general election, Windsor had been nominated as the Labour candidate for Hull Central, and was conducting his election campaign from a hotel in Hull. He had been ill for a few weeks, and confined to bed, but had left his sick room to campaign, and on 29 June he was found dead on a chair in his hotel room by a maid.

His death, at the age of 60, meant that all nominations for Hull Central were treated as invalid. The poll was deferred, and was re-run on 19 July, two weeks after polling in most other constituencies, when the seat was held for Labour by Captain Mark Hewitson. The result was declared on 9 August; it was the last result to be declared in the general election.

Parliament of the United Kingdom
Preceded by Garnham Edmonds	Member of Parliament for Bethnal Green North East; 1923 – 1929	Succeeded by Harry Nathan
Preceded by Basil Barton	Member of Parliament for Hull Central; 1935 – 1945	Succeeded by Mark Hewitson
