= Hamish Mackie =

British wildlife sculptor (born 1973)

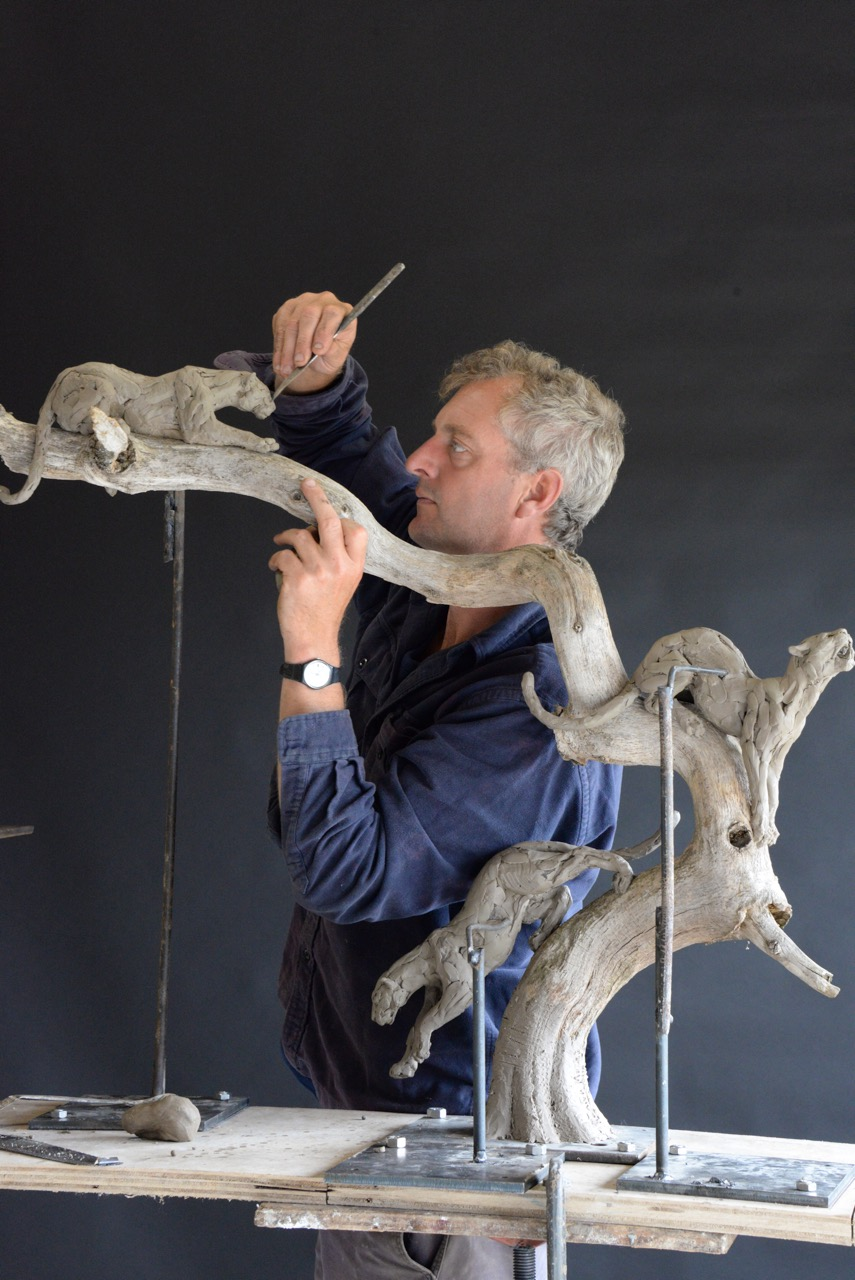
Hamish Mackie

Hamish Mackie (born October 1973) is a British wildlife sculptor who works in bronze, silver and any other castable metal using the lost-wax casting method. He is considered to be one of the world's foremost wildlife sculptors. Largely self-taught, Mackie captures his subjects - ranging from livestock to birds via wild animals - by observation in a natural environment, taking detailed photographs and sometimes modelling in plasticine. From this he creates a highly accurate anatomical core covered with a loose, almost impressionistic skin that captures the essence of the animal's personality. He has won numerous commissions including works for Jilly Cooper, Charles Saatchi, Ronnie Wood (private) and RSPCA, National Trust, Woburn Abbey, Merrill Lynch, Hiscox, and most recently the Berkeley Group Holdings (public). He has travelled to places including Antarctica, the Falkland Islands, Australia, across Africa, and the United Arab Emirates in search of subjects.

== Biography ==
=== Early life ===
Hamish Mackie was born in Reading, England in 1973. His father was in the British Army, so the family spent the first years of Mackie's life living in both Hong Kong and the UK, before settling permanently on a farm in Lostwithiel, Cornwall in 1978. From an early age Mackie was tasked with many farm duties, including looking after livestock.

=== Education ===
After prep school Mackie went to Radley College, where he found the support of its Art Department. Paul Kilsby, his sculpture teacher, acknowledged Mackie's strength in capturing the dynamic animal form. Mackie made his first sale during his A-level show: two clay lambs for £50 to a family friend.

The buyer took the lambs to Simon Allison at the Lockbund Sculpture Foundry to be cast in bronze, introducing him to one of the most important working relationships of his career. 'Simon called me up and asked me if I wanted to sign them. I drove up to meet him and see their lost-wax casting process.' This began a working relationship that has lasted to this day.

In 1992 Mackie did a foundation course at Falmouth University followed by, in 1993, a BA in Product and Furniture Design at Kingston University. He paid his way by selling his sculptures, for example Tregothnan Estates commissioned Mackie to sculpt a buzzard, followed by an otter for Trewithen Estates.

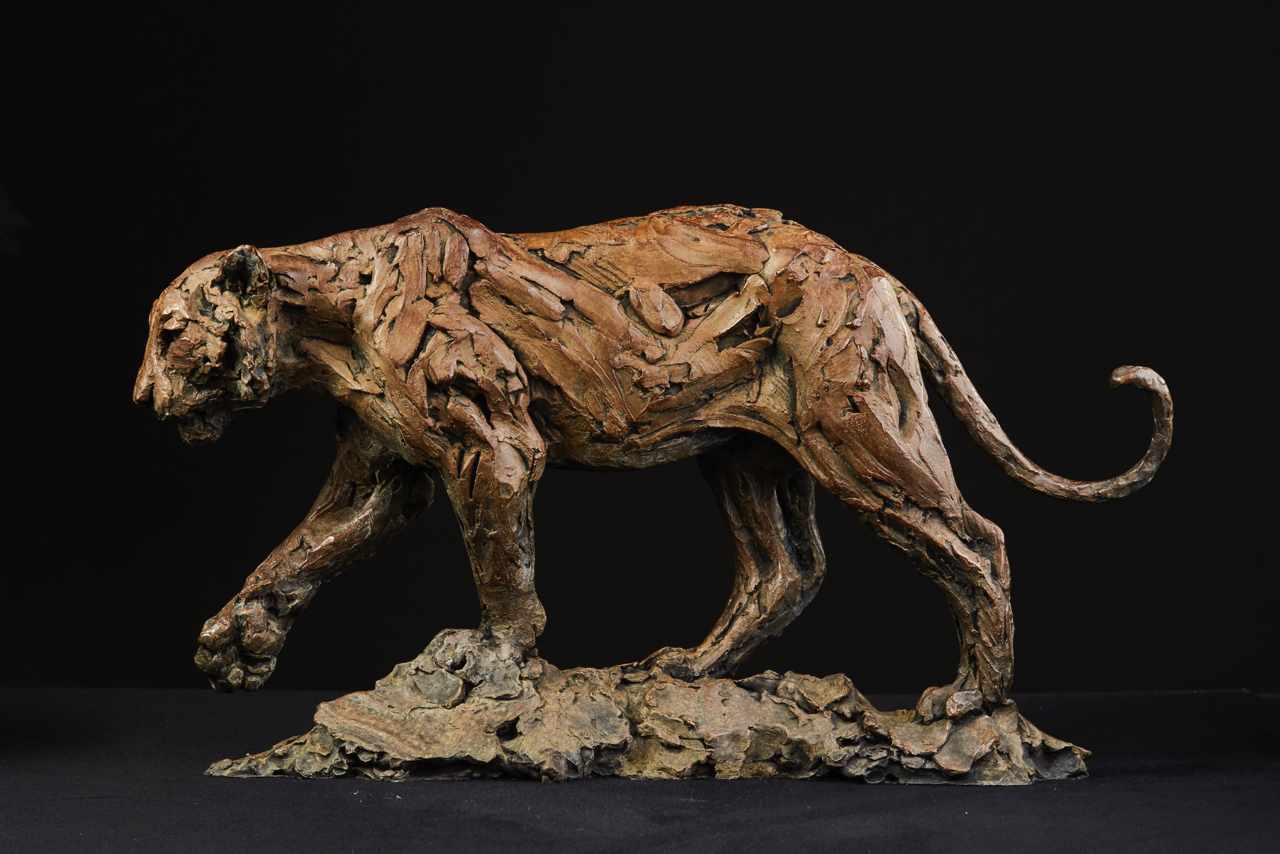
Tiger Walking

After university, Mackie travelled extensively in Africa, and in 1995 he took a job in a hunting camp in Zimbabwe. He observed how environment impacts character, particularly the distinction between a wild animal and one in captivity. His interest led him to the conservationist Ian Craig in Kenya, backed by TUSK, an organisation he still supports. Face to face with African wildlife, the urge to sculpt overcame him and he created a cheetah head out of beeswax and paraffin.

== Career ==
Mackie returned to the UK determined to sculpt full-time. He met with the renowned wildlife sculptor Mark Coreth, carrying his wax cheetah head under his arm. From there Mackie met with Simon Allison again to explore the prospect of casting his models in bronze for commercial sale. Allison was confident enough in Mackie's skills to defer payment until he started to sell. In 1996 Mackie moved closer to the foundry in Oxfordshire, and entered into the Art for Youth competition where he won the "Diana Brooks Prize". The following year

He was accepted into the Royal Academy's "Summer Exhibition", following on from his first solo show with Fanshawe Somerset, London. Several successful solo shows followed, and in 2010 his solo show, also at the Cork Street Gallery, outperformed most of the galleries at Frieze Art Fair that year.

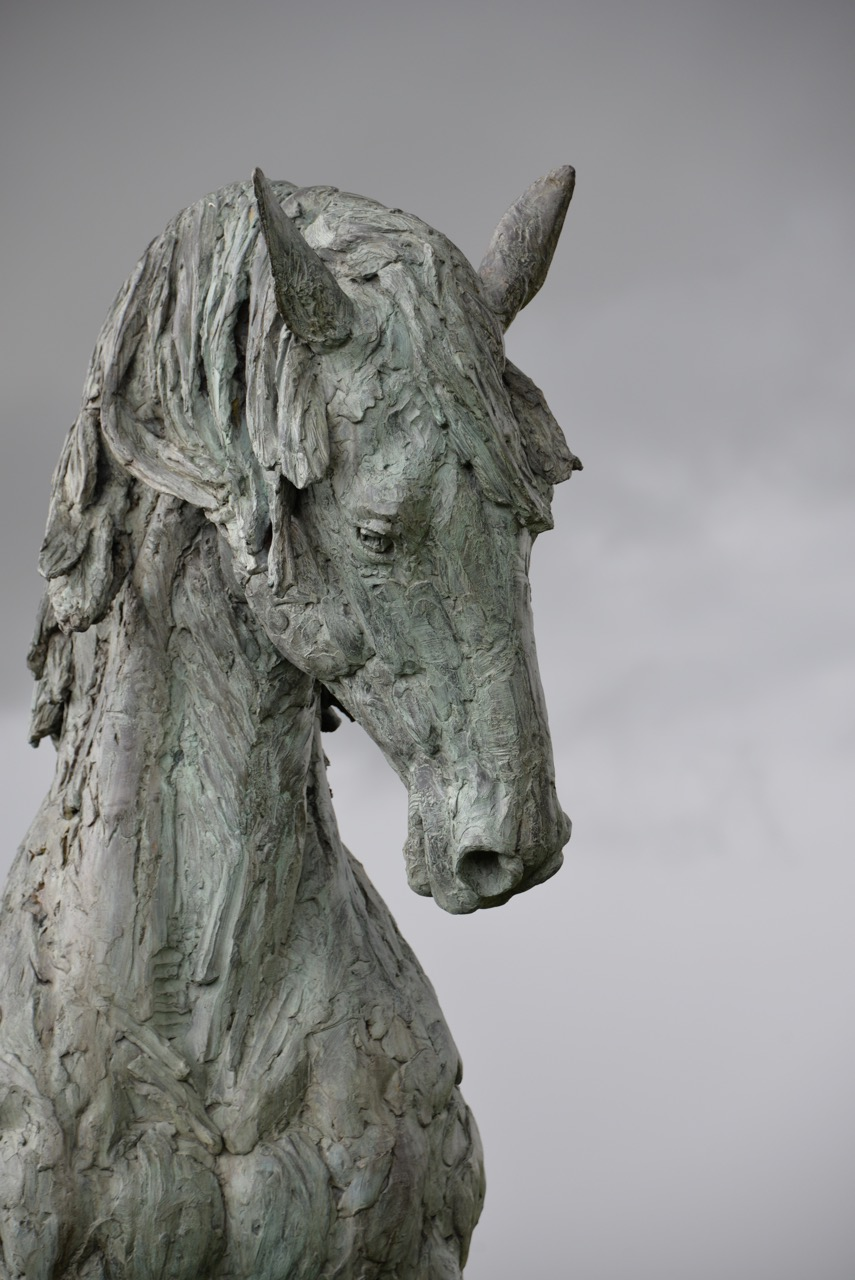
Andalusian stallion, Goodman's Fields, London

In 2013 Mackie landed his most important public commission to date: six life and a quarter-size horses designed to look as though they are galloping through the Berkeley Group Holdings development in Goodman's Fields, in the Whitechapel district of the London Borough of Tower Hamlets, in east London. The sculptures were revealed at the end of June 2015 and in 2016, Mackie was awarded the Public Monuments and Sculpture Association's (PMSA) annual Marsh Award for Excellence in Public Sculpture and Public Fountains.

Mackie's work was exhibited at the opening of the Clarendon Fine Art gallery in Hampstead, London alongside work from prominent contemporary artists, Todd White, Sherree Valentine-Daines and Christian Hook.

== Artistic style ==
Mackie's sculptures are distinctive for a highly accurate anatomical core covered by a loose, almost impressionistic skin. His works include a large range of animals. This loose style allows him to highlight the differences in, for instance muscle groups, hair texture and even capture character via a careful working of eyes, nose and other defining features. His sculpting style is underpinned by a striking sympathy with animal kind.

He has stated, "Having spent so much time studying wildlife in its natural environment, I've developed a true understanding of animal behaviour". Indeed, when in the field in places like Africa and Antarctica, as well as his camera, he will also take plasticine with him.

== Exhibitions ==
=== Past exhibitions ===
- 1996 Art for Youth – winner of the Diana Brookes Prize
- 1996 First Solo show, Air Gallery, Fanshawe Somerset, London
- 1997 Royal Academy Summer Exhibition, London
- 1998 Brewin Dolphin, CLA Game Fair
- 1999 Cotswold Wildlife Park in Aid of Tusk Trust, Oxfordshire
- 2000 Hiscox Insurance, London
- 2001 Art London
- 2002 Soane, London
- 2003 Rathbones, Edinburgh
- 2004 Second Solo Show, The Gallery, Cork Street
- 2005 Knight Frank, Inhomes, Hungerford
- 2006 Third Solo Show, Fine Art Commission, London
- 2008 Represented by Collier and Dobson
- 2010 Mallett, American International Fine Art Fair, The Palm Beach Jewellery, Art and Antique show, Florida
- 2010 and every year since, RHS Chelsea Flower Show, London
- 2012 Fourth Solo Show, Mallett, New York
- 2012 Olympics Public Art (Sculpture 2012), Grosvenor Square and Oxford Street, London
- 2013 and every year since, Mallett, the San Francisco Fall Antiques Fair
- 2013 Game and Wildlife Conservation Trust, Highgrove, Gloucestershire
- 2013 Fifth Solo Show, The Gallery, Cork Street
- 2016 Sixth Solo Show, 'Life in Bronze', Mall Galleries, London
- 2017 Muse Sculpture, Royal Ascot, Berkshire & Olympia, London
- 2017 Blenheim Palace, Oxfordshire, Mackie's Andalusian Stallion on public display
- 2017 Stowe School, Buckinghamshire, Mackie's Andalusian Stallion on public display
- 2017 Blenheim Horse Trials, Blenheim Palace, Oxfordshire, Mackie's Andalusian Stallion on public display
- 2017 Sculpt at Kew, Royal Botanic Gardens, Kew, London

== Selected commissions ==
- Merrill Lynch, London
- Hiscox, London
- Andrew Winch Design
- Countryside Alliance
- Lewa Downs, Kenya
- Chippenham Park, Cambridgeshire
- Knowsley Park, Derbyshire
- Tregothnan Estates, Cornwall
- Trewithen Estates, Cornwall
- Cadogan Estates
- Gilbane Development Company, Rhode Island
- Bahamas Development Company, Bahamas
- Alibaba Group, Hong Kong
- Purdey, London (Resident Sculptor)
- Clear Water, Nova Scotia, Canada
- Radley College
- National Trust
- Barclays Private Bank Ltd
- The Himalayan Garden, Yorkshire
- Floors Castle
- Chapman University, California
- Westminster Estates
- Woburn Abbey
- Sogo Hong Kong
- British Racing School

Major Public Commission: Six bronze horses, life and a quarter size, for Berkeley Homes' Goodman’s Fields development in London.

== Family ==
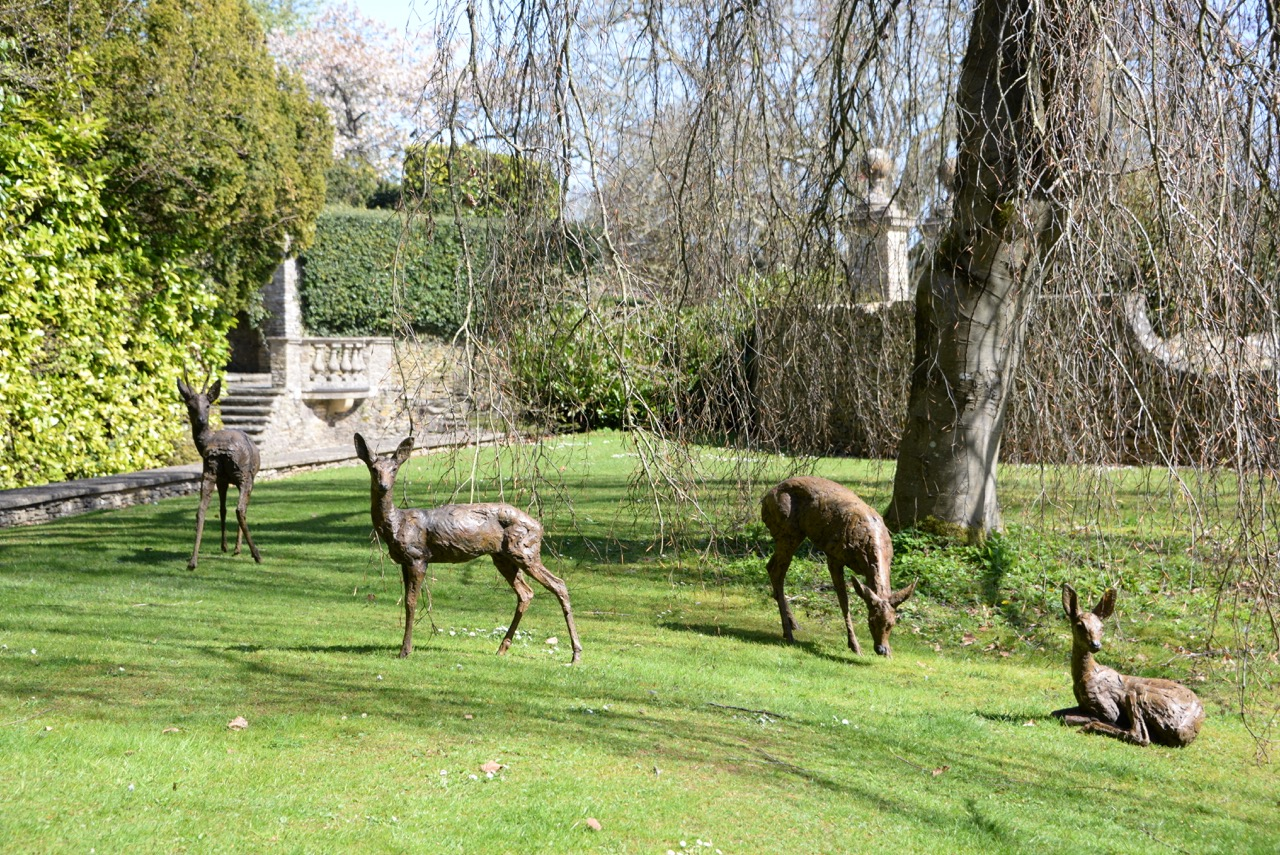
Roe Deer sculptures in a natural setting

Mackie is married with three daughters.
