= Mancherjee Bhownaggree =

British-Indian politician

Sir Mancherjee Bhownaggree KCIE
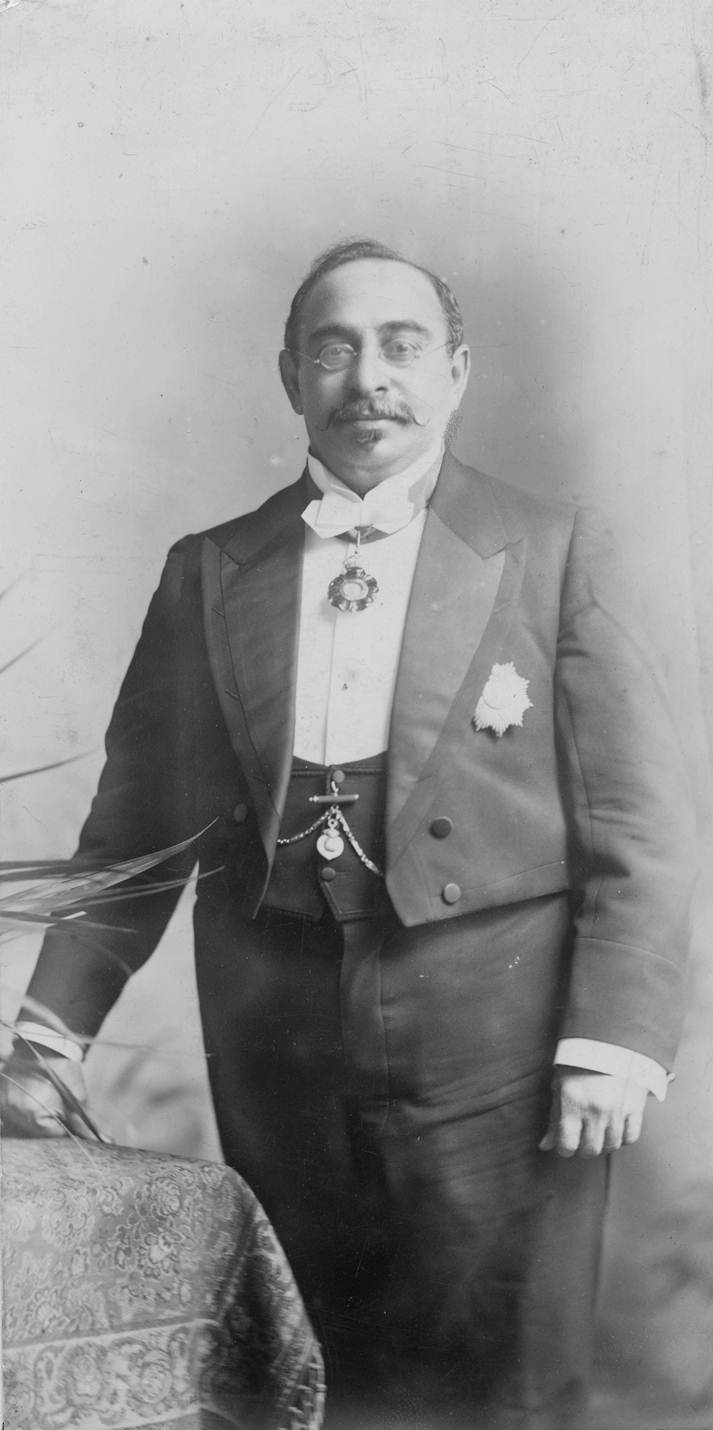
- Sir Mancherjee Bhownaggree

Member of Parliament for Bethnal Green North East
- In office 1895-1906

Personal details
- Born: 15 August 1851 Bombay, Bombay Presidency, British India
- Died: 14 November 1933 (aged 82) London, England, United Kingdom
- Party: Conservative
- Education: University of Bombay

Sir Mancherjee Merwanjee Bhownaggree KCIE (15 August 1851 – 14 November 1933) was a British Conservative Party politician of Indian Parsi heritage. He was a member of parliament (MP) representing the constituency of Bethnal Green North East in the Parliament of the United Kingdom between 1895 and 1906, the third British MP of Indian descent, after David Ochterlony Dyce Sombre, and fellow Parsi Dadabhai Naoroji. Bhownaggree was the longest-serving British Asian MP until Keith Vaz (who was first elected in 1987 and stood down in 2019).

== Biography ==
Bhownaggree was born the son of a merchant in Bombay, India, and was educated in Elphinstone College and the University of Bombay. He became a journalist after finishing his education. At 22, he was appointed, on the death of his father, to succeed to the Bombay agency of the Kathiawar state of Bhavanagar. Bhownaggree went to the United Kingdom in 1882. Called to the bar at Lincoln's Inn in 1885, in the following year the Maharaja appointed him judicial councillor, a post in which he introduced far-reaching reforms.

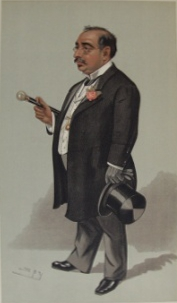
Vanity Fair caricature

Bhownaggree settled in the United Kingdom in 1891, becoming a lawyer. He was the head of the Parsi organisation in Europe and chairman of the Indian Social Club. He joined the Conservative Party and was selected as the party's candidate in the 1895 general election for Bethnal Green North East. His compatriot Dadabhai Naoroji was in the 1892-95 parliament before losing his seat; Bhownaggree was the only other Indian of that time to enter the House of Commons, and the only one to be re-elected (1900). He was made a Companion of the Most Eminent Order of the Indian Empire (CIE) in 1886, and was knighted as a Knight Commander of the Most Eminent Order of the Indian Empire (KCIE) upon the occasion of Queen Victoria's Diamond Jubilee in 1897.

During his ten years in parliament, Bhownaggree was a supporter of British rule in India and opposed the campaign for home rule. He originated and unflaggingly maintained in and out of the House the long battle against the disabilities of Indians in South Africa and other overseas dominions of the Crown. His cogent and detailed statement of the case for Indians in the Transvaal after annexation was the basis of a blue-book (Cd. 2239, 1904), and was sent to Lord Milner by the Colonial Secretary, Alfred Lyttelton, with the observation that he felt much sympathy for the views expressed, and that it would be difficult to give a fully satisfactory answer. The practical result was that the proposals of the High Commissioner were in some important particulars rejected. Bhownaggree was one of the first Indians to press forward the need for technical and vocational education in India side by side with literary instruction.

Matthew Stubbings contrasted his conservative philosophy on British rule and social reform in India with that of Naoroji, an MP for the Liberal Party and a member of the Indian National Congress:

Bhownaggree’s opposition to Indian nationalism and advocacy of social reform of local habit contributed to a conservative imperial ideology in British politics which argued that Naoroji and the Indian National Congress’s continuation of a liberal, civilising mission was a dangerous intrusion into India’s diverse society. Contrary to a transformative liberal imperialism informed by a western cultural hierarchy of race, conservatives argued that imperial good governance acknowledged and conciliated organic racial difference represented through a nation’s institutions, customs and habits... For Bhownaggree, a British Empire predicated on respecting locality and prescriptive right became the mechanism through which Bethnal Green’s and India’s diverse communities could enact historically specific social improvement while protecting local autonomy.

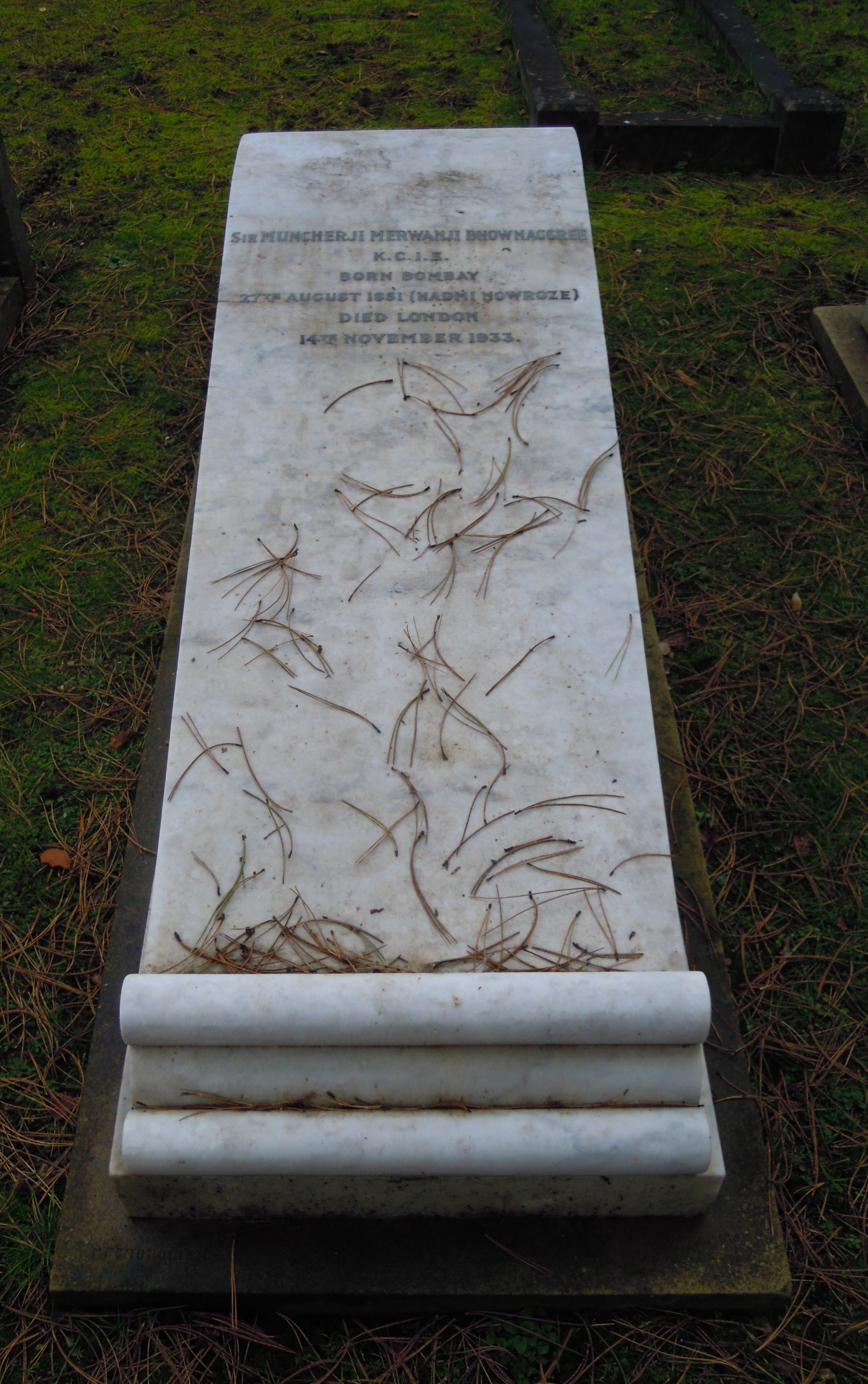
Grave of Mancherjee Bhownaggree in Brookwood Cemetery

After losing his seat in the 1906 general election he retired from politics. He was a generous donor, contributing to many charities in the memory of his deceased sister. He also contributed the Bhownaggree Gallery in the Commonwealth Institute.

He died aged 82 on 14 November 1933 in London and was buried in the Parsi Section of Brookwood Cemetery.

== Writings ==
In early life, he wrote a history of the constitution of the East India Company, and made a Gujarati translation of Queen Victoria's Life in the Highlands. During World War I, he assisted in repelling German propaganda regarding British rule in India by means of a widely circulated booklet entitled The Verdict of India.

== See also ==
- British Asians in politics of the United Kingdom
- Shapurji Saklatvala

Parliament of the United Kingdom
Preceded by George Howell	Member of Parliament for Bethnal Green North East; 1895–1906	Succeeded by Edwin Andrew Cornwall
