= Edwin Cornwall =

English politician and coal merchant (1863–1953)

The Right Honourable Sir Edwin Cornwall Bt DL
- Edwin Cornwall, c. 1900

Deputy Chairman of Ways and Means
- In office 28 February 1919 – 15 November 1922
- Speaker: James Lowther; John Henry Whitley
- Preceded by: Donald Maclean
- Succeeded by: Cyril Entwistle

Comptroller of the Household
- In office 14 December 1916 – 28 February 1919
- Prime Minister: David Lloyd George
- Preceded by: Charles Roberts
- Succeeded by: George Stanley

Member of Parliament for Bethnal Green North East
- In office 8 February 1906 – 15 November 1922
- Preceded by: Mancherjee Bhownagree
- Succeeded by: Garnham Edmonds

Personal details
- Born: Edwin Andrew Cornwall; 30 June 1863 Lapford, Devon, UK
- Died: 27 February 1953 (aged 89)
- Party: Liberal
- Other political affiliations: Coalition Liberal
- Spouse: Ellen Mary (m. 1883; died 1929)
- Children: Reginald Cornwall; Two daughters
- Parent: Andrew Cornwall (father)

Sir Edwin Andrew Cornwall, 1st Baronet, PC, DL (30 June 1863 – 27 February 1953) was an English politician and coal merchant.

== Early life and career ==
Cornwall was born in Lapford, Devon. At the age of thirteen he became a clerk in a coal merchant's in Hammersmith, London, and by seventeen was manager of the company's depot at Kensington. A few years later he set up his own business.

== Political career ==
In 1900 he became the first mayor of the new Metropolitan Borough of Fulham, having long served on the predecessor vestry. In 1892 he was elected to the London County Council, sitting for the Progressive Party, for which he was for eight years chief whip. In 1904 he was elected chairman of the LCC and as chairman of the Parliamentary Committee of the council led efforts to clear the slums between Holborn and the Strand on the site of which were built Aldwych and Kingsway.

Having unsuccessfully contested the Fulham constituency in 1895 and 1900, in 1906 Cornwall was elected to Parliament as a Liberal for Bethnal Green North East. He was appointed a deputy lieutenant of the County of London at the end of March 1906. From December 1916 to February 1919 he served as Minister of National Health Insurance and Comptroller of the Household and from 1918 to 1922 he was Deputy Chairman of Ways and Means and Deputy Speaker of the House of Commons. He was also vice-chairman of the County of London Territorial Force Association from 1908 to 1914 and a member of the Port of London Authority.

Cornwall was knighted in 1905, created a baronet in 1918, and appointed to the Privy Council in the 1921 Birthday Honours, entitling him to the style "The Right Honourable".

== Footnotes ==
Parliament of the United Kingdom
Preceded by Sir Mancherjee Bhownaggree	Member of Parliament for Bethnal Green North East; 1906–1922	Succeeded by Garnham Edmonds
Political offices
Preceded by John Benn	Chairman of the London County Council; 1905–1906	Succeeded by Evan Spicer
Preceded by Charles Roberts	Comptroller of the Household; 1916–1919	Succeeded by George Stanley
Baronetage of the United Kingdom
New creation	Baronet (of Holcombe Burnell); 1918–1953	Succeeded by Reginald Cornwall
