= Cornwall baronets =

Extinct baronetcy in the Baronetage of the United Kingdom

The Cornwall Baronetcy, of Holcombe Burnell in the County of Devon, was a title in the Baronetage of the United Kingdom. It was created on 22 June 1918 for the coal merchant and politician Sir Edwin Cornwall. The title became extinct on the death of the second Baronet in 1962.

== Cornwall baronets, of Holcombe Burnell (1918) ==
- Sir Edwin Andrew Cornwall, 1st Baronet (1863–1953)
- Sir Reginald Edwin Cornwall, 2nd Baronet (1887–1962)
