= Roojai Insurance =

Roojai Insurance PCL
- Type: Public limited company
- Industry: Insurance
- Founded: 2015
- Headquarters: Bangkok, Thailand
- Key people: Nicolas Faquet (Group CEO); Korakrit Khumruangrit (Chairman); Lhukchai Suttichujit (Director)
- Total assets: ▲TH฿ 1.4 billion (2024) ▲TH฿ 867 million (2023)
- Website: roojai.com/en/

Roojai Insurance Public Company Limited is an insurance company headquartered in Bangkok, Thailand. The company offers a range of non-life insurance, including motor and health insurance, and has expanded its operations to Indonesia.

== History ==
Roojai Insurance Public Company Limited began operations on 11 February 1948 under the name Maenam Warehouse Insurance Company Limited, providing general insurance services across various non-life segments. In 1994, following a change in major shareholding to Siam City Bank, the company was renamed Siam City Insurance Company Limited. A decade later, in 2004, the name was shortened to Siam City Insurance.

The company underwent a significant transformation in 2019 when it was acquired by FWD Group, a Hong Kong-based insurance and financial services provider. Post-acquisition, it was rebranded as FWD General Insurance Public Company Limited.

In 2022, Roojai Group, a Thai brokerage and insurtech founded in 2016 by Nicolas Faquet, acquired FWD General Insurance Public Company Limited from bolttech Group. Following the acquisition, the company was renamed to Roojai Insurance Public Company Limited, marking its transition into a licensed insurer under the Roojai brand. That same year, Roojai entered the Indonesian market by launching a fully digital car insurance service in partnership with Sompo Indonesia.

Roojai acquired DirectAsia Thailand from Hiscox Group in 2024. In the same year, Roojai acquired Lifepal, one of Indonesia's largest digital insurance marketplaces.

== Funding ==
Roojai completed a US$42 million Series B funding round in March 2023, led by HDI International, a subsidiary of Germany's Talanx Group, with participation from the International Finance Corporation (IFC) of the World Bank Group. In 2025, the company raised US$60 million through a joint investment by Apis Partners Group and Asia Partners.

== Sponsorship ==
Roojai Insurance is the main sponsor of the Roojai Insurance Cycling Team, which was founded in 2020. The team has participated in various competitions both in Thailand and abroad. Additionally, Roojai Insurance was an official main sponsor of the 2025 SEA Games and the 2025 ASEAN Para Games.
