= Hiscox =

Anglo-Bermudan insurance provider

Hiscox Limited
- Traded as: LSE: HSX; FTSE 100 component
- Industry: Insurance
- Founded: 1901
- Headquarters: Hamilton, Bermuda
- Key people: Robert Hiscox (Honorary President); Colin Keogh (Interim chairman); Aki Hussain (CEO)
- Products: Specialty property, casualty, kidnap and ransom, marine, aerospace, hacker, product recall and political risk insurance
- Revenue: ▲£4,883.7 million (2025)
- Operating income: ▲£799.5 million (2025)
- Net income: ▼£604.1 million (2025)
- Website: hiscoxgroup.com

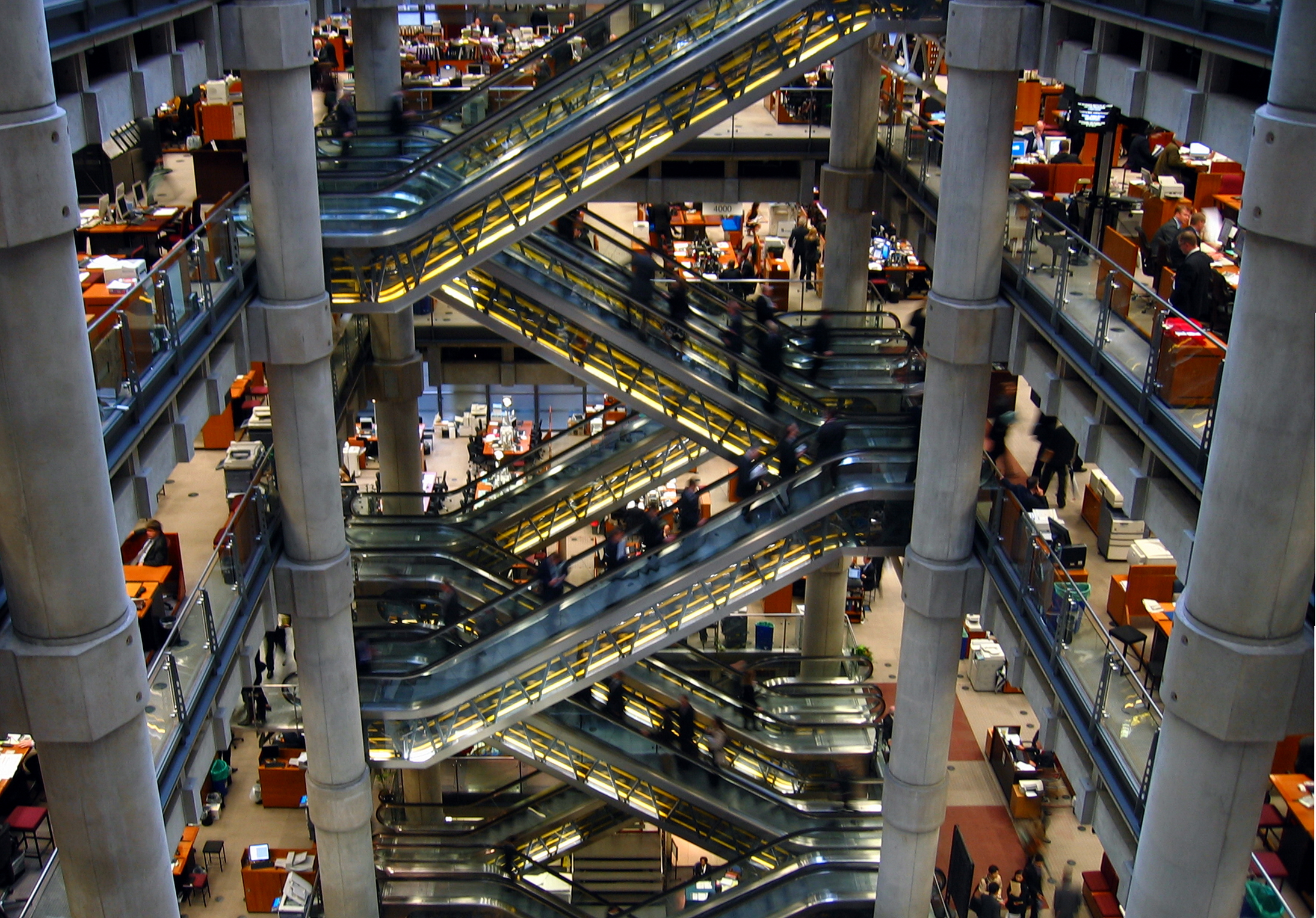
Hiscox is an underwriter at the Lloyd's of London insurance market.

Hiscox Ltd. is an Anglo-Bermudan insurance provider, listed on the London Stock Exchange. An underwriter at Lloyd's of London, the company largely specialises in niche areas of the market, offering property and casualty insurance aimed at companies and high-net-worth individuals, as well as cover against such risks as hacking, kidnapping and satellite damage. The company is listed on the London Stock Exchange and is a constituent of the FTSE 100 Index.

== History ==
The roots of the company lie with the Roberts agency, which commenced underwriting marine insurance at the Lloyd's market in 1901. In 1946 Ralph Hiscox, who had joined the agency as an underwriter of non-marine insurance eight years earlier, formed the Roberts & Hiscox partnership for the purposes of managing syndicates at Lloyd's. Hiscox was elected chairman of Lloyd's in 1967. In that same year, his son Robert joined the group's Syndicate 33 as an underwriter of fine art and personal accident insurance. Robert Hiscox subsequently took over as head of the partnership in 1970 on the death of his father, and set about growing the size of the business.

In 1987 the firm reorganised. A holding company, Hiscox Holdings Ltd, was established for the group, which comprised the subsidiaries Hiscox Syndicates (for managing syndicates) and Roberts & Hiscox (for introducing and advising members of the Lloyd's market). Expansion beyond the London market followed in 1989 with the formation of a third subsidiary, Hiscox Underwriting, specifically for this purpose. Roberts & Hiscox and related interests were demerged in 1994, leaving the company as merely an underwriter and manager of syndicates. Having previously listed on the Alternative Investment Market, Hiscox plc transferred to the main market of the London Stock Exchange in July 1997. Following the purchase of a 28% stake in the company by Chubb Corporation in 1998, the company fought to remain independent, successfully rebuffing two takeover offers by 2001. Chubb subsequently sold off its interest in Hiscox in 2004.

In 2005, the company opened a Bermuda office, writing a mix of worldwide reinsurance and retail business. The following year Hiscox plc moved its country of domicile from the United Kingdom to Bermuda, adopting the new name Hiscox Ltd. For 2009, the company increased its marketing budget from £400,000 to £10 million and launched a mass media campaign with the strap line "as good as our word".

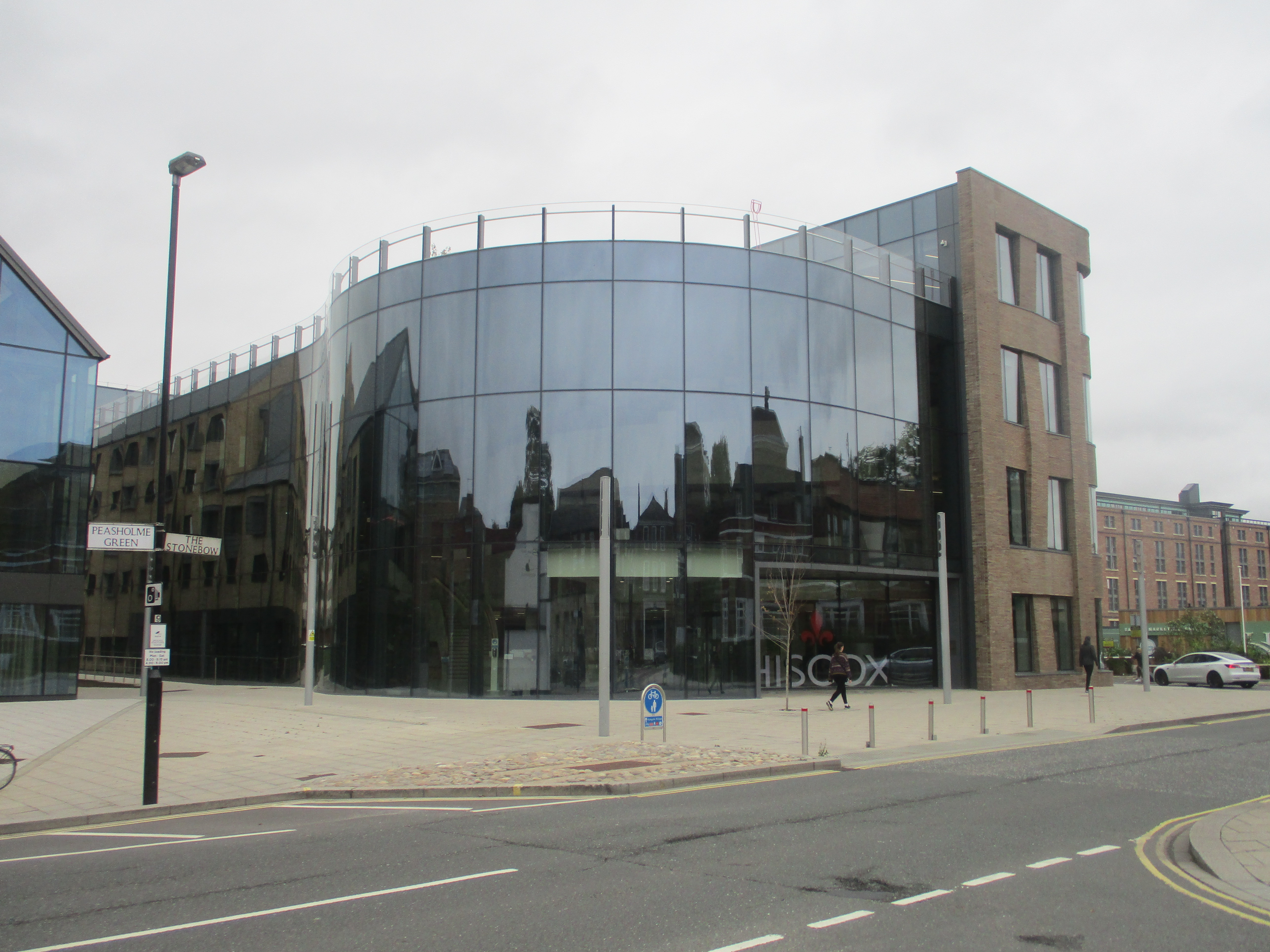
Hiscox offices in York.

In March 2014 Hiscox acquired direct-to-consumer online operation DirectAsia and in October 2014 Hiscox USA launched a new brand platform "Encourage Courage".

In 2020, Hiscox forecast its Covid-19 claims would reach $387m net of reinsurance. In January 2021 it added a further $48 million to its estimate for COVID-19 losses. This followed the UK Supreme Court’s ruling in favour of Hiscox customers who had challenged the company’s decision to exclude coronavirus-related disruptions from its business interruption policies. One of the judges, Lord Briggs said, commenting on the insurers' argument, "The cover apparently provided for business interruption caused by the effects of a national pandemic type of notifiable disease was in reality illusory, just when it might have been supposed to have been most needed by policyholders." "That outcome seemed to me to be clearly contrary to the spirit and intent of the relevant provisions of the policies in issue."

In August 2020 Hiscox’s Ben Walter maintained that its reputation was unaffected by its handling of business interruption claims from UK small businesses, but Chief Executive Bronek Masojada said in Hiscox’s 2020 preliminary results “Hiscox has undoubtedly suffered some brand damage this year.”.

The 2023 annual report of the firm stated that “The UK broker commercial business continued to enjoy excellent retention, illustrating the underlying quality of the business and the loyalty of our customers. However, new business growth was below Management expectation, particularly in the fourth quarter. This was primarily due to a delay in the activation of several broker distribution deals signed in the latter part of the year.”

Extinction Rebellion and other environmental campaign groups targeted Hiscox in March 2024.

== Products ==
The company sells both personal and commercial insurance cover in a range of areas: for individuals, Hiscox provides home and contents insurance for "higher value" houses, as well as classic car, fine art, bloodstock, kidnap and ransom and personal accident cover. For companies, coverage types include property, marine, aerospace, professional indemnity, hacker, product recall and political risk insurance as well as reinsurance.
