= Bethnal Green North East =

Parliamentary constituency in the United Kingdom, 1885–1950

- Former borough constituency for the House of Commons
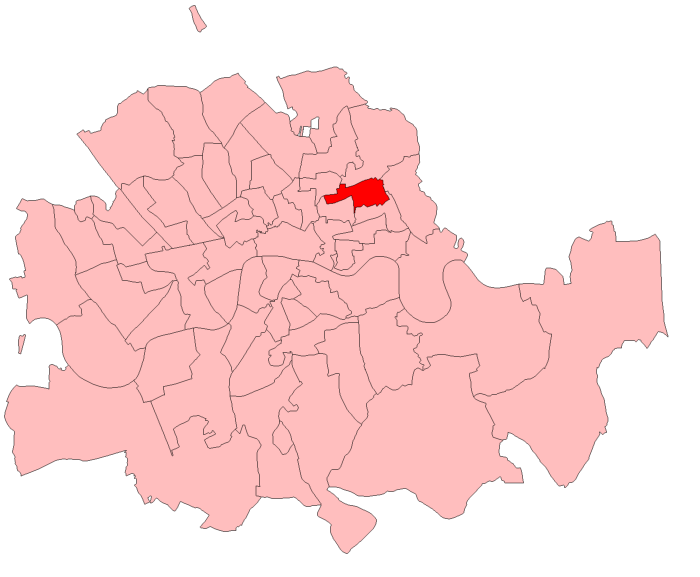
- Bethnal Green North East in London 1885–1918

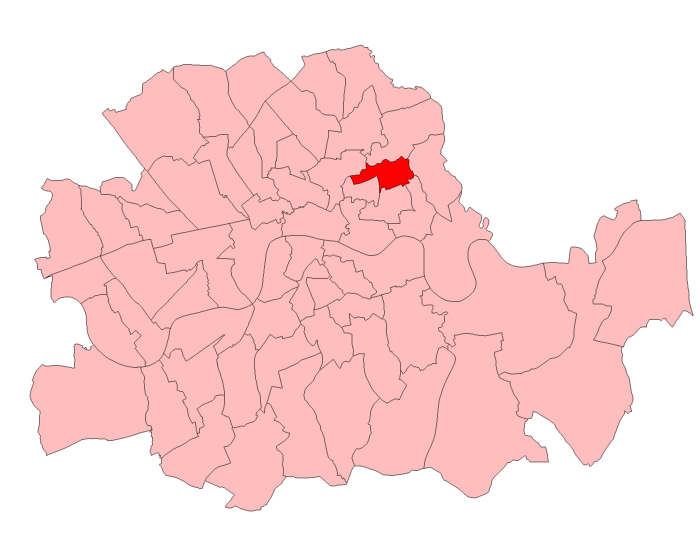
- Bethnal Green North East in London 1918–1950

1885–1950
- Seats: one
- Created from: Hackney
- Replaced by: Bethnal Green

Bethnal Green North East was a parliamentary constituency in London, which returned one Member of Parliament (MP) to the House of Commons of the Parliament of the United Kingdom. It was created for the 1885 general election and abolished for the 1950 general election

== Boundaries ==

The constituency consisted of the north and east wards of the civil parish of Bethnal Green, Middlesex (later the Metropolitan Borough of Bethnal Green in the County of London).

1885-1918: The North and East wards of the parish of St. Matthew, Bethnal Green.

== Members of Parliament ==
Year	Member	Whip
1885	George Howell	Liberal
1895	Sir Mancherjee Bhownaggree	Conservative
1906	Sir Edwin Cornwall	Liberal
1916	Sir Edwin Cornwall	Coalition Liberal
1922	Sir Edwin Cornwall	National Liberal
1922	Garnham Edmonds	Liberal
1923	Walter Windsor	Labour
1929	Harry Nathan	Liberal
February 1933 ^{a}	Harry Nathan	Independent Liberal
June 1934 ^{b}	Harry Nathan	Labour
1935	Dan Chater	Labour
1950	constituency abolished - see Bethnal Green	

Notes:-

- ^{a} No election. Nathan resigned the Liberal whip.
- ^{b} No election. Nathan took the Labour whip.

== Election results ==
=== Elections in the 1880s ===
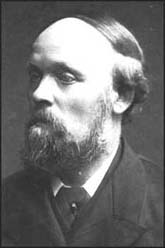
George Howell

General election 1885: Bethnal Green North East
Party	Candidate	Votes	%
Lib-Lab	George Howell	3,095	62.7
Conservative	John Dawson Mayne	1,844	37.3
Majority		1,251	25.4
Turnout		4,939	69.5
Registered electors		7,102	
Lib-Lab win (new seat)			

General election 1886: Bethnal Green North East
Party	Candidate	Votes	%	±%
Lib-Lab	George Howell	2,278	54.4	−8.3
Liberal Unionist	Edward John Stoneham	1,906	45.6	+8.3
Majority		372	8.8	−16.6
Turnout		4,184	58.9	−10.6
Registered electors		7,102		
Lib-Lab hold		Swing	−8.3	

=== Elections in the 1890s ===
General election 1892: Bethnal Green North East
Party	Candidate	Votes	%	±%
Lib-Lab	George Howell	2,918	54.4	0.0
Conservative	Harry Marks	2,321	43.2	−2.4
Social Democratic Federation	Hugh Robert Taylor	106	2.0	New
Independent	R. Ballard	23	0.4	New
Majority		597	11.2	+2.4
Turnout		5,368	72.2	+13.3
Registered electors		7,438		
Lib-Lab hold		Swing	+1.2	

General election 1895: Bethnal Green North East
Party	Candidate	Votes	%	±%
Conservative	Mancherjee Bhownaggree	2,591	51.6	+8.4
Lib-Lab	George Howell	2,431	48.4	−6.0
Majority		160	3.2	N/A
Turnout		5,022	67.6	−4.6
Registered electors		7,431		
Conservative gain from Lib-Lab		Swing	+7.2	

=== Elections in the 1900s ===
General election 1900: Bethnal Green North East
Party	Candidate	Votes	%	±%
Conservative	Mancherjee Bhownaggree	2,988	53.4	+1.8
Liberal	Harry Levy-Lawson	2,609	46.6	−1.8
Majority		379	6.8	+3.6
Turnout		5,597	69.9	+2.3
Registered electors		8,012		
Conservative hold		Swing	+1.8	

Cornwall

General election 1906: Bethnal Green North East
Party	Candidate	Votes	%	±%
Liberal	Edwin Cornwall	4,127	66.0	+19.4
Conservative	Mancherjee Bhownaggree	2,130	34.0	−19.4
Majority		1,997	32.0	N/A
Turnout		6,257	80.9	+11.0
Registered electors		7,730		
Liberal gain from Conservative		Swing	+19.4	

=== Elections in the 1910s ===
General election January 1910: Bethnal Green North East
Party	Candidate	Votes	%	±%
Liberal	Edwin Cornwall	3,842	61.2	−4.8
Conservative	John Molson	2,435	38.8	+4.8
Majority		1,407	22.4	−9.6
Turnout		6,277	83.1	+2.2
Liberal hold		Swing	−4.8	

General election December 1910: Bethnal Green North East
Party	Candidate	Votes	%	±%
Liberal	Edwin Cornwall	3,188	61.0	−0.2
Conservative	John Molson	2,037	39.0	+0.2
Majority		1,151	22.0	−0.4
Turnout		5,225	69.2	−13.9
Liberal hold		Swing	−0.2	

General election 1914–15:

Another general election was required to take place before the end of 1915. The political parties had been making preparations for an election to take place and by July 1914, the following candidates had been selected;

- Liberal: Edwin Cornwall
- Unionist:

General election 1918: Bethnal Green North East
Party		Candidate	Votes	%	±%
C	National Liberal	Edwin Cornwall	4,448	56.4	−4.6
	National	Wilfred Liddell Steel	2,312	29.3	New
	Health	William Shadforth	1,127	14.3	New
Majority			2,136	27.1	+5.1
Turnout			25,253	31.2	−38.0
	National Liberal hold		Swing	N/A	
C indicates candidate endorsed by the coalition government.

=== Elections in the 1920s ===
General election 1922: Bethnal Green North East
Party	Candidate	Votes	%	±%
Liberal	Garnham Edmonds	5,774	36.1	New
Communist	Walter Windsor	5,659	35.3	New
Unionist	Eric Alfred Hoffgaard	2,806	17.5	New
National Liberal	George Garro-Jones	1,780	11.5	−44.9
Majority		115	0.8	−26.3
Turnout		27,262	58.8	+27.6
Liberal gain from National Liberal		Swing	N/A	

General election 1923: Bethnal Green North East
Party	Candidate	Votes	%	±%
Labour	Walter Windsor	7,415	45.7	+12.4
Liberal	Garnham Edmonds	6,790	41.8	+5.7
Unionist	Robert Tasker	2,035	12.5	−5.0
Majority		625	3.9	N/A
Turnout		27,468	59.1	+0.3
Labour gain from Liberal		Swing	+3.3	

General election 1924: Bethnal Green North East
Party	Candidate	Votes	%	±%
Labour	Walter Windsor	9,560	50.2	+4.5
Liberal	Garnham Edmonds	9,465	49.8	+8.0
Majority		95	0.4	−3.5
Turnout		27,827	68.4	+9.3
Labour hold		Swing	−1.8	

General election 1929: Bethnal Green North East
Party	Candidate	Votes	%	±%
Liberal	Harry Nathan	11,690	47.4	−2.4
Labour	Walter Windsor	11,101	44.9	−5.3
Unionist	James Alan Bell	1,908	7.7	New
Majority		589	2.5	N/A
Turnout		34,453	71.7	+3.3
Liberal gain from Labour		Swing	+1.5	

=== Elections in the 1930s ===
General election 1931: Bethnal Green North East
Party	Candidate	Votes	%	±%
Liberal	Harry Nathan	13,135	55.9	+8.5
Labour	William Barratt	10,368	44.1	−0.8
Majority		2,767	11.8	+9.3
Turnout		34,377	68.4	−3.3
Liberal hold		Swing	+4.7	

General election 1935: Bethnal Green North East
Party	Candidate	Votes	%	±%
Labour Co-op	Dan Chater	11,581	63.5	+19.4
Liberal	Joseph Burton Hobman	6,644	36.5	−19.4
Majority		4,937	27.0	N/A
Turnout		32,809	55.5	−12.9
Labour Co-op gain from Liberal		Swing	+19.4	

=== Elections in the 1940s ===
General election 1939–40

Another general election was required to take place before the end of 1940. The political parties had been making preparations for an election to take place and by the autumn of 1939, the following candidates had been selected;

- Labour: Dan Chater
- Liberal: Ormond Lewis

General election 1945: Bethnal Green North East
Party	Candidate	Votes	%	±%
Labour Co-op	Dan Chater	7,696	59.9	−3.6
Liberal	Paul Wright	3,979	30.9	−5.6
Conservative	William Sackville	1,185	9.2	New
Majority		3,717	29.0	+2.0
Turnout		19,225	66.9	+11.4
Labour Co-op hold		Swing	+1.0	
