= Bethnal Green Town Hall =

Municipal building in London, England

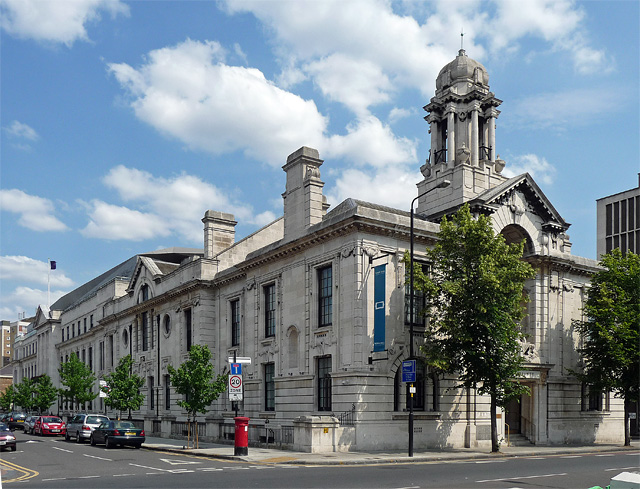
- Bethnal Green Town Hall

- Shown in Tower Hamlets
- 51.5304°N 0.0560°W
- Location: Patriot Square, Bethnal Green

History
- Built: 1910

Site notes
- Architect(s): Percy Robinson and William Alban Jones
- Architectural style: Baroque style

Listed Building – Grade II
- Designated: 27 September 1973
- Reference no.: 1065243

Bethnal Green Town Hall is a former municipal building on the corner of Cambridge Heath Road and Patriot Square in Bethnal Green, London. It is a Grade II listed building.

== History ==
The building was commissioned to replace an aging mid-19th century vestry hall on St Matthews Row, which had been used by the Parish of St Matthew. The vestry hall had become the headquarters of the Metropolitan Borough of Bethnal Green in 1900. After the vestry hall had become inadequate for the council's needs, civic leaders decided to procure a new town hall. The site selected for the new building had previously been occupied by residential properties known as 2-16 Patriot Square.

The foundation stone for the new building was laid on 23 September 1909. The new building was designed by Percy Robinson and William Alban Jones in the Baroque style and built by Brand, Pettit and Co. It was officially opened on 1 November 1910. The design involved a symmetrical main frontage with three bays facing onto Cambridge Heath Road; the central bay featured a doorway on the ground floor, a large arched recess on the first floor and a domed tower above. A large sculpture depicting Charity, designed by Henry Poole, was installed above the main doorway. The building extended back for nine bays along Patriot Square, with a smaller sculpture depicting Justice, also designed by Poole, installed in the middle of that elevation. Internally, the principal room was the council chamber on the first floor containing statues depicting Truth and Happiness, again designed by Poole.

The Easter conference of the British Socialist Party (BSP) was held in the building between 4 April 1920 and 5 April 1920. John MacLean, the Bolshevik Consul in Glasgow used the occasion to denounce the party leaders as being police spies, an accusation for which there was no evidence. According to MacLean, a private meeting was held at which William McLaine, one of the delegates of the BSP sent to the 2nd World Congress of the Comintern, was instructed to report to Lenin himself that MacLean was no longer reliable as he was suffering from "hallucinations".

The building was substantially extended to the east further along Patriot Square, to the designs of E. C. P. Monson in the neoclassical style, with the works being completed in October 1939. The extension, which added an extra 21 bays to the Patriot Square elevation, featured a three-bay central section with a sculpture depicting the Blind Beggar of Bethnal Green above the doorway, (Note: The story of how Henry de Montfort went from landed gentry to poor beggar became popular in the Tudor period, and was revived by Percy’s Reliques of Ancient English Poetry, published in 1765.) three windows on each of the first and second floors and a pediment above. Internally, the principal rooms were the new council chamber, which was richly panelled with Australian walnut, and the mayor's room, both on the first floor. Consideration was given to incorporating a public hall into the design for the extension but council leaders decided to adapt York Hall, which had originally been planned as public baths, to accommodate a wider variety of uses instead.

The building continued to function as the local seat of government for the enlarged London Borough of Tower Hamlets when it was formed in 1965. After the council moved to more modern facilities at Mulberry Place in 1993, the building lay vacant although the panelled council chamber was used as a location for several films including Lock, Stock and Two Smoking Barrels, released in 1998, and Atonement, released in 2007.

In 2007 the building was sold to the hotelier, Loh Lik Peng, who converted it into a series of apartments and a 98-bedroom hotel called "Town Hall Hotel", to a design by the architectural firm, Rare Architecture, preserving much of the Art Deco interior and covering much of the rear of the building with an unusual laser cut aluminium skin. After the hotel was officially opened in November 2010, the scheme received the "project of the year" award from the Royal Institute of British Architects in 2011.
