= 1900 Bethnal Green Borough Council election =

Local election in England

1900 Bethnal Green Metropolitan Borough Council election
- 2 November 1900

All 30 councillors on Bethnal Green Metropolitan Borough Council
- Turnout: 45.8%
	First party	Second party
Party	Progressive	Moderate
Seats won	22	8

The first election to Bethnal Green Metropolitan Borough Council took place on 2 November 1900.

== Electoral arrangements ==
The County of London, outside of the City of London, was divided into 28 metropolitan boroughs. One of these, the Metropolitan Borough of Bethnal Green, was divided into four wards, each electing either 6 or 9 councillors, to give a total of 30 councillors on Bethnal Green Metropolitan Borough Council. Councillors were elected for a three year term, to go out of office in 1903. Polling took place on 2 November 1900.

== Results ==
=== General elections of councillors ===
1900 Bethnal Green Metropolitan Borough Council election
Party	Seats	Gains	Losses	Net gain/loss	Seats %	Votes %	Votes	+/−
Progressive	22							
Moderate	8							

=== Aldermanic election ===
In addition to the 30 elected councillors, there were 5 aldermen on the council. The aldermanic election took place at the first meeting of the council on 9 November 1900. The 3 aldermen with the least votes were elected to serve until 1903 and the other 2 until 1906. Subsequent aldermanic elections were for six-year terms.

Aldermen elected in 1900, to retire in 1903:

Party	Alderman	Votes
Moderate	James Bishop	5
Progressive	William Rawles	15
Progressive	Thomas Kippins	15

Aldermen elected in 1900, to retire in 1906:

Party	Alderman	Votes
Progressive	Oliver Hales (Note: Replaced by Charles Fox in September 1903.)	22
Progressive	William Clark	22

== Ward results ==
The results for each ward were as follows:

=== Ward No. 1: North ===
Ward No. 1: North (6)
Party	Candidate	Votes	%	±%
Progressive	A. Barnard	810	54.0	
Progressive	T. Goodwin	736		
Progressive	G. English	732		
Progressive	J. Nolan	715		
Progressive	Joe Norris	711		
Progressive	F. Read	710		
Moderate	E. Luffingham	513	34.2	
Moderate	E. Berdoe	510		
Moderate	A. Hirst	470		
Moderate	F. Matthews	464		
Moderate	J. Potter	460		
Moderate	G. Woolley	446		
Independent	T. Hale	177	11.8	
Turnout				
Progressive win (new seat)				
Progressive win (new seat)				
Progressive win (new seat)				
Progressive win (new seat)				
Progressive win (new seat)				
Progressive win (new seat)				

=== Ward No. 2: East ===
Ward No. 2: East (9)
Party	Candidate	Votes	%	±%
Progressive	W. Farebrother	1,156	35.2	
Moderate	C. Blow	1,121	34.2	
Progressive	J. Hall	1,087		
Progressive	W. Belsham	1,073		
Progressive	H. Coffin	1,031		
Progressive	E. Hardy	1,019		
Progressive	Garnham Edmonds	1,009		
Progressive	H. Goodman	998		
Moderate	James Walker	929		
Progressive	William Rawles	914		
Progressive	R. Larkins	862		
Moderate	C. Mundy	847		
Moderate	F. Dabbs	785		
Moderate	R. Chitson	751		
Moderate	T. Read	733		
Moderate	T. Dupree	723		
Moderate	A. Buckea	718		
Moderate	A. Taylor	663		
Ind. Moderate	F. Staines	633	19.3	
Independent	W. Herrmann	370	11.3	
Turnout				
Progressive win (new seat)				
Moderate win (new seat)				
Progressive win (new seat)				
Progressive win (new seat)				
Progressive win (new seat)				
Progressive win (new seat)				
Progressive win (new seat)				
Progressive win (new seat)				
Moderate win (new seat)				

=== Ward No. 3: South ===
Ward No. 3: South (9)
Party	Candidate	Votes	%	±%
Progressive	H. Jones	1,006	48.1	
Progressive	J. Cole	965		
Progressive	G. Pitt	944		
Progressive	J. Neale	882		
Progressive	J. Richards	882		
Progressive	Felix Loughlin	876		
Progressive	J. Hobney	874		
Progressive	C. Wood	858		
Progressive	E. Roberts	848		
Moderate	C. Winter	723	34.6	
Moderate	W. Burrows	710		
Moderate	J. Pitman	666		
Moderate	C. Barnes	652		
Moderate	J. Behrend	624		
Moderate	C. Benham	600		
Moderate	C. Martin	576		
Moderate	H. Smith	537		
Moderate	I. Symons	432		
Independent	G. Fordree	362	17.3	
Independent	H. Marks	173		
Turnout				
Progressive win (new seat)				
Progressive win (new seat)				
Progressive win (new seat)				
Progressive win (new seat)				
Progressive win (new seat)				
Progressive win (new seat)				
Progressive win (new seat)				
Progressive win (new seat)				
Progressive win (new seat)				

=== Ward No. 4: West ===
Ward No. 4: West (6)
Party	Candidate	Votes	%	±%
Moderate	Thomas Francis	875	54.7	
Moderate	J. Fleming	854		
Moderate	J. Catherall	852		
Moderate	F. Rogers	844		
Moderate	J. Richardson	790		
Moderate	C. Walton	767		
Progressive	T. Brooks	725	45.3	
Progressive	Thomas Kippins	682		
Progressive	A. Days	680		
Progressive	T. Salmon	668		
Progressive	J. Fright	659		
Progressive	W. Ives	641		
Turnout				
Moderate win (new seat)				
Moderate win (new seat)				
Moderate win (new seat)				
Moderate win (new seat)				
Moderate win (new seat)				
Moderate win (new seat)				
