= DirectAsia =

Singapore insurance provider

- Industry: Insurance
- Founded: 2010
- Founder: Simon Birch
- Headquarters: Singapore
- Website: https://www.directasia.com/

DirectAsia is a Singapore-based motor and travel insurance provider.

== History ==
DirectAsia was founded in Singapore in 2010 and launched in Hong Kong in 2012 and in Thailand in 2013. During 2013, DirectAsia had gross written premiums of $25.3 million.

In 2014, DirectAsia was acquired by Hiscox Insurance to commit further to serving customers in Asia. Hiscox has reached a $55 million agreement with Whittington Group. DirectAsia was Hiscox's first business in Asia and built on its other direct-to-consumer operations in Europe and the US.

Simon Birch, the former managing director of Direct Asia, left that business in July 2015 following its acquisition by Hiscox. In March 2016, Hiscox group agreed to sell the Hong Kong division of DirectAsia business to WellLink. In October 2016, DirectAsia Group was announced as an Official Partner of Leicester City Football Club for the 2016/17 season. In October 2018, DirectAsia partnered with Prudential Singapore.

In 2024, Roojai Group, a Thai online insurance brokerage, acquired DirectAsia Thailand from Hiscox. Following the acquisition, DirectAsia’s Thailand operations were rebranded as Roojai Insurance, while its Singapore business retained the DirectAsia name.

== Investigation ==
In 2021, DirectAsia and 11 other insurance companies became victims of fraud by a Singaporean woman Wendy Tan Phaik Sim. She's defrauding 12 insurers of SG$30,900 through numerous false travel insurance claims for delayed baggage, despite not going on holidays.
