= Robert Hiscox =

British businessman, art collector and philanthropist

- Born: Robert Ralph Scrymgeour Hiscox; 4 January 1943 (age 83)
- Education: Rugby School
- Alma mater: Corpus Christi College, Cambridge
- Title: Former chairman, Hiscox
- Term: 1970–2013
- Predecessor: Ralph Hiscox
- Spouses: Lucy Mills; Lady Julia Meade
- Children: 5 sons
- Parent: Ralph Hiscox

Robert Ralph Scrymgeour Hiscox DL (born 4 January 1943) is a British businessman, art collector, and philanthropist. He was chairman of Hiscox Ltd, a firm of Lloyd's of London underwriters, for 43 years until his retirement in 2013.

== Career ==
Hiscox is the son of Ralph Hiscox, who was a founding partner in Roberts & Hiscox in 1946. He was educated at Rugby School, followed by Corpus Christi College, Cambridge, where he earned a degree in economics and law. He joined Hiscox Ltd in 1965 as an underwriter of fine art and personal accident insurance.

After his father died in 1970, he took control of the partnership as Anthony Roberts, the other co-founder, moved aside. Roberts & Hiscox gradually incorporated, starting in 1993 by becoming Hiscox plc. It grew from a Lloyd's underwriter to the international insurance company, Hiscox Ltd, headquartered in Bermuda. He was the company's chairman for 43 years until his retirement in 2013, then honorary president until 2017.

Hiscox was deputy chairman of Lloyd's from 1993 to 1995, and helped save it from the brink of collapse.

== Philanthropy ==
Hiscox is chairman of the Wiltshire Bobby Van Trust, a charity which works in partnership with Wiltshire Police to provide home security advice for elderly, vulnerable and disadvantaged people throughout Wiltshire.

He has hosted the Wiltshire Steam and Vintage Rally annually in June for a number of years, at Rainscombe Park, Oare, Wiltshire. In 2014, he saved the White Horse Bookshop on Marlborough High Street from closure. He was High Sheriff of Wiltshire in 2011–2012 and a Deputy Lieutenant of Wiltshire until 2018.

== Personal life ==
Hiscox was married first to Lucy Mills, and secondly to Lady Julia Meade (third daughter of the 6th Earl of Clanwilliam). He has five sons, and lives in Wiltshire.
