= Ralph Hiscox =

British insurance executive (1907–1970)

Ralph Hiscox CBE (1907–1970) was an Underwriter at Lloyd's of London, a founding partner of Roberts & Hiscox in 1946, and the chairman of Lloyd's of London 1967–68.

Hiscox served in the RAF from 1939 to 1945, during World War II. He was appointed the military OBE.

He was appointed a CBE for services to the insurance industry in 1969.

After Hiscox's sudden death in 1970, the other co-founder, Anthony Roberts, moved aside, and Hiscox's son Robert Hiscox took over. Robert remained the chairman of Hiscox for 43 years.
