= Garnham Edmonds =

Garnham Edmonds JP (20 April 1865 – 9 April 1946) was a British butcher and Liberal politician who was both an MP and Mayor of Bethnal Green.

== Background ==
Edmonds was described as tall, handsome, with a great shock of hair. He had a daughter, Kate E. Rawles, who was awarded the MBE.

== Professional career ==
Edmonds was a butcher in Bethnal Green, East London, trading as Edmonds and Mears tripe dressers. His butchers shop was located in Bethnal Green Road and sold tripe and offal. After his election to parliament he continued to serve behind the counter and would travel each morning at 6.30am to Smithfield Market to make purchases. He was also a religious and social worker.

== Political career ==
Edmonds was President of the local Liberal association. He was elected a member of Bethnal Green Metropolitan Borough Council at the 1900 election, and was mayor of the borough from 1907–08. In 1910 he was elected as a Progressive Party member of the London County Council, holding his seat until retiring in 1922. In the general election of that year he was elected as Member of Parliament for Bethnal Green North East with a majority of 115 votes over Walter Windsor of the Labour Party. However, a further election was held in 1923, and Edmonds was unseated by Windsor. He again contested the seat in 1924 but lost by 95 votes. He continued as prospective Liberal candidate until resigning in 1926. He did not stand for parliament again. He did return to local politics, being elected again to Bethnal Green Council, serving as Chairman of the Baths Committee. He served as a Justice of the peace for the County of London.

=== Electoral record ===
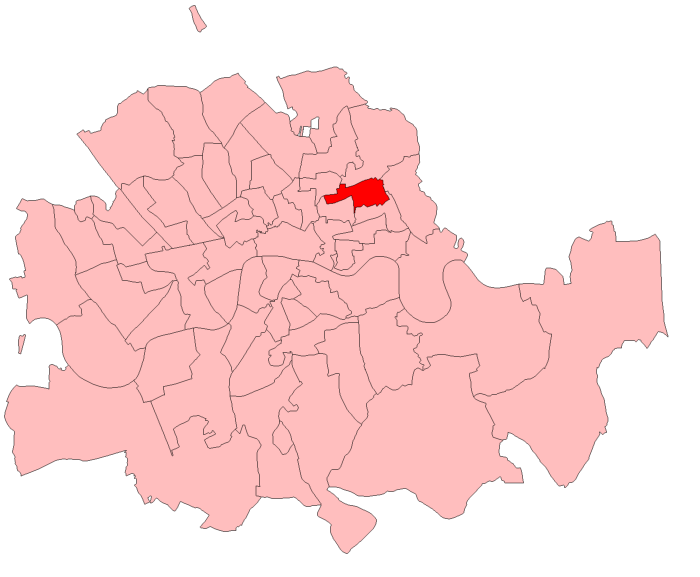

Bethnal Green North East
Party	Candidate	Votes	%	±%
Progressive	Garnham Edmonds	3,423	36.6	
Progressive	Edward A. Smith	3,369	36.1	
Municipal Reform	Alexander Edwards	1,327	14.2	
Municipal Reform	William Long Restall	1,221	13.1	
Majority		2,042	21.9	
Progressive hold		Swing		

Bethnal Green North East
Party	Candidate	Votes	%	±%
Progressive	Garnham Edmonds	2,731	29.4	−7.2
Progressive	Edward A. Smith	2,667	28.7	−7.4
Municipal Reform	G. Allen	1,961	21.1	+6.9
Municipal Reform	Thomas Andrew Blane	1,941	20.9	+7.8
Majority		706	7.6	−14.3
Progressive hold		Swing	−7.1	

London County Council election, 1919: Bethnal Green North East
Party	Candidate	Votes	%	±%
Progressive	Sir Edward A. Smith	Unopposed	n/a	n/a
Progressive	Garnham Edmonds	Unopposed	n/a	n/a
Progressive hold		Swing	n/a	
Progressive hold		Swing	n/a	

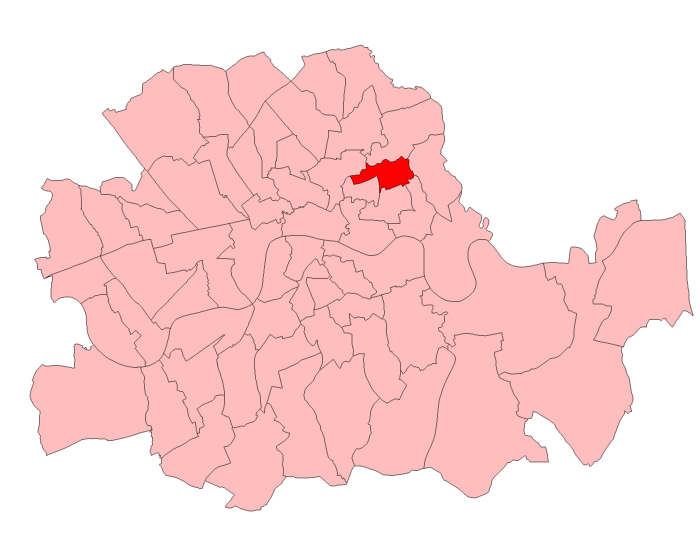

General election 1922: Bethnal Green North East
Party	Candidate	Votes	%	±%
Liberal	Garnham Edmonds	5,774	36.1	−20.3
Communist	Walter Windsor	5,659	35.3	n/a
Unionist	Eric Alfred Hoffgaard	2,806	17.5	n/a
National Liberal	George Garro-Jones	1,780	11.5	n/a
Majority		115	0.8	−26.3
Turnout		27,262	58.8	+27.6
Liberal hold		Swing	n/a	

General election 1923: Bethnal Green North East
Party	Candidate	Votes	%	±%
Labour	Walter Windsor	7,415	45.7	+12.4
Liberal	Garnham Edmonds	6,790	41.8	+5.7
Unionist	Robert Tasker	2,035	12.5	−5.0
Majority		625	3.9	4.7
Turnout		27,468	59.1	+0.3
Labour gain from Liberal		Swing	+3.3	

General election 1924: Bethnal Green North East
Party	Candidate	Votes	%	±%
Labour	Walter Windsor	9,560	50.2	+4.5
Liberal	Garnham Edmonds	9,465	49.8	+8.0
Majority		95	0.4	−3.5
Turnout		27,827	68.4	+9.3
Labour hold		Swing	−1.8	

== Death ==
Edmonds died at his home in Woodford Green, Essex, in April 1946, aged 81.

Parliament of the United Kingdom
Preceded by Sir Edwin Cornwall	Member of Parliament for Bethnal Green North East; 1922–1923	Succeeded by Walter Windsor
