= Aldgate Pump =

Historic water pump in London, England

Coordinates: 51°30′47″N 0°04′40″W

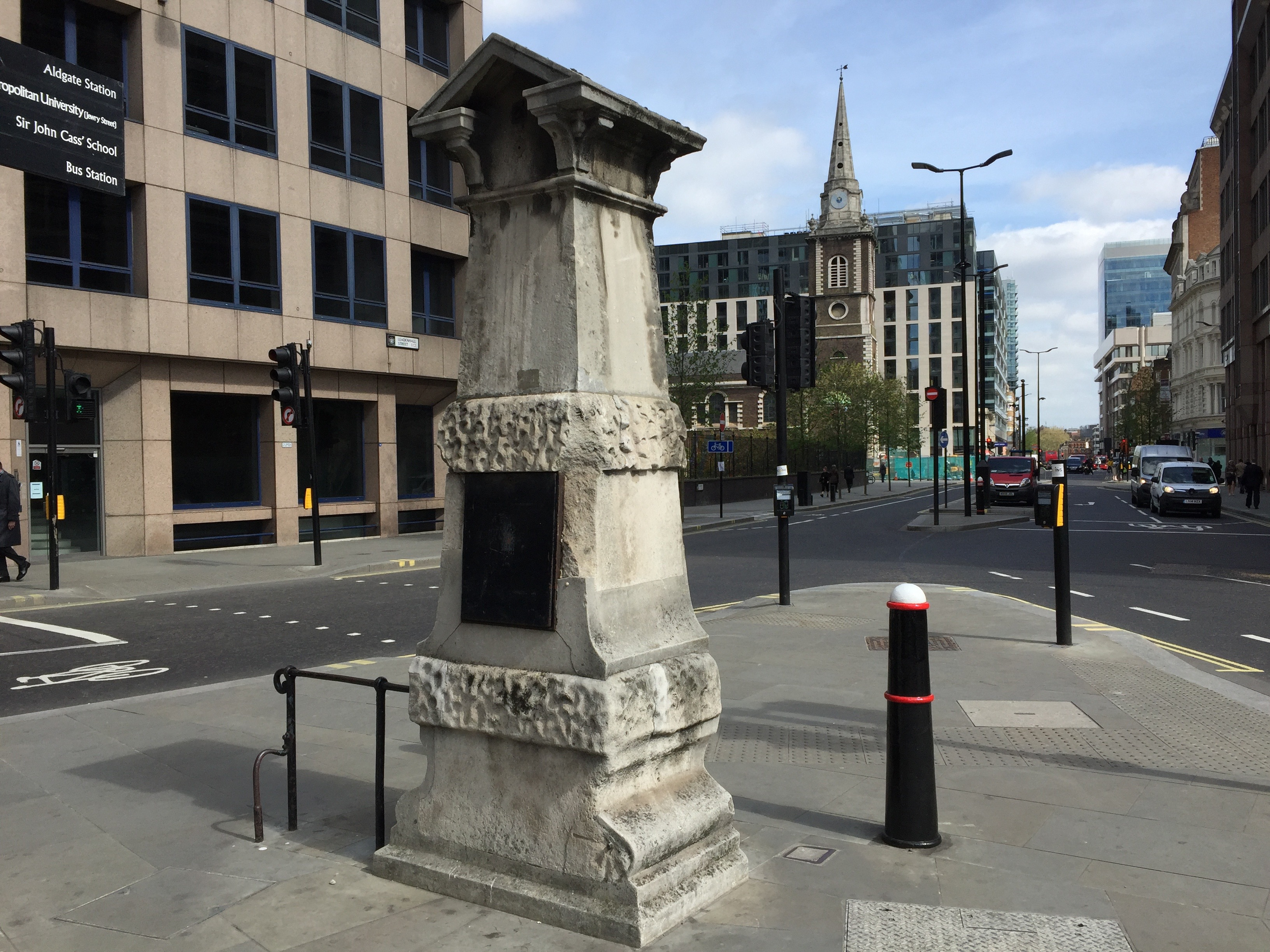
The Aldgate Pump, looking east towards Whitechapel prior to August 2019 restoration.

Aldgate Pump is a historic former water pump located at the junction where Aldgate High Street meets Fenchurch Street and Leadenhall Street in the City of London. The pump is considered to be the symbolic start point of the East End of London.

The pump is also notable for its long and sometimes dark history, along with its significant cultural references.

== Design ==
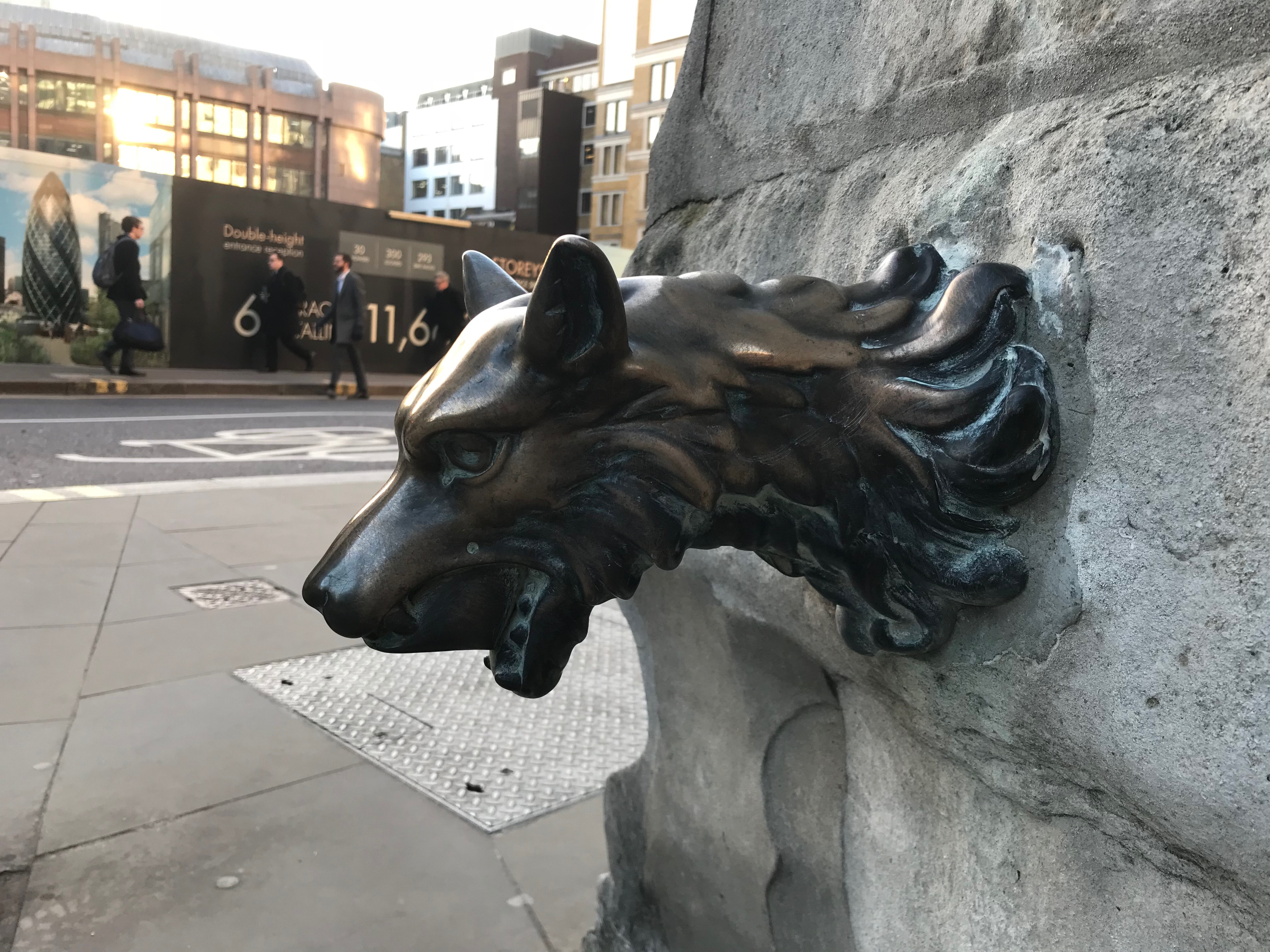
The wolf's head on Aldgate Pump

Aldgate Pump is a Grade II listed structure. The metal wolf head on the pump's spout is supposed to signify the last wolf shot in the City of London.

Historic photographs show that the pump was surmounted by an ornate wrought iron lantern. During the 20th century this was removed, but was recreated by the Bottega Prata workshop in Bologna, Italy, during its restoration by the Heritage of London Trust, unveiled in September 2019. The pump is no longer operational, though its drainage grating is still in place.

== History ==
As a well, it was mentioned during the reign of King John in the early 13th century.

A structure is shown on Braun and Hogenburg's map of 1574, and shown as St Michael’s Well on the Agas map of 1633. John Stow recalled the execution of the Bailiff of Romford on a gibbet 'near the well within Aldgate'. This execution seems to have been carried out on the dubious basis that he was involved in Kett's Rebellion of 1549.

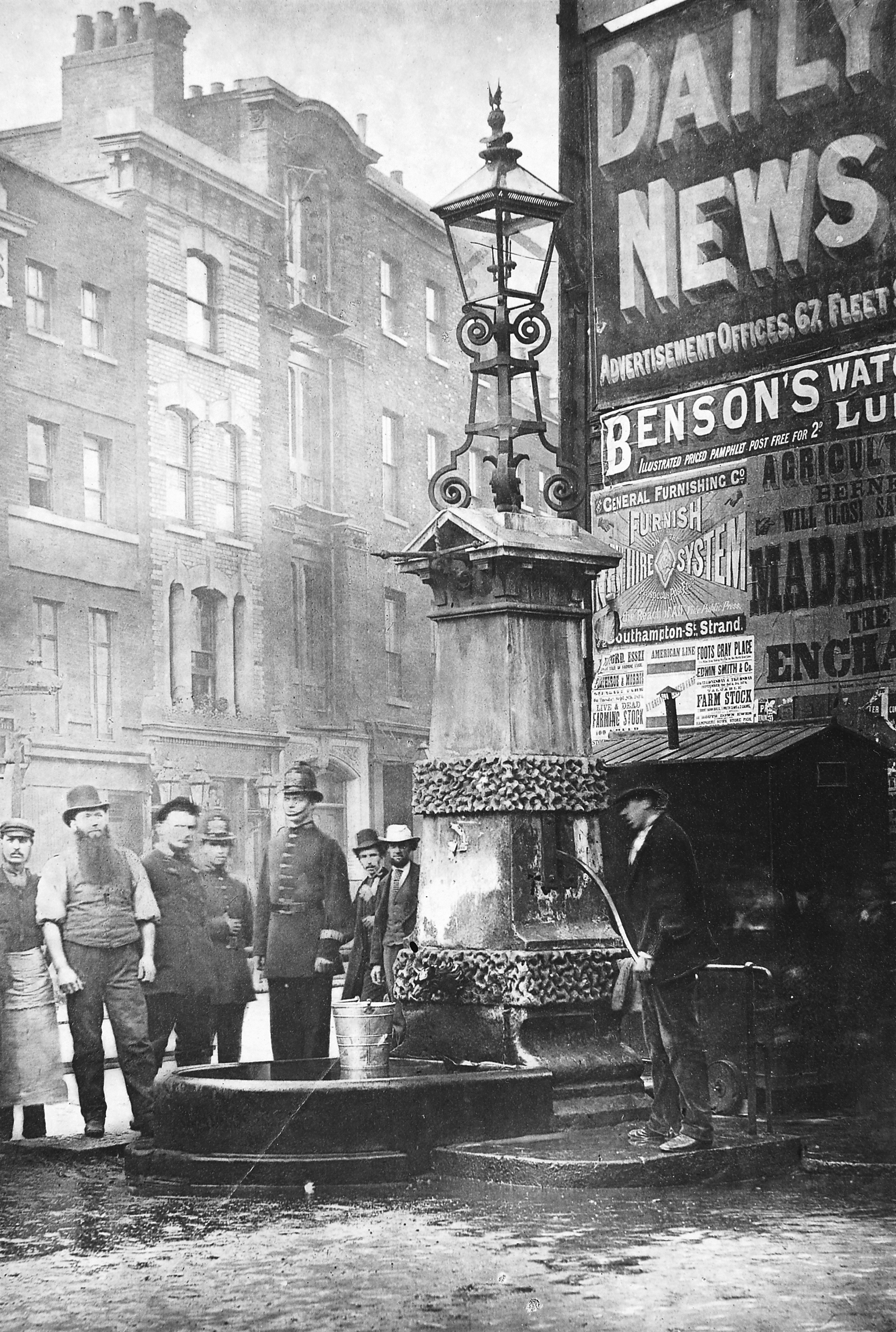
The pump in 1874

Served by one of London's many underground streams, the water was praised for being "bright, sparkling, and cool, and of an agreeable taste". These qualities were later found to be derived from decaying organic matter from adjoining graveyards, and the leaching of calcium from the bones of the dead in many new cemeteries in north London through which the stream ran from Hampstead. On its relocation in 1876, the New River Company changed the supplies to mains water.

Fenchurch Street railway station was built in 1841 upon the site of Aldgate Pump Court.

As the City of London developed, it is thought to have been taken down and moved a short distance to the west, to its current location in 1876, as a result of road widening.

== East End ==
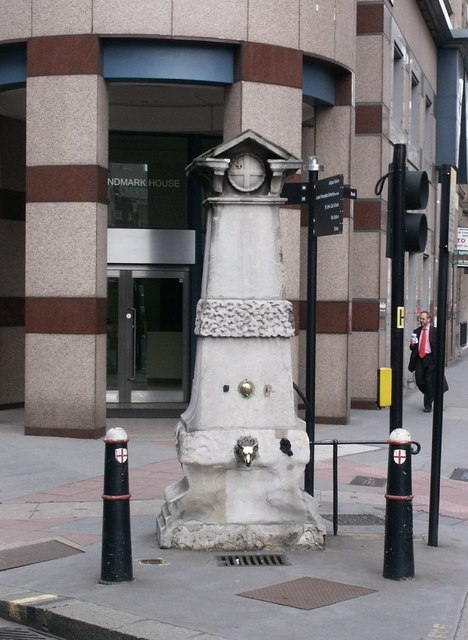
The pump has been at its current site since 1876

The line of the former eastern walls and gates of the City are taken as the usual start point of the East End, but the pump lies just inside the site of the former Aldgate. The pump is a suitable symbolic start point for several reasons:

- The removal of the gate and associated walls in the late 18th century gave the pump added significance.
- The social importance of pumps as meeting places
- The pump marks the start of the originally Roman A11 road, later known as the Great Essex Road. Distances to locations in the Tower division of Middlesex, Essex and East Anglia were measured from here.

== Cultural references ==
=== Phrases ===
East of Aldgate Pump is a term used to apply to the East End or East London as a whole, as in the old slur "East of Aldgate Pump, people cared for nothing but drink, vice and crime". It is also used in two phrases which seem to hark back to the epidemic:

- As Cockney Rhyming Slang; Aldgate Pump, or just Aldgate for short, rhymes with “get (or take) the hump”, i.e. to be annoyed.
- A draft on Aldgate Pump refers to a harmful, worthless or fraudulent financial transaction, such as a bouncing cheque. The pun is on a draught (or draft) of water and a draft of money.
- There's a pump up Aldgate, mate. Pump that! was an East End phrase directed at rent collectors believed to be pressing tenants unreasonably hard.

=== Music, TV and literature ===
Charles Dickens refers to the pump in The Uncommercial Traveller, published in 1860: "My day's no-business beckoning me to the East End of London. I had turned my face to that point of the metropolitan compass…and had got past Aldgate Pump."

Aldgate Pump was also the name of a song, written by G. W. Hunt for the lion comique Arthur Lloyd in 1869. In the song, the raconteur is abandoned by the girl "I met near Aldgate Pump".
