= Metropolitan Borough of Bethnal Green =

Civil parish and metropolitan borough in London, England

Coordinates: 51.5302°N 0.0551°W

Bethnal Green
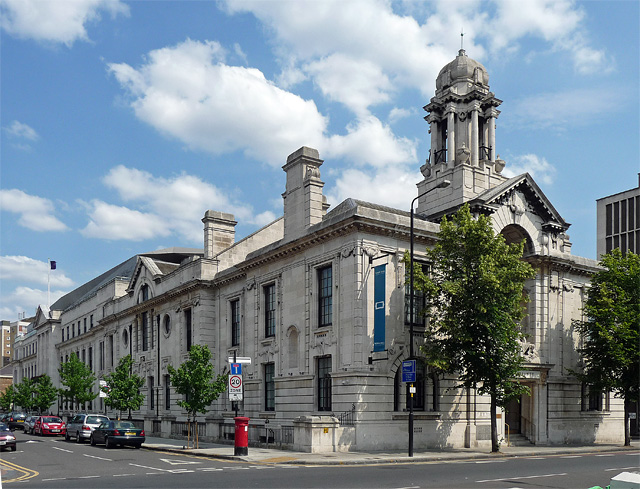
- Bethnal Green Town Hall

- Bethnal Green within the County of London
- Area
  - 1911/1961: 759 acres (3.07 km^{2})
  - 1931: 760 acres (3.1 km^{2})
- Population
  - 1911: 128,183
  - 1931: 108,194
  - 1961: 47,078
- Density
  - 1911: 169/acre
  - 1931: 142/acre
  - 1961: 62/acre
- History
  - Origin: Hamlet in parish of Stepney
  - Created: 1743
  - Abolished: 1965
  - Succeeded by: London Borough of Tower Hamlets
- Status: Civil parish (1743–1965); Poor law parish (1834–1930); Metropolitan borough (1900–1965)
- Government: Vestry of the Parish of Bethnal Green (1743–1900); Bethnal Green Borough Council (1900–1965)
  - HQ: Patriot Square
- Borough seal
- Map of borough boundary

Bethnal Green was a civil parish and a metropolitan borough of the County of London between 1899 and 1965, when it was merged with the Metropolitan Borough of Stepney and the Metropolitan Borough of Poplar to form the London Borough of Tower Hamlets.

It was formed as a civil parish in 1743 from the Bethnal Green hamlet in Stepney ancient parish, and the church of St Matthew, Bethnal Green, was dedicated in 1746.

The vestry became an electing authority to the Metropolitan Board of Works in 1855 and in 1889 it became part of the County of London. In the 1900 reform of local government caused by the London Government Act 1899 the parish became a metropolitan borough which bordered Hackney, Poplar, Stepney and Shoreditch. In 1965 it was abolished and merged into the London Borough of Tower Hamlets.

== Origins ==
1848 map of the parish of Bethnal Green

Until 1743 Bethnal Green formed a hamlet within the large parish of Stepney. By the 17th century the settlement had achieved a measure of self-government, with its own overseer, constable and beadle. It remained a rural area until the beginning of the 18th century, when the expansion of suburban London saw the development of the Brick Lane area in the south west of the hamlet. The population rapidly increased and in 1743 an act of parliament, the Bethnal Green Parish Act 1742 (16 Geo. 2. c. 28), constituted Bethnal Green as a separate parish.

As well as forming a parish for ecclesiastical purposes, Bethnal Green was also created a civil parish with responsibility for relief of the poor and maintenance of highways. The government of the parish was shared by a vestry, governors of the poor and two separate bodies of trustees. A further board of paving and lighting commissioners were established in 1843.

In 1855 the parish was included within the area of the Metropolitan Board of Works to which it nominated one member and the various local government bodies were replaced by a single incorporated vestry which consisted of 48 elected vestrymen.

Under the Metropolis Management Act 1855 any parish that exceeded 2,000 ratepayers was to be divided into wards; as such the incorporated vestry of St Matthew Bethnal Green was divided into four wards (electing vestrymen): No. 1 or East (9), No. 2 or North (9), No. 3 or West (15) and No. 4 or South (15).

In 1889 the Metropolitan Board was replaced by the London County Council, and Bethnal Green was formally removed from Middlesex to the new County of London.

== Ecclesiastical parish ==
Bethnal Green was part of the ancient parish of St Dunstan's, Stepney, in the Diocese of London; in 1743 the area was split off to form a new parish dedicated to St Matthew. From 1837, as the population of Bethnal Green increased, a number of new parishes were formed:

- St John, Bethnal Green, in 1837
- St Peter, Bethnal Green, in 1843
- St Andrew, Bethnal Green, in 1843
- St Philip, Bethnal Green, in 1843
- St James the Less, Bethnal Green, in 1843
- St Bartholomew, Bethnal Green, in 1844
- St James the Great, Bethnal Green, in 1844
- St Jude, Bethnal Green, in 1844
- St Matthias, Bethnal Green, in 1844
- St Simon Zelotes, Bethnal Green, in 1844
- St Thomas, Bethnal Green, in 1844
- St Paul, Bethnal Green, in 1865
- St Barnabas, Bethnal Green, in 1870

In addition, as the population increased, western parts of Bethnal Green were transferred into neighbouring Shoreditch as the new parish of Holy Trinity, Shoreditch, in 1866.

== Creation of the borough ==
Under the London Government Act 1899 the various vestries and district boards within the County of London were abolished and replaced by metropolitan borough councils. Accordingly, in 1900, a borough council consisting of a mayor, five aldermen and 30 councillors replaced the vestry. The boundaries of the borough and parish were realigned at the same time.

Bethnal Green Town Hall in Patriot Square was opened in 1910, and extended in 1936–9. The architects were Percy Robinson and William Alban Jones. In 2010 the building was reopened as a hotel; much of the original art deco interior has been retained.

== Borough seal ==
The borough seal depicted a scene based on The Beggar's Daughter of Bednall Green, a poem in Percy’s Reliques of Ancient English Poetry, published in 1765, but probably dating from the era of Elizabeth I. According to the legend related in the poem, a blind beggar living in Bethnal Green was in fact Henry de Montfort, eldest son of Simon de Montfort, having escaped from the field of the Battle of Evesham in 1265. His identity was revealed at the wedding feast of his daughter Bessie. A depiction of the beggar had appeared on the head of the beadle's staff dating from 1690.

== Politics ==
A map showing the wards of Bethnal Green Metropolitan Borough as they appeared in 1916.

In the first election to the borough council, held on 1 November 1900 the Progressives gained a majority, with 22 of the 30 councillors. The Moderates (supported by the Conservative Party) formed the 8 member opposition group. The Progressives increased their majority to 24 at the 1903 elections, and in 1906 they won all the seats on the council. The Progressives held the council against the Municipal Reform Party until 1919 when the Labour Party gained a majority. Progressives and Liberals regained control at the 1928 election, holding power until 1934.

In 1934, Labour again took control, and from that date held all the seats on the council until the borough's abolition.

For parliamentary elections, Bethnal Green was divided into two constituencies in 1885. Each consisted of two wards of the borough and earlier vestry:

- Bethnal Green North East (north and east wards)
- Bethnal Green South West (south and west wards).

In 1950, the borough's representation was decreased to a single constituency of Bethnal Green, which in 1955 was expanded to also include three wards from the neighbouring Metropolitan Borough of Hackney.

== Population and area ==
The area of the borough was 760 acres (3.1 km^{2}). It included the districts now known as Bethnal Green, Cambridge Heath, Bow, Whitechapel and Shoreditch, stretching to include part of the Boundary Estate in the west and parts of Mile End Park and Victoria Park in the east. In the south its boundary stopped just short of The Blind Beggar pub on Whitechapel Road. The populations recorded in National Censuses were:

Bethnal Green Vestry 1801–1899

Year	1801	1811	1821	1831	1841	1851	1861	1871	1881	1891
Population	22,310	33,619	45,676	62,018	74,088	90,193	105,101	120,104	126,961	129,132

Metropolitan Borough 1900–1961

Year	1901	1911	1921	1931	1941	1951	1961
Population	129,680	128,183	117,238	108,194		58,353	47,078

== Second World War ==
During World War II, the Borough suffered from heavy aerial bombing. It is estimated that 80 tons of bombs fell on this area alone, affecting 21,700 houses, destroying 2,233 and making a further 893 uninhabitable. During the course of the aerial bombardment, 555 people were killed, and 400 were seriously injured.
