= South Heaton =

- ward
- Location in Tyne and Wear
- Coordinates: 54.986°N 1.572°W
- OS grid reference: NZ274658
- Sovereign state: United Kingdom
- Country: England
- District: Tyne and Wear

South Heaton was a ward of Newcastle City Council in Newcastle upon Tyne, England. It covers the southern part of the Heaton district, and some north eastern parts of neighbouring Byker. It was abolished in 2018 and replaced by a new ward named Heaton.

The population of the ward taken at the 2011 census was 9,964.
