= Byker =

District of Newcastle upon Tyne, England

Coordinates: 54.9677°N 1.5645°W

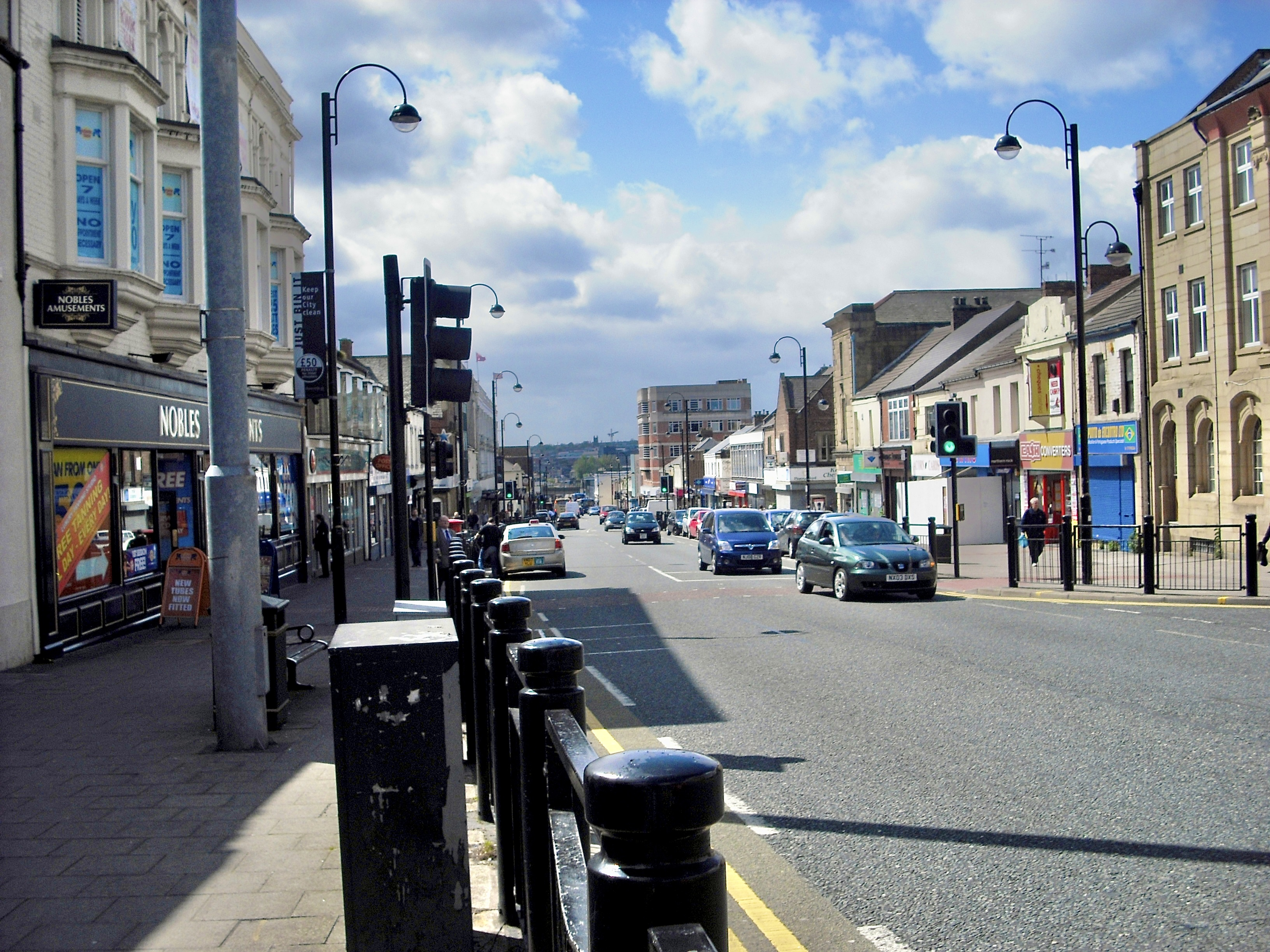
- Shields Road, Byker

- Location within Tyne and Wear
- OS grid reference: NZ279637
  - London: 242 miles (389 km)
- Metropolitan borough: Newcastle upon Tyne
- Metropolitan county: Tyne and Wear
- Region: North East
- Country: England
- Sovereign state: United Kingdom
- Post town: NEWCASTLE UPON TYNE
- Postcode district: NE6
- Dialling code: 0191
- Police: Northumbria
- Fire: Tyne and Wear
- Ambulance: North East
- UK Parliament: Newcastle upon Tyne East and Wallsend

Byker is a district in the east of the city and metropolitan borough of Newcastle upon Tyne, in the county of Tyne and Wear, England. Home to the Byker Wall estate, made famous by TV series Byker Grove, Byker's population was recorded at 12,206 in the 2011 census. Byker is bordered by Heaton to the north, Walker and Walkergate to the East and by the Shieldfield and Battlefield areas of Ouseburn Ward to the West.

== Etymology ==
The second element in the name Byker is Old Norse kjarr ("marsh"), with the first being either Norse byr ("farmstead") or Old English bi ("by, near").

== History ==
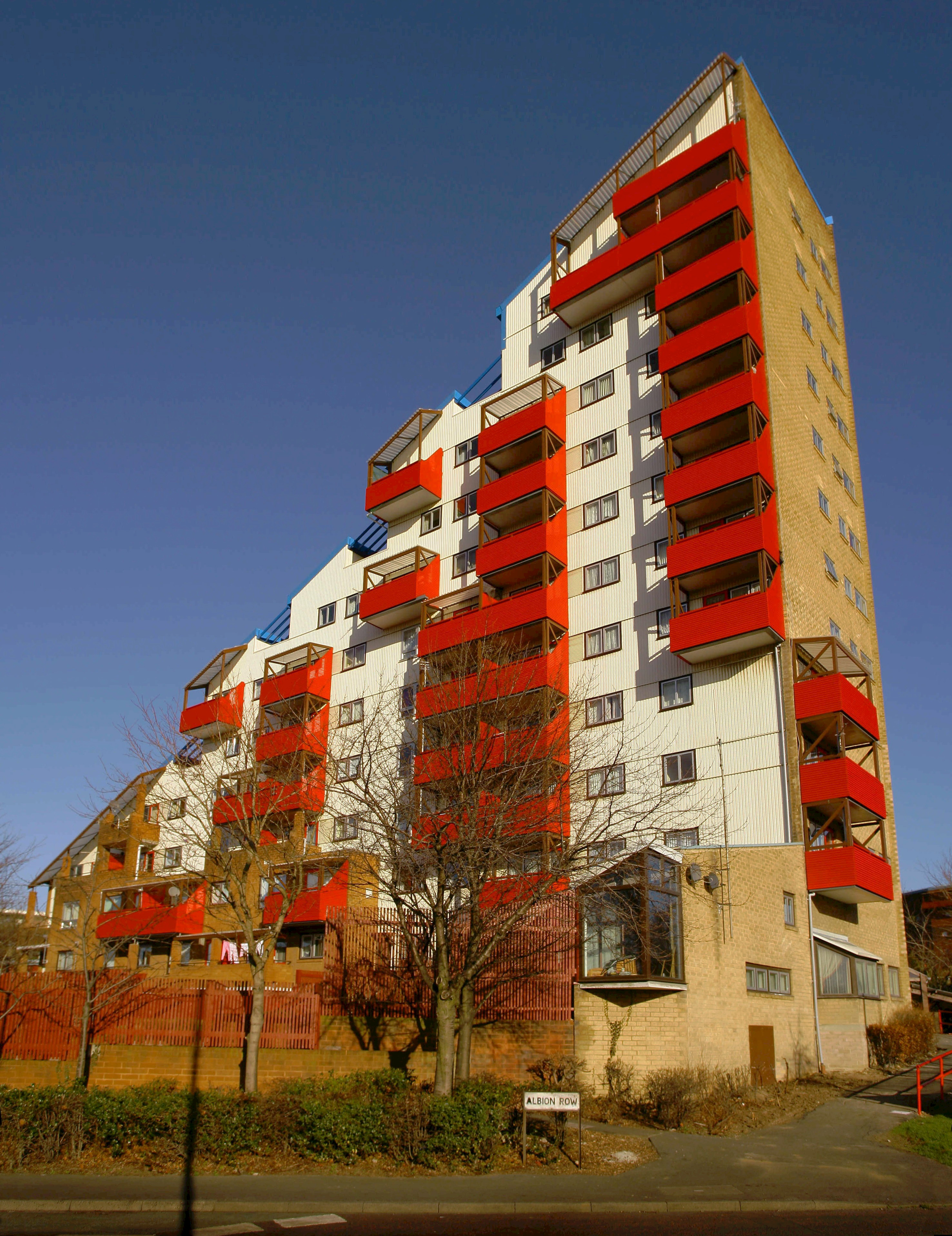
Tom Collins House, Byker

Possibly the earliest form of the visible evidence of development in Byker was by the Roman Emperor, Hadrian. A wall, turrets and milecastles, stretching from the east to the west coast provided a barrier to invading border clans and tribes. Hadrian's Wall lies just south of Shields Road and was excavated in the 1990s. The area was populated by soldiers and their suppliers of foods, livestock and trades, such as weavers, saddlers and blacksmiths amongst others. There are the remains of a milecastle or small fort near Newcastle Stadium.

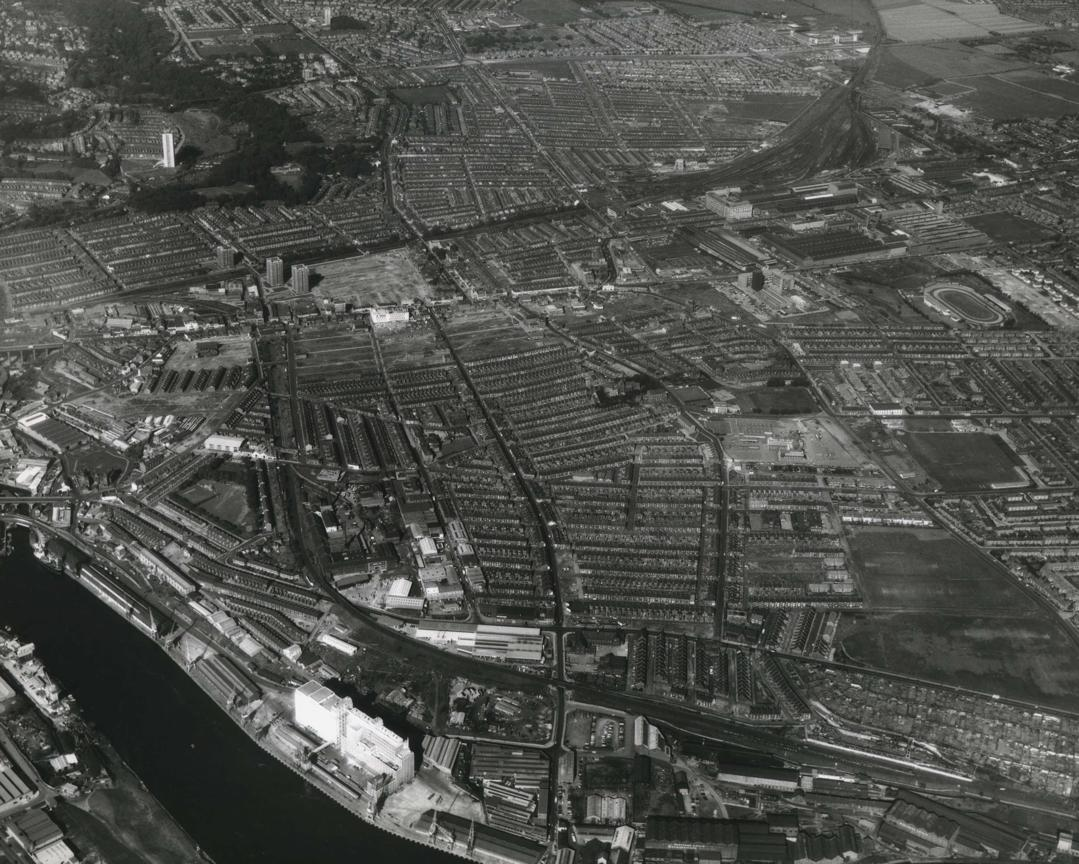
Byker in 1970

Byker first appeared in historical documents in 1198 ‘as the most important Serjeantry in Northumberland’ held by William of Byker, named William Escolland, who was a Norman noble. There were 4 taxpayers in 1296 and 5 recorded in 1312. In 1549 the Mayor and Burgesses of Newcastle sought to extend the borough's boundaries to include part of Byker Township, to take advantage of the land by the river ‘for the dropping of ballast for the coal trade’. The transaction was disputed due to financial disagreements and eventually settled in the House of Commons and the House of Lords in London.

The Municipal Corporations Act 1835 established Newcastle City Council and extended the boundaries of the city to include Elswick, Westgate, Jesmond, Heaton and Byker

Byker was formerly a township, in 1866 Byker became a separate civil parish, on 1 April 1914 the parish was abolished to form Newcastle upon Tyne. In 1911 the parish had a population of 48,709. It is now in the unparished area of Newcastle upon Tyne.

=== Development ===
Until the 1960s, Byker was a Victorian working-class area of densely built terraces. Much of the housing needed major repair and some was considered unfit for human habitation (many houses lacked bathrooms), yet most residents wanted to stay in Byker, an area close to industry on the riverside. In 1966 Newcastle City Corporation took the decision to redevelop the Byker area. The council aimed to clear the slums but keep the community.

Byker was extensively photographed before its demolition, primarily by Sirkka-Liisa Konttinen, who lived in Byker from 1969. The photographs that Konttinen took toured China in 1980 and later appeared in the book Byker.

Ralph Erskine was appointed as the architect in 1969 for the new Byker. The development was run as a "rolling programme" so local people could continue living in the area during the building work. Residents were involved in the design process and it is thought the outstanding success of Byker was as much to do with this as its innovative architecture which used a Functionalist Romantic style, differentiating the Estate from the Brutalist approach which was more common at the time.

New leisure and shopping facilities have been brought to the Shields Road area, while community led initiatives have encouraged the growth of local enterprise and enriched the social fabric of the estate. Byker and the Ouseburn area to the south have seen investment in recent years, becoming a cultural hub for the city. Byker Estate itself received a Grade II* listing in 2007 due to its architectural significance, and has since undergone a £25 million regeneration with a further £4 million of environmental upgrades to the area taking place in 2020.

In 2017 the Byker Wall estate was named as the best neighbourhood in the UK by the Academy of Urbanism's 'The Great Neighbourhood' award.

== In popular culture ==
Byker became well known as the setting of the BBC TV series Byker Grove (1989–2006); although set in the ward, the youth club featured in the series was filmed at The Mitre in the Benwell area in the west end of Newcastle.

== Education ==
The ward has three primary schools, St. Lawrence RC Primary School, Welbeck Academy and Byker Primary School, which is equipped with a nursery class. The ward does not have any secondary schools, the nearest secondary schools are Jesmond Park Academy, Walker Riverside Academy and Benfield School. Byker Primary School was rated 'Outstanding' in its Ofsted report of 2017.

== Recreation and leisure ==
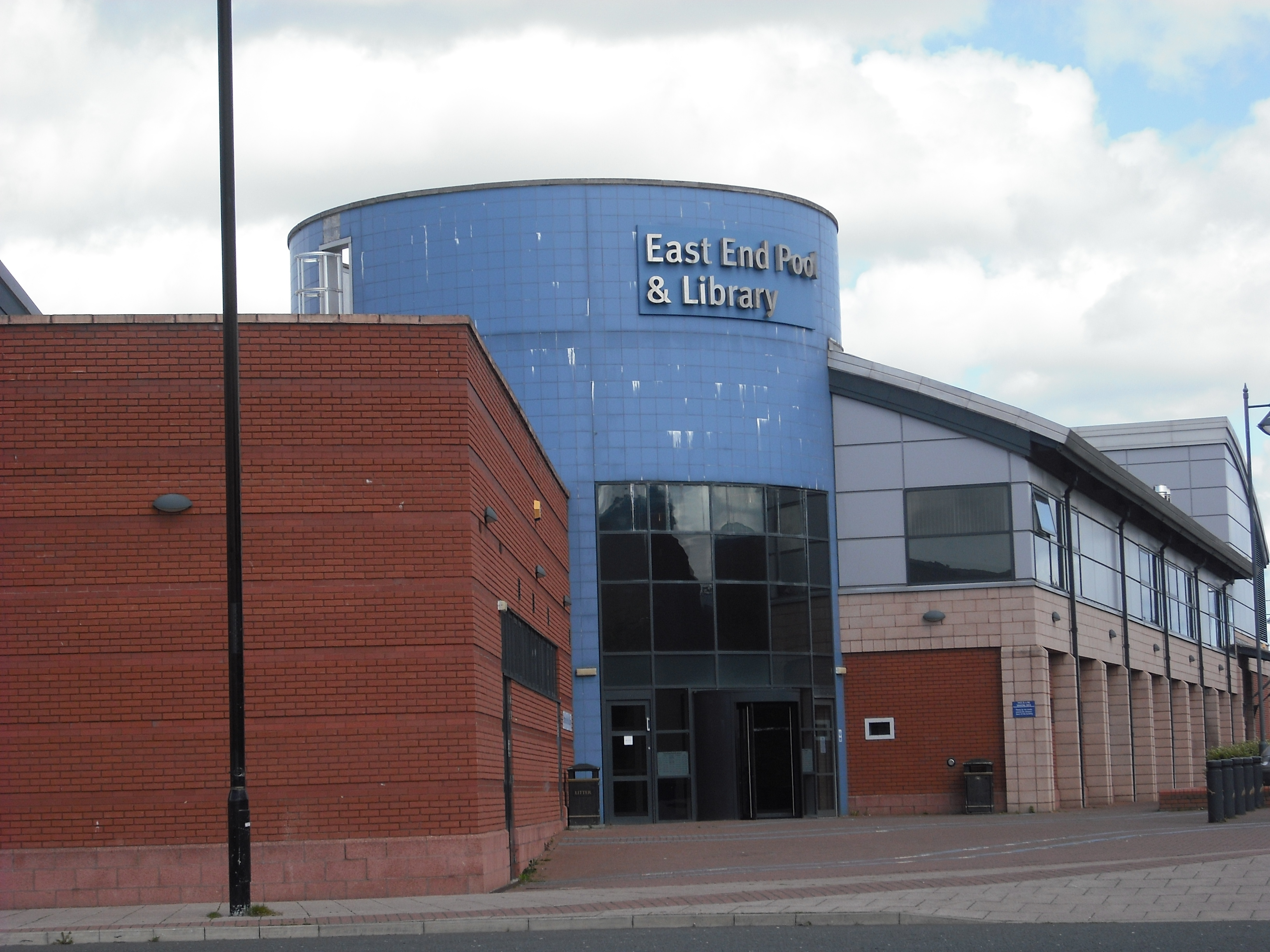
East End Pool and Library

Most of these facilities are in the bordering ward of South Heaton such as the East End Pool and Library on Corbridge Street. In March 2019 it was announced that the library would be transferred to the Shields Road Customer Service Centre in May 2019. The ward itself is at Garden City standards in terms of housing density, offering a number of well-maintained green open spaces. The ward hosts the 'Byker in Bloom' gardening competition which takes place every summer, and incorporates a number of different categories including 'Best Balcony' and 'Best Newcomer'. In 2008, Newcastle City Council agreed a lease of the former Byker Swimming Pool on Shipley Place which had remained closed and unused since the late 1990s, allowing it to be converted into an indoor bouldering and climbing centre known as 'Climb Newcastle'.

== Transport ==
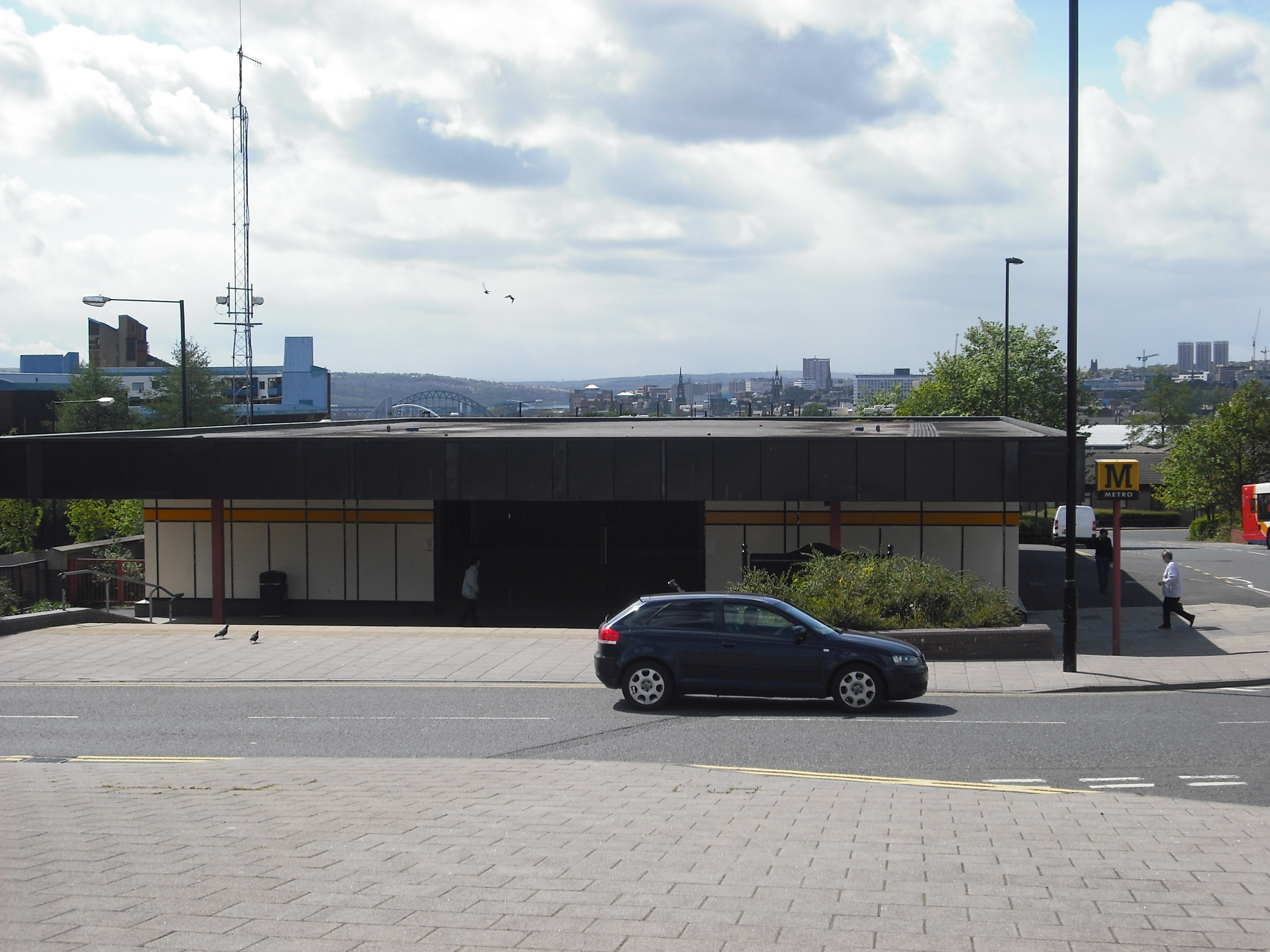
Byker Metro station

Car ownership in Byker was recorded at 35.4% (2001). The area is served by Byker Metro station and several bus services. The community bike project Recyke on Brinkburn Street provides bikes for local residents in need, and offers training in bike maintenance.

== Boundary ==
Byker ward stretches from the Fossway and Millers Road in the north of the ward to the banks of the River Tyne in the south. It heads south onto the Shields Road bypass (A187) and continues along the A193 bypass along Shields Road to the Ouse Burn. It turns south down the Ouse Burn to the River Tyne and follows the river east, turning northwards to the west of the properties on The Oval (and excluding the Bakewell Terrace properties). Heading east along Walker Road, the boundary then turns north up Monkchester Road and continues north. It turns west along Dunstanburgh Road, and then north between Welbeck Primary School grounds and the properties on Allendale Road. It turns east along Welbeck Road, then north up Scrogg Road, east at Middle Street, and north along Langley Road. The boundary then runs along the gardens at the back of Whinneyfield Road before turning west down the Fossway.

== Demographic characteristics ==
The results of the UK Census taken on 27 March 2011 for the Byker Ward show the total population on Census night was 12,206 people in 5,835 households.

Age group	Percentage
Under 15	19.0%
15-24	14.5%
25-64	54.0%
65+	12.5%

A quarter of people in the Byker ward have a long-term health problem or disability which affects day-to-day activities (25.0%). Lone parent households with dependent children accounted for 12.3% of all households, which is higher than the city average of 7.6%.

Byker has also experienced a large growth in Ethnic minorities, especially those of Polish and African backgrounds. In 2011, the White population was 88.9%, Asians were 4.2%, Black people were 4.1% and Mixed race were 1.6%.

== Sources ==
- Charleton, Robert John (1899). A History of Newcastle upon Tyne from the earliest records to its formation as a city. London: Walter Scott Ltd.
- Colls, Robert; Lancaster, Bill (2001). Newcastle upon Tyne. A Modern History. Chichester: Phillimore & Co Ltd. ISBN 1-86077-167-X.
