= David MacBeth =

English singer

- Also known as: David North, Ken Morris (on some single releases in Germany)
- Born: 1935 (age 90–91); Walker, Newcastle upon Tyne, England
- Genres: Pop
- Occupation: Singer
- Years active: Late 1950s–early 1970s
- Labels: Various including Pye, Piccadilly, Decca

David MacBeth (born 1935) is an English pop music singer. Despite releasing a string of singles on three record labels between 1959 and 1969, MacBeth's only chart success was with his version of "Mr. Blue", which peaked at number 18 in the UK Singles Chart. MacBeth took part in the 1963 Roy Orbison/The Beatles Tour.

== Life and career ==
MacBeth was born in Walker, Newcastle upon Tyne, England. His father worked as a joiner for the local council, whilst his mother was employed as an office cleaner. He attended Heaton Grammar School and thought about taking an apprenticeship to become a mechanical engineer with A. Reyrolle & Company. However, he joined Newcastle United F.C. as a junior, before National Service duties commenced in 1954, in the British Army. Whilst playing football in his Army days, an injury sustained to his cruciate ligament effectively curtailed that ambition. After returning to civilian life, MacBeth found employment as a travelling salesman promoting Andrews Liver Salts. During weekends, MacBeth started singing in local clubs, and he appeared on The Carroll Levis Discovery Show, at the Sunderland Empire Theatre. This exposure led to him making a number of appearances on Tyne Tees Television, who suggested he was billed as 'David North', when he was a regular performer on the station's The One O'Clock Show. After a while, his performance on a Tyne Tees talent contest, The Golden Disc, saw MacBeth granted a recording contract. Pye Records suggested renaming him Scott Weston, but MacBeth responded, "I said it sounded like a biscuit company, so they asked me what my real name was... They thought it was fantastic".

His debut recording in 1959 was "Mr. Blue", a reworking of the Fleetwoods' Stateside chart topper. "Mr. Blue" peaked at number 18 in the UK Singles Chart in November 1959, spending four weeks in the listing. Joe Meek produced the recording. The same year, MacBeth appeared on Associated Television programmes, Disc Break and Music Shop plus Granada's The Song Parade. He released five more singles on Pye Records over the next two years, but could not repeat his chart success. On 25 January 1960, MacBeth was a guest on "Midday Music-Hall" on the BBC Light Programme. On 16 September and again on 4 November 1961, MacBeth was on Thank Your Lucky Stars, singing "Just A Twinkle (In Your Daddy's Eye)". The latter track was his first single on Decca Records, which was issued in October 1961.

In mid-1962, MacBeth represented Britain at the European Knokke Festival in Belgium. In July that year he switched to Piccadilly Records, who released his version of Bobby Vinton's US number one hit, "Roses Are Red (My Love)". The B-side of the single was "Little Heart", which had been written by Les Vandyke. Over this period, MacBeth was the compere on three separate occasions at the London Palladium. On 20 May 1963, the third date of the Roy Orbison/The Beatles Tour, MacBeth performed at the Gaumont Cinema, Southampton. Also on the bill were Gerry and the Pacemakers, Louise Cordet, Tony Marsh, Terry Young Six, Erkey Grant and Ian Crawford. The round Britain tour took in 42 locations on successive evenings. His subsequent single releases continued to flop and he turned to the cabaret circuit, before taking up work as a music agent in 1965. He had married a model, Margaret, in the meantime and they relocated to the south of England, before returning to Tyneside a few years later.

In 1969, MacBeth was talked back into recording, and in May that year he released "Does Anybody Miss Me", on Pye Records, which was written by Tony Hatch and Jackie Trent. The comeback was short-lived but he achieved his entertainment ambition of owning Grey's Club in Newcastle. He bought the premises in 1982, having had his first attempt to purchase it, in 1978, thwarted by Ladbrokes who gazumped his offer. He sold the club in 2000, and retired to enjoy golf whilst residing in Darras Hall, Ponteland.

In May 2003, MacBeth gave a one-off performance in Edinburgh, backed by a 35-piece orchestra at a tribute concert for Johnny Keating, who was born in the city.

Some of his recordings have appeared on various artist compilation albums in recent years. "Mr. Blue" is a track on The 1959 British Hit Parade, Pt. 2: July–December (2011), whilst The 1962 British Hit Parade, Pt. 2: May–September (2013) contains "Roses Are Red (My Love)", and British Hit Parade 1962: The B-Sides, Vol. 2 (2013) contains "Little Heart".

== UK chart singles discography ==
Year	Title	Record label	UK Singles Chart
1959	"Mr. Blue"	Pye Records	No. 18
