= Mary Ward Centre =

Adult education college in Stratford, London

Coordinates: 51.5365°N 0.0035°W

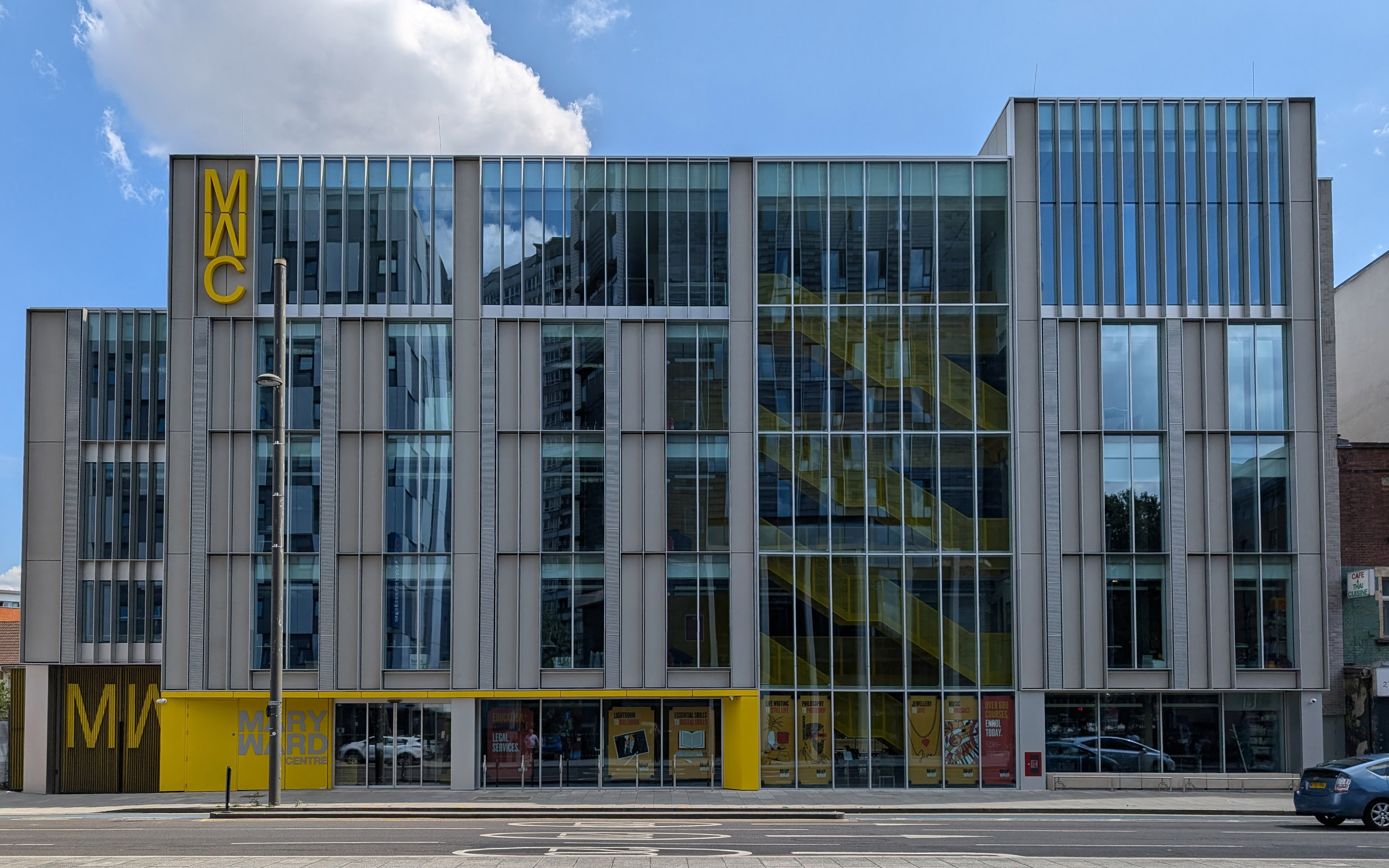
The Mary Ward Centre in Stratford

The Mary Ward Centre is an adult education college in Stratford, London.

== History ==
The centre was founded by Mary Augusta Ward, a Victorian novelist and founding president of the Women's National Anti-Suffrage League, better known by her married name Mrs Humphry Ward. The original name of the institution was the Passmore Edwards Settlement, as it was part of the settlement movement, and was financed by John Passmore Edwards. The settlement began in 1890 as University Hall, located in Gordon Square, Bloomsbury.

Its 1898 building – still named Mary Ward House – is located just off Tavistock Square, also in Bloomsbury. It was designed by Arnold Dunbar Smith and Cecil Claude Brewer and is listed at Grade I. It is considered to be a masterpiece of late Victorian architecture and one of the best Arts and Crafts buildings in London.

In a speech to mark the opening of the Settlement in 1898 Mary Ward stated its mission as: "education, social intercourse, and debate of the wider sort, music, books, pictures, travel". She added: "It is these that make life rich and animated, that ease the burden of it, that stand perpetually between a man and a woman and the darker, coarser temptations of our human road".

Over time the activities at the Settlement expanded to include fully equipped classrooms for children with disabilities, one of the first in England, pioneering the importance of play within children's education, the equivalent of an after school club, a youth club for teenagers and a centre for pre- and ante-natal advice, among many others. It was the site of the historic debate on women's suffrage between Millicent Garrett Fawcett and Mrs Humphry Ward in February 1909, when the host was decisively defeated. In 1920 Mary Ward died and the following year the Settlement was renamed as the Mary Ward Settlement in memory of her work. In addition to the educational centre, the organisation includes the Mary Ward Legal Centre.

The settlement was renamed the Mary Ward Centre in the 1970s. In 1982 it relocated to the Grade II listed 42–43 Queen Square, formerly the Stanhope Institute. The building and its attached cast-iron railings are listed at Grade II.

In late 2018, The Mary Ward Adult Education Centre announced in a letter to students its plans to move to new premises in Stratford, East London. In the letter, students were told that the organisation had purchased a new building in Queensway House on Stratford High Street, citing the "unaffordable" cost of its current location and the need for specialist educational provision in East London as factors influencing the decision to move.

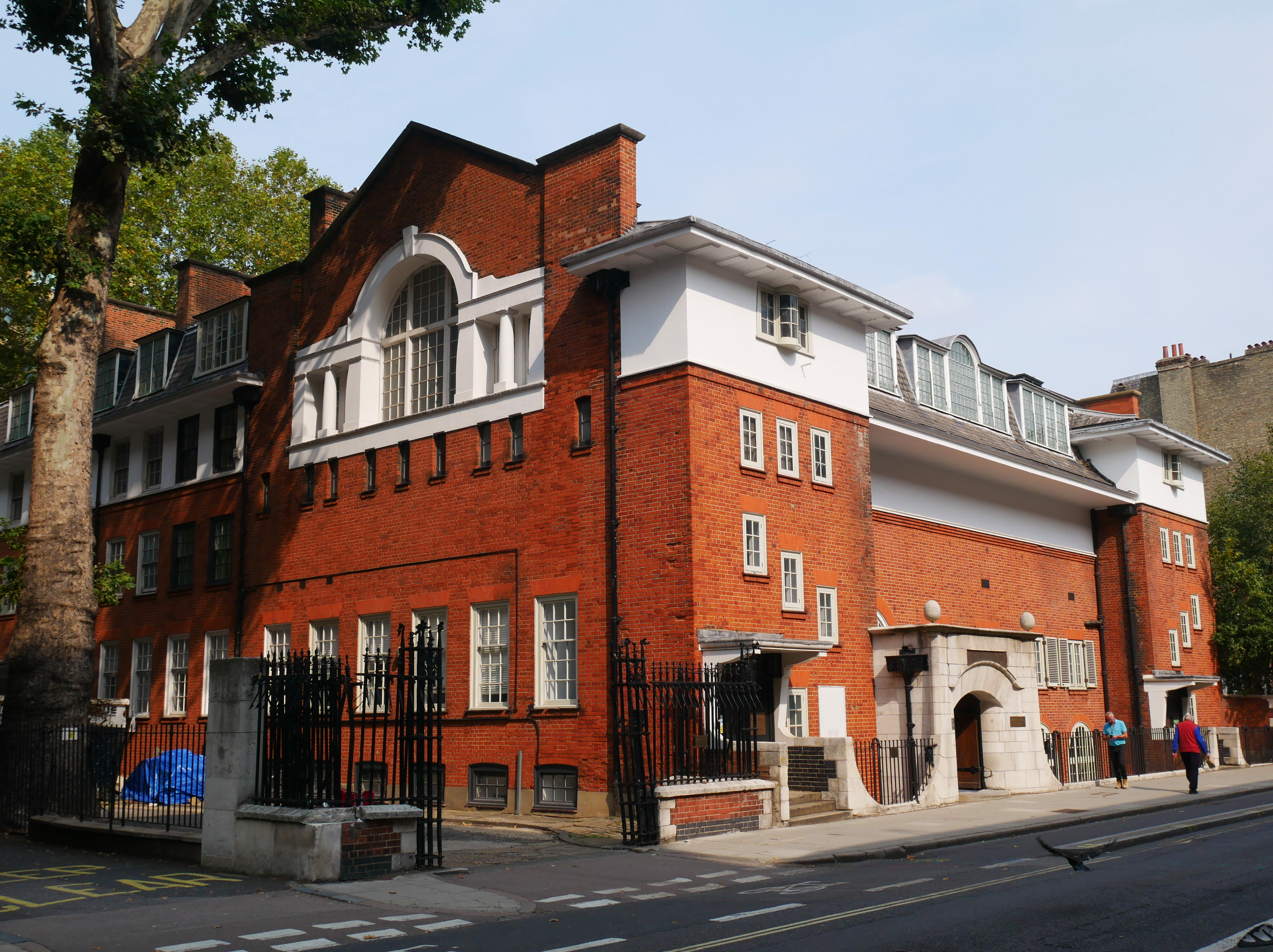
Mary Ward House, the organisation's home from 1898

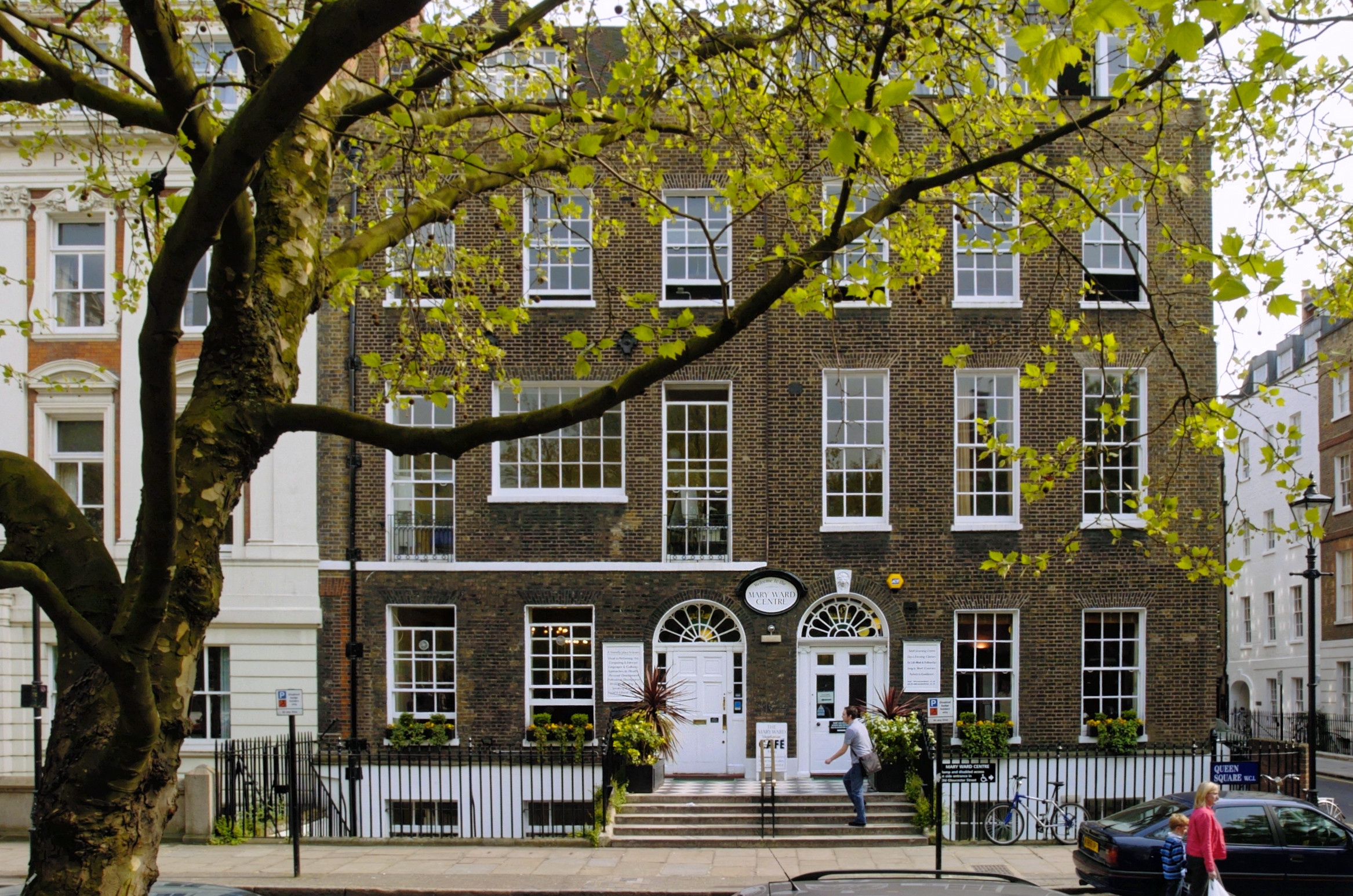
The centre's home from 1982 to 2023 in converted 18th-century houses at 42 Queen Square

== Present ==
Since September 2023 the Mary Ward Adult Education Centre has been based on Stratford High Street in East London.

The Mary Ward Legal Centre is based at 10 Great Turnstile in Holborn. The Mary Ward Legal Centre provides free, independent advice to people who live and work in London to help them access their legal rights and entitlements.

== Artworks ==
The Mary Ward Centre houses a portrait of John Passmore Edwards by Felix Moscheles. Also on display are two works by Marc Breen, Untitled and Rooftops of Queen Square, as well as a 1904 portrait in chalk of Mary Ward by Albert Sterner.

== See also ==
- Guild of Play
