= Heaton, Newcastle upon Tyne =

Suburb of Newcastle upon Tyne, England

Coordinates: 54.988°N 1.575°W

Heaton
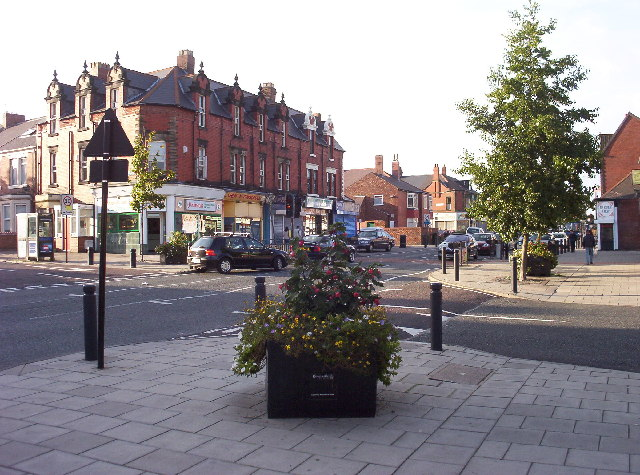
- Chillingham Road, Heaton's main commercial street

- Location within Tyne and Wear
- OS grid reference: NZ273660
  - London: 242 mi (389 km)
- Metropolitan borough: Newcastle upon Tyne
- Metropolitan county: Tyne and Wear
- Region: North East
- Country: England
- Sovereign state: United Kingdom
- Post town: NEWCASTLE UPON TYNE
- Postcode district: NE6-7
- Dialling code: 0191
- Police: Northumbria
- Fire: Tyne and Wear
- Ambulance: North East
- UK Parliament: Newcastle upon Tyne East and Wallsend
- Councillors: List of Councillors; Heaton: Lara Ellis (Labour) Clare Penny-Evans (Labour) John-Paul Stephenson (Labour); Manor Park: Matthew Folker (Liberal Democrat) Doreen Huddart (Liberal Democrat) Greg Stone (Liberal Democrat); Ouseburn: Alistair Chisholm (Labour) Paula Holland (Labour) Gareth Kane (Liberal Democrat)

Heaton is a district and suburb in the city of Newcastle upon Tyne, in Tyne and Wear, England, two miles (three kilometres) east of the city centre. It is bordered by the neighbouring areas of Walkergate to the east, Jesmond to the north west, Byker to the south, and Sandyford to the west. The name Heaton means high town, referring to the area "being situated on hills above the Ouseburn, a tributary of the River Tyne." The area is divided into South Heaton, and High Heaton, representing the north, respectively. For city council elections, the area is split between three wards: Heaton, Manor Park and Ouseburn. Until 1974 it was in Northumberland.

== History ==
In the 12th century Heaton became part of the Barony of Ellingham granted by Henry I to Nicholas de Grenville. King John is claimed to have stayed in the castle at Heaton (the remains of which can still be seen in Heaton Park) on a number of occasions. In the 17th century the Heaton estate was purchased by Henry Babington who was knighted at Heaton Hall by James I on 1 May 1617.

By the 18th century, Heaton was a coal mining area with many of its collieries owned by Matthew White and Richard Ridley, then by his son Matthew Ridley. The Heaton estate was broken up in 1835 when the area became part of Newcastle upon Tyne. In 1841 much of the land in Heaton was owned by Armorer Donkin, who on his death in 1851 bequeathed it to his business partner, the industrialist Sir William Armstrong.

The Municipal Corporations Act 1835 established Newcastle City Council and extended the boundaries of the city to include Elswick, Westgate, Jesmond, Heaton and Byker

In 1879, the corporation acquired part of the Heaton Hall estate, which was then laid out as Heaton Park, and Sir William Armstrong donated Armstrong Park and Jesmond Dene to the city. The three parks run into each other to form a green corridor through east Newcastle.

== Geography ==
A distinction is often made between High Heaton, and the rest of Heaton, although both technically fall within Heaton. The rest of Heaton is sometimes referred to as South Heaton, although the term has not been seen used in official city council documents.

Notable landmarks in Heaton include the Wills Building, which was originally constructed in 1946–1950 as a cigarette factory and was redeveloped in 1999 as luxury apartments.

== Governance ==
For the purposes of city council elections, Heaton was divided into two electoral wards, North Heaton and South Heaton.

However, boundary changes to all wards in Newcastle upon Tyne were implemented at the city council elections in May 2018, with the majority of Heaton now falling in the Heaton ward, and High Heaton in the Manor Park ward. A small part of Heaton, close to Shields Road, falls within the Ouseburn ward. All city council wards are represented by three councillors.

For Parliamentary elections, Heaton is within the Newcastle East constitutency.

Heaton was formerly a township in the parish of Newcastle-All Saints, in 1866 Heaton became a separate civil parish, on 1 April 1914 the parish was abolished to form Newcastle upon Tyne. In 1911 the parish had a population of 21,912. In 1974 it became part of the metropolitan district of Newcastle upon Tyne.

== Demography ==
Heaton is a mixed working class and middle class area. In recent years it has become a popular residence for many students attending the city's two universities, Newcastle University and Northumbria University. Rent and property prices are generally lower than in the neighbouring areas of Jesmond and Sandyford, but higher than in Byker.

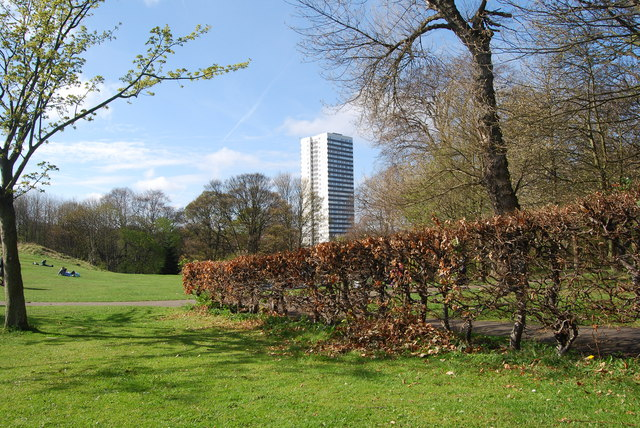
Flats seen from Heaton Park

== Economy ==
During the 19th century, the building of the railways saw a line pass through Heaton, now the East Coast Main Line. Heaton also has a major rail depot. Heaton became the location of Sir Charles Parsons engineering works producing turbines which was founded in 1889.

Third Avenue was the birthplace of the Ringtons Tea business.

The main commercial street in Heaton is Chillingham Road which benefits from local amenities including two small supermarkets, a number of small shops and newsagents, hairdressers, takeaways, cafes, restaurants and public houses. Heaton Road is also becoming a notable commercial street.

== Education ==
Heaton has a large secondary school, Heaton Manor School, recently renamed Jesmond Park Academy, although many children in Heaton attend Benfield School, located on the Heaton/Walkergate boundary. There are also a number of primary schools spread over the area: Ravenswood Primary School, Chillingham Road Primary School, Hotspur Primary School and St. Teresa's Primary School.

Despite austerity, Heaton retains an autism-friendly library in High Heaton with 3-hour computer access and a range of fiction and non-fiction books available.

In 1932, Henderson Hall was opened as halls of residence for Newcastle University.

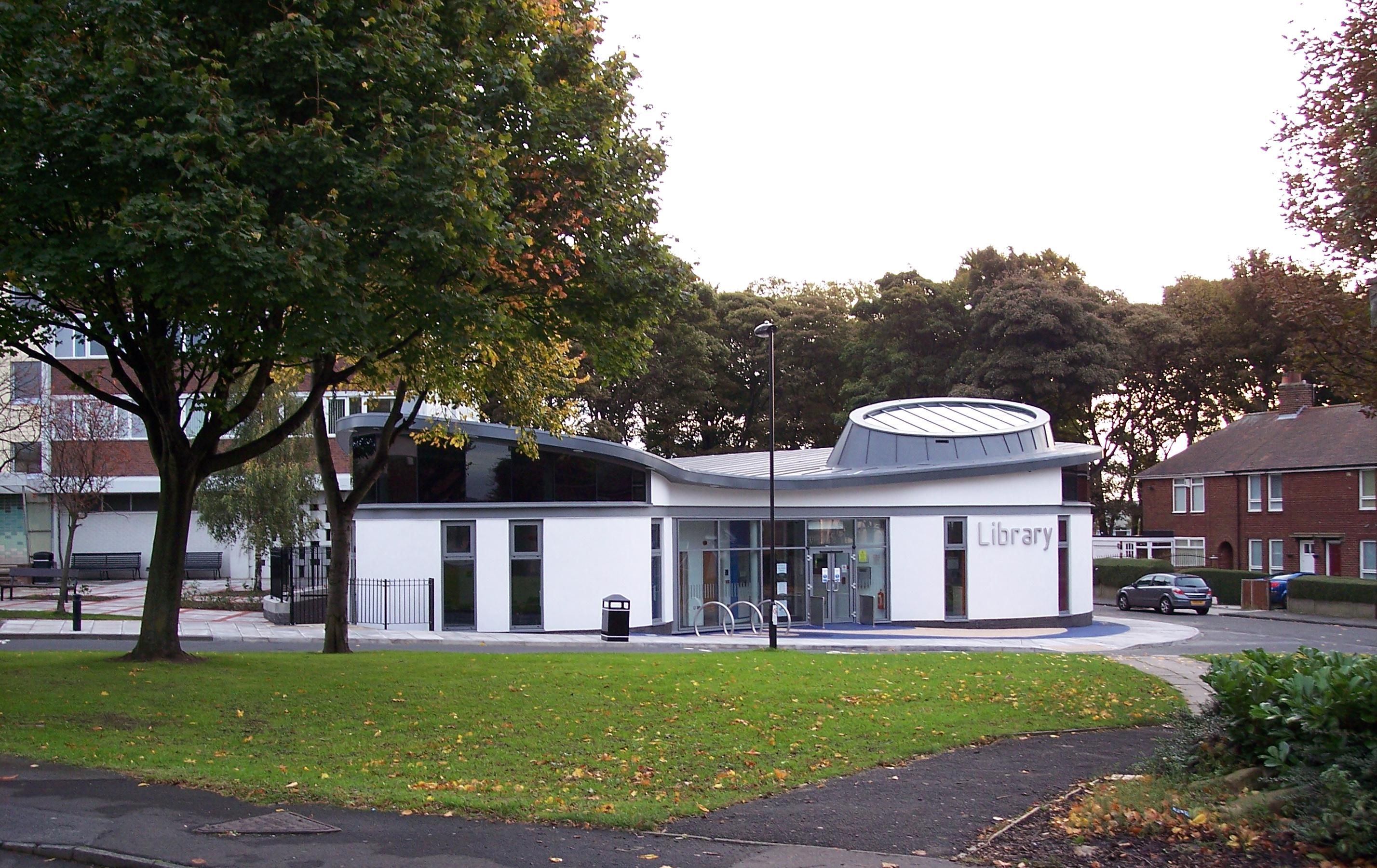
High Heaton Library

== Sport ==
Heaton was home to Newcastle United under their previous name, Newcastle East End F.C., between 1886 and 1892. East End played at the Heaton Junction Ground on Chillingham Road before moving to St James' Park.

Two Northern League football clubs play in areas neighboring Heaton. Heaton Stannington F.C. play in High Heaton, while Newcastle Benfield F.C. play next door to Benfield School.

Heaton is also home to amateur rugby football club Medicals RFC, based in Cartington Terrace.

== Religion ==
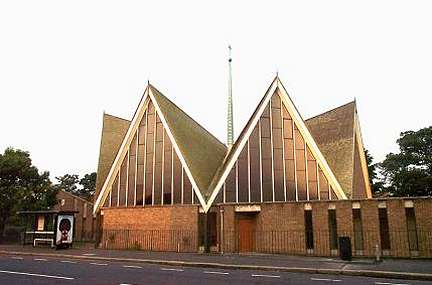
St Teresa's Church

Heaton is home to RC and CofE churches, and the Heaton Mosque and Islamic Centre.

== Transport ==
Heaton was originally served by Heaton railway station, which was on the main line from Newcastle Central to Edinburgh Waverley. The station was closed on 11 August 1980, when the Tyne & Wear Metro system opened. Heaton is now served by the Chillingham Road Metro station, and Byker Metro station which is closer for some in South Heaton. Heaton is also served by a variety of bus routes, including routes 1, 62 and 63, which link Heaton to Newcastle City Centre and areas in the west of Newcastle.

== Healthcare ==
Heaton Road Surgery was graded 'outstanding' in 2015 by the Care Quality Commission. The Freeman Hospital, Newcastle's second largest major hospital, is in High Heaton.

== Notable people ==
- Ove Arup (1895-1988), chief engineer of the Sydney Opera House, was born and raised in Heaton.
- Jack Common (1903–68), left-wing political scientist and sociologist, author of 'Kiddar's Luck' and 'The Ampersand', was born and brought up at Number 44 Third Avenue, Heaton and attended Chillingham Road Primary School; his novels give a vivid portrait of the area in the early 20th century. Common was later to model for the bust of Karl Marx that tops Marx's tomb in Highgate Cemetery, London.
- Chas Chandler (1938–96), bassist for The Animals and manager of the Jimi Hendrix Experience and Slade. It is reputed that Jimi Hendrix himself busked on Chillingham Road during his time living with Chas in Heaton at 35 Second Avenue.
- Chris Donald and Simon Donald, founders of Viz magazine, lived and attended school in Heaton.
- Cheryl Cole, former member of pop group Girls Aloud, was born in Heaton on 30 June 1983 and lived there until the mid-1990s when she moved to nearby Walker.

== Sources ==
- Charleton, Robert John (1899). A History of Newcastle upon Tyne from the earliest records to its formation as a city. London: Walter Scott Ltd.
- Colls, Robert; Lancaster, Bill (2001). Newcastle upon Tyne. A Modern History. Chichester: Phillimore & Co Ltd. ISBN 1-86077-167-X.
