= North Heaton =

- ward
- Location in Tyne and Wear
- Coordinates: 54.996°N 1.584°W
- OS grid reference: NZ266669
- Sovereign state: United Kingdom
- Country: England
- District: Tyne and Wear

North Heaton is a ward of Newcastle City Council in Newcastle upon Tyne, England. It covers the northern part of the Heaton district as well as High Heaton. The Ward population at the 2011 census was 9,574.

There are two schools in the area, Heaton Manor School and Ravenswood Primary School. The Coast Road which is the main traffic artery out of the east of the city runs through the ward.

The Ward is represented by 3 Councillors and as of 07/05/2015 the ward political composition is made up of 1 Labour and 2 Liberal Democrat Councillors.
