= Walkergate Metro station =

Tyne and Wear Metro station in Newcastle upon Tyne

Walkergate
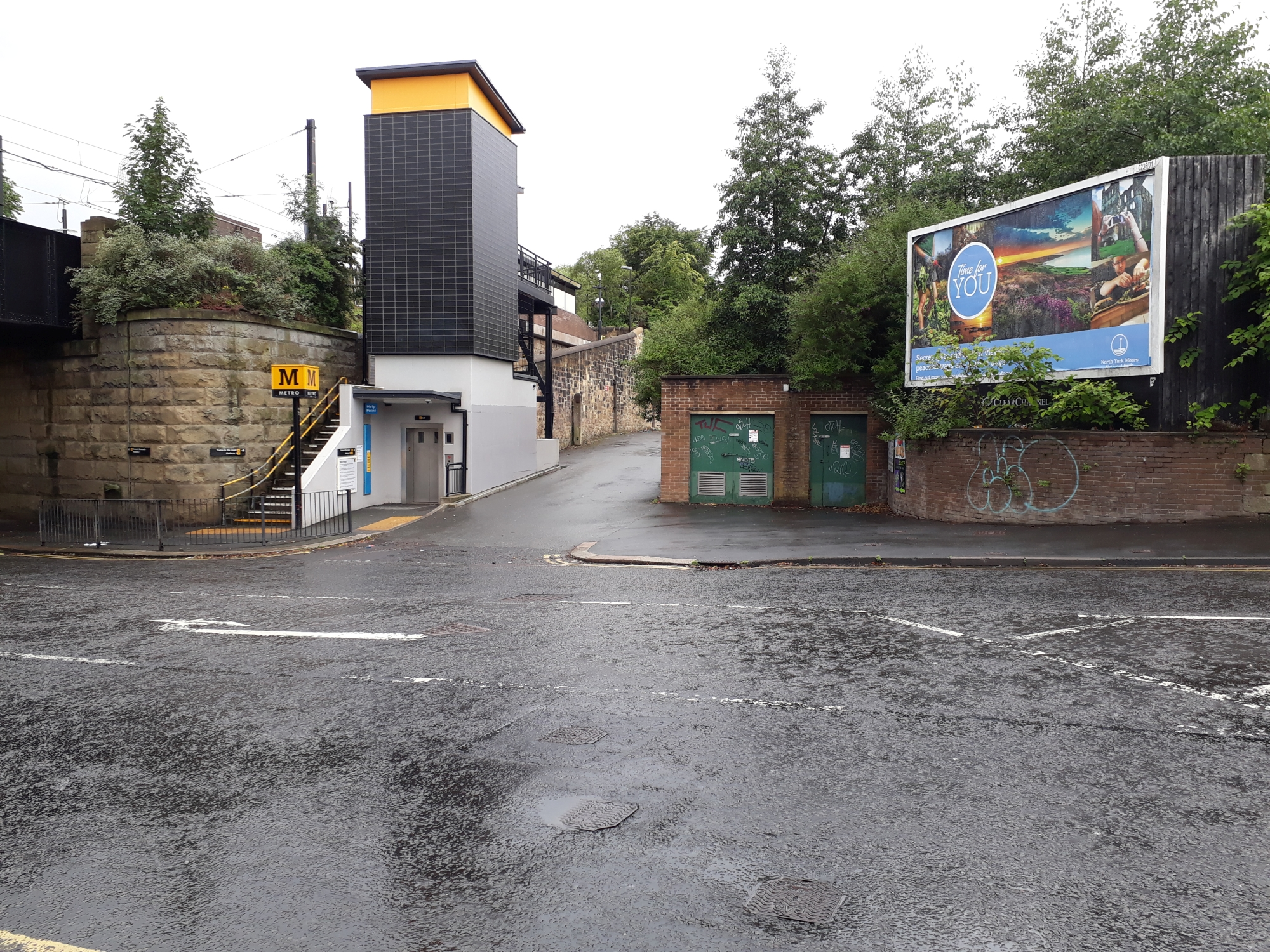

General information
- Location: Walkergate, Newcastle upon Tyne; England
- Coordinates: 54°59′07″N 1°33′34″W
- Grid reference: NZ282657
- System: Tyne and Wear Metro station
- Transit authority: Tyne and Wear PTE
- Platforms: 2
- Tracks: 2

Construction
- Parking: 24 spaces
- Cycle facilities: 3 cycle pods
- Accessible: Step-free access to platform

Other information
- Station code: WKG
- Fare zone: A and B

History
- Original company: Newcastle and North Shields Railway
- Pre-grouping: North Eastern Railway
- Post-grouping: London and North Eastern Railway; British Rail (Eastern Region)

Key dates
- 22 June 1839: Opened as Walker
- 1 April 1889: Renamed Walker Gate
- 11 August 1980: Closed for conversion
- 14 November 1982: Reopened as Walkergate

Passengers
- 2024/25: 0.476 million

Services
Preceding station	Tyne and Wear Metro	Following station
Wallsend towards South Shields via Whitley Bay	Yellow line	Chillingham Road towards St James
Location
- Location within Newcastle-upon-Tyne Location within Tyne and Wear

Walkergate is a Tyne and Wear Metro station, serving Walkergate, Newcastle upon Tyne in Tyne and Wear, England. It joined the network on 14 November 1982, following the opening of the fourth phase of the network, between Tynemouth and St James via Wallsend.

== History ==
The station was opened on 22 June 1839 by the Newcastle and North Shields Railway. This later became part of the North Tyneside Loop, served by the North Eastern Railway. The station was renamed Walker Gate in April 1889. In the days of British Rail, the station was known as both Walkergate and Walker Gate. The Tyne and Wear Metro, however, uses the single word form.

Following closure for conversion in the early 1980s, the station was demolished and re-built. The original North Eastern Railway footbridge was preserved, and is now located at Pickering station, on the North Yorkshire Moors Railway.

The station underwent modernisation work between September 2013 and July 2014, as part of the Metro: All Change programme. This involved improvements to accessibility (including the installation of a passenger lift), aesthetic changes, and the introduction of new smart ticket machines and validators.

== Facilities ==
Step-free access is available at all stations across the Tyne and Wear Metro network, with ramps providing step-free access to both platforms, as well as a lift providing step-free access to platform 1 (for trains towards Whitley Bay). The station is equipped with ticket machines, sheltered waiting area, seating, next train information displays, timetable posters, and an emergency help point on both platforms. Ticket machines are able to accept payment with credit and debit card (including contactless payment), notes and coins. The station is also fitted with smartcard validators, which feature at all stations across the network.

There is a small free car park available at the station, with 24 spaces. There is also the provision for cycle parking, with three cycle pods available for use.

== Services ==
As of April 2021, the station is served by up to five trains per hour on weekdays and Saturday, and up to four trains per hour during the evening and on Sunday.
