= Walker, Newcastle upon Tyne =

Suburb of Newcastle upon Tyne, England

Coordinates: 54.978°N 1.550°W

Walker
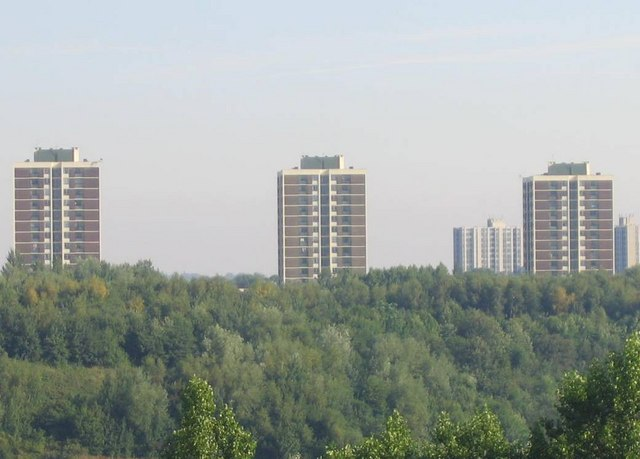
- Tower blocks in Walker

- Location within Tyne and Wear
- OS grid reference: NZ289648
  - London: 242 miles (389 km)
- Metropolitan borough: Newcastle upon Tyne
- Metropolitan county: Tyne and Wear
- Region: North East
- Country: England
- Sovereign state: United Kingdom
- Post town: NEWCASTLE UPON TYNE
- Postcode district: NE6
- Post town: WALLSEND
- Postcode district: NE28
- Dialling code: 0191
- Police: Northumbria
- Fire: Tyne and Wear
- Ambulance: North East
- UK Parliament: Newcastle upon Tyne East
- Councillors: John Stokel-Walker (Labour) David Wood (Labour) Margaret Wood (Labour)

Walker is a residential suburb and electoral ward in the south-east of Newcastle upon Tyne, in the county of Tyne and Wear, England.

== History ==
The place-name 'Walker' is first attested in 1242, where it appears as Waucre. This means 'wall-carr', that is to say, 'the marsh by the Roman wall', a reference to Hadrian's Wall. Today, a small fragment of the wall can be found in neighbouring Byker to the west, and Segedunum, a major site at the end of the Wall can be found in Wallsend to the east.

Walker was formerly a township and chapelry in the parish of Longbenton, on 30 September 1894 Walker became a separate civil parish from 1894 to 1904 Walker was urban district, on 1 April 1974 the parish was abolished. In 1951 the parish had a population of 32,346. In 1974 it became part of the metropolitan district of Newcastle upon Tyne.

=== Industry ===
Large-scale coal-mining began in the area in the early 1700s, with up to ten collieries in operation in the Walker area. A wagon-way was constructed during this period to facilitate transportation of coal to the riverside staithes. In 1769, two ventilators were in action at Walker Colliery 'by the help of the fire-engine' (a Newcomen atmospheric engine).

Walker used to have a large shipbuilding industry, particularly the yard of Armstrong Whitworth at High Walker, but this has declined over the past 50 years and the area has suffered as a result, with many jobs being taken away from the community.

In 1806, James Losh established an alkali works at Walker. From 1809 to 1883, Walker was home to an iron-making company, Losh, Wilson and Bell (known towards the end as Bells, Goodman and finally as Bells, Lightfoot).

== Walkerville ==
Walkerville was developed as a model housing exhibition along the lines of the Garden city movement held under the auspices of the National Housing Reform Council in 1908 and is an early example of small-scale town planning prior to the Housing, Town Planning, &c. Act 1909. One of the prime campaigners behind the exhibition was Councillor David Adams (1871-1943), who later became an MP and Lord Mayor of Newcastle. The chosen site was Corporation estate, Walker, and the gold medal for the horseshoe layout of the site was awarded to Watson and Scott of Newcastle. The exhibition was of a range of 'model cottages' for working people of different types from two to three bedrooms, by different architects and backed by a range of patrons including Wallsend Cooperative Society, at that time a provider of mortgage capital for its members. Newcastle Corporation also built homes as part of the exhibition. The Gold medal-winning architects were AT Martindale, White & Stephenson, Edward Cratney and TE Davidson. David Adams described the planning and development of the Walker and Willington estates in a series of articles for The Northern Echo.

== Description ==
Walker is an area between Welbeck Road and the banks of the River Tyne, although the modern electoral ward of Walker incorporates Pottery Bank and St Anthony's. When most Geordies refer to Walker they also incorporate the areas of Daisy Hill and Eastfield. Walkergate, located between Welbeck Road and the Network rail line are sometimes considered parts of Walker. Other parts of Walker are Walkerdene (which is situated south of 'Fossway' and north of 'Welbeck Road', west of 'Waverdale Avenue' and east of 'Scrogg Road') and Walkerville (which is located under the railway bridge and to the right, these houses are mainly private stock whereas other areas of Walker are council and ex-council stock). Other areas included are Daisy Hill and Eastfield which help make up the city Ward of Walkergate.

The area is notable for Walker Park, the Walker Riverside Park, and the Lady Stephenson Library (now known as 'Walker Library') as well as the Lightfoot Sports Centre, which is set to undergo a £2.5m refurbishment. Alderman Sir William Haswell Stephenson, built the library in 1908 in memory of his wife Eliza, who died in 1901. The library closed on 29 June 2013 and contents have been relocated into a purpose built area within Walker Activity Dome in July 2013 (The Lightfoot Sports Centre). Walker Park received a Green Flag Award in 2019.

Walker is served by the Tyne and Wear Metro, with a station at Walkergate, and has a main bus terminus on Walker Road, although this is quite dilapidated and badly serviced.

Most children attend a local primary school, These are St Vincent's RC, Tyneview, Welbeck Academy, West Walker, Walkergate, and Central Walker. The two main Secondary Schools which service the area are Benfield School, a specialist Sports College, and Walker Riverside Academy, a high performing specialist technology and visual arts school for 11- to 18-year-olds.

== Future ==
Newcastle City Council's Walker Riverside regeneration scheme launched in 2003 aims to revitalise the area with new houses, schools, jobs and community facilities, environmental improvements, and a new neighbourhood centre to be known as the Heart of Walker. The scheme has its own newsletter known as the "Walker Eye", which goes to almost 7,000 homes and businesses locally.

Much of the older and run-down housing stock along Walker Road is in the process of being demolished and replaced with new homes which are a mixture of council and private housing. The stated aim was to build 1,600 new and replacement homes over a 15-year period.

As part of the new Heart of Walker development, plans have recently been unveiled to open a new state-of-the-art primary school on a site next door to the redeveloped Lightfoot Centre, where the old Wharrier Street Primary School was. The £7.5m project merged Wharrier Street and St Anthony's Primary Schools in Autumn 2012 to create the new Central Walker Church of England Primary.

Plans for the area's regeneration were approved by the then Secretary of State for Communities and Local Government, Ruth Kelly.

In August 2018 it was announced that two high-rise blocks, Titan House and Hexham House were to be demolished. The flats and neighbouring Church Walk shopping centre will be replaced by a new housing development and shops.

== Notable people ==
Cheryl Cole, singer, born on 30 June 1983, lived in Walker and Heaton, attending Walker Comprehensive School, Middle Street, before she found fame with Girls Aloud.

Walker is the birthplace of Eric Burdon, lead singer of The Animals, who later recorded with War at the beginning of that band's career. The Animals recorded a song called "Gonna Send You Back to Walker", a repurposed version of a song by American R&B singer Timmy Shaw, "Gonna Send You Back to Georgia (A City Slick)".

Another Walkerite, the author, journalist and broadcaster Keith Topping, titled one of the chapters in his novel The Hollow Men, The St. Anthony's Chinese Takeaway Massacre. The novelist is co author on Dr Who: The Hollow Men (1998) with Martin Day.

FA Cup-winning Newcastle United defender, Charlie Crowe, was born in Walker.The former Newcastle United striker Shola Ameobi grew up in Walker, where he played for Walker Central F.C.; which was launched in 1988 by the Wallsend-born former Newcastle United footballer Lee Clark, and ex-club scout Brian Clark (no relation).

Stan Anderson, rugby union player who made one Test match appearance for England in the 1899 Home Nations Championship.

David MacBeth, an English pop music singer was born in Walker. Despite releasing a string of singles on three record labels between 1959 and 1969, MacBeth's only chart success was with his version of "Mr. Blue", which peaked at number 18 in the UK Singles Chart. MacBeth took part in the 1963 Roy Orbison/The Beatles Tour.

Geordie Shore stars Marty McKenna and Chantelle Conelly are both also from Walker.

== Sources ==
- Smailes, AE (1960). North England. Edinburgh: Thomas Nelson & Sons Ltd.
- Atkinson, Frank (1979). The Great Northern Coalfield 1700-1900. Newcastle upon Tyne: Frank Graham. ISBN 0 85983 121 3.
