= Guild of Play =

Historical girls' education initiative

The Guild of Play was founded by Dame Grace Kimmins (1871–1954) and others from the Passmore Edwards Settlement to provide structured play for city girls.

== Objective ==
To provide a civilising influence away from the city streets by reviving the old Merrie England idealised lifestyle.

== Related organisations ==
- The Bermondsey Settlement
- The Chailey Heritage
- The Guild of the Poor Brave Things
- The Passmore Edwards Settlement

== Related people of influence ==
- John Passmore Edwards
- Millicent Garrett Fawcett
- Hugh Price Hughes and wife Katherine
- Lord Llangattock
- Mary Neal
- Emmeline Pethick-Lawrence (sometimes written Emmeline Pethick, or with the hyphen omitted)
- Mary Ward
- Brian Kimmins
