= Sandyford, Newcastle upon Tyne =

District in Newcastle upon Tyne, England

Sandyford
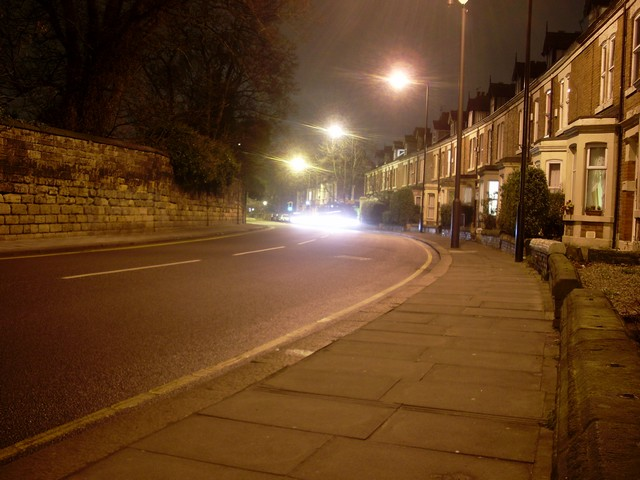
- Sandyford Road, the north-west boundary of Sandyford (on the right)
- OS grid reference: NZ257658
- Metropolitan borough: Newcastle upon Tyne
- Metropolitan county: Tyne and Wear
- Region: North East
- Country: England
- Sovereign state: United Kingdom
- Post town: NEWCASTLE UPON TYNE
- Postcode district: NE2; NE7
- Dialling code: 0191
- Police: Northumbria
- Fire: Tyne and Wear
- Ambulance: North East
- UK Parliament: Newcastle upon Tyne North
- Councillors: Arlene Ainsley (Labour) Felicity Mendelson (Labour) Judy Pearce (Labour)

Sandyford is a small district in central Newcastle upon Tyne. It represents the north-eastern border of central Newcastle, with the suburbs of Jesmond to the north and Heaton to the east.

== Population ==
Similarly to neighbouring Jesmond, Sandyford is home to a large number of students because of its close proximity to Newcastle University and Northumbria University.

== Architecture ==
Sandyford's housing stock is mostly red brick Victorian terraced housing, and many of these are Tyneside flats. Towards the south-east, the residential streets run steeply downwards to Jesmond Dene.

In the south of Sandyford, there are some light industrial business buildings, including offices and small warehouses.

== Transport ==
Sandyford is serviced by the Tyne and Wear Metro, with the nearest station being Jesmond Metro station.
