= Mary Ward House =

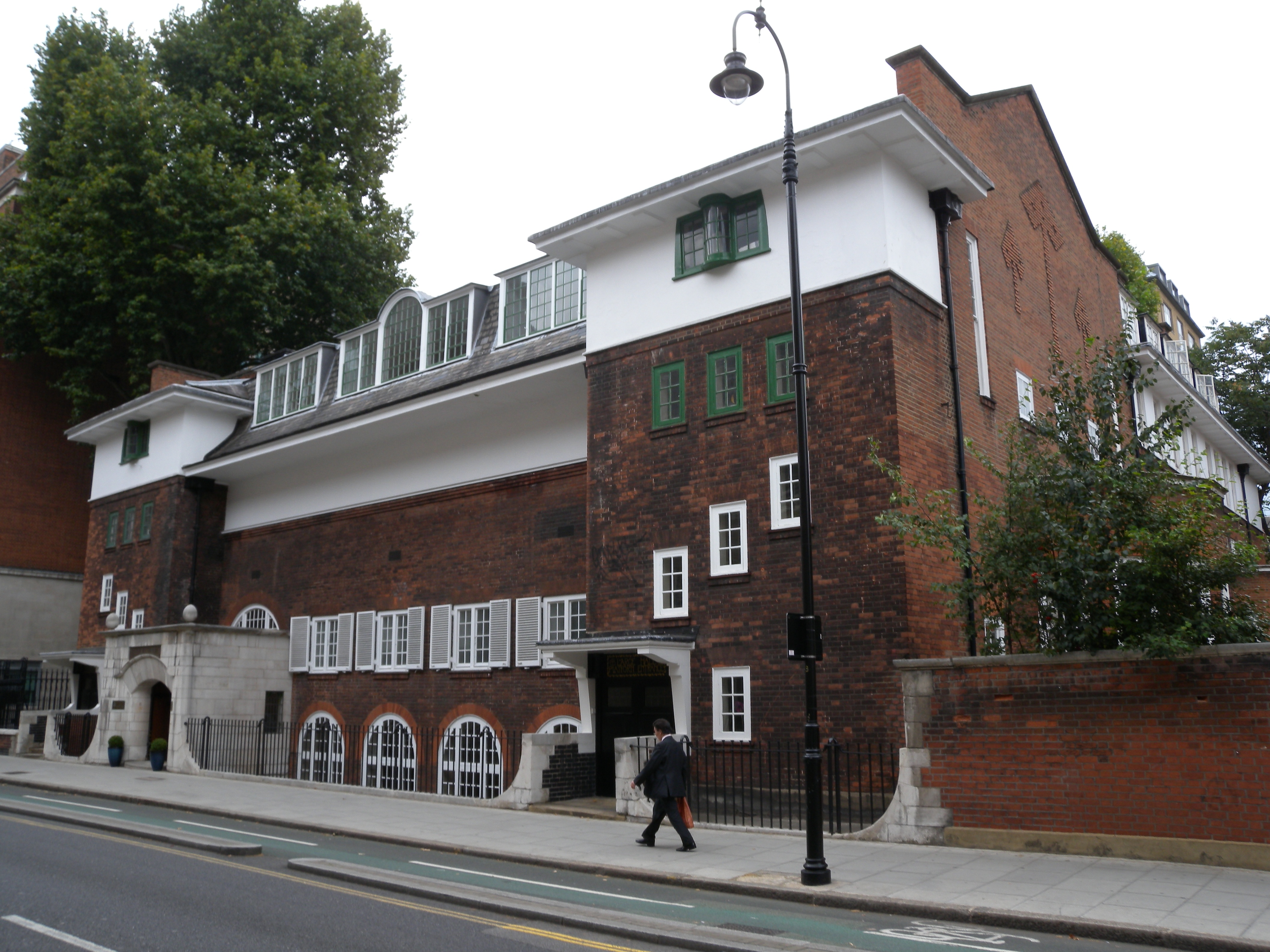
- Mary Ward House, as viewed from Tavistock Place

General information
- Type: Conference centre
- Architectural style: Arts and Crafts
- Location: 5-7 Tavistock Place, Bloomsbury; London, WC1H 9SN, United Kingdom
- Coordinates: 51.525207°N 0.127383°W
- Construction started: 1896; 130 years ago
- Completed: 1898; 128 years ago

Website
- https://www.marywardhouse.com

Mary Ward House is a listed building and conference centre in Bloomsbury, in London, England. It was the headquarters of the National Institute for Social Work Training, part of the settlement movement. Built between 1896 and 1898, the building is located on Tavistock Place, between Tavistock Square and Marchmont Street.

The building was listed on 7 April 1960 under the name 'The National Institute for Social Work Training and Attached Railings and Gates'. It is named after Mary Augusta Ward, who part-funded the building (most of the funding coming from Passmore Edwards). The building was designed by Arnold Dunbar Smith and Cecil Claude Brewer and is considered to be a masterpiece of late Victorian architecture and is considered to be one of the best Arts and Crafts buildings in London. It is also a Grade I listed building.

It is not to be confused with the current Mary Ward Centre building. The Mary Ward Centre was once based at 5-7 Tavistock Place, but moved to nearby Queen Square and also named its new building after Mary Ward, and later moved to Stratford.
