= Benfield School =

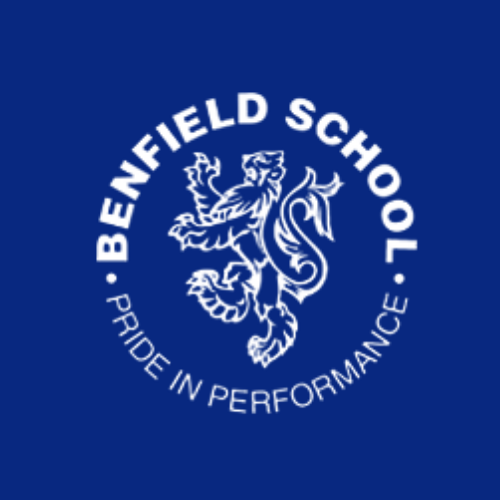

Location
- Benfield Road; Walkergate; Newcastle upon Tyne, Tyne and Wear, NE6 4NU; England
- 54.98991°N 1.55936°W

Information
- Type: Academy
- Motto: Growing leaders, Inspiring the extraordinary
- Established: 1967
- Local authority: Newcastle City Council
- Trust: NEAT Academy Trust
- Department for Education URN: 108526 Tables
- Ofsted: Reports
- Headteacher: Anthony Martin
- Gender: Coeducational
- Age: 11 to 18
- Enrolment: 969
- Colour: Blue
- Website: www.benfield-school.co.uk

Benfield School is a coeducational secondary school located in Walkergate, Newcastle upon Tyne, England.

Its pupils come from a large area of Newcastle's East and West ends including Byker, Heaton, Walker, Walkergate, Benwell and other areas of Newcastle Upon Tyne.

Benfield was first opened in 1967 as one of the first purpose-built comprehensive schools in England, and over the years has built up a reputation as a sports college. The school is also the North of England gymnastics centre and has all-weather floodlit football, rugby and basketball pitches, badminton courts along with ordinary pitches, tennis courts and a swimming pool.

Previously a foundation school administered by Newcastle City Council, in May 2017 Benfield School converted to academy status. The school is now sponsored by the NEAT Academy Trust.

== Facilities ==
Benfield School is renowned locally and regionally for its sport and creative arts facilities. Below are a number of examples of the facilities available at the school to students and the community:-

- Swimming Pool - 20m x 9m Swimming Pool with swimming a part of the curriculum offer for students.
- Floodlit 3G Pitch - which supports the work of the Benfield Elite Football Academy.
- Gymnastics Centre - 2,336 square meters of floor gymnastics space.
- Staged Drama and Dance Studio - a versatile performance space with light rigging in place with two fixed stages.

== Alumni ==
- Steve Bruce, former Newcastle United Football Manager (2019-2021) and former footballer
- Lee Clark, English football manager and former footballer
- Lee Hall, English playwright and screenwriter most famous for his Academy Award-nominated screenplay for the 1999 film Billy Elliot. Hall also wrote the screenplay for the 2019 biopic Rocketman which documents the life of Sir Elton John. His lyrics appear on Elton John's 2004 album Peachtree Road which includes 'The Letter', 'Electricity' and 'Merry Christmas Maggie Thatcher'.
- Vineeta Rishi, actress known for starring in Line of Duty, Doctor Who and Holby City
