= Henderson Hall, Newcastle =

Henderson Hall
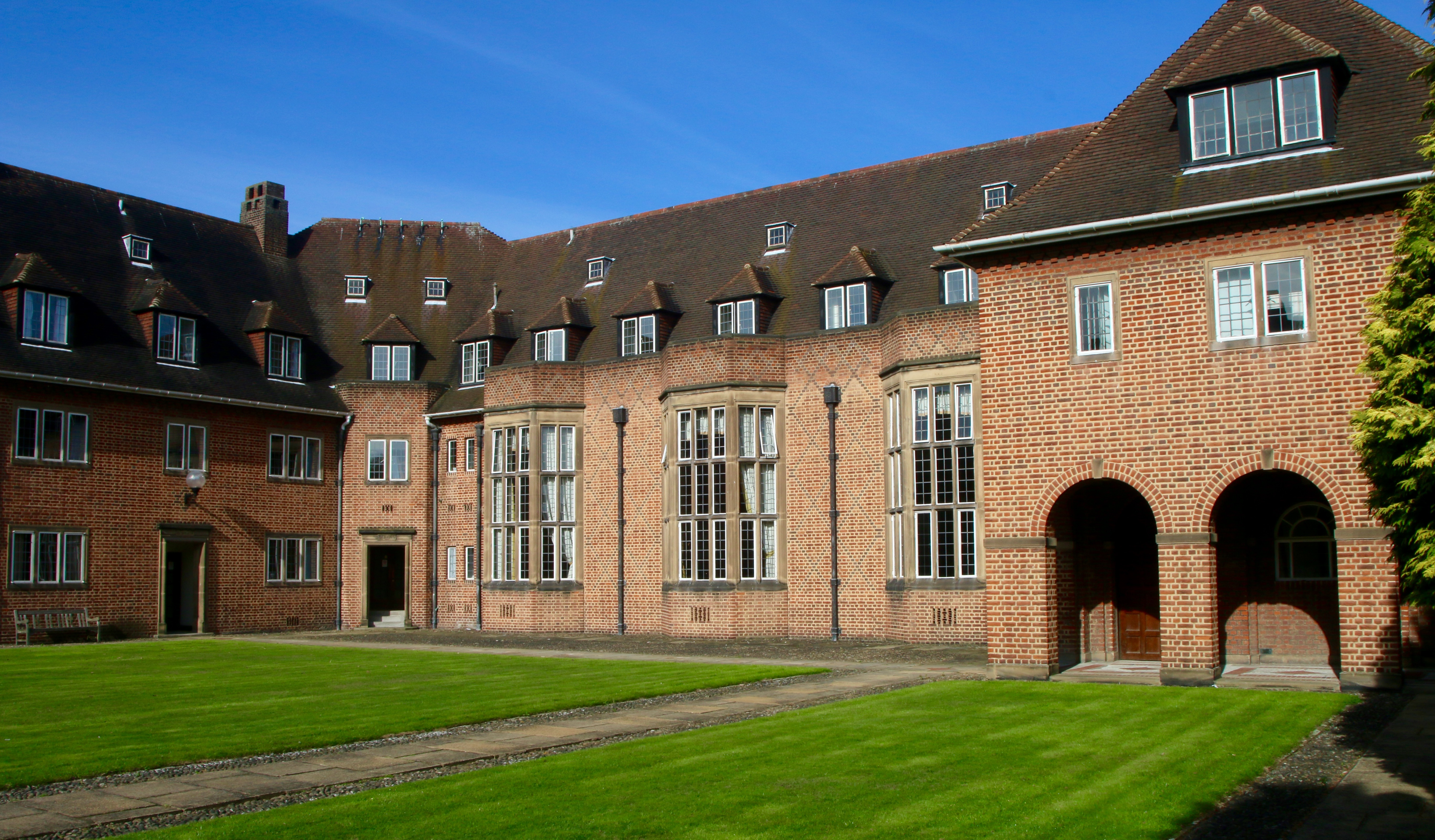
- Henderson Hall in 2015
- Interactive map of the Henderson Hall area

General information
- Architectural style: Neo-vernacular
- Location: Heaton, Newcastle upon Tyne, England
- Coordinates: 54.998377°N 1.572616°W
- Year built: 1929–1932
- Owner: Newcastle University

Design and construction
- Architect: Arnold Dunbar Smith
- Architecture firm: Smith and Brewer
- Designations: Grade II listed

Henderson Hall is a historic Grade II listed building in Heaton, Newcastle upon Tyne, England. The building was previously a hall of residence for Newcastle University. It was badly damaged by a major fire in 2023.

== History ==
The hall was designed by architect Arnold Dunbar Smith of Smith and Brewer in a neo-vernacular style and built between 1929 and 1932. It opened in 1932 as the first hall of residence for men at Durham University's Armstrong College in Newcastle (now Newcastle University), and was named Henderson Hall in 1935 after local philanthropist George Henderson who had donated the funds for its construction.

Notable residents of the hall included comedian Rowan Atkinson and musician Bryan Ferry. Atkinson used to perform amateur dramatics there, playing a grumpy old man in a raincoat. He was also interested in showing films in the hall's cinema. It was the subject of a book, Basil's Boys: Student Memories of Henderson Hall in 2010, taking its name from Basil Edward Quartermaine Smith who was warden from 1957 to 1981.

On 26 June 1996, the hall was designated a Grade II listed building on the National Heritage List for England by The Historic Buildings and Monuments Commission for England as "a very well preserved example of the more traditional type of student residence". By 2023, the halls had been "empty for a few years".

On 8 June 2023, a large fire started in the loft of the building, which was vacant at the time. It took over 50 firefighters and ten fire engines to control the fire over several hours. The building suffered extensive damage to the roof. Two teenage boys subsequently admitted arson and were sentenced in February 2024.

Restoration works to repair the hall were approved in November 2025, with work expected to start in early 2026 and last for up to 14 months.
