= Pottery Bank =

District of Walker, Newcastle upon Tyne, England

Pottery Bank is a district of Walker, Newcastle upon Tyne, England, south of Walker Road to the River Tyne between Church Street and Everstone Gardens.
