= Walkergate =

Coordinates: 54.984°N 1.559°W

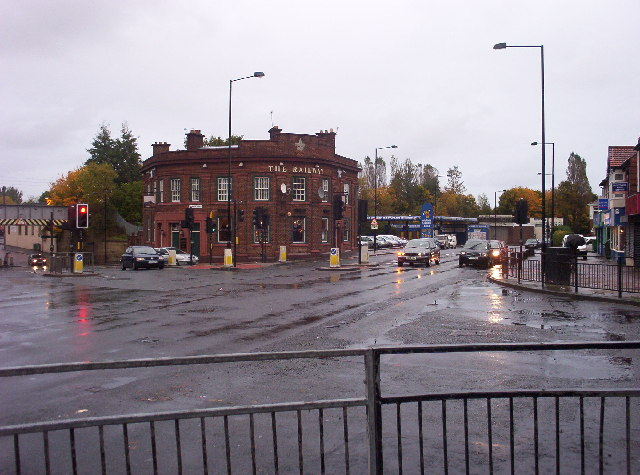
- Walkergate Crossroads

- Walkergate highlighted within Newcastle upon Tyne
- OS grid reference: NZ283655
  - London: 242 miles (389 km)
- Metropolitan borough: Newcastle upon Tyne
- Metropolitan county: Tyne and Wear
- Region: North East
- Country: England
- Sovereign state: United Kingdom
- Post town: NEWCASTLE UPON TYNE
- Postcode district: NE6
- Dialling code: 0191
- Police: Northumbria
- Fire: Tyne and Wear
- Ambulance: North East
- UK Parliament: Newcastle upon Tyne East
- Councillors: Stephen Lowrey (Reform UK) Gavin Maw (Reform UK) David Orr (Reform UK)

Walkergate is an area and electoral ward in the city of Newcastle upon Tyne, in the county of Tyne and Wear, England. It is in the east of the city, north of Walker proper, east of the Heaton area and west of Wallsend. Areas within the Walkergate ward include Daisy Hill, Eastfield, Walkerdene and Walkerville. Walkergate Metro station which was opened in 1982 serves the area. This replaced the previous railway station on the same site which was originally known as Walker station from 1839 to 1889 when it was renamed Walker Gate station.

Walkergate Hospital was built in 1888 originally as a hospital for Infectious Diseases - scarlet fever, diphtheria, typhoid, tuberculosis and later, polio. The architect was A.B. Gibson. The hospital was closed in 2011. In 2012 the Benfield Park Healthcare and Diagnostic Centre was opened on the site of the old Walkergate Hospital. The centre offers GP services, hospital clinics and a pharmacy.

Schools within the Walkergate ward area include Walkergate Community School, Benfield School and Walker Riverside Academy.

== Transport ==
Walkergate is home to Stagecoach in Newcastle’s Walkergate Depot, which primarily stores double-decker buses such as the ADL Enviro 400 and the ADL Enviro 400 MMC. Walkergate is also served by a Tyne & Wear Metro station, which is on the Yellow Line and sees trains to South Shields via The Coast and Newcastle City Centre on Platform 1 and St James on Platform 2. There are also frequent bus services running through the area, primarily operated by Stagecoach in Newcastle.

== Demographics ==
At the 2001 census, there were 9,745 people in Walkergate, reducing to 9,463 at the 2011 Census, making up 3.8% of the city's population.
