= Andrews Liver Salts =

Medication first sold in 1894

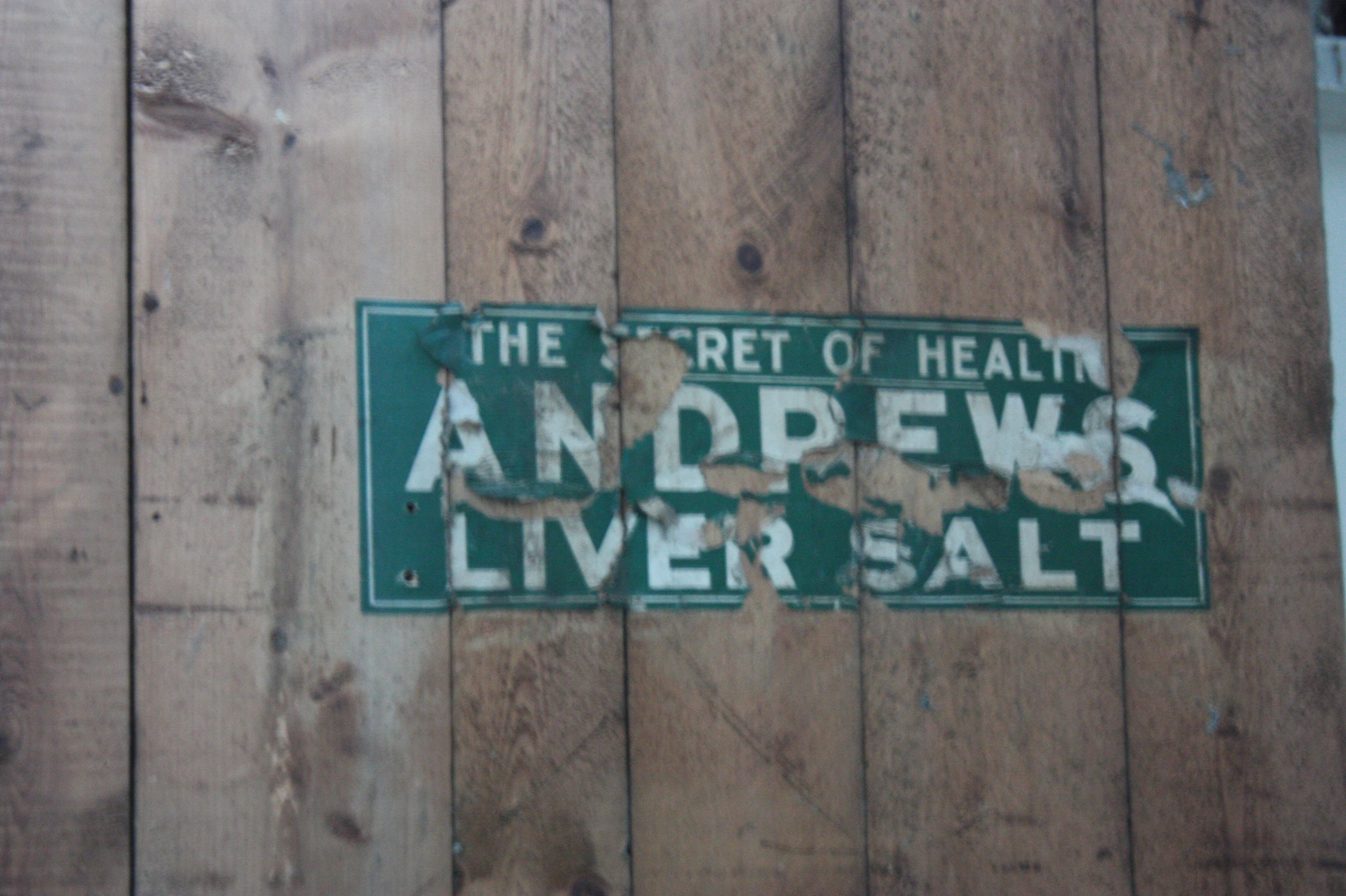
An old poster for Andrews Liver Salts, Constitution Street, Leith

Andrews Liver Salts was a laxative and antacid for mild stomach complaints. It was sold as a powder which is added to water and mixed, creating effervescence, before being swallowed.

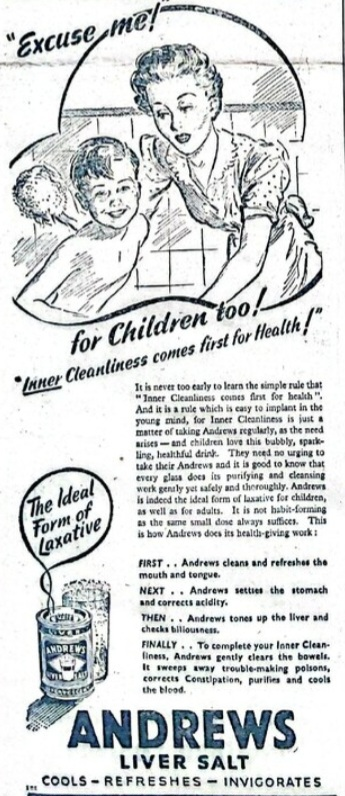
Advertisement from 1948

The powder contained sugar; an antacid, sodium bicarbonate (22.6% w/w); citric acid (to provide effervescence) (19.5% w/w); and a laxative, magnesium sulphate (17.4% w/w). The product was similar to Eno's salts although, lacking magnesium sulphate (Epsom Salts), these have no laxative effect. Kruschen salts are nearer and are a mild form of Epsom salts. The term "liver salts" or "health salts" is typically used for a laxative.

== History ==
Andrews Liver Salts was first sold from 1894, by William Henry Scott and William Murdoch Turner. Their business in the north-east of England originally imported margarine in the 1870s and 1880s. Their offices were in Gallowgate, Newcastle upon Tyne, and the product was named after St Andrew's church nearby. The trademark "Andrews Liver Salt" was registered in 1909. From the 1930s, promotional materials recommended taking the salts for "inner cleanliness".

In 1960, Scott and Turner's company merged with Charles Phillips, manufacturers of milk of magnesia, to become Phillips, Scott & Turner. The merged company was acquired by Frederick Stearns & Co, a subsidiary of Sterling Drug, in 1923, and acquired by SmithKline Beecham in 1995. Haleon, the successor to SmithKline Beecham, ceased production of Andrews Liver Salts in November 2023. No official explanation has been given for the end of production. Andrews always printed the exact composition of the ingredients on the back of their packaging: 17.4% Magnesium Sulphate MgSO₄ (Epsom Salts); 22.6% Sodium Hydrogen Carbonate NaHCO₃ (baking soda); 19.5% Citric Acid C₆H₈O₇; and 40.5% Sucrose C₁₂H₂₂O₁₁ (sugar).

== Cultural references ==
Andrews Liver Salts were widely advertised and, as a relatively rich company, could often afford large billboards. As such, the brand appears incidentally within many British movies, such as the chase scene in the film Brighton Rock.

The protagonist in Albert Camus's novel The Stranger clips out an advertisement for Kruschen Salts.
