= Arnold Dunbar Smith =

British architect (1866–1933)

Arnold Dunbar Smith FRIBA
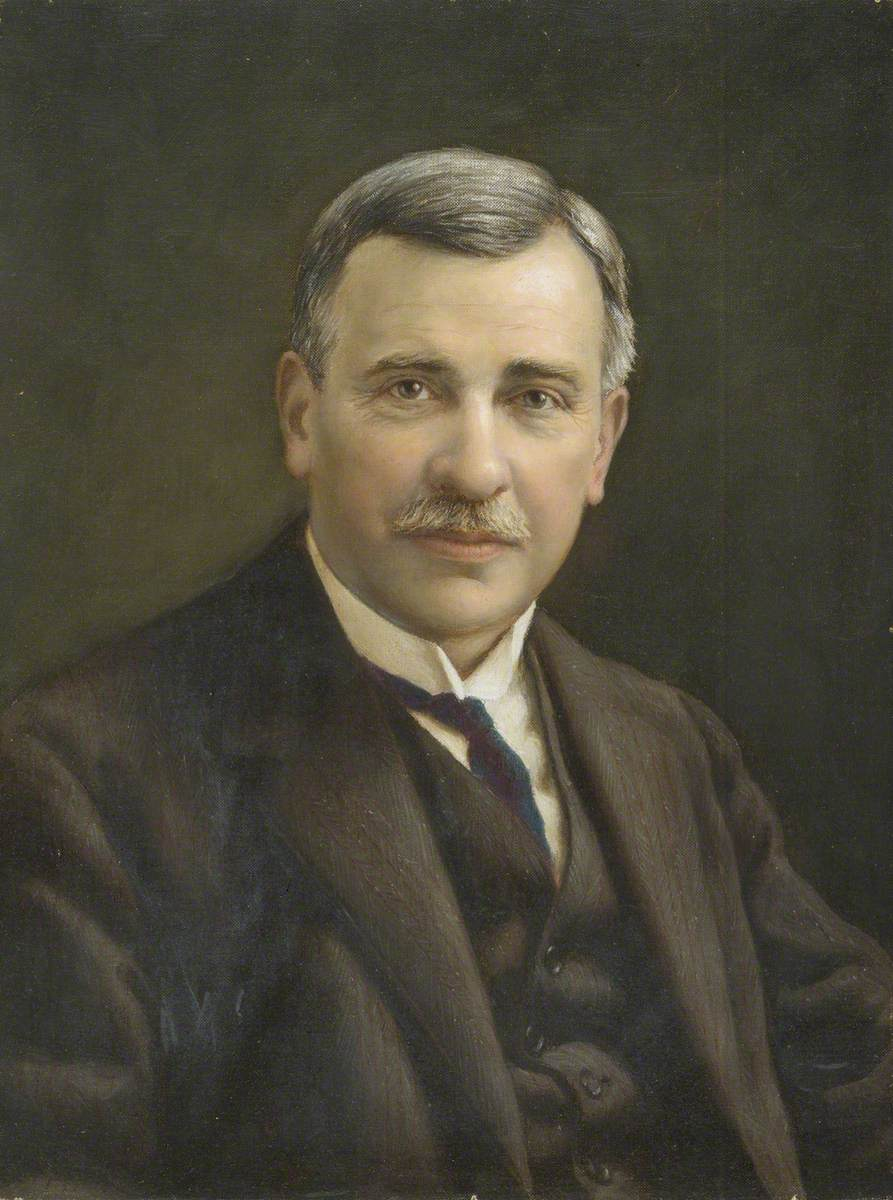
- Portrait of Arnold Dunbar Smith in the National Museum Cardiff
- Born: 2 December 1866; Islington, London, England
- Died: 7 December 1933 (aged 67); Bournemouth, England
- Occupation: Architect
- Practice: Smith & Brewer (1897 – 1949)
- Buildings: Mary Ward House (London); National Museum and Gallery (Cardiff)

Arnold Dunbar Smith FRIBA (2 December 1866 – 7 December 1933) was an English architect who in 1897 formed Smith & Brewer (1897 – 1949) with Cecil Claude Brewer (1871 – 1918) who were responsible for the design of the Mary Ward House in London (1899) and the National Museum and Gallery in Cardiff (1912) which are both Grade I listed buildings.

== Early life and education ==
Smith was born on 2 December 1866 in Islington, north London, England. Smith attended the Brighton School of Art, the Architectural Association School and later went onto the Royal Academy Schools.

== Professional career ==
In 1883 Smith was an apprentice to John George Gibbins in Brighton then later between 1884 and 1896 he went onto work as an assistant for a number of other architects including Frederick Mew, and to Frank (Francis) Thomas Baggallay & Walter John Nash Millard. He also travelled in France, Belgium, Germany and Switzerland and before he started his independent practice in 1895. By 1895 Smith and Cecil Claude Brewer (1871 – 1918) had won a limited competition for the design of a new building for the settlement in for the Passmore Edwards Settlement in Tavistock Place, London. Later in 1897 the two men had formed the Smith & Brewer partnership. Both men were members of the Art Workers' Guild. Brewer was elected in 1901 while Smith was elected in c1922. Brewer was also on the Art Workers Guild Committee from 1906 to 1907 and was one of the founding leaders of the Design and Industries Association.

The Passmore Edwards Settlement building established the partnership's reputation as arts and crafts architects working in the "Free Style" of the 1890s. The partnership designed mainly for the residential houses, such as The Fives Court, in Pinner. That was until 1909 when again they won a design competition, this time to design the National Museum of Wales building in Cathays Park, Cardiff. The conditions of competition had the following guidelines:

"From the position of the site on the east side of the City Hall and the relation of the Law Courts on its west side, to that building as a centre, it is thought desirable that externally the Museum building should be designed in harmony with these buildings, that, so far as possible, it may be in sympathy with the general scheme adopted."

The partnership worked with the Welsh sculptor Sir William Goscombe John (1860–1952) to design the sculptures that would decorate the building. They became pioneers of the Neo-Classical Revival with this building, and it played an important role in establishing the American Beaux-Arts style of classicism in the United Kingdom.

Later in 1916 they designed Heal's furniture store in Tottenham Court Road in London (1916). After Cecil Brewer's death in 1918, Smith continued the work and he designed many residential houses as well as additions to the Fitzwilliam Museum (1924–1933). In 1930, Joseph Abraham Meikle (1876–1942) and Kenneth William Furneaux Harris (1902–1991) became partners under the firm name of A. Dunbar Smith. After Smith's death in 1933, Meikle, Harris and Sidney Charles Clark (1894–1962) continued the work under the original partnership's name of Smith and Brewer. The firm ended with the death of Clark in 1949.

== Significant buildings by Smith and Brewer ==
Grade I listed buildings
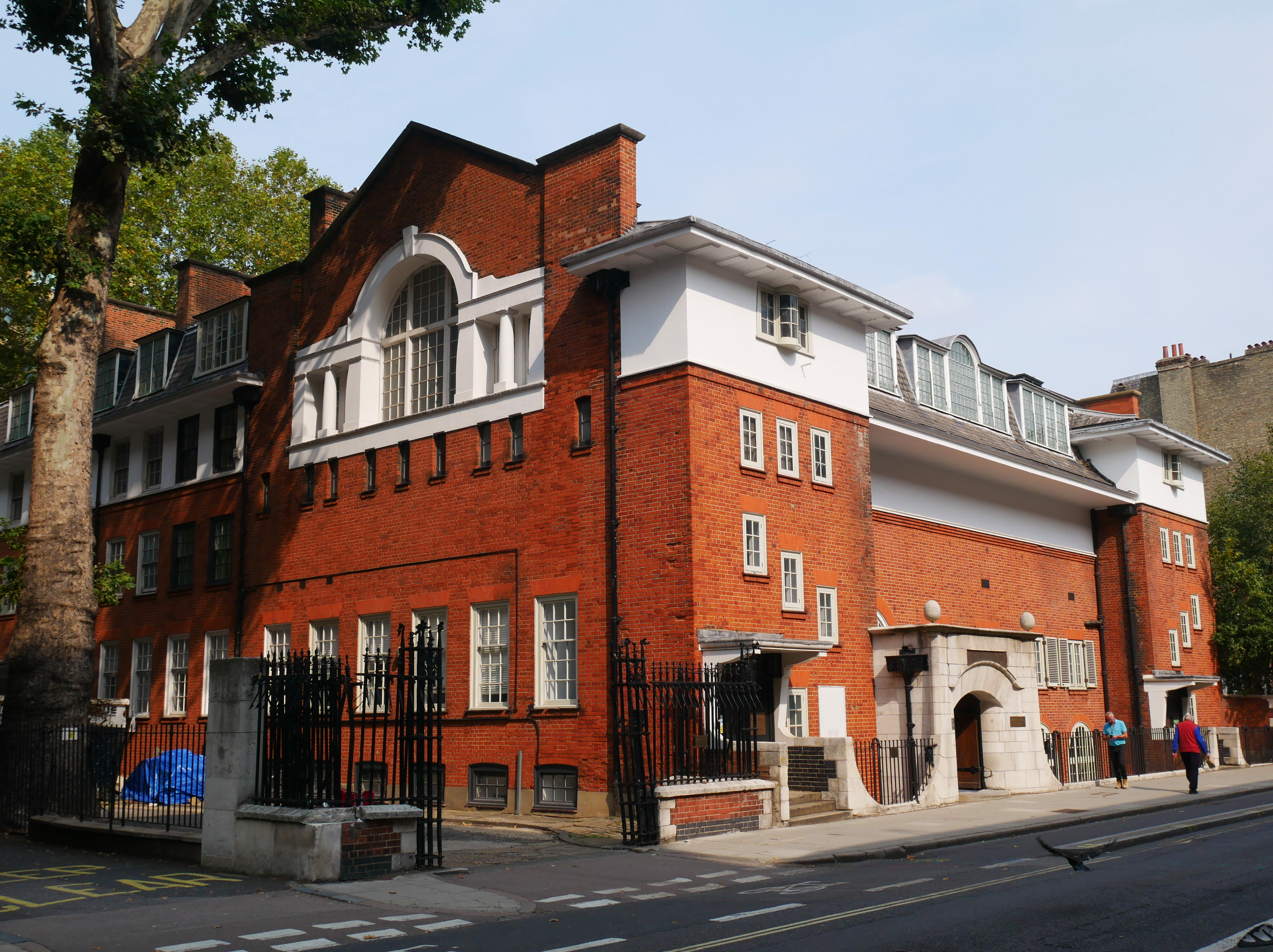
Mary Ward House, Tavistock Place, London (1899).

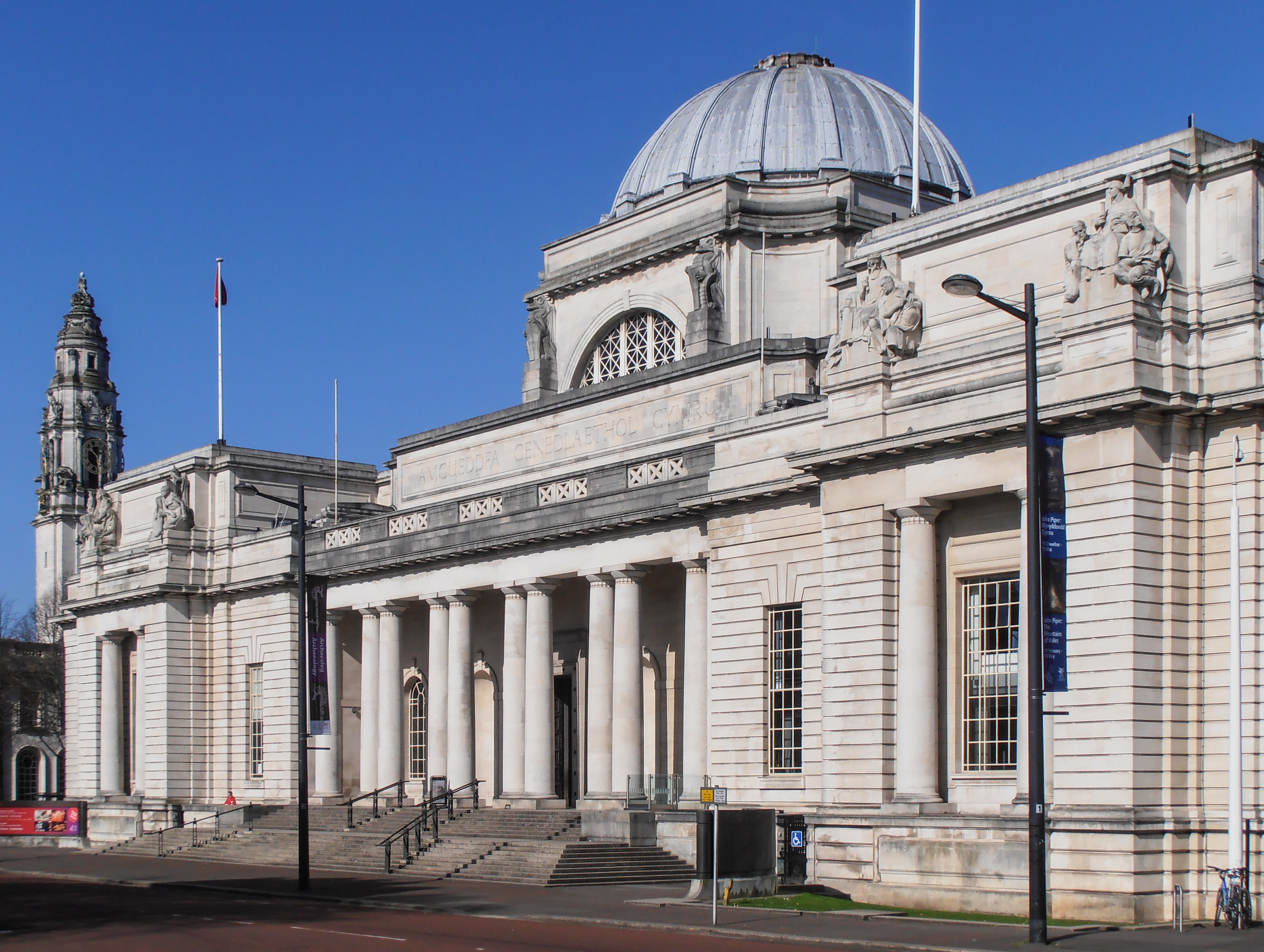
National Museum Cardiff, Cardiff (1912).

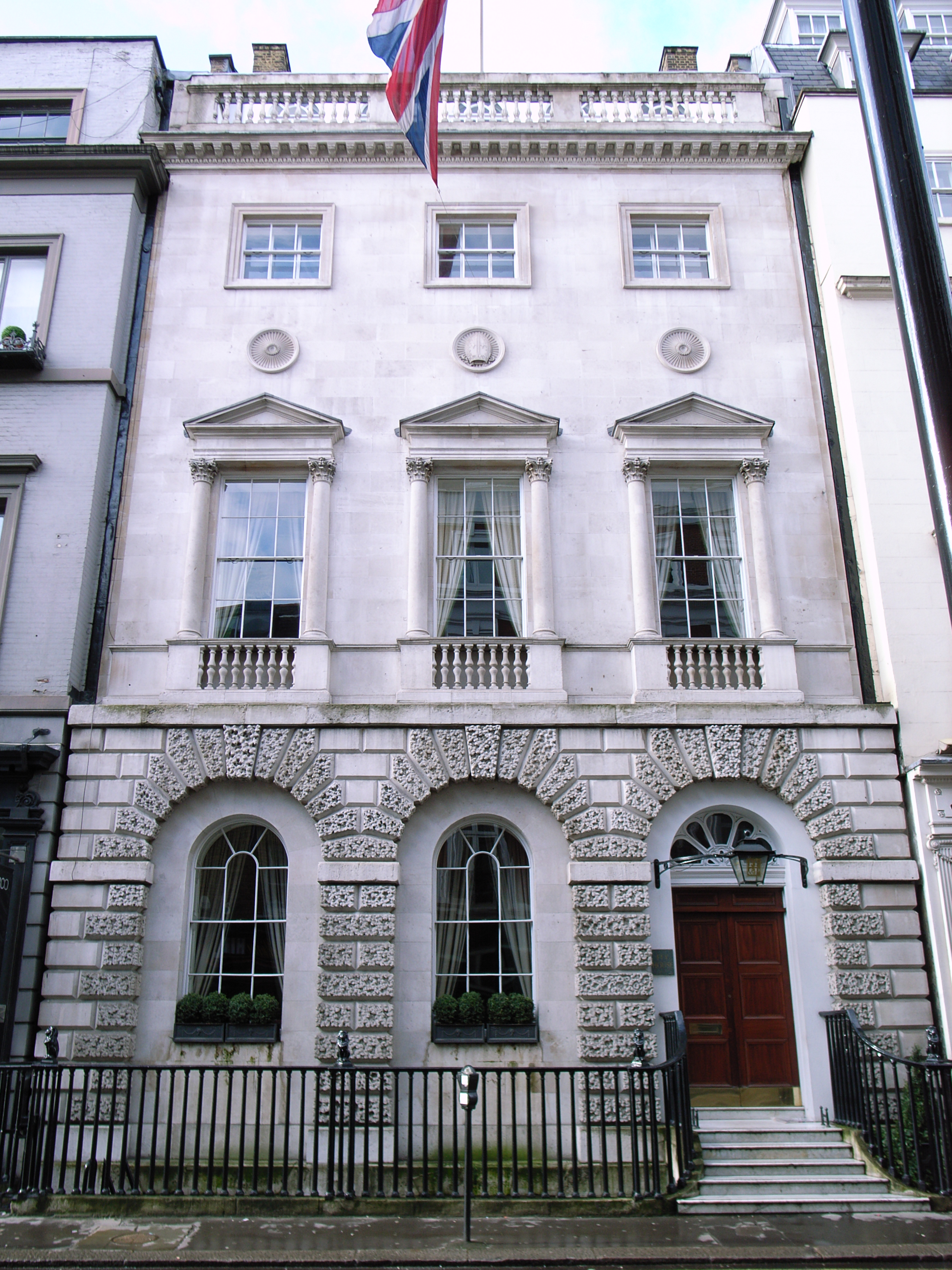
Ely House, 37 Dover Street, London. Altered by Smith and Brewer. They heightened the building and altered the interiors in 1907–09 and again in 1926–27.
Grade II* and Grade II listed buildings
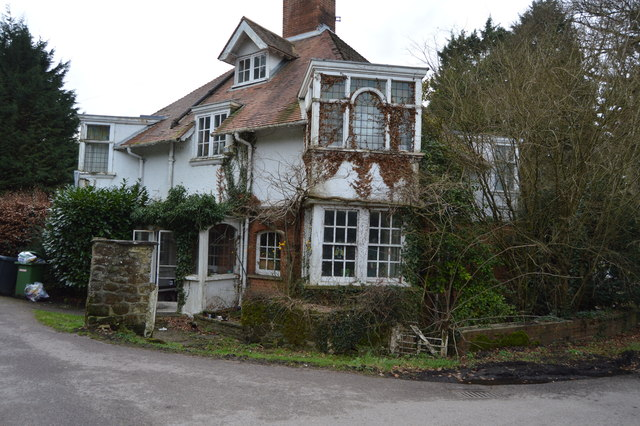
Rookery Lodge, Westcott (1896) [II]

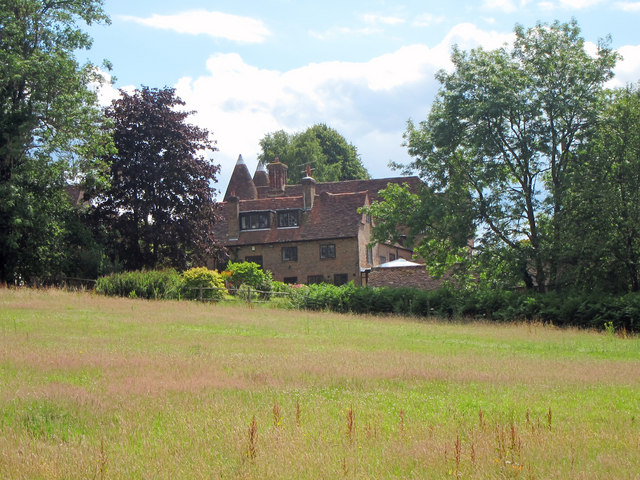
Old Buckhurst, Withyham (early 20th century) [II]

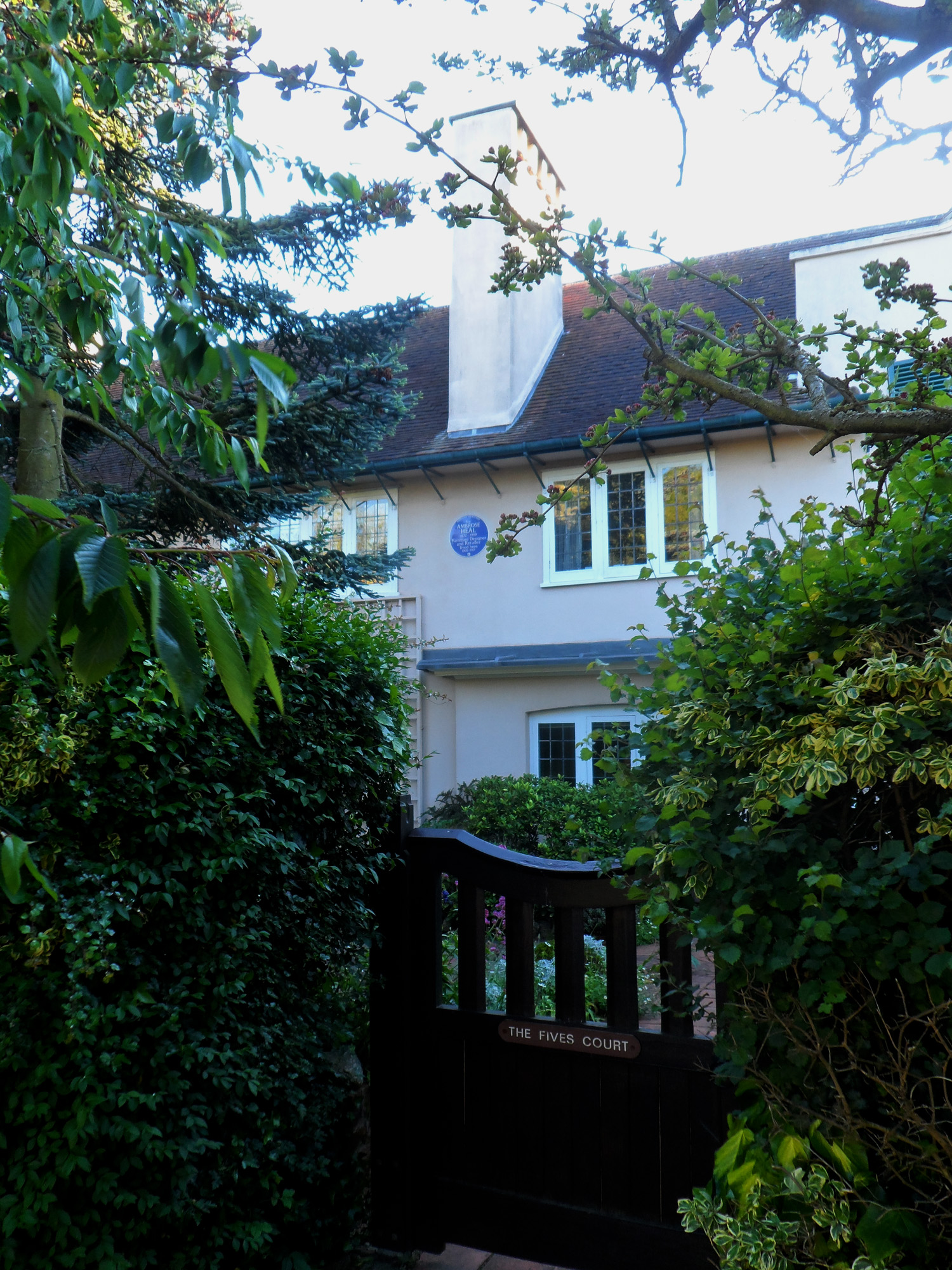
The Fives Court, Pinner (1900) [II]

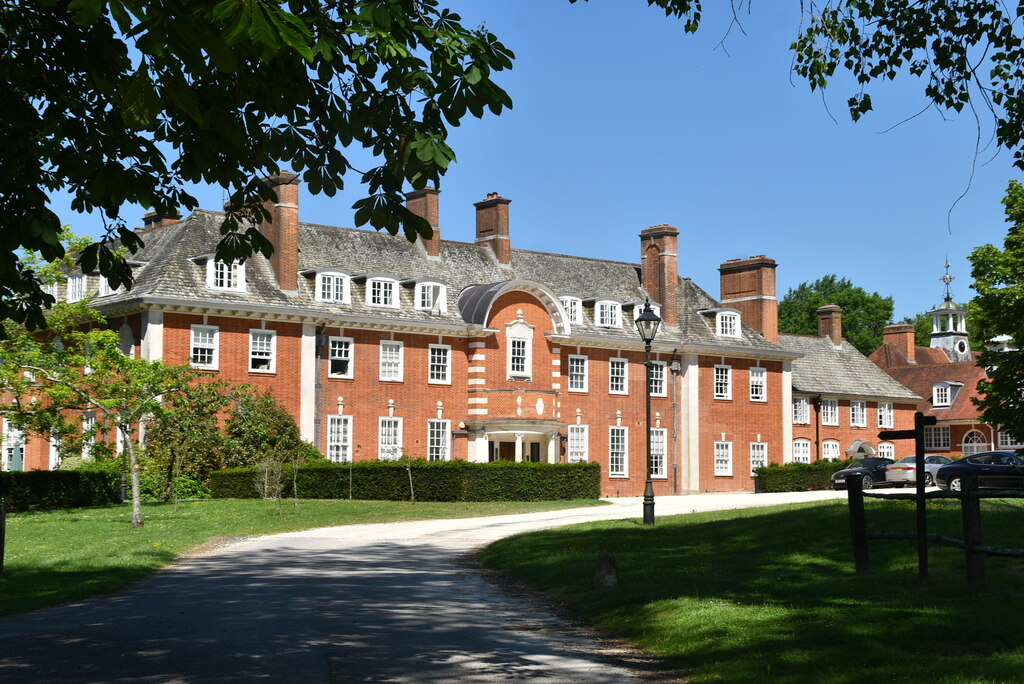
Ditton Place, Balcombe. (1904) [II*]

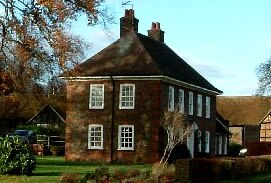
Farmhouse at Stocks Farm (1908) [II]

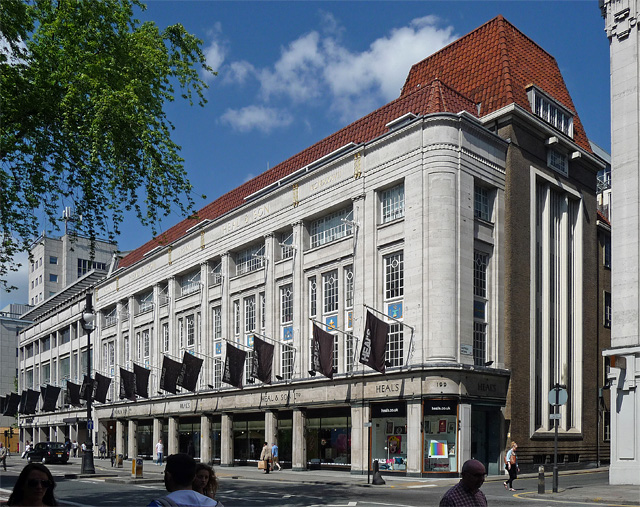
Heal's, Tottenham Court Road, London (1916) [II*]

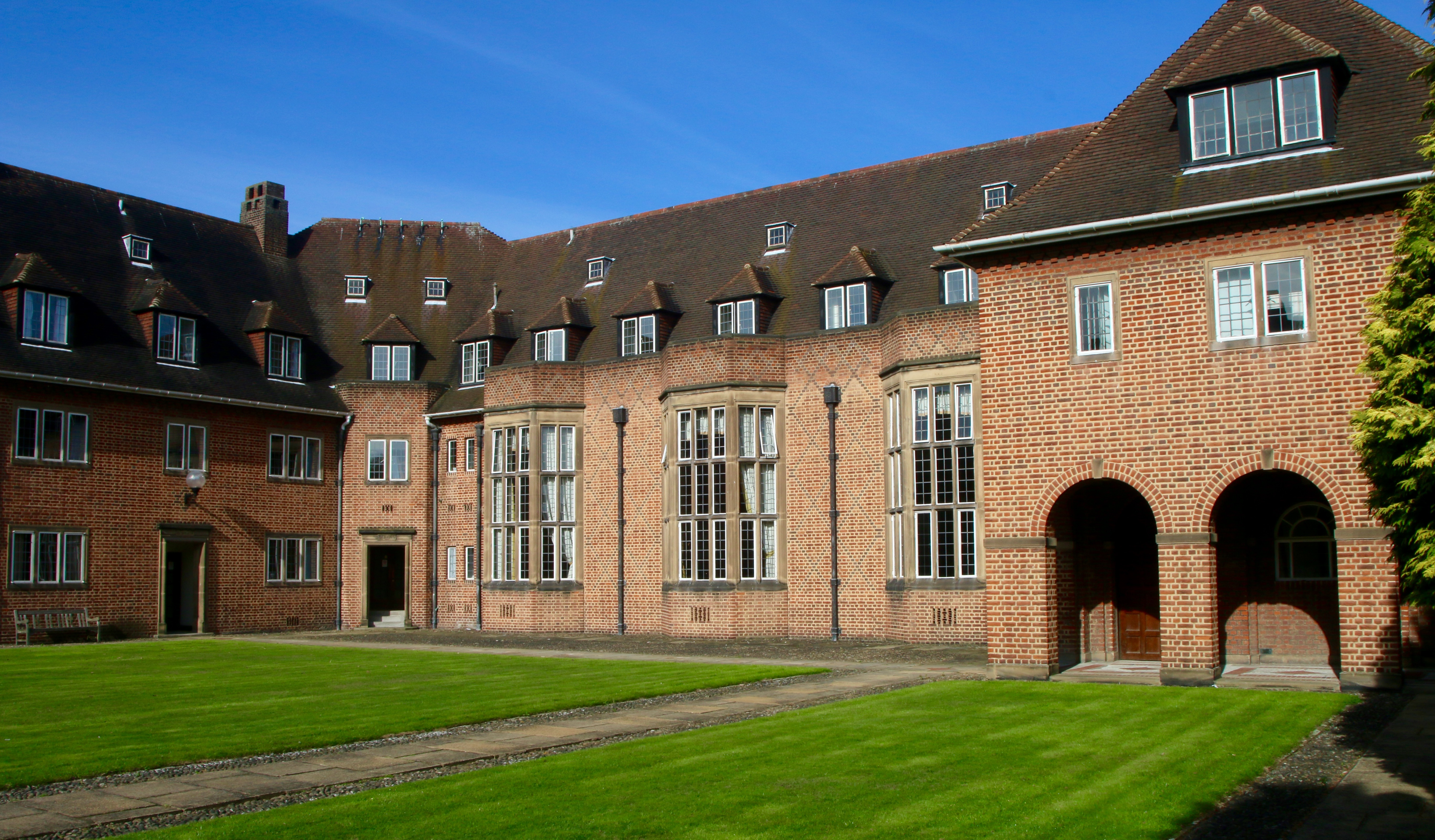
Old Hall, Henderson Halls of Residence (1932) [II]
