= Roy Orbison/The Beatles Tour =

1963 concert tour by Roy Orbison and the Beatles

Roy Orbison/The Beatles Tour 1963
- Tour by Roy Orbison and The Beatles
- Poster to the concerts in Woolwich
- Start date: 18 May 1963
- End date: 9 June 1963
- Legs: 1
- No. of shows: 21
the Beatles tour chronology
Spring 1963 Tour	Roy Orbison/The Beatles Tour (1963)	Summer 1963 UK Tour

The Roy Orbison/The Beatles Tour was a 1963 concert tour of the United Kingdom by Roy Orbison and the Beatles. Other acts on the tour included Gerry and the Pacemakers, David MacBeth, Louise Cordet, Tony Marsh, Terry Young Six, Erkey Grant and Ian Crawford. It was Orbison's first, and the Beatles' third nationwide tour of the UK. Although Orbison was originally intended to be the headlining act, the reaction to the Beatles on the tour caused them to be promoted to co-headliners, with the Beatles closing the set in the traditional headlining spot.

== Setlists ==
=== The Beatles ===
The Beatles' typical setlist (showing lead vocalist) was:

1. "Some Other Guy" (John Lennon)
2. "Do You Want to Know a Secret?" (George Harrison)
3. "Love Me Do" or "A Taste Of Honey" (Paul McCartney)
4. "From Me to You" (John Lennon and Paul McCartney)
5. "Please Please Me" (John Lennon)
6. "I Saw Her Standing There" (Paul McCartney)
7. "Twist and Shout" (John Lennon) or "Long Tall Sally" (Paul McCartney)

=== Roy Orbison ===
Roy Orbison's typical setlist was:

1. "Only the Lonely"
2. "Candy Man"
3. "Running Scared"
4. "What'd I Say" (Ray Charles)
5. "Dream Baby (How Long Must I Dream)"
6. "In Dreams"

== Tour dates ==
Date	Town or city	Country	Venue
18 May 1963	Slough	England	Adelphi
19 May 1963	Hanley	England	Gaumont
20 May 1963	Southampton	England	Gaumont
22 May 1963	Ipswich	England	Gaumont
23 May 1963	Nottingham	England	Odeon
24 May 1963	Walthamstow	England	Granada
25 May 1963	Sheffield	England	Sheffield City Hall
26 May 1963	Liverpool	England	Empire
27 May 1963	Cardiff	Wales	Capitol Theatre
28 May 1963	Worcester	England	Gaumont
29 May 1963	York	England	Rialto
30 May 1963	Manchester	England	Odeon
31 May 1963	Southend-on-Sea	England	Odeon
1 June 1963	Tooting	England	Granada
2 June 1963	Brighton	England	Brighton Hippodrome
3 June 1963	Woolwich	England	Granada
4 June 1963	Birmingham	England	Birmingham Town Hall
5 June 1963	Leeds	England	Odeon
7 June 1963	Glasgow	Scotland	Odeon
8 June 1963	Newcastle upon Tyne	England	Newcastle City Hall
9 June 1963	Blackburn	England	King George's Hall

== Personnel ==
- Roy Orbison – vocals, guitar
- Rodney Justo – background vocals
- Dean "Ox" Daughtry – keyboards
- John Rainey Adkins – guitar
- Paul Garrison – drums
- Billy Gilmore - bass

Orbison was given two amplifiers by Jim Marshall – the first two Marshalls to come into America.

=== The Beatles ===
- John Lennon – vocals, rhythm guitar, acoustic guitar, harmonica
- Paul McCartney – vocals, bass guitar
- George Harrison – vocals, lead guitar, acoustic guitar
- Ringo Starr – drums

== See also ==
- List of the Beatles' live performances
