= Walker Riverside Academy =

Location
- Waverdale Avenue; Walker; Newcastle upon Tyne, Tyne and Wear, NE6 4LA; England; 54.98074°N 1.54431°W

Information
- Type: Academy
- Local authority: Newcastle City Council
- Trust: Tyne Coast Academy Trust
- Department for Education URN: 145528 Tables
- Ofsted: Reports
- Headteacher: Mike Collier
- Gender: Co-educational
- Age: 11 to 16
- Enrolment: 1,098
- Website: https://www.walker.academy/

Walker Riverside Academy is a co-educational secondary school located in the Walker area of Newcastle upon Tyne, Tyne and Wear, England.

The school was previously granted specialist status as a Technology College, later also as an Arts College. In March 2018, Walker Technology College converted to academy status and was renamed Walker Riverside Academy, sponsored by the Tyne Coast Academies Trust.

Walker Riverside Academy offers GCSEs and BTECs as programmes of study for pupils.

Walker is one of eleven schools to be rebuilt in the government's phase 2 PFI scheme of Newcastle Building Schools for the Future programme.
