= Jarrow School =

Location
- Field Terrace; Jarrow, South Tyneside, NE32 5PR; England

Information
- Type: Foundation school
- Local authority: South Tyneside
- Department for Education URN: 133725 Tables
- Ofsted: Reports
- Head teacher: Paul Atkinson
- Gender: Coeducational
- Age: 11 to 16
- Enrolment: 820
- Website: www.jarrowschool.com

Jarrow School is a coeducational secondary school in Jarrow, South Tyneside, England admitting pupils aged 11 to 16.

== History ==
It was opened on 6 January 2003 following the merger of Springfield Comprehensive and Hedworthfield Comprehensive, and is based at the old Springfield site. Its full title is Jarrow School, Engineering Excellence In Education, the result of a competition to choose an inspirational name for the new school. In 2007 the school became a specialist Engineering College.

The former Jarrow Grammar School opened in 1911. In June 2010, this building was demolished.

In October 2013 the school's headteacher Sir Kenneth Gibson became the first person to be knighted by Prince William, Duke of Cambridge.

=== Springfield ===
Springfield was Jarrow's grammar school and was formerly known as Jarrow Grammar School. It became a comprehensive school in 1975 to cater for all prospective pupils' academic abilities, in common with the other schools in the area including Hedworthfield.

=== Hedworthfield ===
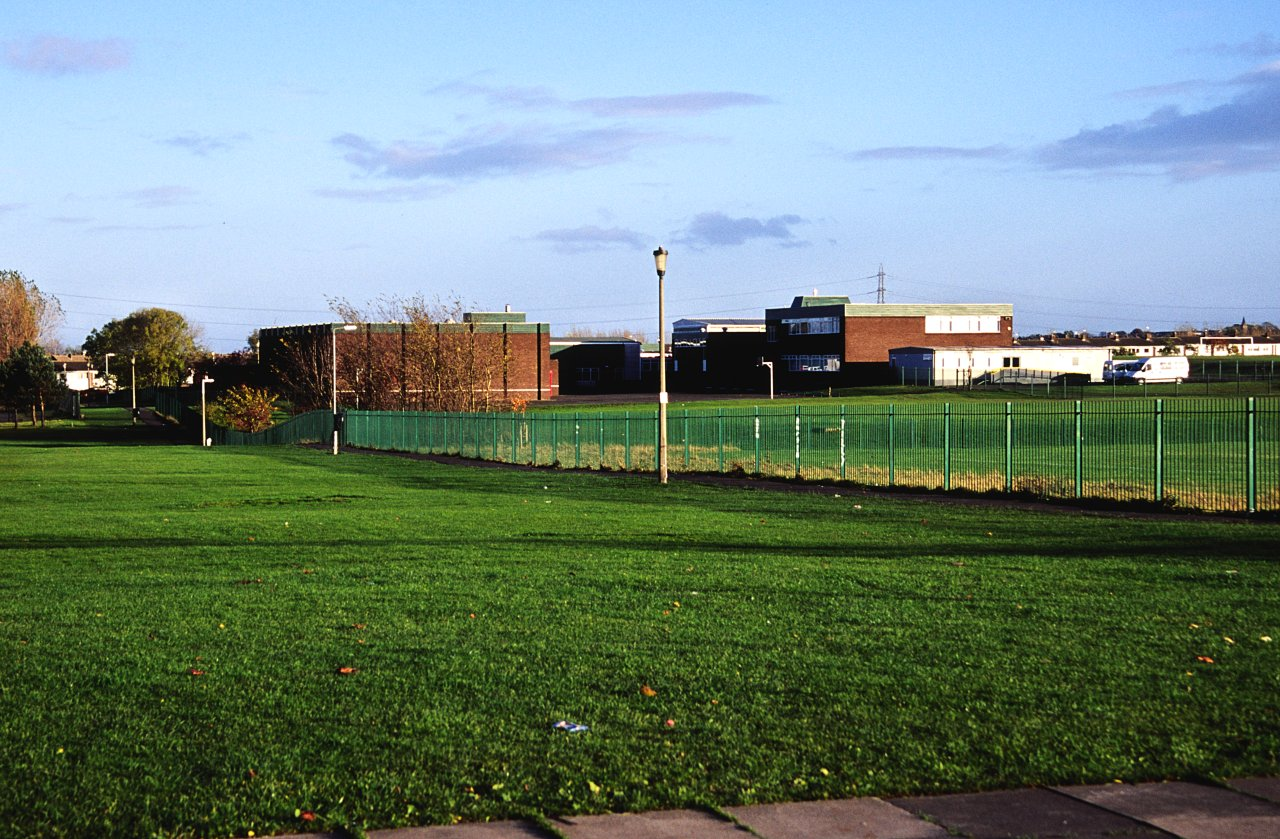
Hedworthfield Comprehensive School circa 2002.

Hedworthfield was designated as a complementary secondary modern school to Jarrow Grammar School's provision as the local grammar school. It was a newer development built in the 1960s at Fellgate on the outskirts of Jarrow. Extensive building work was completed in the late 1970s providing the school with better facilities for arts and crafts, a music and drama studio, a community centre and a sports complex containing badminton and squash courts, a gym and other facilities.

Alongside Springfield, it was converted to a comprehensive school in 1978. However, following its redesignation, some parents still insisted on sending their children to Springfield, even though they were no longer in its catchment area; they cited concerns that an ex-secondary modern school might not measure up to the same academic standards as the former grammar school. Additionally, Hedworthfield had no provision for teaching 6th form pupils, meaning that those choosing to study subjects at A-level had to relocate once they had completed their O-levels or GCSEs. Generally, 6th form students opted to transfer to Springfield to continue their education.

=== Merger ===
Following the dwindling number of pupils for the new intake year-on-year, it became apparent that continuing to fund the running of both schools in parallel was no longer viable, so a merger into a single school was proposed. After some debate as to whether it should be on one of the existing sites, or an entirely new site funded by a Private Finance Initiative, the decision was taken to locate the merged school at the Springfield campus.

Students at both schools protested, and more than 100 pupils at Jarrow School were involved in a "near riot" during the summer of 2003, during which police made three arrests.

=== New building ===
The old Jarrow School building has been replaced by a new school on the same site, funded by Building Schools for the Future. The building was constructed under contract by Sir Robert Mcalpine.

== Notable former pupils ==
=== Jarrow Grammar School ===
- Steve Cram MBE, athlete
- Jack Cunningham, Baron Cunningham of Felling, politician
- Robin Donkin, historian
- Doug McAvoy, General Secretary from 1989 to 2004 of the National Union of Teachers (NUT)
- John Miles (John Errington), musician
- Fergus Montgomery, Conservative MP from 1959 to 1964 for Newcastle upon Tyne East, from 1967 to 1974 for Brierley Hill, and from 1974 to 1997 for Altrincham and Sale West
- Alan Price, musician

=== Springfield Comprehensive School ===
- Alan Donnelly, Labour MEP from 1989 to 1999 for Tyne and Wear
- Stephen Hepburn, Labour MP from 1997 to 2019 for Jarrow
- Seymour Mace, comedian
