= Nick Brown =

British former politician (born 1950)

The Right Honourable Nick Brown
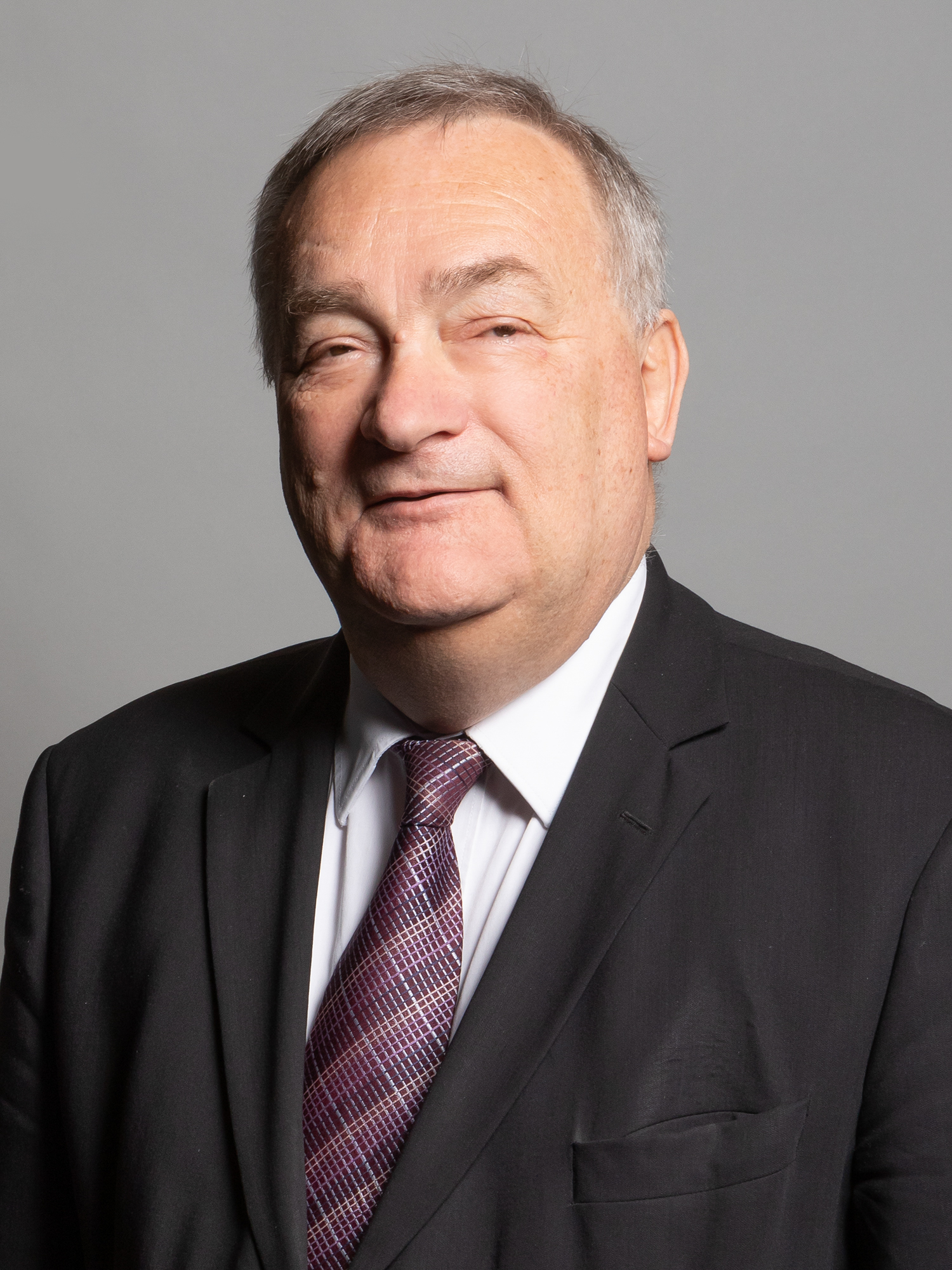
- Official portrait, 2020

Government Chief Whip in the House of Commons Parliamentary Secretary to the Treasury
- In office 3 October 2008 – 11 May 2010
- Prime Minister: Gordon Brown
- Preceded by: Geoff Hoon
- Succeeded by: Patrick McLoughlin
- In office 2 May 1997 – 27 July 1998
- Prime Minister: Tony Blair
- Preceded by: Alastair Goodlad
- Succeeded by: Ann Taylor

Minister of Agriculture, Fisheries and Food
- In office 27 July 1998 – 11 June 2001
- Prime Minister: Tony Blair
- Preceded by: Jack Cunningham
- Succeeded by: Margaret Beckett

Member of Parliament for Newcastle upon Tyne East Newcastle upon Tyne East and Wallsend (1997–2010)
- In office 9 June 1983 – 30 May 2024
- Preceded by: Mike Thomas
- Succeeded by: Mary Glindon

Chair of the Finance Committee
- In office 26 May 2021 – 7 March 2023
- Preceded by: Lilian Greenwood
- Succeeded by: Sharon Hodgson
- In office 21 July 2015 – 17 October 2016
- Preceded by: John Thurso
- Succeeded by: Rosie Winterton
Junior ministerial offices
Minister for the North East
In office 28 June 2007 – 11 May 2010
Prime Minister	Gordon Brown
Preceded by	Office established
Succeeded by	Office abolished
Deputy Chief Whip of the House of Commons Treasurer of the Household
In office 28 June 2007 – 3 October 2008
Prime Minister	Gordon Brown
Preceded by	Bob Ainsworth
Succeeded by	Tommy McAvoy
Minister of State for Work
In office 11 June 2001 – 13 June 2003
Prime Minister	Tony Blair
Preceded by	Office established
Succeeded by	Des Browne
Shadow portfolios
Shadow Cabinet
2016–2021	Chief Whip
2010–2010	Chief Whip
1994–1994	Commons Leader (Acting)
Shadow Frontbench
1995–1997	Deputy Chief Whip
1994–1995	Health
1992–1994	Deputy Commons Leader
1988–1992	Treasury
1985–1988	Solicitor General

Personal details
- Born: Nicholas Hugh Brown; 13 June 1950 (age 76) Hawkhurst, Kent, England
- Party: Labour (until 2023)
- Education: University of Manchester (BA)

Nicholas Hugh Brown (born 13 June 1950) is a British former politician and trade unionist who served as Member of Parliament (MP) for Newcastle upon Tyne East between 1983 and 2024. He represented the Labour Party until his resignation in 2023. Brown is the longest-serving Chief Whip of the Labour Party, discontinuously holding the position several times between 1997 and 2021 under Blair, Brown, Miliband, Corbyn and Starmer.

Brown attended Cabinet as Government Chief Whip from 1997 until 1998 and again from 2008 until 2010, and as Agriculture Minister from 1998 to 2001. Brown also held the position of Regional Minister for the North East between 2007 and 2010.

== Early life ==
Nicholas Hugh Brown was born in Hawkhurst, Kent, and brought up in Tunbridge Wells. He was educated at Tunbridge Wells Grammar School for Boys and the University of Manchester. After graduating from university, Brown worked in the advertising department of Procter & Gamble. He then in 1978 became a legal adviser to the northern region of the GMBATU, later GMB, based in Newcastle upon Tyne.

== Political career ==
=== Early political career: 1980–1997 ===
In 1980, Brown was elected to Newcastle City Council as a Labour councillor, representing the Walker ward.

Brown was chosen as the new Labour Party candidate for the parliamentary seat after Mike Thomas, the Labour Member of Parliament (MP) for Newcastle upon Tyne East, defected to the SDP. Brown easily retained the seat for Labour at the 1983 general election. Originally elected to the Commons in the same year as Gordon Brown and Tony Blair, Brown was initially close to both men, but over time became his namesake Brown's staunchest ally, though the two are unrelated.

Brown was first appointed to Labour's frontbench team in 1985 as a shadow solicitor general. In 1988, he was moved to the position of Treasury spokesperson before briefly becoming shadow spokesperson for health between 1994 and 1995.

In the 1994 Labour leadership election, he supported Gordon Brown and acted as his unofficial campaign manager and, according to biographer Paul Routledge, advised against his withdrawing from the contest in Blair's favour. He backed Margaret Beckett for leadership.

In 1995, Brown was appointed as opposition Deputy Chief Whip in the House of Commons and played a central role in Parliament in trying to defeat the Conservative government's parliamentary agenda.

=== Government: 1997–2010 ===
Following Labour's election victory in 1997, he was appointed as government Chief Whip in the House of Commons, but stayed there only for just over a year, to then be moved to the Ministry of Agriculture, Fisheries and Food in Tony Blair's first ministerial shuffle in July 1998. This change, which followed the publication of the Routledge biography earlier that year, was widely seen as a demotion, and ascribed to his close connection with Gordon Brown.

His tenure as the Minister of Agriculture, Fisheries and Food saw several animal health crises, ending with the 2001 foot-and-mouth outbreak. Brown's handling of the outbreak was criticised by some and used to attack the government, though he maintained the support of the farming and food industries and the veterinary profession throughout the crisis. Suggestions that a vaccination strategy should have been practised in preference to the culling of hundreds of thousands of animals, made with the benefit of hindsight, did not help his cause, and he was demoted to Minister of State for Work, with non-voting Cabinet rank, after the general election of 2001. In June 2003, he was dropped from the government altogether.

In 2004, he was one of the organisers of a backbench rebellion against the government's proposals for the introduction of tuition fees, but hours before the vote announced that he had received significant concessions from the Government and would now support it. Some suspected that the Chancellor had placed considerable pressure on him to back down and the affair cost Brown some credibility.

On 29 June 2007, Gordon Brown became Prime Minister and immediately appointed Nick Brown as the Regional Minister for the North East and simultaneously as the new Deputy Chief Whip.

Following a government reshuffle in 2008, Gordon Brown returned Nick Brown to his original government position of Government Chief Whip, whilst retaining his position as Minister for the North East.

In 2009, Brown was appointed to investigate the legitimacy of expense claims by Labour MPs between 2004 and 2008. According to The Daily Telegraph in this period Brown himself claimed a total of £87,708 for his constituency home.

Brown's mortgage interest repayments for 2007–8 totalled £6,600, but he also claimed a total of £23,068, just £15 below the maximum allowable amount for the year. The claim included £4,800 for food – the maximum allowable amount – £2,880 for repairs and insurance, £2,880 for services, £897.65 for cleaning, £1,640 for phones and £1,810 for utilities. Brown, however, has said that he saved the taxpayer a considerable amount of money by turning down a government car and driver upon being made Chief Whip, the annual cost of which would have been around £100,000.

=== Opposition: 2010–2024 ===
On 29 September 2010, newly elected Labour Party leader Ed Miliband asked Brown to stand down as Chief Whip due to the need for a "break from the past".

On 29 January 2011, during the News of the World phone hacking affair, Brown said that his landline may have been bugged in 1998, around the time of his being outed. He was also contacted by an undisclosed police force in the West of England in 2003, who told him that they were pursuing a phone-tapping prosecution and he was one of those who may have been targeted. The case collapsed when it reached court and full details of the allegations were never disclosed. Brown said that: "Given that it was near [Prince Charles' home] Highgrove, my assumption was that this might involve the Royal Family. But I was never explicitly told that."

In 2014, Brown publicly opposed his party's proposal to scrap the position of Police and Crime Commissioner (PCC), citing the effectiveness of the three PCCs in north east England at the time.

Ahead of the 2016 EU membership referendum, Brown stated he supported remaining in the European Union.

On 6 October 2016, Brown was reappointed as Labour Chief Whip by Jeremy Corbyn, and thus became Opposition Chief Whip in the House of Commons.

Brown was again reappointed as Labour Chief Whip by Sir Keir Starmer after the latter's victory in the 2020 Labour Party leadership election. This reappointment meant that Brown was the only person to have held the role for three non-consecutive terms, as well as under six different leaders (Blair, Brown, Harman, briefly Miliband, Corbyn and Starmer) across four decades. Brown left the role of Chief Whip for the third time as a result of Starmer's Shadow Cabinet reshuffle in May 2021. On 26 May 2021, Brown returned as chair of the Finance Committee.

In September 2022, Brown was suspended from the Labour Party following allegations concerning an event 25 years previously, details of which were not made public. On 12 December 2023, he resigned from the Labour Party in protest at the unresolved disciplinary process. He also announced that he would not be contesting the next election.

== Personal life ==
Brown is a holder of the freedom of the City of Newcastle upon Tyne award, a supporter of Humanists UK, a member of GMB, and an honorary associate of the National Secular Society. He is known to have a love for classical music, which developed during his time at Manchester University. Brown was a member of the Labour Friends of Israel group.

In 1998, Brown came out as gay after a former lover contacted the News of the World offering to sell his story. In a speech, he announced: "The Sun is out – and so am I."

From 2012 until 2022, he was a non-executive director of the Mariinsky Theatre Trust (the Anglo-Russian friendship organisation that supports the work of the Mariinsky Theatre in the UK). He is a governor of Walker Riverside Academy, a patron of Leeds Youth Opera and a trustee of the Biscuit Factory art exhibition in Shieldfield, Newcastle. He formerly chaired the all-party parliamentary group for motorcycle speedway racing.

Parliament of the United Kingdom
Preceded by Mike Thomas	Member of Parliament for Newcastle upon Tyne East; Newcastle upon Tyne East and Wallsend (1997–2010); 1983–2024	Constituency abolished
Political offices
Preceded by Margaret Beckett	Shadow Leader of the House of Commons; Acting; 1994	Succeeded by Margaret Beckett
Preceded by Alastair Goodlad	Government Chief Whip in the House of Commons; 1997–1998	Succeeded by Ann Taylor
Preceded by Alastair Goodlad	Parliamentary Secretary to the Treasury; 1997–1998	Succeeded by Ann Taylor
Preceded by Jack Cunningham	Minister of Agriculture, Fisheries and Food; 1998–2001	Succeeded by Margaret Beckett as Secretary of State for Environment, Food and Rural Affairs
New office	Minister of State for Work; 2001–2003	Succeeded by Des Browne
Preceded by Bob Ainsworth	Government Deputy Chief Whip in the House of Commons; 2007–2008	Succeeded by Tommy McAvoy
Preceded by Bob Ainsworth	Treasurer of the Household; 2007–2008	Succeeded by Tommy McAvoy
New office	Minister for the North East; 2007–2010	Position abolished
Preceded by Geoff Hoon	Government Chief Whip in the House of Commons; 2008–2010	Succeeded by Patrick McLoughlin
Preceded by Geoff Hoon	Parliamentary Secretary to the Treasury; 2008–2010	Succeeded by Patrick McLoughlin
Preceded by Patrick McLoughlin	Opposition Chief Whip in the House of Commons; 2010	Succeeded by Rosie Winterton
Preceded by Rosie Winterton	Opposition Chief Whip in the House of Commons; 2016–2021	Succeeded by Sir Alan Campbell
Party political offices
Preceded by Don Dixon	Labour Deputy Chief Whip in the House of Commons; 1995–1997	Succeeded by George Mudie
Preceded by Donald Dewar	Chief Whip of the Labour Party in the House of Commons; 1997–1998	Succeeded by Ann Taylor
Preceded by Bob Ainsworth	Deputy Chief Whip of the Labour Party in the House of Commons; 2007–2008	Succeeded by Tommy McAvoy
Preceded by Geoff Hoon	Chief Whip of the Labour Party in the House of Commons; 2008–2010	Succeeded by Rosie Winterton
Preceded by Rosie Winterton	Chief Whip of the Labour Party in the House of Commons; 2016–2021	Succeeded by Sir Alan Campbell
