= 1967 Brierley Hill by-election =

UK Parliamentary by-election

The 1967 Brierley Hill by-election of 27 April 1967 was held after the death of Conservative Member of Parliament (MP) John Ellis Talbot.

The seat was marginal, having been won by Labour during 1950 United Kingdom general election by 4,637 votes, and the Conservatives in the preceding 1966 United Kingdom general election by only 1,567.

== Candidates ==
- Fergus Montgomery for the Conservatives, was a teacher and councillor in Hebburn prior to becoming Member of Parliament for Newcastle East
- Derek Forwood was the Labour candidate. He told the Guardian newspaper in 2005 an anecdote from the Brierley Hill by-election at which then foreign secretary George Brown was subject to heckling at a hustings event. When he addressed the crowd and spoke of morality, a woman shouted out, "Hey, George, what do know about morality?" to which he shot back: "Come outside, love, and I'll show you!"
- Liberal candidate Michael Steed was lecturer in Government at Manchester University at the time of the election. His election addresses included calls to join the EEC and end the Vietnam war
- Writer John Creasey nominated himself as candidate for the All Party Alliance he had created.

== Result of the previous general election ==
General election 1966: Brierley Hill
Party	Candidate	Votes	%	±%
Conservative	J. E. Talbot	34,026	51.18	
Labour	K C Rogers	32,459	48.82	
Majority		1,567	2.36	
Turnout		66,485	78.95	
Conservative hold		Swing		

== Result of the by-election ==
Brierley Hill by-election, 27 April 1967
Party	Candidate	Votes	%	±%
Conservative	Fergus Montgomery	31,371	53.75	+2.57
Labour	Derek Forwood	21,151	36.24	−12.58
Liberal	Michael Steed	4,536	7.77	New
All Party Alliance	John Creasey	1,305	2.24	New
Majority		10,220	17.51	+15.15
Turnout		58,363		
Conservative hold		Swing		
