= Geoffrey Rhodes =

Geoffrey William Rhodes (7 November 1928 – 22 June 1974) was a British Labour Co-operative politician and lecturer. He was the MP for Newcastle-upon-Tyne East from 1964 until his death.

== Early life and career ==
Born in Leeds, Rhodes was educated at the University of Leeds. He then worked at Leigh Technical College, where he became head of the department of business studies. From 1953, he was active in the National Union of Teachers.

== Political career ==
From 1953 to 1958 he represented Bramley ward on Leeds City Council.

Having unsuccessfully fought Barkston Ash in 1955 and Battersea South at the 1959 United Kingdom general election, Rhodes was elected Member of Parliament for Newcastle-upon-Tyne East in 1964. He was Parliamentary Private Secretary to Richard Crossman from 1956 to 1967, and then served on the Council of Europe until 1970. From 1968 to 1972, he chaired the Labour Party National Working Group on Higher Education.

== Personal life and death ==
In 1954, Rhodes married Marise Wiseman, and they had two children. He died on 22 June 1974, aged 45, between the two general elections of that year. He had been ill for some weeks prior with pulmonary oedema.

Parliament of the United Kingdom
Preceded by Fergus Montgomery	Member of Parliament for Newcastle-upon-Tyne East; 1964–1974	Succeeded by Mike Thomas
