= Arthur Blenkinsop =

British politician (1911–79)

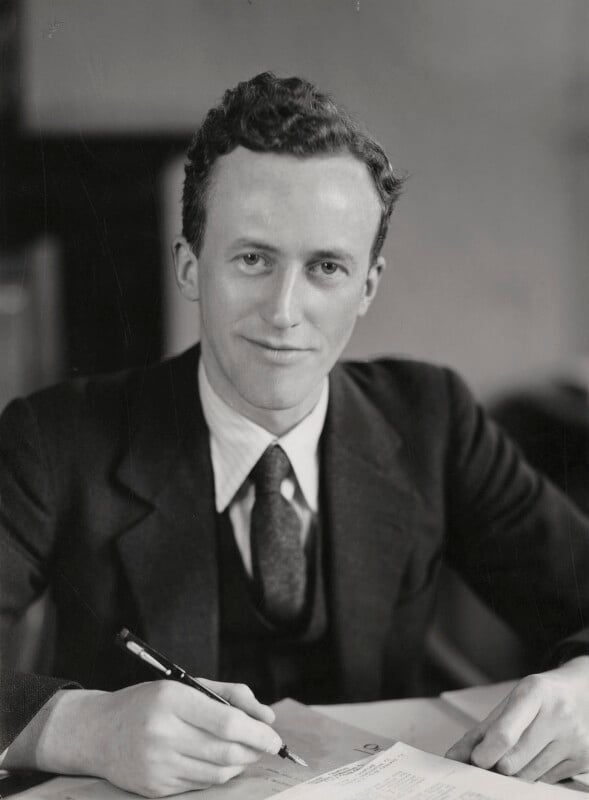
Blenkinsop in 1946

Arthur Blenkinsop MP (30 June 1911 – 23 September 1979) was a British Labour Party politician.

Blenkinsop was educated at the Royal Grammar School, Newcastle, and the College of Commerce, Newcastle-upon-Tyne, and became a chartered secretary.

At the 1945 general election, Blenkinsop was elected as Member of Parliament for Newcastle upon Tyne East. He was Parliamentary Secretary to the Ministry of Pensions (1946–1949) and to the Ministry of Health (1949–1951).

After losing his seat at the 1959 general election, he became a Newcastle City Councillor in 1961. At the 1964 general election, Blenkinsop returned to Parliament as the MP for South Shields, and held the seat until he stood down in at the 1979 general election.

He was President of the Public Health Inspectors Association, a governor of the British Film Institute and vice-president of the Ramblers Association. He became a member of the Medical Research Council in 1965.

He died four months after his retirement, aged 68. Arthur Blenkinsop is the great-uncle of Christopher Blenkinsop, founder and head of Berlin-based music group 17 Hippies.

Parliament of the United Kingdom
Preceded by Sir Robert Aske	Member of Parliament for Newcastle-upon-Tyne East; 1945–1959	Succeeded by Fergus Montgomery
Preceded by Chuter Ede	Member of Parliament for South Shields; 1964–1979	Succeeded by David Clark
Party political offices
Preceded by William Rodgers	Chairman of the Fabian Society; 1967 – 1968	Succeeded by Peter Shore
