= Mike Thomas (politician) =

British politician

Member of Parliament for Newcastle upon Tyne East
- In office 10 October 1974 – 13 May 1983
- Preceded by: Geoffrey Rhodes
- Succeeded by: Nick Brown

Personal details
- Born: Michael Stuart Thomas; 24 May 1944 (age 81)
- Party: Labour (1965–81); SDP (1981–88) 'Continuing' SDP (1988–90)
- Spouse: Maureen Kelly (m. 1976)

Michael Stuart Thomas (born 24 May 1944) is a former British politician, identified with the Labour Party until 1981 and thereafter with the Social Democratic Party (SDP). He became well known for his role in both the establishment of the SDP and then in the SDP's subsequent demise. The SDP's leader, Roy Jenkins, referred to Thomas as the "pint-sized Pavarotti", on the basis of his stocky build and beard together with his ebullient manner.

== Early life ==
Thomas was educated at the Latymer Upper School and King's School, Macclesfield. In the 1950s both were direct grant grammar schools to which many pupils, including Thomas, were admitted on the basis of local authority scholarships. He studied at Liverpool University from 1962 to 1966, graduating with a BA degree in Economics and Politics. From 1965 to 1966 he served as President of the Liverpool University Guild of Undergraduates and from 1966 to 1968 he was a member of the National Executive of the National Union of Students.

== Early political career ==
He initially made a career in political and social research, acting as head of the Co-operative Party's research department from 1966 to 1968 and as a research associate with the predecessor body of the Policy Studies Institute from 1968 to 1973. He stood as the Labour and Cooperative Party candidate for the constituency of East Hertfordshire in the 1970 general election. On that occasion, Thomas lost to the Conservative Party candidate by a 14,000 vote margin.

Thomas continued in his quest to find a seat in Parliament and eventually succeeded at Newcastle-upon-Tyne East in October 1974, after the death at age 45 of the sitting Labour member Geoff Rhodes. Thomas's rivals for the Labour candidature included a number of local Party activists, notably the prominent local councillor Jeremy Beecham. As an outsider to Newcastle Labour politics, Thomas won the selection vote with the support of left-wing and anti-establishment elements in the local Party. One of the party members who voted for Thomas at the selection meeting later characterised him as "... the classic 'man who got off the train from Kings Cross'. His key asset was that nobody knew anything about him."

He went on to be elected as the Labour and Co-operative Party MP for Newcastle East with a 6,000 vote majority over his Conservative opponent in the October 1974 general election.

== The Social Democratic Party ==
As a new Labour MP, Thomas served as parliamentary private secretary to minister Roy Hattersley from 1974 to 1976. He developed an interest in industrial and commercial matters, serving on the Parliamentary Select Committee on the Nationalised Industries from 1975 to 1979 and as Chairman of the Parliamentary Labour Party's Trade Group from 1979 to 1981. In 1976 he founded the parliamentary journal 'The House' Magazine.

Once established as an MP, Thomas soon became associated with the Campaign for Labour Victory group of right wingers in the Labour Party led by MP and Environment Minister Bill Rodgers. In February 1981 Thomas was among a number of Labour MPs who left the party to found the new Social Democratic Party. During a final meeting with his constituency Labour Party, Thomas claimed that a postal consultation with constituents showed that most of them supported his decision the leave the Labour Party. He declined to follow the advice of the constituency party that he should resign as an MP and contest a by-election. Thomas remained in Parliament as an SDP MP where he acted as his new party's spokesman on health and social services.

He played a prominent role in the new party's successful launch in March 1981. As a member of the SDP's national steering committee he advised on the selection of SDP candidates for the forthcoming general election and led negotiations with the Liberal Party concerning the sharing out of constituency candidacies between the two centrist parties. The terms of an SDP/Liberal alliance was critical to the electoral success of both. Thomas quickly became known for his obduracy in the seat negotiations with the Liberals. In July 1981 it was reported that :

"Senior Liberals were quietly seething... at the suggestion from Mike Thomas that half the prospective parliamentary candidates already adopted by local Liberal associations should stand down in favour of SDP members."

Many Liberals perceived Thomas's approach as being "... a cynical electoral deal imposed from above." Thomas sought re-election at Newcastle East in the 1983 general election as the SDP candidate, but could only come in third place. Labour's Nick Brown won with a majority of 7,000 votes over his Conservative opponent. Thomas stood for Parliament as an SDP/Alliance candidate in Exeter in 1987 but failed to be elected.

The SDP held its annual conference at Portsmouth in September 1987 and, by a 998–21 vote majority, delegates decided to open negotiations with the Liberal Party over a merger of the two parties. Thomas and some other high-profile SDP members were opposed to this merger. Thomas provided an iconic image for the demise of the SDP when he engaged in a heated face to face exchange with SDP President Shirley Williams over the use of a room at the conference centre for a meeting of those SDP members opposed to the merger. In full view of TV cameras, Williams refused Thomas access to the room on grounds that his group's meeting was not an official SDP function. Thomas initiated another heated disagreement at the Conference when he demanded access to the SDP's central membership list in order to facilitate his campaign to keep the SDP as an independent party. This provoked a further confrontation with Shirley Williams and Thomas moved a motion of no confidence in her chairmanship of the Conference. In March 1988 a ballot of SDP members approved a merger with the Liberals by an 18,872 - 9,929 vote majority.

Thomas became Vice-President of the SDP rump that continued as an independent party after the 1988 merger of the SDP's main body with the Liberal Party to form the Liberal Democrats. He continued trying to negotiate deals whereby SDP and Liberal Democrat candidates would stand down in each other's favour in particular constituencies. But by now his advances were being largely ignored.

== Later career ==
After losing his seat in Parliament in 1983, Thomas developed a portfolio of interests in journalism, corporate communications and management consulting. He worked on a number of the privatisation and demutualisation projects that were active in the late 1980s and early 90s. In 1988 he established his own consultancy named Corporate Communications Strategy. Thomas's entry in Who's Who states that since 1990 he has worked with the owners and managers of small and medium-sized enterprises to grow and develop their businesses.

He remained a prominent member of the SDP until that party's final demise in 1990. After 1990, unlike many former SDP leaders, Thomas did not immediately identify with any other political party. However, in 2009 he became site moderator of the Charter 2010 website which anticipated the result of the 2010 General Election and provided support for the political basis on which the Coalition Government of 2010-2015 was founded. In 2010 he joined the Liberal Democrats because he supported their decision to enter coalition government with the Conservatives.

== Personal life ==
Thomas married his current wife, Maureen Kelly, in 1976. He has one son (Paul, born 1973) by a previous marriage.

Parliament of the United Kingdom
Preceded by Geoffrey Rhodes	Member of Parliament for Newcastle-upon-Tyne East; October 1974–1983	Succeeded by Nick Brown
