= J. E. Talbot =

John Ellis Talbot (24 April 1906 – 9 January 1967) was a British Building society manager, solicitor and Conservative Party politician.

Talbot was educated at Stubbington House School in Fareham and Rossall School in Fleetwood, Lancashire. He worked first as a solicitor; from 1938 he was joint manager of the Kidderminster Permanent Benefit Building Society. In 1936 he was elected as a Kidderminster councillor; after war service in the Royal Army Observer Corps (1941–1945), he was mayor of the town from 1947 to 1949. He also served on Worcestershire County Council from 1952 to 1955.

He was elected as Member of Parliament (MP) for Brierley Hill, which was immediately to the north of Kidderminster, at the 1959 general election. In 1961 Talbot became director and chairman of the Kidderminster Equitable Building Society; he also followed his interest in gardening and became a Master of the Company of Gardeners (a London Livery company) in 1962. In 1964 he became chairman of the Gardeners Royal Benevolent Society.

Brierley Hill was a marginal constituency and Talbot did well to keep it at the 1966 general election at which there was a swing to Labour. However, he died early the next year, at the age of 60.

Parliament of the United Kingdom
Preceded by Charles Simmons	Member of Parliament for Brierley Hill; 1959–1967	Succeeded by Fergus Montgomery
