= Newcastle upon Tyne East and Wallsend =

UK Parliament constituency (1997–2010, 2024 onwards)

Coordinates: 54.99°N 1.54°W

- Borough constituency for the House of Commons
- Interactive map of boundaries since 2024
- Location within North East England
- County: Tyne and Wear
- Electorate: 76,425 (2024)
- Major settlements: Newcastle upon Tyne (part); Wallsend

Current constituency
- Created: 2024
- Member of Parliament: Mary Glindon (Labour)
- Seats: One
- Created from: Newcastle upon Tyne East; North Tyneside

1997–2010
- Seats: One
- Type of constituency: Borough constituency
- Created from: Newcastle upon Tyne East; Wallsend
- Replaced by: Newcastle upon Tyne East, North Tyneside

Newcastle upon Tyne East and Wallsend is a constituency represented in the House of Commons of the Parliament of the United Kingdom. It elects one Member of Parliament (MP) by the first past the post system of election.

This constituency was created in 1997, abolished in 2010, then re-established under the 2023 review of Westminster constituencies for the 2024 general election. It is currently held by Mary Glindon of the Labour Party, who previously held the abolished constituency of North Tyneside from 2010 to 2024.

== Constituency profile ==
Newcastle upon Tyne East and Wallsend is a constituency in Tyne and Wear, covering the eastern neighbourhoods of Newcastle upon Tyne (Shieldfield, Byker, Heaton, Walker and Walkergate) and the neighbouring town of Wallsend in the borough of North Tyneside.

Newcastle upon Tyne has Roman-era origins as a fortress city and was urbanised during the Industrial Revolution as a leading centre for shipbuilding and heavy industry. The city's eastern suburbs have a history of coal mining and consist largely of dense terraced housing built to house industrial workers. Most of this area falls within the top 10% most-deprived areas in England, although the north of Heaton is generally affluent with large, semi-detached properties. Wallsend also has a history of shipbuilding and coal mining, and like the neighbouring areas, also has high levels of deprivation. The constituency's average house price is lower than the North East England average and less than half the national average.

Residents of the constituency are younger than average; there is a large student population in the neighbourhoods near the city centre, which are close to Newcastle University and Northumbria University. In general, residents have average levels of education and are likely to live in private rented housing. Household income is low and the child poverty rate is high. A high proportion of residents work in the retail, accommodation and food sectors, and the percentage claiming unemployment benefits is in line with the UK-wide figure. White people made up 88% of the population at the 2021 census.

At the local council level, the neighbourhoods close to the city centre are represented by Green Party councillors, the affluent north of Heaton elected Liberal Democrats and the more deprived areas of Walker, Walkergate and Wallsend elected Reform UK and Labour Party representatives. An estimated 56% of voters in Newcastle upon Tyne East and Wallsend supported leaving the European Union in the 2016 referendum, higher than the nationwide figure of 52%.

== History ==
The constituency was created in 1997 by the merger of the bulk of the former seat of Newcastle upon Tyne East and parts of the former seat of Wallsend.

It was represented throughout its first existence by Nick Brown of the Labour Party, who served as Government Chief Whip from 1997 to 1998 and again from 2008 to 2010.

=== Abolition and restoration ===
Under the Fifth Periodic Review of Westminster constituencies which reduced the number of seats in Tyne and Wear from 13 to 12, the constituency was abolished and the Boundary Commission for England revived the constituency of Newcastle upon Tyne East for the 2010 general election. The Wallsend area was transferred to the adjacent North Tyneside constituency.

After more than a decade the constituency was re-established as a result of the 2023 review of Westminster constituencies. The re-created constituency was formed from Newcastle upon Tyne East and North Tyneside (both abolished).

== Boundaries ==
=== 1997–2010 ===
- the City of Newcastle upon Tyne wards of Byker, Dene, Heaton, Monkchester, Walker, and Walkergate; and
- the Borough of North Tyneside wards of Northumberland and Wallsend.

As can be inferred from the name, the constituency consisted of the eastern parts of the City of Newcastle upon Tyne plus Wallsend and the surrounding area.

=== Current ===
The re-established constituency was defined as comprising the follows (as they existed on 1 December 2020):

- The City of Newcastle upon Tyne wards of: Byker; Heaton; Manor Park; Ouseburn; Walker; Walkergate.
- The Metropolitan Borough of North Tyneside wards of: Battle Hill; Howdon; Northumberland; Riverside (polling districts FA and FB); Wallsend.

The Newcastle wards were previously in Newcastle upon Tyne East, and the North Tyneside wards in the constituency of that name - both of which were abolished.

Further to local government boundary reviews in both authorities, the constituency now comprises:

- The City of Newcastle upon Tyne wards or part wards of: Byker; Heaton; Manor Park (nearly all); Ouseburn (majority); Walker; Walkergate.
- The Metropolitan Borough of North Tyneside wards or part wards of: Battle Hill (nearly all); Howdon; Wallsend Central; Wallsend North.

== Members of Parliament ==
=== MPs 1997-2010 ===
Newcastle upon Tyne East and Wallsend prior to 1997

Election	Member	Party
1997	Nick Brown	Labour
2010	Constituency abolished	

=== MPs since 2024 ===
Newcastle upon Tyne East and North Tyneside prior to 2024

Election	Member	Party
2024	Mary Glindon	Labour

== Elections ==
=== Elections in the 2020s ===
General election 2024: Newcastle upon Tyne East and Wallsend
Party	Candidate	Votes	%	±%
Labour	Mary Glindon	21,200	50.1	−9.2
Reform	Janice Richardson	8,383	19.8	+14.9
Green	Matthew Williams	5,257	12.4	+8.6
Conservative	Rosie Hanlon	3,522	8.3	−15.4
Liberal Democrats	Mark Ridyard	2,965	7.0	−1.3
Workers Party	Muhammed Ghori	430	1.0	N/A
Party of Women	Liz Panton	283	0.7	N/A
Communist	Emma-Jane Phillips	186	0.4	N/A
SDP	Robert Malyn	95	0.2	N/A
Majority		12,817	30.3	−5.3
Turnout		42,321	55.4	−9.6
Registered electors		76,425		
Labour win (new seat)				

=== Elections in the 2010s ===
2019 notional result
Party	Vote	%
Labour	29,610	59.3
Conservative	11,817	23.7
Liberal Democrats	4,161	8.3
Brexit	2,452	4.9
Green	1,923	3.8
Turnout	49,963	65.0
Electorate	76,875	

=== Elections in the 2000s ===
General election 2005: Newcastle upon Tyne East and Wallsend
Party	Candidate	Votes	%	±%
Labour	Nick Brown	17,462	55.1	−8.0
Liberal Democrats	David Ord	9,897	31.2	+11.6
Conservative	Norma Dias	3,532	11.1	−0.7
Socialist	William Hopwood	582	1.8	New
Communist	Martin Levy	205	0.6	+0.2
Majority		7,565	23.9	−19.6
Turnout		31,678	50.5	−2.7
Labour hold		Swing	-9.8	

General election 2001: Newcastle upon Tyne East and Wallsend
Party	Candidate	Votes	%	±%
Labour	Nick Brown	20,642	63.1	−8.1
Liberal Democrats	David Ord	6,419	19.6	+9.0
Conservative	Tim Troman	3,873	11.8	−2.1
Green	Andrew Gray	651	2.0	New
Independent	Harash Narang	563	1.7	New
Socialist Labour	Blanch Carpenter	420	1.3	−0.2
Communist	Martin Levy	126	0.4	0.0
Majority		14,223	43.5	−13.8
Turnout		32,694	53.2	−12.5
Labour hold		Swing		

=== Elections in the 1990s ===
General election 1997: Newcastle upon Tyne East and Wallsend
Party	Candidate	Votes	%	±%
Labour	Nick Brown	29,607	71.2	
Conservative	Jeremy Middleton	5,796	13.9	
Liberal Democrats	Graham Morgan	4,415	10.6	
Referendum	Peter Cossins	966	2.3	
Socialist Labour	Blanch Carpenter	642	1.5	
Communist	Martin Levy	163	0.4	
Majority		23,811	57.3	
Turnout		41,589	65.7	
Labour win (new seat)				

== See also ==
- List of parliamentary constituencies in Tyne and Wear
- List of parliamentary constituencies in North East England (region)
