= Fergus Montgomery =

British politician (1927–2013)

Sir Fergus Montgomery

Member of Parliament for Altrincham and Sale
- In office 10 October 1974 – 8 April 1997
- Preceded by: Anthony Barber
- Succeeded by: Graham Brady

Member of Parliament for Brierley Hill
- In office 27 April 1967 – 8 February 1974
- Preceded by: John Ellis Talbot
- Succeeded by: Constituency abolished

Member of Parliament for Newcastle upon Tyne East
- In office 8 October 1959 – 25 September 1964
- Preceded by: Arthur Blenkinsop
- Succeeded by: Geoffrey Rhodes

Personal details
- Born: 25 November 1927 South Shields, England
- Died: 19 March 2013 (aged 85) Spain
- Party: Conservative
- Spouse: Joyce Riddle (m. 1971)

Sir William Fergus Montgomery (25 November 1927 – 19 March 2013) was a British Conservative Member of Parliament (MP) for three separate periods totalling 34 years, each time representing a different constituency.

== Early life ==
Born in South Shields, County Durham, Montgomery was educated at Jarrow Grammar School and Bede College at the University of Durham, and became a teacher in Newcastle upon Tyne in 1950. From 1950 to 1958, he was a councillor on Hebburn Urban District Council. From 1957 to 1958, he was the national chairman of the Young Conservatives, having been vice-chairman from 1954 to 1957.

== Parliamentary career ==
Having unsuccessfully contested the safe Labour seat of Consett in 1955, he was first elected to the House of Commons for Newcastle upon Tyne East at the 1959 general election with a narrow majority of just 98 votes. He is the only Conservative MP to have ever represented Newcastle East. Montgomery narrowly lost the seat to the Labour Party in 1964. He returned to Parliament at a 1967 by-election for Brierley Hill.

Boundary changes which took effect from the February 1974 general election abolished the Brierley Hill constituency. Having unsuccessfully sought selection for South West Staffordshire, Montgomery was selected for the new Dudley West constituency, which partially replaced his old constituency. However, he was unsuccessful, losing the election to Colin Phipps of the Labour Party.

His absence from Parliament was short-lived. The former Chancellor of the Exchequer, Anthony Barber, stood down at the October 1974 general election and Montgomery was selected to contest the constituency of Altrincham and Sale. He was duly elected, and then held the seat until he retired at the 1997 general election.

He was parliamentary private secretary to Margaret Thatcher during her tenure as Secretary of State for Education and when she was Leader of the Opposition.

== Family ==
He married Joyce Riddle, a teacher, cricketer and Conservative local councillor. They had no children. Lady Montgomery was deputy lieutenant and high sheriff of Greater Manchester.

According to Alistair Cooke, Baron Lexden, a Conservative member of the House of Lords, Montgomery had an affair with Russian spy John Vassall. The affair was discovered due MI5 files being declassified in 2022.

== Sources ==
- The BBC Guide to Parliament, BBC Books, 1979, ISBN 0-563-17748-9.

Parliament of the United Kingdom
Preceded by Arthur Blenkinsop	Member of parliament for Newcastle upon Tyne East; 1959–1964	Succeeded by Geoffrey Rhodes
Preceded by John Ellis Talbot	Member of parliament for Brierley Hill; 1967–Feb. 1974	Constituency abolished
Preceded by Anthony Barber	Member of parliament for Altrincham and Sale; Oct. 1974–1997	Succeeded by Graham Brady
