= Mary Glindon =

British politician (born 1957)

Mary Glindon MP
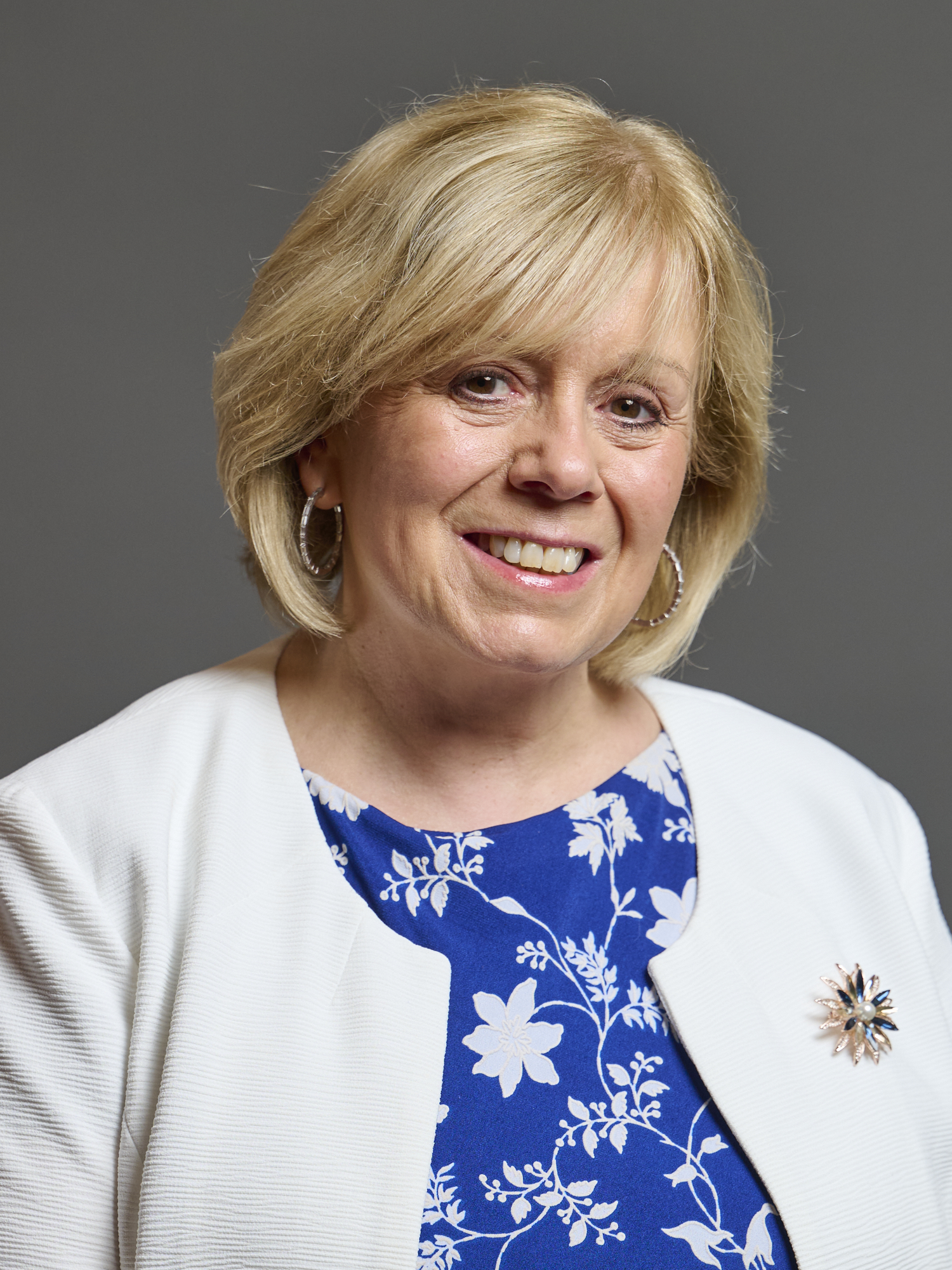
- Official portrait, 2024

Member of Parliament for Newcastle upon Tyne East and Wallsend North Tyneside (2010–2024)
- Incumbent
- Assumed office 6 May 2010
- Preceded by: Stephen Byers
- Majority: 12,817 (30.3%)

Personal details
- Born: Mary Theresa Mulgrove; 13 January 1957 (age 69) Newcastle upon Tyne, England
- Party: Labour
- Spouse: Ray Glindon (m. 2000; died 2021)
- Children: 3
- Education: Newcastle Polytechnic (BSc)
- Website: Official website

Mary Theresa Glindon (née Mulgrove; born 13 January 1957) is a British Labour Party politician who has been Member of Parliament (MP) for Newcastle upon Tyne East and Wallsend since 2024, and previously for North Tyneside from 2010 until the abolition of the constituency in 2024.

== Early life ==
She attended Sacred Heart Grammar School, an RC girls' direct grant grammar school in Fenham, now known as Sacred Heart Catholic High School, Newcastle upon Tyne.

== North Tyneside Councillor ==
Glindon was first elected to represent Battle Hill ward on North Tyneside Council at the 1995 local elections. At the time of her election she went by her maiden name of Mulgrove. Glindon would go on to represent the seat for 15 years and was elected to represent Battle Hill ward 5 times.

During her time as a Councillor Glindon served as the Civic Mayor of North Tyneside.

In 2006 the Elected Mayor of North Tyneside John Harrison appointed Glindon to his Cabinet as the cabinet member for Health and Wellbeing and Older People's Champion.

In 2007 she supported a motion to grant Freedom of the Borough of North Tyneside to Wallsend Boys Club.

== Member of Parliament ==
Glindon was selected in February 2010 as Labour candidate for the Labour safe seat of North Tyneside, while a Councillor for Battle Hill Ward on North Tyneside Council, after the previous Labour MP Stephen Byers announced in November 2009 that he would not contest the next election.

At her first general election in May 2010, she won North Tyneside with a 50.7% vote share.

As an MP her parliamentary voting record has included opposing the 'bedroom tax' and increasing welfare support for those unable to work due to illness or disability. She voted against raising tuition fees to £9000 and against the cut in the Education Maintenance Allowance (EMA) for 16- to 19-year-olds. She has voted for measures to curb climate change and for measures to raise the level of income tax for those earning over £150,000.

In February 2013, Glindon voted against the second reading of the Marriage (Same Sex Couples) Act 2013, and signed a letter saying the Government had no right to redefine marriage. Subsequently, in May 2013 the MP voted against the bill's third and final reading, opposing the legalisation of same-sex marriage within England and Wales.

She has called for a Commons debate on the badger cull, which she opposed.

She is a former member of the Environment, Food and Rural Affairs Select Committee, and the Communities and Local Government Select Committee, as of 2010 and 2013, respectively. She was parliamentary private secretary (PPS) to Mary Creagh when she was Shadow Secretary of State for Transport until 2014. Glindon was re-elected on 8 May 2015, with 26,191 votes and 55.9% share of the votes cast.

She supported Owen Smith in the failed attempt to replace Jeremy Corbyn in the 2016 Labour leadership election.

Glindon was elected in the constituency of Newcastle upon Tyne East and Wallsend in the 2024 general election with a majority of 12,817, following the abolition of the North Tyneside constituency.

Glindon was one of 42 MPs to sign an open letter opposing proposed Welfare cuts by the government

Between 2020 and 2024 Glindon was an opposition Whip in Parliament; she did not carry that role forward in government.

=== Tobacco industry links ===
Article 5.3 of the WHO Framework Convention on Tobacco Control (FCTC) requires the UK government to protect public health policies from the "commercial and other vested interests of the tobacco industry". Glindon has been criticised for hosting events in parliament on behalf of Japan Tobacco International.

=== Parliamentary roles ===
She is a member of the House of Commons' All-Party Parliamentary Pro-Life Group, and of the Labour Friends of Israel and Labour Friends of Palestine and the Middle East.

== Personal life ==
Glindon is a practising Roman Catholic. She married Ray Glindon, also a councillor, in 2000. She has one daughter, a step-daughter and a step-son. Glindon was widowed in April 2021.

Parliament of the United Kingdom
Preceded by Stephen Byers	Member of Parliament for North Tyneside; 2010–2024	Constituency abolished
New constituency	Member of Parliament for Newcastle upon Tyne East and Wallsend; 2024–present	Incumbent
