= Brierley Hill (constituency) =

Parliamentary constituency in the United Kingdom, 1950–1974

- Former county constituency for the House of Commons

1950–February 1974
- Seats: one
- Created from: Cannock and Kingswinford
- Replaced by: Dudley West, Wolverhampton South West, South West Staffordshire & Halesowen and Stourbridge

Brierley Hill parliamentary constituency was located in the West Midlands of England. It returned one Member of Parliament (MP) to the House of Commons of the Parliament of the United Kingdom, elected by the first past the post system.

== History ==
The constituency was created for the 1950 general election, and abolished for the February 1974 general election.

== Boundaries ==
The seat was named after a town in the historic county of Staffordshire in the West Midlands of England.

It consisted of four local government areas, the Urban Districts of Amblecote, Brierley Hill, and Tettenhall as well as the Rural District of Seisdon, as they existed in 1948.

Before 1950 much of the area (Amblecote and Brierley Hill) had been part of the Kingswinford constituency. The rest (Tettenhall and Seisdon) were part of Cannock constituency.

In the redistribution which took effect in early 1974, this constituency was abolished. There had been changes in local government arrangements since 1950, so most of the area of the old seat had been divided between the County Boroughs of Dudley and Wolverhampton. The Brierley Hill ward of Dudley became part of the Dudley West constituency, whereas the Tettenhall Regis and Tettenhall Wightwick wards of Wolverhampton were part of the Wolverhampton South West seat. Seisdon became part of the South West Staffordshire division. Most of Amblecote had been included in the Worcestershire Municipal Borough of Stourbridge, so it became part of the Halesowen and Stourbridge parliamentary constituency.

== Members of Parliament ==
Election	Member	Party	Notes
1950	Charles Simmons	Labour	
1959	John Talbot	Conservative	Died January 1967
1967 by-election	Fergus Montgomery	Conservative	
Feb 1974	constituency abolished		

== Elections ==
=== Elections in the 1950s ===
General election 1950: Brierley Hill
Party	Candidate	Votes	%	±%
Labour	Charles Simmons	24,302	50.32	
Conservative	Rolf Dudley-Williams	19,665	40.72	
Liberal	Thomas Patrick Hanley	4,329	8.96	
Majority		4,637	9.60	
Turnout		48,296	85.45	
Labour win (new seat)				

General election 1951: Brierley Hill
Party	Candidate	Votes	%	±%
Labour	Charles Simmons	25,510	52.36	
Conservative	John Dalley	23,212	47.64	
Majority		2,298	4.72	
Turnout		48,722	85.00	
Labour hold		Swing		

General election 1955: Brierley Hill
Party	Candidate	Votes	%	±%
Labour	Charles Simmons	25,013	50.97	
Conservative	W Howard Green	24,064	49.03	
Majority		949	1.93	
Turnout		49,077	78.93	
Labour hold		Swing		

General election 1959: Brierley Hill
Party	Candidate	Votes	%	±%
Conservative	J. E. Talbot	31,202	53.55	
Labour	Charles Simmons	27,069	46.45	
Majority		4,133	7.10	N/A
Turnout		58,271	81.89	
Conservative gain from Labour		Swing		

=== Elections in the 1960s ===
General election 1964: Brierley Hill
Party	Candidate	Votes	%	±%
Conservative	J. E. Talbot	33,370	52.01	
Labour	Peter Archer	28,968	45.15	
Independent	William Brown	1,820	2.84	New
Majority		4,402	6.86	
Turnout		64,158	79.98	
Conservative hold		Swing		

- Anti-Common Market

General election 1966: Brierley Hill
Party	Candidate	Votes	%	±%
Conservative	J. E. Talbot	34,026	51.18	
Labour	Katharine C Rogers	32,459	48.82	
Majority		1,567	2.36	
Turnout		66,485	78.95	
Conservative hold		Swing		

1967 Brierley Hill by-election
Party	Candidate	Votes	%	±%
Conservative	Fergus Montgomery	31,371	53.75	+2.57
Labour	Derek Forwood	21,151	36.24	−12.58
Liberal	Michael Steed	4,536	7.77	New
All Party Alliance	John Creasey	1,305	2.24	New
Majority		10,220	17.51	+15.15
Turnout		58,363		
Conservative hold		Swing		

=== Elections in the 1970s ===
General election 1970: Brierley Hill
Party	Candidate	Votes	%	±%
Conservative	Fergus Montgomery	43,440	60.63	
Labour	Thomas Pritchard	28,203	39.37	
Majority		15,237	21.27	
Turnout		71,643	73.29	
Conservative hold		Swing		

== See also ==
- List of former United Kingdom Parliament constituencies

== Bibliography ==
- Craig, F. W. S., ed. (1971). British Parliamentary Election Results 1950–1970. Glasgow: Political Reference Publications. ISBN 978-0900178023.
- Craig, F. W. S., ed. (1972). Boundaries of Parliamentary Constituencies 1885–1972. Political Reference Publications. ISBN 978-0900178092.
- Stenton, M; Lees, S, eds. (1981). Who's Who of British Members of Parliament, Volume IV 1945-1979. Harvester Press.
- Leigh Rayment's Historical List of MPs – Constituencies beginning with "B" (part 5)
