= Robin Donkin =

British historical geographer (1928–2006)

Robert Arthur "Robin" Donkin, FBA (28 October 1928 – 1 February 2006) was an English historian and geographer who served as a reader in historical geography in the University of Cambridge's Department of Geography in 1990. A fellow of the British Academy, Donkin published works on a wide range of subjects, including Cistercian monasteries, agricultural terracing, the history of pearls and pearl fishing, the Muscovy duck, the Guinea fowl, and the history of spices and aromatics.

== Early life ==
Robin Donkin was born in 1928 in the town of Morpeth, Northumberland. He received his education at Jarrow Grammar School, and later studied geography at King's College, Newcastle upon Tyne. At Durham University, Donkin completed his doctorate under M.R.G. Conzen, published later in 1957 as The Cistercian Contribution to the Geography of England and Wales in the Twelfth and Thirteenth Centuries.

Donkin also served in the British Armed Forces as a Lieutenant in the Royal Artillery. His National Service postings included Egypt and Jordan, where he saw field work. He was elected King George VI Research Fellow at the University of California, Berkeley in 1955. It was here that he was influenced by the American cultural geographer Carl O. Sauer, and developed interest in agricultural origins and the aboriginal New World. Donkin returned to Britain in 1956, and working at the University of Edinburgh Geography Department for the next two years.

== Later contributions ==
Donkin published a number of papers on Cistercian farming activity, introducing a new geographical dimension to monastic studies. Among his notable contributions to the field of historical geography is a 60-page synthesis on "Changes in the Early Middle Ages", which was contributed by him to the A New Historical Geography of England, published in 1973. Academic interest in Middle America eventually led Donkin to Cambridge University, where he earned a Fellowship at Jesus College, Cambridge, and served as a distinguished historical geographer.

Donkin's work Beyond Price: pearls and pearl-fishing, origins to the Age of Discoveries in 1998 – a work containing a mammoth 60 page bibliography – was published as a memoir of the American Philosophical Society. In 2003, Donkin produced Between East and West: the Moluccas and the traffic in spices up to the arrival of Europeans, a book on maritime explorations in the Atlantic Ocean and the Indian Ocean.

Donkin traveled to North Africa, Middle America, South America, South India, South China and to Chinese Turkestan. His final work was an incomplete analysis of the cultural geography of maize.

The Independent, (London), 10 May 2006 summed up Donkin's life as follows:

Robert Arthur Donkin, geographer: born Morpeth, Northumberland 28 October 1928' King George VI Memorial Fellow, University of California, Berkeley 1955-56' Assistant Lecturer, Department of Geography, Edinburgh University 1956-58' Lecturer, Department of Geography, Birmingham University 1958-70' Lecturer in the Geography of Latin America, Cambridge University 1971–90, Reader in Historical Geography 1990-96 (Emeritus)' Fellow, Jesus College, Cambridge 1972- 96 (Emeritus), Tutor 1975-96' FBA1985' married 1970 Jennifer Kennedy (one daughter)' died Cambridge 1 February 2006.
