= Newcastle upon Tyne East =

UK Parliament constituency (1918–1997; 2010–2024)

- Former borough constituency for the House of Commons
- 2010–2024 boundary of Newcastle upon Tyne East in Tyne and Wear

- Location of Tyne and Wear within England
- County: Tyne and Wear
- Electorate: 65,203 (December 2010)
- Major settlements: Newcastle upon Tyne

2010–2024
- Seats: One
- Created from: Newcastle upon Tyne East and Wallsend; Tyne Bridge
- Replaced by: Newcastle upon Tyne East and Wallsend; Newcastle upon Tyne North (part); Newcastle upon Tyne Central and West (minor part)

1918–1997
- Seats: One
- Type of constituency: Borough constituency
- Created from: Newcastle upon Tyne, Tyneside
- Replaced by: Newcastle upon Tyne East and Wallsend

Newcastle upon Tyne East was a constituency (Note: A borough constituency (for the purposes of election expenses and type of returning officer)) of the House of Commons of the UK Parliament. It was held by Nick Brown, an independent formerly of the Labour Party, from its recreation in 2010 until its abolition for the 2024 general election. (Note: As with all constituencies, the constituency elects one Member of Parliament (MP) by the first past the post system of election at least every five years.)

Under the 2023 Periodic Review of Westminster constituencies, Jesmond was transferred to Newcastle upon Tyne North, with the rest of the seat being absorbed once again into the re-established constituency of Newcastle upon Tyne East and Wallsend.

== History ==
Parliament created this constituency in the Representation of the People Act 1918 as one of four divisions of the parliamentary borough of Newcastle-upon-Tyne, which had previously been represented by one two-member seat. Its first creation was eventually absorbed in 1997 by the new Newcastle upon Tyne East and Wallsend seat. Parliament accepted the Boundary Commission's Fifth Periodic Review of Westminster constituencies which recommended the re-creation of the seat for the 2010 general election.

Apart from a period in 1981-1983 following the defection of local member Mike Thomas to the SDP, successive members of the Labour Party have represented this constituency in Westminster since 1964 (including its interim successors). Since 1966, the double-digit majorities won in all three previous forms of the constituency and today's constituency suggest they have been safe seats.

Ahead of the 2010 election the seat was considered at risk for the Labour Party, after the Liberal Democrat, achieved victories in local elections in areas covered by the constituency. In the event, Labour's Nick Brown held the seat with the smallest majority in 44 years, and in the simultaneous local elections Labour benefitted from the associated increased turnout to take the Walkergate council ward from the Liberal Democrats.

In 2015, the Liberal Democrat vote collapsed in line with the rest of the country and in 2017, Brown achieved a record margin of 46.3%. In 2019 the constituency was one of only a handful of Labour-held seats not contested by the Brexit Party.

== Boundaries ==
=== 1918–1950 ===
- The County Borough of Newcastle upon Tyne wards of Byker, St Anthony's, St Lawrence, and Walker.

Included the former Urban District of Walker which had been absorbed into the County Borough in 1904 and had previously been part of the abolished Tyneside constituency.

=== 1950–1983 ===
- The County Borough of Newcastle upon Tyne wards of Dene, Heaton, St Lawrence, Walker, and Walkergate.

Boundaries redrawn to take account of expansion of the County Borough and redistribution of wards. Expanded northwards, gaining Dene and Heaton from Newcastle upon Tyne North. Byker and St Anthony's transferred to Newcastle upon Tyne Central.

=== 1983–1997 ===
- The City of Newcastle upon Tyne wards of Byker, Dene, Heaton, Monkchester, Sandyford, Walker, and Walkergate.

Regained Byker and St Anthony's with the addition of the Battle Field area from Newcastle-upon-Tyne Centre. Sandyford transferred from Newcastle-upon-Tyne North.

On abolition, the Sandyford ward was transferred to Newcastle upon Tyne Central; the remainder of the constituency comprised the bulk of the new seat of Newcastle upon Tyne East and Wallsend.

=== 2010–2024 ===
Map of boundaries 2010-2024
- The City of Newcastle upon Tyne wards of Byker, Dene, North Heaton, North Jesmond, Ouseburn, South Heaton, South Jesmond, Walker, and Walkergate.

Following their review of parliamentary representation in Tyne and Wear in 2007, the Boundary Commission for England re-created the constituency of Newcastle upon Tyne East, which took effect at the 2010 general election. The new seat largely replaced the former Newcastle upon Tyne East and Wallsend seat, with the Wallsend element being transferred to the adjacent North Tyneside constituency. The boundaries were similar to those in place before 1997, with the addition of Jesmond from Newcastle upon Tyne Central.

== Members of Parliament ==
=== MPs 1918–1997 ===
Election	Member	Party
1918	Harry Barnes	Coalition Liberal
1919	Harry Barnes	Liberal
1922	Joseph Nicholas Bell	Labour
1923 by-election	Arthur Henderson	Labour
1923	Sir Robert Aske	Liberal
1924	Martin Henry Connolly	Labour
1929	Sir Robert Aske	Liberal
1931	Sir Robert Aske	National Liberal
1945	Arthur Blenkinsop	Labour
1959	Fergus Montgomery	Conservative
1964	Geoffrey Rhodes	Labour Co-operative
Oct 1974	Mike Thomas	Labour Co-operative
1981	Mike Thomas	SDP
1983	Nick Brown	Labour
1997	Constituency abolished: see Newcastle upon Tyne East & Wallsend	

=== MPs since 2010–2024 ===
Election	Member	Party
2010	Nick Brown	Labour
2023	Nick Brown	Independent
2024	Constituency abolished: see Newcastle upon Tyne East & Wallsend	

== Elections ==
=== Elections in the 2010s ===
General election 2019: Newcastle upon Tyne East
Party	Candidate	Votes	%	±%
Labour	Nick Brown	26,049	60.1	−7.5
Conservative	Robin Gwynn	10,586	24.4	+3.1
Liberal Democrats	Wendy Taylor	4,535	10.5	+4.3
Green	Nick Hartley	2,195	5.1	+3.3
Majority		15,463	35.7	−10.6
Turnout		43,365	68.0	+1.2
Labour hold		Swing	−5.3	

General election 2017: Newcastle upon Tyne East
Party	Candidate	Votes	%	±%
Labour	Nick Brown	28,127	67.6	+18.2
Conservative	Simon Kitchen	8,866	21.3	+3.7
Liberal Democrats	Wendy Taylor	2,574	6.2	−4.8
UKIP	Anthony Sanderson	1,315	3.2	−9.3
Green	Alistair Ford	755	1.8	−6.9
Majority		19,261	46.3	+14.5
Turnout		41,637	66.8	+5.7
Labour hold		Swing	+7.2	

General election 2015: Newcastle upon Tyne East
Party	Candidate	Votes	%	±%
Labour	Nick Brown	19,378	49.4	+4.4
Conservative	Duncan Crute	6,884	17.6	+1.6
UKIP	David Robinson-Young	4,910	12.5	New
Liberal Democrats	Wendy Taylor	4,332	11.0	−22.3
Green	Andrew Gray	3,426	8.7	+7.1
TUSC	Paul Phillips	170	0.4	New
Communist	Mollie Stevenson	122	0.3	−0.2
Majority		12,494	31.8	+20.1
Turnout		39,222	61.1	+2.4
Labour hold		Swing		

General election 2010: Newcastle upon Tyne East
Party	Candidate	Votes	%	±%
Labour	Nick Brown*	17,043	45.0	−7.7
Liberal Democrats	Wendy Taylor	12,590	33.3	+1.5
Conservative	Dominic Llewellyn	6,068	16.0	+3.0
BNP	Alan Spence	1,342	3.5	New
Green	Andrew Gray	620	1.6	New
Communist	Martin Levy	177	0.5	−0.1
Majority		4,453	11.7	+9.2
Turnout		37,840	58.7	+3.4
Labour hold		Swing	−4.6	

* Served as MP for Newcastle upon Tyne East and Wallsend, 1997–2010

=== Elections in the 1990s ===
General election 1992: Newcastle upon Tyne East
Party	Candidate	Votes	%	±%
Labour	Nick Brown	24,342	60.2	+3.7
Conservative	Jeremy R. Lucas	10,465	25.9	−0.7
Liberal Democrats	Alan Thompson	4,883	12.1	−3.9
Green	Gareth L.N. Edwards	744	1.8	New
Majority		13,877	34.3	+4.4
Turnout		40,434	70.7	+0.1
Labour hold		Swing	+2.3	

=== Elections in the 1980s ===
General election 1987: Newcastle upon Tyne East
Party	Candidate	Votes	%	±%
Labour	Nick Brown	23,677	56.5	+11.0
Conservative	Jenefer Riley	11,177	26.6	−1.2
Liberal (SDP)	Peter Arnold	6,728	16.0	−10.7
Communist	Joseph Keith	362	0.9	New
Majority		12,500	29.9	+12.2
Turnout		41,944	70.6	−0.4
Labour hold		Swing	+6.1	

General election 1983: Newcastle upon Tyne East
Party	Candidate	Votes	%	±%
Labour	Nick Brown	19,247	45.5	−9.6
Conservative	Arthur T. Barnes	11,755	27.8	−8.7
SDP (Liberal)	Mike Thomas	11,293	26.7	+18.2
Majority		7,492	17.7	−0.9
Turnout		42,295	71.0	+3.0
Labour hold		Swing	−0.5	

=== Elections in the 1970s ===
General election 1979: Newcastle upon Tyne East
Party	Candidate	Votes	%	±%
Labour Co-op	Mike Thomas	18,257	55.1	+2.3
Conservative	Derek Conway	12,087	36.5	+2.7
Liberal	J. Nelson	2,818	8.5	−4.9
Majority		6,170	18.6	−0.5
Turnout		33,162	68.0	−3.8
Labour hold		Swing	−0.4	

General election October 1974: Newcastle upon Tyne East
Party	Candidate	Votes	%	±%
Labour	Mike Thomas	17,312	52.84	
Conservative	M. Hill	11,063	33.76	
Liberal	T. Symonds	4,391	13.40	New
Majority		6,249	19.08	
Turnout		32,766	71.77	
Labour hold		Swing		

General election February 1974: Newcastle upon Tyne East
Party	Candidate	Votes	%	±%
Labour Co-op	Geoffrey Rhodes	20,439	58.76	
Conservative	M. Hill	14,347	41.24	
Majority		6,092	17.52	
Turnout		34,786	76.87	
Labour Co-op hold		Swing		

General election 1970: Newcastle upon Tyne East
Party	Candidate	Votes	%	±%
Labour Co-op	Geoffrey Rhodes	20,780	58.4	−1.4
Conservative	Philip E. Heseltine	14,832	41.7	+1.4
Majority		5,948	16.7	−2.8
Turnout		35,612	75.6	−4.9
Labour Co-op hold		Swing		

=== Elections in the 1960s ===
General election 1966: Newcastle upon Tyne East
Party	Candidate	Votes	%	±%
Labour Co-op	Geoffrey Rhodes	22,408	59.77	
Conservative	Thomas T. Hubble	15,082	40.23	
Majority		7,326	19.54	
Turnout		37,490	80.51	
Labour Co-op hold		Swing		

General election 1964: Newcastle upon Tyne East
Party	Candidate	Votes	%	±%
Labour Co-op	Geoffrey Rhodes	21,200	52.02	
Conservative	Fergus Montgomery	19,556	47.98	
Majority		1,644	4.04	N/A
Turnout		40,756	83.37	
Labour Co-op gain from Conservative		Swing		

=== Elections in the 1950s ===
General election 1959: Newcastle upon Tyne East
Party	Candidate	Votes	%	±%
Conservative	Fergus Montgomery	21,457	50.11	
Labour	Arthur Blenkinsop	21,359	49.89	
Majority		98	0.22	N/A
Turnout		42,816	84.59	
Conservative gain from Labour		Swing		

General election 1955: Newcastle upon Tyne East
Party	Candidate	Votes	%	±%
Labour	Arthur Blenkinsop	22,816	52.08	
Conservative	George F.H. Walker	20,994	47.92	
Majority		1,822	4.16	
Turnout		43,810	77.60	
Labour hold		Swing		

General election 1951: Newcastle upon Tyne East
Party	Candidate	Votes	%	±%
Labour	Arthur Blenkinsop	25,621	52.86	
Conservative	Alfred Edwards	22,850	47.14	
Majority		2,771	5.72	
Turnout		48,471	84.59	
Labour hold		Swing		

General election 1950: Newcastle upon Tyne East
Party	Candidate	Votes	%	±%
Labour	Arthur Blenkinsop	24,694	51.45	
Conservative	P.G. Williams	18,866	39.30	
Liberal	William McKeag	4,440	9.25	New
Majority		5,828	12.15	
Turnout		48,000	83.67	
Labour hold		Swing		

=== Elections in the 1940s ===
General election 1945: Newcastle upon Tyne East
Party	Candidate	Votes	%	±%
Labour	Arthur Blenkinsop	26,116	68.93	
National Liberal	Richard O'Sullivan	11,774	31.07	
Majority		14,342	37.86	N/A
Turnout		37,890	73.13	
Labour gain from National Liberal		Swing		

=== Elections in the 1930s ===
General election 1935: Newcastle upon Tyne East
Party	Candidate	Votes	%	±%
National Liberal	Robert Aske	23,146	58.6	−4.8
Labour	Bernard Benjamin Gillis	16,322	41.4	+4.8
Majority		6,824	17.2	−9.6
Turnout		39,468	81.3	−5.2
National Liberal hold		Swing		

General election 1931: Newcastle upon Tyne East
Party	Candidate	Votes	%	±%
National Liberal	Robert Aske	24,522	63.4	New
Labour	Maurice Alexander	14,176	36.6	−12.1
Majority		10,346	26.8	N/A
Turnout		38,728	86.5	+7.1
National Liberal gain from Liberal		Swing		

=== Elections in the 1920s ===
General election 1929: Newcastle upon Tyne East
Party	Candidate	Votes	%	±%
Liberal	Robert Aske	17,856	51.3	+6.2
Labour	Martin Connolly	16,921	48.7	+2.3
Majority		935	2.6	N/A
Turnout		34,777	79.4	−4.5
Registered electors		43,797		
Liberal gain from Labour		Swing	+2.0	

General election 1924: Newcastle upon Tyne East
Party	Candidate	Votes	%	±%
Labour	Martin Connolly	13,120	46.4	−1.3
Liberal	Robert Aske	12,776	45.1	−7.2
Unionist	William Temple	2,420	8.5	New
Majority		344	1.3	N/A
Turnout		28,316	83.9	+10.7
Registered electors		33,737		
Labour gain from Liberal		Swing	+3.0	

General election 1923: Newcastle upon Tyne East
Party	Candidate	Votes	%	±%
Liberal	Robert Aske	12,656	52.3	+22.3
Labour	Arthur Henderson	11,532	47.7	+4.6
Majority		1,124	4.6	N/A
Turnout		24,188	73.2	−0.5
Registered electors		33,066		
Liberal gain from Labour		Swing	+8.9	

1923 Newcastle-upon-Tyne East by-election
Party	Candidate	Votes	%	±%
Labour	Arthur Henderson	11,066	45.7	+2.6
Liberal	Harry Barnes	6,682	27.6	−2.4
Unionist	Robert Gee	6,480	26.7	New
Majority		4,384	18.1	+5.0
Turnout		24,228	76.4	+2.7
Registered electors		31,703		
Labour hold		Swing	+2.5	

- Death of Joseph Bell

J.N. Bell

General election 1922: Newcastle upon Tyne East
Party	Candidate	Votes	%	±%
Labour	Joseph Bell	10,084	43.1	+8.4
Liberal	Harry Barnes	6,999	30.0	New
National Liberal	Gilbert Stone	6,273	26.9	–28.1
Majority		3,085	13.1	N/A
Turnout		23,356	73.7	+25.0
Registered electors		31,703		
Labour gain from National Liberal		Swing	+18.3	

=== Elections in the 1910s ===
Harry Barnes

General election 1918: Newcastle upon Tyne East
Party		Candidate	Votes	%
C	Coalition Liberal	Harry Barnes	8,682	58.1
	Labour	Walter Hudson	5,195	34.7
	Independent	John Thompson*	1,079	7.2
Majority			3,487	23.4
Turnout			14,956	48.7
Registered electors			30,719	
	National Liberal win (new seat)			
C indicates candidate endorsed by the coalition government.

* Thompson was initially supported by the local branch of the National Federation of Discharged and Demobilized Sailors and Soldiers but this was later revoked.

== See also ==
- List of parliamentary constituencies in Tyne and Wear
- History of parliamentary constituencies and boundaries in Tyne and Wear
- History of parliamentary constituencies and boundaries in Northumberland

== Sources ==
- Craig, F. W. S. (1983) [1969]. British parliamentary election results 1918–1949 (3rd ed.). Chichester: Parliamentary Research Services. ISBN 0-900178-06-X.
