= Parliamentary representation from Middlesex =

The historic county of Middlesex in south east England was represented in Parliament from the 13th century. This article provides a list of constituencies constituting the Parliamentary representation from Middlesex.

From early times the City of London and the rest of Middlesex had different sheriffs and other administrative arrangements. However apart from this the historic county was not divided, for administrative purposes, until 1889. In that year the urbanised east of the county became part of the new administrative county of London; administered by the London County Council. The less built up north and west of the county formed the administrative county of Middlesex; administered by Middlesex County Council.

In 1965 the Greater London Council was formed. Greater London absorbed the administrative county of London and surrounding territory, including almost all of the administrative county of Middlesex. The south west part of the historic county (then the Staines Urban District and the Sunbury on Thames Urban District but from 1974 the borough of Spelthorne) was transferred to the administrative county of Surrey. A smaller part of the historic county, in the Potters Bar area, was transferred to the administrative county of Hertfordshire. In 1995 the village of Poyle, which had been a small area in the north of Spelthorne, was transferred to Berkshire.

The first part of this article covers the constituencies wholly or predominantly within the area of the historic county of Middlesex, both before and after the administrative changes of 1889 and 1965. The second part refers to constituencies mostly in another historic county, which included some territory from the historic county of Middlesex. The summaries section only refers to the constituencies included in the first section of the constituency list.

== List of constituencies ==
Article names are followed by (UK Parliament constituency). The constituencies which existed in 1707 were those previously represented in the Parliament of England.

In the distribution of seats in effect from 1974 to 1983 the official name of the Greater London seats included a London Borough prefix. In most cases this is not used in the article names. There were also instances when a distinctive constituency name had, at different periods, been prefixed by different borough names. In those cases the distinctive constituency name alone is usually used in the article name. See the notes column for further details.

Key to abbreviations:-

- (Type) BC Borough constituency, CC County constituency, UC University constituency.
- (Administrative County in Notes) B shire county of Berkshire, GL Greater London (from 1965), H administrative/shire county of Hertfordshire (from 1965), L administrative county of London (1889–1965), M1 historic county of Middlesex (to 1889), M2 administrative county of Middlesex (1889–1965), S administrative/shire county of Surrey (from 1965).

=== Constituencies wholly or predominantly in the historic county ===
Constituency	Type	From	To	MPs	Notes
Acton	CC (1918–1950)	1918	1983	1	M2, GL: Ealing, 1974-1983
Acton	BC (1950–1983)	1918	1983	1	M2, GL: Ealing, 1974-1983
Barons Court	BC	1955	1974	1	L, GL
Bethnal Green	BC	1950	1974	1	L, GL
Bethnal Green and Bow	BC	1974	1983	1	GL: Tower Hamlets, 1974-1983
Bethnal Green and Bow	BC	1997	*	1	GL: Tower Hamlets, 1974-1983
Bethnal Green and Stepney	BC	1983	1997	1	GL
Bethnal Green North East	BC	1885	1950	1	M1, L
Bethnal Green South West	BC	1885	1950	1	M1, L
Bow and Bromley	BC	1885	1950	1	M1, L: Tower Hamlets, 1885–1918; Poplar, 1918–1950
Bow and Poplar	BC	1983	1997	1	GL
Brent Central	BC	next	*	1	GL
Brent East	BC	1974	next	1	GL
Brent North	BC	1974	*	1	GL
Brent South	BC	1974	next	1	GL
Brentford	CC	1885	1918	1	M1, M2
Brentford and Chiswick	CC	1918	1974	1	M2, GL
Brentford and Isleworth	BC	1974	*	1	GL: Hounslow, 1974-1983
Chelsea	BC	1868	1997	2 (1868–1885)	M1, L, GL: Kensington and Chelsea, 1974-1983
Chelsea	BC	1868	1997	1 (1885–1997)	M1, L, GL: Kensington and Chelsea, 1974-1983
Chelsea and Fulham	BC	next	*	1	GL
Ealing	CC (1885–1918)	1885	1945	1	M1, M2
Ealing	BC (1918–1945)	1885	1945	1	M1, M2
Ealing Acton	BC	1983	1997	1	GL
Ealing, Acton and Shepherd's; Bush	BC	1997	next	1	GL
Ealing Central and Acton	BC	next	*	1	GL
Ealing East	BC	1945	1950	1	M2
Ealing North	BC	1950	next	1	M2, GL
Ealing South	BC	1950	1974	1	M2, GL
Ealing Southall	BC	1983	*	1	GL
Ealing West	BC	1945	1950	1	M2
Edmonton	BC	1918	*	1	M2, GL: Enfield, 1974-1983
Enfield	CC	1885	1950	1	M1, M2
Enfield East	BC	1950	1974	1	M2, GL
Enfield North	BC	1974	*	1	GL
Enfield Southgate	BC	1983	*	1	GL
Enfield West	BC	1950	1974	1	M2, GL
Feltham	BC	1955	1974	1	M2, GL
Feltham and Heston	BC	1974	*	1	GL: Hounslow, 1974-1983
Finchley	CC (1918–1950)	1918	1997	1	M2, GL: Barnet, 1974-1983
Finchley	BC (1950–1997)	1918	1997	1	M2, GL: Barnet, 1974-1983
Finchley and Golders Green	BC	1997	*	1	GL
Finsbury	BC	1832	1885	2	M1
Finsbury	BC	1918	1950	1	L
Finsbury Central	BC	1885	1918	1	M1, L
Finsbury East	BC	1885	1918	1	M1, L
Fulham	BC	1885	1918	1	M1, L, GL: Hammersmith, 1974-1983
Fulham	BC	1955	1997	1	M1, L, GL: Hammersmith, 1974-1983
Fulham East	BC	1918	1955	1	L
Fulham West	BC	1918	1955	1	L
Hackney	BC	1868	1885	2	M1
Hackney Central	BC	1885	1950	1	M1, L, GL
Hackney Central	BC	1955	1983	1	M1, L, GL
Hackney North	BC	1885	1950	1	M1, L
Hackney North and Stoke; Newington	BC	1950	*	1	L, GL: Inc. Stoke Newington & Hackney North 1950-74
Hackney South	BC	1885	1955	1	M1, L
Hackney South and Shoreditch	BC	1974	*	1	GL
Hammersmith	BC	1885	1918	1	M1, L, GL
Hammersmith	BC	1983	1997	1	M1, L, GL
Hammersmith	BC	next	*	1	M1, L, GL
Hammersmith and Fulham	BC	1997	next	1	GL
Hammersmith North	BC	1918	1983	1	L, GL
Hammersmith South	BC	1918	1955	1	L
Hampstead	BC	1885	1983	1	M1, L, GL: Camden, 1974-1983
Hampstead and Highgate	BC	1983	next	1	GL
Hampstead and Kilburn	BC	next	*	1	GL
Harrow	CC	1885	1945	1	M1, M2
Harrow Central	BC	1950	1983	1	M2, GL
Harrow East	BC	1945	*	1	M2, GL
Harrow West	BC	1945	*	1	M2, GL
Hayes and Harlington	BC	1950	*	1	M2, GL: Hillingdon, 1974-83
Hendon	CC	1918	1945	1	M2, GL
Hendon	BC	1997	next	1	M2, GL
Hendon North	BC	1945	1997	1	M2, GL: Barnet, 1974-1983
Hendon South	BC	1945	1997	1	M2, GL: Barnet, 1974-1983
Heston and Isleworth	BC	1945	1974	1	M2, GL
Holborn	BC	1885	1950	1	M1, L: Inc. Finsbury, 1885–1918
Holborn and St Pancras	BC	1983	*	1	GL
Holborn and St Pancras South	BC	1950	1983	1	L, GL: Camden, 1974-1983
Hornsey	CC (1885–1918)	1885	1983	1	M2, GL: Haringey, 1974-1983
Hornsey	BC (1918–1983)	1885	1983	1	M2, GL: Haringey, 1974-1983
Hornsey and Wood Green	BC	1983	*	1	GL
Islington Central	BC	1974	1983	1	GL
Islington East	BC	1885	1974	1	M1, L, GL
Islington North	BC	1885	*	1	M1, L, GL
Islington South	BC	1885	1950	1	M1, L
Islington South and Finsbury	BC	1974	*	1	GL
Islington South West	BC	1950	1974	1	L, GL
Islington West	BC	1885	1950	1	M1, L
Kensington	BC	1974	1997	1	GL: Kensington and Chelsea, 1974-1983
Kensington	BC	next	*	1	GL: Kensington and Chelsea, 1974-1983
Kensington and Chelsea	BC	1997	next	1	GL
Kensington North	BC	1885	1974	1	M1, L, GL
Kensington South	BC	1885	1974	1	M1, L, GL
Limehouse	BC	1885	1950	1	M1, L: Tower Hamlets, 1885–1918; Stepney, 1918–1950
Cities of London and Westminster	BC	1950	1974	1	L, GL: See City of London and Westminster South
Cities of London and Westminster	BC	1997	*	1	L, GL: See City of London and Westminster South
City of London	BC	1298	1950	4 (1295-1654)	M1, L ^{1}, GL
City of London	BC	1298	1950	6 (1654–1658)	M1, L ^{1}, GL
City of London	BC	1298	1950	4 (1658–1885)	M1, L ^{1}, GL
City of London	BC	1298	1950	2 (1885–1950)	M1, L ^{1}, GL
City of London and Westminster; South	BC	1974	1997	1	GL: See Cities of London and Westminster
London University	UC	1868	1950	1	M1, L
Marylebone	BC	1832	1885	2	M1
Marylebone East	BC	1885	1918	1	M1, L
Marylebone West	BC	1885	1918	1	M1, L
Middlesex	CC	1290	1885	2 (1290-1654)	M1
Middlesex	CC	1290	1885	4 (1654–1658)	M1
Middlesex	CC	1290	1885	2 (1658–1885)	M1
Mile End	BC	1885	1950	1	M1, L: Tower Hamlets, 1885–1918; Stepney, 1918–1950
Paddington	BC	1974	1983	1	GL
Paddington North	BC	1885	1974	1	M1, L, GL
Paddington South	BC	1885	1974	1	M1, L, GL
Poplar	BC	1885	1974	1	M1, L, GL: Tower Hamlets, 1885–1918
Poplar and Canning Town	BC	1997	next	1	GL: Inc. part of historic county of Essex
Poplar and Limehouse	BC	next	*	1	GL
South Poplar	BC	1918	1950	1	L ^{2}
Regent's Park and Kensington North	BC	1997	next	1	GL
Ruislip-Northwood	BC	1950	next	1	M2, GL: Hillingdon, 1974-83
Ruislip, Northwood and Pinner	BC	next	*	1	GL
St George	BC	1885	1918	1	M1, L: Tower Hamlets, 1885–1918
St George Hanover Square	BC	1885	1918	1	M1, L: See Westminster St George's 1918-1950
St Marylebone	BC	1918	1983	1	L, GL: City of Wesrminster, 1974-1983
St Pancras East	BC	1885	1918	1	M1, L
St Pancras North	BC	1885	1983	1	M1, L, GL: Camden, 1974-1983
St Pancras South	BC	1885	1918	1	M1, L
St Pancras South East	BC	1918	1950	1	L
St Pancras South West	BC	1918	1950	1	L
St Pancras West	BC	1885	1918	1	M1, L
Shoreditch	BC	1918	1950	1	L
Shoreditch and Finsbury	BC	1950	1974	1	L, GL
Shoreditch Haggerston	BC	1885	1918	1	M1, L
Shoreditch Hoxton	BC	1885	1918	1	M1, L
Southall	BC	1945	1983	1	M2, GL: Ealing, 1974-1983
Southgate	BC	1950	1983	1	M2, GL: Enfield, 1974-1983
Spelthorne	CC (1918–1974)	1918	*	1	M2, S
Spelthorne	BC (1974-*)	1918	*	1	M2, S
Stepney	BC	1885	1918	1	M1, L, GL: Tower Hamlets, 1885–1918
Stepney	BC	1950	1974	1	M1, L, GL: Tower Hamlets, 1885–1918
Stepney and Poplar	BC	1974	1983	1	GL: Tower Hamlets, 1974-1983
Stoke Newington	BC	1918	1950	1	L
Strand	BC	1885	1918	1	M1, L
Tottenham	CC	1885	1918	1	M1, M2, GL: Haringey, 1974-1983
Tottenham	BC	1950	*	1	M1, M2, GL: Haringey, 1974-1983
Tottenham North	BC	1918	1950	1	M2
Tottenham South	BC	1918	1950	1	M2
Tower Hamlets	BC	1832	1885	2	M1
Twickenham	CC (1918–1945)	1918	*	1	M2, GL: Richmond upon Thames, 1974-1983
Twickenham	BC (1945-*)	1918	*	1	M2, GL: Richmond upon Thames, 1974-1983
Uxbridge	CC (1885–1974)	1885	next	1	M2, GL: Hillingdon, 1974-1983
Uxbridge	BC (1974-next)	1885	next	1	M2, GL: Hillingdon, 1974-1983
Uxbridge and South Ruislip	BC	next	*	1	GL
Wembley North	BC	1945	1974	1	M2, GL
Wembley South	BC	1945	1974	1	M2, GL
Westminster	BC	1545	1918	2 (1545-1885)	M1, L
Westminster	BC	1545	1918	1 (1885–1918)	M1, L
Westminster Abbey	BC	1918	1950	1	L
Westminster North	BC	1983	1997	1	GL
Westminster North	BC	next	*	1	GL
Westminster St George's	BC	1918	1950	1	L: See St George Hanover Square 1885-1918
Whitechapel	BC	1885	1918	1	M1, L: Tower Hamlets, 1885–1918
Whitechapel and St George's	BC	1918	1950	1	L: Stepney, 1918–1950
Willesden East	BC	1918	1974	1	M2, GL
Willesden West	BC	1918	1974	1	M2, GL
Wood Green	CC (1918–1950)	1918	1983	1	M2, GL: Haringey, 1974-1983
Wood Green	BC (1950–1983)	1918	1983	1	M2, GL: Haringey, 1974-1983

Notes:-

- ^{1} Not technically part of the administrative county of London, but it was surrounded by it and was not part of any other administrative county.
- ^{2} This constituency is strictly the South Poplar division of Poplar. As 'Poplar South Poplar' would include the borough name twice, the official name of the constituency is referred to as 'South Poplar'. The existing article calls the seat 'Poplar South' (which is in the usual form for a borough constituency, but does not match the unusual official name of the seat). A redirect exists from the official name to the article name.

=== Constituencies mostly in another historic county ===
Constituency	Type	From	To	MPs	Notes
Chipping Barnet	BC	1997 ^{1}	*	1	GL: Inc. Whetstone, Friern Barnet and parts of Cockfosters and Southgate from Mx
Hertsmere	CC	1983	*	1	H: Includes Potters Bar from Mx
South Hertfordshire	CC	1974	1983	1	H: Includes Potters Bar from Mx
Windsor	CC	1997	*	1	B: Includes Poyle from Mx

Note:-

- ^{1} The constituency is in Greater London and mostly forms part of the historic county of Hertfordshire. The seat was created in 1974, but it was not until the 1997 redistribution that it included part of the historic county of Middlesex.

== Summaries ==
=== Summary of constituencies by type and period ===
Type	1290	1298	1545	1832	1868	1885	1918	1945	1950	1955	1974	1983	1997	next
Borough	-	1	2	5	7	40	42	52	49	49	43	37	34	32
County	1	1	1	1	1	7	10	7	2	2	-	-	-	-
University	-	-	-	-	1	1	1	1	-	-	-	-	-	-
Total	1	2	3	6	9	48	53	60	51	51	43	37	34	32

=== Summary of members of parliament by type and period ===
Type	1290	1298	1545	1654	1658	1832	1868	1885	1918	1945	1950	1955	1974	1983	1997	next
Borough	-	4	6	8	6	12	16	41	43	53	49	49	43	37	34	32
County	2	2	2	4	2	2	2	7	10	7	2	2	-	-	-	-
University	-	-	-	-	-	-	1	1	1	1	-	-	-	-	-	-
Total	2	6	8	12	8	14	19	49	54	61	51	51	43	37	34	32

== Results ==
1885

1886

1892

1895

1900

1906

Jan 1910

Dec 1910

1918

1922

1923

1924

1929

1931

1935

1945

1950

1951

1955

1959

1964

1966

1970

== Historical representation by party ==
A cell marked → (with a different colour background to the preceding cell) indicates that the previous MP continued to sit under a new party name.

=== 1885 to 1918 ===
Conservative Liberal

Constituency	1885	1886	86	87	89	1892	1895	99	1900	1906	07	Jan 1910	Dec 1910	11	15	16
Brentford	Coope		Bigwood							Rutherford		Compton		Joynson-Hicks		
Ealing	Hamilton									Nield						
Enfield	Pleydell-Bouverie				Bowles					Branch		Newman				
Harrow	Ambrose							Cox		Gibb		Mallaby-Deeley				
Hornsey	McGarel-Hogg			Stephens					Balfour		Dundas					Jones
Tottenham	Howard									Alden						
Uxbridge	Dixon-Hartland											C. Mills			A. Mills	

=== 1918 to 1950 ===
Conservative Independent Labour Liberal National Labour

Constituency	1918	20	21	1922	23	1923	24	1924	1929	29	1931	32	34	1935	38	41	43	1945	45	48
Ealing / Ealing East (1945)	Nield										Sanderson									
Hornsey	Jones		Ward					Wallace								Gammans				
Twickenham	Joynson-Hicks									Ferguson		Murray-Philipson	Critchley	Keeling						
Wood Green	Locker-Lampson													Baxter						
Finchley	Newman					Robertson		Cadogan						Crowder						
Harrow / Harrow W (1945)	Mosley	→					→	Salmon								Bower				
Brentford and Chiswick	Morden										Mitchell							Noel-Baker		
Hendon / Hendon North (1945)	Cunliffe-Lister													Blair				Ayrton-Gould		
Spelthorne	Pilditch										Blaker							Pargiter		
Uxbridge	Peel			Burney					Llewellin									Beswick		
Willesden East	Mallaby-Deeley				Johnstone			Stanley	Somerville						Hammersley			Orbach		
Acton	Brittain								Shillaker		Duggan						Longhurst	Sparks		
Enfield	Bowles			Fermor-Hesketh		Henderson		Applin	Henderson		Applin			Bull				Davies		
Tottenham South	Malone					Alden		Malone	Messer		Palmer			Messer						
Willesden West	Pinkham			Furness		Viant					Tate			Viant						
Edmonton	Warren			Broad							Rutherford			Broad				Durbin		Albu
Tottenham North	Prescott			Morrison							Doran			Morrison					Irving	
Ealing West																		Hudson		
Harrow East																		Skinnard		
Hendon South																		Lucas-Tooth		
Heston and Isleworth																		Williams		
Southall																		Ayles		
Wembley North																		Hobson		
Wembley South																		Barton		

=== 1950 to 1974 ===
Conservative Independent Labour

Constituency	1950	51	1951	53	55	1955	57	58	59	1959	60	61	62	1964	1966	68	1970	70	71	72
Acton	Sparks									Holland				Floud		Baker	Spearing			
Brentford and Chiswick	Lucas									Smith					Barnes					
Ealing North	Hudson					Barter								Molloy						
Ealing South	Maude							Batsford												
Edmonton	Albu																			
Enfield East	Davies									Mackie										
Enfield West	Macleod																	Parkinson		
Feltham	N/A					Hunter									Kerr					
Finchley	Crowder									Thatcher										
Harrow Central	Bishop													Grant						
Harrow East	Harvey								Courtney						Roebuck		Dykes			
Harrow West	Bower	Braithwaite									Page									
Hayes and Harlington	Ayles			Skeffington															Sandelson	
Hendon North	Orr-Ewing																Gorst			
Hendon South	Lucas-Tooth																Thomas			
Heston and Isleworth	Harris																Hayhoe			
Hornsey	D. Gammans						M. Gammans								Rossi					
Ruislip Northwood	Crowder																			
Southall	Pargiter														Bidwell					
Southgate	Baxter													Berry						
Spelthorne	Craddock																	Atkins		
Tottenham	Messer									Brown		→	→	Atkinson						
Twickenham	Keeling				Cooke													Jessel		
Uxbridge	Beswick									Curran					Ryan		Curran			Shersby
Wembley North	Bullus																			
Wembley South	Russell																			
Willesden East	Orbach									Skeet				Freeson						
Willesden West	Viant									Pavitt										
Wood Green	Irving					Butler														

== See also ==
- Wikipedia:Index of article on UK Parliament constituencies in England
- Wikipedia:Index of articles on UK Parliament constituencies in England N-Z
- List of parliamentary constituencies in Islington
- List of parliamentary constituencies in London
- Parliamentary representation by historic counties
- First Protectorate Parliament
- Unreformed House of Commons
