= Janet McEwan =

Janet McEwan (1860 – 1921), née Janet Landells, known as Jenny McEwan, was a British Liberal Party politician and one of the first women to stand for election to the UK Parliament.

== Background ==
Janet Landells was born in Lanarkshire in 1860. She married fellow Scot, John McEwan of Enfield, Middlesex. They had five children including Ethel Tyndale, Bertha Alison Hollington and Elspeth Ian Sworder.

== Political career ==
Jenny McEwan had a long record of public work. She was Chairman of the Enfield Maternity Centre. Her husband John had been selected as prospective Liberal candidate for the Enfield division of Middlesex but died towards the end of the First World War. When women were granted the vote and allowed to stand for parliament, she was chosen as Liberal candidate in his place and contested the 1918 General Election. Enfield was a Unionist seat and her Unionist opponent had been endorsed by the Coalition Government. A Times correspondent reporting on her campaign stated "She desires the removal of restrictions on the opportunities for women; the opening of professions at present closed to them; and their admission to a share in the administration of justice." Even though she was also a supporter of the Coalition Government, the fact that a leading Liberal, Prime Minister David Lloyd George had endorsed her opponent, cost her much support and she came third;

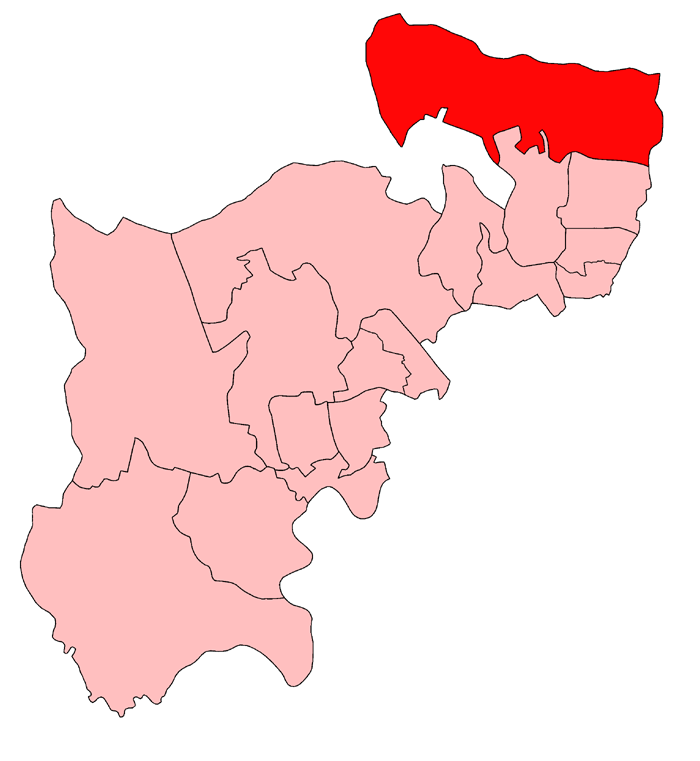
Enfield, boundaries used 1918

General Election 1918: Enfield
Party	Candidate	Votes	%	±%
Unionist	Col. Henry Ferryman Bowles	8,290	50.4	
Labour	William E. Hill	6,176	37.5	n/a
Liberal	Janet Landells McEwan	1,987	12.1	
Majority		2,114	12.9	
Turnout			54.8	
Unionist hold		Swing		

Janet McEwan died in Middlesex during 1921, at the age of 61.
