= Laurence George Bowman =

British politician (1866–1950)

Laurence George Bowman (16 March 1866 – 21 November 1950), was a British Liberal Party politician and headmaster.

== Background ==
He was born in Poland when it was part of Tsarist Russia, and brought to England in 1870. He was educated at the Jews Free School and University College, London where he obtained BA (Hons in Mental and Moral Science), MA (Philosophy, etc.) and BSc; Teachers’ Diploma (University of London). He married, in 1893, Fanny Cohen. She died in 1942. They had one son who was killed in 1917 and one daughter, Ruth.

== Educational career ==
He was Assistant Master at Jews Free School, 1880–98, Vice-Master, 1898–1907 and Headmaster, 1908–30 after which he retired. He was Chairman of the Education Committee of the Jewish Religious Education Board. Representative on the Appeal Tribunal of Unemployment Assistance Board. Vice-Chairman of Central School Employment Committee. He was a Member of various educational and political bodies. He was a Lecturer and Speaker on Educational and Political Subjects.

== Political career ==
He was a supporter of free trade, land value taxation, co-partnership in industry with profit sharing. He was a member of the Executive Committee of the London Liberal Federation. He was Liberal candidate for the St Pancras South East Division at the 1935 General Election. The constituency was not a good prospect for the Liberal Party as they came a poor third the last time they stood a candidate in 1929.

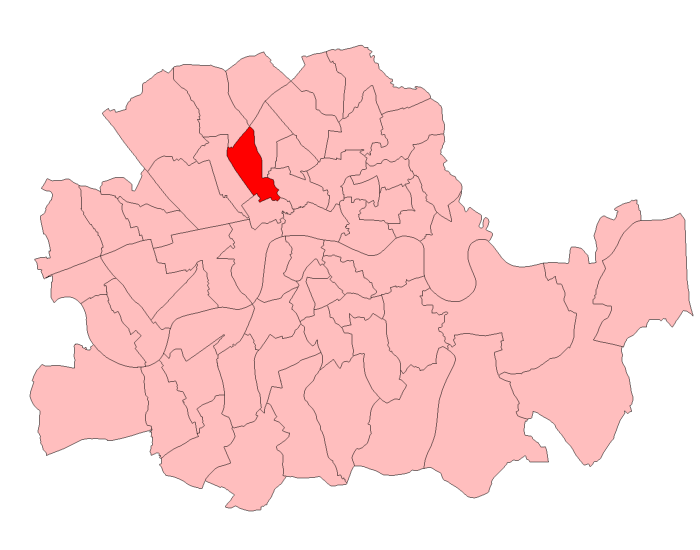
St Pancras South East in the County of London, showing boundaries used 1918-1950

General Election 14 November 1935: St Pancras South East
Party	Candidate	Votes	%	±%
Conservative	Sir Alfred Lane Beit	11,976	51.0	
Labour	Dr Santo Wayburn Jeger	10,340	44.0	
Liberal	Laurence George Bowman	1,181	5.0	
Majority		1,636	7.0	
Turnout		23,497	60.4	

He was re-adopted by local Liberal Association and continued as prospective parliamentary candidate until the outbreak of war By the time of the next General Election in 1945, he had been replaced as candidate and did not stand for parliament again. He was President of South Hendon Division Liberal Association.

== Ruth Abrahams ==
His daughter, born in 1894 as Ruth Bowman, in 1914 married Sidney Abrahams, who was later knighted. They had two children, Valerie and Anthony.

As Lady Abrahams, she was also politically active in the Liberal Party. She stood for parliament on three occasions; Orpington in 1950, Nottingham East in 1951 and Wembley North in 1955.
