= William Henderson, 1st Baron Henderson =

British Labour politician (1891–1984)

William Watson Henderson, 1st Baron Henderson PC (8 August 1891 – 4 April 1984), was a British Labour politician.

== Background ==
Henderson was the second son of Arthur Henderson and the elder brother of Arthur Henderson, Baron Rowley.

== Political career ==
He sat as Member of Parliament for Enfield from 1923 to 1924 and from 1929 to 1931 and served as Parliamentary Private Secretary to the Secretary of State for India William Wedgwood Benn from 1929 to 1931. He was also Head of the Press and Publicity Department of the Labour Party and served during the Second World War as Personal Assistant to the Minister without Portfolio Arthur Greenwood from 1940 to 1942. In 1945 he was raised to the peerage as Baron Henderson, of Westgate in the City and County of Newcastle upon Tyne. Henderson served in the Labour administration of Clement Attlee as a Lord-in-waiting (government whip in the House of Lords) and an additional member of the Air Council from 1945 to 1947 and as Joint Under-Secretary of State for Foreign Affairs from 1948 to 1951. In the 1950 Birthday Honours he was admitted to the Privy Council.

== Personal life ==
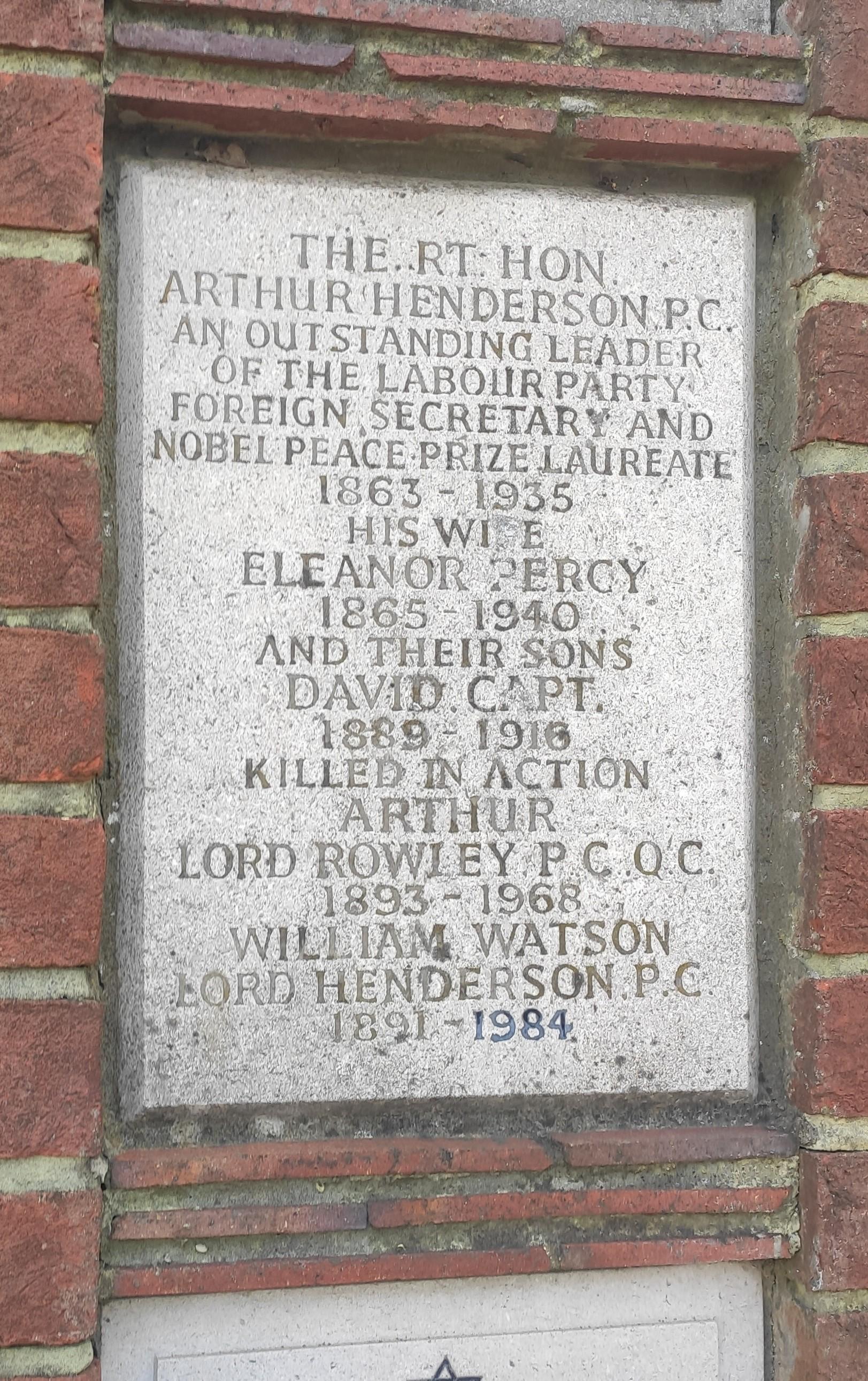
Plaque dedicated to Henderson, his parents and siblings at Golders Green Crematorium

Lord Henderson died in April 1984, aged 92. He never married and the title became extinct on his death. He was cremated at Golders Green Crematorium.

== Notes ==
Parliament of the United Kingdom
Preceded by Thomas Fermor-Hesketh	Member of Parliament for Enfield; 1923–1924	Succeeded by Reginald Applin
Preceded by Reginald Applin	Member of Parliament for Enfield; 1929–1931	Succeeded by Reginald Applin
Political offices
Preceded by Christopher Mayhew	Joint Under-Secretary of State for Foreign Affairs; 1948–1951; With: Christopher Mayhew 1948–1950; Ernest Davies 1950–1951	Succeeded by The Marquess of Reading; Anthony Nutting
Party political offices
Preceded by New position	Secretary of the Press and Publicity Department of the Labour Party; 1921–1945	Succeeded by Arthur Bax
Peerage of the United Kingdom
New creation	Baron Henderson; 1945–1984	Extinct
