= Young Gifted and Talented Programme =

United Kingdom government scheme

The Young, Gifted & Talented Programme (YG&T) was a United Kingdom government scheme that aimed to enhance the educational development of students between the ages of 4 and 19. The scheme was established in 2002, and scrapped in 2010 in favour of reallocating funds to help disadvantaged students get into University.

== Inclusion policy ==
Within the scheme, a young and gifted individual was defined as: "...children and young people with one or more abilities developed to a level significantly ahead of their year group (or with the potential to develop those abilities)”.

Entrance to the scheme was granted via a validation process performed by the student's school or college and was based on criteria including:

- For students aged between 4–11, there was no set percentage and they were identified by their performance and ability relative to their cohort.
- For students aged between 11–19, that they fell within the top 5% of students as identified by the national eligibility criteria provided by The Department for Children, Schools and Families (DCSF). Alternatively they could be selected by the use of local sectional that identified them as above average in their cohort within their school age group.

While the onus was on schools to determine the size of their gifted and talented population, clear justification for the size of the group and the benefit to all members must be clearly identified. The DCSF used 10% of any given school population as the assumption of size during the planning process.

== Operations ==
The operations of the programme were outsourced to the CfBT Education Trust who took over the National Programme for Gifted and Talented Education in September 2007 and renamed it to the Young, Gifted & Talented.

The program also supported the activities of private organisations in providing training activities and materials to the identified student groups.
