= Marian Hobson =

British scholar

Marian Hobson CBE FBA
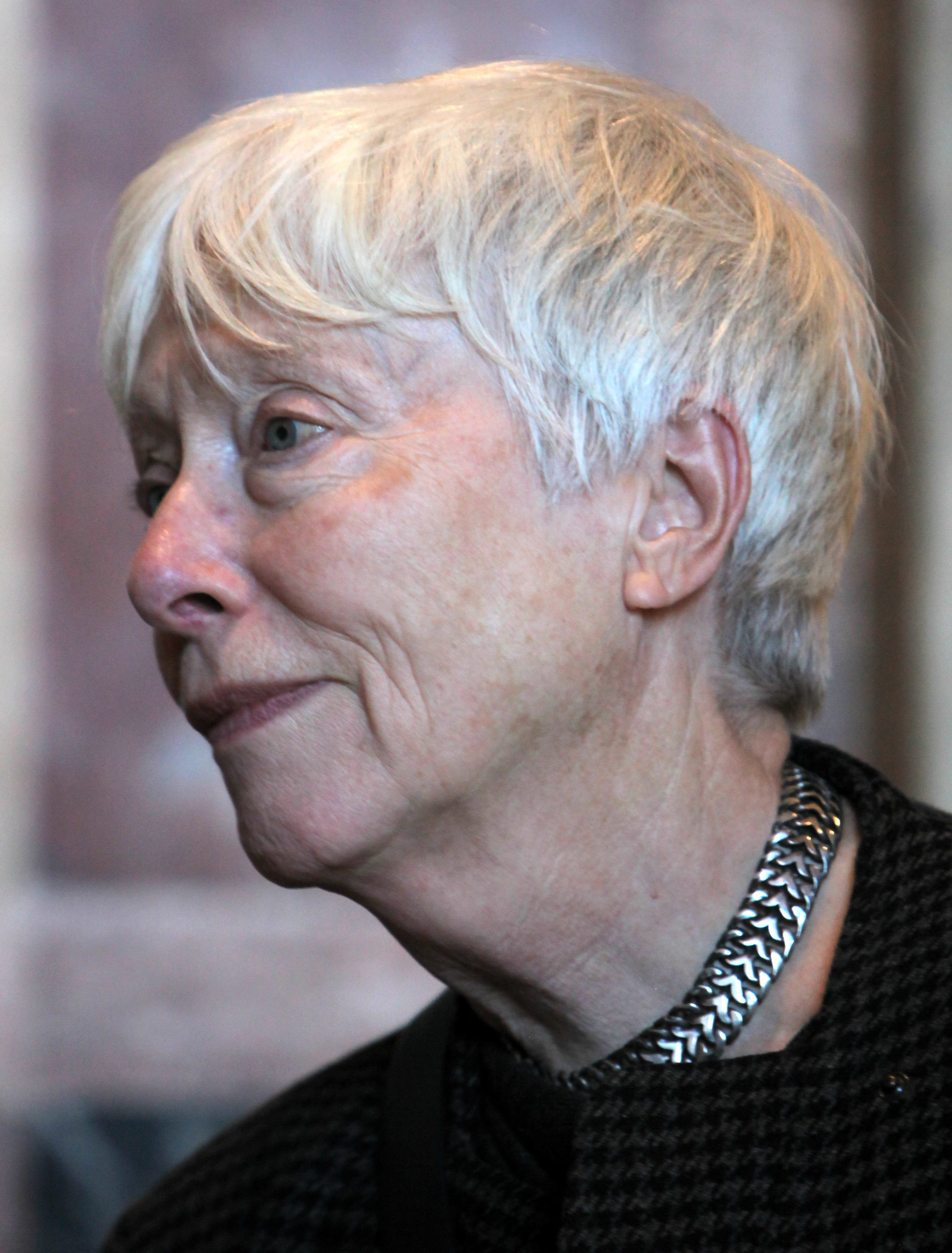
- Professor Hobson in 2016
- Born: Marian Elizabeth Hobson; 10 November 1941 (age 84)
- Other name: Marian Elizabeth Hobson Jeanneret
- Spouse: Michel Jeanneret (m. 1968)
- Children: One

Academic background
- Education: Newnham College, Cambridge
- Thesis: The concept of 'illusion' in French XVIIIth century aesthetic theory (1969)

Academic work
- Discipline: French studies
- Sub-discipline: French literature; French culture; Art history; French philosophy; Edmund Husserl; Denis Diderot; Jean-Jacques Rousseau; Jacques Derrida
- Institutions: University of Warwick; University of Geneva; University of Cambridge; Trinity College, Cambridge; Queen Mary, University of London

Marian Elizabeth Hobson Jeanneret, CBE, FBA (née Hobson; born 10 November 1941) is a British scholar of French philosophy, and culture. From 1992 to 2005, she was Professor of French at Queen Mary, University of London. She had previously taught at the University of Warwick, the University of Geneva, and the University of Cambridge. In 1977, she became the first woman to be elected a Fellow of Trinity College, Cambridge.

== Early life and education ==
Hobson was born on 10 November 1941 to Charles Hobson, a fitter at Neasden Power station till 1945. Then a Labour Party politician and Member of Parliament who was made a life peer in 1964 as Baron Hobson, and his wife Doris Mary Hobson (née Spink). She studied at Newnham College, Cambridge, graduating with Bachelor of Arts (BA) and Doctor of Philosophy (PhD) degrees: as per tradition, her BA was promoted to a Master of Arts (MA Cantab) degree. Her doctoral thesis, which she submitted in 1969, was titled "The concept of 'illusion' in French XVIIIth century aesthetic theory".

== Academic career ==
From 1966 to 1971, Hobson was an assistant lecturer in French at the University of Warwick. From 1973 or 1974 to 1976, she was a maître-assistante (assistant professor) at the University of Geneva. In 1977, she joined the University of Cambridge having been elected a Fellow of Trinity College, Cambridge: she was the first woman to become a Fellow of Trinity College. She was additionally a university lecturer between 1985 and 1992. Then, in 1992, she moved to Queen Mary, University of London (QMUL) having been appointed Professor of French. In 2005, she retired and was appointed Emerita Professor, although she continues some work at QMUL as a professorial research fellow.

Hobson has held a number of visiting professorships: University of California (1990), Johns Hopkins University (1995 and 2005), University of Paris (1997), and Harvard University (2007). She was the Norman Eugene Freehling Visiting Professor at the University of Michigan for the 2005/2006 academic year. From 2009 to 2012, she was a Member of the Council of the British Academy.

== Personal life ==
In 1966, Hobson made a brief tour of parts of Afghanistan (Badahkshan, Pactia) in the company of the author John Griffiths and the orientalist Jill Butterworth. In 1968, Hobson married Michel Jeanneret. Jeanneret is a Swiss scholar of French literature. Together they had one son.

== Honours ==
In 1997, Hobson was appointed a Chevalier of the Ordre des Palmes Académiques by the French Government. In 1999 Hobson was elected a Fellow of the British Academy (FBA), the United Kingdom's national academy for the humanities and social sciences. In the 2002 Queen's Birthday Honours, she was appointed a Commander of the Order of the British Empire (CBE) for services to French language and literature.

== Selected works ==
- Hobson, Marian (1982). The Object of Art: The Theory of Illusion in Eighteenth-Century France. Cambridge: Cambridge University Press. ISBN 978-0521243506.
- Diderot (2000). Marian Hobson; Simon Harvey (eds.). Lettre sur les aveugles à l'usage de ceux qui voient : lettre sur les sourds et muets à l'usage de ceux qui entendent et qui parlent (in French). Paris: Flammarion. ISBN 978-2080710819.
- Derrida, Jacques (2003). The problem of Genesis in Husserl's philosophy. Translated by Marian Hobson. Chicago: University of Chicago Press. ISBN 978-0226143156.
- Hobson, Marian (2011). Diderot and Rousseau: Networks of Enlightenment. Oxford: Voltaire Foundation. ISBN 978-0729410113.
- Marian, Hobson (2012). Jacques Derrida: Opening Lines. London: Routledge. ISBN 978-1134774449.
- Marian Hobson, ed. (2014). Denis Diderot 'Rameau's Nephew' - 'Le Neveu de Rameau': A Multi-Media Bilingual Edition (1st ed.). Cambridge: Open Book Publishers. ISBN 978-1783740086.
- Marian Hobson, ed. (2016). Denis Diderot 'Rameau's Nephew' - 'Le Neveu de Rameau': A Multi-Media Bilingual Edition (2nd ed.). Cambridge: Open Book Publishers. ISBN 978-1909254930.
