= Anthony Abrahams =

British educationalist

Anthony Claud Walter Abrahams (16 June 1923 – 22 April 2011) was a British Jewish barrister and educationalist who established CfBT Education Trust, one of the most important educational charities to be founded in post-World War II Britain. His work was fundamental to the creation of a professional structure for the teaching of English as a foreign language.

== Biography ==
The son of Sir Sidney Abrahams KC and Ruth Bowman, and nephew of Sir Adolphe Abrahams OBE FRCP and of the Olympic sprinter Harold Abrahams CBE, Tony Abrahams was born in Zanzibar on 16 June 1923 and educated at Bedford School. After serving in the SAS in North Africa, Italy and Greece during the Second World War, he read law at Emmanuel College, Cambridge. He was called to the bar by Middle Temple in 1951.

In 1954, Abrahams established the British Centre, an agency for teachers of English language working abroad, and then, in 1964, working with the Royal Society of Arts, he helped to devise and establish a certificate for teachers of English as a foreign language. In 1968, he established CfBT Education Trust to provide professional structure, practical support and general guidance for teachers of English language working overseas.

One of the top thirty charities by revenue registered in the United Kingdom, CfBT Education Trust has employed more than 10,000 teachers. It set up a distance-learning MA degree in linguistics and, working with the University of Birmingham, created a BPhil degree in teaching English as a foreign language.

Abrahams also helped to create Seaspeak, the international language of the sea. He was chairman of the Harpur Trust between 1978 and 1988. He made the decision to open a legal practice in Brunei at the age of 64, where he would represent murderers who were facing the death penalty. In 2000, he went back to Britain and continued to attend CfBT meetings, looking over the annual report for issues his barrister might ask.

Abrahams died on 22 April 2011, aged 87.
