= Bartle Bull =

American businessman and writer

Bartle Breese Bull or Bartle Bull III (born 1970) is an American businessman and writer. Bull is a former editor of the Middle East Monitor and foreign editor of Prospect, a leading London-based political and cultural magazine.

== Early life ==
Bull is the son of Bartle Bull and Belinda Lawrence Breese. His father is an author, former newspaper and magazine publisher, and lawyer who graduated from Harvard College, where he was an editor of The Harvard Crimson, Harvard University Law School and studied at Magdalen College, Oxford. His father was the New York City coordinator of N.Y. Citizens for Kennedy in 1968, organized New York State's Democrats for McCain in 2008, Democrats for Gibson in New York's 19th Congressional District in 2016, and served on the boards of the Fulbright Scholarship Program and the Initiative to Educate Afghan Women.

Bull is the grandson of Rosemary (née Baur) and Bartle Bull (1902–1950), a Canadian-born British barrister and Conservative Party politician. His mother was the daughter of William Lawrence Breese Jr. (1909–2000), founder and chairman of the Longview Foundation for Education in World Affairs and International Understanding, great-granddaughter of U.S. Representative Hamilton Fish II and the great-great granddaughter of Hamilton Fish (1808–1893), the United States Secretary of State from 1869 to 1877.

== Career ==
Bull has written from the Middle East for The New York Times, The Washington Post, The Wall Street Journal, the Financial Times, The Daily Telegraph, Foreign Policy, Die Welt and other publications. His work, widely syndicated in Europe and the United States, has been featured in Corriere della Sera, International Herald Tribune, Los Angeles Times and elsewhere. He has appeared many times on radio and television and is most frequently a guest on Fox Business News; he has also appeared on the BBC, NPR, Fox News and Al Jazeera.

Bull reported from Iraq following the start of the insurgency in the spring of 2004.

In the October 2007 issue of Prospect Magazine, Bull argued that the Coalition's mission in Iraq has been accomplished. With most Sunni factions now seeking a deal he claims the big questions in Iraq have been resolved positively. The country remains one, it has embraced the ballot box and avoided all-out civil war. He says that what violence remains is largely local and criminal. American troops will leave Iraq, Bull wrote, only "when the Iraqis, through their elected leadership, tell them to".

Bull is a founder of Northern Gulf Partners, an Iraq-focused investment firm. At Northern Gulf, Bull, "an emerging markets fund manager," helped to establish and operate Iraq Investment Partners I, the world's first Iraq-only public securities investment fund.

Bull's Showtime documentary feature film "Cradle of Champions" premiered at the Santa Barbara Film Festival in 2017 and won the critics' and audience awards at the Manchester (UK) International Film Festival. The film has been praised as "a new standard for character-driven narrative documentary... the envy of any feature filmmaker." Reviews have been positive: "the nail-biting excitement of a fictional boxing movie like RAGING BULL… both a stirring sports doc and a rich nonfiction drama, populated by characters who could have stepped out of a Damon Runyon story" … "real life with cinematic beauty" … "sensational" … "an astounding success" … "a great film… a film that I want to see again and again.... Bartle Bull hasn't just made a documentary, he has made a grand narrative that mirrors the mythic tales of antiquity" … "compelling" … "very, very powerful" … "robustly made… about New York and the way it sees itself: tough, big-hearted, assimilated and patriotic."

Bull is a former director of the Longview Foundation and sits on the Visiting Committee of the Department of Ancient Near Eastern Art at the Metropolitan Museum of Art in Manhattan. He holds an A.B. from Harvard University (1993) and an M.B.A. from Columbia University (2000).

Bull and his wife Claudia live in Dutchess County, NY with two young children.

== Bibliography ==
Fiction

- The White Rhino Hotel (1992)
- A Cafe on the Nile (1998)
- The Devil’s Oasis (2001)
- Shanghai Station (2004)
- China Star (2006)
- We’ll Meet Again (2022)

Non-fiction

- Around the Sacred Sea: Mongolia and Lake Bikal on Horseback (1999)
- Safari: a Chronicle of Adventure (1988)
- Land Between the Rivers: a 5,000 Year History of Iraq (2024)

== See also ==
- Prospect
