= Education Development Trust =

British not-for-profit organisation

Education Development Trust (formerly CfBT Education Trust) is a large not-for-profit organisation which provides education services in the United Kingdom (UK) and internationally. The charity is based in Reading, UK.

== History ==
Tony Abrahams founded the Centre for British Teachers in 1968 with the objective of helping British teachers working abroad. With activity centred in Germany, the organisation's vision was not only to recruit English teachers but also to offer them professional and welfare support within a structure that they would not otherwise have had. It was constituted as a registered charity in 1976. Throughout the 1990s, CfBT developed as a manager of aid-backed reform programmes in developing countries.

It subsequently expanded into offering a range of research, consultancy and support services to the education sector and operating as a contractor for a number of UK government education initiatives, such as the Young, Gifted and Talented Programme which it managed on behalf of the then Department for Children, Schools and Families.

The Centre for British Teachers, officially changed to CfBT Education Trust in 2006 and then became Education Development Trust in January 2016. Education Development Trust is governed by a board of trustees who direct the organisation's work. The trustees, chaired by Ilse Howling, oversee the Executive Team led by Interim CEO Sarah Farquhar.

Today Education Development Trust with a team of over 1,100, offers a broad range of education improvement services including research into good education practice in numerous countries worldwide, to education system improvement at scale, with specific expertise in system change, accountability, teacher development, leadership development and school to school collaboration.

Responsible for various government initiated teaching programmes including Accelerate, supporting early career teachers from more than 700 schools in England; Future Teaching Scholars and the Early Years Professional Development Programme, as well as their own collaborative Schools Partnership Programme which is engaged with 1,300 schools across England.

Education Development Trust deliver national careers advisory services for adults, as well as careers services for schools, and own and manage a private school in England: St Andrews School.

== Name change from CfBT Education Trust ==
With further international growth since 2006, and a strong focus on multiple aspects of school system reform, the organisation wanted to have a name that better reflected its mission.

For "legal reasons", there are some parts of the organisation who have not yet changed their name with the parent organisation.
