= Eric Bullus =

British politician

Sir Eric Bullus
- Bullus in 1950

Member of Parliament for Wembley North
- In office 1950 – February 1974
- Preceded by: Charles Hobson

Personal details
- Born: Eric Edward Bullus; 20 November 1906 Peterborough, England
- Died: 8 September 2001 (aged 94)
- Party: Conservative
- Spouse: Joan Denny (m. 1949; died 1993)
- Children: 2

Sir Eric Edward Bullus (20 November 1906 – 8 September 2001) was a British Conservative politician. He was a Member of Parliament (MP) for Wembley North from 1950 until the constituency was abolished by boundary changes for the February 1974 general election.

== Early life ==
Although Bullus was born in Peterborough, his mother's home town, he grew up in Leeds. He was educated at Leeds Modern School and the University of Leeds.

== Career ==
At the age of twenty, Bullus joined the right-of-centre newspaper the Yorkshire Post, for which he wrote for more than twenty years. He also joined the Junior Imperial League, the youth wing of the Conservative Party. He was elected to Leeds City Council in 1930. Five years later he became the Tory whip; he also held the chair of the Libraries and Arts Committee, founding a series of lunchtime concerts.

When the Second World War began, Bullus was thirty-three years old. Too old for active service, in August 1940 he was commissioned as a pilot officer in the Royal Air Force (RAF) Volunteer Reserve. He served at the Air Ministry until 1943, when he was promoted to the rank of flight lieutenant and transferred to southeast Asia to join Lord Mountbatten's staff. Despite eventually reaching the rank of wing commander, he never flew a plane, and was demobilised in December 1945.

=== Member of Parliament ===
Bullus was elected to the House of Commons in 1950 as MP for the constituency of Wembley North. He introduced the Criminal Justice (Amendment) Bill, which aimed to reinstate flogging as a punishment for violent and armed robbery (a punishment that had been abolished by the Criminal Justice Act 1948), as well as for wounding and rape, in 1952, and it was debated in early 1953. After the Home Secretary expressed opposition, the second reading of the bill was defeated in a free vote by a majority of 96. Bullus became the secretary of the Conservative backbenchers' 1922 Committee in 1953, and later served as Parliamentary Private Secretary to several ministers.

Bullus was a passionate eurosceptic. He strongly opposed Britain's entry into the European Communities and voted against party orders in favour of a referendum on the issue. However, his loyalty to the government led him to support the European Communities Act 1972 despite this.

Bullus was knighted in December 1964 as part of Alec Douglas-Home's dissolution honours list, for "political and public services".

== Personal life ==
Bullus was a member of the Church of England and a committed Christian. At home, he was a lay reader, preaching nearly one thousand sermons during his life, and while serving in Delhi during World War II he was a member of the arch-deaconry council. He also enjoyed sport, taking part in swimming, rugby and cricket, including playing for the Lords and Commons cricket team.

In 1949 he married Joan Denny, with whom he had two daughters. Joan died in 1993 after a marriage of fifty-two years. Bullus died in 2001, survived by both his children.

== Notes ==
Parliament of the United Kingdom
Preceded by Charles Hobson	Member of Parliament for Wembley North; 1950–Feb 1974	Succeeded by constituency abolished
