= Frederick Messer =

English Labour politician

Sir Frederick Messer CBE

Member of Parliament for Tottenham South
- In office 30 May 1929 – 27 October 1931
- Preceded by: Patrick Bernard Malone
- Succeeded by: Francis Noel Palmer
- In office 14 November 1935 – 23 February 1950
- Preceded by: Francis Noel Palmer
- Succeeded by: Constituency abolished

Member of Parliament for Tottenham
- In office 23 February 1950 – 8 October 1959
- Preceded by: Constituency established
- Succeeded by: Alan Grahame Brown

Chairman of Middlesex County Council
- In office 1947–1948
- Preceded by: Bernard Harry Rockman
- Succeeded by: William John Irving

Personal details
- Born: 12 May 1886 Islington, United Kingdom
- Died: 8 May 1971 (aged 84) Croydon, United Kingdom

Sir Frederick Messer CBE (12 May 1886 – 8 May 1971) was an English trade unionist, Labour Party politician and animal welfare activist. He was a member of the House of Commons and Chairman of Middlesex County Council.

== Life and Career ==
Messer was born in north London and was the son of a poor law officer. He was educated at Thornhill Primary School, Islington before entering an apprenticeship as a French polisher. He became one of the first members of the French Polishers Union. He subsequently changed his career, becoming national organiser of the Industrial Orthopaedic Society.

He was elected as a Labour Party Member of Parliament (MP) for Tottenham South at the 1929 general election. Two years later another election was held and Messer was defeated in a straight fight with the National Labour candidate, Francis Palmer The situation was reversed when he regained the seat from Palmer at the next general election in 1935. He held the seat until its abolition in 1950, and was MP for the successor seat of Tottenham from 1950 until his retirement from parliament in 1959. He was appointed a Commander of the Order of the British Empire in 1948 "for political and public services" and knighted in the 1953 Coronation Honours List.

As well as serving in parliament, he was for many years a member of Middlesex County Council. For 15 years he was chairman of the Labour group on the council, and in 1938 was elevated to become an alderman. He served as chairman of the council from 1947 to 1948, the first member of the Labour Party to hold the chair. A Bevanite, in 1958 he became the first president of Victory for Socialism, a left-wing ginger group within the Labour Party.

Messer died in Croydon, aged 84.

== Animal welfare ==
In 1954, Messer supported the Protection of Animals (Anaesthetics) Bill which had a second reading in the House of Commons. The Bill made it an offence to perform certain operations on cattle, cats, dogs and horses without the use of anaesthetics. The Bill had been prepared by the British Veterinary Association and received support from the National Farmers' Union, British Horse Society and the RSPCA.

In the late 1950s, Messer campaigned against deer hunting. He was a member of the National Abolition of Deer Hunting Committee. In 1957, he introduced to Parliament the Protection of Deer Bill. The Bill prohibited the hunting with hounds of deer and proposed humane methods of control. The Bill was drafted in consultation with the League Against Cruel Sports and also received support from the RSPCA.

In 1959, Messer performed the commentary on a 25 minute film of deer being hunted in Britain. The film took two years to produce and included footage of hunting scenes, including the chase, kill and cutting of dead deer. The film was made by the National Abolition of Deer Hunting Committee and was shown to MP's in the House of Commons.

In 1959 and 1965, the Protection of Deer Bill was read at the House of Commons with strong opposition.

Parliament of the United Kingdom
Preceded by Patrick Bernard Malone	Member of Parliament for Tottenham South; 1929 – 1931	Succeeded by Francis Noel Palmer
Preceded by Francis Noel Palmer	Member of Parliament for Tottenham South; 1935 – 1950	Constituency abolished
New constituency	Member of Parliament for Tottenham; 1950 – 1959	Succeeded by Alan Brown
