= James Branch =

James Branch

James Branch (27 February 1845 – 16 November 1918), was a British boot manufacturer and Liberal politician.

Branch was born in Bethnal Green in the East End of London, where he established a boot factory. An active member of the Liberal Party, he was president of the Bethnal Green Liberal Association for twenty years. In 1889 he was elected to the first London County Council as a member of the Liberal-backed Progressive Party representing Bethnal Green South West until 1907. He was a justice of the peace for the County of London, and well known for his philanthropic work in the East End and as a prominent member of the Congregational Church.

At the 1906 general election Branch successfully contested the parliamentary constituency of Enfield, one of many Liberals who unseated sitting Conservative MPs. He was defeated at the next election in January 1910, following a campaign where his Conservative opponents alleged that he was a Polish Jew and was using a false name. They also falsely claimed that he had discharged his British employees in favour of foreign workers. He attempted to regain the seat at the next election in December of the same year, but failed to be elected.

Parliament of the United Kingdom
Preceded by Henry Bowles	Member of Parliament for Enfield; 1906 – 1910	Succeeded by John Pretyman Newman
