= Charles Hobson, Baron Hobson =

British politician (1904–1966)

The Right Honourable The Lord Hobson
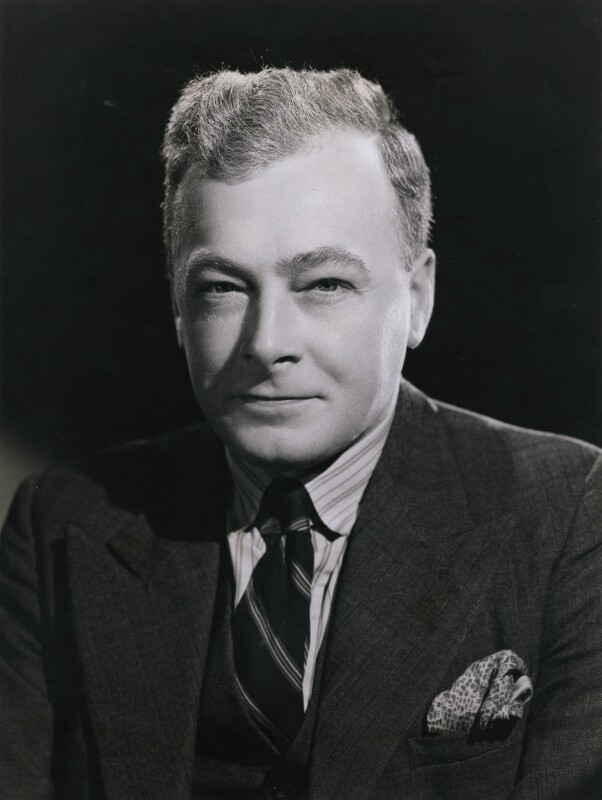
- Hobson in 1948

Member of Parliament for Keighley
- In office 23 February 1950 – 18 September 1959
- Preceded by: Ivor Thomas
- Succeeded by: Marcus Worsley

Member of Parliament for Wembley North
- In office 5 July 1945 – 3 February 1950
- Preceded by: Constituency created
- Succeeded by: Eric Edward Bullus

Personal details
- Born: Charles Rider Hobson; 18 February 1904
- Died: 17 February 1966 (aged 61)
- Party: Labour
- Spouse: Doris (m. 1933)
- Children: Marian Hobson

Charles Rider Hobson, Baron Hobson (18 February 1904 – 17 February 1966) was a British Labour politician and life peer.

== Political career ==
Hobson was Member of Parliament for Wembley North from 1945 to 1950 and for Keighley from 1950 to 1959. He was Assistant Postmaster-General in 1947.

On 20 January 1964, he was created a life peer as Baron Hobson, of Brent in the County of Middlesex. He served as a Lord-in-waiting (whip) in the House of Lords from 1964 to his death.

== Personal life ==
In 1933, Hobson married Doris Mary Spink, together they had one daughter, Marian Hobson. Marian would go on to be a scholar of French.

Parliament of the United Kingdom
New constituency	Member of Parliament for Wembley North; 1945–1950	Succeeded by Eric Bullus
Preceded by Ivor Thomas	Member of Parliament for Keighley; 1950–1959	Succeeded by Marcus Worsley
Political offices
Preceded by New government	Lord-in-waiting; 1964–1966	Succeeded by The Lord Hilton of Upton
