= Harrow Central (constituency) =

Parliamentary constituency in the United Kingdom, 1950–1983

Coordinates: 51.58°N 0.34°W

- Former borough constituency for the House of Commons

1950–1983
- Seats: One
- Created from: Harrow East and Harrow West
- Replaced by: Harrow East and Harrow West

Map that gives each named seat and any constant electoral success for national (Westminster) elections for Middlesex, 1955 to 1974.

Harrow Central was a parliamentary constituency in Harrow, London, which returned one Member of Parliament (MP) to the House of Commons of the Parliament of the United Kingdom from 1950 until it was abolished for the 1983 general election.

== Boundaries ==
1950–1955: The Urban District of Harrow wards of Harrow-on-the-Hill and Greenhill, Headstone, Wealdstone North, Wealdstone South, and West Harrow.

1955–1974: The Municipal Borough of Harrow wards of Harrow-on-the-Hill and Greenhill, Kenton, Wealdstone North, Wealdstone South, and West Harrow.

1974–1983: The London Borough of Harrow wards of Harrow-on-the-Hill and Greenhill, Kenton, Wealdstone North, Wealdstone South, and West Harrow.

== Members of Parliament ==
Election	Member	Party
1950	Sir Patrick Bishop	Conservative
1964	Anthony Grant	Conservative
1983	constituency abolished	

== Elections ==
=== Elections in the 1950s ===
General election 1950: Harrow Central
Party	Candidate	Votes	%	±%
Conservative	Patrick Bishop	22,907	51.94	
Labour	D Robert Rees	16,371	37.12	
Liberal	Norman William Murrell	4,827	10.94	
Majority		6,536	14.82	
Turnout		44,105	86.84	
Conservative win (new seat)				

General election 1951: Harrow Central
Party	Candidate	Votes	%	±%
Conservative	Patrick Bishop	25,564	59.31	
Labour	B Joan K Thompson	17,540	40.69	
Majority		8,024	18.62	
Turnout		43,104	85.04	
Conservative hold		Swing		

General election 1955: Harrow Central
Party	Candidate	Votes	%	±%
Conservative	Patrick Bishop	23,996	60.06	
Labour	Fred Powe	15,955	39.94	
Majority		8,041	20.12	
Turnout		39,951	79.36	
Conservative hold		Swing		

General election 1959: Harrow Central
Party	Candidate	Votes	%	±%
Conservative	Patrick Bishop	23,813	62.89	
Labour	Fred Powe	14,049	37.11	
Majority		9,764	25.78	
Turnout		37,862	79.52	
Conservative hold		Swing		

=== Elections in the 1960s ===
General election 1964: Harrow Central
Party	Candidate	Votes	%	±%
Conservative	Anthony Grant	16,534	46.22	
Labour	Ronald Victor Spurway	12,067	33.74	
Liberal	Dennis Frederick Joyner	7,168	20.04	New
Majority		4,467	12.48	
Turnout		35,769	78.59	
Conservative hold		Swing		

General election 1966: Harrow Central
Party	Candidate	Votes	%	±%
Conservative	Anthony Grant	15,971	45.08	
Labour	Anthony R Judge	14,341	40.48	
Liberal	Anthony HJ Miller	5,118	14.45	
Majority		1,630	4.60	
Turnout		35,430	80.17	
Conservative hold		Swing		

=== Elections in the 1970s ===
General election 1970: Harrow Central
Party	Candidate	Votes	%	±%
Conservative	Anthony Grant	16,525	50.2	+5.1
Labour	Anthony R Judge	12,561	38.2	−2.3
Liberal	Anthony HJ Miller	3,449	10.5	−3.9
Independent	Sydney Carter	358	1.1	New
Majority		3,964	12.0	+7.4
Turnout		32,893	71.6	−8.6
Conservative hold		Swing		

General election February 1974: Harrow Central
Party	Candidate	Votes	%	±%
Conservative	Anthony Grant	15,320	42.34	
Labour	David M Offenbach	12,403	34.28	
Liberal	Ronald Montgomerie	7,635	21.10	
National Front	J Donin	823	2.27	New
Majority		2,917	8.06	
Turnout		36,181	80.56	
Conservative hold		Swing		

General election October 1974: Harrow Central
Party	Candidate	Votes	%	±%
Conservative	Anthony Grant	14,356	43.47	
Labour	David M Offenbach	12,288	37.21	
Liberal	Ronald Montgomerie	5,566	16.85	
National Front	C Bryne	813	2.46	
Majority		2,068	6.26	
Turnout		33,023	72.96	
Conservative hold		Swing		

General election 1979: Harrow Central
Party	Candidate	Votes	%	±%
Conservative	Anthony Grant	16,627	48.96	
Labour	Andrew Quicke	12,124	35.70	
Liberal	Ralph Bancroft	4,785	14.09	
National Front	Harold Marshall	427	1.26	
Majority		4,503	13.26	
Turnout		33,963	75.10	
Conservative hold		Swing		
