= Ronald Russell (British politician) =

Sir Ronald Stanley Russell FRSA (29 May 1904 – 6 April 1974) was a British journalist, author and Conservative politician.

== Early life ==
Russell was born on 29 May 1904, the son of J Stanley Russell of Seahouses, Northumberland. He was educated at Haileybury and Imperial Service College and Gonville and Caius College, Cambridge. He began a career in journalism in 1929 at the Newcastle Chronicle, moving to Reuters in 1931.

In 1935, he became a lecturer on the economics of the coal industry. During the Second World War he served as an officer in the Royal Artillery and as a staff officer.

== Parliamentary career ==
At the 1935 general election he unsuccessfully contested the Glasgow constituency of Shettleston. At the 1945 general election Russell stood for parliament at Coatbridge, again without success. In the following year he was elected to the London County Council to represent Norwood.

He became a Member of Parliament on his third attempt in 1950, winning the seat of Wembley South. He held the seat until the constituency was abolished by boundary changes at the February 1974 general election. He acted as Private Parliamentary Secretary to Duncan Sandys, Minister of Supply, from 1951 to 1955.

The honorary secretary of the Animal Welfare Group, he piloted the Pet Animals Act 1951 through parliament. He also put pressure on the Board of Trade to ban the importation of tortoises as pets and promoted a private members bill to stop live cattle, sheep and pigs being exported for slaughter.

Russell died, aged 69, less than two months after the election.

== Personal life ==
In 1933, Russell married Ena Glendenning Forrester of Middlesbrough, and they had two children, Ronald Charles and Jillian Margaret.

== Honours ==
Russell was a Fellow of the Royal Society of Arts. As part of the 1964 New Year Honours, he was knighted "for political and public services".

Parliament of the United Kingdom
Preceded by Clarence Barton	Member of Parliament for Wembley South; 1950 – Feb 1974	Succeeded by Constituency abolished
