= John Mackie, Baron John-Mackie =

British Labour MP

John Mackie, Baron John-Mackie (24 November 1909 – 25 May 1994) was a British Labour MP.

Born on a farm in Scotland, Mackie was educated at Aberdeen Grammar School and the North Scotland College of Agriculture before himself becoming a farmer. He joined the Labour Party, and stood unsuccessfully in North Angus and Mearns at the 1951 United Kingdom general election, and Lanark at the 1955 United Kingdom general election. He finally won election in Enfield East at the 1959 United Kingdom general election.

Mackie was Parliamentary Secretary to the Ministry of Agriculture, Fisheries and Food in the Labour Government 1964-1970. He stood down in 1974, and in 1976 he was appointed as chair of the Forestry Commission. On 18 May 1981, he was created a life peer with the title Baron John-Mackie, of Nazeing in the County of Essex.

His younger brothers were Sir Maitland Mackie and the Liberal MP George Mackie, Baron Mackie of Benshie. His son, George Mackie, was a Scotland international rugby union player.

Parliament of the United Kingdom
Preceded by Ernest Albert John Davies	Member of Parliament for Enfield East; 1959–Feb. 1974	Constituency abolished
