= Bartle Bull (politician) =

Canadian-born British barrister and Conservative Party politician (1902-1950)

- Bull in 1940

Member of Parliament for Enfield
- In office 1935–1945
- Preceded by: Reginald Applin
- Succeeded by: Ernest Davies

Personal details
- Born: 1 April 1902 Rosedale, Toronto, Canada
- Died: 17 October 1950 (aged 48) Chesham Place, London, United Kingdom
- Party: Conservative
- Spouse: Rosemary Baur (m. 1931)
- Relations: Bartle Bull (grandson)
- Parent(s): William Perkins Bull; Maria Scott Brennen
- Education: Eton College; Magdalen College, Oxford

Military service
- Allegiance: United Kingdom
- Branch/service: Coldstream Guards
- Battles/wars: Second World War: • North African Campaign • Battle of Sidi Barrani

Bartle Brennen Bull (1 April 1902 – 17 October 1950) was a Canadian-born British barrister and Conservative Party politician.

== Early life ==
He was the eldest son of Maria Scott Brennen (1875–1934) and William Perkins Bull (1870–1948) KC of Eaton Place in London and Lorne Hall in Rosedale, Toronto, Canada. Bull was president of the Okanagan Lumber Company, the founder and director of the Canadian Oil Company, president of the Sterling Oil Company, the founder of Red Deer Investments, and founder, director and treasurer of the Mississauga Lumber Company.

Born in Toronto, he was educated in England at Eton College and Magdalen College, Oxford. He subsequently studied law, passing bar examinations in criminal law and procedure in 1925 and property and conveyancing in 1926.

Bull won Eton's long-distance swimming championship, in 1920.

== Career ==
He was called to the bar at the Inner Temple in 1928. In the same year he moved to Bartle, Cuba, to manage his family's cattle ranch and sugar plantation. On return to England he began to practice law on the South Eastern Circuit. In early 1931, Bull "suffered an attack of poisoning" while in Cuba.

In February 1935, Bull was chosen by the Enfield District Conservative Association to contest the local constituency at the next general election, in place of the retiring Member of Parliament, Lieutenant-Colonel R V K Applin. He retained the seat for the Conservatives at the general election held in October 1935.

With the outbreak of the Second World War, Bull obtained a commission in the Coldstream Guards. He took part in the North African Campaign, and was badly wounded at the Battle of Sidi Barrani.

Bull lost his Commons seat at the 1945 general election, when it was one of many won by the Labour Party in a political landslide. On leaving parliament, Bull returned to his legal practice.

== Personal life ==
In 1931, Bull was married to Rosemary Baur (1911–2006), an American who was a graduate of Bryn Mawr College dubbed "Chicago's richest debutante." She was the daughter of Jacob Baur, the father of the Soda fountain and inherited $2.5-$3 million from a trust established by her father. Rumours of his engagement were mentioned in the press in February 1931, but confirmed in May. Newspapers reported that Bull had visited Baur at Cap D'Antibes in 1930.

Together, they were the parents of two children:

- Romia Bull,
- Bartle Bull, a Harvard lawyer who was the New York City coordinator of N.Y. Citizens for Kennedy in 1968. In 1968, he married Belinda Lawrence Breese, the daughter of William Lawrence Breese Jr. (1909–2000), founder and chairman of the Longview Foundation for Education in World Affairs and International Understanding, great-granddaughter of U.S. Representative Hamilton Fish II and the great-great-granddaughter of Hamilton Fish (1808–1893), the United States Secretary of State from 1869 to 1877.

He died from a heart attack at his home in Chesham Place, London, in October 1950, aged 48.

=== Descendants ===
Through his son Bartle, he was the grandfather of Bartle Bull III (b. 1970), the American writer who is the editor of the Middle East Monitor and foreign editor of Prospect, a leading British political and cultural magazine, as well as Romia Bull, a Brearley School and Bryn Mawr College graduate, who married Geoffrey Dodge Kimball, a deputy manager in the investment advisory department of Brown Brothers Harriman & Company in New York, in 1984.

Parliament of the United Kingdom
Preceded by Reginald Applin	Member of Parliament for Enfield; 1935 – 1945	Succeeded by Ernest Davies
