= Anthony Grant (politician) =

British politician

Sir Anthony Grant

Member of Parliament for South West Cambridgeshire
- In office 9 June 1983 – 8 April 1997

Member of Parliament for Harrow Central
- In office 15 October 1964 – 13 May 1983
- Preceded by: Patrick Bishop

Personal details
- Born: John Anthony Grant; 29 May 1925
- Died: 9 October 2016 (aged 91)
- Party: Conservative
- Children: 2
- Education: St Paul's School, London; Brasenose College, Oxford

Military service
- Allegiance: United Kingdom
- Branch/service: British Army
- Years of service: 1943–1948
- Rank: Captain
- Unit: 3rd Carabiniers

Sir John Anthony Grant (29 May 1925 – 9 October 2016) was a British Conservative politician who served as a Member of Parliament (MP) from 1964 until his retirement in 1997. He was knighted for political and public service in the 1983 New Year Honours.

== Early life ==
He attended St Paul's School, London, and Brasenose College, Oxford. He served in the Army from 1943–1948 as a captain in the Third Dragoon Guards (3rd Carabiniers) and became a solicitor in 1952.

== Parliamentary career ==
Grant first contested Hayes and Harlington, unsuccessfully, in 1959. He was Member of Parliament (MP) for Harrow Central from 1964 to 1983. The Harrow Central constituency was abolished during boundary changes just before the 1983 general election. During this procedure, he competed unsuccessfully with Hugh Dykes, the sitting MP for Harrow East, for the nomination for the much enlarged Harrow East constituency. He then sat for Cambridgeshire South West from 1983 until he retired in 1997.

He served as Parliamentary Secretary to the Board of Trade and Parliamentary Under-Secretary at the Department of Trade and Industry in the Heath government of 1970 to 1974, and was a strong supporter of small businesses. From 1974 to 1976 he served as a vice-chairman of the Conservative Party. He did not serve in Margaret Thatcher's administrations, but won the admiration of 'wet' Tory colleagues. In the view of Alan Clark, he “always hated her and the values she stood for”. In his own words, Anthony Grant said he admired Thatcher but "did not hit it off with her enormously". He served on Select Committees and sponsored the Lloyd's Act 1982

He spoke little in the House of Commons, but would on occasion ensure that any credit for Addenbrooke's Hospital went to his constituency and not to Cambridge.

On 16 November 1990, during a road safety debate in the House of Commons, Grant suggested that the 377-bhp Lotus Carlton with a top speed of over 170 mph, which could be bought for just £45,000 (way cheaper than a Porsche or a Ferrari) should not be allowed on the British roads, saying "These cars require the skill of Nigel Mansell to operate them safely."

== Personal life ==
He married Sonia Isobel Landen, daughter of George and Winifred Landen, in 1954 and they had a son and daughter. He twice served as Master of the Guild of Freemen of the City of London, in 1979/80 and 1997/98. He died on 9 October 2016 at the age of 91.

== Notes ==
Parliament of the United Kingdom
Preceded by Patrick Bishop	Member of Parliament for Harrow Central; 1964–1983	Constituency abolished
New constituency	Member of Parliament for South West Cambridgeshire; 1983–1997	Constituency abolished
