= John Pretyman Newman =

Irish-born British Army officer, later politician

Lieutenant-Colonel Sir John Robert Pretyman Newman (born John Robert Bramston Newman; 22 August 1871 – 12 March 1947) was an Irish-born British Army officer and Conservative politician.

He was the eldest son of John Adam Richard Newman of Newberry Manor, Mallow, County Cork and his wife Matilda née Bramston of Llangefni, Anglesey.

== Early life ==
Following education at Charterhouse School and Trinity College, Cambridge, Newman received a commission in the 5th Battalion, Royal Munster Fusiliers. He was appointed a deputy lieutenant and justice of the peace for County Cork. In 1898 he served as the county's high sheriff.

== Marriages ==
Newman was married twice. In 1895 he married the Hon. Olivia Anne Plunket, daughter of the 4th Baron Plunkett, who died in 1896. In 1898 he wed Geraldine "Ina" Olivia Pretyman, daughter of Colonel William Pretyman of the King's Royal Rifle Corps, and he assumed the additional surname of Pretyman in place of Bramston. The couple made their home at 79 Eaton Square in the Belgravia district of London. His second wife died in October 1935.

== Political career ==
=== Member of parliament for Enfield ===
In 1906 he unsuccessfully contested the parliamentary constituency of Walthamstow as a Conservative candidate. At the next general election in January 1910 he stood at Enfield, Middlesex. The seat was considered to be a safe Liberal constituency, but Newman managed to unseat the sitting member of parliament, James Branch by 1,242 votes. A further general election was held in December of the same year, and Newman held the seat with a reduced majority of 936 votes. During the First World War Newman served with the Middlesex Regiment on the Western Front, reaching the rank of major.

=== Member of parliament for Finchley ===
Due to the First World War no further election was held until 1918. The Representation of the People Act 1918 redrew constituencies throughout Great Britain, and Newman was elected as first member of parliament for the new Finchley constituency, which included part of the existing Enfield seat. He held the seat at the 1922 election, but was defeated by his Liberal opponent, T A Robertson, when a further election was called in 1923. He was knighted in February 1924 as part of the resignation hours of Stanley Baldwin.

=== Middle Class Union ===
Newman was on the right wing of Conservative politics. He expressed admiration for fascism in his role as vice-president of the Middle Class Union formed in 1919 as an Anti-Socialist group to maintain public services in the event of strike action.

== Later life ==
Newman was the director of a number of companies including Allied Cement and Stream-Line Filters. In 1928, while chairman of Perfecta Meters Limited, he wrote a letter to a shareholder of the company making allegations against the managing director of the company. Newman was found guilty of libel, and damages of 1,500 pounds were awarded against him.

Newman died on 12 March 1947 in Farnham, Surrey, and was cremated in Woking two days later.

Parliament of the United Kingdom
Preceded by James Branch	Member of Parliament for Enfield; January 1910 – 1918	Succeeded by Henry Bowles
New constituency	Member of Parliament for Finchley; 1918 – 1923	Succeeded by T. Atholl Robertson
