= Enfield (constituency) =

Parliamentary constituency in the United Kingdom, 1885–1950

- Former borough constituency for the House of Commons
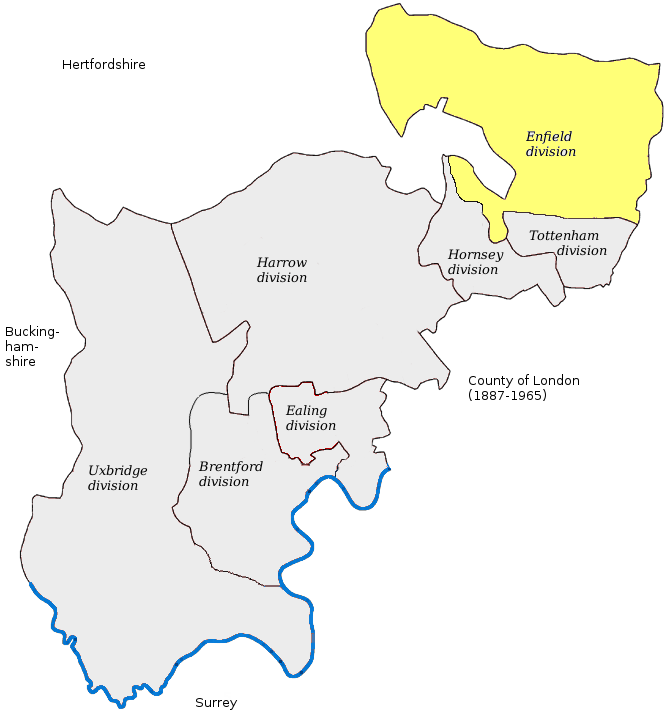
- Enfield 1885–1918

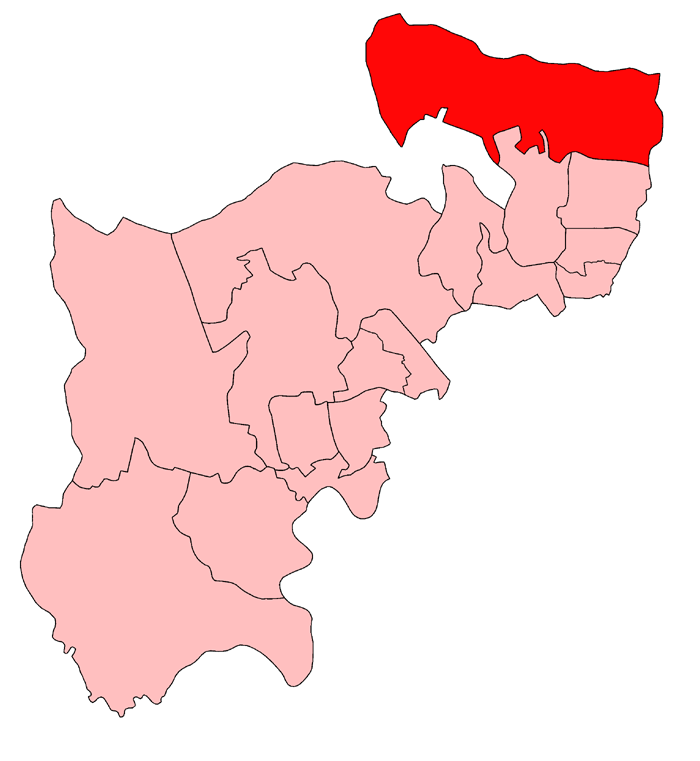
- Enfield 1918–45

1885–1950
- Seats: one
- Created from: Middlesex
- Replaced by: Edmonton (south east of seat in 1918); Finchley (as to Friern Barnet in 1918); Wood Green (as to Southgate, south part of Enfield); Enfield East and Enfield West (in 1950)

Enfield was a constituency for the House of Commons of the UK Parliament from 1885 until 1950. The area sloping to the River Lea in the east was in the far north of Middlesex centred on the town of Enfield. The area formed part of the London conurbation and was much reduced over the course of its existence, in 1918 and then insignificantly in 1945 due to suburbanisation and urbanisation. It returned one Member of Parliament (MP).

== History ==
The constituency was created by the Redistribution of Seats Act 1885 for the 1885 general election, and abolished for the 1950 general election. It was then replaced by the new Enfield East and Enfield West constituencies.

== Boundaries ==
1885–1918: The parishes of Edmonton, Enfield, Friern Barnet, Monken Hadley, and South Mimms. These reflected ancient parishes and the smallest in the non-metropolitan county, Monken Hadley was a small rectangle in the south-centre of the seat. Friern Barnet formed a projection in the south-west running north-west reflecting the eccentric shape of this part of the county border. The latter adjoined Barnet in Hertfordshire as much of the rest did and joined the parishes of Hornsey and Finchley to the south.

1918–1950: The Urban District of Enfield, and the Rural District of South Mimms. The Representation of the People Act 1918 redrew constituencies throughout Great Britain and Ireland, and defined them in terms of the new urban and rural districts introduced by the Local Government Act 1894. Of the areas transferred to other constituencies in this redistribution, Edmonton became a separate constituency, while Friern Barnet was transferred to the new Finchley seat. A "Wood Green" seat was devised which took the Southgate southern parts of Enfield and western extreme of Edmonton parish.

^ Note a: Renamed as Potters Bar Urban District in 1934.

== Members of Parliament ==
Election	Member	Party
1885	William Pleydell-Bouverie	Conservative
1889 by-election	Henry Bowles	Conservative
1906	James Branch	Liberal
1910	John Pretyman Newman	Conservative
1918	Henry Bowles	Conservative
1922	Thomas Fermor-Hesketh	Conservative
1923	William Henderson	Labour
1924	Reginald Applin	Conservative
1929	William Henderson	Labour
1931	Reginald Applin	Conservative
1935	Bartle Bull	Conservative
1945	Ernest Davies	Labour
1950	constituency abolished: see Enfield East and Enfield West	

== Elections ==
=== Elections in the 1880s ===
General election 1885: Enfield
Party	Candidate	Votes	%	±%
Conservative	William Pleydell-Bouverie	3,644	57.6	
Liberal	John Kempster	2,684	42.4	
Majority		960	15.2	
Turnout		6,328	73.4	
Registered electors		8,621		
Conservative win (new seat)				

General election 1886: Enfield
Party	Candidate	Votes	%	±%
Conservative	William Pleydell-Bouverie	3,287	75.5	+17.9
Liberal	John Treeve Edgcombe	1,067	24.5	−17.9
Majority		2,220	51.0	+35.8
Turnout		4,354	50.5	−22.9
Registered electors		8,621		
Conservative hold		Swing	+17.9	

Pleydell-Bouverie was appointed Treasurer of the Household, requiring a by-election.

By-election, 12 Aug 1886: Enfield
Party	Candidate	Votes	%	±%
Conservative	William Pleydell-Bouverie	Unopposed		
Conservative hold				

Pleydell-Bouverie was elevated to the peerage, becoming Earl of Radnor, causing a by-election.

Henry Bowles

By-election, 30 Mar 1889: Enfield
Party	Candidate	Votes	%	±%
Conservative	Henry Bowles	5,124	58.7	−16.8
Liberal	William Henry Fairbairns	3,612	41.3	+16.8
Majority		1,512	17.4	−33.6
Turnout		6,636	79.5	+29.0
Registered electors		10,993		
Conservative hold		Swing	−16.8	

=== Elections in the 1890s ===
General election 1892: Enfield
Party	Candidate	Votes	%	±%
Conservative	Henry Bowles	5,491	60.0	−15.5
Liberal	Albert Stephen Hatchett-Jones	3,660	40.0	+15.5
Majority		1,831	20.0	−31.0
Turnout		9,151	72.2	+21.7
Registered electors		12,674		
Conservative hold		Swing	−15.5	

General election 1895: Enfield
Party	Candidate	Votes	%	±%
Conservative	Henry Bowles	Unopposed		
Conservative hold				

=== Elections in the 1900s ===
General election 1900: Enfield
Party	Candidate	Votes	%	±%
Conservative	Henry Bowles	6,923	65.5	N/A
Liberal	Charles Stewart Crole	3,655	34.5	New
Majority		3,268	31.0	N/A
Turnout		10,578	62.1	N/A
Registered electors		17,044		
Conservative hold		Swing	N/A	

James Branch

General election 1906: Enfield
Party	Candidate	Votes	%	±%
Liberal	James Branch	9,790	56.1	+21.6
Conservative	Henry Bowles	7,674	43.9	−21.6
Majority		2,116	12.2	N/A
Turnout		17,464	74.7	+12.6
Registered electors		23,386		
Liberal gain from Conservative		Swing	+21.6	

=== Elections in the 1910s ===
General election January 1910: Enfield
Party	Candidate	Votes	%	±%
Conservative	John Pretyman Newman	12,625	52.6	+8.7
Liberal	James Branch	11,383	47.4	−8.7
Majority		1,242	5.2	N/A
Turnout		24,008	84.0	+9.3
Registered electors		28,571		
Conservative gain from Liberal		Swing	+8.7	

General election December 1910: Enfield
Party	Candidate	Votes	%	±%
Conservative	John Pretyman Newman	11,495	52.1	−0.5
Liberal	James Branch	10,559	47.9	+0.5
Majority		936	4.2	−1.0
Turnout		22,054	77.2	−6.8
Registered electors		28,571		
Conservative hold		Swing	−0.5	

General Election 1914–15:

Another General Election was required to take place before the end of 1915. The political parties had been making preparations for an election to take place and by July 1914, the following candidates had been selected;

- Unionist: John Pretyman Newman
- Liberal: John McEwan

General election 1918: Enfield
Party		Candidate	Votes	%	±%
C	Unionist	Henry Bowles	8,290	50.4	−1.7
	Labour	William E. Hill	6,176	37.5	New
	Liberal	Janet McEwan	1,987	12.1	−35.8
Majority			2,114	12.9	+8.7
Turnout			16,453	54.8	−22.4
Registered electors			30,031		
	Unionist hold		Swing	+17.1	
C indicates candidate endorsed by the coalition government.

=== Elections in the 1920s ===
General election 1922: Enfield
Party	Candidate	Votes	%	±%
Unionist	Thomas Fermor-Hesketh	11,725	54.4	+4.0
Labour	George Lathan	9,820	45.6	+8.1
Majority		1,905	8.8	−4.1
Turnout		21,545	71.8	+17.0
Registered electors		29,992		
Unionist hold		Swing	−2.1	

General election 1923: Enfield
Party	Candidate	Votes	%	±%
Labour	William Henderson	11,050	52.8	+7.2
Unionist	Thomas Fermor-Hesketh	9,888	47.2	−7.2
Majority		1,162	5.6	N/A
Turnout		20,938	68.5	−3.3
Registered electors		30,580		
Labour gain from Unionist		Swing	+7.2	

General election 1924: Enfield
Party	Candidate	Votes	%	±%
Unionist	Reginald Applin	13,886	54.0	+6.8
Labour	William Henderson	11,807	46.0	−6.8
Majority		2,079	8.0	N/A
Turnout		25,693	81.8	+13.3
Registered electors		31,396		
Unionist gain from Labour		Swing	+6.8	

General election 1929: Enfield
Party	Candidate	Votes	%	±%
Labour	William Henderson	14,427	43.3	−2.7
Unionist	Reginald Applin	14,169	42.5	−11.5
Liberal	Charles Herbert Durrad-Lang	4,736	14.2	New
Majority		258	0.8	N/A
Turnout		33,332	78.5	−3.3
Registered electors		42,481		
Labour gain from Unionist		Swing	+4.4	

=== Elections in the 1930s ===
General election 1931: Enfield
Party	Candidate	Votes	%	±%
Conservative	Reginald Applin	24,532	64.3	+21.8
Labour	William Mellor	13,646	35.7	−7.6
Majority		10,886	28.6	N/A
Turnout		38,178	79.2	+0.7
Conservative gain from Labour		Swing		

General election 1935: Enfield
Party	Candidate	Votes	%	±%
Conservative	Bartle Bull	24,046	56.5	−7.8
Labour	William Mellor	18,543	43.5	+7.8
Majority		5,503	13.0	−15.6
Turnout		42,589	73.2	−6.0
Conservative hold		Swing	-7.8	

General Election 1939–40

Another General Election was required to take place before the end of 1940. The political parties had been making preparations for an election to take place and by the Autumn of 1939, the following candidates had been selected;

- Conservative: Bartle Bull
- Labour: Ernest Davies

=== Elections in the 1940s ===
General election 1945: Enfield
Party	Candidate	Votes	%	±%
Labour	Ernest Davies	32,625	52.1	+8.6
Conservative	Bartle Bull	20,935	33.4	−23.1
Liberal	John Patrick Cyril Danny	9,104	14.5	New
Majority		11,690	18.7	N/A
Turnout		62,664	74.4	+1.2
Labour gain from Conservative		Swing	+15.8	
