= Tottenham South =

Parliamentary constituency in the United Kingdom, 1918–1950

- Former borough constituency for the House of Commons

1918–1950
- Seats: one
- Created from: Tottenham
- Replaced by: Tottenham

Tottenham South was a parliamentary constituency in Tottenham, in North London. It returned one Member of Parliament (MP) to the House of Commons of the Parliament of the United Kingdom.

== History ==
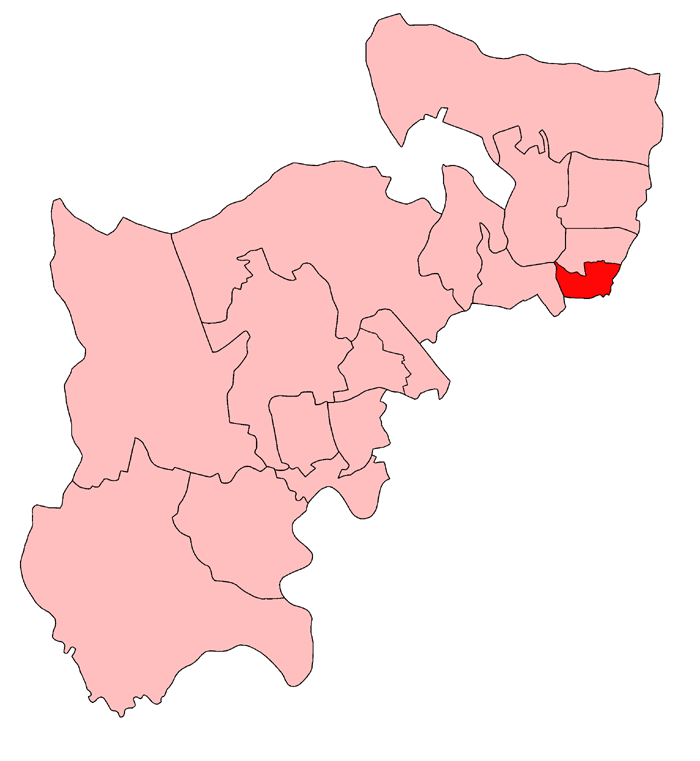
Tottenham South in Middlesex, 1918–1950

The constituency was created for the 1918 general election, and abolished for the 1950 general election.

== Boundaries ==
The Urban District of Tottenham wards of Harringay, High Cross, and St Ann's.

== Members of Parliament ==
Year	Member	Whip
1918	Patrick Malone	Unionist
1923	Percy Alden	Labour
1924	Patrick Malone	Unionist
1929	Frederick Messer	Labour
1931	Francis Noel Palmer	National Labour
1935	Frederick Messer	Labour
1950	constituency abolished	

== Elections ==
=== Elections in the 1910s ===
General election 1918: Tottenham South
Party	Candidate	Votes	%	±%
Unionist	Patrick Bernard Malone	6,632	42.4	
Labour	Leo Money	5,779	37.0	
National Democratic	Albert Ernest Harvey	1,916	12.3	
NFDDSS	Albert Edward Jay	1,295	8.3	
Majority		853	5.4	
Turnout		15,622	45.3	
Unionist win (new seat)				

- no candidate was endorsed by Coalition Government

=== Elections in the 1920s ===
General election 1922: Tottenham South
Party	Candidate	Votes	%	±%
Unionist	Patrick Bernard Malone	9,903	44.5	+2.1
Labour	R. H. Tawney	8,241	37.1	+0.1
Liberal	Arthur Musgrove Mathews	4,081	18.4	New
Majority		1,602	7.4	+2.0
Turnout		22,225	63.8	+18.5
Unionist hold		Swing	+1.0	

Percy Alden

General election 1923: Tottenham South
Party	Candidate	Votes	%	±%
Labour	Percy Alden	10,312	46.9	+9.8
Unionist	Patrick Bernard Malone	7,687	35.0	−9.5
Liberal	Alfred George Newell	3,974	18.1	−0.3
Majority		2,625	11.9	N/A
Turnout		21,973	62.5	−1.3
Labour gain from Unionist		Swing		

General election 1924: Tottenham South
Party	Candidate	Votes	%	±%
Unionist	Patrick Bernard Malone	13,600	52.9	+17.9
Labour	Percy Alden	12,099	47.1	+0.2
Majority		1,501	5.8	N/A
Turnout		25,699	71.9	+9.3
Unionist gain from Labour		Swing	+8.8	

General election 1929: Tottenham South
Party	Candidate	Votes	%	±%
Labour	Frederick Messer	14,423	46.5	−0.6
Unionist	Patrick Bernard Malone	9,701	31.3	−21.6
Liberal	William John Stonestreet	6,407	20.7	New
Communist	Henry Sara	490	1.6	New
Majority		4,722	15.2	N/A
Turnout		31,021	67.5	−4.4
Labour gain from Unionist		Swing	+10.5	

=== Elections in the 1930s ===
General election 1931: Tottenham South
Party	Candidate	Votes	%	±%
National Labour	Francis Noel Palmer	17,824	58.6	N/A
Labour	Frederick Messer	12,602	41.4	−5.1
Majority		5,222	17.2	N/A
Turnout		30,426	65.4	−2.1
National Labour gain from Labour		Swing		

General election 1935: Tottenham South
Party	Candidate	Votes	%	±%
Labour	Frederick Messer	15,834	58.5	+17.1
National Labour	Francis Noel Palmer	11,221	41.5	−17.1
Majority		4,613	17.0	N/A
Turnout		27,055	60.5	−4.9
Labour gain from National Labour		Swing	+17.1	

General Election 1939–40

Another General Election was required to take place before the end of 1940. The political parties had been making preparations for an election to take place and by the Autumn of 1939, the following candidates had been selected;

- Labour: Frederick Messer

=== Elections in the 1940s ===
General election 1945: Tottenham South
Party	Candidate	Votes	%	±%
Labour	Frederick Messer	18,335	73.3	+14.8
Conservative	Arthur Bateman	4,480	17.9	New
Independent National	Archibald Church	2,193	8.8	New
Majority		13,855	55.4	+38.4
Turnout		25,008	69.0	+8.5
Labour hold		Swing		
