= Reginald Applin =

British military officer and politician

Lt-Colonel Reginald Applin DSO, OBE
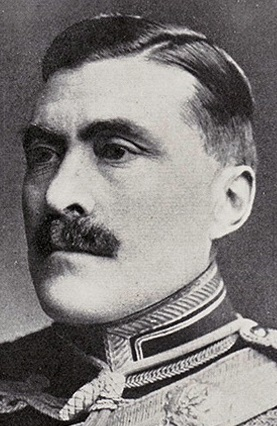

Member of Parliament for Enfield
- In office 29 October 1924 – 30 May 1929
- Prime Minister: Stanley Baldwin
- Preceded by: William Henderson
- Succeeded by: William Henderson
- In office 27 October 1931 – 14 November 1935
- Prime Minister: Stanley Baldwin
- Preceded by: William Henderson
- Succeeded by: Bartle Brennen Bull

Personal details
- Born: 11 April 1869
- Died: 5 April 1957 (aged 87) Howick, Natal, Union of South Africa
- Party: National Party, Anti-Waste League, Conservative and Unionist Party

Lieutenant-Colonel Reginald Vincent Kempenfelt Applin, DSO, OBE (11 April 1869 – 5 April 1957) was a British military officer who took a prominent part in the development of machine gun tactics in the British Army. He later entered politics, initially in two minor right wing parties before becoming a Conservative Party Member of Parliament.

== British North Borneo Company ==
Flag of British North Borneo

He was the eldest son of Captain Vincent Jesson Applin, Military Train, of "Exeview", Alphington, near Exeter. Following education at Sherborne School, he initially sought employment as a stage actor. However, in December 1889 he became a cadet with the British North Borneo Company. He continued to serve in the company's administration of the protectorate, becoming successively a police magistrate and justice of the peace for Labuan and a District Officer. He was involved in the suppression of the Mat Salleh Rebellion from 1895 to 1897 and was awarded the Punitive Expeditions Medal and clasp. After eight years service Applin had reached the rank of Captain Superintendent in the British North Borneo Constabulary, but was forced to resign due to ill health and returned to England. He wrote an account of his years in North Borneo entitled Across the Seven Seas.

== Military service ==
=== Second Boer War ===
In November 1898 Applin obtained a commission as a captain in the 6th (7th Royal Lancashire Militia) Battalion, Lancashire Fusiliers. With the outbreak of the Second Anglo-Boer War in 1899 the battalion was mobilised and sailed to South Africa. He was appointed District Commissioner at Bloemfontein in June 1900 and acting Provost-Marshal for the Orange River in October of the same year. He subsequently saw active service in the Cape Colony, the Orange Free State and the Transvaal, and was twice mentioned in despatches. In April 1902 he was granted the local rank of captain in the Army whilst serving with a provisional battalion, and the following August he transferred to the Royal Garrison Regiment. For his service in the war, he was made a Companion of the Distinguished Service Order (DSO) in the October 1902 South African Honours list. The following year he was appointed Brigade Major of Royal Artillery at Gibraltar.

=== Development of machine gun tactics ===
In July 1905 he transferred to a regular line regiment, the 14th (King's) Hussars. In August of the same year he was seconded to the General Staff and was appointed Deputy Assistant Adjutant General for Musketry in Malta. In December 1906 Applin returned to his regiment, and in June 1911 promoted to major. During this period he was involved in developing tactics for the use of the machine gun, and in 1909 published one of the first books on the subject, Machine Gun Tactics.

=== First World War ===
During the First World War Applin became an instructor in the use of the machine gun, and was attached to the Machine Gun Corps Training Centre in July 1916. In November 1916 he was appointed temporary lieutenant-colonel, and commanded the machine guns of the II ANZAC Corps at the battles of Messines and Passchendaele. With the entry of the United States into the war, Applin was part of a British mission to the country, and gave lectures on machine gun tactics. He remained with the MGC until July 1919.

In January 1919 Applin was given the brevet rank of lieutenant-colonel and in February was made commanding officer of the 14th Hussars. He retired from the army in January 1921.

== Politics ==
With the ending of his military career, Applin entered politics. After making two unsuccessful attempts to enter parliament with minor parties, he became the Conservative MP for Enfield.

=== Dartford by-election 1920 ===
Applin was originally a member of the National Party, a xenophobic party that broke away from the Conservatives in 1917. He stood at the parliamentary by-election at Dartford in April 1920. The party came in a poor fourth place, with Applin losing his deposit. The intervention of the National Party and an Independent candidate split the Conservative vote and allowed John Edmund Mills of the Labour Party to secure an unexpected victory. The National Party was disbanded a year later.

=== Abbey by-election 1921 ===
In August 1921 a parliamentary byelection was held for the constituency of Westminster Abbey. Applin stood as the candidate of Anti-Waste League, a right-wing party formed by Lord Rothermere in opposition to the spending plans of the Lloyd George Coalition government. Such was the unpopularity of the government that all three candidates, including the winner Brigadier-General John Nicholson of the Conservative Party (who formed part of the coalition), claimed to be "anti-waste". Applin finished in second place, receiving 34.9% of the votes cast.

=== Member of Parliament for Enfield ===
In September 1924 Applin was chosen as the Conservative Party's candidate to contest the north London seat of Enfield. The seat had been won by William Henderson of the Labour Party at the general election of 1923. When a further election was held in October of that year, he was elected with a majority of 2,079 votes in a straight fight with Henderson. At the next general election in 1929, Applin again faced Henderson as well as a Liberal candidate. Henderson regained the seat for Labour by the narrow margin of 258 votes. Following the collapse of the minority Labour Government, a National Government was formed in August 1931 and an election was held in October of the same year. Applin was the Conservative and National Government candidate, and was returned to the Commons when he defeated his Labour opponent by the large majority of 10,886 votes. He retired from parliament at the 1935 general election.

== Later life ==
In 1935 he emigrated to South Africa. He died at his home in Howick, Natal in April 1957 aged 87. His medals were auctioned in 2009.

Parliament of the United Kingdom
| Preceded by William Henderson | Member of Parliament for Enfield; 1924 – 1929 | Succeeded by William Henderson |
| Preceded by William Henderson | Member of Parliament for Enfield; 1931 – 1935 | Succeeded by Bartle Brennen Bull |
