= Enfield East =

Parliamentary constituency in the United Kingdom, 1950–1974

- Former borough constituency for the House of Commons
- County: 1950–1965: Middlesex; 1965–1974: Greater London

1950–1974
- Seats: One
- Created from: Enfield
- Replaced by: Edmonton and Enfield North

Enfield East was a constituency which returned one Member of Parliament (MP) to the House of Commons of the Parliament of the United Kingdom. It was created for the 1950 general election and abolished for the February 1974 general election.

== Boundaries ==
The Urban District of Enfield wards of Central, North East, and South East.

== Members of Parliament ==
Election	Member	Party
1950	Ernest Davies	Labour
1959	John Mackie	Labour
1974	constituency abolished	

== Elections ==
=== Elections in the 1950s ===
General election 1950: Enfield East
Party	Candidate	Votes	%	±%
Labour	Ernest Davies	24,013	59.3	
Conservative	Colin Turner	13,110	32.4	
Liberal	Alfred Bramwell Tyler	3,368	8.3	
Majority		10,903	26.9	
Turnout		37,123		
Labour win (new seat)				

General election 1951: Enfield East
Party	Candidate	Votes	%	±%
Labour	Ernest Davies	25,298	63.42	
Conservative	Colin Turner	14,594	36.58	
Majority		10,704	26.84	
Turnout		39,892	82.58	
Labour hold		Swing		

General election 1955: Enfield East
Party	Candidate	Votes	%	±%
Labour	Ernest Davies	21,658	60.81	
Conservative	James Lionel Manning	13,957	39.19	
Majority		7,701	21.62	
Turnout		35,615	75.46	
Labour hold		Swing		

General election 1959: Enfield East
Party	Candidate	Votes	%	±%
Labour	John Mackie	20,101	54.95	
Conservative	Francis J V Brown	16,477	45.05	
Majority		3,624	9.90	
Turnout		36,578	77.52	
Labour hold		Swing		

=== Elections in the 1960s ===
General election 1964: Enfield East
Party	Candidate	Votes	%	±%
Labour	John Mackie	17,958	51.12	
Conservative	Francis J V Brown	11,447	32.59	
Liberal	Julian Francis Burnett	5,723	16.29	New
Majority		6,511	18.53	
Turnout		35,128	76.29	
Labour hold		Swing		

General election 1966: Enfield East
Party	Candidate	Votes	%	±%
Labour	John Mackie	18.772	54.88	
Conservative	Robin Hubert Leach	11,245	32.87	
Liberal	Julian Francis Burnett	4,189	12.25	New
Majority		7,527	21.99	
Turnout		34,206	75.20	
Labour hold		Swing		

=== Elections in the 1970s ===
General election 1970: Enfield East
Party	Candidate	Votes	%	±%
Labour	John Mackie	16,433	51.02	
Conservative	Trevor ET Weston	12,403	38.51	
Liberal	Anthony A Stowell	3,373	10.47	
Majority		4,030	12.51	
Turnout		32,209	66.68	
Labour hold		Swing		
