= Patrick Malone (British politician) =

Major Sir Patrick Bernard Malone (17 March 1859 – 31 December 1939) was a British Conservative politician.

Malone moved to Tottenham, Middlesex, in the 1880s, a period when it was rapidly developing as a suburb of London. He became involved in the public life of the town and was elected to Tottenham Urban District Council and was a justice of the peace. He was also a member of the Lee Conservancy Board and of the Metropolitan Water Board, and he co-founded the Tottenham War Services Institute in 1920.

In 1918 he was nominated to contest the new constituency of Tottenham South as the candidate of the Conservative Party. There was some confusion over his candidacy as he expected to be endorsed as the representative of the coalition government. However he failed to receive the coalition coupon due to differences among activists in the constituency. Both he and A E Hervey, a "Democratic Labour and Coalition" candidate fought the election as supporters of the government. They were opposed by Sir Leo Chiozza Money, the official Labour Party candidate and A. E. Jay of the National Federation of Discharged Sailors and Soldiers. Malone won the seat, with a slim majority of 853 votes over Labour. At the next contest in 1922, Malone held the seat with an increased majority of 1,602 votes. However, a year later Percy Alden of the Labour Party unseated him. He regained the seat a year later, with a majority of 1,501 votes. At the next election in 1929, an increase in the Labour vote saw Malone lose the seat to Frederick Messer in a four-cornered contest, with Liberal and Communist candidates also taking part.

Although the 1929 election saw the end of Malone's parliamentary career, he continued in local politics. When Tottenham was granted a charter of incorporation to become a borough in 1934, he was chosen as the town's first mayor. In the following year he was created the first honorary freeman of the borough. He was also a member of the Middlesex County Council, serving as an alderman from 1925 to 1937. In 1932 he was knighted "for political and public services".

He was twice married: firstly to Mary Sabina Benkut of Bavaria, and secondly to Anetta Slater. He died in December 1939, and was buried in Kensal Green Cemetery.

Parliament of the United Kingdom
New constituency	Member of Parliament for Tottenham South; 1918 – 1923	Succeeded by Percy Alden
Preceded by Percy Alden	Member of Parliament for Tottenham South; 1924 – 1929	Succeeded by Frederick Messer
