= Percy Alden =

British politician

Sir Percy Alden
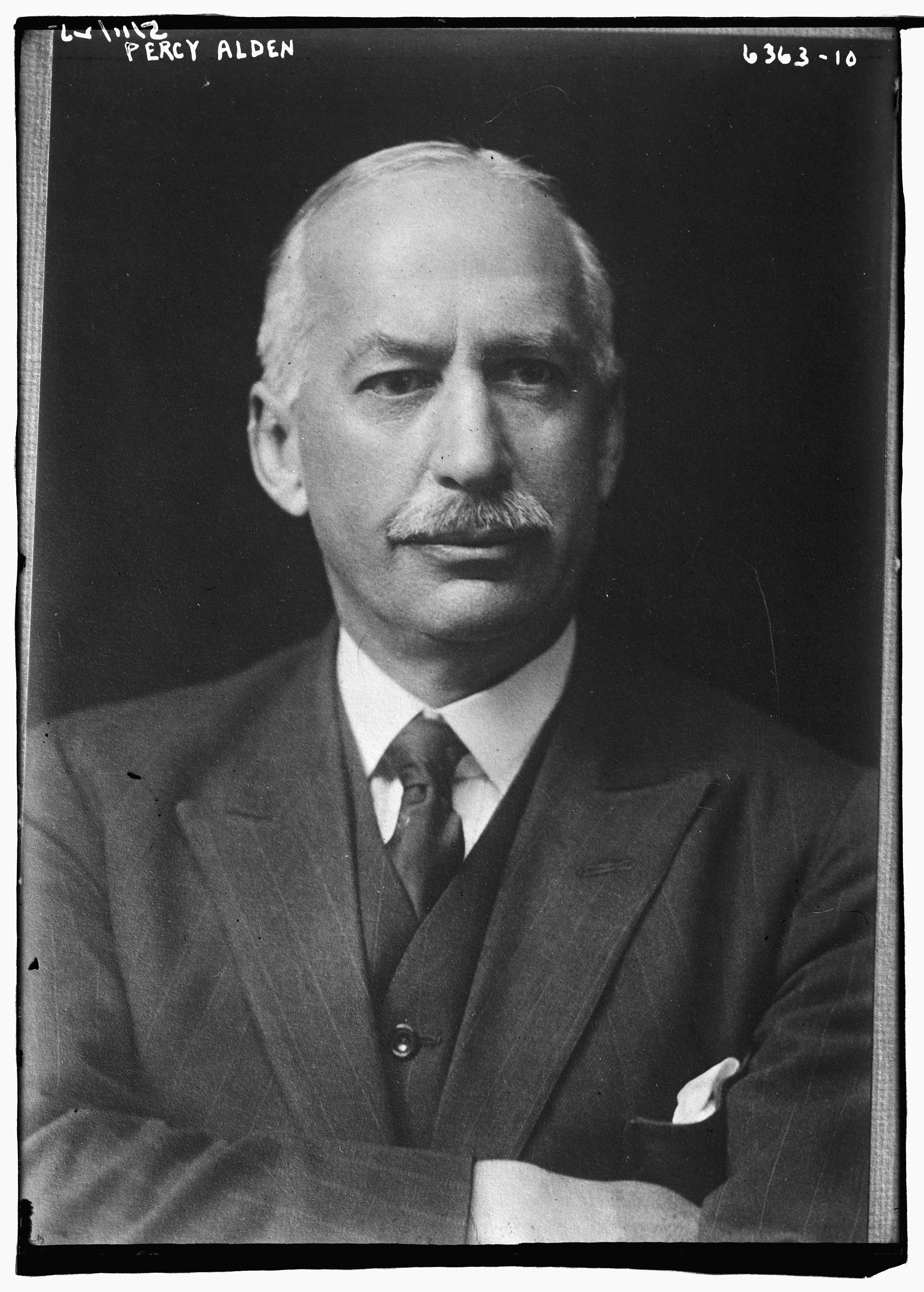

Member of Parliament for Tottenham
- In office 1906–1918
- Preceded by: Joseph Howard
- Succeeded by: Constituency abolished

Member of Parliament for Tottenham South
- In office 1923–1924
- Preceded by: Patrick Malone
- Succeeded by: Patrick Malone

Personal details
- Born: 6 June 1865 Oxford, England
- Died: 30 June 1944 (aged 79) London, England
- Cause of death: V-1 flying bomb
- Party: Liberal
- Other political affiliations: Labour
- Education: Balliol College, Oxford
- Profession: Social worker

Sir Percy Alden (6 June 1865 – 30 June 1944) was a British social worker, land reformer and radical Liberal Party politician.

Born in Oxford, he was the third son of Isaac Alden, a master butcher and Harriet née Kemp. After serving twice as a member of parliament, he was killed in June 1944 by a German V-1 flying bomb.

== Education ==
At the age of 15, while working as a messenger for the local examinations board, he met the philosopher T. H. Green. Green encouraged him to enter the University of Oxford. In 1884 he was admitted to Balliol College, graduating with a third in classical moderations in 1886 and literae humaniores in 1888. He subsequently began studies for the Congregational ministry at Mansfield House, Oxford. Here, he became involved in social work, and was appointed in 1891 as the first warden of the Mansfield House settlement in Canning Town, West Ham, a post he held until 1901, later serving as honorary warden and vice-president.

== Municipal politics ==
From 1892 to 1901, he was a member of the West Ham Borough Council, serving as deputy mayor in 1898. He was a supporter, but not a member, of the Independent Labour Party group that controlled the council West Ham was one of the most deprived areas in London with high unemployment and Alden was the instigator of a petition from the borough council to parliament seeking government action on the problem. He married Dr Margaret Pearse, senior resident physician of the Canning Town Medical Mission Hospital, in 1899 and they had three daughters. He was co-opted onto the London School Board in 1903.

== Parliamentary politics ==
Following his resignation from the Mansfield House Settlement, Alden remained involved in radical politics. In 1902 he became secretary of the National Unemployed Committee, and in 1903 joined The Rainbow Circle, a progressive discussion group of Liberals and Socialists. In the following year he was among a group of Circle members who helped form the British Institute of Social Service. In addition to being a member of the Liberal Party, Alden was a member of the Fabian Society.

At the 1906 general election, Alden was elected as Liberal MP for Tottenham, with a 21% swing from the Conservatives.

As an MP, he took a strong interest in civil liberties (pressing for Hindu interpreters in British prisons, for example), international issues and unemployment.

Alden was re-elected for Tottenham in both the January 1910 and December 1910 general elections. His opposition to conscription in 1916, and support for conscientious objectors, brought him into conflict with some of his Liberal Party colleagues. When the party split into two factions in 1918, Alden was part of the anti-coalition Liberals led by H H Asquith. He was the party's candidate in the new seat of Tottenham North at the 1918 general election, where he was defeated by a Coalition Conservative.

In April 1919, Alden joined the Labour Party, but he was unsuccessful as the party's candidate at Luton at the 1922 general election.

A further general election was held in 1923, and Alden was elected as Labour MP for Tottenham South His return to parliament was to be brief, however, as he lost his seat when a further election was held in 1924.

=== Life outside parliament ===
Alden became disillusioned with the Labour Party when the First Labour Government led by Ramsay MacDonald had ended in failure. He instead returned to the Liberals in 1927, attracted by their policies on relieving unemployment. He did not re-enter active politics, devoting himself instead to charitable work. He was chairman of the Save the Children Fund, administered a number of educational trusts for the underprivileged and worked with groups for the relief of refugees.

Alden wrote a number of books on the subject of social reform, including The Unemployed – A Social Question, The Unemployable and Democratic England. Among other proposals, he was keen to see a rebalancing of England's population towards the land and away from the cities. He supported the garden city movement and land settlement, as well as putting a case for farm colonies to train the unemployed. He was knighted in 1933.

Alden died during the Second World War when a German V-1 flying bomb exploded in Tottenham Court Road on the morning of 30 June 1944. The missile came down at the junction of Howland Street and Tottenham Court Road and caused a large number of casualties.

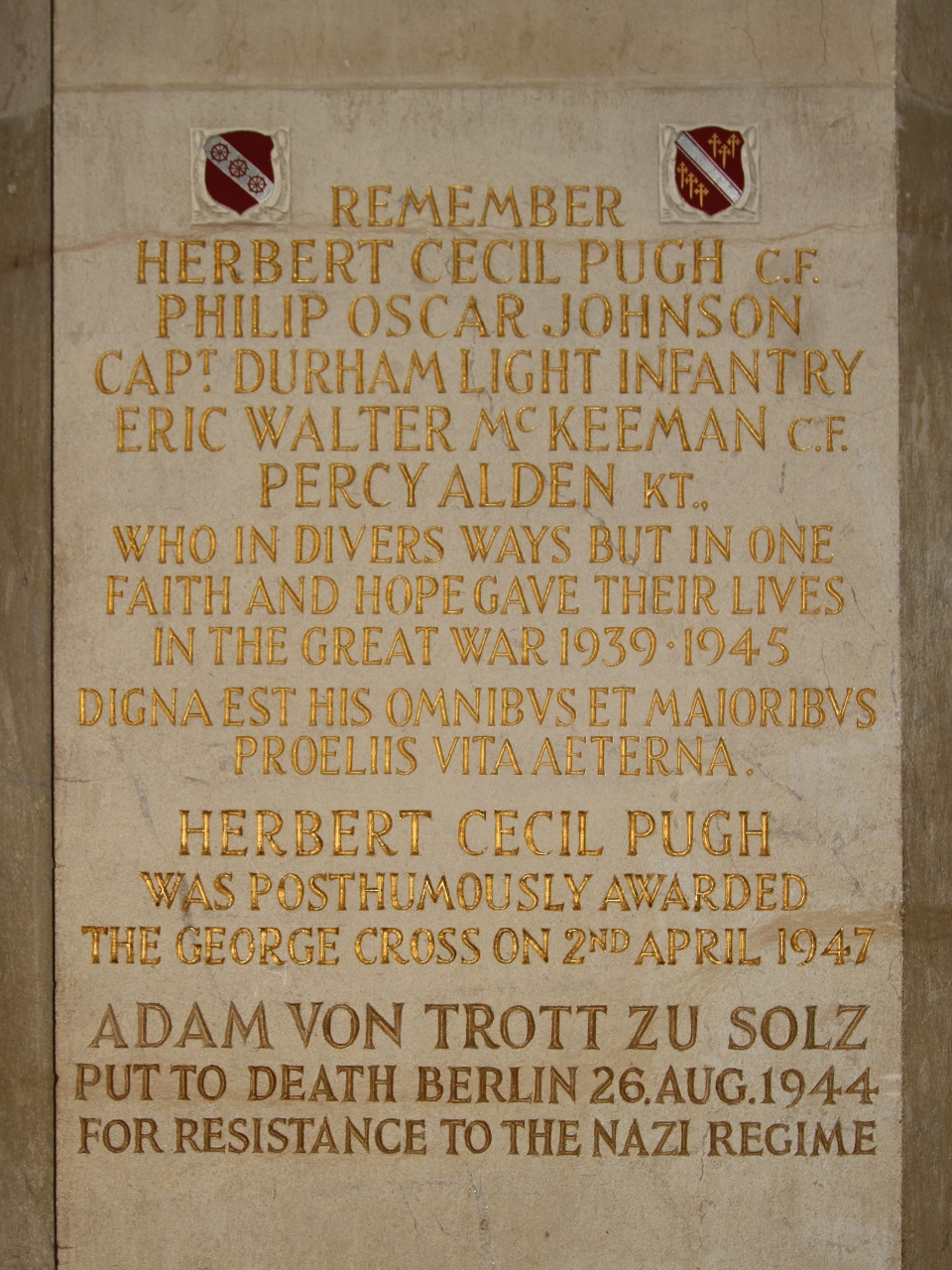
Inscription in the chapel of Mansfield College, Oxford in memory of alumni including Alden

=== Monuments and memorials ===
A Percy Alden Scholarship, to enable a student to attend university followed by a year's training in social work, was established in his memory.

There is a monument to Alden at Balliol College, on the east wall of the Chapel passage.

An inscription in the chapel of Mansfield College, Oxford commemorates alumni killed in the Second World War, including Alden.

Parliament of the United Kingdom
Preceded by Joseph Howard	Member of Parliament for Tottenham; 1906 – 1918	Constituency abolished
Preceded by Patrick Bernard Malone	Member of Parliament for Tottenham South; 1923 – 1924	Succeeded by Patrick Bernard Malone
