= Patrick Bishop =

British politician (1900–1972)

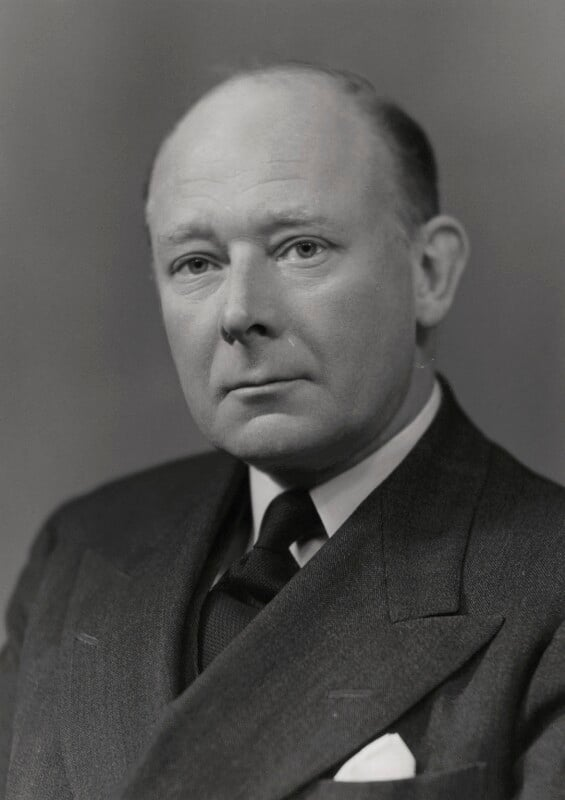
Bishop in 1953

Sir Frank Patrick Bishop, MBE (7 March 1900 – 5 October 1972) was a British advertising copywriter, barrister, businessman and Conservative Party politician.

== Early career ==
Bishop was born in Tottenham, London, and went to Tottenham Grammar School. At the age of 17, he became an assistant copywriter in the advertising department of The Times, but soon left for war service in the Royal Flying Corps in France. On demobilisation in 1919, he rejoined The Times, while studying law in his spare time at King's College London. He was called to the Bar by Gray's Inn in 1924.

== Advertising ==
From 1927, Bishop was chairman of the Advertising Association's committee on patent medicine advertising standards. He also headed the association's investigation department until 1934. He kept up his work for The Times while working as a barrister, using the combination of the two to write the definitive book Advertising and the Law, which was published in 1928. In the same year, Bishop was appointed advertising manager of The Times, a demanding post as the newspaper felt its reputation depended on the claims made in the adverts being scrupulously checked.

== Wartime activities ==
As Assistant Manager of The Times from 1937, Bishop found himself responsible for making arrangements to continue the publication of the paper during the Second World War. During the Blitz, he was often on the roof, putting out incendiary devices dropped by the Luftwaffe. He joined the Home Guard and became second in command of its 'press battalion', for which he was awarded the MBE in December 1944. He wrote further books about the ethics of advertising in the late 1940s.

== Business career ==
Soon after the end of the war, Bishop left The Times to join Broadcast Relay, and he became a Director of Rediffusion. From 1947, he was also general manager of the Newsprint Supply Company. This was a company jointly set up by the newspaper industry to manage the supply of paper, then still in short supply due to rationing; the company was in an uneasy position between the government, who controlled rationing, and the newspapers, who were seeking to sell more copies and so increase their print run. He was at the company for ten years.

== Politics ==
Having been active in local politics, and assisting in the rebuilding of the Conservative Party after its 1945 election defeat, Bishop was asked to stand for Parliament. At the 1950 general election Bishop was elected as Conservative Member of Parliament for Harrow Central.

== Parliament ==
He proved a moderate MP (he supported a coalition between the Conservative Party and the Liberals), who often sought to balance competing interests. When a Labour MP put forward a Bill to establish a General Council of the Press, Bishop put the case for a voluntary system of regulation, which he was able to inform the House was close to agreement. However he was strongly offended by the way the "Red Cross Society of China" (a body unrelated to the International Red Cross and Red Crescent Movement) inserted Communist propaganda in letters sent home by British forces taken prisoner in the Korean War.

== Later career ==
When newsprint rationing ended, Bishop became chairman of Morphy Richards, the consumer electrical company in 1957. He supported the Public Bodies (Admission of the Press to Meetings) Bill promoted by Margaret Thatcher in 1960, a Bill prompted by the decision of some Labour-controlled councils to refuse admission to the press where the newspapers involved were in the middle of an industrial dispute. Morphy Richards were taken over by EMI in 1960, a move opposed by Bishop and which led to his resignation that December.

Bishop was advised in 1962 to end his Parliamentary career on medical grounds, and therefore announced that he would stand down. He was awarded a knighthood in the New Years' Honours list of 1964. He finally left the Rediffusion Board in 1970.

He is buried in the churchyard of St Mary's church in Polstead, Suffolk.

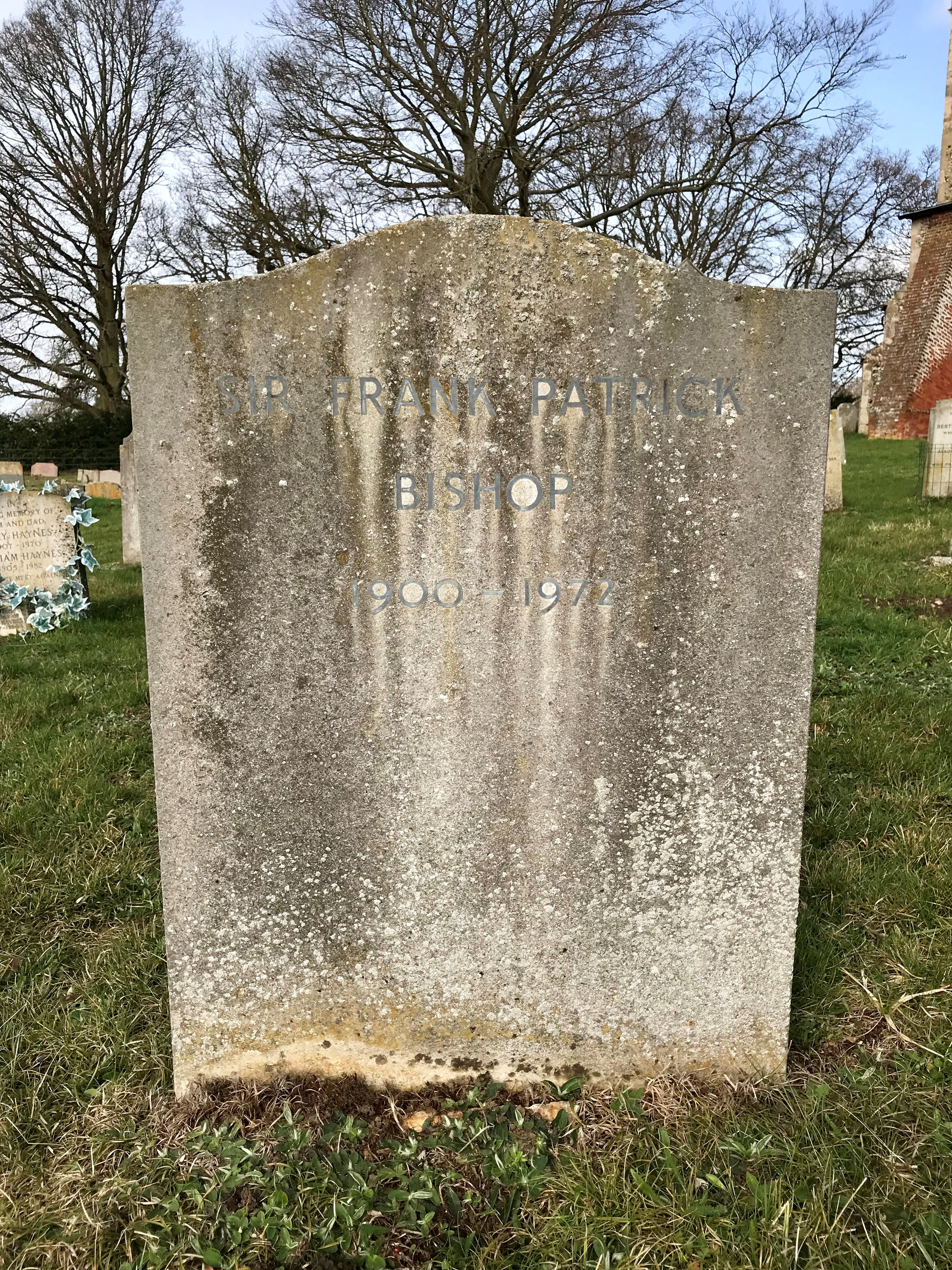
Bishop's grave in the churchyard of St Mary, Polstead, Suffolk

Parliament of the United Kingdom
New constituency	Member of Parliament for Harrow Central; 1950–1964	Succeeded by Anthony Grant
