= Wembley North =

Parliamentary constituency in the United Kingdom, 1945–1974

- Former borough constituency for the House of Commons

1945–February 1974
- Seats: one
- Created from: Hendon and Harrow
- Replaced by: Brent North

Wembley North was a parliamentary constituency in what was then the Borough of Wembley in North-West London. It returned one Member of Parliament (MP) to the House of Commons of the Parliament of the United Kingdom, elected by the first-past-the-post voting system.

== History ==
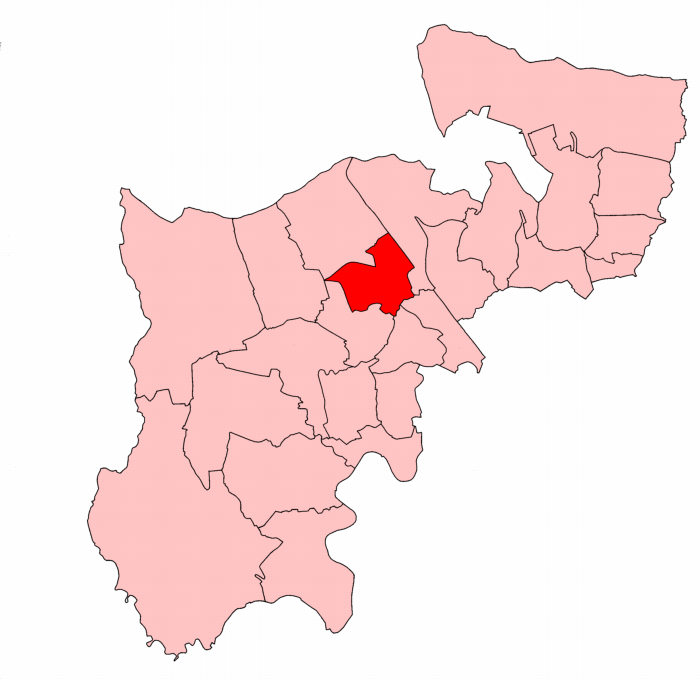
Wembley North constituency within the county of Middlesex, boundaries 1945–50

Map that gives each named seat and any constant electoral success for national (Westminster) elections for Middlesex, 1955 to 1974.

The constituency was created at the 1945 general election, and abolished at the February 1974 general election.

== Boundaries ==
The Municipal Borough of Wembley wards of Chalkhill, Fryent, Kenton, Preston, Roe Green, and The Hyde.

== Members of Parliament ==
Election	Member	Party
1945	Charles Hobson	Labour
1950	Eric Bullus	Conservative
Feb 1974	constituency abolished: see Brent North	

== Elections ==
=== Elections in the 1940s ===
General election 1945: Wembley North
Party	Candidate	Votes	%	±%
Labour	Charles Hobson	15,677	43.62	
Conservative	Peter Scott	15,245	42.42	
Liberal	Ian Clive Baillieu	5,019	13.96	
Majority		432	1.20	
Turnout		35,941	76.82	
Labour win (new seat)				

=== Elections in the 1950s ===
General election 1950: Wembley North
Party	Candidate	Votes	%	±%
Conservative	Eric Bullus	22,430	51.94	
Labour Co-op	Bernard Lewis	14,987	34.70	
Liberal	Bernard Dann	5,770	13.36	
Majority		7,443	17.24	N/A
Turnout		43,187	88.47	
Conservative gain from Labour		Swing		

General election 1951: Wembley North
Party	Candidate	Votes	%	±%
Conservative	Eric Bullus	24,112	55.93	
Labour Co-op	Bernard Lewis	15,394	35.71	
Liberal	Richard Arden Winch	3,607	8.37	
Majority		8,718	20.22	
Turnout		43,113	87.13	
Conservative hold		Swing		

General election 1955: Wembley North
Party	Candidate	Votes	%	±%
Conservative	Eric Bullus	22,701	56.46	
Labour	Jane Phillips	12,592	31.32	
Liberal	Ruth Abrahams	4,916	12.23	
Majority		10,109	25.14	
Turnout		40,209	82.27	
Conservative hold		Swing		

General election 1959: Wembley North
Party	Candidate	Votes	%	±%
Conservative	Eric Bullus	22,211	56.2	−0.3
Labour	Ronald M Lewis	11,131	28.2	−3.1
Liberal	Donald G Valentine	6,171	15.6	+3.4
Majority		11,080	28.0	+2.9
Turnout		39,513	83.1	+0.8
Conservative hold		Swing		

=== Elections in the 1960s ===
General election 1964: Wembley North
Party	Candidate	Votes	%	±%
Conservative	Eric Bullus	18,325	49.41	
Labour	Illtyd Harrington	11,960	32.25	
Liberal	William G Crauford	6,805	18.35	
Majority		6,365	17.16	
Turnout		37,090	80.10	
Conservative hold		Swing		

General election 1966: Wembley North
Party	Candidate	Votes	%	±%
Conservative	Eric Bullus	17,497	48.10	
Labour	Kenneth W Childerhouse	13,290	36.54	
Liberal	Philip M R Cowen	5,587	15.36	
Majority		4,207	11.57	
Turnout		36,374	80.93	
Conservative hold		Swing		

=== Elections in the 1970s ===
General election 1970: Wembley North
Party	Candidate	Votes	%	±%
Conservative	Eric Bullus	18,345	53.4	+5.3
Labour	Kenneth W. Childerhouse	11,916	34.7	−1.8
Liberal	John R. Kinsgbury	4,083	11.9	−3.5
Majority		6,249	18.7	+7.1
Turnout		34,344	72.0	−8.9
Conservative hold		Swing		
