= Noel Palmer =

British politician

Francis Noel Palmer

Member of Parliament for Tottenham South
- In office 27 October 1931 – 14 November 1935
- Preceded by: Frederick Messer
- Succeeded by: Frederick Messer

Personal details
- Born: 1887
- Died: 18 January 1961 (aged 73–74)
- Party: Labour (1906–October 1931) National Labour (from October 1931)

Francis Noel Palmer (1887 – 18 January 1961) was a British politician.

He was the son of Nathaniel Palmer of Yarmouth. In 1906, he joined the Labour Party. During the First World War, he was granted a commission as a second lieutenant in the Essex Regiment, but was discharged from the army with tuberculosis. He lived in Normandy, Surrey and was chosen as Labour candidate to contest the local parliamentary constituency of Farnham in 1929. In October 1931 Palmer was expelled from the Labour Party for supporting the National Government, moving into the National Labour Organisation led by the Prime Minister, Ramsay MacDonald.

He was a parliamentary candidate at the 1931 general election at Tottenham South. He unseated the sitting Labour member, Frederick Messer and was one of 13 National Labour MPs elected. The situation was reversed when he lost the seat to Messer at the next general election in 1935. By the 1940s his sand and gravel business was in receivership.

He died in 1961.

Parliament of the United Kingdom
| Preceded by Frederick Messer | Member of Parliament for Tottenham South; 1931 – 1935 | Succeeded by Frederick Messer |
