= Clarence Barton =

British politician

Clarence Barton (21 June 1892 – 15 September 1957) was a British politician.

Born in Pudsey, Barton was educated at the Hanson Memorial Secondary School in Bradford. He became a railway clerk with the London and North Eastern Railway, and joined the Transport Salaried Staffs' Association (TSSA). He also joined the Labour Party, and served on Wembley Borough Council from 1934 until 1949, including a term as Mayor of Wembley in 1942/43.

Barton was Member of Parliament (MP) for Wembley South from 1945 to 1950.

Parliament of the United Kingdom
New constituency	Member of Parliament for Wembley South; 1945 – 1950	Succeeded by Ronald Russell
