= Wembley South =

Parliamentary constituency in the United Kingdom, 1945–1974

- Former borough constituency for the House of Commons

1945–February 1974
- Seats: one
- Created from: Harrow (part of); Hendon (small part of)
- Replaced by: Brent North (part); Brent South (part) (newly created seats)

Wembley South was a constituency in what was then the Borough of Wembley in Middlesex and from 1965 wholly in northwest London. It returned one member (MP) to the House of Commons of the UK Parliament, elected by the first past the post system, returning Conservative apart from in 1945, the victory of the First Attlee ministry when it returned a Labour member.

== History ==
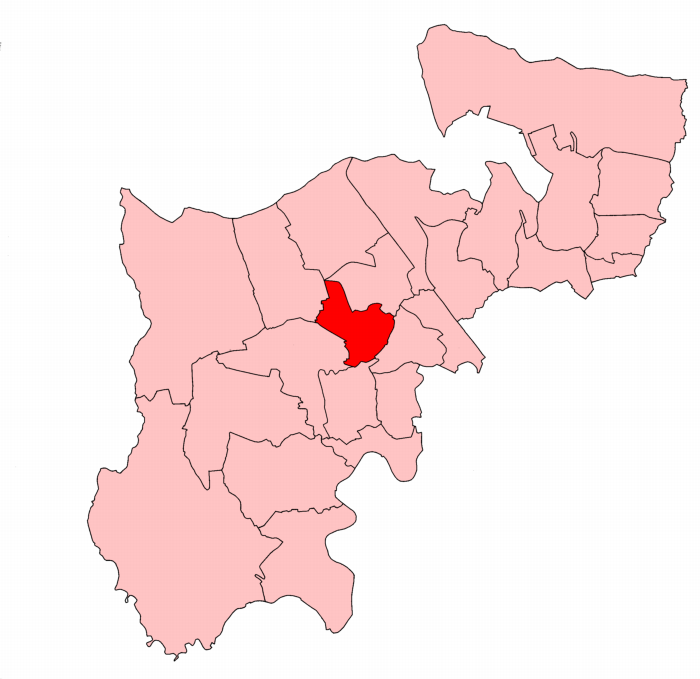
Wembley South in the county of Middlesex, boundaries 1945-50

Map that gives each named seat and any constant electoral success for national (Westminster) elections for Middlesex, 1955 to 1974.

The constituency was created at the 1945 general election, and abolished at the February 1974 general election.

== Boundaries ==
The Municipal Borough of Wembley wards of Alperton, Central, Sudbury, Sudbury Court, Tokyngton, and Wembley Park.

== Members of Parliament ==
Election	Member	Party
1945	Clarence Barton	Labour
1950	Sir Ronald Russell	Conservative
Feb 1974	constituency abolished: see Brent North	

== Elections ==
=== Elections in the 1940s ===
General election 1945: Wembley South
Party	Candidate	Votes	%	±%
Labour	Clarence Barton	16,928	47.84	
Conservative	Noel Whiteside	13,497	38.15	
Liberal	John Jabez Over	4,958	14.01	
Majority		3,431	9.69	
Turnout		35,383	74.95	
Labour win (new seat)				

=== Elections in the 1950s ===
General election 1950: Wembley South
Party	Candidate	Votes	%	±%
Conservative	Ronald Russell	20,920	48.69	
Labour	Clarence Barton	17,251	40.15	
Liberal	Charles Frederick Jackson	4,366	10.16	New
Communist	N Gill	430	1.00	New
Majority		3,669	8.54	N/A
Turnout		42,967	88.27	
Conservative gain from Labour		Swing		

General election 1951: Wembley South
Party	Candidate	Votes	%	±%
Conservative	Ronald Russell	23,380	55.76	
Labour	Douglas Clark	18,546	44.24	
Majority		4,834	11.52	
Turnout		41,926	85.97	
Conservative hold		Swing		

General election 1955: Wembley South
Party	Candidate	Votes	%	±%
Conservative	Ronald Russell	22,052	58.57	
Labour Co-op	Eric C Hutchison	15,596	41.43	
Majority		6,456	17.14	
Turnout		37,648	80.70	
Conservative hold		Swing		

General election 1959: Wembley South
Party	Candidate	Votes	%	±%
Conservative	Ronald Russell	19,733	52.90	
Labour	Edward Mackenzie	12,166	32.61	
Liberal	John EC Perry	5,403	14.48	New
Majority		7,567	20.29	
Turnout		37,302	82.62	
Conservative hold		Swing		

=== Elections in the 1960s ===
General election 1964: Wembley South
Party	Candidate	Votes	%	±%
Conservative	Ronald Russell	16,512	47.97	
Labour	Michael N Elliott	12,199	35.44	
Liberal	John EC Perry	5,713	16.60	
Majority		4,313	12.53	
Turnout		34,424	78,42	
Conservative hold		Swing		

General election 1966: Wembley South
Party	Candidate	Votes	%	±%
Conservative	Ronald Russell	15,377	45.28	
Labour	Michael N Elliott	14,194	41.80	
Liberal	Darcy Conyers	4,386	12.92	
Majority		1,183	3.48	
Turnout		33,957	79.26	
Conservative hold		Swing		

=== Elections in the 1970s ===
General election 1970: Wembley South
Party	Candidate	Votes	%	±%
Conservative	Ronald Russell	16,578	53.6	+8.3
Labour	Michael N. Elliott	14,336	46.4	+4.6
Majority		2,242	7.25	+3.7
Turnout		30,914	68.9	−10.4
Conservative hold		Swing		
