= Sir Henry Bowles, 1st Baronet =

British politician

Bowles in 1895.

Colonel Sir Henry Ferryman Bowles, 1st Baronet (19 December 1858 – 14 October 1943) was a British Army officer and Conservative politician.

== Early life and family ==
He was the eldest son of Henry Carrington Bowles Bowles of Myddelton House, Bulls Cross, Hertfordshire and Cornelia née Kingdom. He was educated at Harrow School and Jesus College, Cambridge, graduating with a Bachelor of Arts degree in 1881 and a master of arts in 1884. He was called to the bar at the Inner Temple in 1883. He married Florence "Dolly" Broughton of Tunstall Hall, Shropshire in 1889. In 1895 he moved to Forty Hall, near Enfield, Middlesex, which his father had purchased in the previous year. His younger brother Gussie was the distinguished horticulturalist E.A. Bowles.

== Military service ==
Bowles had a long association with the reserve forces of the British Army, holding commissions in the Militia, Volunteer Force and Territorial Force. He was first commissioned as a second lieutenant in the King's Own Tower Hamlets Militia in August 1878, and was promoted to the rank of lieutenant in September 1880. Under the Childers Reforms, the Tower Hamlets militia became the 7th Battalion of the Rifle Brigade in 1881. Bowles was promoted to captain in February 1882. He eventually rose to the rank of major and honorary lieutenant colonel of the battalion. In May 1899 he transferred to the 1st Volunteer Battalion of the Middlesex Regiment. When the volunteers were reorganised as the Territorial Force in 1908, Bowles was appointed honorary colonel of the successor 7th Battalion, Middlesex Regiment. During the First World War he was appointed county commandant for volunteer units in Middlesex, and retired at the end of the conflict with rank of colonel.

== Local and parliamentary politics ==
A Conservative in politics, Bowles was one of the original members of the Middlesex County Council, elected to represent Enfield West in 1889. After 20 years as a councillor he was elevated to the position of county alderman in 1909. He retired from the council in 1936, following 47 years of membership.

In March 1889 the sitting Conservative MP for Enfield, Viscount Folkestone, was elevated to the peerage on the death of his father, the Earl of Radnor. Bowles was unanimously chosen by local Conservative and Unionist Association to defend the seat. The main issue in the by-election campaign was Irish Home Rule, and Bowles managed to defeat his Liberal Party opponent by a little over 1,500 votes. He was re-elected at the general elections of 1892, 1895 (unopposed) and 1900. At the 1906 general election there was a large swing to the Liberals, and Bowles was defeated by James Branch.

Twelve years later Bowles returned to parliament at the 1918 general election, when he was elected as the Coalition Conservative MP for the redrawn Enfield constituency. He retired from parliament at the next general election in 1922.

== Other interests ==
He was a justice of the peace for Middlesex for over 50 years, and chairman of the Edmonton Petty Sessional Division for 21 years. He was appointed High Sheriff of Middlesex for 1928. In 1936 he retired from the bench.

In addition to his work on the County Council, Bowles was a long-serving Representative Governor of the Latymer Charity School. During a period of significant local controversy regarding the school's future, he served as a primary link between the school's board and the Middlesex County Council. He was instrumental in the school's 1909 restructuring, proposing the motion that led to the closure of the original Church Street site and the dismissal of the headmaster, W.A.C. Shearer, citing the school's significant bank overdraft and the 'insanitary state' of the premises. As the Council's spokesman, he argued that the school could not continue without adequate buildings or pupils, ultimately paving the way for the school’s relocation to Haselbury Road.

Bowles was an early motoring enthusiast, and was the first president of the Middlesex County Automobile Club retaining the position from 1905 until his death. He was a long serving member of the Court of the Goldsmiths' Company.

== Baronetcy and family ==
In the 1926 Birthday Honours, he was created a baronet, "of Enfield in the County of Middlesex" for public and political services. He suffered a stroke on 13 October 1943, and died on the following day at Enfield War Memorial Hospital aged 84.

His daughter, Wilma Mary Garnault Bowles (d. 1928), married Eustace Parker in 1913. In 1920, Eustace changed his name to Bowles by Royal Licence. His grandson is Andrew Parker Bowles, former husband of Queen Camilla.

Sir Henry's wife had predeceased him in 1935, and the baronetcy became extinct upon his death.

Parliament of the United Kingdom
Preceded by Viscount Folkestone	Member of Parliament for Enfield; 1889 – 1906	Succeeded by James Branch
Preceded by John Pretyman Newman	Member of Parliament for Enfield; 1918 – 1922	Succeeded by Thomas Fermor-Hesketh
Baronetage of the United Kingdom
New creation	Baronet (of Forty Hill); 1926–1943	Extinct
