= Ernest Davies (Enfield MP) =

British journalist, author and politician (1902–1991)

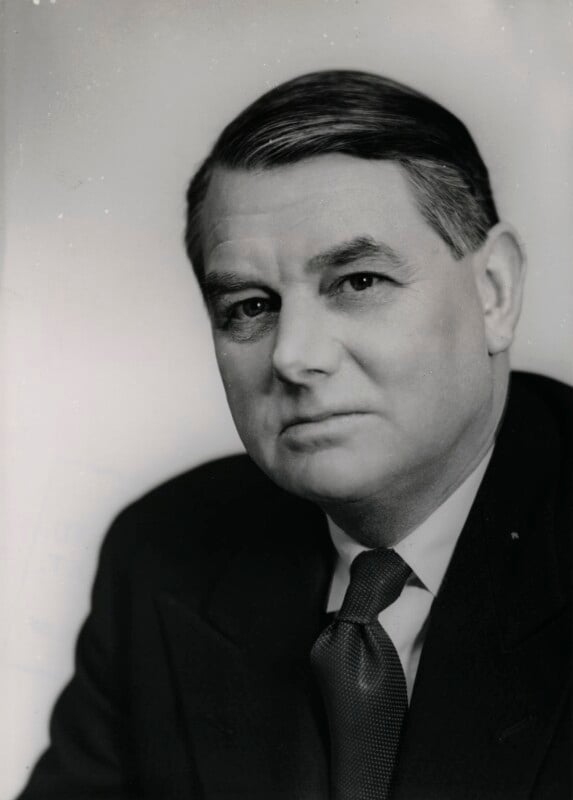
Davies in 1949

Ernest Albert John Davies (18 May 1902 – 16 September 1991) was a British journalist, author and Labour Party politician.

== Early life ==
Born in London, Davies was the son of Albert Emil Davies, a writer, lecturer and prominent Labour Party member of the London County Council. Davies was educated at Wycliffe College and the University of London, graduating with a Diploma in Journalism. In 1922 he travelled to the United States where he worked for a number of years. He married Natalie Rossin of New York in 1926 and the couple had three children.

== Journalism ==
From 1929 until 1932, Davies was editor of The Clarion, a weekly socialist newspaper, and in 1932 became associate editor of its short-lived successor the New Clarion. From 1938 until 1940, he was the Governor for the National Froebel Foundation (an educational foundation). From 1940 to 1945, he worked for the BBC, becoming its North American Service Organiser in 1944. That same year, he divorced his first wife, marrying Peggy Yeo, with whom he had a daughter.

He returned to journalism after he lost his seat in parliament, and was managing editor of Traffic Engineering and Control from 1960–76 and managing editor of Antique Finder from 1962–72.

== Politics ==
Davies joined the Fabian Society in 1919 and the Labour Party in 1924. At the 1935 general election he was the party's candidate for the seat of Peterborough, but failed to be elected.

With elections postponed due to World War II, Davies did not contest another election until 1945. He became Member of Parliament for Enfield, one of many new Labour MPs who were elected in a landslide victory. He was appointed parliamentary private secretary to Hector McNeil, Minister of State at the Foreign Office.

Following boundary changes, Davies was elected to the new constituency of Enfield East at the 1950 general election. He was briefly parliamentary under-secretary of state for Foreign Affairs under Ernest Bevin and Herbert Morrison before Labour lost power at the 1951 general election. He retired from parliament at the 1959 general election.

== Publications ==
- Finance. How money is managed (Editor) (Odhams Press, London, 1935)
- How much Compensation? A problem of transfer from private to public enterprise (Victor Gollancz; New Fabian Research Bureau, London, 1937)
- "National" Capitalism: the government's record as protector of private monopoly (Victor Gollancz, London, 1939)
- The State and the Railways (Victor Gollancz; Fabian Society, London, 1940)
- American Labour: the story of the American trade union movement (George Allen & Unwin; Fabian Society, London, 1943)
- British Transport: a study in industrial organisation and control (Fabian Publications, [London,] 1945)
- National Enterprise: the development of the public corporation (Victor Gollancz, London, 1946)
- Nationalization of Transport (Labour Party, London, [1947])
- Problems of Public Ownership (Labour Party, London, [1952])
- Roads and their Traffic (Editor) (Blackie & Son, London & Glasgow, 1960).
- Britain's Transport Crisis: a socialist's view (Arthur Barker, [London, 1960])
- Traffic Engineering and Control (Managing Editor), 1960–76
- Transport in Greater London (London School of Economics and Political Science: [London,] 1962)
- Antique Finder (Managing Editor), 1962–72
- Traffic Engineering Practice (editor) (E. & F. N. Spon, London, 1963)

The British Library of Political and Economic Science has a collection of papers relating to his political work (dated from approximately 1935 to 1987)

Parliament of the United Kingdom
Preceded by Bartle Brennen Bull	Member of Parliament for Enfield; 1945 – 1950	Constituency abolished
New constituency	Member of Parliament for Enfield East; 1950 – 1959	Succeeded by John Mackie
