= 1945 Tottenham North by-election =

UK parliamentary by-election

The 1945 Tottenham North by-election was a by-election held for the British House of Commons constituency of Tottenham North in London on 13 December 1945.

== Vacancy ==
The seat had become vacant when the sitting Labour Co-operative Member of Parliament (MP), Robert Morrison had been ennobled on 16 November 1945 as Baron Morrison. He had held the seat since the 1935 general election.

== Candidates ==
The Labour Co-operative candidate was 53-year-old William Irving. The Conservative Party candidate was 26-year-old barrister Petre Crowder.

== Result ==
On a much-reduced turnout, Irving held the seat for Labour, with a swing of 8.2% to the Conservatives.

The constituency was abolished for the 1950 general election, when Irving was elected for the new Wood Green constituency, and Crowder was elected for the safe Conservative seat of Ruislip-Northwood.

Tottenham North by-election, 13 December 1945
Party	Candidate	Votes	%	±%
Labour Co-op	William Irving	12,937	63.6	−8.2
Conservative	Petre Crowder	7,415	36.4	+8.2
Majority		5,522	27.2	−16.4
Turnout		20,352	39.5	−30.8
Labour Co-op hold		Swing	-8.2	

== Previous result ==
General election July 1945: Tottenham North
Party	Candidate	Votes	%	±%
Labour Co-op	Robert Morrison	25,360	71.8	+14.6
Conservative	B. H. Berry	9,955	28.2	−7.3
Majority		15,405	43.6	+21.9
Turnout		35,315	70.3	+4.4
Labour Co-op hold		Swing	+10.0	

== See also ==
- Tottenham North (UK Parliament constituency)
- Tottenham
- List of United Kingdom by-elections (1931–1950)

== Sources ==
- Craig, F. W. S. (1983) [1969]. British parliamentary election results 1918-1949 (3rd ed.). Chichester: Parliamentary Research Services. ISBN 0-900178-06-X.
- Leigh Rayment's Historical List of MPs
