= List of Labour and Co-operative Party MPs =

This is a list of British Labour and Co-operative Party MPs. It includes all Members of Parliament (MPs) elected to the House of Commons representing the Co-operative Party from 1918 to 1927, and Labour and Co-operative Party since 1927. Members of the Scottish Parliament or the Senedd are not listed.

Only official Labour and Co-operative MPs who have been formally endorsed by both parties are listed. Although many Labour MPs are also members of the Co-operative Party, they are only endorsed in elections by the Labour Party.

== Members by general election ==
Year	Name	Constituency
1918	Alfred Waterson	Kettering
1922	A. V. Alexander	Sheffield Hillsborough
1922	Alfred Barnes	East Ham South
1922	Tom Henderson	Glasgow Tradeston
1922	Robert Morrison	Tottenham North
1923	A. V. Alexander	Sheffield Hillsborough
1923	Alfred Barnes	East Ham South
1923	Tom Henderson	Glasgow Tradeston
1923	Robert Morrison	Tottenham North
1923	Samuel Perry	Kettering
1923	Andrew Young	Glasgow Partick
1924	A. V. Alexander	Sheffield Hillsborough
1924	Alfred Barnes	East Ham South
1924	Tom Henderson	Glasgow Tradeston
1924	William Hirst	Bradford South
1924	Robert Morrison	Tottenham North
1929	A. V. Alexander	Sheffield Hillsborough
1929	Alfred Barnes	East Ham South
1929	Dan Chater	Hammersmith South
1929	Herbert Gibson	Mossley
1929	Tom Henderson	Glasgow Tradeston
1929	William Hirst	Bradford South
1929	Fred Longden	Birmingham Deritend
1929	Robert Morrison	Tottenham North
1929	Samuel Perry	Kettering
1931	William Leonard	Glasgow St Rollox
1931	A. V. Alexander	Sheffield Hillsborough
1931	Alfred Barnes	East Ham South
1931	Frank Broad	Edmonton
1931	Daniel Chater	Bethnal Green North East
1931	Walter Green	Deptford
1931	Tom Henderson	Glasgow Tradeston
1931	William Leonard	Glasgow St Rollox
1931	Robert Morrison	Tottenham North
1931	George Woods	Finsbury
1945	25 members	
1950	18 members	
1951	16 members	
1955	19 members	
1959	16 members	
1964	19 members	
1966	18 members	
1970	15 members	
1974 February	16 members	
1974 October	16 members	
1979	17 members	
1983	7 members	
1987	9 members	
1992	14 members	
1997	28 members	
2001	30 members	
2005	29 members	
2010	28 members	
2015	24 members	
2017	38 members	
2019	26 members	
2024	43 members	

== Members by surname ==
=== A ===
- Jack Abbott, Ipswich, 2024–present
- William Thomas Adams, Hammersmith South, 1945–1950
- A. V. Alexander, Sheffield Hillsborough, 1922–1931; 1935–1950
- Douglas Alexander, Lothian East, 2024–present (previously Labour MP for Paisley South, 1997–2005; Paisley and Renfrewshire South, 2005–2015)
- Jon Ashworth, Leicester South, 2011–2024

=== B ===
- Adrian Bailey, West Bromwich West, 2000–2019
- Ed Balls, Normanton, 2005–2010; Morley and Outwood, 2010–2015
- Alfred Barnes, East Ham South, 1922–1931; 1935–1955
- Luciana Berger, Liverpool Wavertree, 2010–2019 (later sat as Change UK, independent, and Liberal Democrat for the same seat)
- Frank Beswick, Uxbridge, 1945–1959
- Rachel Blake, Cities of London and Westminster, 2024–present
- Tracy Brabin, Batley and Spen, 2016–2021
- Francis Alfred Broad, Edmonton, 1935–1945 (previously Labour for the same seat, 1922–1931)
- Andy Burnham, Leigh, 2001–2017; Makerfield, 2026–present
- Joyce Butler, Wood Green, 1955–1979

=== C ===
- Daniel Chater, Hammersmith South, 1929–1931; Bethnal Green North East, 1935–1950
- William Coldrick, Bristol North, 1945–1950; Bristol North-East, 1950–1959
- Jim Craigen, Glasgow Maryhill, 1974–1987
- Stella Creasy, Walthamstow, 2010–present

=== D ===
- Percy Daines, East Ham North, 1945–1957
- George Darling, Sheffield Hillsborough, 1950–1974
- Ian Davidson, Glasgow Govan, 1992–1997; Glasgow Pollok, 1997–2005; Glasgow South West, 2005–2015
- Geraint Davies, Swansea West, 2010–2023 (previously Labour MP for Croydon Central, 1997–2005; suspended from party and later sat as an independent)
- Kate Dearden, Halifax, 2024–present
- Jim Dobbin, Heywood and Middleton, 1997–2014
- Anneliese Dodds, Oxford East, 2017–present
- Norman Dodds, Dartford, 1945–1955; Erith and Crayford, 1955–1965
- Helena Dollimore, Hastings and Rye, 2024–present
- Stephen Doughty, Cardiff South and Penarth, 2012–present
- Dick Douglas, Stirlingshire East and Clackmannan, 1970–1974; Dunfermline, 1979–1983; Dunfermline West, 1983–1990 (1990–1992 for Scottish National Party)
- Gemma Doyle, West Dunbartonshire, 2010–2015
- David Drew, Stroud, 1997–2010; 2017–2019

=== E ===
- Robert Edwards, Bilston, 1955–1974; Wolverhampton South East, 1974–1987
- Louise Ellman, Liverpool Riverside, 1997–2019 (later sat as independent for the same seat)
- Florence Eshalomi, Vauxhall, 2019–present
- Chris Evans, Islwyn, 2010–2024; Caerphilly, 2024–present
- Ioan Evans, Birmingham Yardley, 1964–1970; Aberdare, 1974–1983; Cynon Valley, 1983–1984

=== F ===
- Miatta Fahnbulleh, Peckham, 2024–present
- Emma Foody, Cramlington and Killingworth, 2024–present
- John Forman, Glasgow Springburn, 1945–1964
- George Foulkes, South Ayrshire, 1979–1983; Carrick, Cumnock and Doon Valley, 1983–2005

=== G ===
- Caroline Ganley, Battersea South, 1945–1951
- Mike Gapes, Ilford South, 1992–2019 (later sat as Change UK for the same seat)
- Herbert Gibson, Mossley, 1929–1931
- Preet Gill, Birmingham Edgbaston, 2017–present
- Linda Gilroy, Plymouth Sutton, 1997–2010
- Ted Graham, Edmonton, 1974–1983
- Tom Greatrex, Rutherglen and Hamilton West, 2010–2015
- Walter Henry Green, Deptford, 1935–1945
- Andrew Gwynne, Gorton and Denton, 2024–2026 (previously Labour MP for Denton and Reddish, 2005–2024)

=== H ===
- Sarah Hall, Warrington South, 2024–present
- Norman Haseldine, Bradford West, 1966–1970
- Thomas Henderson, Glasgow Tradeston, 1922–1931; 1935–1945
- Mark Hendrick, Preston, 2000–present
- Meg Hillier, Hackney South and Shoreditch, 2005–present
- William Hilton, Bethnal Green, 1966–1974
- William Hirst, Bradford South, 1924–1931
- Percy Holman, Bethnal Green South-West, 1945–1950; Bethnal Green, 1950–1966
- Phil Hope, Corby, 1997–2010
- James Hindle Hudson, Ealing West, 1945–1950; Ealing North, 1950–1955 (previously Labour MP for Huddersfield, 1923–1931)

=== I ===
- Sydney Irving, Dartford, 1955–1970; 1974–1979
- William Irving, Tottenham North, 1945–1950; Wood Green, 1950–1955

=== J ===
- Sally Jameson, Doncaster Central, 2024–present
- Cathy Jamieson, Kilmarnock and Loudon, 2010–2015
- Jon Owen Jones, Cardiff Central, 1997–2005

=== K ===
- Alan Keen, Feltham and Heston, 1992–2011
- Gerard Killen, Rutherglen and Hamilton West, 2017–2019
- Jayne Kirkham, Truro and Falmouth, 2024–present

=== L ===
- Mark Lazarowicz, Edinburgh North and Leith, 2001–2015
- Ron Ledger, Romford, 1955–1970
- William Leonard, Glasgow St. Rollox, 1931–1950
- David Lepper, Brighton Pavilion, 1997–2010
- Chris Leslie, Shipley, 1997–2005; Nottingham East, 2010–2019 (later sat as Change UK)
- Simon Lightwood, Wakefield, 2022–2024; Wakefield and Rothwell, 2024–present
- Frederick Longden, Birmingham Deritend, 1929–1931; 1945–1950; Birmingham Small Heath, 1950–1952
- Andy Love, Edmonton, 1997–2015

=== M ===
- Dickson Mabon, Greenock, 1955–1974; Greenock and Port Glasgow, 1974–1981 (sat as SDP 1981–1983)
- Alice Macdonald, Norwich North, 2024–present
- Seema Malhotra, Feltham and Heston, 2011–present
- Rachael Maskell, York Central, 2015–present
- Tommy McAvoy, Glasgow Rutherglen, 1987–2005; Rutherglen and Hamilton West, 2005–2010
- Sarah McCarthy-Fry, Portsmouth North, 2005–2010
- John McFall, Dumbarton, 1987–2005; West Dunbartonshire, 2005–2010
- Jim McMahon, Oldham West and Royton, 2015–2024; Oldham West, Chadderton and Royton, 2024–present
- Gordon McMaster, Paisley South, 1990–1997
- Kirsty McNeill, Midlothian, 2024–present
- Tony McWalter, Hemel Hempstead, 1997–2005
- Sir Frederick Messer, Tottenham South, 1935–1950; Tottenham, 1950–1959 (previously Labour MP for Tottenham South, 1929–1931)
- Alun Michael, Cardiff South and Penarth, 1987–2012
- Lewis Moonie, Kirkcaldy, 1987–2005
- Alf Morris, Manchester Wythenshawe, 1964–1997
- Robert Craigmyle Morrison, Tottenham North, 1922–1931; 1935–1950
- Meg Munn, Sheffield Heeley, 2001–2015
- James Murray, Ealing North, 2019–present

=== N ===
- Will Nally, Bilston, 1945–1955
- Doug Naysmith, Bristol North West, 1997–2010
- Stan Newens, Epping, 1974–1970; Harlow, 1974–1983
- Alex Norris, Nottingham North, 2017–2024; Nottingham North and Kimberley, 2024–present

=== O ===
- Ossie O'Brien, Darlington, March–June 1983
- Albert Edward Oram, East Ham South, 1955–1974
- Kate Osamor, Edmonton, 2017–2024; Edmonton and Winchmore Hill, 2024–present
- Will Owen, Morpeth, 1954–1970

=== P ===
- Andrew Pakes, Peterborough, 2024–present
- Arthur Palmer, Wimbledon, 1945–1950; Cleveland, 1952–1959; Bristol Central, 1964–1974
- Laurence Pavitt, Willesden West, 1959–1974; Brent South, 1974–1987
- Samuel Perry, Kettering, 1923–1924; 1929–1931
- Jo Platt, Leigh, 2017–2019; Leigh and Atherton, 2024–present
- Luke Pollard, Plymouth Sutton and Devonport, 2017–present
- Lucy Powell, Manchester Central, 2012–present
- Ken Purchase, Wolverhampton North East, 1992–2010

=== R ===
- John Rankin, Glasgow Tradeston, 1945–1955; Glasgow Govan, 1955–1973
- Andy Reed, Loughborough, 1997–2010
- Steve Reed, Croydon North, 2012–2024; Streatham and Croydon North, 2024–present
- Christina Rees, Neath, 2016–2024 (previously Labour for the same seat, 2015–2016)
- Jonathan Reynolds, Stalybridge and Hyde, 2010–present
- Geoffrey Rhodes, Newcastle upon Tyne East, 1964–1974
- Linda Riordan, Halifax, 2005–2015
- Mabel Ridealgh, Ilford North, 1945–1950
- John Roper, Farnworth, 1970–1981 (later sat as SDP, 1981–1983)
- Lloyd Russell-Moyle, Brighton Kemptown, 2017–2024 (suspended on 29 May 2024 the day before dissolution of Parliament)
- Oliver Ryan, Burnley, 2024–present

=== S ===
- Andy Sawford, Corby, 2012–2015
- Baggy Shanker, Derby South, 2024–present
- Barry Sheerman, Huddersfield, 1979–2024
- Gavin Shuker, Luton South, 2010–2019 (later sat as Change UK and as an independent)
- Harriet Slater, Stoke-on-Trent North, 1953–1966
- Angela Smith, Basildon, 1997–2010
- Norman Smith, Nottingham South, 1945–1955
- Gareth Snell, Stoke-on-Trent Central, 2017–2019; 2024–present
- Alex Sobel, Leeds North West, 2017–2024; Leeds Central and Headingley, 2024–present
- John Stonehouse, Wednesbury, 1957–1974; Walsall North, 1974–1976 (from April 1976 for the English National Party)
- Kirsteen Sullivan, Bathgate and Linlithgow, 2024–present
- Paul Sweeney, Glasgow North East, 2017–2019

=== T ===
- David Taylor, North West Leicestershire, 1997–2009
- Gareth Thomas, Harrow West, 2003–present (previously Labour for the same seat, 1997–2003)
- Mike Thomas, Newcastle upon Tyne East, 1974–1981 (1981–1983 for SDP)
- Stanley Tiffany, Peterborough, 1945–1950
- John Tilley, Lambeth Central, 1978–1983
- Meredith Farrar Titterington, Bradford South, 1945–1950
- Don Touhig, Islwyn, 1995–2010
- Anna Turley, Redcar, 2015–2019; 2024–present
- Dennis Turner, Wolverhampton South East, 1987–2005
- Stephen Twigg, Liverpool West Derby, 2010–2019 (previously Labour MP for Enfield Southgate 1997–2005)

=== V ===
- Chris Vince, Harlow, 2024–present

=== W ===
- Alfred Waterson, Kettering, 1918–1922 (elected as Co-operative Party but unilaterally took Labour whip in Parliament, ahead of official Congress decision)
- Paul Waugh, Rochdale, 2024–present
- William Wheeldon, Birmingham Small Heath, 1952–1960
- Sir Thomas Williams, Hammersmith South, 1949–1955; Barons Court, 1955–1959; Warrington, 1961–1981
- Edith Wills, Birmingham Duddeston, 1945–1950
- John Woodcock, Barrow and Furness, 2010–2018 (later sat as independent)
- Rev. George Saville Woods, Finsbury, 1935–1945; Mossley, 1945–1950; Droylsden, 1950–1951
- Ian Wrigglesworth, Thornaby, 1974–1981 (from 1981 for SDP)

=== Y ===
- Andrew Young, Glasgow Partick, 1923–1924

== See also ==
- List of Labour Party MPs
- Labour and Co-operative Party
- Labour Party
- Co-operative Party

== Bibliography ==
- Carr, H., Pyper, H. & Erbmann, R., Labour Values, Co-operative Action: a Tale of Two Parties, The Co-operative Party, 2006
