= List of Labour Party (UK) MPs =

This is a list of British Labour Party MPs. It includes all members of Parliament (MPs) elected to the House of Commons representing the Labour Party from 1900 to 1923 and since 1992. Members of the Scottish Parliament, the Senedd or the European Parliament are not listed. Those in italics are overall leaders of the Labour Party, those in bold are prime ministers.

== List of MPs ==
=== A ===
- Diane Abbott, Hackney North and Stoke Newington, 1987–present
- Jack Abbott, Ipswich, 2024–present
- Sagal Abdi-Wali, Holborn and St Pancras, 2026-present
- William Abraham, Rhondda, 1910–18; Rhondda West, 1918–20
- Debbie Abrahams, Oldham East and Saddleworth, 2011–present
- Leo Abse, Pontypool, 1958–83; Torfaen, 1983–87
- Richard Acland, Gravesend, 1947–55
- Allen Adams, Paisley, 1979–83; Paisley North, 1983–90
- David Adams, Newcastle upon Tyne West, 1922–23; Consett, 1935–43
- Irene Adams, Paisley North, 1990–2005
- Richard Adams, Balham and Tooting, 1945–50; Wandsworth Central, 1950–55
- Jennie Adamson, Dartford, 1938–45; Bexley, 1945–46
- William Adamson, West Fife, 1910–31
- William Murdoch Adamson, Cannock, 1922–31; 1935–45
- Christopher Addison, Swindon, 1929–31; 1934–35
- Zubir Ahmed, Glasgow South West, 2024–present
- Nick Ainger, Pembroke, 1992–97; Carmarthen West and South Pembrokeshire, 1997–2010
- William Ainsley, North West Durham, 1955–64
- Bob Ainsworth, Coventry North East, 1992–2015
- Craigie Aitchison, Kilmarnock, 1929–31
- Luke Akehurst, North Durham, 2024–present
- Sadik Al-Hassan, North Somerset, 2024–present
- Bayo Alaba, Southend East and Rochford, 2024–present
- Austen Albu, Edmonton, 1948–74
- Percy Alden, Tottenham South, 1923–24
- Dan Aldridge, Weston-super-Mare, 2024–present
- A. V. Alexander, Sheffield Hillsborough, 1927–31; 1935–50
- Douglas Alexander, Paisley South, 1997–2005; Paisley and South Renfrewshire, 2005–15; Lothian East, 2024–present
- Heidi Alexander, Lewisham East, 2010–18; Swindon South, 2024–present
- Rushanara Ali, Bethnal Green and Bow, 2010–24; Bethnal Green and Stepney, 2024–present
- Tahir Ali, Birmingham Hall Green, 2019–24; Birmingham Hall Green and Moseley, 2024–present
- Frank Allaun, Salford East, 1955–83
- Walter Alldritt, Liverpool Scotland, 1964–71
- Arthur Allen, Bosworth, 1945–59
- Graham Allen, Nottingham North, 1987–2017
- Scholefield Allen, Crewe, 1945–74
- Garry Allighan, Gravesend, 1945–47
- Rosena Allin-Khan, Tooting, 2016–present
- Joseph Alpass, Bristol Central, 1929–31; Thornbury, 1945–50
- Mike Amesbury, Weaver Vale, 2017–24; Runcorn and Helsby, 2024–2025
- Charles Ammon, Camberwell North, 1922–31; 1935–44
- Alexander Anderson, Motherwell, 1945–54
- Callum Anderson, Buckingham and Bletchley, 2024–present
- David Anderson, Blaydon, 2005–17
- Donald Anderson, Monmouth, 1966–70; Swansea East, 1974–2005
- Fleur Anderson, Putney, 2019–present
- Frank Anderson, Whitehaven, 1935–59
- Janet Anderson, Rossendale and Darwen, 1992–2010
- William Crawford Anderson, Sheffield Attercliffe, 1914–18
- Norman Angell, Bradford North, 1929–31
- Tonia Antoniazzi, Gower, 2017–present
- Peter Archer, Rowley Regis and Tipton, 1966–74; Warley West, 1974–92
- Ernest Armstrong, North West Durham, 1964–87
- Hilary Armstrong, North West Durham, 1987–2010
- Scott Arthur, Edinburgh South West, 2024–present
- Jess Asato, Lowestoft, 2024–present
- Jack Ashley, Baron Ashley of Stoke, Stoke-on-Trent South, 1966–92
- Joe Ashton, Bassetlaw, 1968–2001
- Jonathan Ashworth, Leicester South, 2011–24
- James Asser, West Ham and Beckton, 2024–present
- Candy Atherton, Falmouth and Camborne, 1997–2005
- Jas Athwal, Ilford South, 2024–present
- Charlotte Atkins, Staffordshire Moorlands, 1997–2010
- Ronald Atkins, Preston North, 1966–70; 1974–79
- Catherine Atkinson, Derby North, 2024–present
- Lewis Atkinson, Sunderland Central, 2024–present
- Norman Atkinson, Tottenham, 1964–87
- **Clement Attlee**, Limehouse, 1922–50; Walthamstow West, 1950–56
- Herschel Austin, Stretford, 1945–50
- Ian Austin, Dudley North, 2005–19
- John Austin, Woolwich, 1992–97; Erith and Thamesmead, 1997–2010
- Stan Awbery, Bristol Central, 1945–64
- Walter Ayles, Bristol North, 1923–24; 1929–31; Southall, 1945–50; Hayes and Harlington, 1950–53
- Barbara Ayrton-Gould, Hendon North, 1945–50

=== B ===
- Alice Bacon, Leeds North East, 1945–55; Leeds South East, 1955–70
- Gordon Bagier, Sunderland South, 1964–87
- Adrian Bailey, West Bromwich West, 2000–19
- Calvin Bailey, Leyton and Wanstead, 2024–present
- Olivia Bailey, Reading West and Mid Berkshire, 2024–present
- Willie Bain, Glasgow North East, 2009–15
- David Baines, St Helens North, 2024–present
- John Baird, Wolverhampton East, 1945–50; Wolverhampton North East, 1950–64
- Vera Baird, Redcar, 2001–10
- Alex Baker, Aldershot, 2024–present
- John Baker, Bilston, 1924–31
- Richard Baker, Glenrothes and Mid Fife, 2024–present
- Walter John Baker, Bristol East, 1923–31
- Oliver Baldwin, Dudley, 1929–31; Paisley, 1945–47
- Alfred Balfour, West Stirlingshire, 1945–59
- Alex Ballinger, Halesowen, 2024–present
- Ed Balls, Normanton, 2005–10; Morley and Outwood, 2010–15
- Antonia Bance, Tipton and Wednesbury, 2024–present
- William Banfield, Wednesbury, 1932–45
- Gordon Banks, Ochil and South Perthshire, 2005–15
- Tony Banks, Newham North West, 1986–97; West Ham, 1997–2005
- George Banton, Leicester East, 1922; 1923–24
- George Barker, Abertillery, 1920–29
- Paula Barker, Liverpool Wavertree, 2019–present
- Celia Barlow, Hove, 2005–10
- Alfred Barnes, East Ham South, 1922–31; 1935–55
- George Nicoll Barnes, Glasgow Blackfriars and Hutchesontown, 1906–18, Glasgow Gorbals, 1918
- Harry Barnes, North East Derbyshire, 1987–2005
- Michael Barnes, Brentford and Chiswick, 1966–74
- Guy Barnett, South Dorset, 1962–64; Greenwich, 1971–86
- Joel Barnett, Heywood and Royton, 1964–83
- James Barr, Motherwell, 1924–31; Coatbridge, 1935–45
- Kevin Barron, Rother Valley, 1983–2019
- Lee Barron, Corby and East Northamptonshire, 2024–present
- Alex Barros-Curtis, Cardiff West, 2024–present
- Percy Barstow, Pontefract, 1941–50
- Patrick Bartley, Chester-le-Street, 1950–56
- Alfred Bates, Bebington and Ellesmere Port, 1974–79
- Joseph Batey, Spennymoor, 1922–42
- John Battle, Leeds West, 1987–2010
- John Battley, Clapham, 1945–50
- Johanna Baxter, Paisley and Renfrewshire South, 2024–present
- William Baxter, West Stirlingshire, 1959–74
- Hugh Bayley, City of York, 1992–2010; York Central, 2010–15
- Danny Beales, Uxbridge and South Ruislip, 2024–present
- Robert Bean, Rochester and Chatham, 1974–79
- Alan Beaney, Hemsworth, 1959–74
- Nigel Beard, Bexleyheath and Crayford, 1997–2005
- Hubert Beaumont, Batley and Morley, 1939–48
- Lorraine Beavers, Blackpool North and Fleetwood, 2024–present
- John Beckett, Gateshead, 1924–29; Peckham, 1929–31
- Margaret Beckett, Lincoln, 1974–79; Derby South, 1983–2024
- Anne Begg, Aberdeen South, 1997–2015
- Apsana Begum, Poplar and Limehouse, 2019–present
- James Bell, Ormskirk, 1918–22
- Joseph Nicholas Bell, Newcastle upon Tyne East, 1922–23
- Richard Bell, Derby, 1900–04
- Stuart Bell, Middlesbrough, 1983–2012
- Torsten Bell, Swansea West, 2024–present
- Hilary Benn, Leeds Central, 1999–2024; Leeds South, 2024–present
- Tony Benn, Bristol South East, 1950–61; 1963–83; Chesterfield, 1984–2001
- Andrew Bennett, Stockport South, 1974–1983; Denton and Reddish, 1983–2005
- Joe Benton, Bootle, 1990–2015
- Luciana Berger, Liverpool Riverside, 2010–19
- Gerry Bermingham, St Helens South, 1983–2001
- Roger Berry, Kingswood, 1992–2010
- Harold Best, Leeds North West, 1997–2005
- Frank Beswick, Uxbridge, 1945–59
- Clive Betts, Sheffield Attercliffe, 1992–2010; Sheffield South East, 2010–present
- Aneurin Bevan, Ebbw Vale, 1929–60
- Polly Billington, East Thanet, 2024–present
- Matt Bishop, Forest of Dean, 2024–present
- Liz Blackman, Erewash, 1997–2010
- Roberta Blackman-Woods, City of Durham, 2005–19
- **Tony Blair**, Sedgefield, 1983–2007
- Olivia Blake, Sheffield Hallam, 2019–present
- Rachel Blake, Cities of London and Westminster, 2024–present
- Hazel Blears, Salford, 1997–2010; Salford and Eccles, 2010–15
- Tom Blenkinsop, Middlesbrough South and East Cleveland, 2010–17
- Bob Blizzard, Waveney, 1997–2010
- Paul Blomfield, Sheffield Central, 2010–24
- Chris Bloore, Redditch, 2024–present
- Elsie Blundell, Heywood and Middleton North, 2024–present
- David Blunkett, Sheffield Brightside, 1987–2010; Sheffield Brightside and Hillsborough, 2010–15
- Paul Boateng, Brent South, 1987–2005
- Kevin Bonavia, Stevenage, 2024–present
- Margaret Bondfield, Northampton, 1923–24; Wallsend, 1926–31
- Betty Boothroyd, West Bromwich, 1973–74; West Bromwich West, 1974–92
- David Borrow, South Ribble, 1997–2010
- Jade Botterill, Ossett and Denby Dale, 2024–present
- Herbert Bowden, Leicester South, 1945–50, Leicester South West, 1950–67
- Charles Bowerman, Deptford, 1906–31
- Jimmy Boyce, Rotherham, 1992–94
- Roland Boyes, Houghton and Washington, 1983–97
- Tracy Brabin, Batley and Spen, 2016–21
- William Brace, South Glamorgan, 1910–18; Abertillery, 1918–20
- Sureena Brackenridge, Wolverhampton North East, 2024–present
- Keith Bradley, Manchester Withington, 1987–2005
- Peter Bradley, The Wrekin, 1997–2005
- Ben Bradshaw, Exeter, 1997–2024
- Jonathan Brash, Hartlepool, 2024–present
- Jeremy Bray, Middlesbrough West, 1962–70; Motherwell and Wishaw, 1974–83; Motherwell South, 1983–97
- Kevin Brennan, Cardiff West, 2001–24
- Phil Brickell, Bolton West, 2024–present
- Frank Broad, Edmonton, 1922–31; 1935–45
- William Bromfield, Leek, 1918–31; 1935–45
- John Bromley, Barrow-in-Furness, 1924–31
- John Brotherton, Gateshead, 1922–23
- George Brown, Belper, 1945–70
- **Gordon Brown**, Dunfermline East, 1983–2005; Kirkcaldy and Cowdenbeath, 2005–15
- James Brown, Ayrshire South, 1918–31; 1935–39
- Ron Brown, Edinburgh Leith, 1979–92
- Lyn Brown, West Ham, 2005–24
- Nick Brown, Newcastle upon Tyne East, 1983–97; 2010–22; Newcastle upon Tyne East and Wallsend, 1997–2010
- Russell Brown, Dumfries, 1997–2005; Dumfries and Galloway, 2005–15
- Des Browne, Kilmarnock and Loudoun, 1997–2010
- Chris Bryant, Rhondda, 2001–24; Rhondda and Ogmore, 2024–present
- Norman Buchan, West Renfrewshire, 1964–83; Paisley South 1983–90
- George Buchanan, Glasgow Gorbals, 1922–31; 1939–48
- Karen Buck, Regent's Park and Kensington North, 1997–2010; Westminster North, 2010–24
- John Buckle, Eccles, 1922–24
- George Buckley, Hemsworth, 1987–91
- Julia Buckley, Shrewsbury, 2024–present
- Richard Burden, Birmingham Northfield, 1992–2019
- Stanley Burgess, Rochdale, 1922–23
- Colin Burgon, Elmet, 1997–2010
- Richard Burgon, Leeds East, 2015–present
- Maureen Burke, Glasgow North East, 2024–present
- **Andy Burnham**, Leigh, 2001–17; Makerfield, 2026–present
- Elaine Burton, Coventry South, 1950–59
- David Burton-Sampson, Southend West and Leigh, 2024–present
- Christine Butler, Castle Point, 1997–2001
- Dawn Butler, Brent South, 2005–10; Brent Central, 2015–24; Brent East, 2024–present
- Joyce Butler, Wood Green, 1955–79
- Charles Roden Buxton, Accrington, 1922–23; Elland, 1929–31
- Noel Buxton, North Norfolk, 1922–30
- Stephen Byers, Wallsend, 1992–97; North Tyneside, 1997–2010
- Ian Byrne, Liverpool West Derby, 2019–present
- Liam Byrne, Birmingham Hodge Hill, 2004–24; Birmingham Hodge Hill and Solihull North, 2024–present

=== C ===
- Richard Caborn, Sheffield Central, 1983–2010
- Ruth Cadbury, Brentford and Isleworth, 2015–present
- David Cairns, Greenock and Inverclyde, 2001–05; Inverclyde, 2005–11
- John Cairns, Morpeth, 1918–23
- Nesil Caliskan, Barking, 2024–present
- **James Callaghan**, Cardiff South, 1945–50; Cardiff South East, 1950–83; Cardiff South and Penarth, 1983–87
- James Callaghan, Middleton and Prestwich, 1974–83; Heywood and Middleton, 1983–97
- Alan Campbell, Tynemouth, 1997–present
- Anne Campbell, Cambridge, 1992–2005
- Irene Campbell, North Ayrshire and Arran, 2024–present
- Juliet Campbell, Broxtowe, 2024–present
- Ronnie Campbell, Blyth Valley, 1987–2019
- Dale Campbell-Savours, Workington, 1979–2001
- Markus Campbell-Savours, Penrith and Solway, 2024–present
- Dennis Canavan, West Stirlingshire, 1974–83; Falkirk West, 1983–2000
- Jamie Cann, Ipswich, 1992–2001
- Tom Cape, Workington, 1918–45
- Ivor Caplin, Hove, 1997–2005
- Dan Carden, Liverpool Walton, 2017–present
- Sam Carling, North West Cambridgeshire, 2024–present
- Alistair Carns, Birmingham Selly Oak, 2024–present
- Michael Carr, Bootle, 1990
- Roger Casale, Wimbledon, 1997–2005
- Barbara Castle, Blackburn, 1945–50; 1955–79; Blackburn East, 1950–55
- Martin Caton, Gower, 1997–2015
- William Carter, Mansfield, 1918–22
- Ian Cawsey, Brigg and Goole, 1997–2010
- Colin Challen, Morley and Rothwell, 2001–10
- Arthur Champion, South Derbyshire, 1945–50; South East Derbyshire, 1950–59
- Sarah Champion, Rotherham, 2012–present
- Ben Chapman, Wirral South, 1997–2010
- Jenny Chapman, Darlington, 2010–19
- Bambos Charalambous, Enfield Southgate, 2017–24; Southgate and Wood Green, 2024–present
- Henry Charleton, Leeds South, 1922–31; 1935–45
- Luke Charters, York Outer, 2024–present
- David Chaytor, Bury North, 1997–2010
- Malcolm Chisholm, Edinburgh Leith, 1992–97; Edinburgh North and Leith, 1997–2001
- Archibald Church, Leyton East, 1923–24; Wandsworth Central, 1929–31
- Judith Church, Dagenham, 1994–2001
- Michael Clapham, Barnsley West and Penistone, 1992–2010
- David Clark, Colne Valley, 1970–74; South Shields, 1979–2001
- Feryal Clark, Enfield North, 2019–present
- Helen Clark, Peterborough, 1997–2005
- Katy Clark, North Ayrshire and Arran, 2005–15
- Lynda Clark, Edinburgh Pentlands, 1997–2005
- Paul Clark, Gillingham, 1997–2010
- Andrew Bathgate Clarke, Midlothian and Peebles Northern, 1923–24; 1929
- Charles Clarke, Norwich South, 1997–2010
- Eric Clarke, Midlothian, 1992–2001
- Tom Clarke, Coatbridge and Airdrie, 1982–83; Monklands West, 1983–97; Coatbridge and Chryston, 1997–2005; Coatbridge, Chryston and Bellshill, 2005–15
- Tony Clarke, Northampton South, 1997–2005
- David Clelland, Tyne Bridge, 1985–2010
- Robert Climie, Kilmarnock, 1923–24, 1929
- William Cluse, Islington South, 1923–31; 1935–50
- John Clynes, Manchester North East, 1906–18; Manchester Platting, 1918–31; 1935–45
- Ann Clwyd, Cynon Valley, 1984–2019
- Emma Dent Coad, Kensington, 2017–19
- Vernon Coaker, Gedling, 1997–2019
- Ann Coffey, Stockport, 1992–2019
- Harry Cohen, Leyton, 1983–97; Leyton and Wanstead, 1997–2010
- Ben Coleman, Chelsea and Fulham, 2024–present
- Donald Coleman, Neath, 1964–91
- Iain Coleman, Hammersmith and Fulham, 1997–2005
- Jacob Collier, Burton and Uttoxeter, 2024–present
- Lizzi Collinge, Morecambe and Lonsdale, 2024–present
- Tom Collins, Worcester, 2024–present
- Tony Colman, Putney, 1997–2005
- Joseph Compton, Manchester Gorton, 1923–31; 1935–37
- Liam Conlon, Beckenham and Penge, 2024–present
- Michael Connarty, Falkirk East, 1992–2005; Linlithgow and Falkirk East, 2005–15
- Frank Cook, Stockton North, 1983–2010
- Robin Cook, Edinburgh Central, 1974–83; Livingston, 1983–2005
- Sarah Coombes, West Bromwich, 2024–present
- Andrew Cooper, Mid Cheshire, 2024–present
- Beccy Cooper, Worthing West, 2024–present
- Julie Cooper, Burnley, 2015–19
- Rosie Cooper, West Lancashire, 2005–22
- Yvette Cooper, Pontefract and Castleford, 1997–2010; Normanton, Pontefract and Castleford, 2010–24; Pontefract, Castleford and Knottingley, 2024–present
- Robin Corbett, Hemel Hempstead, 1974–79; Birmingham Erdington, 1983–2001
- Jeremy Corbyn, Islington North, 1983–2024
- Jean Corston, Bristol East, 1992–2005
- Deirdre Costigan, Ealing Southall, 2024–present
- Frank Cousins, Nuneaton, 1965–66
- Jim Cousins, Newcastle upon Tyne Central, 1987–2010
- William Cove, Wellingborough, 1923–29; Aberavon, 1929–59
- Jo Cox, Batley and Spen, 2015–16
- Pam Cox, Colchester, 2024–present
- Tom Cox, Wandsworth Central, 1970–74; Tooting, 1974–2005
- Neil Coyle, Bermondsey and Old Southwark, 2015–present
- Jen Craft, Thurrock, 2024–present
- Ross Cranston, Dudley North, 1997–2005
- David Crausby, Bolton North East, 1997–2019
- Mary Creagh, Wakefield, 2005–19; Coventry East, 2024–present
- Stella Creasy, Walthamstow, 2010–present
- Torcuil Crichton, Na h-Eileanan an Iar, 2024–present
- Valentine Crittall, Maldon, 1923–24
- Will Crooks, Woolwich, 1903–10; 1910–21
- Jon Cruddas, Dagenham, 2001–10; Dagenham and Rainham, 2010–24
- Ann Cryer, Keighley, 1997–2010
- Bob Cryer, Keighley, 1974–83; Bradford South, 1987–94
- John Cryer, Hornchurch, 1997–2005; Leyton and Wanstead, 2010–24
- John Cummings, Easington, 1987–2010
- Judith Cummins, Bradford South, 2015–present
- Lawrence Cunliffe, Leigh, 1979–2001
- Alex Cunningham, Stockton North, 2010–24
- Jack Cunningham, Whitehaven, 1970–83; Copeland, 1983–2005
- Jim Cunningham, Coventry South East, 1992–97; Coventry South, 1997–2019
- Tony Cunningham, Workington, 2001–15
- Margaret Curran, Glasgow East, 2010–15
- Peter Curran, Jarrow, 1906–10
- Claire Curtis-Thomas, Crosby, 1997–2010
- Chris Curtis, Milton Keynes North, 2024–present

=== D ===
- Janet Daby, Lewisham East, 2018–present
- Paul Daisley, Brent East, 2001–03
- Nic Dakin, Scunthorpe, 2010–19; 2024–present
- Ashley Dalton, West Lancashire, 2023–present
- Tam Dalyell, West Lothian, 1962–83; Linlithgow, 1983–2005
- Simon Danczuk, Rochdale, 2010–15
- Alistair Darling, Edinburgh Central, 1987–2005; Edinburgh South West, 2005–15
- Emily Darlington, Milton Keynes Central, 2024–present
- Keith Darvill, Upminster, 1997–2001
- Valerie Davey, Bristol West, 1997–2005
- Wayne David, Caerphilly, 2001–24
- Ian Davidson, Glasgow Govan, 1992–97; Glasgow Pollok, 1997–2005; Glasgow South West, 2005–15
- Alfred Davies, Clitheroe, 1918–22
- Bryan Davies, Enfield North, 1974–79; Oldham Central and Royton, 1992–97
- Denzil Davies, Llanelli, 1970–2005
- Evan Davies, Ebbw Vale, 1920–29
- Geraint Davies, Croydon Central, 1997–2005; Swansea West, 2010–23
- Jonathan Davies, Mid Derbyshire, 2024–present
- Paul Davies, Colne Valley, 2024–present
- Quentin Davies, Grantham and Stamford, 2007–10
- Rhys Davies, Westhoughton, 1921–51
- Ron Davies, Caerphilly, 1983–2001
- Shaun Davies, Telford, 2024–present
- Alex Davies-Jones, Pontypridd, 2019–present
- Terry Davis, Bromsgrove, 1971–74; Birmingham Stechford, 1979–83; Birmingham Hodge Hill, 1983–2004
- John Emanuel Davison, Smethwick, 1918–26
- Hilton Dawson, Lancaster and Wyre, 1997–2005
- Marsha de Cordova, Battersea, 2017–present
- Gloria De Piero, Ashfield, 2010–19
- Janet Dean, Burton, 1997–2010
- Josh Dean, Hertford and Stortford, 2024–present
- Kate Dearden, Halifax, 2024–present
- Thangam Debbonaire, Bristol West, 2015–24
- George Deer, Lincoln, 1945–50; Newark, 1950–64
- John Denham, Southampton Itchen, 1992–2015
- Robert Dennison, Birmingham King's Norton, 1924–29
- Jim Devine, Livingston, 2005–10
- Donald Dewar, Aberdeen South, 1966–70; Glasgow Garscadden, 1978–97; Glasgow Anniesland, 1997–2000
- Parmjit Dhanda, Gloucester, 2001–10
- Tan Dhesi, Slough, 2017–present
- Jim Dickson, Dartford, 2024–present
- Thomas Scott Dickson, Lanark, 1923–24; 1929–31
- Andrew Dismore, Hendon, 1997–2010
- Anna Dixon, Shipley, 2024–present
- Samantha Dixon, City of Chester, 2022–24; Chester North and Neston, 2024–present
- Jim Dobbin, Heywood and Middleton, 1997–2014
- Frank Dobson, Holborn and St Pancras South, 1979–83; Holborn and St Pancras, 1983–2015
- Thomas Docherty, Dunfermline and West Fife, 2010–15
- Anneliese Dodds, Oxford East, 2017–present
- Helena Dollimore, Hastings and Rye, 2024–present
- Brian Donohoe, Cunninghame South, 1992–2005; Central Ayrshire, 2005–15
- Frank Doran, Aberdeen South, 1987–97; Aberdeen Central, 1997–2005; Aberdeen North, 2005–15
- Stephen Doughty, Cardiff South and Penarth, 2012–present
- Jim Dowd, Lewisham West, 1992–2010; Lewisham West and Penge, 2010–17
- Peter Dowd, Bootle, 2015–present
- Graeme Downie, Dunfermline and Dollar, 2024–present
- Gemma Doyle, West Dunbartonshire, 2010–15
- David Drew, Stroud, 1997–2010; 2017–19
- Jack Dromey, Birmingham Erdington, 2010–22
- Julia Drown, Swindon South, 1997–2005
- Rosie Duffield, Canterbury, 2017–present
- Thomas Gavan-Duffy, Whitehaven, 1922–24
- Michael Dugher, Barnsley East, 2010–17
- Charles Dukes, Warrington, 1923–24; 1929–31
- Charles Duncan, Barrow, 1906–18; Clay Cross, 1922–1933
- Neil Duncan-Jordan, Poole, 2024–present
- Jimmy Dunnachie, Glasgow Pollok, 1987–97
- Herbert Dunnico, Consett, 1922–31
- Gwyneth Dunwoody, Exeter, 1966–70; Crewe, 1974–83; Crewe and Nantwich, 1983–2008

=== E ===
- Angela Eagle, Wallasey, 1992–present
- Maria Eagle, Liverpool Garston, 1997–2010; 2024–present; Garston and Halewood, 2010–24
- Cat Eccles, Stourbridge, 2024–present
- James Chuter Ede, Mitcham, 1923; South Shields, 1929–31; 1935–64
- Charles Edwards, Bedwellty, 1918–50
- Enoch Edwards, Hanley, 1910–12
- George Edwards, South Norfolk, 1919–22; 1923–24
- Huw Edwards, Monmouth, 1991–92; 1997–2005
- Lauren Edwards, Rochester and Strood, 2024–present
- Sarah Edwards, Tamworth, 2023–present
- Clive Efford, Eltham, 1997–2024; Eltham and Chislehurst, 2024–present
- Damien Egan, Kingswood, 2024; Bristol North East, 2024–present
- William Henry Egan, Birkenhead West, 1923–24; 1929–31
- Julie Elliott, Sunderland Central, 2010–24
- Maya Ellis, Ribble Valley, 2024–present
- Louise Ellman, Liverpool Riverside, 1997–2019
- Chris Elmore, Ogmore, 2016–24; Bridgend, 2024–present
- Natalie Elphicke, Dover, 2024
- Natascha Engel, North East Derbyshire, 2005–17
- Jeffrey Ennis, Barnsley East, 1996–97; Barnsley East and Mexborough, 1996–2010
- Derek Enright, Hemsworth, 1991–95
- Kirith Entwistle, Bolton North East, 2024–present
- Florence Eshalomi, Vauxhall, 2019–24; Vauxhall and Camberwell Green, 2024–present
- Bill Esterson, Sefton Central, 2010–present
- Bill Etherington, Sunderland North, 1992–2010
- Chris Evans, Islwyn, 2010–24; Caerphilly, 2024–present
- Ioan Evans, Birmingham Yardley, 1964–70; Aberdare, 1974–83; Cynon Valley, 1983–84

=== F ===
- Miatta Fahnbulleh, Peckham, 2024–present
- Hamish Falconer, Lincoln, 2024–present
- Linsey Farnsworth, Amber Valley, 2024–present
- Paul Farrelly, Newcastle-under-Lyme, 2001–19
- Walter Farthing, Frome, 1945–50
- Derek Fatchett, Leeds Central, 1983–99
- Josh Fenton-Glynn, Calder Valley, 2024–present
- Mark Ferguson, Gateshead Central and Whickham, 2024–present
- Patricia Ferguson, Glasgow West, 2024–present
- Frank Field, Birkenhead, 1979–2018
- Samuel Finney, North West Staffordshire, 1916–18; Stoke-on-Trent Burslem, 1918–22
- Mark Fisher, Stoke-on-Trent Central, 1983–2010
- Jim Fitzpatrick, Poplar and Canning Town, 1997–2010; Poplar and Limehouse, 2010–19
- Lorna Fitzsimons, Rochdale, 1997–2005
- Natalie Fleet, Bolsover, 2024–present
- Rob Flello, Stoke-on-Trent South, 2005–17
- Colleen Fletcher, Coventry North East, 2015–24
- Caroline Flint, Don Valley, 1997–2019
- Paul Flynn, Newport West, 1987–2019
- Barbara Follett, Stevenage, 1997–2010
- Emma Foody, Cramlington and Killingworth, 2024–present
- Catherine Fookes, Monmouthshire, 2024–present
- Dingle Foot, Ipswich, 1957–70
- Michael Foot, Plymouth Devonport, 1945–55; Ebbw Vale, 1960–83; Blaenau Gwent, 1983–92
- Lisa Forbes, Peterborough, June–November 2019
- Derek Foster, Bishop Auckland, 1979–2005
- Michael Jabez Foster, Hastings and Rye, 1997–2010
- Michael John Foster, Worcester, 1997–2010
- Paul Foster, South Ribble, 2024–present
- George Foulkes, South Ayrshire, 1979–83; Carrick, Cumnock and Doon Valley, 1983–2005
- Yvonne Fovargue, Makerfield, 2010–24
- Vicky Foxcroft, Lewisham Deptford, 2015–24; Lewisham North, 2024–present
- Mary Foy, City of Durham, 2019–present
- Daniel Francis, Bexleyheath and Crayford, 2024–present
- Hywel Francis, Aberavon, 2001–15
- James Frith, Bury North, 2017–19; 2024–present
- Gill Furniss, Sheffield Brightside and Hillsborough, 2016–present
- Maria Fyfe, Glasgow Maryhill, 1987–2001

=== G ===
- Hugh Gaffney, Coatbridge, Chryston and Bellshill, 2017–19
- Hugh Gaitskell, Leeds South, 1945–63
- Sam Galbraith, Strathkelvin and Bearsden, 1987–2001
- George Galloway, Glasgow Hillhead, 1987–97; Glasgow Kelvin, 1997–2003
- Mike Gapes, Ilford South, 1992–2019
- Barry Gardiner, Brent North, 1997–2024; Brent West, 2024–present
- Benjamin Gardiner, Upton, 1923–24; 1929–31; 1934–45
- Allison Gardner, Stoke-on-Trent South, 2024–present
- James Patrick Gardner, Hammersmith North, 1923–24; 1926–31
- Alex Garrow, Glasgow Pollok, 1964–67
- Anna Gelderd, South East Cornwall, 2024–present
- Alan Gemmell, Central Ayrshire, 2024–present
- Bruce George, Walsall South, Feb 1974–2010
- Ruth George, High Peak, 2017–19
- Gill German, Clwyd North, 2024–present
- Neil Gerrard, Walthamstow, 1992–2010
- Joseph Gibbins, Liverpool West Derby, 1924–31; 1935–50
- Ian Gibson, Norwich North, 1997–2009
- Tracy Gilbert, Edinburgh North And Leith, 2024–present
- Alfred Henry Gill, Bolton, 1906–14
- Preet Kaur Gill, Birmingham Edgbaston, 2017–present
- George Masterman Gillett, Finsbury, 1923–31
- William Gillis, Penistone, 1921–22
- Sheila Gilmore, Edinburgh East, 2010–15
- Linda Gilroy, Plymouth Sutton, 1997–2010
- Becky Gittins, Clwyd East, 2024–present
- Pat Glass, North West Durham, 2010–17
- Mary Glindon, North Tyneside, 2010–24; Newcastle upon Tyne East and Wallsend, 2024–present
- Thomas Glover, St Helens, 1906–10
- Norman Godman, Greenock and Port Glasgow, 1983–97; Greenock and Inverclyde, 1997–2001
- Roger Godsiff, Birmingham Small Heath, 1992–97; Birmingham Sparkbrook and Small Heath, 1997–2010; Birmingham Hall Green, 2010–19
- Paul Goggins, Wythenshawe and Sale East, 1997–2014
- Llin Golding, Newcastle-under-Lyme, 1986–2001
- Ben Goldsborough, South Norfolk, 2024–present
- Frank Goldstone, Sunderland, 1910–18
- Helen Goodman, Bishop Auckland, 2005–19
- Eileen Gordon, Romford, 1997–2001
- Harry Gosling, Whitechapel and St George's, 1923–30
- Jodie Gosling, Nuneaton, 2024–present
- Archibald Gossling, Birmingham Yardley, 1929–31
- Bryan Gould, Southampton Test, 1974–79; Dagenham, 1983–94
- Frederick Gould, Frome, 1923–24; 1929–31
- Georgia Gould, Queen's Park and Maida Vale, 2024–present
- John Grady, Glasgow East, 2024–present
- Duncan Macgregor Graham, Hamilton, 1918–43
- Robinson Graham, Nelson and Colne, 1920–22
- Tommy Graham, Renfrew West and Inverclyde, 1987–97; Renfrewshire West, 1997–98
- William Graham, Edinburgh Central, 1918–31
- Bernie Grant, Tottenham, 1987–2000
- Tom Greatrex, Rutherglen and Hamilton West, 2010–15
- Kate Green, Stretford and Urmston, 2010–22
- Thomas Greenall, Farnworth, 1922–29
- Arthur Greenwood, Nelson and Colne, 1922–31; Wakefield, 1932–51
- Lilian Greenwood, Nottingham South, 2010–present
- Margaret Greenwood, Wirral West, 2015–24
- David Grenfell, Gower, 1922–59
- Nia Griffith, Llanelli, 2005–present
- Jane Griffiths, Reading East, 1997–2005
- Nigel Griffiths, Edinburgh South, 1987–2010
- Thomas Griffiths, Pontypool, 1918–35
- Win Griffiths, Bridgend, 1987–2005
- Bruce Grocott, Lichfield and Tamworth, 1974–79; The Wrekin, 1987–97; Telford, 1997–2001
- John Grogan, Selby, 1997–2010; Keighley, 2017–19
- Tom Groves, Stratford West Ham, 1922–45
- Thomas Walter Grundy, Rother Valley, 1918–35
- John Guest, Hemsworth, 1918–31
- John Gunnell, Morley and Leeds South, 1992–97; Morley and Rothwell, 1997–2001
- Andrew Gwynne, Denton and Reddish, 2005–24; Gorton and Denton, 2024–present

=== H ===
- Amanda Hack, North West Leicestershire, 2024–present
- Leslie Haden-Guest, Southwark North, 1923–27; Islington North, 1938–50
- Louise Haigh, Sheffield Heeley, 2015–present
- Peter Hain, Neath, 1991–2015
- Frederick Hall, Normanton, 1910–33
- George Hall, Aberdare, 1922–46
- Mike Hall, Warrington South, 1992–97; Weaver Vale, 1997–2010
- Patrick Hall, Bedford, 1997–2010
- Sarah Hall, Warrington South, 2024–present
- Walter Halls, Heywood and Radcliffe, 1921–23
- David Hamilton, Midlothian, 2001–15
- Fabian Hamilton, Leeds North East, 1997–present
- Paulette Hamilton, Birmingham Erdington, 2022–present
- John Hancock, Mid Derbyshire, 1910–15
- David Hanson, Delyn, 1992–2019
- George Hardie, Glasgow Springburn, 1922–31; 1935–37
- Keir Hardie, Merthyr Tydfil, 1900–15
- Emma Hardy, Kingston upon Hull West and Hessle, 2017–24; Kingston upon Hull West and Haltemprice, 2024–present
- Harriet Harman, Peckham, 1982–97; Camberwell and Peckham, 1997–2024
- Harry Harpham, Sheffield Brightside and Hillsborough, 2015–16
- Carolyn Harris, Swansea East, 2015–24; Neath and Swansea East, 2024–present
- Tom Harris, Glasgow Cathcart, 2001–05; Glasgow South, 2005–15
- Vernon Hartshorn, Ogmore, 1918–31
- Dai Havard, Merthyr Tydfil and Rhymney, 2001–15
- W. E. Harvey, North East Derbyshire, 1910–14
- James Haslam, Chesterfield, 1910–13
- Somerville Hastings, Reading, 1923–24; 1929–31; Barking, 1945–59
- Patrick Hastings, Wallsend, 1922–26
- Lloyd Hatton, South Dorset, 2024–present
- John Primrose Hay, Glasgow Cathcart, 1922–23
- Alexander Haycock, Salford West, 1923–24; 1929–31
- Helen Hayes, Dulwich and West Norwood, 2015–present
- Jack Hayes, Liverpool Edge Hill, 1923–31
- Tom Hayes, Bournemouth East, 2024–present
- Sue Hayman, Workington, 2015–19
- Arthur Hayday, Nottingham West, 1918–31; 1935–45
- Claire Hazelgrove, Filton and Bradley Stoke, 2024–present
- Sylvia Heal, Mid Staffordshire, 1990–92; Halesowen and Rowley Regis, 1997–2010
- John Healey, Wentworth, 1997–2010; Wentworth and Dearne, 2010–24; Rawmarsh and Conisbrough, 2024–present
- Eric Heffer, Liverpool Walton, 1964–91
- Edward Hemmerde, Crewe, 1922–24
- Arthur Henderson, Barnard Castle, 1903–18; Widnes, 1919–22; Newcastle East, 1922–23; Burnley, 1923–31; Clay Cross, 1933–35
- Arthur Henderson, Baron Rowley, Cardiff South, 1923–24; 1929–31; Kingswinford, 1935–50; Rowley Regis and Tipton, 1950–66
- Doug Henderson, Newcastle upon Tyne North, 1987–2010
- Ivan Henderson, Harwich, 1997–2005
- Thomas Henderson, Glasgow Tradeston, 1927–31; 1935–45
- William Henderson, Enfield, 1923–24; 1929–31
- Sir Mark Hendrick, Preston, 2000–present
- Stephen Hepburn, Jarrow, 1997–2019
- John Heppell, Nottingham East, 1992–2010
- John Herriotts, Sedgefield, 1922–23; 1929–31
- Stephen Hesford, Wirral West, 1997–2010
- Patricia Hewitt, Leicester West, 1997–2010
- David Heyes, Ashton-under-Lyne, 2001–15
- Alfred Hill, Leicester West, 1922–23
- Keith Hill, Streatham, 1992–2010
- Mike Hill, Hartlepool, 2017–21
- Meg Hillier, Hackney South and Shoreditch, 2005–present
- Julie Hilling, Bolton West, 2010–15
- Chris Hinchliff, North East Hertfordshire, 2024–present
- David Hinchliffe, Wakefield, 1987–2005
- Jonathan Hinder, Pendle and Clitheroe, 2024–present
- George Harry Hirst, Wentworth, 1918–33
- John Hodge, Manchester Gorton, 1906–16
- Margaret Hodge, Barking, 1994–2024
- Frank Hodges, Lichfield, 1923–24
- Sharon Hodgson, Gateshead East and Washington West, 2005–10; Washington and Sunderland West, 2010–24; Washington and Gateshead South, 2024–present
- Kate Hoey, Vauxhall, 1989–2019
- Philip Hoffman, South East Essex, 1923–24; Sheffield Central, 1929–31
- Alfred Holland, Clay Cross, 1935–36
- Stuart Holland, Vauxhall, 1979–89
- Kate Hollern, Blackburn, 2015–24
- Jimmy Hood, Clydesdale, 1987–2005; Lanark and Hamilton East, 2005–15
- Geoff Hoon, Ashfield, 1992–2010
- Phil Hope, Corby, 1997–2010
- Kelvin Hopkins, Luton North, 1997–2017
- Rachel Hopkins, Luton South, 2019–24; Luton South and South Bedfordshire, 2024–present
- Alan Howarth, Stratford-on-Avon, 1995–97; Newport East, 1997–2005
- George Howarth, Knowsley North, 1986–97; Knowsley North and Sefton East, 1997–2010; Knowsley, 2010–24
- Kim Howells, Pontypridd, 1989–2010
- Dennis Howell, Birmingham All Saints, 1955–59; Birmingham Small Heath, 1961–92
- Lindsay Hoyle, Chorley, 1997–2019
- Les Huckfield, Nuneaton, 1967–83
- James Hudson, Huddersfield, 1923–31; Ealing West, 1945–50; Ealing North, 1950–55
- Walter Hudson, Newcastle-upon-Tyne, 1906–18
- Beverley Hughes, Stretford and Urmston, 1997–2010
- Claire Hughes, Bangor Aberconwy, 2024–present
- Kevin Hughes, Doncaster North, 1992–2005
- Sean Hughes, Knowsley South, 1983–90
- Joan Humble, Blackpool North and Fleetwood, 1997–2010
- Alison Hume, Scarborough and Whitby, 2024–present
- Tristram Hunt, Stoke-on-Trent Central, 2010–17
- Rupa Huq, Ealing Central and Acton, 2015–present
- Alan Hurst, Braintree, 1997–2005
- Patrick Hurley, Southport, 2024–present
- Imran Hussain, Bradford East, 2015–present
- John Hutton, Barrow and Furness, 1992–2010

=== I ===
- Brian Iddon, Bolton South East, 1997–2010
- Eric Illsley, Barnsley Central, 1987–2010
- Leigh Ingham, Stafford, 2024–present
- Adam Ingram, East Kilbride, 1987–2005; East Kilbride, Strathaven and Lesmahagow, 2005–10
- Natasha Irons, Croydon East, 2024–present
- Huw Irranca-Davies, Ogmore, 2002–16
- Arthur Irvine, Liverpool Edge Hill, 1947–79
- Dan Irving, Burnley, 1918–24
- Sydney Irving, Dartford, 1955–70; 1974–79
- William Irving, Tottenham North, 1945–50; Wood Green, 1950–55
- George Isaacs, Gravesend, 1923–24; Southwark North, 1929–31; 1939–50; Southwark, 1950–59

=== J ===
- Glenda Jackson, Hampstead and Highgate, 1992–2010; Hampstead and Kilburn, 2010–15
- Helen Jackson, Sheffield Hillsborough, 1992–2005
- Robert Jackson, Ipswich, 1923–24
- Robert V. Jackson, Wantage, 2005
- Cathy Jamieson, Kilmarnock and Loudoun, 2010–15
- David Jamieson, Plymouth Devonport, 1992–2005
- Siân James, Swansea East, 2005–2015
- Sally Jameson, Doncaster Central, 2024–present
- Dan Jarvis, Barnsley Central, 2011–24; Barnsley North, 2024–present
- Brian Jenkins, South East Staffordshire, 1996–97; Tamworth, 1997–2010
- John Jenkins, Chatham, 1906–10
- William Jenkins, Neath, 1922–44
- Terry Jermy, South West Norfolk, 2024–present
- Dorothy Jewson, Norwich, 1923–24
- Adam Jogee, Newcastle-under-Lyme, 2024–present
- Brynmor John, Pontypridd, 1970–88
- William John, Rhondda West, 1920–50
- Alan Johnson, Kingston upon Hull West and Hessle, 1997–2017
- Diana Johnson, Kingston upon Hull North, 2005–24; Kingston upon Hull North and Cottingham, 2024–present
- Kim Johnson, Liverpool Riverside, 2019–present
- Melanie Johnson, Welwyn Hatfield, 1997–2005
- William Johnson, Nuneaton, 1910–18
- Thomas Johnston, Stirling and Clackmannan West, 1922–24; 1929–31; 1935–45; Dundee, 1924–29
- Arthur Creech Jones, Shipley 1935–50; Wakefield, 1954–64
- Barry Jones, East Flintshire, 1979–83; Alyn and Deeside, 1983–2001
- Darren Jones, Bristol North West, 2017–present
- Fiona Jones, Newark, 1997–2001
- Gerald Jones, Merthyr Tydfil and Rhymney, 2015–24; Merthyr Tydfil and Aberdare, 2024–present
- Graham Jones, Hyndburn, 2010–19
- Helen Jones, Warrington North, 1997–2019
- Jenny Jones, Wolverhampton South West, 1997–2001
- John Joseph Jones, Silvertown, 1919–40
- Jon Owen Jones, Cardiff Central, 1992–2005
- Kevan Jones, North Durham, 2001–24
- Lillian Jones, Kilmarnock and Loudoun, 2024–present
- Lynne Jones, Birmingham Selly Oak, 1992–2010
- Martyn Jones, Clwyd South West, 1987–97; Clwyd South, 1997–2010
- Morgan Jones, Caerphilly, 1921–39
- Robert Thomas Jones, Caernarvonshire, 1922–23
- Ruth Jones, Newport West, 2019–24; Newport West and Islwyn, 2024–present
- Sarah Jones, Croydon Central, 2017–24; Croydon West, 2024–present
- Susan Elan Jones, Clwyd South, 2010–19
- Thomas Mardy Jones, Pontypridd, 1922–31
- Gurinder Josan, Smethwick, 2024–present
- Sojan Joseph, Ashford, 2024–present
- Tessa Jowell, Dulwich, 1992–97; Dulwich and West Norwood, 1997–2015
- Fred Jowett, Bradford West, 1906–18; Bradford East, 1922–24; 1929–31
- Eric Joyce, Falkirk West, 2000–05; Falkirk, 2005–12
- Warinder Juss, Wolverhampton West, 2024–present

=== K ===
- Chris Kane, Stirling and Strathallan, 2024–present
- Mike Kane, Wythenshawe and Sale East, 2014–present
- Gerald Kaufman, Manchester Ardwick, 1970–83; Manchester Gorton, 1983–2017
- Satvir Kaur, Southampton Test, 2024–present
- Sally Keeble, Northampton North, 1997–2010
- Barbara Keeley, Worsley, 2005–10; Worsley and Eccles South, 2010–24
- Alan Keen, Feltham and Heston, 1992–2011
- Ann Keen, Brentford and Isleworth, 1997–2010
- George Davy Kelley, Manchester South West, 1906–10
- Ruth Kelly, Bolton West, 1997–2010
- Fraser Kemp, Houghton and Washington East, 1997–2010
- Liz Kendall, Leicester West, 2010–present
- Jane Kennedy, Liverpool Broadgreen, 1992–97; Liverpool Wavertree, 1997–2010
- Tom Kennedy, Kirkcaldy Burghs, 1921–22; 1923–31; 1935–44
- Joseph Kenworthy, Kingston upon Hull Central, 1926–31
- Barnet Kenyon, Chesterfield, 1914–29
- Piara Khabra, Ealing Southall, 1992–2007
- Afzal Khan, Manchester Gorton, 2017–24; Manchester Rusholme, 2024–present
- Naushabah Khan, Gillingham and Rainham, 2024–present
- Sadiq Khan, Tooting, 2005–16
- David Kidney, Stafford, 1997–2010
- Peter Kilfoyle, Liverpool Walton, 1991–2010
- Ged Killen, Rutherglen and Hamilton West, 2017–19
- Robert Kilroy-Silk, Ormskirk, 1974–83; Knowsley North, 1983–86
- Andy King, Rugby and Kenilworth, 1997–2005
- Oona King, Bethnal Green and Bow, 1997–2005
- Tess Kingham, Gloucester, 1997–2001
- Neil Kinnock, Islwyn, 1970–95
- Stephen Kinnock, Aberavon, 2015–24; Aberafan Maesteg, 2024–present
- Jayne Kirkham, Truro and Falmouth, 2024–present
- David Kirkwood, Dumbarton Burghs, 1922–50; East Dunbartonshire, 1950–51
- Gen Kitchen, Wellingborough, 2024; Wellingborough and Rushden, 2024–present
- Jim Knight, South Dorset, 2001–10
- Ashok Kumar, Langbaurgh, 1991–92; Middlesbrough South and East Cleveland, 1997–2010
- Sonia Kumar, Dudley, 2024–present
- Uma Kumaran, Stratford and Bow, 2024–present
- Peter Kyle, Hove, 2015–24; Hove and Portslade, 2024–present
- Laura Kyrke-Smith, Aylesbury, 2024–present

=== L ===
- Stephen Ladyman, South Thanet, 1997–2010
- Lesley Laird, Kirkcaldy and Cowdenbeath, 2017–19
- Peter Lamb, Crawley, 2024–present
- David Lammy, Tottenham, 2000–present
- George Lansbury, Bow and Bromley, 1910–12; 1922–40
- Ian Lavery, Wansbeck, 2010–24; Blyth and Ashington, 2024–present
- Noah Law, St Austell and Newquay, 2024–present
- Jackie Lawrence, Preseli Pembrokeshire, 1997–2005
- Susan Lawrence, East Ham North, 1923–24; 1926–31
- Jack Lawson, Chester-le-Street, 1919–50
- Bob Laxton, Derby North, 1997–2010
- Mark Lazarowicz, Edinburgh North and Leith, 2001–15
- William Leach, Bradford Central, 1922–24; 1929–31; 1935–45
- Kim Leadbeater, Batley and Spen, 2021–24; Spen Valley, 2024–present
- Frank Lee, North East Derbyshire, 1922–31; 1935–41
- Fred Lee, Manchester Hulme, 1945–50; Newton, 1950–74
- Jennie Lee, North Lanarkshire, 1929–31; Cannock, 1945–70
- Karen Lee, Lincoln, 2017–19
- Hastings Lees-Smith, Keighley, 1922–23; 1924–31; 1935–42
- Ron Leighton, Newham North East, 1979–94
- Brian Leishman, Alloa and Grangemouth, 2024–present
- David Lepper, Brighton Pavilion, 1997–2010
- Chris Leslie, Shipley, 1997–2005; Nottingham East, 2010–19
- Tom Levitt, High Peak, 1997–2010
- Emma Lewell-Buck, South Shields, 2013–present
- Andrew Lewin, Welwyn Hatfield, 2024–present
- Clive Lewis, Norwich South, 2015–present
- Ivan Lewis, Bury South, 1997–2017
- Terence Lewis, Worsley, 1983–2005
- Helen Liddell, Monklands East, 1994–97; Airdrie and Shotts, 1997–2005
- Fred Lindley, Rotherham, 1923–31
- Simon Lightwood, Wakefield, 2022–24; Wakefield and Rothwell, 2024–present
- Martin Linton, Battersea, 1997–2010
- Ken Livingstone, Brent East, 1987–2000
- Tony Lloyd, Stretford, 1983–97; Manchester Central, 1997–2012; Rochdale, 2017–24
- David Lock, Wyre Forest, 1997–2001
- Mark Logan, Bolton North East, 2024
- Rebecca Long-Bailey, Salford and Eccles, 2015–24; Salford, 2024–present
- Thomas Lowth, Manchester Ardwick, 1922–31
- Andy Love, Edmonton, 1997–2015
- Ian Lucas, Wrexham, 2001–19
- Iain Luke, Dundee East, 2001–05
- William Lunn, Rothwell, 1918–42
- Holly Lynch, Halifax, 2015–24
- John Lyons, Strathkelvin and Bearsden, 2001–05

=== M ===
- Josh MacAlister, Whitehaven and Workington, 2024–present
- John McAllion, Dundee East, 1987–2001
- Douglas McAllister, West Dunbartonshire, 2024–present
- Tommy McAvoy, Glasgow Rutherglen, 1987–2005; Rutherglen and Hamilton West, 2005–10
- Steve McCabe, Birmingham Hall Green, 1997–2010; Birmingham Selly Oak, 2010–24
- Christine McCafferty, Calder Valley, 1997–2010
- Michael McCann, East Kilbride, Strathaven and Lesmahagow, 2010–15
- Kerry McCarthy, Bristol East, 2005–present
- Sarah McCarthy-Fry, Portsmouth North, 2005–10
- Ian McCartney, Makerfield, 1987–2010
- Martin McCluskey, Inverclyde and Renfrewshire West, 2024–present
- Gregg McClymont, Cumbernauld, Kilsyth and Kirkintilloch East, 2010–15
- Siobhain McDonagh, Mitcham and Morden, 1997–present
- Alice Macdonald, Norwich North, 2024–present
- Andy McDonald, Middlesbrough, 2012–24; Middlesbrough and Thornaby East, 2024–present
- Calum MacDonald, Western Isles, 1987–2005
- Chris McDonald, Stockton North, 2024–present
- **Ramsay MacDonald**, Leicester, 1906–18; Aberavon, 1922–29; Seaham, 1929–31
- John McDonnell, Hayes and Harlington, 1997–present
- Blair McDougall, East Renfrewshire, 2024–present
- John MacDougall, Central Fife, 2001–05; Glenrothes, 2005–08
- Valentine McEntee, Walthamstow West, 1922–24; 1929–50
- Lola McEvoy, Darlington, 2024–present
- Pat McFadden, Wolverhampton South East, 2005–present
- John McFall, Dumbarton, 1987–2005; West Dunbartonshire, 2005–10
- Conor McGinn, St Helens North, 2015–22
- Alison McGovern, Wirral South, 2010–24; Birkenhead, 2024–present
- Jim McGovern, Dundee West, 2005–15
- Anne McGuire, Stirling, 1997–2015
- Liz McInnes, Heywood and Middleton, 2014–19
- Alex McIntyre, Gloucester, 2024–present
- Shona McIsaac, Cleethorpes, 1997–2010
- Ann McKechin, Glasgow Maryhill, 2001–05; Glasgow North, 2005–15
- Gordon McKee, Glasgow South, 2024–present
- Kevin McKenna, Sittingbourne and Sheppey, 2024–present
- Rosemary McKenna, Cumbernauld and Kilsyth, 1997–2005; Cumbernauld, Kilsyth and Kirkintilloch East, 2005–10
- Iain McKenzie, Inverclyde, 2011–2015
- William Mackinder, Shipley, 1923–30
- Andrew MacKinlay, Thurrock, 1992–2010
- Catherine McKinnell, Newcastle upon Tyne North, 2010–present
- Andrew MacLaren, North West Staffordshire, 1916–18; Stoke-on-Trent Burslem, 1922–23; 1924–31; 1935–45
- Neil Maclean, Glasgow Govan, 1918–50
- Henry McLeish, Central Fife, 1987–2001
- Jim McMahon, Oldham West and Royton, 2015–24; Oldham West, Chadderton and Royton, 2024–present
- Gordon McMaster, Paisley South, 1990–97
- Anna McMorrin, Cardiff North, 2017–present
- Andy MacNae, Rossendale and Darwen, 2024–present
- Frank McNally, Coatbridge and Bellshill, 2024–present
- Kevin McNamara, Kingston upon Hull North, 1966–74; Kingston upon Hull Central, 1974–83; Kingston upon Hull North, 1983–2005
- Kirsty McNeill, Midlothian, 2024–present
- Tony McNulty, Harrow East, 1997–2010
- John Thomas Macpherson, Preston, 1906–10
- Denis MacShane, Rotherham, 1994–2010
- Bob McTaggart, Glasgow Central, 1980–89
- Fiona Mactaggart, Slough, 1997–2017
- Tony McWalter, Hemel Hempstead, 1997–2005
- John McWilliam, Blaydon, 1979–2005
- Dickson Mabon, Greenock, 1959–74; Greenock and Port Glasgow, 1974 (February)–83
- George Machin, Dundee East, 1973–74
- Justin Madders, Ellesmere Port and Neston, 2015–24; Ellesmere Port and Bromborough, 2024–present
- Khalid Mahmood, Birmingham Perry Barr, 2001–24
- Shabana Mahmood, Birmingham Ladywood, 2010–present
- Alice Mahon, Halifax, 1987–2005
- Seema Malhotra, Feltham and Heston, 2011–present
- Shahid Malik, Dewsbury, 2005–10
- Judy Mallaber, Amber Valley, 1997–2010
- Peter Mandelson, Hartlepool, 1992–2004
- John Mann, Bassetlaw, 2001–19
- Samuel March, Poplar South, 1922–31
- Michael Marcus, Dundee, 1929–31
- John Marek, Wrexham, 1983–2001
- James Marley, St Pancras North, 1923–24; 1929–31
- Rob Marris, Wolverhampton South West, 2001–10; 2015–17
- Gordon Marsden, Blackpool South, 1997–2019
- Paul Marsden, Shrewsbury and Atcham, 1997–2001
- David Marshall, Glasgow Shettleston, 1979–2005; Glasgow East, 2005–08
- Jim Marshall, Leicester South, 1974–83; 1987–2004
- Bob Marshall-Andrews, Medway, 1997–2010
- Amanda Martin, Portsmouth North, 2024–present
- Joseph Martin, St Pancras East, 1910–18
- Michael Martin, Glasgow Springburn, 1979–2000
- Sandy Martin, Ipswich, 2017–19
- William Henry Porteous Martin, Dunbartonshire, 1923–24
- Eric Martlew, Carlisle, 1987–2010
- Rachael Maskell, York Central, 2015–present
- Keir Mather, Selby and Ainsty, 2023–24; Selby, 2024–present
- Chris Matheson, City of Chester, 2015–22
- Charles James Mathew, Whitechapel and St George's, 1922–23
- James Maxton, Glasgow Bridgeton, 1922–31
- John Maxton, Glasgow Cathcart, 1979–2001
- Alex Mayer, Dunstable and Leighton Buzzard, 2024–present
- Michael Meacher, Oldham West, 1970–97; Oldham West and Royton, 1997–2015
- Alan Meale, Mansfield, 1987–2017
- Ian Mearns, Gateshead, 2010–24
- Gillian Merron, Lincoln, 1997–2010
- Alun Michael, Cardiff South and Penarth, 1987–2012
- Bill Michie, Sheffield Heeley, 1983–2001
- George Middleton, Carlisle, 1922–23; 1929–31
- Anneliese Midgley, Knowsley, 2024–present
- Alan Milburn, Darlington, 1992–2010
- David Miliband, South Shields, 2001–13
- Ed Miliband, Doncaster North, 2005–present
- Bruce Millan, Glasgow Craigton, 1959–83; Glasgow Govan, 1983–88
- Andrew Miller, Ellesmere Port and Neston, 1992–2015
- John Edmund Mills, Dartford, 1920–22; 1923–24; 1929–31
- Julie Minns, Carlisle, 2024–present
- Navendu Mishra, Stockport, 2019–present
- Austin Mitchell, Great Grimsby, 1977–2015
- Laura Moffatt, Crawley, 1997–2010
- Abtisam Mohamed, Sheffield Central, 2024–present
- Chris Mole, Ipswich, 2001–10
- Frederick Montague, Islington West, 1923–31; 1935–47
- Madeleine Moon, Bridgend, 2005–19
- Perran Moon, Camborne and Redruth, 2024–present
- Lewis Moonie, Kirkcaldy, 1987–2005
- Margaret Moran, Luton South, 1997–2010
- Jessica Morden, Newport East, 2005–present
- Edmund Dene Morel, Dundee, 1922–24
- David Watts Morgan, Rhondda East, 1918–33
- Julie Morgan, Cardiff North, 1997–2010
- Rhodri Morgan, Cardiff West, 1987–2001
- Stephen Morgan, Portsmouth South, 2017–present
- Elliot Morley, Glanford and Scunthorpe, 1987–97; Scunthorpe, 1997–2010
- Graeme Morrice, Livingston, 2010–15
- Alf Morris, Manchester Wythenshawe, 1964–97
- Estelle Morris, Birmingham Yardley, 1992–2005
- Grahame Morris, Easington, 2010–present
- Joe Morris, Hexham, 2024–present
- John Morris, Aberavon, 1959–2001
- Herbert Morrison, Hackney South, 1923–24; 1929–31; 1935–45; Lewisham East, 1945–50; Lewisham South, 1950–59
- Robert Morrison, Tottenham North, 1927–31; 1935–45
- Kali Mountford, Colne Valley, 1997–2010
- Mo Mowlam, Redcar, 1987–2001
- George Mudie, Leeds East, 1992–2015
- John William Muir, Glasgow Maryhill, 1922–24
- Margaret Mullane, Dagenham and Rainham, 2024–present
- Chris Mullin, Sunderland South, 1987–2010
- Meg Munn, Sheffield Heeley, 2001–15
- Hugh Murnin, Stirling and Falkirk, 1922–23; 1924–31
- Denis Murphy, Wansbeck, 1997–2010
- Jim Murphy, Eastwood, 1997–2005; East Renfrewshire, 2005–15
- Luke Murphy, Basingstoke, 2024–present
- Paul Murphy, Torfaen, 1987–2015
- Chris Murray, Edinburgh East and Musselburgh, 2024–present
- Ian Murray, Edinburgh South, 2010–present
- James Murray, Ealing North, 2019–present
- Katrina Murray, Cumbernauld and Kirkintilloch, 2024–present
- Robert Murray, West Renfrewshire, 1922–24
- Luke Myer, Middlesbrough South and East Cleveland, 2024–present
- Tom Myers, Spen Valley, 1919–22

=== N ===
- James Naish, Rushcliffe, 2024–present
- Connor Naismith, Crewe and Nantwich, 2024–present
- Lisa Nandy, Wigan, 2010–present
- Kanishka Narayan, Vale of Glamorgan, 2024–present
- Pamela Nash, Airdrie and Shotts, 2010–15; Motherwell, Wishaw and Carluke, 2024–present
- Thomas Ellis Naylor, Southwark South East, 1921–22; 1923–31; 1935–50
- Doug Naysmith, Bristol North West, 1997–2010
- Dave Nellist, Coventry South East, 1983–92
- Josh Newbury, Cannock Chase, 2024–present
- Samantha Niblett, South Derbyshire, 2024–present
- Robert Nichol, East Renfrewshire, 1922–24
- Charlotte Nichols, Warrington North, 2019–present
- Henry Nixon, The Wrekin, 1923–24
- Alex Norris, Nottingham North, 2017–24; Nottingham North and Kimberley, 2024–present
- Dan Norris, Wansdyke, 1997–2010; North East Somerset and Hanham, 2024–present

=== O ===
- Bill O'Brien, Normanton, 1983–2005
- Mike O'Brien, North Warwickshire, 1992–2010
- Fiona O'Donnell, East Lothian, 2010–15
- James O'Grady, Leeds East, 1906–18; Leeds South East, 1918–24
- Edward O'Hara, Knowsley South, 1990–2010
- Jared O'Mara, Sheffield Hallam, 2017–18
- Martin O'Neill, Clackmannan and Eastern Stirlingshire, 1979–83; Clackmannan, 1983–97; Ochil, 1997–2005
- George Oliver, Ilkeston, 1922–31; 1935–64
- Bill Olner, Nuneaton, 1992–2010
- Fiona Onasanya, Peterborough, 2017–18
- Alfred Onions, Caerphilly, 1918–22
- Melanie Onn, Great Grimsby, 2015–19; Great Grimsby and Cleethorpes, 2024–present
- Chi Onwurah, Newcastle upon Tyne Central, 2010–24; Newcastle upon Tyne Central and West, 2024–present
- Simon Opher, Stroud, 2024–present
- Abena Oppong-Asare, Erith and Thamesmead, 2019–present
- Diana Organ, Forest of Dean, 1997–2005
- Kate Osamor, Edmonton, 2015–24; Edmonton and Winchmore Hill, 2024–present
- Kate Osborne, Jarrow, 2019–24; Jarrow and Gateshead East, 2024–present
- Sandra Osborne, Ayr, 1997–2005; Ayr, Carrick and Cumnock, 2005–15
- Tris Osborne, Chatham and Aylesford, 2024–present
- Taiwo Owatemi, Coventry North West, 2019–present
- Albert Owen, Ynys Môn, 2001–19
- Sarah Owen, Luton North, 2019–present

=== P ===
- Darren Paffey, Southampton Itchen, 2024–present
- Andrew Pakes, Peterborough, 2024–present
- Wilfred Paling, Doncaster, 1922–31; Wentworth, 1933–50; Dearne Valley, 1950–59
- Edward Timothy Palmer, Greenwich, 1923–24; 1929–31
- Nick Palmer, Broxtowe, 1997–2010
- James Parker, Halifax, 1906–18
- Harper Parker, Stoke-on-Trent Stoke, 1922–24
- Allen Parkinson, Wigan, 1918–41
- Terry Patchett, Barnsley East, 1983–96
- Matthew Patrick, Wirral West, 2024–present
- Laurie Pavitt, Willesden West, 1959–74; Brent South, 1974–87
- Michael Payne, Gedling, 2024–present
- Stephanie Peacock, Barnsley East, 2017–24; Barnsley South, 2024–present
- Jon Pearce, High Peak, 2024–present
- Teresa Pearce, Erith and Thamesmead, 2010–19
- Ian Pearson, Dudley West, 1994–97; Dudley South, 1997–2010
- Tom Pendry, Stalybridge and Hyde, 1970–2001
- Matthew Pennycook, Greenwich and Woolwich, 2015–present
- Linda Perham, Ilford North, 1997–2005
- Toby Perkins, Chesterfield, 2010–present
- Wesley Perrins, Birmingham Yardley, 1945–50
- Samuel Perry, Kettering, 1929–31
- Frederick Pethick-Lawrence, Leicester West, 1923–31; Edinburgh East, 1935–45
- Jess Phillips, Birmingham Yardley, 2015–present
- Bridget Phillipson, Houghton and Sunderland South, 2010–present
- Anne Picking, East Lothian, 2001–10
- Colin Pickthall, West Lancashire, 1992–2005
- Laura Pidcock, North West Durham, 2017–19
- Peter Pike, Burnley, 1983–2005
- David Pinto-Duschinsky, Hendon, 2024–present
- Lee Pitcher, Doncaster East and the Isle of Axholme, 2024–present
- James Plaskitt, Warwick and Leamington, 1997–2010
- Jo Platt, Leigh, 2017–19; Leigh and Atherton, 2024–present
- Joseph Pointer, Sheffield Attercliffe, 1909–14
- Kerry Pollard, St Albans, 1997–2005
- Luke Pollard, Plymouth Sutton and Devonport, 2017–present
- Chris Pond, Gravesham, 1997–2005
- Arthur Ponsonby, Sheffield Brightside, 1922–30
- Greg Pope, Hyndburn, 1992–2010
- Edward Porter, Warrington, 1945–50
- John Samuel Potts, Barnsley, 1922–31
- Dan Poulter, Central Suffolk and North Ipswich, 2024
- Stephen Pound, Ealing North, 1997–2019
- Joe Powell, Kensington and Bayswater, 2024–present
- Lucy Powell, Manchester Central, 2012–present
- Ray Powell, Ogmore, 1979–2001
- Gregor Poynton, Livingston, 2024–present
- Bridget Prentice, Lewisham East, 1992–2010
- Gordon Prentice, Pendle, 1992–2010
- John Prescott, Kingston upon Hull East, 1970–2010
- Dawn Primarolo, Bristol South, 1987–2015
- Peter Prinsley, Bury St Edmunds and Stowmarket, 2024–present
- Gwyn Prosser, Dover, 1997–2010
- Albert Arthur Purcell, Coventry, 1923–24; Forest of Dean, 1925–29
- Ken Purchase, Wolverhampton North East, 1992–2010
- James Purnell, Stalybridge and Hyde, 2001–10

=== Q ===
- David Quibell, Brigg, 1929–31; 1935–45
- Richard Quigley, Isle of Wight West, 2024–present
- Joyce Quin, Gateshead East, 1987–97; Gateshead East and Washington West, 1997–2005
- Lawrie Quinn, Scarborough and Whitby, 1997–2005
- Yasmin Qureshi, Bolton South East, 2010–24; Bolton South and Walkden, 2024–present

=== R ===
- Steve Race, Exeter, 2024–present
- Giles Radice, Chester-le-Street, 1973–83; North Durham, 1983–2001
- Bill Rammell, Harlow, 1997–2010
- Connor Rand, Altrincham and Sale West, 2024–present
- Andrew Ranger, Wrexham, 2024–present
- Syd Rapson, Portsmouth North, 1997–2005
- Faisal Rashid, Warrington South, 2017–19
- Angela Rayner, Ashton-under-Lyne, 2015–present
- William Raynes, Derby, 1923–24; 1929–31
- Nick Raynsford, Fulham, 1986–87; Greenwich, 1992–97; Greenwich and Woolwich, 1997–2015
- Mike Reader, Northampton South, 2024–present
- Andy Reed, Loughborough, 1997–2010
- Jamie Reed, Copeland, 2005–17
- Steve Reed, Croydon North, 2012–24; Streatham and Croydon North, 2024–present
- Christina Rees, Neath, 2015–24
- Ellie Reeves, Lewisham West and Penge, 2017–24; Lewisham West and East Dulwich, 2024–present
- Rachel Reeves, Leeds West, 2010–24; Leeds West and Pudsey, 2024–present
- Joani Reid, East Kilbride and Strathaven, 2024–present
- John Reid, Motherwell North, 1987–97; Hamilton North and Bellshill, 1997–2005; Airdrie and Shotts, 2005–10
- Emma Reynolds, Wolverhampton North East, 2010–19; Wycombe, 2024–present
- Jonathan Reynolds, Stalybridge and Hyde, 2010–present
- Geoffrey Rhodes, Newcastle upon Tyne East, 1964–74
- Martin Rhodes, Glasgow North, 2024–present
- Bell Ribeiro-Addy, Streatham, 2019–24; Clapham and Brixton Hill, 2024–present
- Freddy Richards, Wolverhampton West, 1906–10
- Jake Richards, Rother Valley, 2024–present
- Robert Richards, Wrexham, 1922–24; 1929–31; 1935–54
- Tom Richards, Ebbw Vale, 1910–23
- Jo Richardson, Barking, 1974–94
- Robert Richardson, Houghton-le-Spring, 1918–31
- Thomas Richardson, Whitehaven, 1910–18
- Jenny Riddell-Carpenter, Suffolk Coastal, 2024–present
- Lucy Rigby, Northampton North, 2024–present
- Benjamin Riley, Dewsbury, 1922–23; 1924–31; 1935–45
- Marie Rimmer, St Helens South and Whiston, 2015–present
- Linda Riordan, Halifax, 2005–15
- Joshua Ritson, City of Durham, 1922–31; 1935–45
- Alfred Robens, Wansbeck, 1945–50; Blyth, 1950–60
- Allan Roberts, Bootle, 1979–90
- Frederick Owen Roberts, West Bromwich, 1918–31; 1935–41
- George Henry Roberts, Norwich, 1906–16
- Dave Robertson, Lichfield, 2024–present
- George Robertson, Hamilton, 1978–97; Hamilton South, 1997–99
- John Robertson, Bothwell, 1919–26
- John Robertson, Glasgow Anniesland, 2000–05; Glasgow North West, 2005–15
- John Home Robertson, Berwick and East Lothian, 1978–83; East Lothian, 1983–2001
- Geoffrey Robinson, Coventry North West, 1976–2019
- William Cornforth Robinson, Elland, 1922–23; 1924–29
- Tim Roca, Macclesfield, 2024–present
- Barbara Roche, Hornsey and Wood Green, 1992–2005
- Matt Rodda, Reading East, 2017–24; Reading Central, 2024–present
- Bill Rodgers, Stockton-on-Tees, 1962–81
- Allan Rogers, Rhondda, 1983–2001
- Herbert Romeril, St Pancras South East, 1923–24; 1929–31
- Jeff Rooker, Birmingham Perry Barr, 1974–2001
- Terry Rooney, Bradford North, 1990–2010
- John Roper, Farnworth, 1970–83
- Frank Herbert Rose, Aberdeen North, 1918–28
- Ernie Ross, Dundee West, 1979–2005
- Willie Ross, Kilmarnock, 1946–79
- Steve Rotheram, Liverpool Walton, 2010–17
- Ted Rowlands, Merthyr Tydfil, 1972–83; Merthyr Tydfil and Rhymney, 1983–2001
- Danielle Rowley, Midlothian, 2017–19
- Frank Roy, Motherwell and Wishaw, 1997–2015
- Lindsay Roy, Glenrothes, 2008–15
- William Stapleton Royce, Holland with Boston, 1918–24
- Chris Ruane, Vale of Clwyd, 1997–2015; 2017–19
- Joan Ruddock, Lewisham Deptford, 1987–2015
- Sam Rushworth, Bishop Auckland, 2024–present
- Christine Russell, City of Chester, 1997–2010
- Sarah Russell, Congleton, 2024–present
- Lloyd Russell-Moyle, Brighton Kemptown, 2017–24
- Tom Rutland, East Worthing and Shoreham, 2024–present
- Joan Ryan, Enfield North, 1997–2010; 2015–19
- Oliver Ryan, Burnley, 2024–present

=== S ===
- Sarah Sackman, Finchley and Golders Green, 2024–present
- Shapurji Saklatvala, Battersea North, 1922–23
- Alfred Salter, Bermondsey West, 1922–23; 1924–45
- Martin Salter, Reading West, 1997–2010
- Howel Samuel, Swansea West, 1923–24; 1929–31
- Jeevun Sandher, Loughborough, 2024–present
- Louise Sandher-Jones, North East Derbyshire, 2024–present
- Anas Sarwar, Glasgow Central, 2010–15
- Mohammed Sarwar, Glasgow Govan, 1997–2005; Glasgow Central, 2005–10
- Malcolm Savidge, Aberdeen North, 1997–2005
- Andy Sawford, Corby, 2012-15
- Phil Sawford, Kettering, 1997–2005
- Michelle Scrogham, Barrow and Furness, 2024–present
- John Scurr, Mile End, 1923–31
- Alison Seabeck, Plymouth Devonport, 2005–10; Plymouth Moor View, 2010–15
- James Seddon, Newton, 1906–10
- Brian Sedgemore, Luton West, 1974–79; Hackney South and Shoreditch, 1983–2005
- Mark Sewards, Leeds South West and Morley, 2024–present
- James Sexton, St Helens, 1918–31
- David Shackleton, Clitheroe, 1902–10
- Naz Shah, Bradford West, 2015–present
- Baggy Shanker, Derby South, 2024–present
- Michael Shanks, Rutherglen and Hamilton West 2023–24; Rutherglen, 2024–present
- Virendra Sharma, Ealing Southall, 2007–24
- Jonathan Shaw, Chatham and Aylesford, 1997–2010
- Thomas Shaw, Preston, 1918–31
- Barry Sheerman, Huddersfield East, 1979–83; Huddersfield, 1983–2024
- Robert Sheldon, Ashton-under-Lyne, 1964–2001
- James Sheridan, West Renfrewshire, 2001–05; Paisley and North Renfrewshire, 2005–15
- Paula Sherriff, Dewsbury, 2015–19
- Drummond Shiels, Edinburgh East, 1924–31
- Manny Shinwell, Linlithgow, 1922–24; 1928–31; Seaham, 1935–50; Easington, 1950–70
- Debra Shipley, Stourbridge, 1997–2005
- Alfred Short, Wednesbury, 1918–31
- Clare Short, Birmingham Ladywood, 1983–2006
- Gavin Shuker, Luton South, 2010–19
- Tulip Siddiq, Hampstead and Kilburn, 2015–24; Hampstead and Highgate, 2024–present
- Dennis Skinner, Bolsover, 1970–2019
- Siôn Simon, Birmingham Erdington, 2001–10
- Josh Simons, Makerfield, 2024–26
- Alan Simpson, Nottingham South, 1992–2010
- Marsha Singh, Bradford South, 1997–2012
- Charles Sitch, Kingswinford, 1918–31
- Andy Slaughter, Ealing, Acton and Shepherd's Bush, 2005–10; Hammersmith, 2010–24; Hammersmith and Chiswick, 2024–present
- Henry Slesser, Leeds South East, 1924–29
- John Slinger, Rugby, 2024–present
- Ruth Smeeth, Stoke-on-Trent North, 2015–19
- Robert Smillie, Morpeth, 1923–29
- Albert Smith, Clitheroe, 1910–18; Nelson and Colne, 1918–20
- Andrew Smith, Oxford East, 1987–2017
- Angela Smith, Sheffield Hillsborough, 2005–10; Penistone and Stocksbridge, 2010–19
- Angela Smith, Basildon, 1997–2010
- Benjamin Smith, Rotherhithe, 1923–31; 1935–46
- Cat Smith, Lancaster and Fleetwood, 2015–24; Lancaster and Wyre, 2024–present
- Chris Smith, Islington South and Finsbury, 1983–2005
- David Smith, North Northumberland, 2024–present
- Eleanor Smith, Wolverhampton South West, 2017–19
- Geraldine Smith, Morecambe and Lunesdale, 1997–2010
- Jacqui Smith, Redditch, 1997–2010
- Jeff Smith, Manchester Withington, 2015–present
- John Smith, North Lanarkshire, 1970–83; Monklands East, 1983–94
- John Smith, Vale of Glamorgan, 1989–92; 1997–2010
- Laura Smith, Crewe and Nantwich, 2017–19
- Llew Smith, Blaenau Gwent, 1992–2005
- Nick Smith, Blaenau Gwent, 2010–24; Blaenau Gwent and Rhymney, 2024–present
- Owen Smith, Pontypridd, 2010–19
- Rennie Smith, Penistone, 1924–31
- Sarah Smith, Hyndburn, 2024–present
- Tom Smith, Pontefract, 1922–24; 1929–31; Pontefract, 1933–47
- Walter Robert Smith, Wellingborough, 1918–22
- Karin Smyth, Bristol South, 2015–present
- Peter Snape, West Bromwich East, 1974–2001
- Anne Snelgrove, Swindon South, 2005–10
- Gareth Snell, Stoke-on-Trent Central, 2017–19; 2024–present
- Harry Snell, Woolwich East, 1922–31
- Philip Snowden, Blackburn, 1906–18; Colne Valley, 1922–31
- Alex Sobel, Leeds North West, 2017–24; Leeds Central and Headingley, 2024–present
- Clive Soley, Hammersmith North, 1979–83; Hammersmith, 1983–97; Ealing, Acton and Shepherd's Bush, 1997–2005
- Peter Soulsby, Leicester South, 2005–11
- Helen Southworth, Warrington South, 1997–2010
- John Spellar, Birmingham Northfield, 1982–83; Warley West, 1992–97; Warley, 1997–2024
- Robert Spence, Berwick and Haddington, 1923–24
- George Alfred Spencer, Broxtowe, 1918–29
- Benjamin Spoor, Bishop Auckland, 1918–29
- Rachel Squire, Dunfermline West, 1992–2005; Dunfermline and West Fife, 2005–06
- Euan Stainbank, Falkirk, 2024–present
- Thomas Stamford, Leeds West, 1923–31
- Albert Stanley, North West Staffordshire, 1910–16
- Phyllis Starkey, Milton Keynes South West, 1997–2010
- **Keir Starmer**, Holborn and St Pancras, 2015–2026
- Gerry Steinberg, City of Durham, 1987–2005
- Campbell Stephen, Glasgow Camlachie, 1922–31; 1947–48
- Jo Stevens, Cardiff Central, 2015–24; Cardiff East, 2024–present
- Lewis Stevens, Nuneaton, 1983–92
- George Stevenson, Stoke-on-Trent South, 1992–2005
- Kenneth Stevenson, Airdrie and Shotts, 2024–present
- David Stewart, Inverness East, Nairn and Lochaber, 1997–2005
- Elaine Stewart, Ayr, Carrick and Cumnock, 2024–present
- Ian Stewart, Eccles, 1997–2010
- James Stewart, Glasgow St Rollox, 1922–31
- Paul Stinchcombe, Wellingborough, 1997–2005
- Howard Stoate, Dartford, 1997–2010
- Will Stone, Swindon North, 2024–present
- John Stonehouse, Wednesbury, 1959–74; Walsall North, 1974 (February)–76
- Roger Stott, Westhoughton, 1973–83; Wigan, 1983–99
- Gavin Strang, Edinburgh East, 1970–97; Edinburgh East and Musselburgh, 1997–2005; Edinburgh East, 2005–10
- Alistair Strathern, Mid Bedfordshire, 2023–24; Hitchin, 2024–present
- Jack Straw, Blackburn, 1979–2015
- Wes Streeting, Ilford North, 2015–present
- Alan Strickland, Newton Aycliffe and Spennymoor, 2024–present
- Graham Stringer, Manchester Blackley, 1997–2010; Blackley and Broughton, 2010–24; Blackley and Middleton South, 2024–present
- Barnett Stross, Hanely, 1945–50
- Gisela Stuart, Birmingham Edgbaston, 1997–2017
- Joseph Sullivan, North Lanarkshire, 1922–24
- Kirsteen Sullivan, Bathgate and Linlithgow, 2024–present
- Lauren Sullivan, Gravesham, 2024–present
- Zarah Sultana, Coventry South, 2019–present
- Thomas Summerbell, Sunderland, 1906–10
- Gerry Sutcliffe, Bradford South, 1994–2015
- John Edward Sutton, Manchester East, 1910–18; Manchester Clayton, 1922; 1923–31
- Peter Swallow, Bracknell, 2024–present
- John Edmund Swan, Barnard Castle, 1918–22
- Paul Sweeney, Glasgow North East, 2017–19

=== T ===
- Mark Tami, Alyn and Deeside, 2001–present
- Mike Tapp, Dover and Deal, 2024–present
- Sam Tarry, Ilford South, 2019–24
- Alison Taylor, Paisley and Renfrewshire North, 2024–present
- Ann Taylor, Bolton West, 1974–83; Dewsbury, 1987–2005
- Dari Taylor, Stockton South, 1997–2010
- David Taylor, Hemel Hempstead, 2024–present
- David Taylor, North West Leicestershire, 1997–2009
- John Wilkinson Taylor, Chester-le-Street, 1906–19
- Rachel Taylor, North Warwickshire and Bedworth, 2024–present
- Robert Arthur Taylor, Lincoln, 1924–31
- Peter Temple-Morris, Leominster, 1998–2001
- Fred Thomas, Plymouth Moor View, 2024–present
- James Henry Thomas, Derby, 1910–31
- Gareth Thomas, Harrow West, 1997–present
- Gareth Thomas, Clwyd West, 1997–2005
- Owen Thomas, Anglesey, 1919–20
- Nick Thomas-Symonds, Torfaen, 2015–present
- Adam Thompson, Erewash, 2024–present
- Emily Thornberry, Islington South and Finsbury, 2005–present
- Will Thorne, West Ham, 1906–18; Plaistow, 1918–45
- Ernest Thurtle, Shoreditch, 1923–31; 1935–50; Shoreditch and Finsbury, 1950–54
- Marie Tidball, Penistone and Stocksbridge, 2024–present
- Syd Tierney, Birmingham Yardley 1974–79
- Ben Tillett, Salford, 1917–24; 1929–31
- Stephen Timms, Newham North East, 1994–97; East Ham, 1997–present
- John Joseph Tinker, Leigh, 1923–45
- Paddy Tipping, Sherwood, 1992–2010
- Jessica Toale, Bournemouth West, 2024–present
- Mark Todd, South Derbyshire, 1997–2010
- Dan Tomlinson, Chipping Barnet, 2024–present
- Joseph Toole, Salford South, 1923–24; 1929–31
- Robert Tootill, Bolton, 1914–22
- Don Touhig, Islwyn, 1995–2010
- William John Tout, Oldham, 1922–24; Sowerby, 1929–31
- Charles Trevelyan, Elland, 1918; Newcastle upon Tyne Central, 1922–31
- Jon Trickett, Hemsworth, 1996–2024; Normanton and Hemsworth, 2024–present
- Paul Truswell, Pudsey, 1997–2010
- Henry Tufnell, Mid and South Pembrokeshire, 2024–present
- Anna Turley, Redcar, 2015–19; 2024–present
- Matt Turmaine, Watford, 2024–present
- Ben Turner, Batley and Morley, 1922–24; 1929–31
- Dennis Turner, Wolverhampton South East, 1987–2005
- Des Turner, Brighton Kemptown, 1997–2010
- George Turner, North West Norfolk, 1997–2001
- Karl Turner, Kingston upon Hull East, 2010–present
- Laurence Turner, Birmingham Northfield, 2024–present
- Neil Turner, Wigan, 1999–2010
- Moss Turner-Samuels, Barnard Castle, 1923–24; Gloucester, 1945–57
- Derek Twigg, Halton, 1997–2024; Widnes and Halewood, 2024–present
- Stephen Twigg, Enfield Southgate, 1997–2005; Liverpool West Derby, 2010–19
- Henry Twist, Leigh, 1922–23
- Liz Twist, Blaydon, 2017–24; Blaydon and Consett, 2024–present
- Bill Tynan, Hamilton South, 1999–2005

=== U ===
- Chuka Umunna, Streatham, 2010–19
- Lynn Ungoed-Thomas, Leicester South East, 1945–62
- Harpreet Uppal, Huddersfield, 2024–present
- Henry Usborne, Birmingham Yardley 1950–59
- Kitty Ussher, Burnley, 2005–10

=== V ===
- Eric Varley, Chesterfield, 1964–84
- Frank Varley, Mansfield, 1923–29
- David John Vaughan, Forest of Dean, 1929–31
- Tony Vaughan, Folkestone and Hythe, 2024–present
- Keith Vaz, Leicester East, 1987–2019
- Valerie Vaz, Walsall South, 2010–24; Walsall and Bloxwich, 2024–present
- Wilfrid Vernon, Dulwich, 1945–51
- Samuel Viant, Willesden West, 1923–31; 1935–59
- Chris Vince, Harlow, 2024–present
- Rudi Vis, Finchley and Golders Green, 1997–2010

=== W ===
- John Wadsworth, Hallamshire, 1910–18
- Christian Wakeford, Bury South, 2022–present
- Imogen Walker, Hamilton and Clyde Valley, 2024–present
- Thelma Walker, Colne Valley, 2017–19
- Pat Wall, Bradford North, 1987–90
- Joan Walley, Stoke-on-Trent North, 1987–2015
- Richard Wallhead, Merthyr, 1922–31; 1933–34
- Stephen Walsh, Ince, 1906–29
- Lynda Waltho, Stourbridge, 2005–10
- Chris Ward, Brighton Kempton and Peacehaven, 2024–present
- Claire Ward, Watford, 1997–2010
- Melanie Ward, Cowdenbeath and Kirkcaldy, 2024–present
- George Wardle, Stockport, 1906–16
- Bob Wareing, Liverpool West Derby, 1983–2007
- George Warne, Wansbeck, 1922–28
- Mike Watson, Glasgow Central, 1989–97
- Tom Watson, West Bromwich East, 2001–19
- William McLean Watson, Dunfermline Burghs, 1922–31; 1935–50
- David Watts, St Helens North, 1997–2015
- Paul Waugh, Rochdale, 2024–present
- Chris Webb, Blackpool South, 2024–present
- Claudia Webbe, Leicester East, 2019–20
- Sidney Webb, Seaham, 1922–29
- Josiah Wedgwood, Newcastle-under-Lyme, 1919–42
- MacNeill Weir, Clackmannan and Eastern Stirlingshire, 1922–31; 1935–39
- James Welsh, Paisley, 1929–31
- James C. Welsh, Coatbridge, 1922–31; Bothwell, 1935–45
- Michelle Welsh, Sherwood Forest, 2024–present
- Catherine West, Hornsey and Wood Green, 2015–24; Hornsey and Friern Barnet, 2024–present
- Andrew Western, Stretford and Urmston, 2022–present
- Matt Western, Warwick and Leamington, 2017–present
- John Wheatley, Glasgow Shettleston, 1922–30
- Michael Wheeler, Worsley and Eccles, 2024–present
- John Whitby, Derbyshire Dales, 2024–present
- Brian White, North East Milton Keynes, 1997–2005
- James White, Glasgow Pollok, 1970–87
- Jo White, Bassetlaw, 2024–present
- Katie White, Leeds North West, 2024–present
- Alan Whitehead, Southampton Test, 1997–2024
- William Whiteley, Blaydon, 1922–31; 1935–55
- Mick Whitley, Birkenhead, 2019–24
- Nadia Whittome, Notthingham East, 2019–present
- Martin Whitfield, East Lothian, 2017–19
- Malcolm Wicks, Croydon North West, 1992–97; Croydon North, 1997–2012
- James Wignall, Forest of Dean, 1918–25
- Lyall Wilkes, Newcastle upon Tyne Central, 1945–51
- Alex Wilkie, Dundee, 1906–22
- Ellen Wilkinson, Middlesbrough East, 1924–31; Jarrow, 1935–47
- Alan John Williams, Swansea West, 1964–2010
- Alan Wynne Williams, Carmarthen, 1987–97; Carmarthen East and Dinefwr, 1997–2001
- Betty Williams, Conwy, 1997–2010
- David Williams, Stoke-on-Trent North, 2024–present
- David Williams, Swansea East, 1922–40
- John Henry Williams, Llanelli, 1922–36
- John T. Williams, Gower, 1910–22
- Paul Williams, Stockton South, 2017–19
- Thomas Williams, Kennington, 1923–24
- Tom Williams, Don Valley, 1922–59
- Chris Williamson, Derby North, 2010–15; 2017–19
- Michael Wills, Swindon North, 1997–2010
- Brian Wilson, Cunninghame North, 1987–2005
- Cecil Henry Wilson, Sheffield Attercliffe, 1922–31; 1935–44
- **Harold Wilson**, Ormskirk, 1945–50; Huyton, 1950–83
- James Wilson, Dudley, 1921–23
- Phil Wilson, Sedgefield, 2007–19
- Robert John Wilson, Jarrow, 1922–31
- William Tyson Wilson, Westhoughton, 1906–21
- Walter Windsor, Bethnal Green North East, 1923–29; Kingston upon Hull Central, 1935–45
- David Winnick, Croydon South, 1966–70; Walsall North, 1979–2017
- Beth Winter, Cynon Valley, 2019–24
- Rosie Winterton, Doncaster Central, 1997–2024
- Audrey Wise, Coventry South West, 1974–79; Preston, 1987–2000
- Steve Witherden, Montgomeryshire and Glyndŵr, 2024–present
- Mike Wood, Batley and Spen, 1997–2015
- Arthur Woodburn, Clackmannan and Eastern Stirlingshire, 1939–70
- John Woodcock, Barrow and Furness, 2010–18
- Sean Woodcock, Banbury, 2024–present
- Shaun Woodward, Witney, 1999–2001; St Helens South, 2001–10; St Helens South and Whiston, 2010–15
- Phil Woolas, Oldham East and Saddleworth, 1997–2010
- Tony Worthington, Clydebank and Milngavie, 1987–2005
- Jimmy Wray, Glasgow Provan, 1987–97; Glasgow Baillieston, 1997–2005
- David Wright, Telford, 2001–15
- Iain Wright, Hartlepool, 2004–17
- Tony Wright, Cannock and Burntwood, 1992–97; Cannock Chase, 1997–2010
- Tony Wright, Great Yarmouth, 1997–2010
- William Wright, Rutherglen, 1922–31
- Rosie Wrighting, Kettering, 2024–present
- Derek Wyatt, Sittingbourne and Sheppey, 1997–2010

=== Y ===
- Yuan Yang, Earley and Woodley, 2024–present
- Mohammad Yasin, Bedford, 2017–present
- Victor Yates, Birmingham Ladywood, 1945–69
- Steve Yemm, Mansfield, 2024–present
- Andrew Young, Glasgow Partick, 1923–24
- Robert Young, Newton, 1918–31; 1935–50
- Robert Stanley Young, Islington North, 1929–31
- Kenneth Younger, Great Grimsby, 1945–59

=== Z ===
- Daniel Zeichner, Cambridge, 2015–present
- Konni Zilliacus, Gateshead, 1945–49; Manchester Gorton, 1955–67

== See also ==
- List of Labour and Co-operative Party MPs
