= William Irving (British politician) =

British politician (1892–1967)

William Charles John Irving (1 April 1892 – 15 March 1967) was a British Labour Co-operative politician.

After the 1945 general election, Robert Morrison, the Labour Member of Parliament (MP) for Tottenham North was elevated to the peerage as Baron Morrison. Irving was selected as the Labour candidate for the resulting by-election, which he won with a majority of 5,522 over the Conservative Party candidate, Petre Crowder.

A member of Middlesex County Council from 1937 to 1958, he was chairman of the council for 1948–49.

When the Tottenham North constituency was abolished for the 1950 general election, Irving was returned for the new Wood Green constituency, and held the seat until his retirement at the 1955 general election.

Parliament of the United Kingdom
Preceded by Robert Morrison	Member of Parliament for Tottenham North; 1945–1950	Constituency abolished
Preceded by Beverley Baxter	Member of Parliament for Wood Green; 1950–1955	Succeeded by Joyce Butler
