= Prescott baronets of Godmanchester (1938) =

Escutcheon of the Prescott baronets of Godmanchester

The Prescott baronetcy, of Godmanchester in the County of Huntingdon, was created in the Baronetage of the United Kingdom on 30 June 1938 for William Prescott. He was a civil engineer and represented Tottenham North in the House of Commons from 1918 to 1922. He served as Chairman of the Middlesex County Council, from 1936 to 1937.

The 3rd Baronet, who inherited from his uncle, is a Newmarket racehorse trainer.

== Prescott baronets, of Godmanchester (1938) ==
- Sir William Henry Prescott, 1st Baronet (1874–1945)
- Sir Richard Stanley Prescott, 2nd Baronet (1899–1965)
- Sir Mark Prescott, 3rd Baronet (born 1948)

== Extended family ==
Stanley Prescott, second son of the 1st Baronet and the father of the 3rd Baronet, sat as Member of Parliament for Darwen from 1943 to 1951.
