= Edward Doran =

British politician

Edward Doran (1 June 1885 – 15 December 1945) was a British film producer and politician who served as a Conservative Member of Parliament. He was known for his populism and for summing up his arguments in emotive phraseology. His reaction to the arrival of Jewish refugees verged on antisemitism and he hosted Hitler's representative at the House of Commons; however his alleged neglect of his constituency caused difficulties and he was defeated for re-election after a single term.

== Early life ==
Doran was born in Failsworth, Lancashire in 1885, although his year of birth is given inaccurately as 1892 in some sources, including Who's Who.

He was educated at St Mary's School in Failsworth, and at Manchester Grammar School. During the First World War, he enlisted in the Empire Battalion of the Royal Engineers; in January 1916, as a Corporal he claimed a world record for individual recruiting, having secured 8,700 recruits in the space of eleven months in London. First working on the railways, he later moved into the film industry, and later gave his occupation as film producer. Doran was an experienced traveller in Canada and the USA and gave lectures on life in North America, and on the history of the western United States.

== Silvertown candidacy ==
His entry into politics came in the 1924 general election when he fought the Silvertown division. Doran described himself as a "Constitutionalist", although he was included as a Conservative and Unionist in contemporary lists of candidates. As Silvertown had a large Labour majority he was thought to be up against heavy odds and his main hope was to reduce the majority rather than win the seat. He ended up trailing badly with only 3,702 votes while the re-elected Labour MP had nearly 16,000.

As a member of the Primrose League, Doran was lead speaker in support of the British Empire in a debate on "Communism v Imperialism" held at Speakers' Corner on 7 March 1926, arguing that the Empire had been built up on the spirit of liberty and gave British people more freedom than any other nation.

== Entry to Parliament ==
At the 1931 general election, Doran fought as a Conservative in Tottenham North, which had a Labour majority of 9,653 at the previous election. After a 'gallant challenge', Doran won the seat by a majority of 4,521. Early in his Parliamentary career he pressed for relaxations in the licensing laws in order to help British holiday resorts, and as a followup pressed for more licensed victuallers to be appointed as licensing magistrates. He also advocated that the Sunday Observance Acts should be abolished, and supported the rejection of a Bill which would have given local authorities the power to prohibit dog racing.

== Jewish refugees ==
Doran became known for raising issues relating to Jews. On 9 March 1933, he asked the Home Secretary to prevent "any alien Jews entering this country from Germany". Having received a discouraging answer, he pressed again to stop "hundreds of thousands of Jews .. scurrying .. to this country", eventually adding that a British version of Hitler would arise if action was not taken. On 26 April, Doran hosted a meeting at the House of Commons in the name of 'The Liberator Group' at which Adolf Hitler's representative in London spoke on "the true meaning of Germany's attitude towards the Jews". On 25 May he put down a written question asking for the number of registered moneylenders and their nationality; and in December 1933 he was to be found demanding action against 3,000 "fraudulent bankrupts, who are mainly alien Jews". The historian Richard Griffiths summed up his attitude as being obsessed by questions relating to Jews which affected the working class.

== Broadcasting policy ==
Another subject which interested Doran was broadcasting. He formed a committee to inquire into the BBC, On 14 March he pressed in Parliament for a reduction in the grant to the BBC. In March 1935 he made a speech which drew much laughter, claiming that George Lansbury had smuggled some of the Russian Crown Jewels to Britain in an attempt to raise funds for the Labour Party. On 11 April 1935, Doran (apparently working in concert with Major the hon. J.J. Stourton) returned to the subject of Jewish refugees and asked for restrictions to stop people at ports supplying refugees with money so that they satisfied the requirements of the Aliens Act.

== Constituency difficulties ==
Doran's performance in Parliament and alleged neglect of his constituency caused concern among his constituency association and in August 1933 the association called a special meeting at which it was speculated they might have decided to adopt another candidate. The association gave Doran its backing, the Chairman telling the local paper that "any man who sided with the Jew persecution .. was a cad". The dispute re-emerged in the summer of 1935. A meeting on 22 July rejected a motion of no confidence in Doran by 123 votes to 57, but in August the officers and executive committee of the association all resigned. Doran defended his conduct and decided to call a new meeting to appoint new officers.

== Defeat ==
At the 1935 general election, Doran was duly endorsed by the Conservatives to defend his seat. He argued in support of the protective tariffs imposed by the National Government, claiming that the factories built in Tottenham since the tariffs had practically cured the unemployment problem in the borough. However Doran lost the seat by over 8,000 votes. An antisemitic journal called "The Patriot" founded by the Duke of Northumberland later ascribed Doran's loss of his seat to attacks made on him by Conservative Central Office.

Parliament of the United Kingdom
Preceded by Robert Morrison	Member of Parliament for Tottenham North; 1931 – 1935	Succeeded by Robert Morrison
