= Ruislip-Northwood (constituency) =

Parliamentary constituency in the United Kingdom, 1950–2010

Coordinates: 51.589°N 0.435°W

- Former borough constituency for the House of Commons
- Boundary of Ruislip-Northwood in Greater London for the 2005 general election
- County: Greater London

1950–2010
- Seats: One
- Created from: Uxbridge
- Replaced by: Ruislip, Northwood and Pinner, Uxbridge and South Ruislip

Map that gives each named seat and any constant electoral success for national (Westminster) elections for Middlesex, 1955 to 1974.

Ruislip-Northwood was a borough constituency represented in the House of Commons of the UK Parliament from 1950 to 2010 that elected one member (MP) by the first past the post system of election. It was centred on the districts of Ruislip and Northwood in the London Borough of Hillingdon.

The seat returned each of three Conservatives who stood in turn. Its narrowest majority was 17.3% in 1997, over the Labour Party candidate.

== History ==
This represented the northern half of the earlier Uxbridge constituency which was divided into two following house-building in the area in 1950.

Ruislip-Northwood was a constituency that as such covered slightly elevated and gently hilly outskirts of West London, beginning 12 miles (19 km) WNW of Charing Cross.

All three of its successive Members of Parliament were Old Etonians and as the majorities they received were non-marginal, with their contributions the seat was throughout its elections a safe seat.

Almost all of its area has been succeeded by Ruislip, Northwood and Pinner.

== Boundaries ==
1950–1974: The Urban District of Ruislip-Northwood.

1974–1983: The London Borough of Hillingdon wards of Eastcote, Haydon, Manor, Northwood, Ruislip, and South Ruislip.

1983–1997: The London Borough of Hillingdon wards of Bourne, Cavendish, Deansfield, Eastcote, Manor, Northwood, Northwood Hills, Ruislip, and St Martins.

1997–2010: The London Borough of Hillingdon wards of Bourne, Cavendish, Deansfield, Eastcote, Harefield, Manor, Northwood, Northwood Hills, Ruislip, and St Martins.

The constituency consisted of the northern part of the London Borough of Hillingdon.

== Members of Parliament ==
Election	Member	Party
1950	Petre Crowder	Conservative
1979	John Wilkinson	Conservative
2005	Nick Hurd	Conservative
2010	Constituency abolished: see Ruislip, Northwood and Pinner (main successor)	

== Elections ==
=== Elections in the 1950s ===
General election 1950: Ruislip-Northwood
Party	Candidate	Votes	%
Conservative	Petre Crowder	23,077	57.51
Labour	A.L. Birk	13,568	33.81
Liberal	Gwendoline Wood	3,482	8.68
Majority		9,509	23.70
Turnout		40,127	88.05
Conservative win (new seat)			

General election 1951: Ruislip-Northwood
Party	Candidate	Votes	%	±%
Conservative	Petre Crowder	25,295	63.58	
Labour Co-op	Thomas J Parker	14,491	36.42	
Majority		10,804	27.16	
Turnout		39,786	84.62	
Conservative hold		Swing		

General election 1955: Ruislip-Northwood
Party	Candidate	Votes	%	±%
Conservative	Petre Crowder	24,806	65.18	
Labour	George S Burden	13,251	34.82	
Majority		11,555	30.36	
Turnout		38,057	79.79	
Conservative hold		Swing		

General election 1959: Ruislip-Northwood
Party	Candidate	Votes	%	±%
Conservative	Petre Crowder	23,480	56.99	
Labour	James L King	10,424	25.30	
Liberal	Reginald A Walker	7,295	17.71	New
Majority		13,056	31.69	
Turnout		41,199	83.74	
Conservative hold		Swing		

=== Elections in the 1960s ===
General election 1964: Ruislip-Northwood
Party	Candidate	Votes	%	±%
Conservative	Petre Crowder	21,036	52.36	
Labour	Patrick TA Marlowe	11,331	28.21	
Liberal	Reginald A Walker	7,806	19.43	
Majority		9,705	24.15	
Turnout		40,173	81.39	
Conservative hold		Swing		

General election 1966: Ruislip-Northwood
Party	Candidate	Votes	%	±%
Conservative	Petre Crowder	20,731	51.42	
Labour	P.L.N. Smith	13,455	33.38	
Liberal	Reginald A Walker	6,128	15.20	
Majority		7,276	18.04	
Turnout		40,314	81.72	
Conservative hold		Swing		

=== Elections in the 1970s ===
General election 1970: Ruislip-Northwood
Party	Candidate	Votes	%	±%
Conservative	Petre Crowder	24,247	60.65	
Labour	B.H. Silverman	11,541	28.87	
Liberal	Joyce M. Arram	4,188	10.48	
Majority		12,706	31.78	
Turnout		39,976	73.04	
Conservative hold		Swing		

General election February 1974: Ruislip-Northwood
Party	Candidate	Votes	%	±%
Conservative	Petre Crowder	21,995	49.63	
Labour	Reg Race	10,574	23.86	
Liberal	Joyce Arram	10,311	23.27	
Ind. Conservative	W.P. Hobday	1,439	1.14	New
Majority		11,421	25.77	
Turnout		43,338	82.65	
Conservative hold		Swing		

General election October 1974: Ruislip-Northwood
Party	Candidate	Votes	%	±%
Conservative	Petre Crowder	20,779	51.50	
Labour	Reg Race	10,490	26.00	
Liberal	Joyce Arram	8,621	21.37	
United Democratic	W.P. Hobday	458	1.14	New
Majority		10,289	25.50	
Turnout		40,348	74.55	
Conservative hold		Swing		

General election 1979: Ruislip-Northwood
Party	Candidate	Votes	%	±%
Conservative	John Wilkinson	26,748	61.30	
Labour	Michael Lloyd	9,541	21.87	
Liberal	(George) Raymond Stephenson	6,867	15.74	
National Front	Arthur Martin	477	1.09	New
Majority		17,207	39.43	
Turnout		43,633	78.61	
Conservative hold		Swing		

=== Elections in the 1980s ===
General election 1983: Ruislip-Northwood
Party	Candidate	Votes	%	±%
Conservative	John Wilkinson	24,498	59.58	
Liberal	Raymond Stephenson	11,516	28.01	
Labour	Mike O'Brien	5,105	12.42	
Majority		12,982	31.57	
Turnout		41,119	72.93	
Conservative hold		Swing		

General election 1987: Ruislip-Northwood
Party	Candidate	Votes	%	±%
Conservative	John Wilkinson	27,418	62.63	
Liberal	Doreen Darby	10,447	23.86	
Labour	Hazel Smith	5,913	13.51	
Majority		16,971	38.77	
Turnout		43,778	77.67	
Conservative hold		Swing		

=== Elections in the 1990s ===
General election 1992: Ruislip-Northwood
Party	Candidate	Votes	%	±%
Conservative	John Wilkinson	28,097	63.3	+0.7
Labour	RM Brooks	8,306	18.7	+5.2
Liberal Democrats	H Davies	7,739	17.4	−6.5
Natural Law	MG Sheehan	214	0.5	New
Majority		19,791	44.6	+5.8
Turnout		44,356	82.1	+4.4
Conservative hold		Swing	−2.3	

General election 1997: Ruislip-Northwood
Party	Candidate	Votes	%	±%
Conservative	John Wilkinson	22,526	50.2	−12.7
Labour	Paul D. Barker	14,732	32.9	+13.0
Liberal Democrats	Chris D.J. Edwards	7,279	16.2	−0.4
Natural Law	Cherry E. Griffin	296	0.8	+0.3
Majority		7,794	17.3	−25.7
Turnout		44,833	74.2	−7.9
Conservative hold		Swing	−12.8	

=== Elections in the 2000s ===
General election 2001: Ruislip-Northwood
Party	Candidate	Votes	%	±%
Conservative	John Wilkinson	18,115	48.8	−1.4
Labour	Gillian Travers	10,578	28.5	−4.4
Liberal Democrats	Michael Cox	7,177	19.3	+3.1
Green	Graham Lee	724	1.9	New
BNP	Ian Edward	547	1.5	New
Majority		7,537	20.3	+3.0
Turnout		37,141	61.1	−13.1
Conservative hold		Swing		

General election 2005: Ruislip-Northwood
Party	Candidate	Votes	%	±%
Conservative	Nick Hurd	18,939	47.7	−1.1
Liberal Democrats	Michael Cox	10,029	25.3	+6.0
Labour	Ashley D. Riley	8,323	21.0	−7.5
Green	Graham Lee	892	2.2	+0.3
National Front	Ian Edward	841	2.1	New
UKIP	Roland B.S. Courtenay	646	1.6	New
Majority		8,910	22.4	+2.1
Turnout		39,670	65.3	+4.2
Conservative hold		Swing	−3.5	

== See also ==
- List of parliamentary constituencies in London
