= Sir William Prescott, 1st Baronet =

British engineer and Conservative Party politician

Sir William Henry Prescott, 1st Baronet, CBE, DL (1874 – 15 June 1945), was a British engineer and Conservative Party politician.

The son of John Prescott, he initially studied law and was called to the bar at Gray's Inn in 1909. He subsequently took up a career in civil engineering, acting as a consultant to a number of government committees on water supply and roads.

During the First World War he was commanding officer of 222nd Field Company, Royal Engineers, part of the British Expeditionary Force on the Western Front. He was invalided home to the United Kingdom in 1915.

He was elected at the 1918 general election as Coalition Conservative Member of Parliament (MP) for Tottenham North. Unusually for a Conservative, he was sponsored by a trade union, the National Association of Local Government Officers, of which he held membership.

1918 General Election:Tottenham North Electorate 34,463
Party	Candidate	Votes	%	±%
Unionist	Maj. William Henry Prescott	11,891	62.0	
Liberal	Percy Alden	7,293	38.0	
Majority		4,598	24.0	
Turnout			55.7	
Unionist gain from Liberal		Swing		

Prescott stood down at the 1922 election. He was appointed a CBE in 1920 for his role is raising troops in Tottenham and was knighted in 1921. He was also awarded the King Albert Medal by Albert I of Belgium.

A longtime member of Middlesex County Council where he served as an alderman and vice-chairman, he represented the authority on the Metropolitan Water Board (MWB). He was chairman of the MWB from 1928 to 1940, and two massive steam-driven pumping engines at Kempton Park Pumping Station were named "William" and "Bessie" after Prescott and his wife. He co-founded the Tottenham War Services Institute in 1920. He was appointed in 1924 as a Deputy Lieutenant of Middlesex, and in 1929 served as High Sheriff of the county. He was also a member of a number of other committees connected with Middlesex, a member of the Worshipful Company of Paviors and the Worshipful Company of Glaziers and Painters of Glass and a Freeman of the City of London.

Prescott retired to Godmanchester in Huntingdonshire. In the King's Birthday Honours 1938, he was honoured for his work with the water board by being made a baronet, of Godmanchester in the county of Huntingdon. In the same year he served as High Sheriff of Cambridgeshire and Huntingdonshire.

In 1898 he married Bessie Stanley of Ambleside, and they had four children. He died at his Godmanchester home in June 1945 and was succeeded in the baronetcy by his eldest son, Richard Stanley Prescott. His second son, William Robert Stanley Prescott was MP for Darwen.

Parliament of the United Kingdom
New constituency	Member of Parliament for Tottenham North; 1918–1922	Succeeded by Robert Morrison
Baronetage of the United Kingdom
New creation	Baronet (of Godmanchester); 1938–1945	Succeeded by Richard Stanley Prescott
Civic offices
Preceded by Christopher Musgrave	Chairman of the Metropolitan Water Board; 1928–1940	Succeeded by Henry Berry
