= Prescott baronets =

Set index for Prescott baronets

There have been two baronetcies created for persons with the surname Prescott, one in the Baronetage of Great Britain and one in the Baronetage of the United Kingdom. As of 2026 the latter is extant.

- Prescott baronets of Theobald's Park (1794)
- Prescott baronets of Godmanchester (1938)
