= Robert Morrison, 1st Baron Morrison =

British politician (1881–1953)

The Right Honourable The Lord Morrison
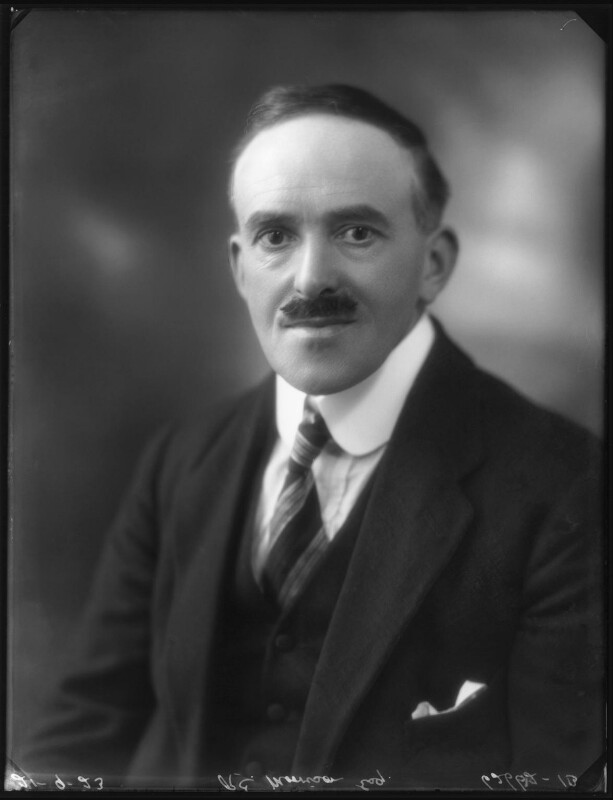
- Robert Morrison in 1923

Member of Parliament for Tottenham North
- In office 1935–1945
- Preceded by: Edward Doran
- Succeeded by: William Irving

Member of Parliament for Tottenham North
- In office 1922–1931
- Preceded by: Sir William Prescott
- Succeeded by: Edward Doran

Parliamentary Private Secretary to the Prime Minister
- In office 1929–1931 Serving with Lauchlan MacNeill Weir
- Prime Minister: Ramsay MacDonald
- Preceded by: Charles Rhys
- Succeeded by: Frank Markham, Ralph Glyn, John Worthington

Personal details
- Born: Robert Craigmyle Morrison; 29 October 1881 Aberdeen
- Died: 25 December 1953 (aged 72) Tottenham
- Party: Labour and Co-operative
- Spouse: Grace Glossop (m. 1910)
- Children: 2
- Occupation: Schoolmaster

Military service
- Allegiance: United Kingdom
- Branch/service: British Army
- Years of service: 1915–1919
- Rank: Private
- Battles/wars: First World War

Robert Craigmyle Morrison, 1st Baron Morrison (29 October 1881 – 25 December 1953) was a British Labour and Co-operative politician.

Born in Aberdeen, he was the son of James Morrison. He originally worked as a schoolmaster in the Middlesex suburbs of North London. He became involved in the Labour and Co-Operative movements, and in 1914 was elected to Wood Green Urban District Council. In the same year war broke out, and he served as a private in the British Army from 1915 to 1919. In 1919 he returned to local politics when he was elected to Middlesex County Council.

At the 1922 general election, he was elected as Member of Parliament (MP) for Tottenham North. He lost his seat at the 1931 general election to the Conservative Edward Doran, but was re-elected at the 1935 general election. After the 1924 general election, he served as Parliamentary Private Secretary to the then Leader of the Opposition Ramsay MacDonald, continuing to serve as Parliamentary Private Secretary to the Prime Minister after MacDonald's elevation to the Premiership.

On 15 November 1945, shortly after he had been re-elected at the 1945 general election, he was ennobled as Baron Morrison, of Tottenham in the County of Middlesex. In 1946, Morrison was appointed as a member of the Anglo-American Committee of Inquiry seeking a policy to resolve the increasing conflict between Jews and Arabs in Palestine. The committee then unanimously recommended a binational state in Palestine.

Morrison married Grace Glossop in 1910, and the couple had two sons. He died in a Tottenham Hospital on Christmas Day 1953, aged 72. His eldest son, Dennis Morrison, inherited his title.

Parliament of the United Kingdom
| Preceded by Sir William Henry Prescott | Member of Parliament for Tottenham North; 1922–1931 | Succeeded by Edward Doran |
| Preceded by Edward Doran | Member of Parliament for Tottenham North; 1935–1945 | Succeeded by William Irving |
Government offices
| Preceded by Charles Rhys | Parliamentary Private Secretary to the Prime Minister; 1929–1931 serving alongside Lauchlan MacNeill Weir | Succeeded by Frank Markham, Ralph Glyn, John Worthington |
Peerage of the United Kingdom
| New creation | Baron Morrison; 1945–1953 | Succeeded by Dennis Morrison |
Political offices
| Preceded by The Lord Westwood | Lord-in-waiting; 1947–1948 | Succeeded by The Lord Shepherd |
