= Petre Crowder =

Frederick Petre Crowder, QC (18 July 1919 – 16 February 1999) was a British Conservative member of parliament and barrister.

Crowder was the son of Sir John Crowder, a Conservative member of parliament and predecessor as MP for Finchley of Margaret Thatcher. He was educated at Eton College and Christ Church, Oxford just as his father was before him. He served in the Coldstream Guards from 1939, in North Africa, Italy and Burma, attaining the rank of Major. He became a barrister, called by Inner Temple in 1948. He was appointed Recorder of Gravesend in 1960, chairman of the Hertfordshire Quarter sessions in 1963 and became Queen's Counsel in 1964.

Crowder contested Tottenham North in a 1945 by-election and was elected as member of parliament for the Conservative safe seat of Ruislip-Northwood in 1950. He served until 1979, preceding John Wilkinson.

On 12 July 1948 Crowder married Patricia Winifred Mary Stourton, daughter of William Stourton, 25th Baron Mowbray, by whom he had two sons.

Parliament of the United Kingdom
New constituency	Member of Parliament for Ruislip-Northwood; 1950 – 1979	Succeeded by John Wilkinson
