= Tottenham North =

Parliamentary constituency in the United Kingdom, 1918–1950

- Former borough constituency for the House of Commons

1918–1950
- Seats: one
- Created from: Tottenham
- Replaced by: Tottenham

Tottenham North was a parliamentary constituency centred on the Municipal Borough of Tottenham, in North London. It returned one Member of Parliament (MP) to the House of Commons of the Parliament of the United Kingdom.

== History ==
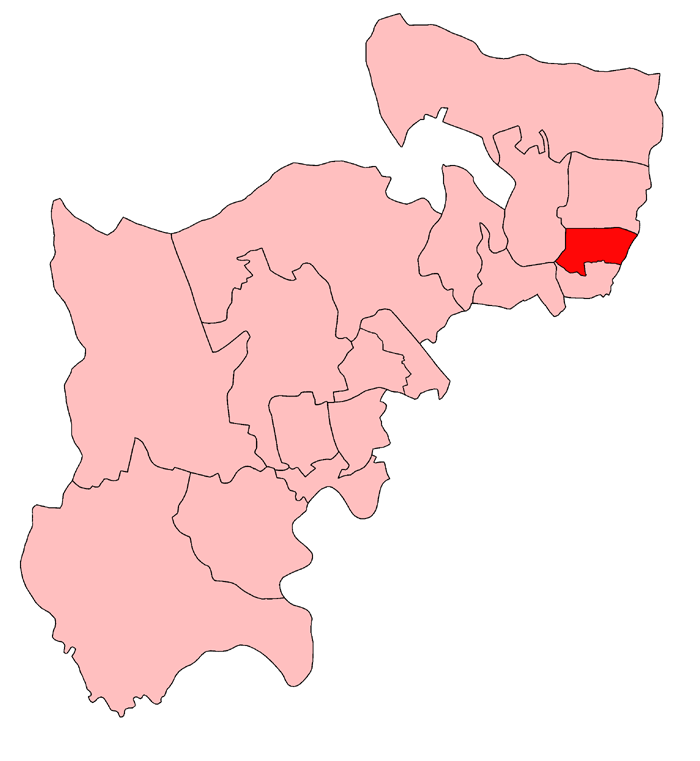
Tottenham North in Middlesex, 1918–1950

The constituency was created for the 1918 general election, and abolished for the 1950 general election.

== Boundaries ==
The Urban District of Tottenham wards of Lower, Middle, and West Green.

== Members of Parliament ==
Year	Member	Whip
1918	William Prescott	Unionist
1922	Robert Morrison	Labour
1931	Edward Doran	Conservative
1935	Robert Morrison	Labour
1945	William Irving	Labour
1950	constituency abolished	

== Election results ==
=== Elections in the 1910s ===
Alden

General election 1918: Tottenham North
Party		Candidate	Votes	%	±%
C	Unionist	William Prescott	11,891	62.0	
	Liberal	Percy Alden	7,293	38.0	
Majority			4,598	24.0	
Turnout			19,184	55.7	
	Unionist win (new seat)				
C indicates candidate endorsed by the coalition government.

=== Elections in the 1920s ===
General election 1922: Tottenham North
Party	Candidate	Votes	%	±%
Labour Co-op	Robert Morrison	10,250	44.2	New
Unionist	Charles David Roberts	8,392	36.1	−25.9
National Liberal	Charles Baker	4,181	18.0	−20.0
Ind. Unionist	Frank Bartle	395	1.7	New
Majority		1,858	8.1	N/A
Turnout		23,218	65.4	+9.7
Labour Co-op gain from Unionist		Swing		

General election 1923: Tottenham North
Party	Candidate	Votes	%	±%
Labour Co-op	Robert Morrison	12,696	49.7	+5.5
Unionist	William Prescott	8,323	32.6	−3.5
Liberal	Oliver Frederick Broadway	4,525	17.7	−0.3
Majority		4,373	17.1	+9.0
Turnout		25,544	69.3	+3.9
Labour Co-op hold		Swing	+4.5	

General election 1924: Tottenham North
Party	Candidate	Votes	%	±%
Labour Co-op	Robert Morrison	13,800	51.0	+1.3
Constitutionalist	John Sturrock	13,243	49.0	New
Majority		557	2.0	−15.1
Turnout		27,043	71.3	+2.0
Labour Co-op hold		Swing		

Holden

General election 1929: Tottenham North
Party	Candidate	Votes	%	±%
Labour Co-op	Robert Morrison	20,884	54.0	+3.0
Unionist	Harold J Soloman	11,231	29.1	New
Liberal	Angus Holden	6,535	16.9	New
Majority		9,653	24.9	+22.9
Turnout		38,650	73.8	+2.5
Labour Co-op hold		Swing		

=== Elections in the 1930s ===
General election 1931: Tottenham North
Party	Candidate	Votes	%	±%
Conservative	Edward Doran	22,172	55.7	+26.6
Labour Co-op	Robert Morrison	17,651	44.3	−9.7
Majority		4,521	11.4	N/A
Turnout		39,823	71.2	−2.6
Conservative gain from Labour Co-op		Swing	+18.1	

General election 1935: Tottenham North
Party	Candidate	Votes	%	±%
Labour Co-op	Robert Morrison	21,075	57.2	+12.9
Conservative	Edward Doran	13,066	35.5	−20.2
Liberal	Leon Charles Augustus Dubery	2,697	7.3	New
Majority		8,009	21.7	N/A
Turnout		36,838	65.9	−5.3
Labour Co-op gain from Conservative		Swing	+16.5	

General Election 1939–40

Another General Election was required to take place before the end of 1940. The political parties had been making preparations for an election to take place and by the Autumn of 1939, the following candidates had been selected;

- Labour Co-operative: Robert Morrison
- Conservative: B Hubert Berry

=== Elections in the 1940s ===
General election 1945: Tottenham North
Party	Candidate	Votes	%	±%
Labour Co-op	Robert Morrison	25,360	71.8	+14.6
Conservative	B Hubert Berry	9,955	28.2	−7.3
Majority		15,405	43.6	+21.9
Turnout		35,315	70.3	+4.4
Labour Co-op hold		Swing	−10.0	

1945 Tottenham North by-election
Party	Candidate	Votes	%	±%
Labour Co-op	William Irving	12,937	63.6	−8.2
Conservative	Petre Crowder	7,415	36.4	+8.2
Majority		5,522	27.2	−16.4
Turnout		20,352	39.5	−30.8
Labour Co-op hold		Swing	-8.2	
