= Baron Morrison =

Extinct barony in the Peerage of the United Kingdom

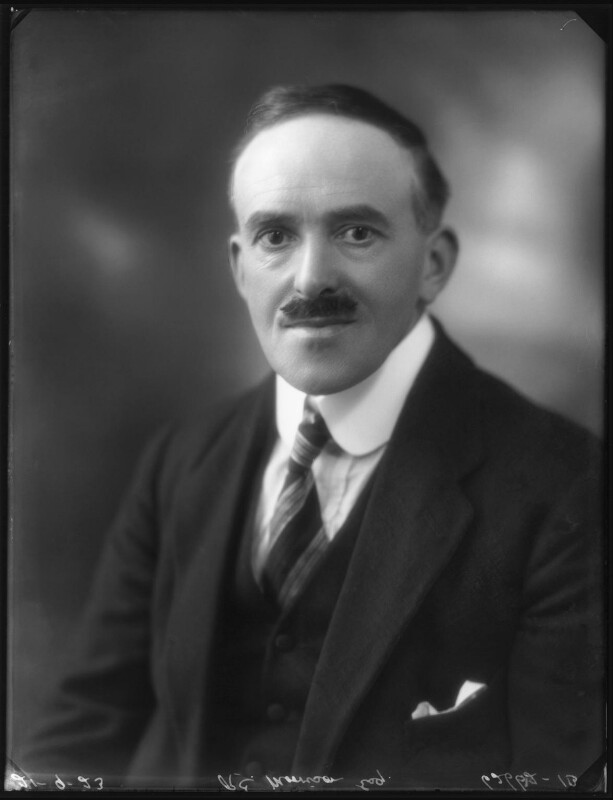
Robert Craigmyle Morrison, 1st Baron Morrison

Baron Morrison, of Tottenham in the County of Middlesex, was a title in the Peerage of the United Kingdom. It was created on 16 November 1945 for the Labour politician Robert Morrison. The title became extinct the death of his son, the second Baron, on 29 October 1997.

== Baron Morrison (1945) ==
- Robert Craigmyle Morrison, 1st Baron Morrison (1881–1953)
- Dennis Glossop Morrison, 2nd Baron Morrison (1914–1997)
