= Labour and Co-operative Party =

British electoral alliance

- Parliamentary group chair: Preet Kaur Gill
- Vice-chair: Ruth Hall
- Founded: 7 June 1927; 99 years ago
- Ideology: Social democracy; Co-operatism
- Political position: Centre-left
- Colours: Red; Purple (customary)
- House of Commons: 43 / 650
- House of Lords: 15 / 796
- Scottish Parliament: 7 / 129
- Senedd: 5 / 96
- London Assembly: 10 / 25
- Local government: 1,600 / 19,698
- PCCs and PFCCs: 15 / 37
- Directly elected mayors: 10 / 25

Labour and Co-operative Party (often abbreviated to Labour Co-op; Welsh: Llafur a'r Blaid Gydweithredol) is a description used by candidates in United Kingdom elections who stand on behalf of both the Labour Party and the Co-operative Party.

Candidates contest elections under an electoral alliance between the two parties, which was first agreed in 1927. This agreement recognises the independence of the two parties and commits them not to stand against each other in elections. It also sets out the procedures for both parties to select joint candidates and collaborate at a local and national level.

There were 43 Labour and Co-operative Party MPs elected at the July 2024 election, making it both the largest number of MPs ever elected under the Labour Co-op banner, and the fourth largest political grouping in the House of Commons, although Labour and Co-operative MPs are generally included in Labour totals. The chair of the Co-operative Parliamentary Group is Preet Kaur Gill; its vice-chair is Ruth Hall. On 20 July 2026, Andy Burnham became the first Labour Co-op prime minister following his leadership victory.

== Description ==
Labour and Co-operative is a joint description registered with the Electoral Commission, appearing alongside a candidate's name on ballot papers. When elected, the designation continues to be Labour and Co-operative Party. Elected representatives belonging to this designation themselves often meet as a group, in addition to being part of an official Labour group; for example, MPs sit as part of the Parliamentary Labour Party but also (together with Labour Co-op members of the House of Lords) are members of the Co-operative Parliamentary Group.

Most Labour and Co-operative candidates use the joint description but some stand under another version, particularly for local government elections and elections in Scotland, Wales and London that use a list system. In this case only one description will be used to avoid voters thinking Labour and Co-operative candidates are standing against Labour candidates; however, joint candidates are still recognised as part of the Labour and Co-operative Group if they are elected.

Labour and Co-operative candidates and representatives also use a joint logo on their printed materials and websites.

== History ==
The Labour Party was founded in February 1900, followed in October 1917 by the Co-operative Party. Initially both parties operated independently, but saw each other as part of a broader movement, appealing to a similar voting base. At a local level, the parties began working together, with informal pacts to stand agreed candidates to maximise the vote for centre-left candidates. The first Co-operative Party MPs also took the whip of the much larger Labour Party upon entering the House of Commons.

Moves toward a formal national partnership began in 1925 with the creation of the 'Joint Committee of the Executive Committees of the Co-operative Party and Labour Party'. This Joint Committee drafted a formal agreement between the two parties that was ratified at the June 1927 Co-operative Congress at Cheltenham, becoming the first 'National Agreement', also known as the 'Cheltenham Agreement'.

The agreement was updated a number of times throughout the twentieth century, deepening the partnership between the two parties and gradually removing restrictions that formed part of earlier versions, such as a limit on the number of joint candidates in elections. The most recent National Agreement was signed in 2003 and sets out the process for selecting candidates and how the two parties can work together locally and nationally.

On 20 July 2026, Andy Burnham became the first Labour Co-op prime minister following his leadership victory.

== See also ==
- List of Labour and Co-operative Party MPs
