= Woman in Science =

Book by John Augustine Zahm

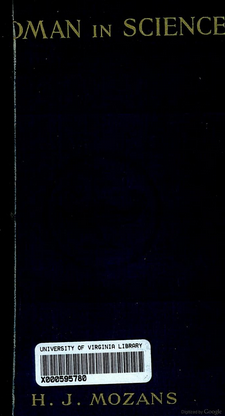
- The original 1913 cover of the book, "Woman in Science"
- Author: H. J. Mozans
- Publication date: 1913
- Pages: 427

Woman in Science is a book written by John Augustine Zahm (under the pen name H. J. Mozans) in 1913. It is an account of women who have contributed to the sciences, up to the time when it was published.

== Themes ==
The comprehensive theme that is depicted throughout Woman in Science is that of women's equal biological capacity. It is asserted that women being less prominent than men in science is due to the lack of educational and career opportunities available rather than the biological aspects of brain size or structure. In addition, the book encompasses the many developments of science throughout history. The main objective of the author/book was for women to become more involved and gain a respected position in the scientific field, in addition to increasing educational and career opportunities for women interested in science. It was one of the first collaborations of women's contributions to the scientific community, and it "explored the barriers to women's participation in science."

== Quotations ==
"H. J. Mozans, in his Woman in Science, gives us a most comprehensive survey of the scientific activity and attainments of women. Primarily inspired to his investigation by extensive travels in Greece and Italy, the author begins with the learned women of ancient Greece-Hypatia, Sappho, and Aspasea, and of somewhat less widespread fame, Gorgo, Andromeda, and Corinna-and passes on from them to the women of ancient Rome, the women of the Middle Ages, when education was largely confined to monasteries, the women of the renaissance, and the women of subsequent and modern times. He shows during each of these epochs the advantages and opportunities offered to women in each country, and indicates where their achievements were least, and where greatest. He very conclusively proves that where opportunity was great, achievement was likewise great, and vice versa. "In every department of natural knowledge," he states, "when not inhibited by her environment, woman has been the colleague and the emulatress, if not the peer, of the most illustrious men who have contributed to the increase and diffusion of human learning." He analyzes most carefully the biologic capacity of women for scientific pursuits, coming to the conclusion that the reputed difference in intelligence between men and women is due not to difference in brain size or structure or innate power of intellect, but to education and opportunity. He then goes carefully through the historical development of each science, beginning with mathematics, going on through astronomy, physics, chemistry, the natural sciences, medicine, and surgery, archaeology, and invention, and shows the instances, extent and value of woman's contributions to each science. He concludes with the prediction that increasing education and opportunity for women will bring about ever-increasing participation in the advancement of science."

— Nellie Seeds Nearing, wife of Scott Nearing

PREFACE

"Only then did the magnitude and the difficulty of my self-imposed task begin to dawn upon me. I saw that it would be impossible, if I were to do justice to the subject, to compass in a single volume anything like an adequate account of the contributions of women to the advancement of general knowledge. I accordingly resolved to restrict my theme and confine myself to an attempt to show what an important role women have played in the development of those branches of knowledge in which they are usually thought to have had but little part".

"The subject of my book thus, by a process of elimination, narrowed its scope to woman’s achievements in science. Many works in various languages had been written on what women had accomplished in art, literature, and state-craft, and there was, therefore, no special call for a new volume on any of these topics. But, with the exception of a few brief monographs in German, French and Italian, and an occasional magazine article here and there, practically nothing had been written about woman in science. The time, then, seemed opportune for entering upon a field that had thus far been almost completely neglected; and, although I soon discovered that the labor involved would be far greater than I had anticipated, I never lost sight of the work which had its virtual inception in the peerless sanctuary of Pallas Athena in the 'City of the Violet Crown.'"

== Chapters in the book ==
- I:Woman's Long Struggle for Things of the Mind
- II: Woman's Capacity for Scientific Pursuit
- III: Woman in Mathematics
- IV: Woman in Astronomy
- V: Woman in Physics
- VI: Woman in Chemistry
- VII: Woman in Natural Sciences
- VIII: Woman in Medicine and Surgery
- IX: Woman in Archaeology
- X: Woman in Invention
- XI: Woman as Inspirers and Collaborators in Science
- XII: The Future of Woman in Science: Summary and Epilogue

== Women chronicled in the book ==
The biographies include, but are not limited to, the following women, by chapter:

1. Cornelia, Aurelia, Porcia, Servilia, Madame du Deffand, Elizabeth Barrett Browning
2. Christine de Pizan, Sonya Kovalevsky, Dr. Mary Putnam Jacobi, Mrs. Henry Fawcett
3. Hypatia, Maria Gaetana Agnesi, Empress Maria Theresa
4. Caroline Herschel, Mme. Lepaute, Mme. Du Pierry, Duchesse Louise
5. Laura Bassi, Mary Somerville, Mrs. Ayrton
6. Mme. Lavoisier, Ms. Ellen Swallow/Richards, Marie Curie
7. Anna Manzolini, Mdm de Beausoleil, Maria Sibylla Merian
8. Bitisia Gozzadina, Maria Vittoria Dosi, Bettina Calendrini and Norella Calendrini, Elizabeth Blackwell
9. Elisabetta Gonzaga, Isabella d'Este, Anna Murphy, Alice Cunningham Fletcher, Zelia Nuttall, Agnes Smith Lewis and Margaret Dunlop Gibson
10. Mary Kies, Sarah Mather, Margaret Knight
11. Caroline Herschel, Elizabeth Agassiz, Lady Baker, Marie Aimee, Sophia Charlotte, Queen Christina of Sweden, Sister Celeste
12. Even Portia, Étienne Lamy, Mme. Curie, Mme. Coudreau, Mary Kingsley, Harriet Boyd Hawes, Donna Eersilia Bovatillo, Sophie Pereyaslawewa
