= Ayrton =

Ayrton (/ˈɛərtən/ AIR-tən) is a given name and surname. Notable people with the name include:

== Given name ==
- Ayrton Azzopardi (born 1993), Maltese footballer
- Ayrton Badovini (born 1986), Italian motorcycle racer
- Ayrton Cable (born 2003), Slovak social activist
- Ayrton Cicilia (born 2001), Bonaire footballer
- Ayrton Costa (born 1999), Argentine footballer
- Ayrton De Pauw (born 1998), Belgian racing cyclist
- Ayrton Fagundes (1937–1994), Brazilian broadcast journalist
- Ayrton Ganino (born 1985), Brazilian footballer
- Ayrton Lucas (born 1997), Brazilian footballer
- Ayrton Martino (born 2002), Canadian ice hockey player
- Ayrton Mboko (born 1997), Belgian footballer
- Ayrton Moreira (1917–1975), Brazilian football player
- Ayrton Páez (born 1995), Venezuelan professional footballer
- Ayrton Preciado (born 1994), Ecuadorian soccer player
- Ayrton Ribeiro (born 1997), Portuguese footballer
- Ayrton Sánchez (born 2000), Argentine footballer
- Ayrton Senna (1960–1994), Brazilian racing driver and three-time Formula One world champion
- Ayrton Simmons (born 2001), British racing driver
- Ayrton Statie (born 1994), Bonaire professional footballer
- Ayrton Sweeney (born 1993), South African swimmer
- Ayrton Pinheiro Victor (born 1994), Brazilian footballer

== Surname ==
- Acton Smee Ayrton (1816–1886), British Liberal politician, uncle of William Edward Ayrton
- Barbara Ayrton-Gould (c. 1886 – 1950), a Labour politician in the United Kingdom
- Edith Ayrton (1879–1945), British writer and activist
- Edmund Ayrton (1734–1808), English organist
- Edward R. Ayrton (1882–1914), British Egyptologist
- Hertha Marks Ayrton (1854–1923), British mathematician and physicist, second wife of William Edward Ayrton
- Norman Ayrton (1924–2017), English actor, director, and theatre instructor
- Matilda Chaplin Ayrton (1846–1883), doctor of medicine, first wife of William Edward Ayrton
- Maxwell Ayrton (1874–1960), Scottish architect
- Michael Ayrton (1921–1975), British artist
- Randle Ayrton (1869–1940), British actor, producer and director
- William Edward Ayrton (1847–1908), British physicist who taught in Japan

=== In fiction ===
- Tom Ayrton, character in Jules Verne's novels In Search of the Castaways and The Mysterious Island

== See also ==
- Ayrton Drugs, a Ghanaian pharmaceuticals company
- Airton (given name)
