= Fagundes =

Fagundes is a surname, and may refer to:

- Antônio Fagundes (born 1949), Brazilian actor
- Ayrton Fagundes (1937–1994), Brazilian broadcast journalist
- Bruno Fagundes (born 1989), Brazilian actor
- Catarina Fagundes (born 1977), Portuguese Olympic athlete
- João Álvares Fagundes (d. 1522), Portuguese explorer
- Lygia Fagundes Telles (1918–2022), Brazilian novelist
- Sálvio Fagundes (born 1968), Brazilian referee
- Wellington Fagundes (born 1957), Brazilian veterinarian and politician

== Other uses ==
- Fagundes, Paraíba, a municipality in northeast Brazil
