= Quebra–Quilos revolt =

Opposition to the transition to the metric system in Brazil

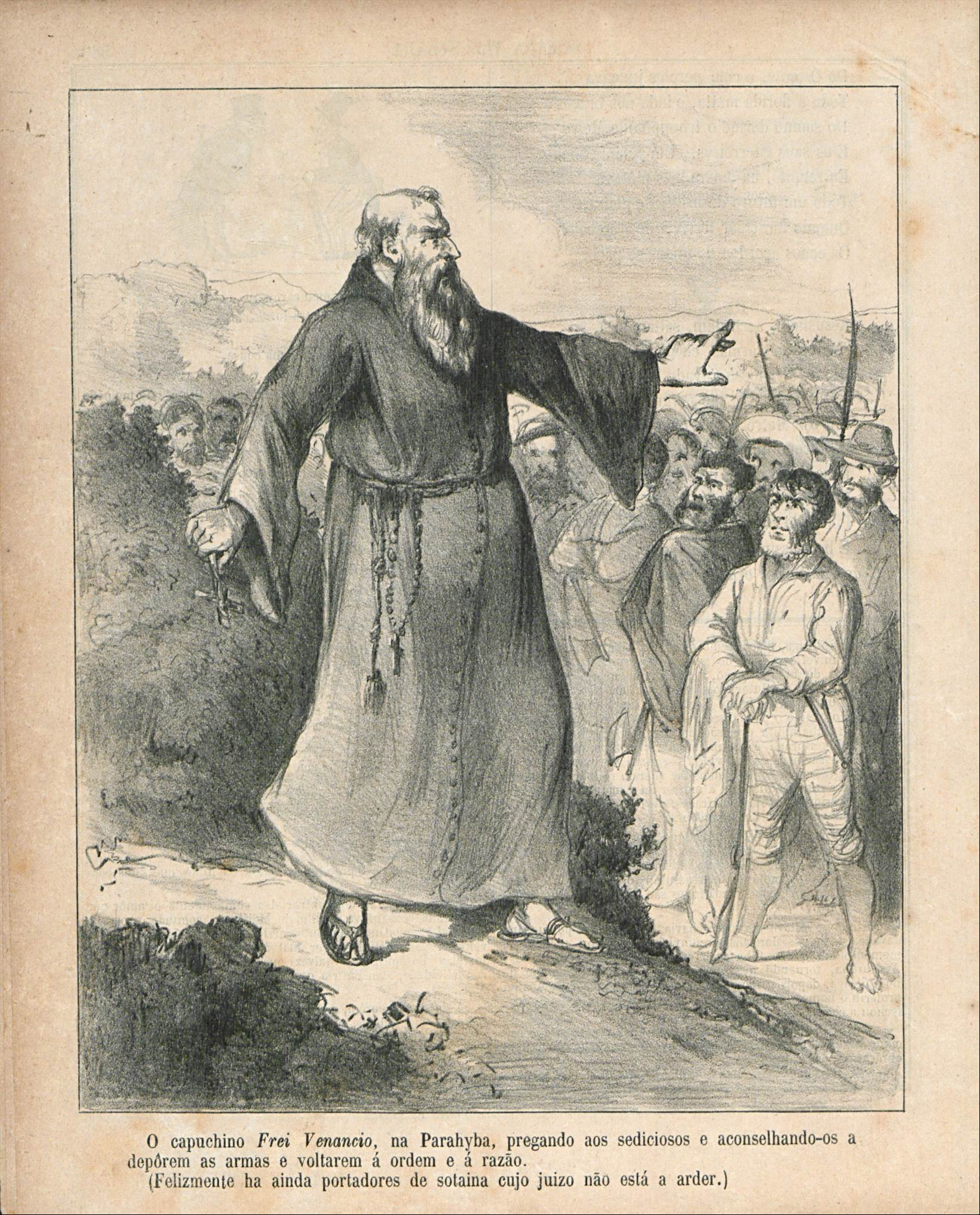
- "The Capuchin Friar Venancio, in Parahyba, preaching to the seditious and advising them to lay down their arms and return to order and reason." Illustration by Henrique Fleiuss published in Semana Illustrada, no. 730, 6 December 1874
| Date | 31 October 1874 – January 1875 |
| Location | Northeastern Brazil |
| Result | Suppression of the revolt |

Belligerents
| Rebels | Empire of Brazil |

Commanders and leaders
| João Carga d'Água | Pedro de Alcântara Tibério Capistrano |

Strength
| 1,500–2,000 | 84 soldiers 100 militia |

Casualties and losses
| 1 killed | 12 killed 3 wounded |

The Quebra–Quilos revolt (Portuguese: revolta do Quebra-Quilos, literally, "revolt of the kilogram-breaker") was a three-month-long revolt in opposition to the proposed transition to the metric system in Brazil. The unrest took place from 31 October 1874 to January 1875 as part of wider anti-government protests.

== Background ==
The metric system was first introduced in Brazil in 1862 as a rebellion against the monopoly established by foreign merchants. Slaves took part on occasions demanding emancipation. Through January the revolt died on its own, without any drastic intervention by the army. The spread of the revolt led to involvement of groups with different goals, such as slaves demanding emancipation, anti masonic clergy and conscientious objectors.

The revolt was caused by the implementation of a variety of provincial and municipal taxes, that rendered goods unaffordable for a large portion of the population. The adoption of the metric system further increased prices, as merchants seized the opportunity to manipulate the prices, draft resistance also played a role in increasing tensions. Religion played a role in the uprising as the rebels often assembled in churches, praying before the patron saints before launching their raids, the rebel flag depicted effigies of the Virgin Mary and Christ on the Cross. The insurgents lacked central leadership, instead being led by local commanders who usually commanded small bands.

== Revolt ==
On 31 October 1874, a marketplace in Fagundes, Paraíba was disturbed by the shouts of a group of people protesting the imposition of market taxes, requiring them to pay 200 reis for every quantity of purchased goods touching the ground. The protestors banished a local tax collector from the market, tearing down lists of municipal taxes. The peasants then pursued to destroy scales and measurements representing the metric system, as their use was also subject to taxation. Fagundese citizens and their supporters from the neighboring areas continued to resist taxation organising riots on 7 and 14 November, the intervention of the district judge and vicar failed to bring any results.

On 21 November, a band of 800 armed men attacked the town of Ingá, burning the archives of the town's council and destroying all records related to taxation, later forcing a police commander to sign a declaration cancelling all the new taxes. Unrest spread through the region affecting the towns of Campina Grande, Alagoa Grande, Alagôia Nova, Arara, Areia, Bananeiras, Espalhada and Independencia among others. On the same day the towns of Timbaúba and Itambé, Bahia, Pernambuco were targeted by the rebels, prompting provincial president Lucena to send a force of 40 regular troops to the destroyed towns on 27 November. The troops under the command of Pedro de Alcântara Tibério Capistrano, reached Itambé three days later but were ordered to remain inactive by the district judge. On 7 December, the troops patrolled the Itambé market, enabling officials to collect taxes. The deployment of soldiers proved insufficient, as riots resumed the following week engulfing Angelica, Alliança, Caruarú and Vicencia. A 400-man mob left Caruarú, marching to Bezerros and Bonita on 12 December and intimidating the local authorities.

Provincial president Lucena then reacted by dispatching a second force consisting of 40 national guardsmen and 20 regular troops. On 19 December, the rebels encountered the soldiers while raiding the house of the Bonita taxman. The two sides clashed, leaving one rebel and two soldiers dead and over three people wounded. News of the confrontation reached a nearby prison, with 10 prison guards and 4 soldiers reaching the destroyed house and repelling the mob. Rumors of a new tax to be imposed on combing one's hair led to the spread of the riots to the province of Alagoas, mobs broke scales, burned taxation and army recruitment documents, while ridiculing the police. Loyalist militias were summoned in several locations disrupting the riots.

The last major violent incident within the borders of Pernambuco took place on 25 December, when 500 rebels raided the house of a judge in Villa Bella, failing however to find any documents. On 3 January 1875, a group of merchants from Quebrangulo, Rio Grande do Norte unsuccessfully resisted the rebels who in turn killed 10 and injured many more of the traders.

== See also ==
- Rebellions and revolutions in Brazil
