= Michael Pinto-Duschinsky =

Hungarian-born British political consultant and writer

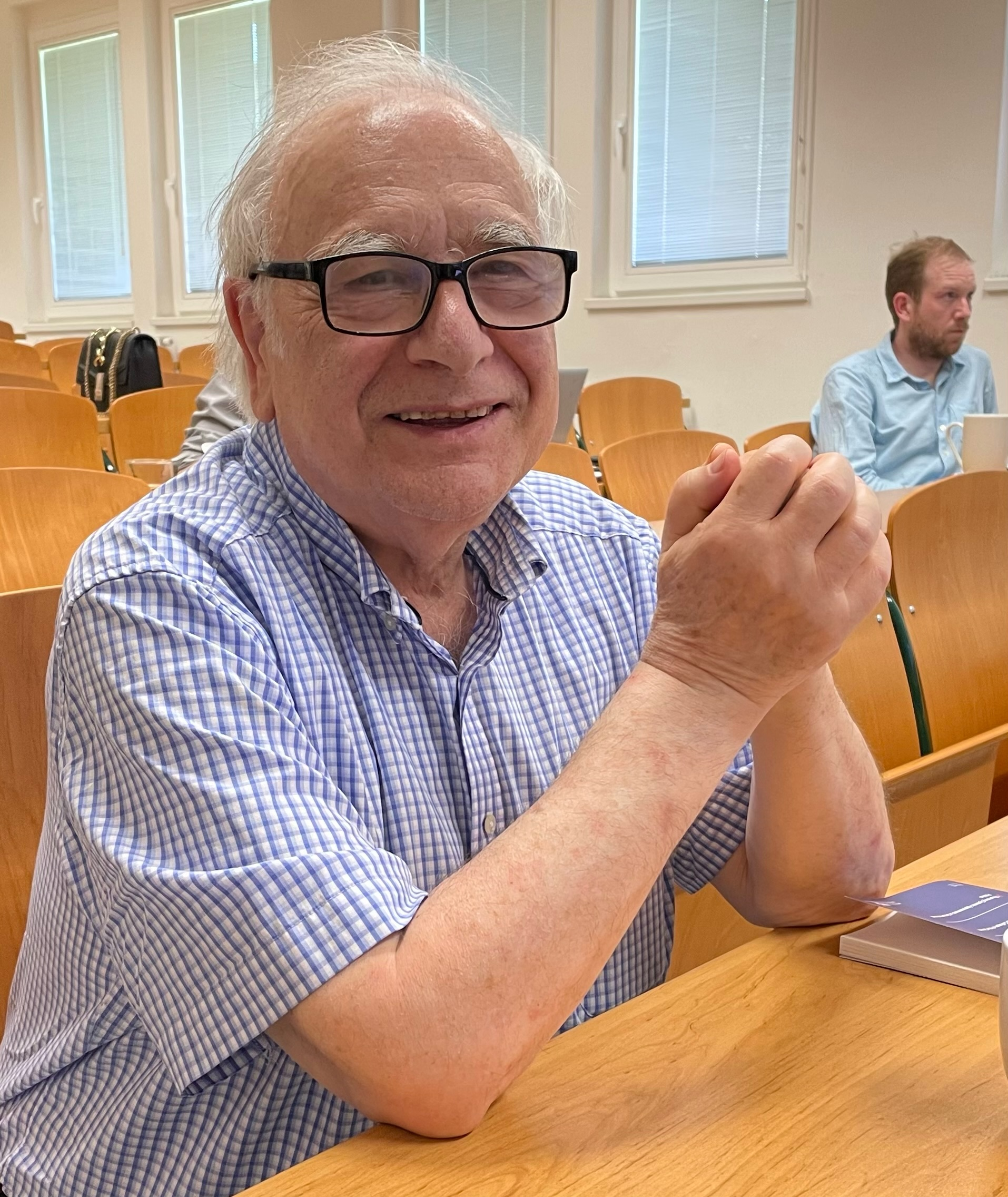
- Pinto-Duschinsky in 2022
- Born: June 1943 (age 83); Hungary
- Education: University of Oxford
- Occupations: Political consultant and writer

Michael Pinto-Duschinsky (born June 1943) is a Hungarian-born British scholar, political consultant and writer. The Times called his work "authoritative". Pinto-Duschinsky, who is considered a "prominent author", has written for The Times and other outlets. The Guardian, The BBC, The Times, The Financial Times and the Daily Express have published his views on a number of issues.

== Early life and family ==
Michael Pinto-Duschinsky was born in Hungary in June 1943, son of Eugene Duschinsky, rabbi (Av Beit Din) of Cape Town, South Africa, of a family that had been rabbis for seven generations. He graduated from Pembroke College, Oxford with first class honours in Philosophy, Politics and Economics and subsequently earned an MA in government at Cornell University and a D.Phil. in politics at Oxford. He was a Fulbright Scholar at Cornell and at Nuffield College, Oxford.

== Career ==
In the 1970s, he was a member of the Oxford City Council and a fellow in politics at Merton College and Pembroke College, Oxford.

Since 2012, Pinto-Duschinsky has been the senior consultant on constitutional affairs for the right-wing think-tank Policy Exchange. He has had a variety of positions advising organisations and governments on constitutional reform, the promotion of democracy, anti-corruption policies, and the funding of political parties and elections. He has been a senior research fellow at Brunel University.

In 2011–12, he was a member of the Commission on a Bill of Rights set up by the UK Coalition Government in 2010 to advise on reform of the 1998 Human Rights Act. In March 2012, he resigned after complaining that his views were being ignored.

Pinto-Duschinsky was a frequent contributor to the debate following the 2014 Lutfur Rahman voting affair, and estimated that there were over 6.5 million "ghost voters" in the electoral register.

At least since 2006, Pinto-Duschinsky has been the president of the International Political Science Association's Political Finance and Corruption research committee.

Since 2019, he has regularly published in The Article.

== Personal life ==
Pinto-Duschinsky married Shelley, the daughter of Dr Jerome David Markham; she, an educator, had graduated from Westhampton College, University of Richmond, and received a master of education degree from Harvard in 1969. Their son, David, is a Labour politician and the Member of Parliament for Hendon since 2024. He was previously a management consultant, and former special adviser to former Chancellor of the Exchequer, Alistair Darling. David is a former President of the Oxford Union and was the unsuccessful Labour parliamentary candidate for then-Chancellor of the Exchequer George Osborne's constituency of Tatton in 2015 and contested Hendon in 2019, where he finished in second place. David then re-contested Hendon in the 2024 United Kingdom general election, which he won.

== Selected publications ==
=== Articles and chapters ===
- "Central Office and ‘Power’ in the Conservative Party" in Political Studies, Vol. 20 (1972), No. 1, pp. 1–16. DOI: Central Office and ‘Power’ in the Conservative Party
- "Send the rascals packing: Defects of proportional representation and the virtues of the Westminster model", Times Literary Supplement, 25 September 1998.
- "Fund-raising and the Holocaust: The Case of Dr Gert-Rudolf Flick's Contribution to Oxford University" in Alan Montefiore & David Vines (eds.) Integrity in the Public and Private Domains. Routledge, London, 2005. ISBN 978-1-134-67938-6.

=== Books ===
- The Political Thought of Lord Salisbury, 1854–1868. Constable, London, 1967.
- The British General Election of 1970. Macmillan, London, 1971. (With David Butler) ISBN 0333121422
- British Political Finance, 1830–1980. American Enterprise Institute for Public Policy Research, Washington D.C., 1981. ISBN 0844734527
- Voter Registration in England and Wales: Problems and Solutions. Constitutional Reform Centre, London, 1987. (With Shelley Pinto-Duschinsky)
- Paying for the Party: Myths and Realities in British Political Finance. Policy Exchange, London, 2008. (With Roger Gough) ISBN 9781906097233
- Bringing Rights Back Home: Making human rights compatible with parliamentary democracy in the UK. Policy Exchange, London, 2011. ISBN 9781906097950
- Electoral Omission. Policy Exchange, London, 2014.
