= John Gorst =

John Gorst may refer to:

- John Eldon Gorst (1835–1916), Conservative politician
- John Gorst (Hendon North MP) (1928–2010), Conservative MP for Hendon North 1970–1997
