= Kenneth Graham Jupp =

British Judge and Liberal Party politician

Sir Kenneth Graham Jupp, MC (2 June 1917 – 15 March 2004) styled The Honourable Mr Justice Jupp was a British Judge and a Liberal Party politician.

== Early life and education ==
Jupp was the son of Albert Leonard and Marguerite Isabel Jupp. He was educated at The Perse School in Cambridge and at University College, Oxford. At Oxford in 1936 he was a senior classical scholar of University College and captain of the boats. In 1938 he graduated with 1st Class Honours in Mods in Classics. In 1939 he was awarded the College Prize for Greek. In 1939 he avoided Finals by joining the Army. He returned in 1945 to complete a Master of Arts, Oxon (War Degree).

== Military service ==
Jupp joined the Army in 1939 and served with the Royal Artillery in France (where he escaped from Dunkirk), and in North Africa and Italy, being wounded at the Battle of Anzio. In 1943 he received the Military Cross (MC). From 1943-46 he worked for the War Office Selection Board.

== Legal career ==
In 1945 Jupp was Call to the bar by Lincoln's Inn. He was a barrister practising on the South-Eastern Circuit and a lecturer on economics. In 1966 he became a QC. In 1973 he became a Bencher.

Jupp was a High Court Judge of the Queen's Bench Division from 1975 to 1990. Jupp received the customary knighthood on his appointment to the High Court in 1975.

== Political career ==
Jupp was Liberal candidate for Canterbury at the 1950 General Election. Canterbury was not a promising seat for the Liberals who had not had a candidate there since 1929. In a difficult election for the Liberals, he came third. At the 1951 general election he stood in Hendon North, again finishing third. He did not stand for parliament again.

General Election 1950: Canterbury
Party	Candidate	Votes	%	±%
Conservative	John Baker White	26,491	55.9	
Labour	Jackson Newman	14,563	30.8	
Liberal	Kenneth Graham Jupp	6,296	13.3	
Majority		11,928	25.2	
Turnout			82.5	
Conservative hold		Swing		

General election 1951: Hendon North
Party	Candidate	Votes	%	±%
Conservative	Sir Charles Ian Orr-Ewing	23,329	49.23	
Labour	Finlay Rea	20,738	43.76	
Liberal	Kenneth Graham Jupp	3,319	7.00	
Majority		2,591	5.47	
Turnout		47,386	86.28	
Conservative hold		Swing		

== Marriage and children ==
In 1947 Jupp married Kathleen Elizabeth Richards. They had two sons and two daughters.

== Arms ==
Coat of arms of Kenneth Graham Jupp

Motto
Claim Nothing
