= Hendon North =

Parliamentary constituency in the United Kingdom, 1945-1997

Coordinates: 51.62°N 0.25°W

- Former borough constituency for the House of Commons
- County: Greater London
- Electorate: 51,514 (1992)

1945–1997
- Seats: One
- Created from: Hendon
- Replaced by: Hendon

Hendon North was a constituency in the former Municipal Borough of Hendon (later subsumed into the London Borough of Barnet) which returned one Member of Parliament (MP) to the House of Commons of the Parliament of the United Kingdom. It was created for the 1945 general election as the existing Hendon constituency was too large (the estimated electorate in 1941 was 217,900), and lasted until the 1997 general election when the London Borough of Barnet's Parliamentary representation was reduced from four seats to three.

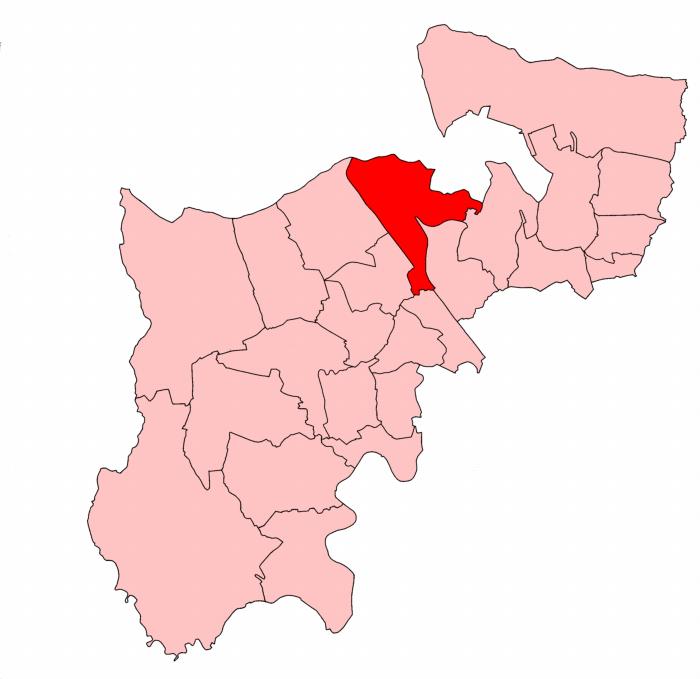
Hendon North constituency within the parliamentary county of Middlesex, showing boundaries used from 1945 to 1974

Map that gives each named seat and any constant electoral success for national (Westminster) elections for Middlesex, 1955 to 1974.

== Boundaries ==
1945–1974: The Municipal Borough of Hendon wards of Burnt Oak, Edgware, Mill Hill, and West Hendon.

1974–1997: The London Borough of Barnet wards of Burnt Oak, Colindale, Edgware, Hale, and Mill Hill.

== Members of Parliament ==
Election	Member	Party	Notes
1945	Barbara Ayrton-Gould	Labour	
1950	Ian Orr-Ewing	Conservative	
1970	John Gorst	Conservative	Contested Hendon following redistribution
1997	constituency abolished: see Hendon		

== Elections ==
=== Elections in the 1990s ===
General election 1992: Hendon North
Party	Candidate	Votes	%	±%
Conservative	John Gorst	20,569	53.2	−2.4
Labour	D Hill	13,447	34.8	+9.3
Liberal Democrats	P Kemp	4,136	10.7	−8.2
Green	P Duncan	430	1.1	New
Natural Law	P Orr	95	0.2	New
Majority		7,122	18.4	−11.7
Turnout		38,677	75.1	+9.3
Conservative hold		Swing		

=== Elections in the 1980s ===
General election 1987: Hendon North
Party	Candidate	Votes	%	±%
Conservative	John Gorst	20,155	55.6	+6.7
Labour	Jenny Manson	9,223	25.5	+1.8
SDP	Elisabeth Jean Davies	6,859	18.9	−6.7
Majority		10,932	30.1	+5.8
Turnout		36,237	65.8	+2.2
Conservative hold		Swing		

General election 1983: Hendon North
Party	Candidate	Votes	%	±%
Conservative	John Gorst	18,499	49.9	−2.2
SDP	Kenneth Craig	9,474	25.6	N/A
Labour	Tony Williams	8,786	23.7	−12.3
Nationalist Party	Bernard Franklin	194	0.5	N/A
Independent	R Clayton	116	0.3	New
Majority		9,025	24.3	+8.2
Turnout		37,068	68.0	−5.8
Conservative hold		Swing		

=== Elections in the 1970s ===
General election 1979: Hendon North
Party	Candidate	Votes	%	±%
Conservative	John Gorst	20,766	52.1	+7.6
Labour	Frank Arthur Cooper	14,374	36.0	−3.7
Liberal	Christopher Perkin	4,113	10.3	−5.6
National Front	Bernard Franklyn	638	1.6	New
Majority		6,392	16.1	+11.3
Turnout		39,891	73.8	+1.6
Conservative hold		Swing		

General election October 1974: Hendon North
Party	Candidate	Votes	%	±%
Conservative	John Gorst	16,299	44.55	
Labour	John Stanley Champion	14,549	39.68	
Liberal	I Senior	5,822	15.88	
Majority		1,750	4.77	
Turnout		36,670	72.24	
Conservative hold		Swing	-0.79	

General election February 1974: Hendon North
Party	Candidate	Votes	%	±%
Conservative	John Gorst	17,285	42.63	
Labour	John Stanley Champion	14,673	36.19	
Liberal	David Edwards	8,585	6.44	
Majority		2,612	6.44	
Turnout		31,958	80.91	
Conservative hold		Swing	-1.1	

General election 1970: Hendon North
Party	Candidate	Votes	%	±%
Conservative	John Gorst	18,192	49.3	+2.9
Labour	Derry Irvine	15,013	40.7	−4.1
Liberal	Gerald Cass	3,704	10.0	+1.2
Majority		3,179	8.6	+7.1
Turnout		36,909	70.9	−9.1
Conservative hold		Swing		

=== Elections in the 1960s ===
General election 1966: Hendon North
Party	Candidate	Votes	%	±%
Conservative	Ian Orr-Ewing	18,468	46.36	
Labour	Ernest Wistrich	17,868	44.85	
Liberal	Gerald Cass	3,503	8.79	
Majority		600	1.51	
Turnout		39,839	80.02	
Conservative hold		Swing		

General election 1964: Hendon North
Party	Candidate	Votes	%	±%
Conservative	Ian Orr-Ewing	17,784	44.3	−6.5
Labour	Alan Jinkinson	16,660	41.5	+3.0
Liberal	John Holmes	5,719	14.2	+3.5
Majority		1,124	2.8	−9.6
Turnout		40,163		
Conservative hold		Swing		

=== Elections in the 1950s ===
General election 1959: Hendon North
Party	Candidate	Votes	%	±%
Conservative	Ian Orr-Ewing	21,898	50.85	
Labour Co-op	Cecil Genese	16,566	38.47	
Liberal	Lady Hills	4,598	10.68	
Majority		5,332	12.38	
Turnout		43,062	81.67	
Conservative hold		Swing		

General election 1955: Hendon North
Party	Candidate	Votes	%	±%
Conservative	Ian Orr-Ewing	21,934	50.69	
Labour	Elizabeth Monkhouse	17,874	41.30	
Liberal	Donald Barrington-Hudson	3,467	8.01	
Majority		4,060	9.39	
Turnout		43,275	80.66	
Conservative hold		Swing		

General election 1951: Hendon North
Party	Candidate	Votes	%	±%
Conservative	Ian Orr-Ewing	23,329	49.23	
Labour	Finlay Rea	20,738	43.76	
Liberal	Kenneth Jupp	3,319	7.00	
Majority		2,591	5.47	
Turnout		47,386	86.28	
Conservative hold		Swing		

General election 1950: Hendon North
Party	Candidate	Votes	%	±%
Conservative	Ian Orr-Ewing	20,755	44.4	+8.9
Labour	Barbara Ayrton-Gould	18,500	39.6	−8.0
Liberal	Edward Martell	6,575	14.1	−2.8
Communist	Marjorie Pollitt	918	2.0	New
Majority		2,225	4.8	N/A
Turnout		46,748	86.3	+11.2
Conservative gain from Labour		Swing		

=== Elections in the 1940s ===
General election 1945: Hendon North
Party	Candidate	Votes	%
Labour	Barbara Ayrton-Gould	18,251	47.61
Conservative	Edwin Flavell	13,607	35.49
Liberal	Frederic Sellers	6,478	16.90
Majority		4,644	12.12
Turnout		38,336	75.09
Registered electors			
Labour win (new seat)			
