= Matthew Offord =

British Conservative politician (born 1969)

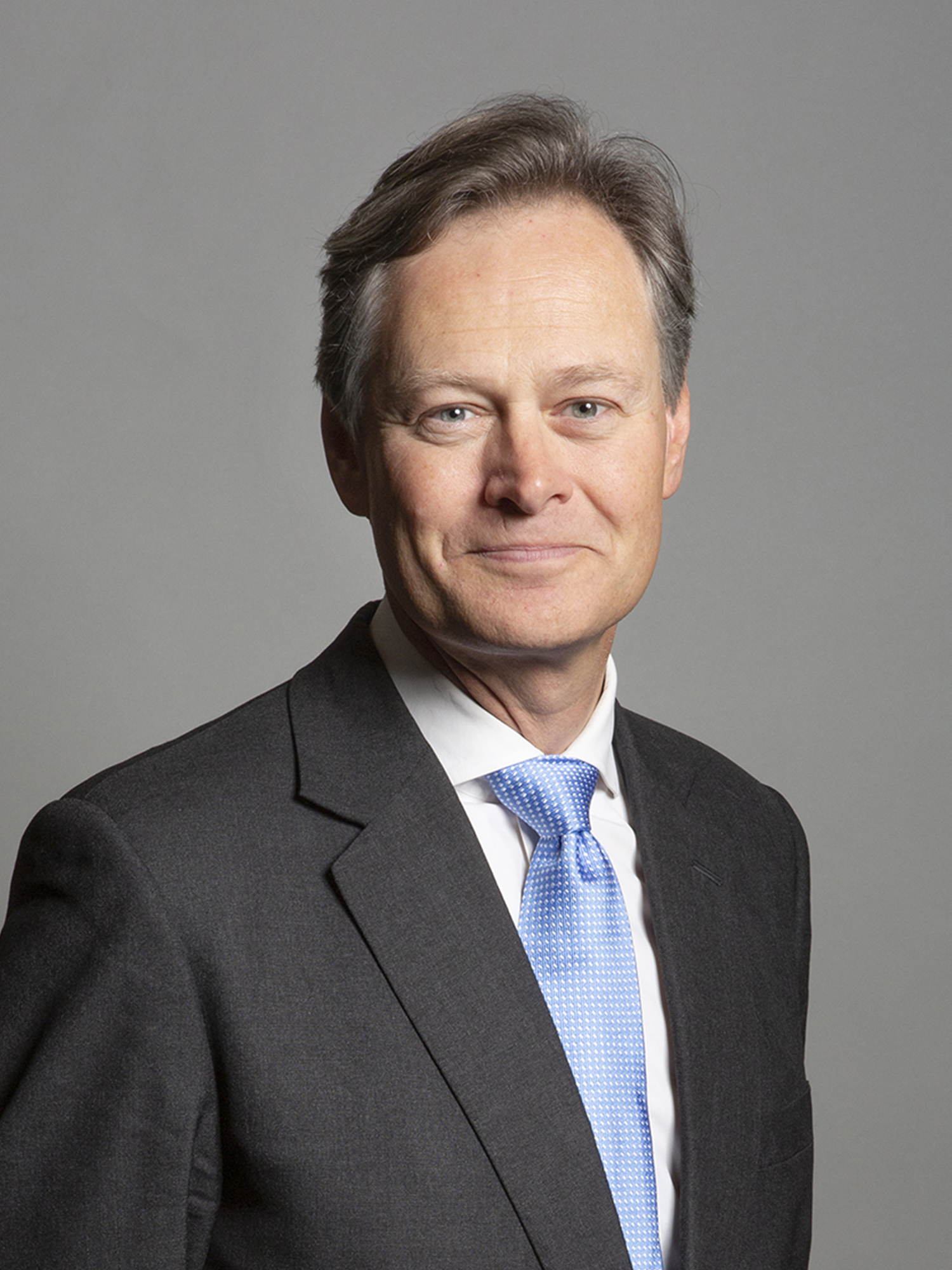
- Official portrait, 2019

Member of Parliament for Hendon
- In office 6 May 2010 – 30 May 2024
- Preceded by: Andrew Dismore
- Succeeded by: David Pinto-Duschinsky

Personal details
- Born: Matthew James Offord; 3 September 1969 (age 56) Alton, Hampshire, England
- Party: Conservative
- Spouse: 2010 (m. 2018, divorced)
- Education: Nottingham Trent University; Lancaster University; King's College London
- Occupation: Politician
- Website: www.matthewofford.co.uk

Academic background
- Thesis: Rural governance and economic development: the changing landscape of rural local government (2011)

Matthew James Offord (born 3 September 1969) is a British Conservative Party politician who served as the Member of Parliament (MP) for Hendon in North London from 2010 to 2024. Prior to this, Offord was a political analyst for the BBC.

== Early life and education ==
Offord was born on 3 September 1969 in Alton, Hampshire, England to Christopher and Hilda Offord. His father was a builder. He attended Amery Hill School and then studied Geography at Nottingham Trent University. Offord also obtained a master's degree in Environment, Culture and Society from Lancaster University in 2000, and a PhD in Geography from King's College London.

== Political career ==
Offord stood as the Conservative candidate for Barnsley East and Mexborough in the 2001 general election. He came third in the seat behind the incumbent Labour MP Jeffrey Ennis and the Liberal Democrat candidate. The following year, he was elected as a councillor for Hendon ward on the Barnet London Borough Council. Offord was re-elected in 2006 and became the deputy leader of the council. He worked as a political analyst for the BBC between 2001 and 2010.

In 2010, he was elected as MP for Hendon by a majority of 106 votes. The seat had previously been held by Labour MP Andrew Dismore since 1997. The following year, he was one of 81 Conservative MPs who rebelled against the government by voting for a referendum on the UK's membership of the European Union. He was a member of the Association of European Parliamentarians with Africa Governing Council in 2011. Offord was one of 136 Conservative MPs to vote against the Marriage (Same Sex Couples) Act 2013 which legalised same-sex marriage in England and Wales. He voted against the Act as he felt that marriage should only between a man and a woman and that it could eventually lead to the legalisation of polygamy. He was also one of 21 MPs to vote against LGBT-inclusive sex and relationship education from primary school.

He was re-elected in the 2015 and 2017 general election. In parliament, he has been a member of the Environmental Audit Select Committee since December 2012. He is an officer of the Conservative Friends of Israel. Offord supported Brexit in the 2016 UK EU membership referendum. He is a member of the European Research Group. Offord voted for then Prime Minister Theresa May's Brexit withdrawal agreement in March 2019. He also voted against any referendum on a Brexit withdrawal agreement in the indicative votes on 27 March. He supported Boris Johnson's bid to become Conservative Party leader in 2019, and after he became prime minister voted for his Brexit withdrawal agreement in October.

In August 2022, Offord supported Liz Truss in the July–September 2022 Conservative Party leadership election and Boris Johnson in the October 2022 Conservative Party leadership election.

In March 2023, Offord was one of 22 Conservative MPs that voted against the Windsor Framework. He announced in May 2023 that he would stand down at the next general election, which occurred in 2024.

== Personal life ==
He is a Christian. Offord married in 2010 and divorced in 2018.

Parliament of the United Kingdom
Preceded by Andrew Dismore	Member of Parliament for Hendon; 2010–2024	Succeeded by David Pinto-Duschinsky
