= Airton (given name) =

Airton is the given name of:

- Airton Andrioli (born 1965), Brazilian football coach
- Aírton Beleza (Aírton Batista dos Santos, 1942–1996), Brazilian footballer
- Airton José dos Santos (born 1956), Brazilian Roman Catholic archbishop
- Airton Daré (born 1978), Brazilian race car driver
- Caíco, Brazilian retired footballer Aírton Graciliano dos Santo (born 1974)
- Airton (footballer, born 1994), Brazilian footballer Airton Moraes Michellon
- Airton Pavilhão (1934–2012), Brazilian footballer
- Aírton Ravagniani (born 1959), Brazilian footballer
- Airton (footballer, born February 1990), Brazilian footballer Airton Ribeiro Santos
- Airton (footballer, born 1989), Brazilian footballer Airton Santos de Oliveira
- Airton (footballer, born 1999), Brazilian footballer Airton Moisés Santos Sousa
- Airton (footballer, born March 1990), Brazilian footballer Airton Tirabassi

== See also ==
- Ayrton
