= Gerald Gould =

English writer

Gerald Gould (1885 – 2 November 1936) was an English writer, known as a journalist and reviewer, essayist and poet.

== Life ==
He was born in Scarborough, Yorkshire, and brought up in Norwich, and studied at University College London and Magdalen College, Oxford. He had a position at University College from 1906, and was a Fellow of Merton College, Oxford, from 1909 to 1916.

Gould had assisted the production of the edition of The Suffragette when the offices of the WSPU had been raided to review at the printers, whilst Grace Roe was going to Paris to speak to the Pankhursts.

On 6 February 1914 he and his wife Barbara Ayrton-Gould became two of the founders of the United Suffragists, which had male and female members, including Agnes Harben and her husband, and welcomed former militant and non-militants. The United Suffragists ended their campaign when the Representation of the People Act 1918 gave women limited suffrage in the United Kingdom. Gould gave a speech at the United Suffragists' Victory Celebration in Caxton Hall.

From 1914 he was an official in C. F. G. Masterman's Wellington House War Propaganda Bureau, which may explain his failure to produce much poetry concerned with the War. He also worked as a journalist on the Daily Herald as one of "Lansbury's Lambs" — the group of idealistic young men helping with it after George Lansbury purchased it in 1913, and which included G. D. H. Cole, W. N. Ewer, Harold Laski, William Mellor and Francis Meynell.

It was probably Gould who brought Siegfried Sassoon to the paper as literary editor after its relaunch in 1919. Gould regularly contributed poetry to the Herald and gave several sonnets to Millicent Fawcett's Common Cause when it became the Woman's Leader in 1920.

Gould also reviewed novels for the New Statesman, moving to The Observer as fiction editor in 1920. He was also (not coincidentally) made chief reader for Victor Gollancz Ltd, where he was involved in the early publication history of George Orwell. He died in 1936 in London.

== Family ==
Gould married Barbara Bodichon Ayrton (1888–1950), suffragist and after his death on the Labour National Executive and a Labour Party MP 1945–1950; she was daughter of the scientists William Edward Ayrton and Hertha Marks Ayrton. The artist Michael Ayrton (1921–1975) was their son.

== Works ==
- Lyrics (1906)
- On the Nature of Lyric (1909)
- My Lady's Book (1913)
- Poems (1914)
- Monogamy (1918) poems
- The Happy Tree and Other Poems (1919)
- The Journey: Odes and Sonnets (1920)
- Lady Adela (1920)
- The Coming Revolution in Great Britain (1920)
- The English Novel of Today (1924)
- The Return to the Cabbage and Other Essays and Sketches (1926)
- Beauty the Pilgrim (1927) poems
- Collected Poems (1929)
- Democritus or the Future of Laughter (1929)
- The Musical Glasses (1929) essays
- All About Women: Essays and Parodies (1931)
- Isabel (1932) novel
- Refuge From Nightmare (1933)

His poem Wander-thirst is often quoted.
