= David Pinto-Duschinsky =

British politician (born 1974)

David Pinto-Duschinsky MP
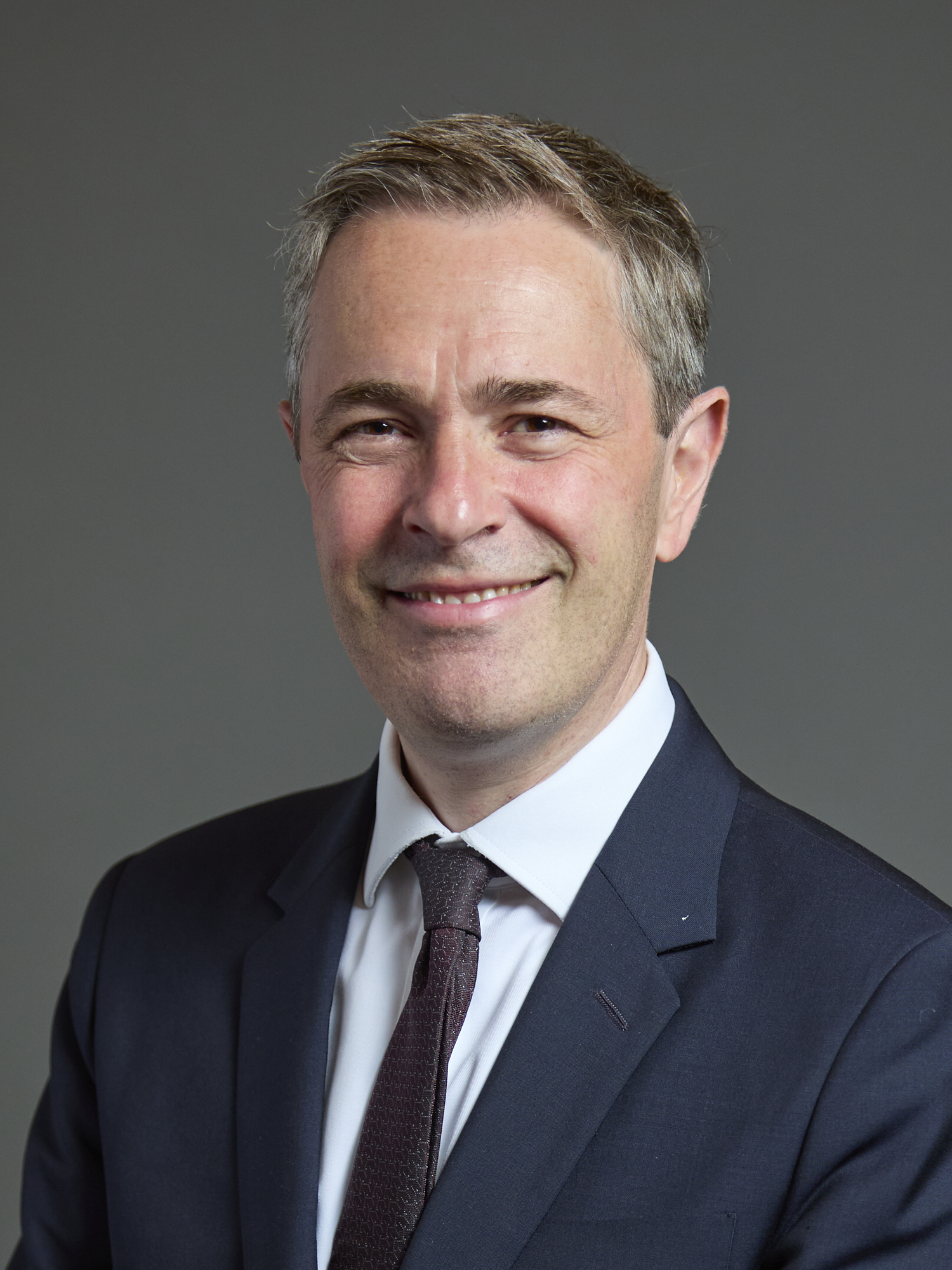
- Official portrait, 2024

Member of Parliament for Hendon
- Incumbent
- Assumed office 4 July 2024
- Preceded by: Matthew Offord
- Majority: 15 (0.04%)

Personal details
- Born: June 1974 (age 52)
- Party: Labour
- Parent: Michael Pinto-Duschinsky (father)
- Education: University of Oxford
- Alma mater: Magdalen College School, Pembroke College, Oxford
- Website: davidforhendon.com

David Johnathan Pinto-Duschinsky (born June 1974) is a British Labour Party politician who has been the Member of Parliament for Hendon since 2024. His majority is the smallest of any MP elected in the 2024 general election – 15 votes.

== Background ==
Pinto-Duschinsky is the son of Holocaust survivor and scholar Michael Pinto-Duschinsky. He had a severe stammer as a child, leaving him sometimes unable to say his own name, but overcame it through years of speech therapy through the National Health Service. He was educated at Magdalen College School and then Pembroke College, Oxford. He was President of the Oxford Union in 1995.

He worked as a consultant at McKinsey & Company and then as a partner at Ernst & Young. In politics, Pinto-Duschinsky served as an adviser to the former Labour Chancellor Alistair Darling and Deputy Director of the Prime Minister's Strategy Unit prior to his election as an MP.

== Political career ==
Pinto-Duschinsky first stood for election in the 2015 general election, running against George Osborne in the safe Conservative seat of Tatton, but did not win. In the 2019 general election, he stood for election in Hendon and lost to Conservative MP Matthew Offord.

In 2024, he ran again in Hendon and was elected as MP by just 15 votes after a recount—the smallest majority in that election. After the 2025 Runcorn and Helsby by-election, which took place during 2025 United Kingdom local elections, Sarah Pochin of Reform UK was elected with a margin of 6 votes, which makes Runcorn and Helsby the most marginal seat in the current Parliament.

Pinto-Duschinsky was previously a member of the Work and Pensions Select Committee. In June 2025, he voted against the Terminally Ill Adults (End of Life) Bill during its third reading.

In November 2025, Pinto-Duschinsky was recorded as a Parliamentary Private Secretary to the Department of Work and Pensions, leading to him to stand down from his select committee position as a result of this.

In May 2026, Pinto-Duschinsky backed Prime Minister Keir Starmer following calls for him to resign in the aftermath of successive defeats during the 2026 UK local elections.

== Electoral history ==
General election 2024: Hendon
Party	Candidate	Votes	%	±%
Labour	David Pinto-Duschinsky	15,855	38.43	▼2.5
Conservative	Ameet Jogia	15,840	38.39	▼10.5
Reform	Joshua Pearl	3,038	7.4	N/A
Green	Gabrielle Bailey	2,667	6.5	▲4.9
Liberal Democrats	Clareine Enderby	1,966	4.8	▼3.8
Workers Party	Imtiaz Palekar	1,518	3.7	N/A
Rejoin EU	Ben Rend	233	0.6	N/A
SDP	Jane Gibson	139	0.3	N/A
Majority		15	0.04	N/A
Turnout		41,256	55.1	▼8.7
Registered electors		74,865		
Labour gain from Conservative		Swing	▲4.0	

General election 2019: Hendon
Party	Candidate	Votes	%	±%
Conservative	Matthew Offord	26,878	48.8	+0.8
Labour	David Pinto-Duschinsky	22,648	41.1	–4.9
Liberal Democrats	Clareine Enderby	4,628	8.4	+4.6
Green	Portia Vincent-Kirby	921	1.7	+0.6
Majority		4,230	7.7	+5.7
Turnout		55,075	66.6	–1.6
Registered electors		82,661		
Conservative hold		Swing	+2.8	

General election 2015: Tatton
Party	Candidate	Votes	%	±%
Conservative	George Osborne	26,552	58.6	+4.0
Labour	David Pinto-Duschinsky	8,311	18.3	+1.1
UKIP	Stuart Hutton	4,871	10.8	N/A
Liberal Democrats	Gareth Wilson	3,850	8.5	−14.1
Green	Tina Rothery	1,714	3.8	N/A
Rejected ballots		185		
Majority		18,241	40.3	+8.3
Turnout		45,483	70.0	+2.1
Registered electors		65,004		
Conservative hold		Swing	+1.5	

Parliament of the United Kingdom
Preceded by Matthew Offord	Member of Parliament for Hendon; 2024–present	Incumbent
