= Aquascope =

Underwater viewing device

An aquascope (also called bathyscope) is an underwater viewing device. It is used to view the underwater world often from dry land or a boat. It eliminates the water surface glare and allows viewing as far as water clarity and light permit. The underwater viewer can be used for observing reefs, checking boat moorings, secchi disks and other survey work. It is also used as educational tool to watch plants, creatures and habitats underneath the surface of rivers, lakes and seas.

A more advanced version, an underwater telescope was patented by Sarah Mather in 1845 - U.S. Patent No. 3,995; it permitted sea-going vessels to survey the depths of the ocean. It used a camphine lamp in a glass globe that was sunk into the water. The device allowed the examination of a ship's hull and other details from the deck of a boat. In 1864, Mather added an improvement - U.S. Patent No. 43,465 to her previous invention to detect Southern underwater warships.

== Construction ==
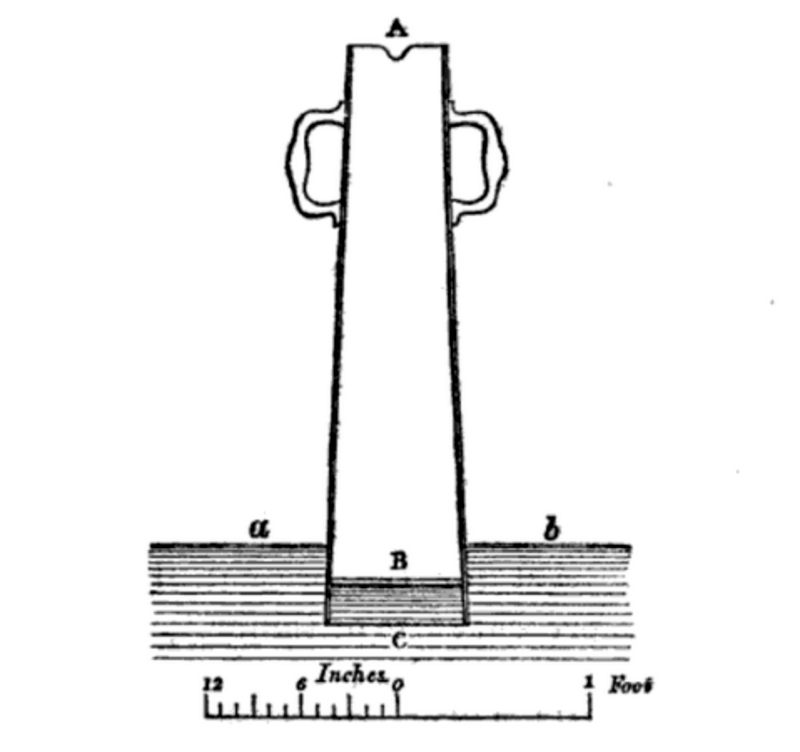
Bathyscope of c.a. 1850

The instrument which has been popularly named the Water, or Marine Telescope, from the power given by its use to see into the water, consists of a tube of metal or wood, of a convenient length, to enable a person looking over the gunnel of a boat to rest the head on the one end, while the other is below the surface of the water; the upper end is so formed, that the head may rest on it, both eyes seeing freely into the tube. Into the lower end is fixed (water-tight) a plate of glass, which, when used, is to be kept under the surface of the water.

A very convenient size for the instrument represented in the above figure, is to make the length AC, 3 feet, and the mouth A, where the face is applied, of an irregular oval form, that both eyes may see freely into the tube, with an indentation on one side, that the nose may breathe freely, not throwing the moisture of the breath into the tube. B is a round plate of glass, 8 inches diameter, over which is the rim or edge C; this rim is best formed of lead, J of an inch thick, and 3 inches deep; the weight of the lead serves to sink the tube a little into the water. Holes must be provided at the junction of B to C, for the purpose of allowing the air to escape, and bring the water into contact with the glass; on each side there is a handle for holding the instrument.

== Media ==
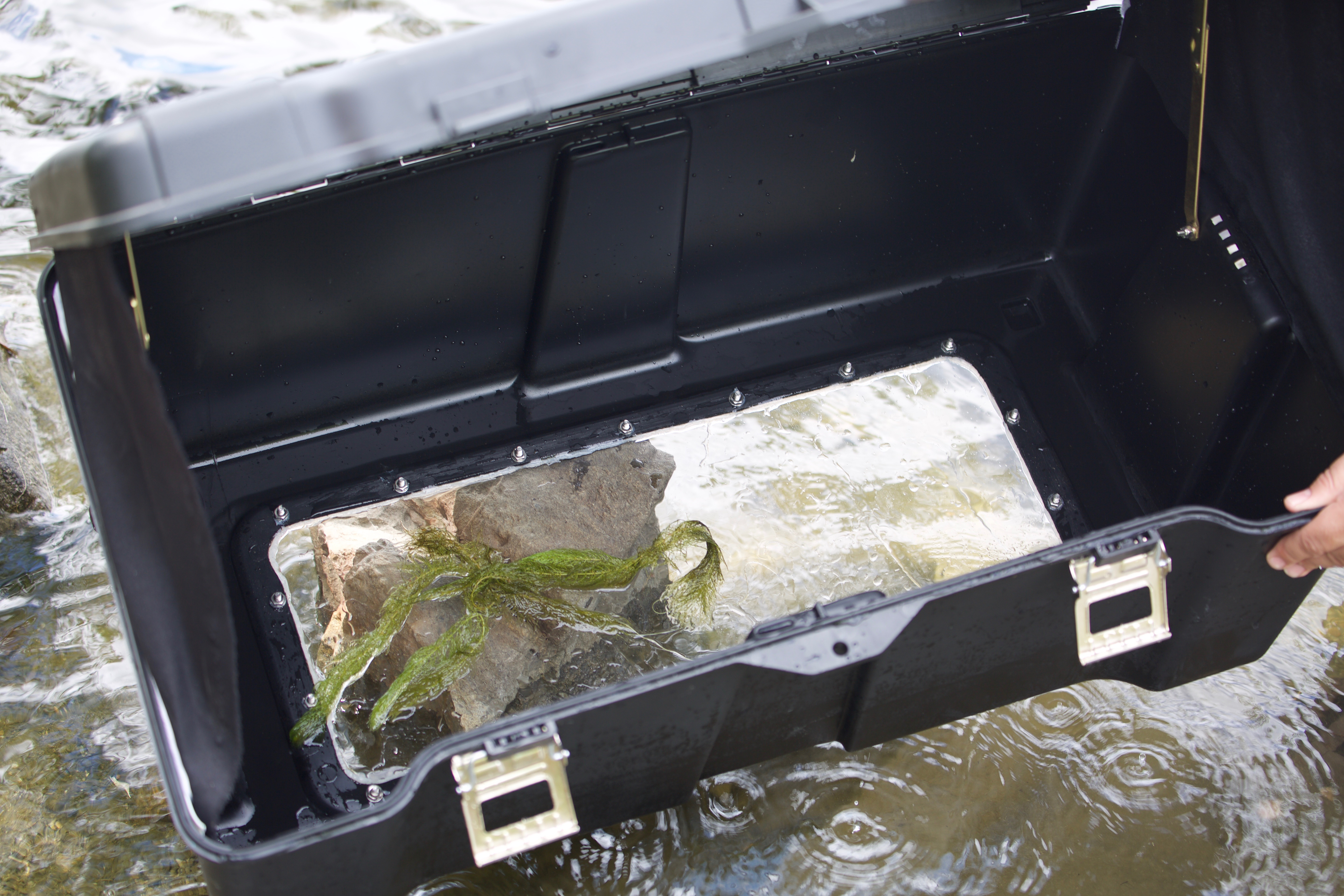
Portable acquascope

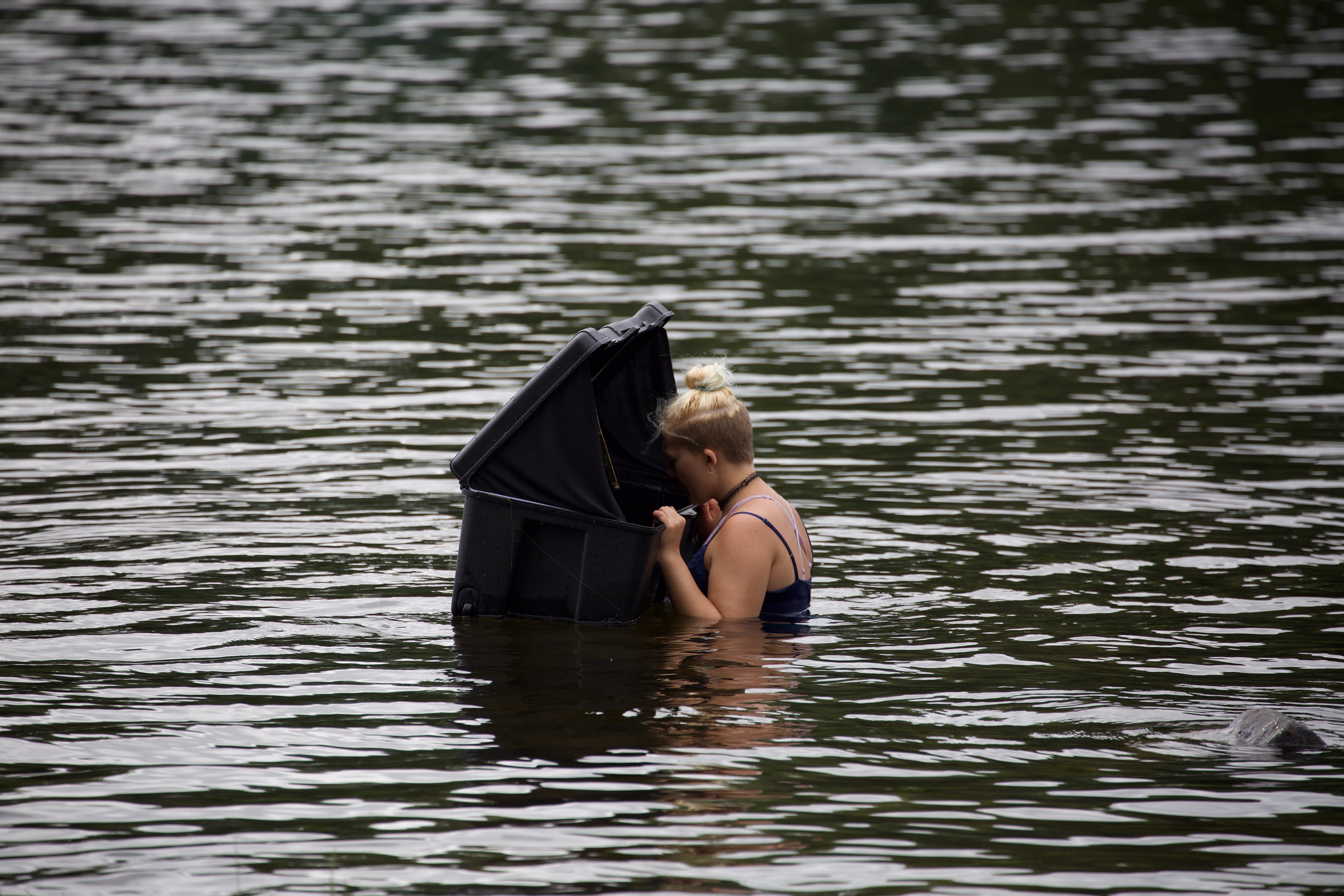
Acquascope in use

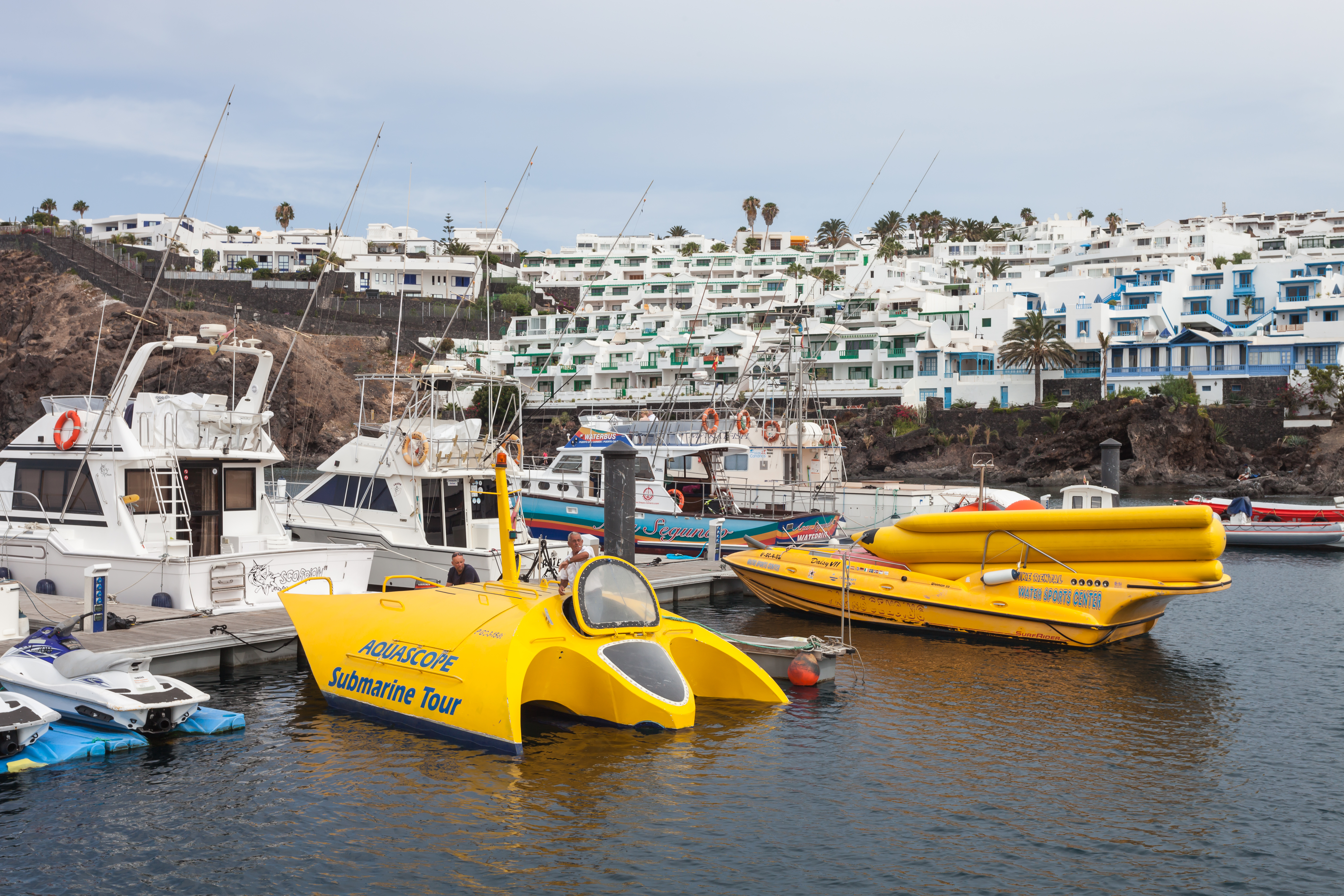
Aquascope submarine tour boats, Lanzarote, Spain

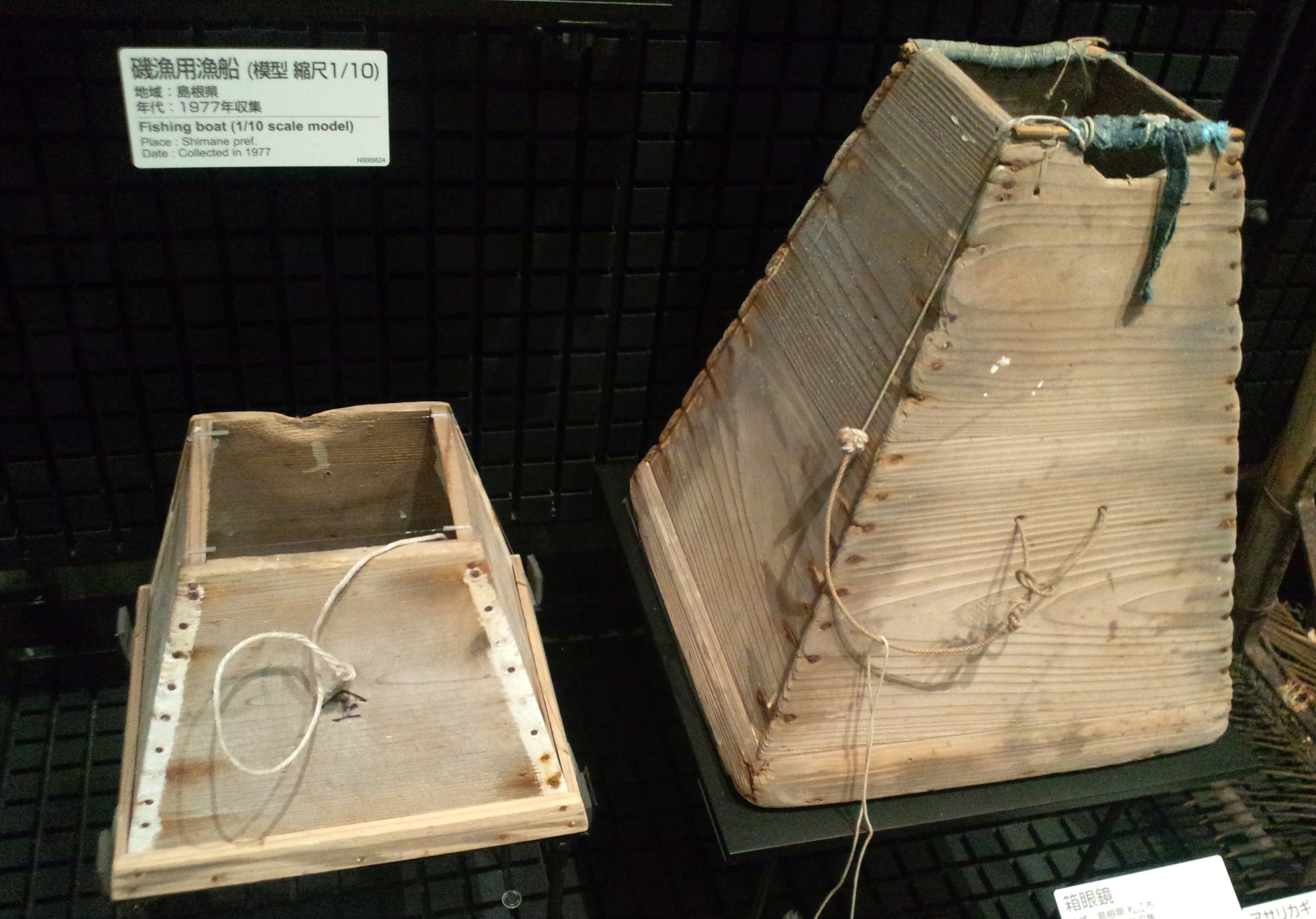
Underwater viewer, Museum of Ethnology, Osaka - 1976

== Bibliography ==
- Edinburgh New Philosophical Journal. 1850. pp. 117–.
- George Buist (1852). Manual of Physical Research Adapted for India. J. Macfarlane. pp. 1–.
- David Ames Wells; George Bliss, eds. (1851). "Description of the Marine or Water Telescope". The Annual of Scientific Discovery, Or, Year-book of Facts in Science and Art. Boston: Gould and Lincoln. pp. 143–144.
- The Annals of Philosophy. Baldwin, Cradock, and Joy. 1816. pp. 183–.
