= Amery Hill School =

Location
- Amery Hill; Alton, Hampshire, GU34 2BZ; England
- 51.15231°N 0.97721°W

Information
- Type: Academy
- Local authority: Hampshire
- Trust: Amery Hill School Academy Trust
- Department for Education URN: 137535 Tables
- Ofsted: Reports
- Headteacher: R. Jeckells
- Gender: Coeducational
- Age: 11 to 16
- Website: ameryhill.hants.sch.uk

Amery Hill School is a coeducational secondary school with academy status set on a hill above the market town of Alton, Hampshire, England. Its head teacher is R. Jeckells.

== History ==
It was awarded Music College specialist school status in 2004 by the Department for Education and Skills (DfES). It was rated 'a good school' and 'not yet an outstanding school' in the Ofsted inspection report (2013). Amery Hill School is now part of the ICT Register, a database that captures ICT and eLearning expertise in schools and learning centres across the world.

Previously a community school administered by Hampshire County Council, in October 2011 Amery Hill School converted to academy status. The school is now sponsored by the Amery Hill School Academy Trust.

== Facilities ==
School facilities include interactive whiteboards and data projectors in all classrooms and an artificial turf sports pitch. The school has recently been designated as 'accessible' through the provision of lifts and ramps to make all parts of the building suitable for disabled persons. Having reached the standard for recognition as a 'High Performing Secondary School', a second specialism in mathematics is being developed. In 2018 the school secured Department for Education funding for the building of a new Performing Arts Centre, kitchen and dining facilities.

== Area schools ==
The school enjoys close collaboration with nearby Alton College, and Amery Hill students attend the college for some enrichment and curriculum courses. In addition, the school works closely as a member of the East Hampshire 14–19 Consortium in developing Applied Diplomas for first teaching in 2009.

== Notable former pupils ==
- Matthew Offord, MP
- Chris Wood, cricketer
- Laura Jurd, musician and composer
- Nadia Oh, pop musician
- Alison Goldfrapp, musician and record producer
