= John Gorst (Hendon North MP) =

British Conservative politician

Sir John Gorst

Member of Parliament for Hendon North
- In office 18 June 1970 – 8 April 1997
- Preceded by: Sir Ian Orr-Ewing
- Succeeded by: Constituency abolished

Personal details
- Born: John Michael Gorst; 28 June 1928
- Died: 31 July 2010 (aged 82)
- Party: Conservative
- Spouse: Noël Walker (m. 1954)
- Education: Corpus Christi College, Cambridge

Sir John Michael Gorst (28 June 1928 – 31 July 2010) was a British Conservative politician.

== Career ==
He was educated at Ardingly College and read French and History at Corpus Christi College, Cambridge. In 1953 he joined the advertising department of Pye Ltd.

As the joint founder in 1963 of the Local Radio Association, with John Whitney, Gorst campaigned for the introduction of commercial radio services.

At the 1964 general election he fought Chester-le-Street and in 1966, he was again an unsuccessful candidate in the Bodmin constituency in Cornwall, losing to the sitting Liberal MP, Peter Bessell.

At the 1970 general election, he was elected MP for Hendon North, holding the seat until it was abolished by boundary changes in 1997. In December 1996, he resigned the Conservative whip in protest at the closure of a casualty unit at a local hospital. This deprived John Major of his parliamentary majority.

In the 1997 general election, he stood in the new seat of Hendon, losing to Labour's Andrew Dismore.

== Family ==
He was the great-grandson of Sir John Eldon Gorst. Gorst married Noël Rossana, a ballerina, in 1954.

Parliament of the United Kingdom
Preceded by Sir Ian Orr-Ewing	Member of Parliament for Hendon North; 1970–1997	Constituency abolished
