= Sarah Mather =

American inventor

Sarah Mather (1796, in Brooklyn – June 21, 1868) was an American inventor, best remembered for patenting the first underwater telescope.

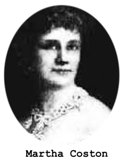
Sarah Mather's portrait

Sarah Mather (fl. 1840s–1860s) was an American inventor best known for developing an early submarine telescope, a device that enabled visual inspection of submerged objects without the need for diving or dry docking. Her invention contributed to advancements in both commercial and military maritime practices and was one of the earliest documented underwater observation technologies. Mather was among the few women in 19th-century America to be granted a United States patent for a technological invention, making her an early figure in the history of women in science and engineering.

== Background ==
Sarah Mather (born Sarah Porter Stinson or Stimson, c. 1796) lived in Brooklyn, New York. In 1819, she married Harlow Mather, and the couple had several children, including a daughter, Olive M. Devoe. Late in her life, Mather was involved in charitable work supporting children of Civil War soldiers and participated in literary and publishing activities. Although detailed biographical information about her life is scarce, she is known to have been active as an inventor during a period when women were largely excluded from formal scientific and technical institutions. Social and legal constraints of the time made it difficult for women to be acknowledged as inventors, and most patents were filed by men.

There is also evidence that Mather worked closely with her son, who co-filed a later improvement patent with her in 1864. This collaboration suggests that her inventive work may have taken place within a family context that supported technological experimentation, which was one of the few avenues available to women innovators of her era.

== Invention of the submarine telescope ==
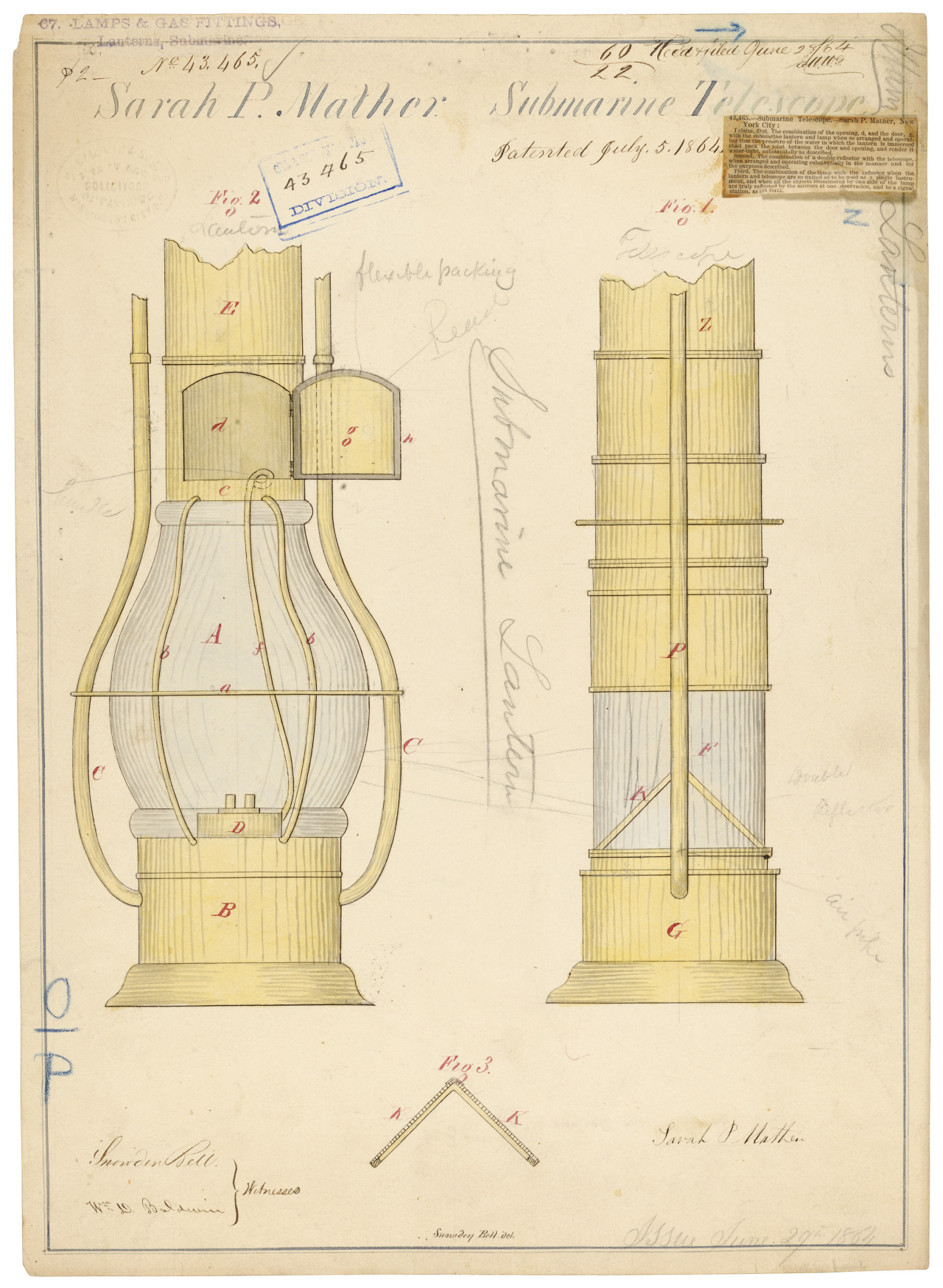
Sarah P. Mather’s Submarine Telescope, 07/05/1864

The Submarine Telescope was a device that allowed observers to view items below the surface of the water from above. Her work as an inventor occurred during a time when women were largely excluded from education and employment in science, engineering, and patent law.

Sarah Mather was granted a United States Patent No. 3,755 dated April 16, 1845 for an Apparatus for Examining Objects Under Water. In describing her invention in the patent application, she stated that the device consisted of a tube having a lamp attached to one end of it and a telescope at the other end for observing underwater objects. As she explained in her patent application, the function of her invention was quite simple yet highly valuable: persons located above the surface of the water can visually examine objects located beneath the surface without requiring direct immersion into the water. Further, she incorporated safety and watertight aspects into her design demonstrating her consideration of several technical issues associated with providing light and optical systems to operate underwater.[1]

The problem that Mather's invention attempted to solve was significant. Ship owners, mariners, engineers and harbor employees lacked sufficient means to visually assess underwater structures (e.g., examine ship hulls, locate debris, identify underwater obstacles, etc.) prior to the availability of Mather's invention. Assessing an object underwater could be hazardous and/or laborious. Mather's invention presented a safe and efficient method for performing these tasks. The patent itself noted that the invention could be applied to: inspect vessel hulls; detect underwater objects; facilitate fishing; aid in rock blasting operations to clear channels; provide assistance in laying foundations; and study geological formations. The number of uses for Mather's invention demonstrate that it was a functional tool developed to meet specific needs within both the maritime industry and general commercial/industrial sectors.[1][3].

It is also worth noting that Mather's invention occurred at a time when advancements in water transportation technology, naval construction technology and harbor infrastructure were essential for national and regional economic progress. There existed considerable cost savings in terms of time and expense related to assessing the bottom of ships while they remain submerged in water. Additionally, there was increased risk involved with poor underwater visibility. Accounts of Mather's work indicate that after its introduction, the submarine telescope gained particular usefulness in naval contexts and may have had additional wartime significance during the Civil War era due to the increasing importance of underwater threats and ship inspections.[3]. Although it is difficult to verify the full extent to which the submarine telescope was utilized during this time, it is evident that the device would have been beneficial in a time period when the ability to see underwater had strategic implications.[3].

In addition to developing the initial version of the submarine telescope, Sarah Mather continued to refine her designs. Twenty years after receiving her initial patent for her submarine telescope inventions, she was awarded another U.S. Patent No. 36,351 on February 21, 1864 entitled Improvement in Submarine Telescopes. In this second patent, she outlined problems inherent in the earlier versions of the devices (i.e., maintaining adequate illumination at greater depths and limiting the area viewed), as well as proposed solutions for those problems through modifications to protect the lamps better and expand the area visible to viewers from a single position. This is important because it demonstrates that she was continuously working to improve an inherently complicated piece of equipment over time.[4].

While the exact form of Mather's original invention is no longer employed today in the form she originally intended, the underlying concept that led to her creation continues to thrive today. Contemporary underwater inspection tools such as remote cameras, viewing systems and marine observation tools are all derived from the same fundamental objective that led Mather to create her original device: providing individuals with a safe and effective means of visualizing underwater environments without their need to enter them physically.[1][4]. Instead disappearing completely as an innovation, Mather's creation evolved into part of the broader historical context of underwater viewing technology. Moreover, Mather's work advanced the understanding that optics and artificial lighting can be effectively combined to provide more practical means of observing underwater environments.[1][5].

As such, Sarah Mather is also historically important due to her representation of a much larger body of women inventors whose contributions to technological advancement were frequently ignored or marginalized. Research studies regarding women who were issued patents have shown that women encountered both legal and societal barriers that hindered their capacity to invent and receive recognition for their inventions.[2]. Given these constraints, the fact that Sarah Mather successfully developed a commercially viable technical maritime device in both 1840s and 1860s provides further evidence of why she should be recognized. She resolved a real-world problem, developed an innovative solution to that problem that held both commercial and maritime value, and contributed to advancing subsequent underwater inspection technologies.[1][2][4].

Footnotes [1] U.S. Patent No. 3,995, Submarine Telescope, issued to Sarah P. Mather on April 16, 1845. [2] Smithsonian Lemelson Center, “Counting Women Inventors,” on the legal and social barriers faced by women inventors in the nineteenth century. [3] Women’s Activism NYC, “Sarah Mather,” on the uses and historical significance of Mather’s submarine telescope. [4] U.S. Patent for Mather’s 1864 improvement in submarine telescopes, describing problems in the earlier version and the later refinements. [5] Optics & Photonics News, describing Mather’s device as an unusual early optical instrument for seeing underwater.
