= Hendon (constituency) =

UK Parliament constituency (1918–1945, 1997 onwards)

- Borough constituency for the House of Commons
- Interactive map of boundaries from 2024
- Location within Greater London
- County: Greater London
- Electorate: 71,496 (March 2020)
- Major settlements: Hendon, Colindale, Burnt Oak, Mill Hill, Edgware

Current constituency
- Created: 1997
- Member of Parliament: David Pinto-Duschinsky (Labour)
- Seats: One
- Created from: Hendon North and parts of Hendon South

1918–1945
- Seats: One
- Created from: Harrow
- Replaced by: Harrow East, Harrow West, Hendon North, Hendon South and Wembley North

Hendon (/ˈhɛndən/) is a constituency (Note: A borough constituency (for the purposes of election expenses and type of returning officer).) in Greater London represented in the House of Commons of the UK Parliament since 2024 by David Pinto-Duschinsky of the Labour Party. (Note: As with all constituencies, Hendon elects one Member of Parliament (MP) by the first past the post system of election at least every five years. The first incarnation of Hendon was among the vast majority after 1918 which elected one MP.) It was created for the 1997 general election; an earlier version of the seat existed between 1918 and 1945.

In 2024, Pinto-Duschinsky won Hendon from the Conservatives by a margin of just 15 votes, making Hendon the most marginal seat in the United Kingdom.

== Constituency profile ==
Hendon is a suburban constituency in the Borough of Barnet in Greater London, located around 8 miles (13 km) north-west of the centre of London. It includes the neighbourhoods of Hendon, Colindale, Mill Hill and parts of Edgware. Like much of suburban London, the area was developed during the late 19th and early 20th centuries after the arrival of rail transport connecting it to the city centre. Hendon was an important centre for aircraft production as the site of Hendon Aerodrome, which has now been redeveloped. The constituency has below-average levels of wealth; there is high deprivation in Hendon whilst Mill Hill is more affluent. House prices are higher than the national average but marginally lower than the rest of London.

Hendon is ethnically and religiously diverse. White people made up 50% of the population at the 2021 census, just over half of whom were of British origin. The area has large Eastern European communities including Poles, Romanians, Hungarians and Albanians. Asians were 24% of the population, mostly Indians and Iranians, and Black people were 11%. The Asian and Black communities are mostly concentrated in Colindale. The constituency has one of the largest Jewish communities in the country; they made up 14% of residents in 2021 and are concentrated in Hendon and Edgware, where they made up around a third of the population.

In general, residents of Hendon are young and well-educated. They have low rates of homeownership, and household income is below the London average. A high proportion of residents work in health, education and retail, and few work in professional or scientific occupations. At the local borough council, West Hendon and Colindale are represented by the Labour Party whilst the rest of the constituency elected Conservatives. An estimated 58% of voters in the constituency supported remaining in the European Union in the 2016 referendum, a similar proportion to the rest of London and higher than the nationwide figure of 48%.

== History ==
=== 1918–1945 ===
The first incarnation of the constituency was created for the 1918 general election. By 1941, the estimated electorate reached 217,900. For the 1945 general election, the areas of the constituency were thus divided between North and South new entities and contributions to other new seats, including the principal part of Harrow East. The 1918–1945 was a period of near-full adult franchise and saw the most significant adult population increase nationally within the constituency, this coincided with a period of major residential building locally.

=== Since 1997 ===
In the boundary change legislation passed to implement the Fifth Periodic Review of Westminster constituencies for the 1997 general election, the London Borough of Barnet's parliamentary representation was reduced from four seats to three and the Hendon North constituency was combined with a northern part of the Hendon South constituency, creating the present Hendon constituency. A south-eastern swathe of former Hendon South was placed into Finchley and Golders Green. Within 10% of the average electorate, the seat avoided malapportionment that would otherwise exist by way of two undersized constituencies.

Including the period of division of the present area (1945—97) the various general elections up to 1997 were won by Conservatives, except for the 1945 victory of Barbara Ayrton-Gould (Labour), in Hendon North (1945–50). The last Liberal or Liberal Democrat to serve the area of either Hendon seat was in 1910. Only these three parties have won the seat or its predecessors.

== Boundaries ==
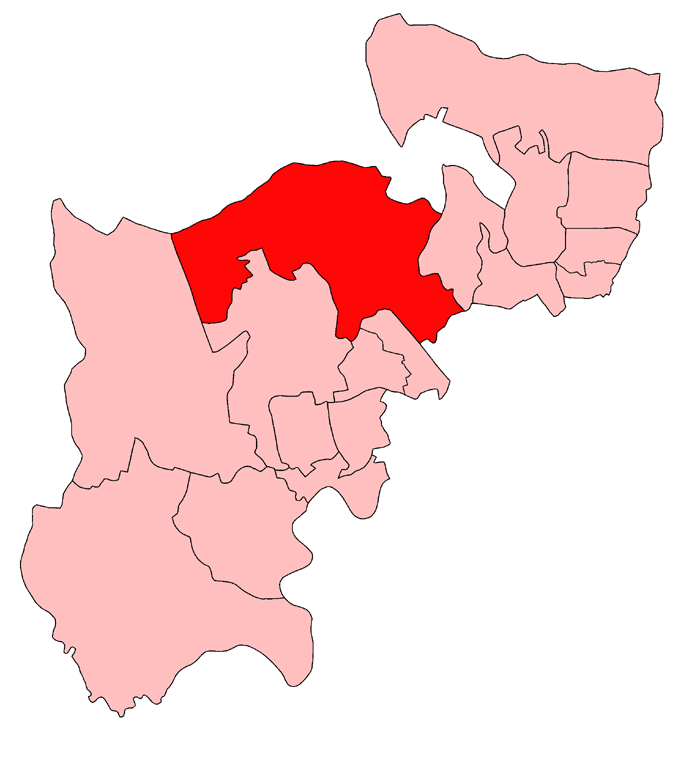
Hendon in Middlesex 1918–45

Map of boundaries 1997 to 2024

=== 1918–45 ===
The constituency covered the Urban Districts of Hendon and Kingsbury, and Hendon Rural District.

No national reviews took place between the Representation of the People Act 1918 which enfranchised this constituency and the next such Act in 1945. Later national reviews took place by the newly established Boundary Commissions for the four countries of United Kingdom for the elections of 1950, 1974, 1983, 1997 and 2010. As can be seen from the map, during the early period the seat spanned the area made up of the present seat and primarily the two neighbours to east and west, Chipping Barnet and Harrow East.

=== 1997–2024 ===
The London Borough of Barnet wards of Burnt Oak, Colindale, Edgware, Hale, Hendon, Mill Hill, and West Hendon.

=== Current ===
Following the 2023 Periodic Review of Westminster constituencies, which came into effect for the 2024 general election, the constituency is composed of the London Borough of Barnet wards of:

- Burnt Oak, Colindale North, Colindale South, Edgware, Hendon, Mill Hill, and West Hendon.

The new boundaries reflect the local authority boundary review which came into effect in May 2022. The composition of the constituency was reduced to bring the electorate within the permitted range, with Edgewarebury ward being transferred to Chipping Barnet.

== Members of Parliament ==
Election	Member	Party
1918	Philip Cunliffe-Lister	Conservative
1935	Reginald Blair	Conservative
1945	constituency abolished: see Hendon North and Hendon South	
1997	constituency recreated	
1997	Andrew Dismore	Labour
2010	Matthew Offord	Conservative
2024	David Pinto-Duschinsky	Labour

== Elections ==
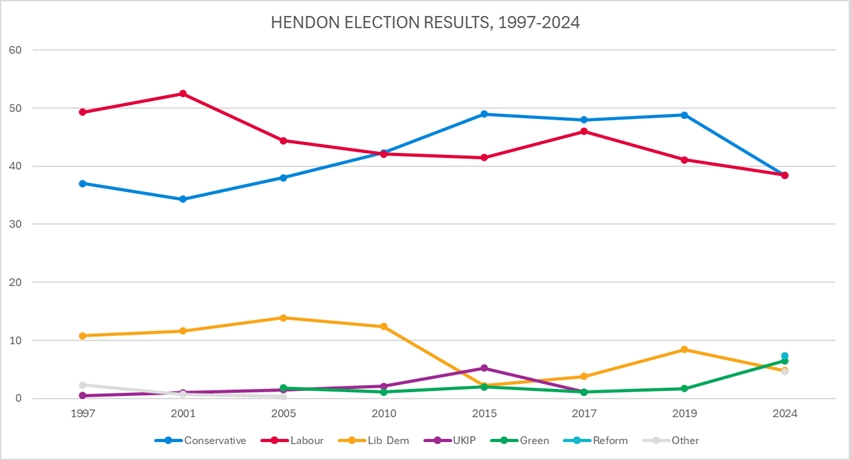
Election results 1997-2024

=== Elections in the 2020s ===
General election 2024: Hendon
Party	Candidate	Votes	%	±%
Labour	David Pinto-Duschinsky	15,855	38.43	▼2.5
Conservative	Ameet Jogia	15,840	38.39	▼10.5
Reform	Joshua Pearl	3,038	7.4	N/A
Green	Gabrielle Bailey	2,667	6.5	▲4.9
Liberal Democrats	Clareine Enderby	1,966	4.8	▼3.8
Workers Party	Imtiaz Palekar	1,518	3.7	N/A
Rejoin EU	Ben Rend	233	0.6	N/A
SDP	Jane Gibson	139	0.3	N/A
Majority		15	0.04	N/A
Turnout		41,256	55.1	▼8.7
Registered electors		74,865		
Labour gain from Conservative		Swing	▲4.0	

=== Elections in the 2010s ===
2019 notional result
Party	Vote	%
Conservative	22,299	48.9
Labour	18,638	40.9
Liberal Democrats	3,909	8.6
Green	747	1.6
Turnout	45,593	63.8
Electorate	71,496	

General election 2019: Hendon
Party	Candidate	Votes	%	±%
Conservative	Matthew Offord	26,878	48.8	+0.8
Labour	David Pinto-Duschinsky	22,648	41.1	–4.9
Liberal Democrats	Clareine Enderby	4,628	8.4	+4.6
Green	Portia Vincent-Kirby	921	1.7	+0.6
Majority		4,230	7.7	+5.7
Turnout		55,075	66.6	–1.6
Registered electors		82,661		
Conservative hold		Swing	+2.8	

General election 2017: Hendon
Party	Candidate	Votes	%	±%
Conservative	Matthew Offord	25,078	48.0	–1.0
Labour	Mike Katz	24,006	46.0	+4.5
Liberal Democrats	Alasdair Hill	1,985	3.8	+1.6
Green	Carmen Legarda	578	1.1	–0.9
UKIP	Sabriye Warsame	568	1.1	–4.1
Majority		1,072	2.0	–5.5
Turnout		52,185	68.2	+2.3
Registered electors		76,522		
Conservative hold		Swing	–2.7	

General election 2015: Hendon
Party	Candidate	Votes	%	±%
Conservative	Matthew Offord	24,328	49.0	+6.7
Labour	Andrew Dismore	20,604	41.5	−0.6
UKIP	Raymond Shamash	2,595	5.2	+3.1
Liberal Democrats	Alasdair Hill	1,088	2.2	−10.2
Green	Ben Samuel	1,015	2.0	+0.9
Majority		3,724	7.5	+7.3
Turnout		49,630	65.9	+7.1
Registered electors		75,285		
Conservative hold		Swing	+3.6	

General election 2010: Hendon
Party	Candidate	Votes	%	±%
Conservative	Matthew Offord	19,635	42.3	+5.2
Labour	Andrew Dismore	19,529	42.1	−3.0
Liberal Democrats	Matthew Harris	5,734	12.4	−1.7
UKIP	Robin Lambert	958	2.1	+0.5
Green	Andrew Newby	518	1.1	−0.7
Majority		106	0.2	N/A
Turnout		46,374	58.8	+0.5
Registered electors		72,943		
Conservative gain from Labour		Swing	-4.1	

=== Elections in the 2000s ===
General election 2005: Hendon
Party	Candidate	Votes	%	±%
Labour	Andrew Dismore	18,596	44.4	−8.1
Conservative	Richard Evans	15,897	38.0	+3.7
Liberal Democrats	Nahid Boethe	5,831	13.9	+2.3
Green	David G. Williams	754	1.8	N/A
UKIP	Melvyn Smallman	637	1.5	+0.5
Rainbow Dream Ticket	George Weiss	68	0.2	N/A
Progressive Democratic Party	Michael Stewart	56	0.1	−0.2
Majority		2,699	6.4	−11.8
Turnout		41,839	58.3	+6.1
Registered electors		71,924		
Labour hold		Swing	−6.5	

General election 2001: Hendon
Party	Candidate	Votes	%	±%
Labour	Andrew Dismore	21,432	52.5	+3.2
Conservative	Richard Evans	14,015	34.3	−2.7
Liberal Democrats	Wayne Casey	4,724	11.6	+0.8
UKIP	Craig Crosbie	409	1.0	+0.5
Workers Revolutionary	Stella Taylor	164	0.4	+0.1
Progressive Democratic Party	Michael Stewart	107	0.3	N/A
Majority		7,417	18.2	+5.9
Turnout		40,851	52.2	−13.5
Registered electors		78,213		
Labour hold		Swing	+2.9	

=== Elections in the 1990s ===
General election 1997: Hendon
Party	Candidate	Votes	%	±%
Labour	Andrew Dismore	24,683	49.3	
Conservative	John Gorst	18,528	37.0	
Liberal Democrats	Wayne Casey	5,427	10.8	
Referendum	Stanley Rabbow	978	2.0	
UKIP	Bernard P. Wright	267	0.5	
Workers Revolutionary	Stella Taylor	153	0.3	
Majority		6,155	12.3	
Turnout		50,036	65.7	
Registered electors		76,264		
Labour win (new seat)				

=== Elections in the 1930s ===
General election 1935: Hendon
Party	Candidate	Votes	%	±%
Conservative	Reginald Blair	69,762	65.78	−15.47
Labour	Amber Blanco White	28,375	26.75	+8.00
Liberal	Basil Goldstone	7,920	7.47	N/A
Majority		41,387	39.03	−23.47
Turnout		106,057	64.35	−7.38
Registered electors		164,802		
Conservative hold		Swing		

General election 1931: Hendon
Party	Candidate	Votes	%	±%
Conservative	Philip Cunliffe-Lister	66,305	81.25	+28.95
Labour	Amber Blanco White	15,305	18.75	−6.75
Majority		51,000	62.50	+35.70
Turnout		81,610	71.73	−0.27
Registered electors		113,780		
Conservative hold		Swing		

=== Elections in the 1920s ===
Corbett Ashby

General election 1929: Hendon
Party	Candidate	Votes	%	±%
Unionist	Philip Cunliffe-Lister	31,758	52.3	−11.5
Labour	Robert Lyons	15,434	25.5	+8.0
Liberal	Margery Corbett Ashby	13,449	22.2	+3.5
Majority		16,324	26.8	−18.3
Turnout		60,641	72.0	−2.9
Registered electors		84,212		
Unionist hold		Swing	-9.8	

General election 1924: Hendon
Party	Candidate	Votes	%	±%
Unionist	Philip Lloyd-Greame	19,183	63.8	+11.9
Liberal	Archibald John Blue	5,618	18.7	−9.9
Labour	J. Allen Skinner	5,267	17.5	−2.0
Majority		13,565	45.1	+21.8
Turnout		30,068	74.9	+7.6
Registered electors		40,163		
Unionist hold		Swing	+10.9	

General election 1923: Hendon
Party	Candidate	Votes	%	±%
Unionist	Philip Lloyd-Greame	13,278	51.9	−10.9
Liberal	J. M. Robertson	7,324	28.6	+8.2
Labour	Charles Latham	5,005	19.5	+2.7
Majority		5,954	23.3	−19.1
Turnout		25,607	67.3	−8.5
Registered electors		38,065		
Unionist hold		Swing	-9.6	

General election 1922: Hendon
Party	Candidate	Votes	%	±%
Unionist	Philip Lloyd-Greame	17,402	62.8	−10.6
Liberal	Douglas Young	5,650	20.4	N/A
Labour	Charles Latham	4,669	16.8	+0.7
Majority		11,752	42.4	−14.9
Turnout		27,721	75.8	+16.4
Registered electors		36,558		
Unionist hold		Swing	-5.7	

=== Elections in the 1910s ===
General election 1918: Hendon
Party		Candidate	Votes	%	±%
C	Unionist	Philip Lloyd-Greame	14,431	73.4	
	Labour	Frank Bailey	3,159	16.1	
	Women's Parliamentary League	Edith How-Martyn	2,067	10.5	
Majority			11,272	57.3	
Turnout			19,657	59.4	
Registered electors			33,117		
	Unionist win (new seat)				

== See also ==
- List of parliamentary constituencies in London
