= Ayrton Ribeiro =

Portuguese footballer (born 1997)

Personal information
- Full name: Ayrton Garcia Ribeiro
- Date of birth: 9 September 1997 (age 29)
- Place of birth: Portugal
- Height: 1.80 m (5 ft 11 in)
- Position: Defender

Team information
- Current team: Münsingen
- Number: 16

Youth career
- Thun

Senior career*
Years	Team	Apps	(Gls)
2015–2018	Thun	1	(0)
2015–2018	→ Thun U21	64	(5)
2018–	Münsingen	34	(1)
- * Club domestic league appearances and goals as of 3 November 2019

Ayrton Garcia Ribeiro (born 9 September 1997) is a Portuguese footballer who plays for Münsingen, as a defender.

== Career ==
On 6 August 2016, Ribeiro made his professional debut with Thun in a 2016–17 Swiss Super League match against Young Boys.
