= Barbara Ayrton-Gould =

British Labour Party politician, suffragist and pacifist (1886-1950)

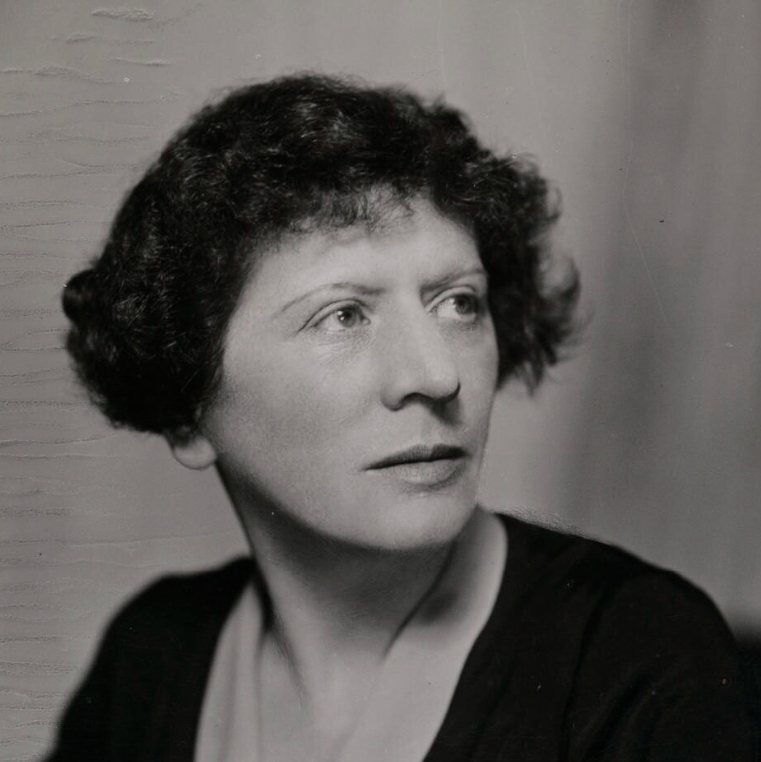
- Ayrton-Gould in 1930s

Member of Parliament for Hendon North
- In office 5 July 1945 – 3 February 1950
- Preceded by: Constituency established
- Succeeded by: Ian Orr-Ewing

Personal details
- Born: Barbara Bodichon Ayrton; 3 April 1886 Kensington, London, England
- Died: 14 October 1950 (aged 64)
- Party: Labour
- Spouse: Gerald Gould (d. 1936)
- Relations: William Edward Ayrton (father); Hertha Marks Ayrton (mother); Edith Ayrton (half-sister); Michael Ayrton (son)
- Education: University College, London
- Nickname: Barbie

Barbara Bodichon Ayrton-Gould (née Ayrton; 3 April 1886 – 14 October 1950) was a British Labour Party politician, suffragist and pacifist, who served as the Member of Parliament (MP) for Hendon North from 1945 to 1950. She was a member of the Women's Social and Political Union (WSPU) and co-founded the United Suffragists, was a member of the National Peace Council (NPC) and was the honorary secretary of the Women's International League for Peace and Freedom (WILPF).

== Background and family life ==
Ayrton-Gould was born on 3 April 1886 in Kensington, London, the daughter of prominent electrical engineers and inventors Hertha Ayrton and William Edward Ayrton. Her middle name of Bodichon was inspired by the surname of the English educationalist and feminist Barbara Bodichon.

Ayrton-Gould was educated at Notting Hill High School, then studied a degree in chemistry and physics at University College London.

Ayrton-Gould married the writer Gerald Gould (1885–1936), The artist and writer Michael Ayrton (1921–1975) was their son. Until 1930, Gould worked as publicity manager of the Daily Herald.

Shortly after the death of her mother in August 1923, Ayrton-Gould requested that a biography of her mother's achievement be written, which was completed by Evelyn Sharp.

== Suffrage work ==
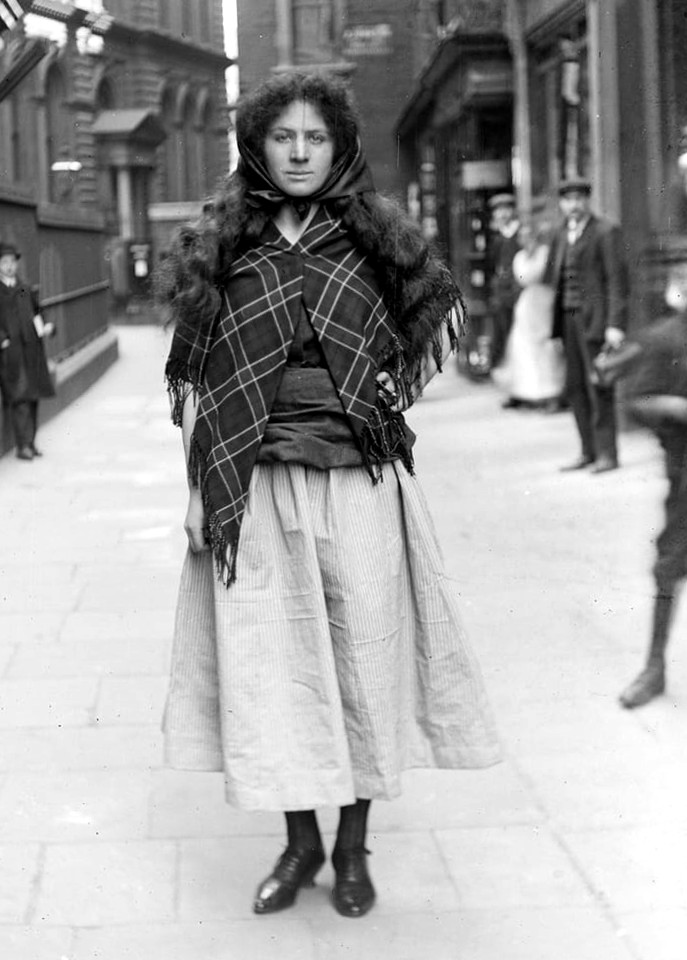
Ayrton dressed as Grace Darling to promote the WSPU Women's exhibition, in May 1909

In 1906, Aytron-Gould became a member of the Women's Social and Political Union (WSPU) alongside her mother, and gave up her science research to be a full-time organizer for them by 1909. She wrote the pro-suffrage pamphlet The Democratic Plea for the Men's Political Union for Women's Enfranchisement.

In March 1912, Ayrton-Gould participated in smashing store windows in the West End of London for suffrage, for which she served time in prison. On her release, in 1913, she went to France, disguised as a schoolgirl, so she would not be arrested again.

In 1914, Ayrton-Gould left the WSPU due to frustration with the autocratic tendencies of their leaders, Christabel Pankhurst's continuing absence. and the use of arson. On 6 February 1914, she, her husband, and Evelyn Sharp founded the United Suffragists, notable for accepting both male and female members. The United Suffragists ended their campaign when 1918's Representation of the People Act gave women limited suffrage in the United Kingdom.

== Pacifism ==
In 1918, Ayrton-Gould became a member of the National Peace Council (NPC) and the honorary secretary of the Women's International League for Peace and Freedom (WILPF).

In 1919, Ayrton-Gould was arrested in Trafalgar Square, London, alongside Eglantyne Jebb, for handing out leaflets demanding that the government end the naval blockade of the Central Powers, which was in violation of the Defence of the Realm Act 1914. Ayrton-Gould and Jebb also chalked messages on the pavement in front of the National Gallery in London about their cause.

== Political office ==
Ayrton-Gould became a member of the National Executive Committee (NEC) of the Labour Party in 1929, and served as vice-Chair in 1938 and Chair of the Labour Party from 1939 to 1940.

From 1922 Ayrton-Gould made four unsuccessful attempts to get elected as a Member of Parliament. During the general election of 1929 she missed victory in Northwich by only four votes. She unsuccessfully stood for Northwich again in 1931 and in the 1935 Norwood by-election.

The fifth time that Ayrton-Gould stood for office, she was elected Member of Parliament for newly created Hendon North constituency in Labour's landslide victory of 1945. The forerunner constituency, Hendon, had since 1935 grown considerably in population (and to some extent number of homes) and was split in two; it had been solidly won by Conservative candidates since 1910, however the north division fell to Gould's campaign, a feat not to be repeated until 1997 by a Labour candidate. In Parliament, the two main issues of Gould's concern were food supplies and child poverty. She succeeded in introducing a resolution which called for a government enquiry into child neglect. Aytron-Gould also was a Justice of the Peace in Marylebone and served as a member of the Arts Council.

Ayrton-Gould held the seat until losing the next general election (in 1950), when it was gained by Ian Orr-Ewing (Conservative). She withdrew as prospective candidate for the constituency in September because of ill health. A month later on 14 October 1950 Gould died, aged 64, eight months after leaving the House of Commons.

== Bibliography ==
- Leigh Rayment's Historical List of MPs

Parliament of the United Kingdom
New constituency	Member of Parliament for Hendon North; 1945 – 1950	Succeeded by Ian Orr-Ewing
Party political offices
Preceded by George Dallas	Chair of the Labour Party; 1939–1940	Succeeded by James Walker
