= Ian Orr-Ewing, Baron Orr-Ewing =

British politician (1912–1999)

The Right Honourable The Lord Orr-Ewing OBE
- Lord Orr-Ewing, in 1961

Member of Parliament for Hendon North
- In office 23 February 1950 – 29 May 1970
- Preceded by: Barbara Gould
- Succeeded by: John Michael Gorst

Personal details
- Born: Charles Ian Orr-Ewing; 10 February 1912
- Died: 19 August 1999 (aged 87)
- Party: Conservative
- Relatives: Archibald Orr-Ewing (paternal great-grandfather); Norah Runge (aunt)
- Education: Harrow School
- Alma mater: Trinity College, Oxford
- Occupation: radio engineer, politician

Charles Ian Orr-Ewing, Baron Orr-Ewing, OBE (10 February 1912 – 19 August 1999) was a British Conservative politician.

== Early life ==
Orr-Ewing was a great-grandson of Sir Archibald Orr-Ewing, Bt. He was educated at Harrow School and Trinity College, Oxford. At Trinity College he qualified as an electrical engineer, with an MA in physics. Then, as a 22-year-old graduate apprentice at EMI in 1934, he was part of a team of three which built the first production television set.

== Career ==
Orr-Ewing worked with the BBC from 1937 until 1939, when he joined the Royal Air Force Volunteer Reserve and served in the North Africa, Italy and North-West Europe theatres during World War II and was also General Eisenhower's Chief Radar Officer in 1945. He was appointed an Officer of the Order of the British Empire (OBE) in 1945. After the war, he returned to the BBC until 1949.

Orr-Ewing's political career began in 1950, when he was elected Member of Parliament for Hendon North, a seat he held for five elections. During this time, he was: Parliamentary Private Secretary to Walter Monckton, the Minister of Labour, from 1951 to 1955; Parliamentary Under-Secretary to George Reginald Ward, the Secretary of State for Air, from 1957 to 1959; Parliamentary and Financial Secretary to the Admiralty in 1959; Civil Lord of the Admiralty from 1959 to 1963; Vice-president of the Parliamentary and Scientific Committee in 1966 and vice-chairman of the Defence Committee from 1966 to 1970.

Between 1951 and 1954, he served on the Council of the Royal Television Society.

Having been created a baronet in 1963, Orr-Ewing retired from the House of Commons in 1970 and was created a life peer on 30 April 1971, as Baron Orr-Ewing, of Little Berkhamsted in the County of Hertfordshire.

== Personal life ==
Orr-Ewing was an amateur radio enthusiast, holding the call sign G5OG until his death. The format of his call sign indicates that his licence was issued between 1921 and 1939. In November 1976 during the opening of Parliament, prior to his announcement of Presidency of the Radio Society of Great Britain, George Wallace, Baron Wallace of Coslany quipped that Orr-Ewing held an amateur licence and that he was colloquially known as "George Five Old Girl", a play on his call sign using non-standard phonetic alphabet. Orr-Ewing died on 19 August 1999.

Coat of arms of Ian Orr-Ewing, Baron Orr-Ewing

Crest
A demi-lion rampant Gules holding in the dexter paw a mullet Azure and nesting the sinister paw on a portcullis chained Or.
Escutcheon
Argent on a chevron ensigned with a banner between in chief two mullets and in base a representation of the path of two electrons rotating around a nucleus Gules a pair of wings conjoined in lure between two lymphads sails furled penons and flags flying Or.
Motto
Audaciter

Parliament of the United Kingdom
Preceded by Barbara Gould	Member of Parliament for Hendon North; 1950 – 1970	Succeeded by Sir John Gorst
Baronetage of the United Kingdom
New creation	Baronet (of Hendon); 1963–1999	Succeeded by Simon Orr-Ewing
