= Ayrton Fagundes =

Brazilian journalist (1937–1994)

- Born: February 11, 1937; Passo Fundo, Brazil
- Died: March 14, 1994 (aged 57)
- Occupation: Journalist

Ayrton Fagundes (February 11, 1937 – March 14, 1994) was a Brazilian broadcast journalist.

Fagundes was best known for his work as an anchorman for prime time television newscasts such as Camera 10, then-TV Difusora (now Band TV), Globo TV Southern subsidiary RBS, and TV Record. Ayrton Fagundes belongs to the first generation of Brazilian journalists, who introduced the concept of nightly news programming and weekly magazines as a new genre to Brazil.

A presenter, editor, and executive producer, he spent the last years of his career in the capital of Brazil, Brasília, where he was appointed bureau-chief of the Brazilian financial news daily Jornal do Comercio, of Porto Alegre, writing a daily column in politics.

Later he was appointed chief-spokesperson for the Secretaria Especial de Informatica (SEI), at the Brazilian Ministry of Science and Technology, during the early years of the information technology industry in Brazil, where he worked with the new regulatory framework surrounding the nascent computer industry. He was interviewed by Alan Riding, of The New York Times, on several occasions, regarding Brazil's "prickly computer policies".
