= Fagundes, Paraíba =

Coordinates: 7.355°S 35.775°W

- Municipality
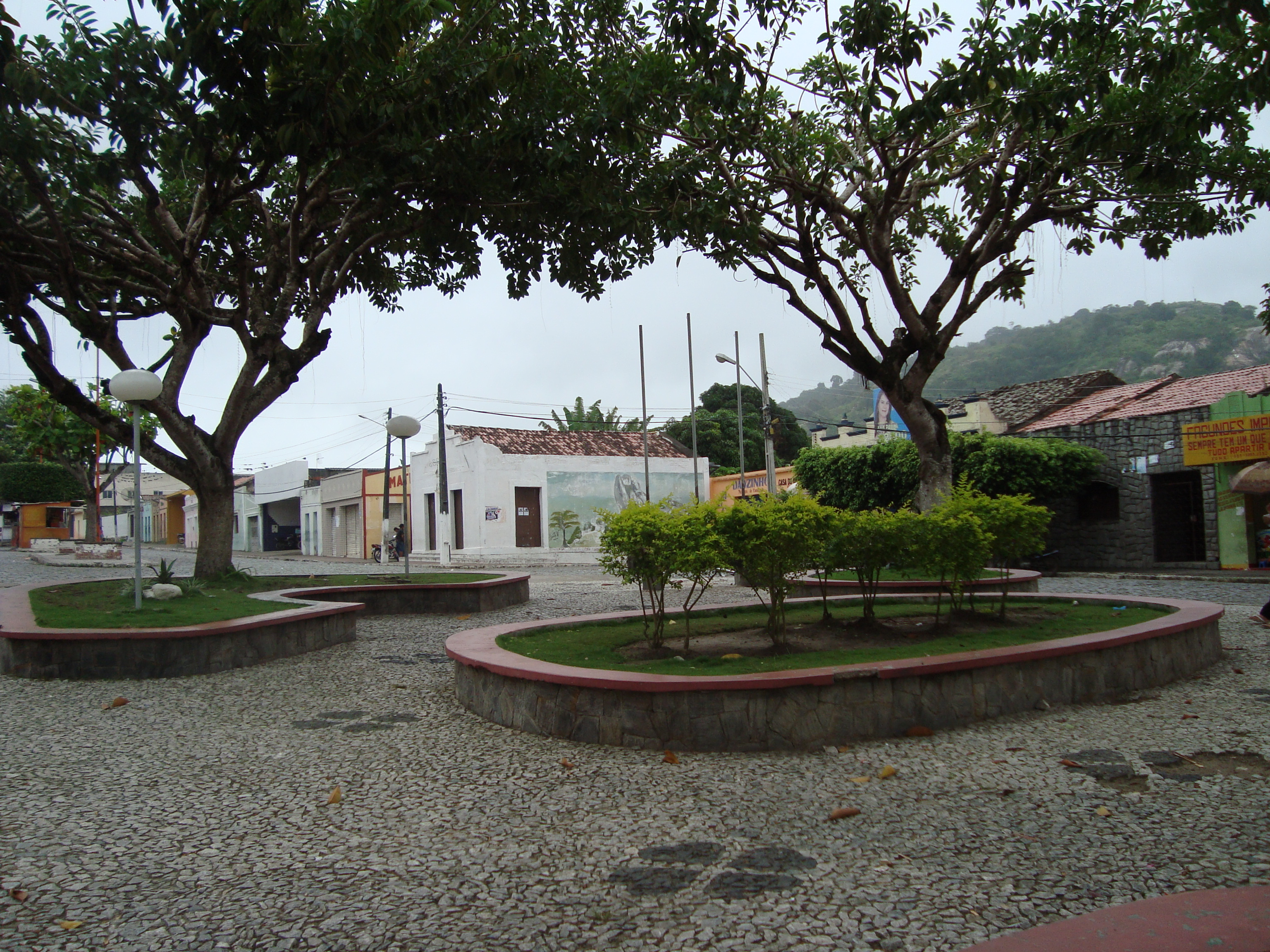

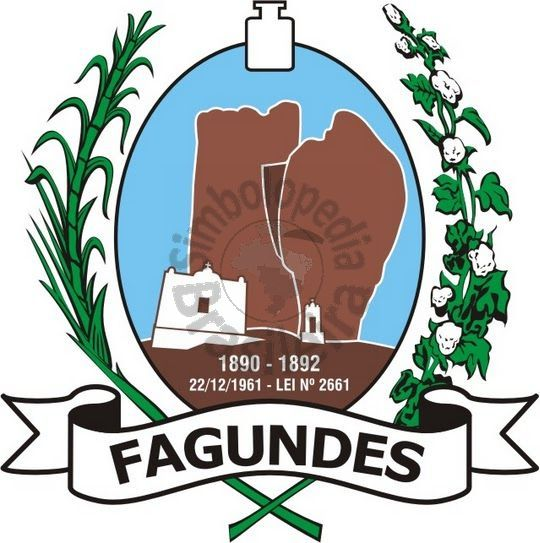
- Flag Coat of arms
- Interactive map of Fagundes, Paraíba
- Country: Brazil
- Region: Northeast
- State: Paraíba
- Mesoregion: Agreste Paraibano

Population (2020)
  - Total: 11,215
- Time zone: UTC−3 (BRT)

Fagundes (Central northeastern portuguese pronunciation: [fɐˈɡũdis]) is a municipality in the state of Paraíba in the Northeast Region of Brazil.

== See also ==
- List of municipalities in Paraíba
