= Hewes =

Hewes is a surname. Notable people with the surname include:

== People ==
- Joseph Hewes (1730–1779), signer of the United States Declaration of Independence
  - USS Joseph Hewes (AP-50), a ship acquired by the US Navy 8 January 1942 and sunk 11 November 1942
  - USS Joseph Hewes (FF-1078), a Knox class frigate launched 7 March 1970 and transferred to Taiwan in 1999
- Bettie Hewes (1921–2001), Canadian politician
- Billy Hewes (born 1961), American politician from Mississippi
- David Hewes (1822–1915), American industrialist
- George Robert Twelves Hewes (1742–1840), one of the last survivors of the American Revolution
- Henry Hewes (critic) (1917–2006), American theater writer for Saturday Review
- Henry Hewes (politician) (born 1949), American activist
- Richard Hewes (1926–2014), American politician from Maine

== Fictional characters ==
- Patty Hewes, a fictional character from Damages (TV series)

== See also ==
- Hew (disambiguation)
- Hues (disambiguation)
- Hus (disambiguation)
- Hews (disambiguation)
- Hewes Street station, on the New York City Subway, U.S.
- Hewes Point, a peninsula in Maine, U.S.
- Rip Hewes Stadium, a 10,000-seat stadium located in Dothan, Alabama, U.S.
- Hewes v. M'Dowell, a Pennsylvania Provincial Court case
