= Hugh (disambiguation) =

Hugh may refer to:

- Hugh, a given name, including a list of people and fictional characters with the given name and mononym
- Hugh, Northern Territory, a locality in Australia
- Hugh Lake, in Quebec, Canada
- Hugh (robot), an artificial intelligence robot librarian
- Hugh, an acronym for Hill Under Graham Height, a category of hills in the British Isles

== See also ==
- Hew (disambiguation)
- Hue (disambiguation)
- Hughes (disambiguation)
- Hughs (disambiguation)
- Hugues, a given name
- Huw (disambiguation)
