= Hew =

Hew is a masculine given name. Notable people with the name include:

- Hew Ainslie (1792–1878), Scottish poet
- Hew Dalrymple, Lord North Berwick (1652–1737), Scottish judge and politician
- Sir Hew Dalrymple, 2nd Baronet (1712–1790), Scottish politician, grandson of the above
- Hew Dalrymple (advocate) (c. 1740–1774), Scottish advocate, poet and Attorney-General of Grenada
- Sir Hew Dalrymple, 3rd Baronet (1746–1800), Scottish politician, son of the 2nd Baronet
- Sir Hew Dalrymple, 1st Baronet, of High Mark (1750–1830), British Army general
- Hew Hamilton Dalrymple (1857–1945), Scottish politician
- Hew Dalrymple Fanshawe (1860–1957), British Army First World War general
- Hew Fraser (1877–1938), British field hockey player and politician
- Hew Raymond Griffiths (born 1962), a ring leader of DrinkOrDie or DOD, an underground software piracy network
- Sir Hew Dalrymple-Hamilton, 4th Baronet (1774–1834), British politician
- Sir Hew Hamilton-Dalrymple, 10th Baronet (1926–2018), retired British officer and former Lord Lieutenant of East Lothian
- Hew Locke (born 1959), British-Guyanese sculptor and visual artist
- Hew Lorimer (1907–1993), Scottish sculptor
- Hew Pike (born 1943), retired British Army lieutenant-general
- Hew Dalrymple Ross (1779–1868), British Army field marshal
- Hew Scott (1791–1872), minister of the Church of Scotland
- Hew Strachan (born 1949), Scottish military historian

== See also ==
- Hewes, a surname
- Hugh (given name)
- Hews (disambiguation)
