= Hew Fraser =

Scottish field hockey player

Personal information
- Born: 25 July 1877 Glasgow, Scotland
- Died: 11 August 1938 (aged 61) Boat of Garten, Scotland

Sport
- Sport: Field hockey
- Position: Half-back
Senior career
Years	Team	Caps	Goals
1906	Nondescripts	-	-
1907	Edinburgh Univ	-	-
1908–1912	Carlton Edinburgh	-	-
1913	Hawick	-	-
National team
Years	Team	Caps	Goals
1906–1910	Scotland		-
Medal record
Men's field hockey
Representing Great Britain
Bronze medal – third place	1908 London	Team competition

Hew Thomson Fraser (25 July 1877 – 11 August 1938) was a field hockey player and British Liberal Party politician from Scotland.

== Biography ==
Fraser was born in Glasgow and educated at Tayport Public School.

In 1908, he competed in the 1908 Summer Olympics, he won the bronze medal as member of the Scotland Hockey team.

He moved to London in 1920. He worked as an Insurance Broker.

He was Liberal parliamentary candidate for the Wood Green Division of Middlesex from 1929 to 1938. He fought the 1929 General Election, coming second, pushing the Labour candidate into third place.

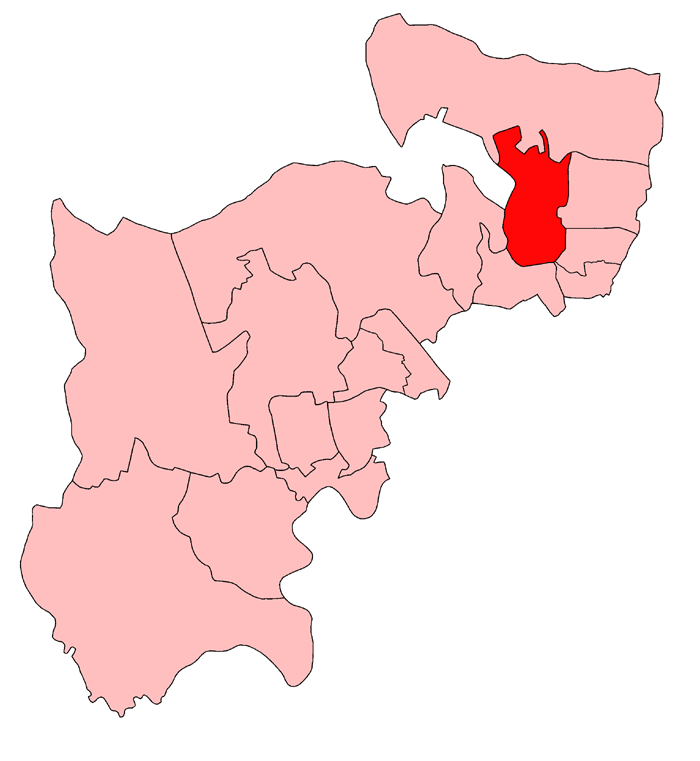
Wood Green in the county of Middlesex, showing boundaries used 1929-35

General Election 1929: Wood Green Electorate 71,445
Party	Candidate	Votes	%	±%
Unionist	Rt Hon. Godfrey Lampson Tennyson Locker-Lampson	24,821	47.6	
Liberal	Hew Thomson Fraser	14,995	28.7	
Labour	E P Bell	12,360	23.7	
Majority		9,826	18.9	
Turnout			73.0	
Unionist hold		Swing		

Following the formation of the National Government in 1931, there was another General Election. As the Liberals and Conservatives were partners in that government, the Wood Green Liberal Association decided not to oppose the sitting Conservative MP. At the following General Election, after the Liberals had moved into opposition, Fraser again contested Wood Green for the Liberals, but this time finished third.

General Election 1935: Wood Green Electorate 84,841
Party	Candidate	Votes	%	±%
Conservative	Arthur Beverley Baxter	36,384	62.0	
Labour	Miss Dorothy Woodman	14,561	24.8	
Liberal	Hew Thomson Fraser	7,711	13.2	
Majority		21,823	37.2	
Turnout		58,656	69.1	
Conservative hold		Swing		

After his death, his wife remained active for the Liberals in Wood Green.
