= Hew (disambiguation) =

Hew is a given name.

Hew or HEW may also refer to:

- Hewer, a type of miner
- Hewing, the creation of lumber from logs
- Health extension worker, or health extension officer
- Heworth Interchange, in Tyne and Wear, England, station code HEW
- United States Department of Health, Education, and Welfare
- Hanford Engineer Works, part of the Manhattan Project
  - HEW Proficiency Examination, A medical technologist certification that was administered by HEW

== See also ==
- Hews (disambiguation)
- Hue (disambiguation)
- Hugh (disambiguation)
- Huw (disambiguation)
