= 1810 in the United Kingdom =

Events from the year 1810 in the United Kingdom.

== Incumbents ==
- Monarch – George III
- Prime Minister – Spencer Perceval (Tory)
- Foreign Secretary – Richard Wellesley, 1st Marquess Wellesley
- Home Secretary – Richard Ryder
- Secretary of War – Earl of Liverpool

== Events ==
- 19 February – Radical John Gale Jones is called before the House of Commons for a breach of privilege, for which he is committed to Newgate Prison until 21 June.
- April – Rioting in London after the imprisonment in the Tower of London of Sir Francis Burdett, MP, charged with libel against Parliament after calling for reform of the House of Commons; he is released in June.
- 3 May – Lord Byron swims across the Hellespont in Turkey.
- 10 May – Rev. Henry Duncan opens the world's first commercial savings bank in Ruthwell, Dumfriesshire.
- 15 June – Radical journalist William Cobbett is found guilty of treasonous libel for an article in his Political Register critical of the flogging of militiamen and sentenced to two years' in Newgate Prison.
- 8 July – Vere Street Coterie: Police raid a "molly house" in London and arrest 27 men for sodomy or attempted sodomy; a man and a boy are eventually hanged on conviction.
- 20–27 August – Battle of Grand Port: The French force the Royal Navy fleet attempting to blockade a harbour on Isle de France (Mauritius) to surrender.
- October – King George III recognised as insane.
- 10 November – Paisley canal disaster in Scotland: A pleasure craft capsizes with the loss of 84 lives.
- 23 November – Actress Sarah Booth makes her first appearance at the Theatre Royal, Covent Garden in London.
- 26 November – Radical John Gale Jones is sentenced to twelve months' imprisonment for a libel on Lord Castlereagh.
- 29 November–3 December – Invasion of Isle de France: British forces oblige the French to surrender Isle de France (Mauritius).
- 14 December – The UK's strongest ever recorded tornado strikes Portsmouth with a top wind speed of 213 to 240 mph (343 to 386 km/h) (T8 (F4) rating).
- 19 December – Frigates HMS Nymphe and HMS Pallas are wrecked near Dunbar.
- 22 December – Eight crew of the Hoylake life-boat in the Mersey estuary are drowned on service; HMS Minotaur (1793) is wrecked on Texel in the West Frisian Islands with the loss of 500 lives.
- 27 December – Chartered East Indiaman Elizabeth is wrecked off Dunkirk with the loss of more than 360 lives.

=== Undated ===
- Commissioners of Woods, Forests and Land Revenues established by merging the former offices of Surveyor General of Woods, Forests, Parks, and Chases and Surveyor General of the Land Revenues of the Crown into a three-man commission.
- General Union of Spinners organises strike action to raise wages in the smaller cotton centres to the Manchester level.
- Chlorine named by Humphry Davy.
- Rev. Dr. William Pearson establishes Temple Grove School at East Sheen, perhaps the earliest preparatory school in the country.
- Sake Dean Mahomet opens the Hindoostane Coffee House, the first Indian restaurant in London.
- Palm oil sales from West Africa to Britain reach 1,000 tons.

=== Ongoing ===
- Napoleonic Wars, 1803–1815
- Anglo-Russian War, 1807–1812
- Peninsular War, 1808–1814

== Publications ==
- George Crabbe's epistolatory poem The Borough.
- Walter Scott's narrative poem The Lady of the Lake.
- Launch of the Carmarthen Journal, the oldest surviving newspaper in Wales.

== Births ==
- 12 January – John Dillwyn Llewelyn, botanist and pioneer photographer (died 1882)
- 15 January – John Evan Thomas, sculptor (died 1873)
- 19 January – Talhaiarn, poet and architect (died 1869)
- 24 January – Thomas Jones, missionary (died 1849)
- 10 March – Samuel Ferguson, poet and artist (died 1886)
- 27 March - William Hepworth Thompson, classical scholar (died 1886)
- 30 March – Pablo Fanque, black circus owner, popularized by The Beatles in song (died 1871)
- 5 April - Sir Henry Rawlinson, politician and Orientalist (died 1895)
- 21 April - Thomas Wright, antiquarian (died 1877)
- 17 July - Martin Farquhar Tupper, poet and writer (died 1889)
- 29 September – Elizabeth Gaskell, née Stevenson, novelist (died 1865)

== Deaths ==
- 26 January – James Martin, radical politician (born 1738)
- 24 February – Henry Cavendish, scientist (born 1731)
- 7 March – Cuthbert Collingwood, 1st Baron Collingwood, admiral (born 1748)
- 24 March – Mary Tighe, Anglo-Irish poet (born 1772)
- 3 April – Twm o'r Nant, Welsh dramatist and poet (born 1739)
- 26 April – John Metcalf, English roadbuilder (born 1717)
- 15 May – Francis Hews, Baptist preacher in Bedfordshire
- 21 May – Chevalier d'Eon, French-born diplomat, spy, soldier and transvestite (born 1728)
- 4 June – William Windham, Whig statesman (born 1750)
- 2 November – Princess Amelia, member of the Royal Family (born 1783)
- 15 December – Sarah Trimmer, writer for children (born 1741)
- probable – William Cruickshank, Scottish military surgeon, chemist and inventor
