= Hue (disambiguation) =

Hue is a perceptual attribute of color.

Hue or HUE may also refer to:

== Places ==
- Huế, formerly Thừa Thiên Huế province, a city and former capital of Vietnam
  - Huế (provincial city), capital of the former Thừa Thiên Huế province
  - Huế Railway Station
  - Archdiocese of Huế
- Hue, Ohio, an unincorporated community in the United States

== Education ==
- Huế University
- Hokkaido University of Education

== Games ==
- Battle for Hue (wargame), a 1973 board game simulating the Battle of Huế during the Vietnam War
- Hue (video game)

== Other uses ==
- Hue (name), a list of people with the surname, given name or nickname
- Hue (software), an open source SQL Cloud Editor for browsing, querying and visualizing data
- Huế Beer
- Hue FC, a Vietnamese football club
- Battle of Huế (1968), part of the Vietnam War
- hue, ISO 639-3 code for the San Francisco Del Mar dialect of the Huave language, spoken in Mexico
- Philips Hue, a line of LED color changing light bulbs
- Treaty of Huế (disambiguation), a list of treaties signed in Huế

== See also ==
- Hew (disambiguation)
- Hues (disambiguation)
- Huey (disambiguation)
- USS Hué City
