= Greater London Council leadership of Ken Livingstone =

Ken Livingstone, a British Labour Party politician, was the final leader of the Greater London Council (GLC). Livingstone took up the post on 17 May 1981, and remained in office until the GLC was abolished on 1 April 1986.

== Becoming leader of the GLC: 1979–1981 ==
Inspired by the Bennites, Livingstone planned a GLC take-over; on 18 October 1979, he called a meeting of Labour leftists entitled "Taking over the GLC", beginning publication of monthly newsletter, the London Labour Briefing. Focused on increasing leftist power in the London Labour Party, he urged socialists to stand as candidates in the upcoming GLC election. When the time came to choose who would lead London Labour in that election, Livingstone put his name down, but was challenged by the moderate Andrew McIntosh; in the 28 April 1980 vote, McIntosh beat Livingstone by 14 votes to 13. In September 1980, Livingstone separated from his wife Christine; they remained on amicable terms, holidaying in the Far East together. Moving into a small flat at 195 Randolph Avenue, Maida Vale with his pet reptiles and amphibians, he divorced in October 1982 and began a relationship with Kate Allen, chair of Camden Council Women's Committee.

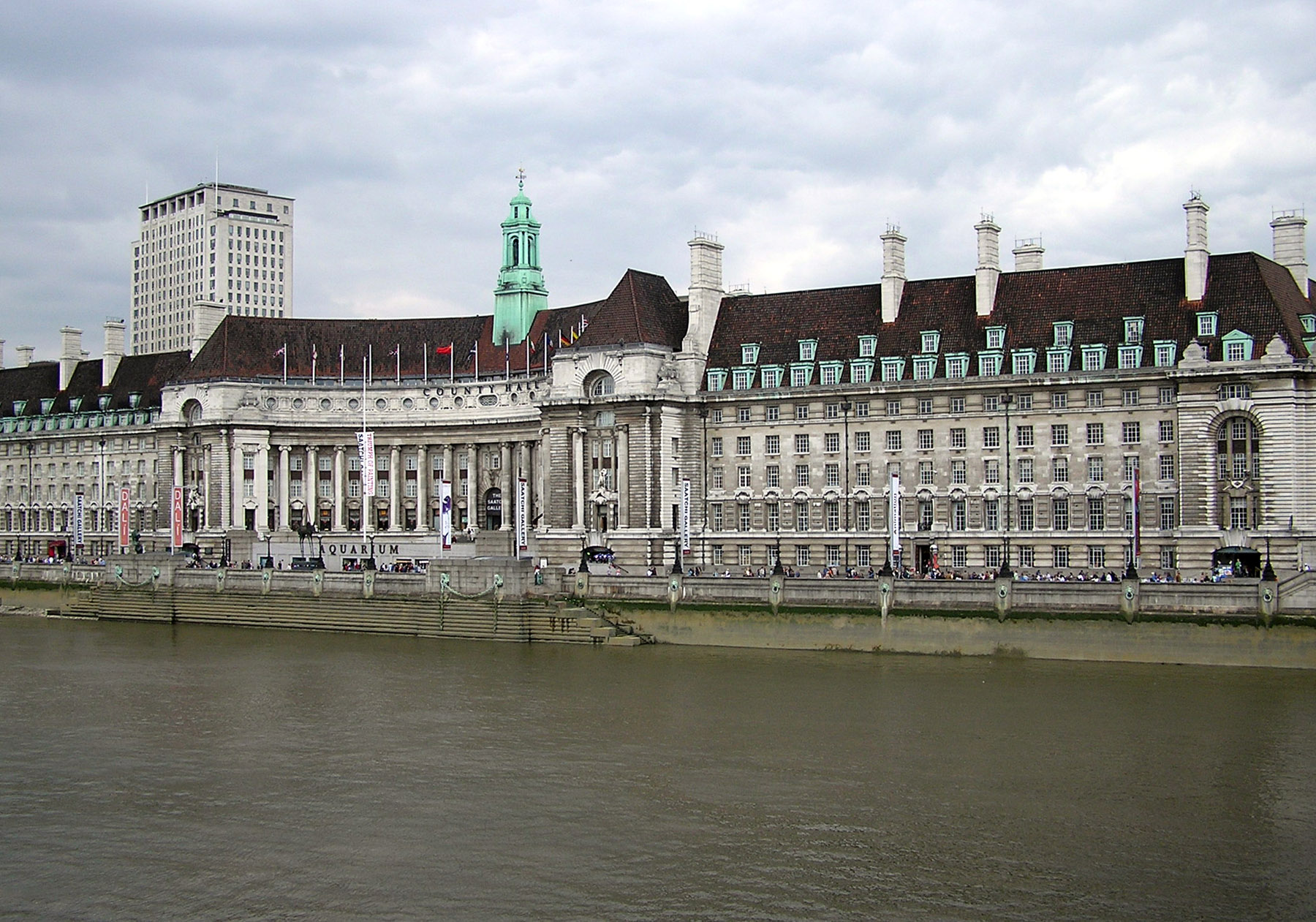
County Hall in Lambeth, then home of the Greater London Council.

Livingstone turned his attention to achieving a GLC Labour victory, exchanging his safe-seat in Hackney North and Stoke Newington for the marginal Inner London seat at Paddington; in May 1981 he won the seat by 2,397 votes. As he was supporting leftist candidates across London, Horace Cutler and the Conservatives learned of Livingstone's plans, proclaiming that a GLC Labour victory would lead to a takeover of London by "Marxists and extremists". The rightist press picked up the story, with the Daily Express using the headline of "Why We Must Stop These Red Wreckers", in which Cutler warned of a potential communist takeover of Britain. Such scaremongering was ineffective, and the GLC election on 6 May 1981 proved a victory for Labour, with McIntosh installed as Head of the GLC; within 24 hours he would be deposed by members of his own party, replaced by Livingstone.

On 7 May, Livingstone called a caucus of his supporters; announcing his intent to challenge McIntosh's leadership, he invited those assembled to stand for other GLC posts. The meeting ended at 4:45pm having agreed on a full slate of candidates. At 5 o'clock, McIntosh held a GLC Labour meeting; the attendees called an immediate leadership election, in which Livingstone defeated him by 30 votes to 20. The entire left caucus slate was then elected. The next day, a leftist coup deposed Sir Ashley Bramall on the Inner London Education Authority (ILEA), replacing him with Bryn Davies; the left group now controlled both the GLC and the ILEA.

McIntosh proclaimed the GLC coup illegitimate, asserting that Labour was in danger from a leftist take-over. The mainstream right-wing press criticised the coup; the Daily Mail called Livingstone a "left wing extremist", and The Sun nicknamed him "Red Ken", stating his victory meant "full-steam-ahead red-blooded Socialism for London." The Financial Times issued a "warning" that leftists could use such tactics to take control of the government, when "the erosion of our democracy will surely begin." Thatcher joined the rallying call, proclaiming that leftists like Livingstone had "no time for parliamentary democracy", but were plotting "To impose upon this nation a tyranny which the peoples of Eastern Europe yearn to cast aside."

== Leader of the GLC: 1981–1983 ==
Entering County Hall as GLC leader on 8 May 1981, Livingstone initiated changes; he converted the building's Freemasonic temple into a meeting room, removed many of the GLC members and senior officers' privileges by phasing out the use of chauffeurs, removing the annual international holiday and unsuccessfully attempting to stop the supply of free alcohol. He initiated an open-door policy allowing citizens to enter County Hall to raise issues or hold meetings in the committee rooms free of charge. County Hall gained the nickname of "the People's Palace"; Livingstone took great pleasure watching the disgust expressed by some Conservative GLC members when non-members began using the building's restaurant. In the London Labour Briefing, Livingstone announced "London's ours! After the most vicious GLC election of all time, the Labour Party has won a working majority on a radical socialist programme." He stated that their job was to "sustain a holding operation until such time as the Tory [Conservative] government can be brought down and replaced by a left-wing Labour government." There was a perception among Livingstone's allies that they constituted the genuine opposition to Thatcher's government, with Foot's Labour leadership dismissed as ineffectual; they hoped Benn would soon replace him.

"There is nothing that happens to you at any stage in your life that can prepare you for the British Press in full hue and cry. As a socialist I started out with the lowest possible opinion of Fleet Street and was amazed to discover that they managed to sink even lower than I expected... I would spend hours carefully explaining our policies only to open the paper the next morning and see instead a smear about my sex-life, alleged personality defects or some completely fabricated account of a meeting or a split that never actually happened."

— Ken Livingstone, 1987.

There was a widespread public perception that Livingstone's GLC leadership was illegitimate, while the mainstream British media remained resolutely hostile to the hard left. Livingstone received the levels of national press attention normally reserved for senior Members of Parliament. A press interview was arranged with the Max Hastings for the Evening Standard, in which Livingstone was portrayed as affable but ruthless and "lacking in humanity." Kelvin MacKenzie, editor for The Sun, took a particular interest in Livingstone, establishing a reporting team to "dig up the dirt" on him; they were unable to uncover any scandalous information, focusing on his love of amphibians, a personality trait mocked by other media sources. The satirical journal Private Eye referred to him as "Ken Leninspart" after Vladimir Lenin, proceeding to erroneously claim that Livingstone received funding from the Libyan Jamahiriya; suing them for libel, in November 1983 the journal apologised, giving Livingstone £15,000 in damages in an out-of-court settlement.

During 1982, Livingstone made new appointments to the GLC governance, with John McDonnell appointed key chair of finance and Valerie Wise chair of the new Women's Committee, while Sir Ashley Bramall became GLC chairman and Tony McBrearty was appointed chair of housing. Others stayed in their former positions, including Dave Wetzel as transport chair and Mike Ward as chair of industry; thus was created what biographer John Carvel described as "the second Livingstone administration", leading to a "more calm and supportive environment". Turning his attention once more to Parliament, Livingstone attempted to get selected as the Labour candidate for the constituency of Brent East, a place which he felt an "affinity" for and where several friends lived. At the time, the Brent East Labour Party was in strife as competing factions battled for control, with Livingstone attempting to gain the support of both the hard and soft left. Securing a significant level of support from local party members, he nonetheless failed to apply for candidacy in time, and so the incumbent centrist Reg Freeson was once more selected as Labour candidate for Brent East. A subsequent vote at the council meeting revealed that 52 local Labour members would have voted for Livingstone, with only 2 for Freeson and 3 abstentions. Nevertheless, in the 1983 United Kingdom general election, Freeson went on to win the Brent East constituency for Labour. In 1983, Livingstone began co-presenting a late night television chat show with Janet Street-Porter for London Weekend Television.

=== Fares Fair and transport policy ===
The Greater London Labour Manifesto for the 1981 elections, although written under McIntosh's leadership, had been determined by a special conference of the London Labour Party in October 1980 in which Livingstone's speech had been decisive on transport policy. The manifesto focused on job creation schemes and cutting London Transport fares, and it was to these issues that Livingstone's administration turned. One of the primary manifesto focuses had been a pledge known as Fares Fair, which focused on reducing London Underground fares and freezing them at that lower rate. Based on a fare freeze implemented by the South Yorkshire Metropolitan County Council in 1975, it was widely considered to be a moderate and mainstream policy by Labour, which it was hoped would get more Londoners using public transport, thereby reducing congestion. In October 1981, the GLC implemented their policy, cutting London Transport fares by 32%; to fund the move, the GLC planned to increase the London rates.

The legality of the Fares Fair policy was challenged by Dennis Barkway, Conservative leader of the Bromley London Borough Council, who complained that his constituents were having to pay for cheaper fares on the London Underground when it didn't operate in their borough. Although the Divisional Court initially found in favour of the GLC, Bromley Council took the issue to a court of appeal, where three judges – Lord Denning, Lord Justice Oliver and Lord Justice Watkins – reversed the previous decision, finding in favour of Bromley Council on 10 November. They proclaimed that the Fares Fair policy was illegal because the GLC was expressly forbidden from choosing to run London Transport at a deficit, even if this was in the perceived interest of Londoners. The GLC appealed this decision, taking the case to the House of Lords; on 17 December five Law Lords unanimously ruled in favour of Bromley Council, putting a permanent end to the Fares Fair policy. GLC transport chairman Dave Wetzel labelled the judges "Vandals in Ermine" while Livingstone maintained his belief that the judicial decision was politically motivated.

Initially presenting a motion to the GLC Labour groups that they refuse to comply with the judicial decision and continue with the policy regardless, but was out-voted by 32-22; many commentators claimed that Livingstone had only been bluffing in order to save face among the Labour Left. Instead, Livingstone got on board with a campaign known as "Keep Fares Fair" in order to bring about a change in the law that would make the Fares Fair policy legal; an alternate movement, "Can't Pay, Won't Pay", accused Livingstone of being a sell-out and insisted that the GLC proceed with its policies regardless of their legality. One aspect of the London Transport reforms was however maintained; the new system of flat fares within ticket zones, and the inter-modal Travelcard ticket continues as the basis of the ticketing system. The GLC then put together new measures in the hope to reduce London Transport fares by a more modest amount, 25%, taking them back to roughly the price that they were when Livingstone's administration took office; it was ruled legal in January 1983, and subsequently implemented.

=== GLEB and nuclear disarmament ===
Livingstone and Mike Cooley founded the Greater London Enterprise Board (GLEB) to create employment by investing in the industrial regeneration of London, with the funds provided by the council, its workers' pension fund and the financial markets. Livingstone and Cooley later claimed that GLC bureaucrats obstructed much of what GLEB tried to achieve. Other policies implemented by the Labour Left also foundered. Attempts to prevent the sale-off of GLC council housing largely failed, in part due to the strong opposition from the Conservative government. ILEA attempted to carry through with its promise to cut the price of school meals in the capital from 35p to 25p, but was forced to abandon its plans following legal advice that the councillors could be made to pay the surcharge and disqualified from public office.

The Livingstone administration took a strong stance on the issue of nuclear disarmament, proclaiming London a "nuclear-free zone". On 20 May 1981, the GLC halted its annual spending of £1 million on nuclear war defence plans, with Livingstone's deputy, Illtyd Harrington, proclaiming that "we are challenging... the absurd cosmetic approach to Armaggedon." They published the names of the 3000 politicians and administrators who had been earmarked for survival in underground bunkers in the event of a nuclear strike on London. Thatcher's government remained highly critical of these moves, putting out a propaganda campaign explaining their argument for the necessity of Britain's nuclear deterrent to counter the Soviet Union.

=== Socialist policies ===
"Arguing that politics had long been the near-exclusive preserve of white middle-aged men, the GLC began an attempt to open itself to representations from other groups, principally from women, the working-class, ethnic minorities and homosexuals but also from children and the elderly. This was a real break from traditional politics as practised centrally by both major parties... and it attracted hostility from all sides."

— Historian Alwyn W. Turner, 2010.

A socialist, Livingstone's administration advocated measures to improve the lives of disadvantaged minorities within London, including women, the disabled, homosexuals and ethnic minorities, who together made up a sizeable percentage of the city's population; what Reg Race called "the Rainbow Coalition". The GLC allocated a small percentage of its expenditure on funding minority community groups, including the London Gay Teenage Group, English Collective of Prostitutes, Women Against Rape, Lesbian Line, A Woman's Place and Rights of Women. Believing these groups could initiate social change, the GLC increased its annual funding of voluntary organisations from £6 million in 1980 to £50 million in 1984. They provided loans, most notably to the Sheba Feminist Publishers, coming under a barrage of press criticism, who claimed the press' works were pornographic.

In July 1981, Livingstone founded three groups; the Ethnic Minorities Committee, an organisation with a budget of £2.9 million, the Police Committee, and the Gay and Lesbian Working Party. 11 months later, in June 1982, a Women's Committee was established. Believing the Metropolitan Police to be a racist organisation, he appointed Paul Boateng to head the Police Committee. Considering the police a highly political organisation, he publicly remarked that "When you canvas police flats at election time, you find that they are either Conservatives who think of Thatcher as a bit of a pinko or they are National Front."

The Conservatives and mainstream rightist press were largely critical of these measures, considering them symptomatic of what they derogatorily termed the "loony left". Claiming that these only served "fringe" interests, their criticisms often exhibited racist, homophobic and sexist sentiment. A number of journalists fabricated stories designed to discredit Livingstone and the "loony left" in the eyes of the electorate, for instance claiming that the GLC made its workers drink only Nicaraguan coffee in solidarity with the country's socialist Sandinista government, and that Haringey Council leader Bernie Grant had banned the use of the term "black bin liner" and the rhyme "Baa Baa Black Sheep" because they were perceived as racially insensitive. Writing in 2008, BBC reporter Andrew Hosken noted that although most of the Livingstone GLC administration's policies were ultimately a failure, its role in helping to change social attitudes towards women and minorities in London remained its "enduring legacy".

==== Scandal: Republicanism and Ireland ====
Invited to the Wedding of Charles, Prince of Wales, and Lady Diana Spencer at St Paul's Cathedral on 29 July 1981, Livingstone – a republican critical of the monarchy – wished the couple well but turned down the offer, remarking that he intended "to pull back from ceremonial functions in order to concentrate on the work for which the group had been elected." The refusal was leaked to the press, who were further enraged when he permitted Irish republican protesters from the H-Block Armagh Committee to hold a 48-hour vigil and fast on the steps of County Hall throughout the wedding celebrations, during which they launched 100 black balloons over the city. His administration supported the People's March for Jobs, a demonstration of 500 protestors against unemployment who marched to London from Liverpool, Llanelli and Huddersfield, allowing those involved to sleep in County Hall for two nights in May and catering for them. Costing £19,000, critics argued that Livingstone's regime was illegally using public money for their own political causes. The GLC orchestrated a propaganda campaign against Thatcher's government, in January 1982 erecting a sign on the top of County Hall – a building clearly visible from the Houses of Parliament – stating the number of unemployed in London. Initially set at 326,238, it was updated every month as a reminder of the high levels of unemployment in Thatcher's Britain. Later that year, he caused further press controversy when he stated that to a certain extent, "everyone is bisexual", at the Harrow Gay Unity Group on 18 August.

Becoming estranged from the publishers of the London Labour Briefing, in September 1981, Livingstone began production of weekly newspaper, the Labour Herald, co-edited with Ted Knight and Matthew Warburton. The Labour Herald was published by Astmoor Litho Ltd, a press owned by a Trotskyist organisation known as the Workers Revolutionary Party (WRP), who had financed it with funding from the Arab socialist governments of Libya and Iraq. Livingstone became an ally of the WRP's leader, Gerry Healy, a controversial move among British socialists, many of whom disapproved of Healy's violent nature and criminal past; Livingstone maintained that he had "a straightforward commercial relationship" with Healy and that he published through the WRP because they offered the cheapest rate. In 1985, the WRP ousted Healy as their leader after he was exposed as a sexual predator; the Labour Herald subsequently folded.

"This morning the Sun presents the most odious man in Britain. Take a bow, Mr Livingstone, socialist leader of the Greater London Council. In just a few months since he appeared on the national scene, he has quickly become a joke. But no one can laugh at him any more. The joke has turned sour, sick and obscene. For Mr Livingstone steps forward as the defender and the apologist of the criminal, murderous activities of the IRA."

— The Sun lambasts Livingstone after his support for Irish republicanism.

A supporter of Irish reunification, Livingstone had connections with the left-wing Irish republican party Sinn Féin and on 21 July, met with Mrs Alice McElwee, the mother of an imprisoned member of the Provisional Irish Republican Army (IRA), Thomas McElwee, then taking part in the 1981 Irish hunger strike. Mrs McElwee had originally been invited to speak to the London Labour group on the situation of the hunger strikers by GLC councillor Andy Harris, a member of the Labour Committee on Ireland, and Livingstone took the time to privately meet with her. That same day, Livingstone publicly proclaimed his support for those prisoners on hunger strike, claiming that the British government's fight against the IRA was not "some sort of campaign against terrorism" but was in fact "the last colonial war." He was heavily criticised for this meeting and his statements in the mainstream press, while Prime Minister Thatcher claimed that his comments constituted "the most disgraceful statement I have ever heard." He would soon after meet with the three sons of Yvonne Dunlop, an Irish Protestant who had been killed in McElwee's bomb attack, on their visit to London.

On 10 October, the IRA bombed London's Chelsea Barracks, killing 2 and injuring 40, including 23 soldiers. Denouncing the attack, Livingstone informed members of the Cambridge University Tory Reform Group that it was a misunderstanding to view the IRA as "criminals or lunatics" because of their strong political motives and that "violence will recur again and again as long as we are in Ireland." The mainstream press criticising him for these comments, The Sun labeling him "the most odious man in Britain". In response, Livingstone held a press conference, proclaiming that the press coverage had been "ill-founded, utterly out of context and distorted", reiterating his opposition both to the IRA's attacks and to British rule in Northern Ireland. Anti-Livingstone pressure mounted and on 15 October he was publicly attacked in the street, being sprayed with red aerosol paint by members of The Friends of Ulster. In a second incident, Livingstone was attacked by far right skinheads shouting "commie bastard" at the Three Horseshoes Pub in Hampstead. Known as "Green Ken" among Ulster Unionists, Unionist paramilitary Michael Stone of the Ulster Defence Association plotted to kill Livingstone, only abandoning the plan when he became convinced that the security services were onto him.

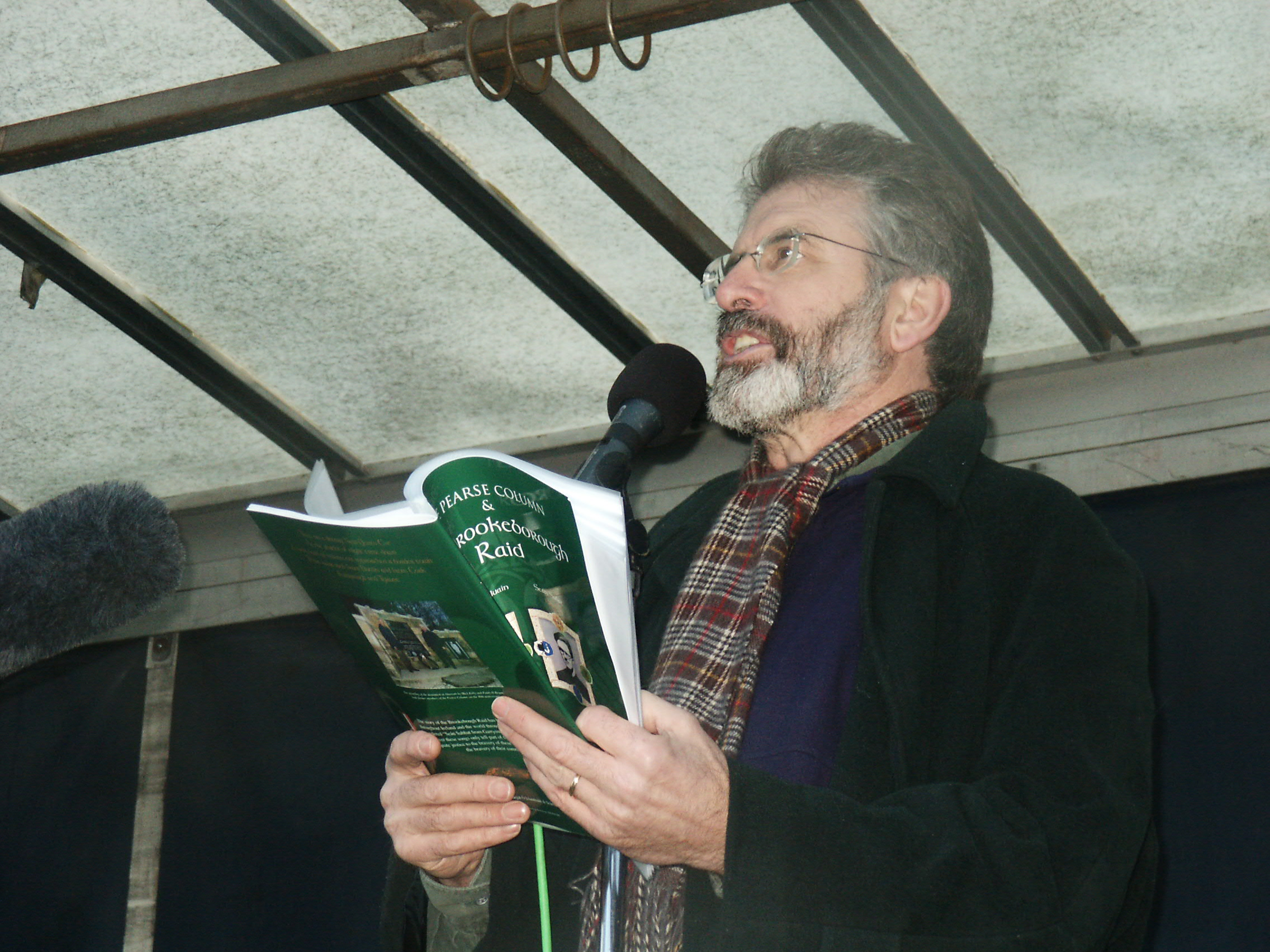
Livingstone's willingness to meet with Irish republican leader Gerry Adams (above, pictured in 2001), caused outrage within his own party and the British press.

Livingstone agreed to meet Gerry Adams, Sinn Féin President and IRA-supporter, after Adams was invited to London by Labour members of the Troops Out campaign in December 1982. The same day as the invitation was made, the Irish National Liberation Army (INLA) bombed The Droppin Well bar in Ballykelly, County Londonderry, killing 11 soldiers and 6 civilians; in the aftermath, Livingstone was pressured to cancel the meeting. Expressing his horror at the bombing, Livingstone insisted that the meeting proceed, for Adams had no connection with the INLA, but Conservative Home Secretary Willie Whitelaw banned Adams' entry to Britain with the 1976 Prevention of Terrorism (Temporary Provisions) Act. On 26 and 27 February 1983, Livingstone visited Adams in his constituency of West Belfast in Northern Ireland, receiving a hero's welcome from the local republican community. In July 1983, Adams finally came to London on the invitation of Livingstone and MP Jeremy Corbyn, allowing him to present his views to a mainstream British audience through televised interviews. On 26 August, Livingstone was interviewed on Irish state radio, proclaiming that Britain's 800-year occupation of Ireland was more destructive than the Holocaust; he was publicly criticised by Labour members and the press.

Courting further controversy, during the Falklands War of 1982, during which the United Kingdom battled Argentina for control of the Falkland Islands, Livingstone stated his belief that the islands rightfully belonged to the Argentinian people, but not the military junta then ruling the country. Upon British victory, he sarcastically remarked that "Britain had finally been able to beat the hell out of a country smaller, weaker and even worse governed than we were." Challenging the Conservative government's militarism, the GLC proclaimed 1983 to be "Peace Year", solidifying ties with the Campaign for Nuclear Disarmament (CND) in order to advocate international nuclear disarmament, a measure opposed by the Thatcher government. In keeping with this pacifistic outlook, they banned the Territorial Army from marching past County Hall that year. The GLC then proclaimed 1984 to be "Anti-Racism Year". In July 1985, the GLC twinned London with the Nicaraguan city of Managua, then under the control of the socialist Sandinista National Liberation Front. The press also continued to criticise the Livingstone administration's funding of volunteer groups that they perceived represented only "fringe interests". As Livingstone biographer Andrew Hosken remarked, "by far the most contentious grant" was given in February 1983 to a group called Babies Against the Bomb, founded by a group of mothers who had united to campaign against nuclear weapons.

Members of the London Labour groups chastised Livingstone for his controversial statements, believing them detrimental to the party, leading Labour members and supporters to defect to the Social Democratic Party (SDP). Many highlighted Labour's failure to secure the seat in the 1981 Croydon North West by-election as a sign of Labour's prospects under Livingstone. Some called for Livingstone's removal, but Michael Foot's Trotskyist assistant Una Cooze defended Livingstone's position to her boss. Television and radio outlets welcomed Livingstone on for interviews; described by biographer John Carvel as having "one of the best television styles of any contemporary politician", Livingstone used this medium to speak to a wider audience, gaining widespread public support, something Carvell attributed to his "directness, self-deprecation, colourful language, complete unflappability under fire and lack of pomposity", coupled with genuinely popular policies such as Fares Fair.

== Abolition of the GLC: 1983–1986 ==
"Whatever the long-term achievements of Livingstone's administration, there is no question that its aggression towards the government and the Establishment ultimately spelled doom for the GLC. In the eyes of the government and the media, Livingstone started badly and got worse. Within eight months, he was in deep crisis and within two years, Margaret Thatcher had started the wheels in motion for abolition. Such was the backlash by judges, civil servants, politicians and journalists that Livingstone failed not only in the key objective of bringing down Thatcher but also in implementing many of his policies. It would lay Livingstone open to the allegation that he had laid the GLC at the sacrificial altar of his ambition."

— Biographer Andrew Hosken (2008).

The 1983 general election proved disastrous for Labour. Obtaining their worst results since the Second World War, much of their support went to the Social Democrat-Liberal Alliance, while Thatcher entered her second term in office. Accepting this loss, Foot stepped down to be succeeded by Neil Kinnock, a man Livingstone considered "repellent". Livingstone publicly asserted that Labour's electoral failure was due to the leading role that the party's capitalist right wing had played under Foot's leadership. In order to gain the support of the nation's working class, he argued, the party had to promote a socialist program of "national reconstruction", overseeing the nationalisation of banks and major industry and allowing for the investment in new development.

Considering it a waste of rate payer's money, the Conservative government was keen to abolish the GLC and devolve control to the London borough councils, stating its intention to do so in its 1983 electoral manifesto. Secretary of State for Employment Norman Tebbit, lambasted the GLC as "Labour-dominated, high-spending and at odds with the government's view of the world"; Livingstone commented that there was "a huge gulf between the cultural values of the GLC Labour group and everything that Mrs Thatcher considered right and proper." The government felt confident that there was sufficient opposition to Livingstone's GLC administration that they could abolish the entire body: according to a MORI poll undertaken for the Evening Standard in April 1983, 58% of Londoners were dissatisfied with Livingstone, compared with 26% satisfied with him.

Attempting to fight the proposals, the GLC devoted £11 million to a three-pronged campaign led by Reg Race focusing on press campaigning, advertising and parliamentary lobbying. The campaign sent Livingstone on a £845,000 party roadshow conference, in which he successfully convinced the Liberal and Social Democratic parties to oppose abolition. Using the slogan "say no to no say", the GLC team publicly highlighted that if the Conservative's proposals were passed, London would be the only capital city in Western Europe without a directly elected body. The GLC campaign proved successful, with polls indicating majority support among Londoners for retaining the Council, and on 29 March 1984, 20,000 public servants held a 24-hour strike in support. The government nevertheless remained committed to the cause of abolition. In order to become law, the bill had to have three readings in each of the Houses of Parliament, and could have been defeated if it was voted down in any of the six readings. The third and final readings took place on 28 June 1984, passing the Local Government Act 1985 with 237 votes in favour and 217 against. The GLC was formally abolished at midnight on 31 March 1986.
