= Huw (disambiguation) =

Huw or HUW may refer to:

- Huw, a Welsh given name
- Hukumina language, spoken in Indonesia, ISO 639-3 language code huw
- Humaitá Airport, in Amazonas, Brazil, IATA airport code HUW

== See also ==
- Hew (disambiguation)
- Hugh (disambiguation)
