= Hews =

Hews or HEWS may refer to:

- The action of hewing
- Chay Hews (born 1976), Australian Rules Football player
- Francis Hews (1768–1810), English Baptist preacher
- Health extension workers, abbreviated HEWs

== See also ==
- Hew (disambiguation)
- Hewes, a surname
