= Hus =

Hus or HUS may refer to:

- Croatian Trade Union Association (Hrvatska Udruga Sindikata)
- Hemolytic–uremic syndrome, a group of blood disorders characterized by low red blood cells, acute kidney injury, and low platelets
- House (Hus), a single-unit residential building
- Huastec language (ISO 639-3 code: hus), spoken by the Téenek people living in rural areas of San Luis Potosí and northern Veracruz
- Hughes Airport (Alaska) (IATA code: HUS), a state-owned public-use airport
- HUS, nickname for the Sikorsky H-34 American piston-engined military helicopter
- HUS Helsinki University Hospital, Finland

== People ==
- Charles Hus, dit Millet (1738–1802), political figure in Lower Canada
- Hus family, 18th-century French dynasty of ballet dancers and actors
- Eugène Hus (1758–1823), Franco-Belgian ballet dancer and choreographer
- Jan Hus (c. 1370 – 6 July 1415), Czech theologian and philosopher
- Jean-Baptiste Hus (1736–1805), French ballet master
- Jorgen Hus (born 1989), Canadian gridiron football long snapper
- Tim Hus, Canadian country/folk singer
- Walter Hus (born 1959), Belgian composer and musician
- Husein "Hus" Hasanefendić (born 1954), Croatian and Yugoslav musician and producer

== See also ==
- Hoos, a surname
- Huss (disambiguation)
