= Joyce Butler =

British politician

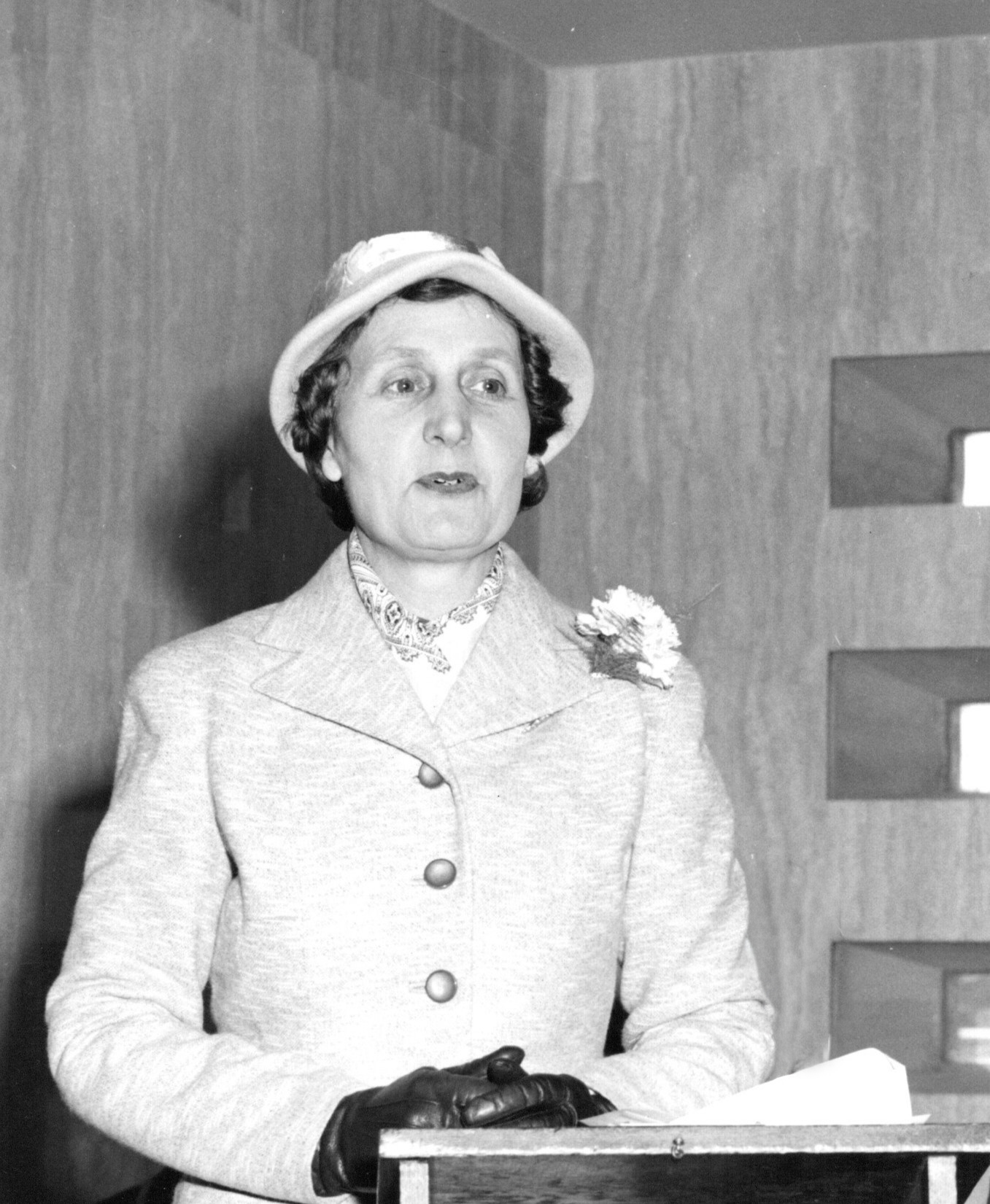
- Joyce Butler at the Civic Centre in Wood Green, May 1958

Member of Parliament for Wood Green
- In office 26 May 1955 – 7 April 1979
- Preceded by: William Irving
- Succeeded by: Reg Race

Personal details
- Born: Joyce Wells; 13 December 1910
- Died: 2 January 1992 (aged 81)
- Party: Labour Co-operative Party
- Spouse: Vic Butler
- Children: 2
- Education: Woodbrooke College

Joyce Shore Butler (née Wells; 13 December 1910 – 2 January 1992) was a British Labour Co-operative politician. She was the long serving MP for Wood Green and was the first woman to chair an ad hoc committee.

== Early life ==
Joyce Butler was born in 1910 as the second youngest of six to Florence Maude and Edward Wells, a photographer. Butler was educated at King Edward's High School, Birmingham.

She was raised as a Quaker and worked briefly at the Society of Friend's Woodbrooke College.

Butler belonged to the Labour Party and the Co-operative society and began organising for consumer causes through the Co-operative Women's Guild.

== Career ==
Butler became a councillor on Wood Green Borough Council in 1947, serving until the borough's abolition in 1965. She was chairman of the Housing committee, overseeing major council efforts to construct housing post-war, and in 1954 became Leader of Wood Green Council. She was an alderman and the first chairman of the new London Borough of Haringey in 1964.

Butler was first elected to Parliament at the 1955 general election, for the Wood Green constituency. She served as Parliamentary Private Secretary to the Minister of Land and Natural Resources 1965-67 but held no front-bench position. She served as vice-chair of the Parliamentary Labour Party (1965-1970) and chairman of the Co-operative Party MPs. She also served as vice-chairman of the Labour parliamentary housing and local government group from 1959 to 1964. She retired from Parliament at the 1979 general election.

== Interests ==
Butler was an active back-bencher, frequently raising questions in parliament on environmental and consumer issues. She often spoke on a range of health issues and asked the first parliamentary questions about the thalidomide drug.

In 1964 Butler founded the Women's Cervical Cancer Control Campaign (later the Women's National Cancer Control Campaign). With her parliamentary platform, Butler worked to make screening and early detection a national issue, stating in 1964:

"Since all women at risk from pre-cancer will only be discovered and treated if mass screening facilities are available in all parts of the country, will [The Minister of Health] see what he can do to speed up this increase in training facilities? Every day that passes is vital and it is possible, if the service can be speeded up, to avoid completely this scourge of women."

In 1976, she introduced a Bill to create a statutory register of all osteopaths who followed a recognized course of study.

Butler also served as President of the National Antivaccination League.

Butler's "most important achievement" was introducing the first bill to Parliament seeking to outlaw discrimination against women "in education, employment, and social and public life". Working across party lines with women MPs such as Lena Jeger and Irene Ward, Butler was outspoken about the need for a board with sufficient powers to review and uphold women's rights in cases of sex discrimination, as she stated in 1968:

"Is my right hon. Friend [Prime Minister Harold Wilson] aware that women are fed up with being exploited as pretty birds when they are young and as "silly moos" when they get older as a substitute for equal human rights now, and that there is need for a board of this kind to which cases of sex discrimination can be referred if needed?"

Under the 10 minute rule, she raised the issue as a private members' bill four times between 1968-1971 but failed to obtain a second reading. Her Bill would form the basis of the Labour Government's Sex Discrimination Act (1975).

She remained committed to women's rights and during her last term in Parliament chaired a committee investigating violence against women and children.

Following her retirement in 1979, she remained a leading member in a number of organisations, such as the London Passenger Action Confederation, the Fawcett Society, the Hornsey Housing Trust, and Tottenham Hotspur ladies' football team.

== Personal life ==
In 1947, she married Abraham Victor 'Vic' Butler, a Co-operative Party worker who became a councillor, the first mayor of the London Borough of Haringey and a parliamentary candidate. They had two children.

Parliament of the United Kingdom
Preceded by William Irving	Member of Parliament for Wood Green; 1955–1979	Succeeded by Reg Race
