= Harri Tudor Rhys =

Harri Tudor Rhys (died September 1947) was a British Labour Party politician.

Rhys became active in the Labour Party in Wood Green in the mid-1900s. He was elected to the council, and stood as a candidate in Wood Green at the 1918, 1922 and 1924 United Kingdom general elections, taking second place on each occasion, but never coming close to election. He remained on the council until his death, in 1947.

Civic offices
Preceded by Frederic George Holmes	Mayor of Wood Green; 1935–1936	Succeeded by Archibald John Blue
