= Hughs =

Hughs may refer to:

- the plural of Hugh
- Ruth R. Hughs (born 1971/1972), American lawyer and politician

== See also ==
- Hughes (surname)
- St Hugh's (disambiguation)
- Witham St Hughs, village in Lincolnshire, England
