= Huss =

Huss or HUSS may refer to:

== Companies ==
- HUSS Park Attractions, a German amusement ride manufacturer

== Places ==
- Huss Township, Minnesota, United States

== People with the surname ==
- a Swedish noble family, which is divided into two main groups
- Andreas Huss (born 1950), Swiss chess master
- Henry Holden Huss (1862–1953), American composer, pianist and music teacher
- Hugo Jan Huss (1934–2006), Romanian-born orchestra conductor and music director
- Jan Huss (14th century–1415), Czech Catholic priest, philosopher, reformer, and master at Charles University in Prague
- Pierre J. Huss (1903–1966), American journalist and author
- Toby Huss (born 1966), American actor
- Adam Huss (born 1977), American television and film actor, producer, casting director, singer and writer
- Boaz Huss (born 1959), professor of Kabbalah
- Daniel Huss (born 1979), Luxembourgish footballer
- Darrin Huss (born 1965), vocalist and lyricist of the Canadian dark synthpop band Psyche
- Evi Huss, German slalom canoer who competed from the early 1990s to the early 2000s
- Judson Huss (1942–2008), American-born painter and sculptor
- Nicolas Huss (born 1964), French businessman
- Søren Huss (born 1975), Danish singer, songwriter and musician
- Stephen Huss (musician) (born 1967), founder of the duo Psyche
- Stephen Huss (tennis) (born 1975), Australian professional tennis player
- Andrew Hussie (born 1979), The creator of mspaintadventures

== People with the forename ==
- Huss Garbiya actor in Sex Lives of the Potato Men and Some Voices films

== Other ==
- Various fish species including Galeorhinus, Mustelus, Scyliorhinus, Galeus melastomus, Squalus acanthias – also known as Spiny dogfish or "Rock salmon" in the UK fish and chip trade
- A "Huss Number" is relevant to meteorite identification
- Hemolytic-uremic syndrome (HUS), a urinary tract disease
- Pleasure or joy on the Teletext videogame page Digitiser
- A trademark term yelled by wrestlers "The Bezerker" John Nord and Bruiser Brody
- "Huss valley" is an internet meme that went popular in 2026
