= Hue (name) =

Hue is a surname and given name and occasionally a nickname. Notable people with the name include:

Surname:

- Armand Thomas Hue de Miromesnil (1723–1796), French government minister
- André Hue (1923–2005), Anglo-French SOE agent.
- Clement Hue (1778 or 1779–1861), British physician
- Douglas Sang Hue (1931–2014), Jamaican cricket umpire
- Georges Hüe (1858–1948), French composer
- Jermaine Hue (born 1978), Jamaican footballer
- José de Carvajal y Hué (1835–1899), Spanish lawyer, economist, writer and politician
- Robert Hue (born 1946), French communist politician
- Steevy Chong Hue (born 1990), Tahitian footballer
- Young Soon Hue (born 1963), South Korean ballet choreographer

Given name:

- Hue de Rotelande, late 12th century Cambro-Norman poet
- Hue de la Ferté (fl. 1220–35), French troubadour
- Hue Hollins (1942–2013), former National Basketball Association referee
- Hue Lee (1922–2019), Chinese singer
- Hue Montgomery, singer of the Foundations

Nickname:

- Huey Hue Jackson (born 1965), American National Football League head coach

== See also ==
- Nguyễn Huệ (1753–1792), second emperor of the Tây Sơn dynasty of Vietnam
- Heo, sometimes spelled Hue, a Korean family name
- Hue (disambiguation)
- Hues (disambiguation)
