= R. D. Blumenfeld =

American journalist and editor

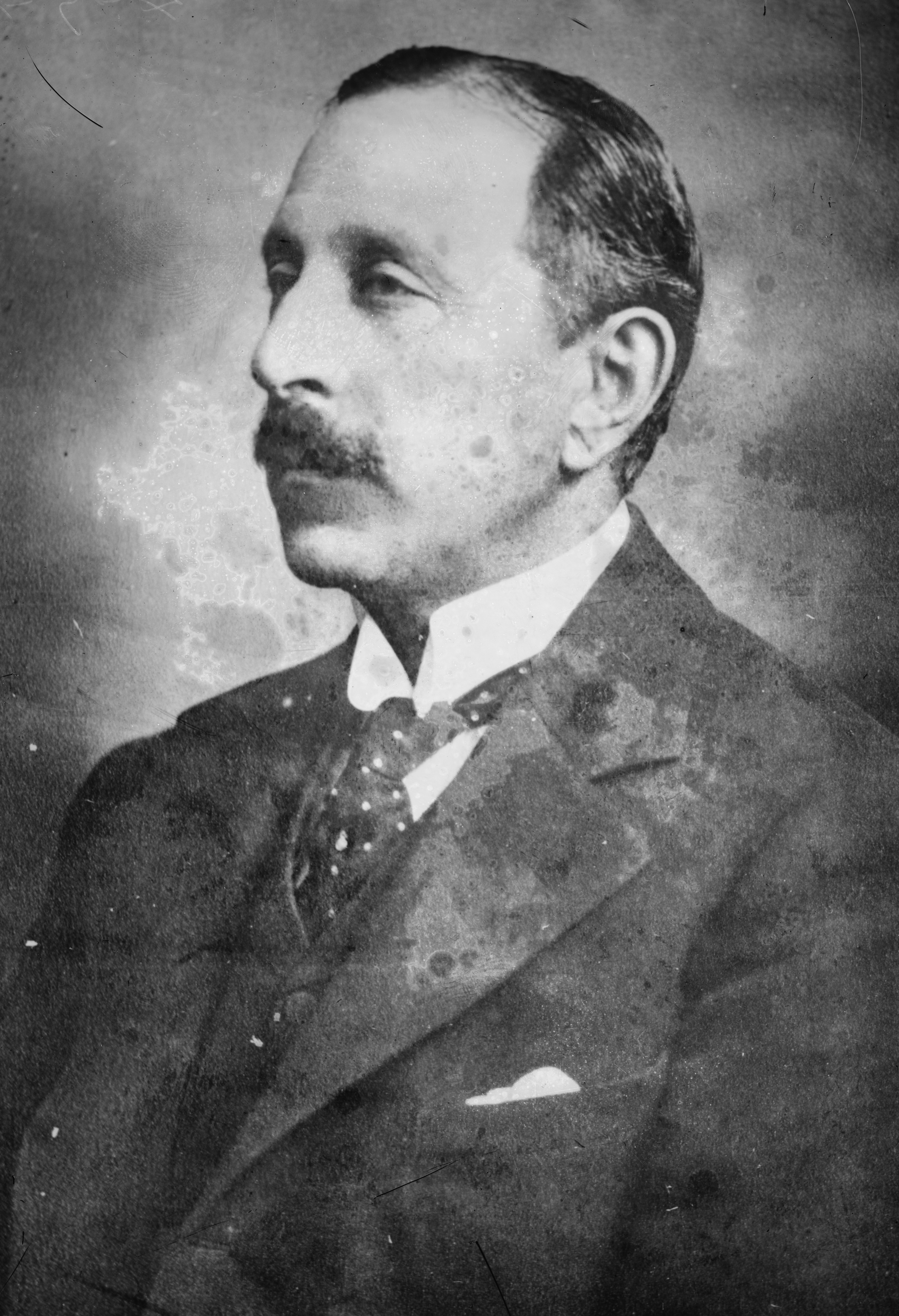
- Born: Ralph David Blumenfeld; 7 April 1864; Watertown, Wisconsin, United States
- Died: 17 July 1948 (aged 84); Great Easton, Essex, United Kingdom
- Other names: R.D.B. (pen name)
- Occupation: Journalist
- Title: Editor, Daily Express
- Spouse: Teresa Blumfeld (1892-1948)
- Children: John Elliot

Ralph David Blumenfeld (pen-name R.D.B., 7 April 1864 – 17 July 1948) was an American-born journalist, writer and newspaper editor who is chiefly notable for having been in charge of the British newspaper Daily Express from 1904 to 1932.

== Biography ==
Blumenfeld was born in Watertown, Wisconsin on 7 April 1864, the fourth son of David Blumenfeld, and his wife Nancy. A former professor from Nuremberg, David Blumenfeld had emigrated to the United States in 1848, where he founded Der Weltbürger, a German language newspaper. Aspiring to follow in his father's footsteps, Blumenfeld began his journalistic career working with his father before moving to the Chicago Herald in 1884. The next year saw him work for the United Press and in 1887 he visited the United Kingdom to report on the Golden Jubilee of Queen Victoria. After his return, his coverage of a fire for the New York Morning Journal led James Gordon Bennett, Jr. to offer him a Blumenfeld a job with his paper, the New York Herald, where Blumenfeld worked a reporter until differences led to his resignation in 1892.

Over the following six years, Blumenfeld built up a successful business selling linotype machines. In 1894 he moved to Britain, where his wealth and reputation as a journalist led to offers to purchase both The Observer and The Sunday Times, both of which he declined. Yet he desired to return to the world of journalism, and in 1900 eagerly accepted Alfred Harmsworth's offer of a position as news editor of the Daily Mail. He was soon involved in Harmsworth's business dealings as well, serving as Harmsworth's contact in his unsuccessful effort to purchase The Times from the Walter family.

Blumenfeld's tenure with Harmsworth was short. In 1902, Arthur Pearson convinced Blumenfeld to leave the Daily Mail for its rival, the recently established Daily Express. Accepting, Blumenfeld soon came to play an important role in the operation of the paper and he succeeded Bertram Fletcher Robinson as editor in the summer of 1904. During 1908, Blumenfeld was named a director of the company and took over as editor the following year. Grappling with business-related problems with the newspaper, he accepted a loan of £25,000 from Max Aitken, which was key to the press baron's subsequent assumption of ownership of the newspaper in 1917. Blumenfeld remained editor of the paper until 1929, but he gradually found himself marginalized as Beaverbrook (as Aitken was subsequently ennobled) assumed an intrusive role in editorial matters.

Politically Blumenfeld was a strong supporter of laissez-faire economics and a harsh critic of socialism and to this end he established the Anti-Socialist Union in 1908 and succeeded in linking the group closely to the Conservative Party.

After turning over editorship of the paper to his protégé Beverley Baxter, Blumenfeld wrote a number of books, including What is a Journalist (1930) and The Press in My Time (1932). In 1932 he became Chairman of the Board of Directors for the Daily Express, a position he held for the remainder of his life. He also served as president of the Institute of Journalists in 1928, master of the Company of News Makers from 1931 until 1933, and deputy master of the Worshipful Company of Stationers and Newspaper Makers from 1931 until 1935. Though active in the Conservative Party, he declined a knighthood offered for political services. A close friend of several politicians, he was said to have been one of the few people who induced Calvin Coolidge to talk, while leading a visit of journalists to the White House in 1927.

In 1935, after broadcasting a series of talks on BBC Radio called "Anywhere for a News Story", Blumenfeld retired to Muscombs, a farmhouse in Great Dunmow, Essex. Incapacitated by a stroke in 1936, he died twelve years later.

== Family ==
Blumenfeld's son John Elliot was born on 6 May 1898. He went on to become the assistant editor of the Evening Standard from 1922 to 1925. In his later career he was acting General Manager of the Southern Railway, the Chairman of the Railway Executive, and finally the Chairman of London Transport.

Media offices
Preceded by Fletcher Robinson	Editor of the Daily Express; 1909–1929	Succeeded by Beverley Baxter
