= H. B. Holding =

Henry Bond Holding (1859–1920) was a British politician, who was prominent in the Fabian Society.

Born in Manchester, Holding worked in the life assurance business for many years, becoming an inspector.

Holding came to prominence when living in Wood Green. He joined the Fabian Society in 1890, and served on its executive committee from 1894 until 1896. He won election to the Tottenham School Board, and then to the Municipal Borough of Wood Green, serving for a period as its chair.

Holding later moved to Letchworth, where he became chair of the parish council, and won a seat on Hertfordshire County Council. He was adopted as the Liberal Party Prospective Parliamentary Candidate for East Hertfordshire in the run-up to World War I, but by the time an election was held, in 1918, he instead stood in Wood Green as an independent liberal.
