= Wood Green (constituency) =

Parliamentary constituency in the United Kingdom, 1918–1983

- Former borough constituency for the House of Commons
- County: 1918–1965: Middlesex; 1965–1983: Greater London

1918–1983
- Seats: One
- Created from: Tottenham (parts of); Enfield (parts of)
- Replaced by: Hornsey and Wood Green (bulk); Tottenham (small parts)
- During its existence contributed to new seat(s) of: Southgate (1950)

Wood Green was a constituency for the House of Commons of the UK Parliament 1918—1983, centred on the Wood Green area of North London and its earlier broadest form included much of the seat of Enfield Southgate, created in 1950. It returned one Member of Parliament (MP).

== History ==
The Wood Green constituency was created for the 1918 general election and abolished for the 1983 general election.

It returned Conservative MPs until 1950, and then Labour or Labour Co-operative MPs until its abolition.

== Boundaries ==
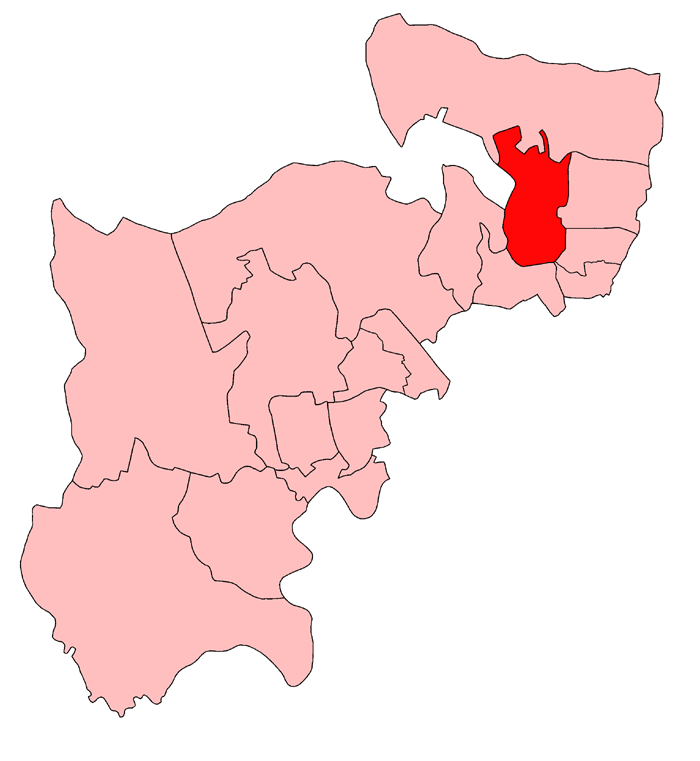
Wood Green in Middlesex, correct as to its boundaries 1918–50; many others shown here saw subdivision and change in 1945

Map that gives each named seat and any constant electoral success for national (Westminster) elections for Middlesex, 1955 to 1974.

Final form of the seat. (Results shown: 1979)

1918–1950: The Urban Districts of Wood Green and Southgate.

1950–1974: The Borough of Wood Green, and the Borough of Tottenham wards of Coleraine, Park, and White Hart Lane.

1974–1983: The Borough of Haringey wards of Alexandra-Bowes, Coleraine, Noel Park, Park, and Town Hall.

== Members of Parliament ==
Election	Member	Party	Notes
1918	Godfrey Locker-Lampson	Conservative	Member for Salisbury (1910–1918); Under-Secretary of State for Foreign Affairs (1925–1929)
1935	Beverley Baxter	Conservative	Contested Southgate following redistribution
Constituency split into two parts, forming the new seat of Southgate with the remainder joining with part of the abolished Tottenham North
1950	William Irving	Labour Co-op	Member for Tottenham North (1945–1950)
1955	Joyce Butler	Labour Co-op	
1979	Reg Race	Labour	
1983	constituency abolished: see Hornsey and Wood Green		

== Elections ==
=== Elections in the 1910s ===
General election 1918: Wood Green
Party		Candidate	Votes	%
C	Unionist	Godfrey Locker-Lampson	19,217	71.9
	Labour	Harri Tudor Rhys	4,539	17.0
	Liberal	Henry Bond Holding	2,957	11.1
Majority			14,678	54.9
Turnout			26,713	58.1
Registered electors				
	Unionist win (new seat)			
C indicates candidate endorsed by the coalition government.

=== Elections in the 1920s ===
General election 1922: Wood Green
Party	Candidate	Votes	%	±%
Unionist	Godfrey Locker-Lampson	21,937	70.0	−1.9
Labour	Harri Tudor Rhys	9,411	30.0	+13.0
Majority		12,526	40.0	−14.9
Turnout		31,348	66.5	+8.4
Unionist hold		Swing		

General election 1923: Wood Green
Party	Candidate	Votes	%	±%
Unionist	Godfrey Locker-Lampson	15,344	46.5	−23.5
Liberal	John Traill Stevenson	11,975	36.3	New
Labour	James Bacon	5,665	17.2	−12.8
Majority		3,369	10.2	−29.8
Turnout		32,984	69.1	+2.6
Unionist hold		Swing		

General election 1924: Wood Green
Party	Candidate	Votes	%	±%
Unionist	Godfrey Locker-Lampson	21,725	57.9	+11.4
Labour	Harri Tudor Rhys	8,648	23.0	+5.8
Liberal	John Traill Stevenson	7,158	19.1	−17.2
Majority		13,077	34.9	+24.7
Turnout		37,531	76.3	+7.2
Unionist hold		Swing		

General election 1929: Wood Green
Party	Candidate	Votes	%	±%
Unionist	Godfrey Locker-Lampson	24,821	47.6	−10.3
Liberal	Hew Fraser	14,995	28.7	+5.6
Labour	E P Bell	12,360	23.7	+0.7
Majority		9,826	18.9	−16.0
Turnout		52,176	73.0	−3.3
Unionist hold		Swing	-8.0	

=== Elections in the 1930s ===
General election 1931: Wood Green
Party	Candidate	Votes	%	±%
Conservative	Godfrey Locker-Lampson	44,364	78.7	+31.1
Labour	E. P. Bell	11,980	21.3	−2.4
Majority		32,384	57.4	+38.5
Turnout		56,344	72.3	−0.7
Conservative hold		Swing		

General election 1935: Wood Green
Party	Candidate	Votes	%	±%
Conservative	Beverley Baxter	36,384	62.0	−16.7
Labour	Dorothy Woodman	14,561	24.8	+3.5
Liberal	Hew Fraser	7,711	13.2	New
Majority		21,823	37.2	−20.2
Turnout		58,656	69.1	−3.2
Conservative hold		Swing		

General Election 1939–40: Another General Election was required to take place before the end of 1940. The political parties had been making preparations for an election to take place and by the Autumn of 1939, the following candidates had been selected;

- Conservative: Beverley Baxter
- Liberal: Hew Thomson Fraser
- Labour: Dorothy Woodman

=== Elections in the 1940s ===
General election 1945: Wood Green
Party	Candidate	Votes	%	±%
Conservative	Beverley Baxter	29,429	43.4	−18.6
Labour Co-op	Walter Armstrong Vant	23,544	34.7	+9.9
Liberal	Edwin Malindine	14,836	21.9	+8.7
Majority		5,885	8.7	−28.5
Turnout		67,809	74.9	+5.8
Conservative hold		Swing		

=== Elections in the 1950s ===
General election 1950: Wood Green
Party	Candidate	Votes	%
Labour Co-op	William Irving	28,480	52.38
Conservative	John Daw McEwen	20,013	36.81
Liberal	John Peter James Ellis	5,875	10.81
Majority		8,467	15.57
Turnout		54,368	81.88
Registered electors			
Labour Co-op win (new boundaries)			

General election 1951: Wood Green
Party	Candidate	Votes	%	±%
Labour Co-op	William Irving	30,360	55.79	+3.41
Conservative	Godman Irvine	24,060	44.21	+7.40
Majority		6,300	11.58	−3.99
Turnout		54,420	81.73	−0.15
Registered electors		66,586		
Labour Co-op hold		Swing	-2.00	

General election 1955: Wood Green
Party	Candidate	Votes	%	±%
Labour Co-op	Joyce Butler	25,523	53.92	−1.87
Conservative	George Cathles	21,811	46.08	+1.87
Majority		3,812	7.84	−3.74
Turnout		47,334	75.12	−6.61
Registered electors		63,015		
Labour Co-op hold		Swing	-1.87	

General election 1959: Wood Green
Party	Candidate	Votes	%	±%
Labour Co-op	Joyce Butler	22,869	51.27	−2.65
Conservative	Robert Shillingford	21,735	48.73	+2.65
Majority		1,134	2.54	−5.30
Turnout		44,604	75.12	0.00
Registered electors		59,380		
Labour Co-op hold		Swing	-2.65	

=== Elections in the 1960s ===
General election 1964: Wood Green
Party	Candidate	Votes	%	±%
Labour Co-op	Joyce Butler	22,131	56.64	+5.37
Conservative	George Cathles	16,939	43.36	−5.37
Majority		5,192	13.28	+10.74
Turnout		39,070	70.28	−4.84
Registered electors		55,593		
Labour Co-op hold		Swing	+5.37	

General election 1966: Wood Green
Party	Candidate	Votes	%	±%
Labour Co-op	Joyce Butler	21,922	60.80	+4.16
Conservative	Leonard Goldman	14,133	39.20	−4.16
Majority		7,789	21.60	+8.32
Turnout		36,055	67.32	−2.96
Registered electors		53,559		
Labour Co-op hold		Swing	+4.16	

=== Elections in the 1970s ===
General election 1970: Wood Green
Party	Candidate	Votes	%	±%
Labour Co-op	Joyce Butler	18,666	57.1	−3.7
Conservative	Michael Peter Russell Malynn	14,022	42.9	+3.7
Majority		4,644	14.2	−7.4
Turnout		32,689	60.9	−6.4
Labour Co-op hold		Swing		

General election February 1974: Wood Green
Party	Candidate	Votes	%	±%
Labour Co-op	Joyce Butler	18,594	50.61	
Conservative	Michael Peter Russell Malynn	10,950	29.81	
Liberal	Michael John Walton	7,194	19.58	New
Majority		7,644	20.80	
Turnout		36,735	71.10	
Labour Co-op hold		Swing		

General election October 1974: Wood Green
Party	Candidate	Votes	%	±%
Labour Co-op	Joyce Butler	16,605	51.28	
Conservative	Thomas Benyon	8,394	25.92	
Liberal	Michael John Walton	4,782	14.77	
National Front	Keith Squire	2,603	8.04	New
Majority		8,211	25.36	
Turnout		32,381	62.25	
Labour Co-op hold		Swing		

General election 1979: Wood Green
Party	Candidate	Votes	%	±%
Labour	Reg Race	16,465	46.94	
Conservative	Jenefer Riley	13,950	39.77	
Liberal	Geoffrey Davies	3,665	10.45	
National Front	Robert Frost	998	2.85	
Majority		2,515	7.17	
Turnout		35,079	67.41	
Labour hold		Swing		
