= Hues =

Hues may refer to:

- Jack Hues (born 1954), English musician best known for forming the 1980s band Wang Chung
- Matthias Hues (born 1959), German-born, American actor and martial artist
- Robert Hues (1553–1632), English mathematician and geographer
- Hues (album), a 1973 live album by American jazz saxophonist Sam Rivers

== See also ==
- Hue (disambiguation)
- Hue (name)
