= Treaty of Huế =

Treaty of Huế may refer to:

- Treaty of Huế (1863), which confirms the First Treaty of Saigon
- Treaty of Huế (1883), which cedes the regions of Annam and Tonkin to the French Empire
- Treaty of Huế (1884), which confirms the 1883 Treaty of Huế
