= Hugh (robot) =

2016 prototype robotic librarian

Hugh Robot
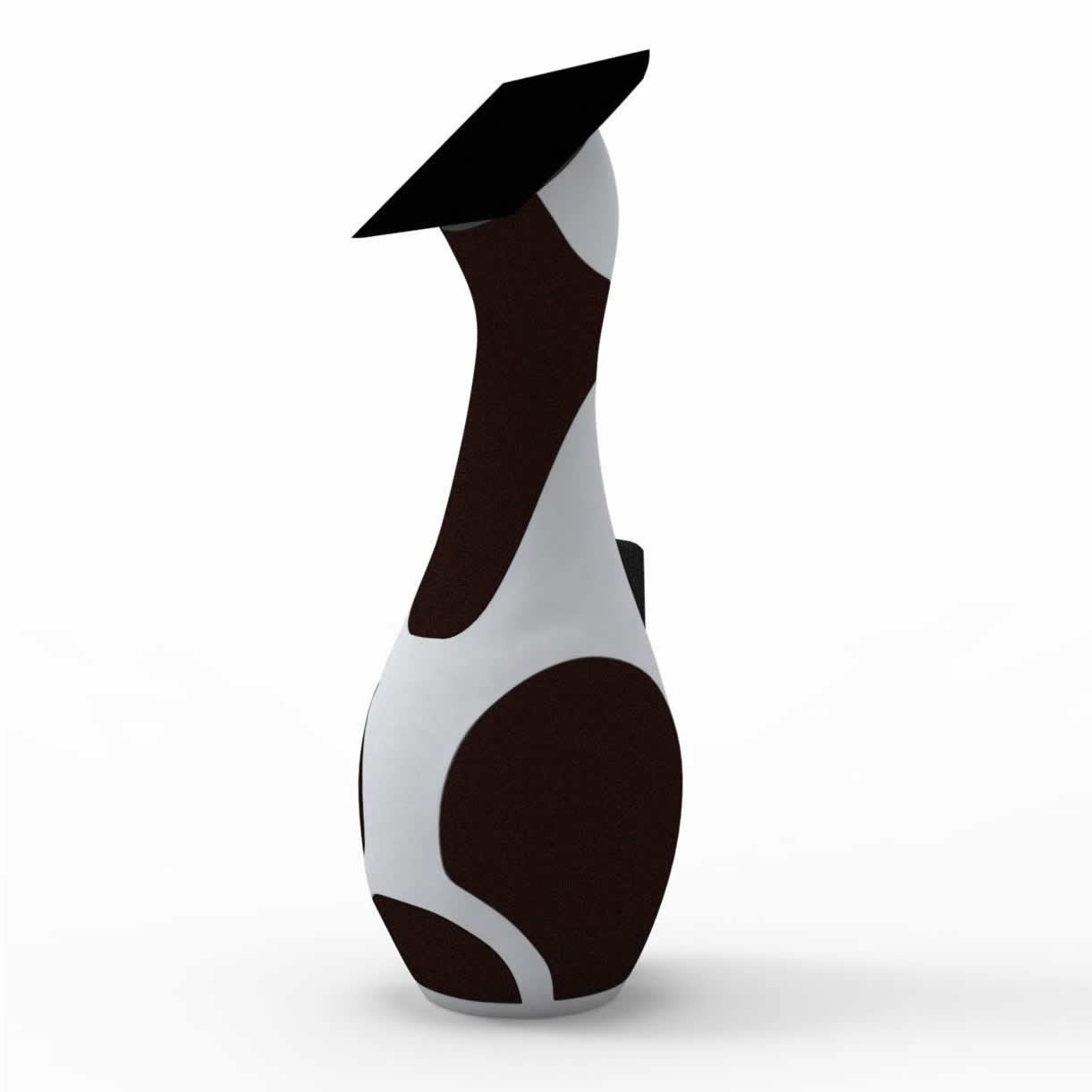
- 3D prototype rendering of intended final state for Hugh
- Manufacturer: Academy of Robotics
- Year of creation: 2016
- Type: service robot
- Purpose: robot librarian
- Website: www.iamhugh.co.uk

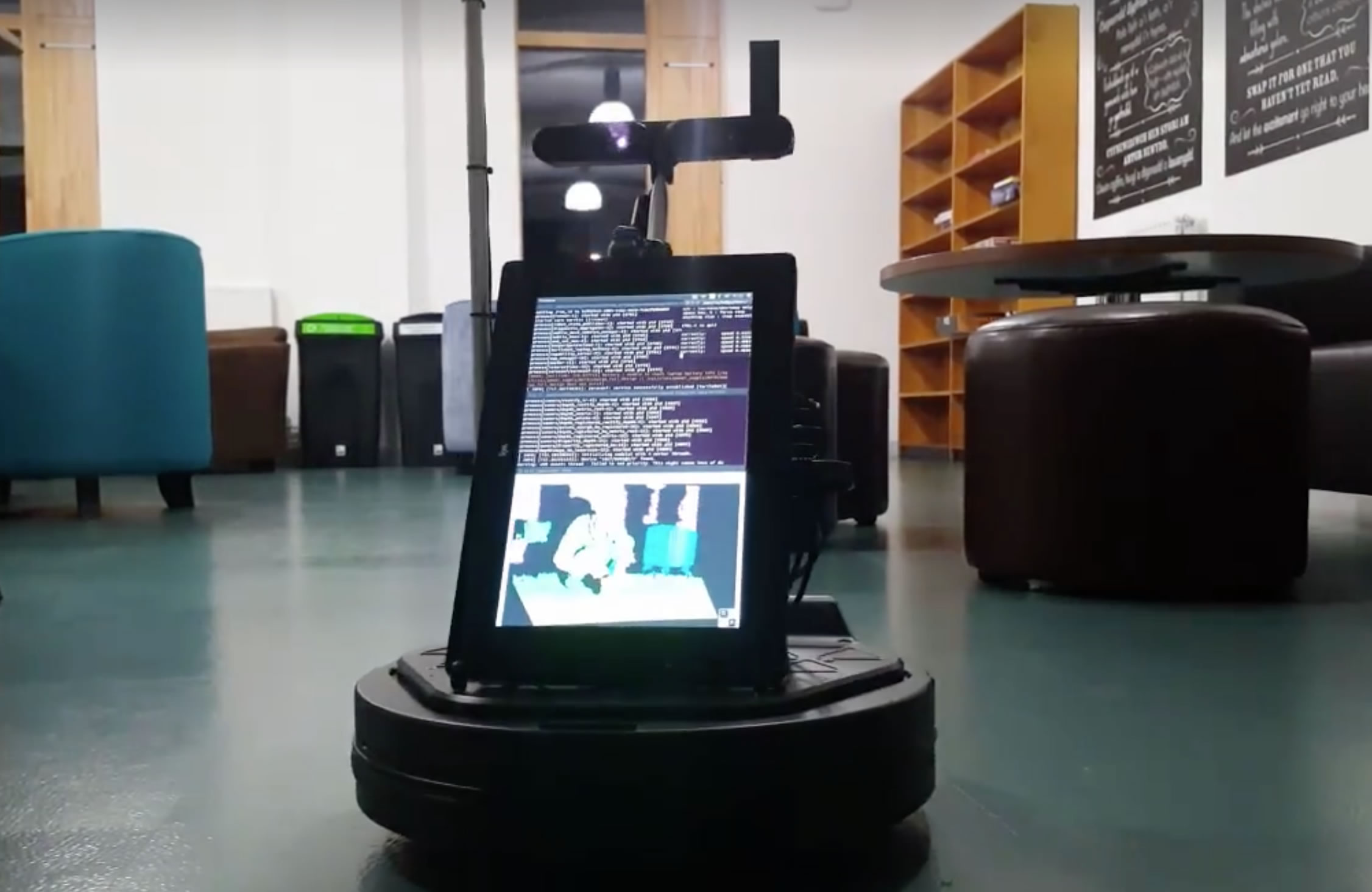
Hugh prototype

Hugh was a prototype of an artificial intelligence robot librarian designed by William Sachiti and Ariel Ladegaard at Aberystwyth University, which was first publicized in February 2016. Hugh's intended function was to help users locate books in a library and navigate them to it. Hugh did not leave the prototyping stage and never entered into use in Aberystwyth University library.
