= HHS Proficiency Examination =

American medical technologist certification

The HHS Proficiency Examination (formerly HEW Proficiency Examination) refers to an American medical technologist certification offered by the Department of Health Education and Welfare (HEW) and subsequently United States Department of Health and Human Services (HHS). The examination was established under Social Security Amendments of 1972 and was offered seven times from 1975 until 1987.

The HEW/HHS exam qualified individuals to serve as high complexity general supervisors under Clinical Laboratory Improvement Amendments(CLIA) 1992 without a degree.

The exam was administered a total of 7 times: 4 times between 1975 and 1977, once in 1979 and once in 1983, and one last time on August 28, 1987. Approximately 65,000 people took the exam, and approximately 31,000 passed. Several other allied health profession proficiency examinations were included in the original act, but only the laboratory examination was renewed.

The qualifications for the HEW exam were a GED and 4 year of on-the-job laboratory experience.

Over a dozen medical technologist professional associations opposed the certification including the American Society of Clinical Pathologists (ASCP) and American Medical Technologists (AMT). Opposition was in part due to the lack of educational requirements, another competing certification in a crowded field, and a lack of follow-up efficacy.

The Health Care Financing Administration (HCFA) was a proponent of the exam noting that it should "significantly increase the pool of personnel qualified for technologist positions in independent labs." Following the exam's discontinuation in 1987, in 1992 HCFA urged the reinstatement of the exam to address the shortage of properly credentialed laboratory personnel. American Association of Bioanalysts (AAB) and the International Society for Clinical Laboratory Technology (ISCLT) supported its reinstatement, while ASCP opposed it.

Those who passed the exam were given the designatory letters: CLT (HEW) and later CLT (HHS) for Clinical Laboratory Technologist.

HEW certified techs were paid less than the degree-bearing MT ASCP certified techs for the same work.

Results of the HEW/HHS exam can be obtained via the HHS System of Records Notices (SORNs) SORN 09–20–0157.

== Exam preparation ==
AAB developed a two-day review program to help individuals prepare for the HEW Proficiency Examination, known as the “Proficiency Examination Reviews” or “PERs”. The notes used during the reviews were compiled into a reference manual that became the PER Handbook which continued into its tenth edition in 2016.
