= Judson Huss =

American painter

- Born: Clifford Judson Huss; May 8, 1942; Durham, North Carolina, United States
- Died: July 25, 2008 (aged 66); Paris, France
- Known for: Painting, sculpting, design
- Movement: Fantastic art

Judson Huss (8 May 1942 – 25 July 2008), born Clifford Judson Huss, was an American-born painter and sculptor of fantastic art.

Born in Durham, North Carolina, he later moved with his family to Los Angeles, California where he began to study art. He was also a rock musician, playing guitar and bass with many bands, including Smith. He relocated to Paris in the mid 1970s, where he began to paint full-time. He was represented by the Morpheus Gallery, and through that gallery published River of Mirrors (1996), a retrospective book of his art.

== See also ==
- Fantastic art
