= Beverley Baxter =

British politician (1891-1964)

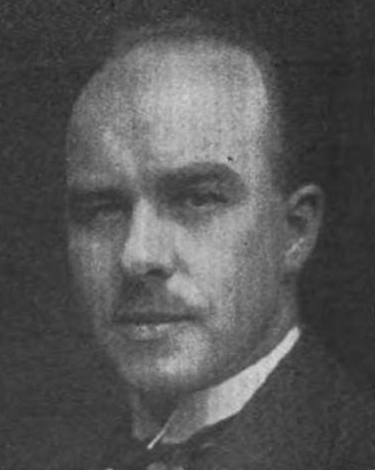

Member of Parliament for Southgate
- In office 23 February 1950 – 26 April 1964
- Preceded by: Constituency established
- Succeeded by: Anthony Berry

Member of Parliament for Wood Green
- In office 14 November 1935 – 23 February 1950
- Preceded by: Godfrey Locker-Lampson
- Succeeded by: William Irving

Personal details
- Born: Arthur Beverley Baxter; 8 January 1891 Toronto, Ontario, Canada
- Died: 26 April 1964 (aged 73) London, England
- Party: Conservative
- Spouse: Edith Letson (m. 1924)
- Occupation: Journalist, politician

Sir Arthur Beverley Baxter, FRSL (8 January 1891 – 26 April 1964) was a journalist and politician. Born in Toronto, Canada, he worked in the United Kingdom for the Daily Express and as a theatre critic for the London Evening Standard and was a Member of Parliament (MP) for the Conservative Party from 1935 to his death.

== Early life ==
He was born in Toronto from James Bennett Baxter, a Yorkshire-born Methodist who had emigrated to Canada, and his wife Meribah Elizabeth Lawson, born in Toronto. He left Harbord Collegiate Institute at 15. He worked for the Nordheimer Piano and Music Company selling pianos, and became a sales manager. The family was musical, his father being an organist and leading a choir, his mother a pianist and singer. He had friends in the Canadian music world including Ernest MacMillan and the baritone Edmund Arbuckle Burke.

In 1915 Baxter enlisted in the Canadian Expeditionary Force of World War I, becoming a signals lieutenant in the 122nd (Muskoka) Battalion, CEF in France. In 1917 he was posted for a time to England. In March 1918 he was again on the Western Front, but contracted influenza and was invalid out back to England again.

== Newspaper man ==
After the war, Baxter settled in London. In 1919 he met fellow Canadian Max Aitken, 1st Baron Beaverbrook, proprietor of the Daily Express. He went to work at the Express, with some reluctance since he had ambitions to be an author, as a leader writer and reporter. A friend from this period was Gilbert Frankau, who called him "Bax" as others did, and also had a private nickname "the inspired gate-crasher" for Baxter. His association with Beaverbrook was referred to as "Bax and Max".

Editor R. D. Blumenfeld put Baxter in charge of page 4 of the paper, with the editorial, opinion pieces, and letters to the editor. Beaverbrook sought to match the circulation of Lord Northcliffe's Daily Mail. George Garro-Jones wrote that as a journalist "Beverley Baxter in his day could be trusted to spare nobody."

In 1922 Baxter was appointed the managing editor of the Sunday Express, launched in 1918 by Beaverbrook after he had failed to acquire the Sunday Times, and loss-making for a decade; the editor there was James Douglas. Under the headline "Three Nights of Horror" Baxter reviewed for it in November 1922 a dramatisation of The Secret Agent, which he called "actionless and unmoving", and two other plays.

After two years, Baxter was moved to be the managing editor on the Daily Express in 1924, acting as deputy to Blumenfeld who became editor-in-chief. E. J. Robertson—Ewart John Robertson (1892–1960), another Canadian WWI veteran—employed by Beaverbrook as a manager ran daily operations.

Baxter had a musical connection to the Sitwell circle: William Walton dedicated a piano arrangement of a piece from Façade (1926) to his wife Edith. During the General Strike 1926, Osbert Sitwell and Siegfried Sassoon waited for and met Baxter outside his Chelsea flat, at 2 am, and discussed moderation of the "bellicose" tone on the strike taken by Express, with the hope of influencing Beaverbrook and seeing the strike resolved.

In 1929 Baxter went to work for the Daily Chronicle group (Inveresk Publications), as editor-in-chief. The Chronicle was edited by Robert Ensor. It was in play, having been sold at half price in 1928 by Yule Catto & Co., who had bought it in 1927 from David Lloyd George, to the entrepreneur William Harrison who chaired the Inveresk Paper Co. In 1930 the Daily Chronicle was amalgamated with the Daily News to form the News Chronicle.

Blumenfeld, "elbowed aside and kicked upstairs" by Beaverbrook, retired later in 1929. Baxter took over as editor-in-chief of the Daily Express. He increased the circulation, which for the first time it exceeded 1,000,000 under his stewardship; in 1933 it topped 2,000,000.

== Kemsley Newspapers and appeasement ==
Baxter left the Beaverbrook stable in 1933, replaced as editor of the Daily Express by Arthur Christiansen. He worked as Public Relations counsel for the Gaumont British Picture Corporation Ltd.

In 1935 Baxter was recruited by Allied Newspapers to be an Editorial Adviser by Lord Camrose; in 1937 he moved across to Kemsley Newspapers, controlled by Lord Kemsley, Camrose's brother. In 1936 he began the "London Letter" series for Maclean's Magazine, reporting on British politics and life to Canadians: it ran to 1960. He wrote the "Atticus" gossip column in the Sunday Times and was commended for his journalism by Prime Minister Neville Chamberlain, as "a most loyal supporter of the Government".

During the debates about foreign policy in the late 1930s, Baxter was an advocate of appeasement of Germany. In July 1938 he called for the United Kingdom to go to Germany helpfully, and not to block Germany wherever she tried to expand. He drew a parallel between Germans and Britons, saying that the two had the same human ambitions and sense of destiny.

An article Baxter wrote about two weeks after the Munich Agreement in the Star of 1938 was in a German report from London of 15 October taken to have shown up "in a masterly way the spitefulness of the speeches made by Opposition Conservatives and describes the Führer's answer to them as a well-deserved retort." He appealed to British women in terms of "responsibility to the nation" to support the campaign for "Peace and Preparedness".

== Theatre critic ==
In 1942 Baxter was appointed by Lord Beaverbrook as theatre critic for the Evening Standard, a post which he held for the eight years, combining it with his duties as a Member of Parliament. Milton Shulman, the paper's film critic, would fill in whenever Baxter had miss a first night: he eventually found that Baxter's ability to attend was "becoming somewhat erratic."

A first night disaster that became a stock theatrical anecdote played a role in Baxter's losing the job in 1951. In Shulman's account, Gavin Lambert wrote an anonymous "sardonic knifing of all of Fleet Street's working theatre critics but was particularly derisive about the 'merciless volubility' of Beverley Baxter", published in an undergraduate magazine Panorama edited by Kenneth Tynan. Shulman showed the article to Charles Curran, the features editor, who passed it to Baxter.

Tynan was drama critic for The Spectator, and was "brutally unfair" about the acting of Vivien Leigh; Leigh's daughter Suzette and Baxter's daughter Meribah were debutantes who shared a party, as Baxter wrote in one of his "London Letter" columns, on 15 May 1951. Baxter reviewed Tynan's performance as the Player King in Alec Guinness's production of Hamlet at the New Theatre that opened on 17 May in London, writing: "I am a man of a kindly nature, who takes no joy in hurting those who are without defence, but Mr Ken Tynan [...] would not get a chance in a village hall unless he was related to the vicar. His performance was quite dreadful."

Tynan responded with an open letter to the Standard, published 22 May 1951, declaring that his performance was "not 'quite dreadful'; it is, in fact, only slightly less than mediocre": in July Beaverbrook appointed him as replacement for Baxter as the paper's theatre critic. Baxter was then music critic on the Standard. He slammed the 1953 performance of Benjamin Britten's Gloriana, suggesting that Edward German's light opera Merrie England would have been more suitable for Elizabeth II's coronation.

== In politics ==
Baxter was selected as Conservative Party candidate for Wood Green in London in 1935. The 1935 general election was called while he was touring in Canada, but he won the seat with a majority of over 21,000. While a Member of Parliament Baxter wrote occasional newspaper articles, particularly for the Daily Sketch, and he became known as a government supporter.

Reviewing Norman Thompson's 2013 book Canada and the End of the Imperial Dream based on Baxter's "London Letters", Daniel Gorman commented in Histoire Sociale/Social History that

In his politics, Baxter was a journalistic weathervane. Always a conservative, he variously supported and opposed the successive grandees of the British Conservative party [...]

He noted also that, until the Suez Crisis of 1956, Baxter consistently championed the British Empire and Canada's part in it, his views being in line with Beaverbrook's. His maiden speech in December 1935 argued that the problems of depressed areas in Britain could be alleviated by encouraging emigration to the other countries of the British Empire.

== World War II ==
On 10 March 1940, Baxter published a piece in the Sunday Graphic, criticising Joseph P. Kennedy Sr. who was US ambassador to the United Kingdom, for a lack of advocacy encouraging Americans to enter the war. It was read into the record of the House of Representatives by Fred L. Crawford, on 2 April.

In the spring of 1940, Baxter was an advocate for the internment of aliens, writing in the Sunday Chronicle "I'd Intern My German Friends". Later that year, when internments under Defence Regulation 18B had become numerous, he wrote in the Daily Sketch that Friedelind Wagner had been poorly treated. She had been writing anti-German articles for the Sketch, in which he had been involved.

Baxter supported Neville Chamberlain in the Norway debate of May 1940, and the next morning protested vigorously about the attacks on Chamberlain's character, urging him not to regard the vote as one of censure but to show the courage of David Lloyd George. Chamberlain, however, resigned that day.

The incoming Churchill government put Beaverbrook in charge of the Ministry of Aircraft Production, on 14 May. Baxter's reaction was recorded in the diary of Henry Channon, for 12 June 1940: "Beaverbrook himself is so pleased to be in the government that he is like the town tart who has finally married the Mayor!" Baxter had an unofficial post with the Ministry, where he was responsible for maintaining production of aero-engines. He became a Churchill loyalist; when Sir John Wardlaw-Milne put down a motion of no confidence after the loss of Libya in June 1942, Baxter put down an amendment assuring Churchill of "unqualified support in the introduction of any measures .. for the intensified prosecution of the war".

Writing under the pseudonym of Cassius, Michael Foot published an anti-Tory work Brendan and Beverley in 1944, singling out Baxter and Brendan Bracken. It meant he had to give up his position as editor of the Evening Standard, owned by Lord Beaverbrook.

== Post-war ==
Baxter during the 1945 general election stated that "the Labour Party had agreed to co-operate in the war at the price of the abdication of the Conservative Party." He retained his seat with a majority reduced to under 6,000.

In December 1945 Baxter was part of the large Conservative dissent from the proposed Anglo-American loan agreement. He opposed European integration, and in 1948 was one of eight Conservatives to vote against Marshall Aid (with Max Aitken, Eric Gandar Dower, Harry Legge-Bourke, Anthony Marlowe, Arthur Marsden and Sir John Mellor).

Baxter was involved in the 1947 Budget leak that put an end to Hugh Dalton's time as Chancellor of the Exchequer. He was made aware of the short budget summary that Dalton had given to the journalist John Carvel, by another journalist, Willie Allison of the Evening Standard. Unwilling to exploit the political advantage himself, he asked Victor Raikes, a Tory MP hostile to the Labour government, to raise the matter in the House of Commons. Raikes put down a Private Notice Question, referring to the accurate prediction in Carvel's paper the Star of budget measures. Dalton gave frank answers in the House, but Clement Attlee required him to resign his post.

A supporter of the abolition of capital punishment, Baxter reverted in 1948 to an old campaign. In early January 1923, he had made a last-minute effort to save the life of Edith Thompson, who had been sentenced to death for murder, in what he believed was a miscarriage of justice. In his memoirs Strange Street, he provided an account of the events, concluding that "on an appointed day we shall rub our eyes and believe that it could only have been in a nightmare that judicial killing was ever countenanced by a supposedly civilised people". Sir John Anderson was in touch with Baxter in 1948, stating that one of the hangmen of Thompson objected to Baxter's account. Arthur Koestler cited in his campaign for abolition Baxter's statements, brought up by Lord Templewood as requiring a reply, while regarded by Lord Mancroft as rumours. In 1952 Lewis Broad published a book The Innocence of Mrs Thompson on the case.

== Last years ==
At the 1950 general election, Baxter moved constituencies to stand for the newly created Southgate constituency. He was always returned with more than 60% of the votes cast. After Churchill returned to power in 1951, Baxter condemned the Foreign Office under the previous Labour government for having been "like a branch of the State Department".

Baxter was given a knighthood in the Queen's Birthday Honours list of 1954. He continued to support the abolition of capital punishment and acted as a sponsor of Bills to that effect brought in by the Labour MP Sydney Silverman, and spent a great deal of the late 1950s campaigning for a reduction in theatre tax. In 1959 he signed a motion deploring the call by some Labour MPs for televising the proceedings of the House of Commons.

In 1961 Baxter broke the whip to support a Conservative backbench amendment to restore corporal punishment for young offenders. He was very concerned at the Macmillan government's application to join the European Communities lest it damage ties with the Commonwealth, and abstained rather than support the government when it was put to the vote in August 1961.

In poor health, Baxter announced that that Parliament was to be his last. He was criticised in January 1963 by the television programme That Was The Week That Was for having made no speeches since the 1959 general election. Baxter died in London before Parliament was dissolved, but no byelection to replace him was held due to the imminence of the general election.

== Works ==
In a profile in The Bookman in 1921, Baxter was quoted as saying that as a "fictionist", his ambition was "to write in such a way as to illuminate ordinary, commonplace life".

- The Blower of Bubbles (1920), stories
- The Parts Men Play (1920), novel
- Strange Street (1935), autobiography dealing with Fleet Street rivalries
- Westminster Watchtower (1938)
- Destiny Called Them (1939), picture book of the British royal family
- Men, Martyrs and Mountebanks (1940)
- It Happened in September, play performed 1943
- First Nights and Noises Off (undated c.1949), collected theatre reviews, portraits by Grant Macdonald.
- First Nights and Footlights (1955), collected theatre reviews, illustrated with 18 production photographs.

== Family ==
In 1924 Baxter married Edith Christina Letson from Vancouver, sister of Harry Letson. They had a son and a daughter. Clive Baxter, the son, was a journalist with the Financial Post, married to Cynthia Molson, sister of Eric Molson. Meribah Mary Baxter married in 1959 Lieut. Brian Stark RN.

Media offices
Preceded by R. D. Blumenfeld	Editor of the Daily Express; 1929–1933	Succeeded by Arthur Christiansen
Parliament of the United Kingdom
Preceded by Godfrey Locker-Lampson	Member of Parliament for Wood Green; 1935–1950	Succeeded by William Irving
New constituency	Member of Parliament for Southgate; 1950–1964	Succeeded by Anthony Berry
