= Godfrey Locker-Lampson =

British politician, poet and essayist

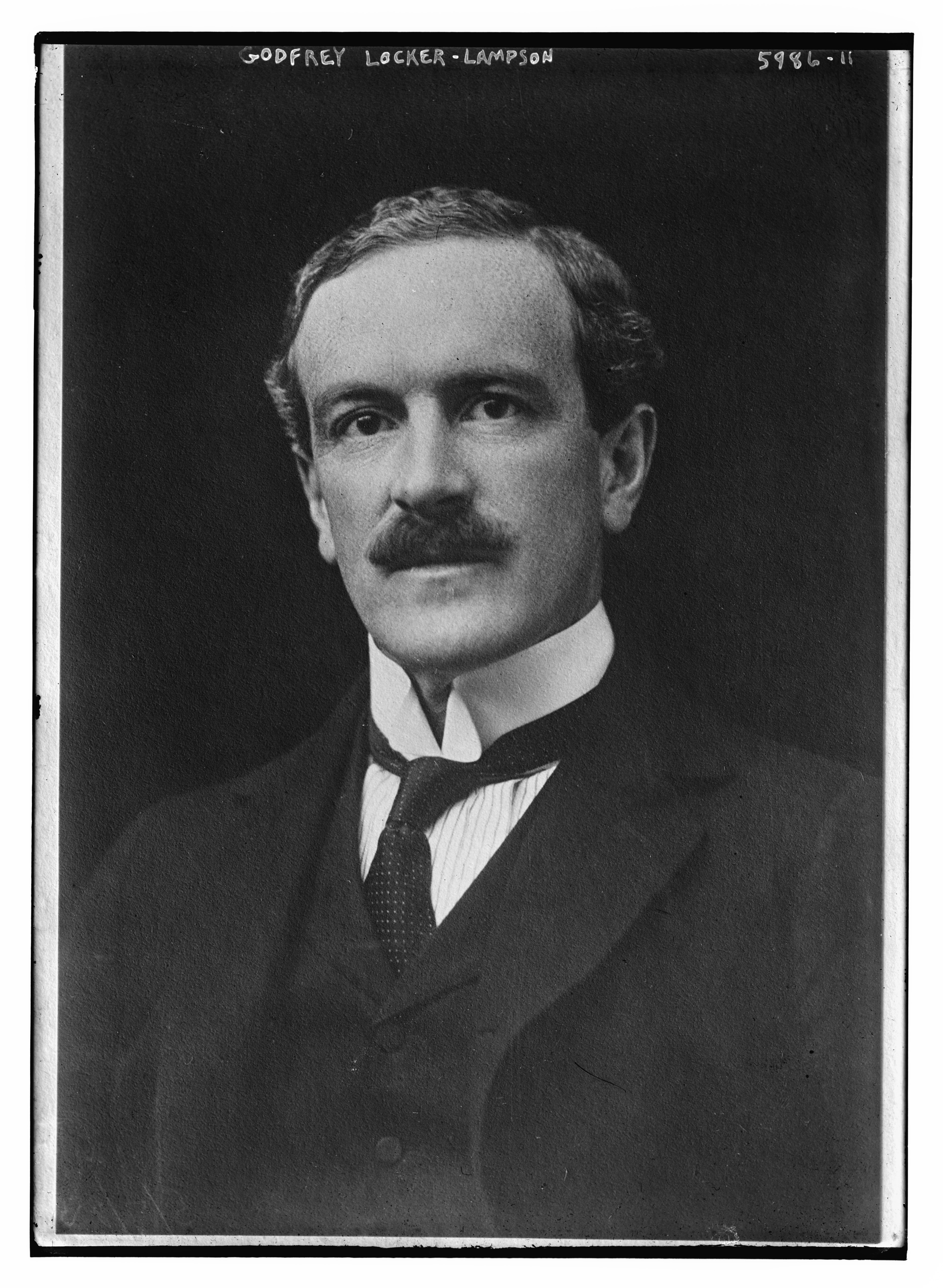
- Godfrey Locker-Lampson

Member of Parliament for Wood Green
- In office 1918-1935

Member of Parliament for Salisbury
- In office 1910-1918

Personal details
- Born: 19 June 1875
- Died: 1 May 1946 (aged 70)
- Party: Conservative
- Spouse(s): Sophy de Rodes (m. 1905; died 1935) Barbara Green (m. 1937)
- Children: 3
- Parent: Frederick Locker (father)
- Relatives: Oliver Locker-Lampson (brother); Curtis Lampson (maternal grandfather); Edward Hawke Locker (paternal grandfather)
- Education: Trinity College, Cambridge
- Military career
- Allegiance: United Kingdom
- Branch: British Army
- Units: Middlesex Yeomanry; Royal Wiltshire Yeomanry
- Conflicts: World War I

Godfrey Lampson Tennyson Locker-Lampson (19 June 1875 – 1 May 1946) was a British Conservative politician, poet and essayist.

== Birth and education ==
The elder son of the poet Frederick Locker and his second wife Hannah Jane Lampson, daughter of Sir Curtis Lampson, he was educated at Cheam School, Eton and Trinity College, Cambridge. His younger brother Oliver Locker-Lampson was also a Conservative MP.

== Diplomatic and military service ==
Locker-Lampson entered the Foreign Office in 1898, was appointed Third Secretary in December 1900, and was posted at The Hague and St Petersburg until he left the Diplomatic service in 1903. He then studied law at Lincoln's Inn and was called to the Bar in 1908, though never practised. He was commissioned a second lieutenant in the Middlesex Yeomanry on 14 March 1900. He served with the Royal Wiltshire Yeomanry from 1914 to 1916 and was briefly ADC to Lt.-General Henry Hughes Wilson of IV Corps on the Western Front, during which time he was said to have used his diplomatic skills to effect a rapprochement between Wilson and Lloyd George.

== Parliamentary career ==
He unsuccessfully contested Chesterfield at the 1906 general election, and served as Conservative Member of Parliament for Salisbury from 1910 to 1918, then Wood Green from 1918 to 1935.

He was Parliamentary Private Secretary to the Home Secretary, Sir George Cave, in 1916–17, and to the Assistant Foreign Secretary, Lord Robert Gascoyne-Cecil in 1918. He was a Charity Commissioner in 1922-23 and served in government as Under-Secretary of State for Home Affairs from March 1923 to January 1924, and again from November 1924 to December 1925, when he represented the Office of Works in the House of Commons. During this latter period his PPS was Anthony Eden at the Home Office and then briefly at the Foreign Office. He was Under-Secretary of State for Foreign Affairs from December 1925 to June 1929. He was a member of the British Delegation to the League of Nations at Geneva in 1928 and was appointed a Privy Counsellor in the 1928 Birthday Honours.

== Literary achievements ==
He was a published poet, essayist and historian. His works include A Consideration of the State of Ireland in the Nineteenth Century (1907), On Freedom (1911), Oratory, British and Irish. The Great Age from the accession of George the Third to the Reform Bill, 1832 (1918), The Country Gentleman, and Other Essays (1932), and Sun and Shadow: Collected Love Lyrics and other poems (1945). He was also a noted collector of ancient Greek coins and published an important catalogue of his collection in 1923.

== Personal life ==
He was married twice: to Sophy Felicité de Rodes (1905), who died in 1935, and to Barbara Hermione Green (1937). He had three daughters by his first wife, Felicity, Stella and Elizabeth.

Parliament of the United Kingdom
Preceded by Edward Tennant	Member of Parliament for Salisbury; Jan 1910–1918	Succeeded by Hugh Morrison
New constituency	Member of Parliament for Wood Green; 1918–1935	Succeeded by Beverley Baxter
Political offices
Preceded by Hon. George Frederick Stanley	Under-Secretary of State for the Home Department; 1923–1924	Succeeded by Rhys Davies
Preceded by Rhys Davies	Under-Secretary of State for the Home Department; 1924–1925	Succeeded by Douglas Hacking
Preceded by Ronald McNeill	Under-Secretary of State for Foreign Affairs; 1925–1929	Succeeded by Hugh Dalton
