= Hewes Point =

Coordinates: 44°18′15″N 68°53′14″W

Hewes Point is a peninsula in Islesboro, Maine. It is located on Penobscot Bay.

It was named for Paola Hewes, a pioneer settler.
