= Reg Race =

British politician (born 1947)

Member of Parliament
- In office 1979–1983
- Preceded by: Joyce Butler
- Succeeded by: seat abolished
- Constituency: Wood Green

Personal details
- Born: Denys Alan Reginald Race; June 23, 1947 (age 78)
- Party: Labour
- Occupation: Healthcare management consultant

Denys Alan Reginald Race (born 23 June 1947) is a British Labour Party politician.

== Parliamentary career ==
He unsuccessfully contested the Conservative-held constituency of Ruislip-Northwood at the February 1974 general election and again at the October 1974 general election.

At the 1979 general election, Race was elected as Member of Parliament for the Wood Green constituency in the London Borough of Haringey. The constituency was abolished for the 1983 general election.

In 1982, Race became the first MP ever to utter the word "fuck" on the floor of the House when referring to advertisements for prostitutes reading "Phone them and fuck them". Hansard recorded it as "f*** them", but the Speaker deprecated even that version.

In the run-up to the 1987 UK general election he was shortlisted for the Labour nomination in the safe seat of Coventry North-East, but he came fifth at the selection meeting.

In 1990, Race created a group called 'Labour Party Socialists' with Jeremy Corbyn and Tony Benn.

== After Parliament ==
For the 2001 general election, Race was selected as the Labour Party candidate for Chesterfield, following the retirement there of long-serving MP Tony Benn. Race finished in second place to the Liberal Democrat candidate Paul Holmes.

Since 2001, Race has been owner and managing director of a healthcare management consultancy based in Chesterfield. He backed Alan Johnson in the 2007 Labour deputy leadership election.

Race has donated nearly £50,000 to the Labour Party. He was involved in the creation of the 'Saving Labour' campaign website, intended to encourage members of the public to email Labour MPs to urge them not to back Jeremy Corbyn in the 2016 Labour leadership election, and to encourage them to register as £25 Labour supporters, enabling them to vote for a different party leader.

Parliament of the United Kingdom
Preceded by Joyce Butler	Member of Parliament for Wood Green; 1979–1983	Constituency abolished
