= Hue (software) =

Open-source SQL Cloud Editor

Cloudera Hue

- Interface and the SQL Editor
- Stable release: 4.11.0 / January 23, 2023; 2 years ago
- Repository: github.com/cloudera/hue
- Written in: Python, JavaScript
- Type: Web platform
- License: Apache License 2.0
- Website: gethue.com

Hue (Hadoop User Experience) is an open-source SQL Cloud Editor, licensed under the Apache License 2.0.

== Overview ==
Hue is an open-source SQL Assistant for querying Databases & Data Warehouses and collaborating. Its goal is to make self service data querying more widespread in organizations.

The Hue team provides releases on its website. Hue is also present in the Cloudera Data Platform and the Hadoop services of the cloud providers Amazon AWS, Google Cloud Platform, and Microsoft Azure.
