= Francis Hews =

- Born: 3 March 1768; Aldbury, England
- Died: 15 May 1810 (aged 42); Northampton, England
- Occupation: Baptist preacher
- Known for: Spoils Won in the Day of Battle, 1798

Francis Hews (3 March 1768 – 15 May 1810) was a Baptist preacher. He was known for his work in Bedfordshire, England, and for the account he gave in his autobiography, Spoils Won in the Day of Battle (1798), of the opposition he received to his activities which, he claimed, included threats of murder.

== Early life ==
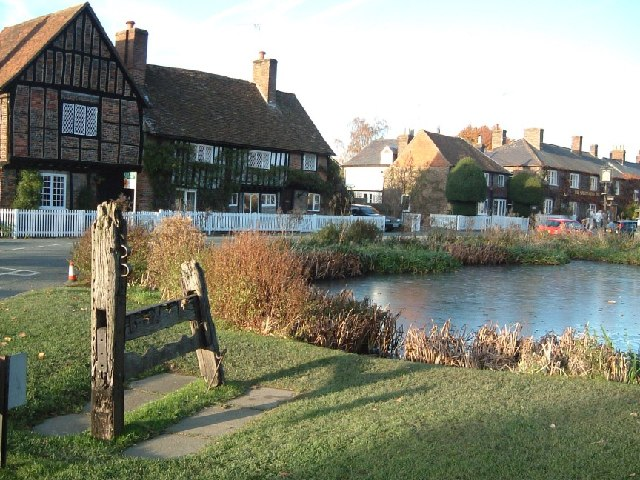
Aldbury, Hertfordshire

Francis Hews was born at Aldbury, Hertfordshire, on 3 March 1768. Hews records in his autobiography that his parents were "carnal" and he did not attend church on a Sunday in his early years. He first began to consider religious matters at the age of 8. At the age of 18, in 1786, he began a travelling ministry in the counties of Bedfordshire, Buckinghamshire, and Hertfordshire.

== Career ==
By the 1790s, Hews was pastor over the Baptist churches in Dunstable and Westoning, both in Bedfordshire. He registered Baptist meeting places, as required by law, in 1793 and 1799.

Hews received significant opposition to his work, including threats of violence which are recorded in his autobiography Spoils Won in the Day of Battle (1798) and, it is claimed, even of murder. The Quarter Session Rolls for Bedfordshire, held by Bedfordshire Archives, show that in 1793, Articles of Peace were ordered between "Francis Hews, Dunstable, against Thos. Brincklo, Totternhoe, lab. for threatening that he "would shoot him..........do for him....take care of him before he had done with him....".

Spoils was reviewed unfavourably by The New London Review in 1800, which complained about the "libellous language" with which Hews wrote about his "many enemies". The reviewer commented that he was unsure where Hews should be sent to "Bridewell for correction, or to Bedlam for a cure". In The Bedfordshire Magazine, L.R. Conisbee described the book as "a kind of spiritual autobiography" and commented on a poem that Hews had written in 1799 that he criticised as a "revealing diatribe" where "cheap scriptural invective takes the place of irony".

In 1803, Hews was instrumental in the founding of the Providence Chapel in Luton, where he also preached. He served as the pastor of the Baptist church at Dunstable for around 15 years. At Michaelmas 1809 he moved to Northampton to take over the Baptist church there.

== Death ==
The Evangelical Magazine recorded that Hews died from a stroke at Northampton on 15 May 1810. He was buried in the family vault at Dunstable. The funeral sermon was given by Carter of St Albans from John xxi 17, the same text from which Hews preached his last sermon at Northampton on 6 May 1810.

== Selected publications ==
- Spoils Won in the Day of Battle, and Dedicated to the Use of the Church: or God's Dealings with the Author, Francis Hews. Gurney, Bedford, 1798. (Reprinted in part in Zion's Casket, 1852, and in Zion's Witness CX-CXI in 1967–69, and as Spoils &c in 1972)
- The Songs of Sion in Gospel Sound. Berkhamstead, 1800.
- The Old and New Covenants; or The Eternal Law and Everlasting Gospel. J. Hodson (printed), London, 1801.
