= Floud =

Floud is a surname, and may refer to:

- Francis Floud (1875–1965), High Commissioner to Canada
- Peter Floud (1911–1960), civil servant, husband of Jean Floud
- Jean Floud (née MacDonald) (1915–2013), sociologist and principal of Newnham College
- Bernard Floud (1915–1967), television executive and MP
- Roderick Floud (born 1942), economic historian
