= Aslin =

Aslin is an English surname, from the Norman name Asceline. Åslin is an unrelated Swedish locational surname, from ås "ridge". Notable people with the surnames include:

- Aiden Aslin (born 1994), British foreign volunteer
- Charles Herbert Aslin (1893–1959), British architect
- David Åslin (born 1989), Swedish ice hockey player
- Elizabeth Mary Aslin (1923–1989), English art historian, administrator, author and lecturer
- Peter Åslin (1962–2012), Swedish ice hockey goaltender
- Richard N. Aslin (born 1949), American psychologist
