= Pilgrim Society =

Pilgrim Society may refer to:

- Pilgrim Society, Massachusetts non-profit corporation which operates Pilgrim Hall Museum
- Pilgrims Society, an American-British honorary society
