= Acton (constituency) =

Parliamentary constituency in the United Kingdom, 1918–1983

- Former borough constituency for the House of Commons
- Boundary of Acton in Greater London for the February 1974 general election
- County: 1918–1965: Middlesex; 1965–1983: Greater London
- Borough: Acton; London Borough of Ealing

1918–1983
- Seats: One
- Created from: Ealing
- Replaced by: Ealing Acton

Map that gives each named seat and any constant electoral success for national (Westminster) elections for Middlesex, 1955 to 1974.

Acton was a constituency of the House of Commons of the Parliament of the United Kingdom, created for the 1918 general election. It elected one Member of Parliament (MP) by the first-past-the-post system of election.

== Boundaries and boundary changes ==
Map of boundaries 1974–1983

Dates	Local authority	Maps	Wards
1918–1945	Municipal Borough of Acton		Acton Urban District
1945–1974	Municipal Borough of Acton (before 1965); London Borough of Ealing (after 1965)		Acton Urban District
1974–1983	London Borough of Ealing		Central, East, Hanger Hill, Heathfield, Southfield and Springfield.

=== 1918–1945 ===
The constituency was formed entirely from the existing constituency of Ealing

=== 1945–1974 ===
The constituency was subject to minor boundary changes.

=== 1974–1983 ===
Wards to the west were transferred from the abolished constituency of Ealing South as well as minor parts of Ealing North.

=== History ===
The seat was created by the Representation of the People Act 1918 which increased the number of seats where population had expanded such as in Middlesex due to the conurbation growing around the County of London. It was based on the town of Acton. The seat consisted of the Acton Urban District which became a Municipal Borough in 1921.

A redistribution of Parliamentary seats, which took effect at the 1950 United Kingdom general election made no change to the boundaries; its legislation, affecting election expenses and returning officer re-classified, the seat as a borough constituency.

In 1965 the area became part of the London Borough of Ealing and Greater London.

In the redistribution which took effect at the February 1974 general election, the seat to the west, Ealing South, was abolished and this seat absorbed most of its area to reach the electoral quota, it having been heavily underweight in electorate. The seat in statute and statutory instrument became variously Ealing: Acton and/or simply Acton where under a heading of London Borough of Ealing. From the review effective from the election of 1983 it became Ealing Acton.

Components

- 1918–74: Acton M.B. Note per the London Government Act 1963 the Metropolitan Borough ceased to exist in 1965, its functions being replaced by the larger London Borough of Ealing.
- 1974–83: Six wards (the old area plus the centre of the new larger borough, further west), namely:
  - The London Borough of Ealing wards: Central, East, Hanger Hill, Heathfield, Southfield and Springfield.

The change was extension, along all of the former western edge.

== Members of Parliament ==
Election	Member	Party	Notes
1918	Sir Harry Brittain	Unionist	
1929	James Shillaker	Labour	
1931	Hubert Duggan	Conservative	Died October 1943
1943 by-election	Henry Longhurst	Conservative	
1945	Joseph Sparks	Labour	
1959	Philip Holland	Conservative	
1964	Bernard Floud	Labour	Died October 1967
1968 by-election	Kenneth Baker	Conservative	
1970	Nigel Spearing	Labour	
1974	Sir George Young	Conservative	Contested Ealing Acton following redistribution
1983	constituency abolished: see Ealing Acton		

== Elections ==
=== Elections in the 1910s ===
1918 general election: Acton
Party		Candidate	Votes	%
C	Unionist	Harry Brittain	11,671	73.3
	Labour	Robert Dunsmore	4,241	26.7
Majority			7,430	46.7
Turnout			15,912	53.9
Registered electors			29,539	
	Unionist win (new seat)			
C indicates candidate endorsed by the coalition government.

=== Elections in the 1920s ===
1922 general election: Acton
Party	Candidate	Votes	%	±%
Unionist	Harry Brittain	10,208	50.0	–23.4
Labour	Mary Richardson	5,342	26.2	–0.5
Liberal	Neville Dixey	4,877	23.9	New
Majority		4,866	23.8	–22.9
Turnout		20,427	67.1	+13.3
Registered electors		30,425		
Unionist hold		Swing	–11.4	

1923 general election: Acton
Party	Candidate	Votes	%	±%
Unionist	Harry Brittain	8,943	44.9	–5.1
Labour	Herbert Baldwin	6,069	30.5	+4.3
Liberal	Bertram Levinson	4,909	24.6	+0.8
Majority		2,874	14.4	–9.4
Turnout		19,921	63.5	–3.7
Registered electors		31,394		
Unionist hold		Swing	–4.7	

1924 general election: Acton
Party	Candidate	Votes	%	±%
Unionist	Harry Brittain	12,799	55.1	+10.2
Labour	Herbert Baldwin	5,583	24.0	–6.4
Liberal	Bertram Levinson	3,074	13.2	–11.4
Democratic Labour	Mary Richardson	1,775	7.6	New
Majority		7,216	31.1	+16.6
Turnout		23,231	72.6	+9.1
Registered electors		31,999		
Unionist hold		Swing	+8.3	

1929 general election: Acton
Party	Candidate	Votes	%	±%
Labour	James Shillaker	13,208	41.4	+17.3
Unionist	Harry Brittain	12,739	39.9	–15.2
Liberal	Frank Medlicott	5,981	18.7	+5.5
Majority		469	1.5	N/A
Turnout		31,928	75.5	+2.9
Registered electors		42,276		
Labour gain from Unionist		Swing	+16.3	

=== Elections in the 1930s ===
1931 general election: Acton
Party	Candidate	Votes	%	±%
Conservative	Hubert Duggan	24,196	67.0	+27.1
Labour	James Shillaker	11,924	33.0	–8.4
Majority		12,272	34.0	N/A
Turnout		36,120	75.5	–0.1
Registered electors		47,865		
Conservative gain from Labour		Swing	+17.7	

1935 general election: Acton
Party	Candidate	Votes	%	±%
Conservative	Hubert Duggan	19,137	58.5	–8.5
Labour	William McLaine	13,559	41.5	+8.5
Majority		5,578	17.0	–17.0
Turnout		32,696	67.8	–7.7
Registered electors		48,258		
Conservative hold		Swing		

=== Elections in the 1940s ===
1943 Acton by-election
Party	Candidate	Votes	%	±%
Conservative	Henry Longhurst	5,014	60.3	+1.8
Ind. Labour Party	Walter Padley	2,336	28.1	New
Independent	Dorothy Crisp	707	8.5	New
Independent	Edward Godfrey (Note: Leader of the English National Association)	258	3.1	New
Majority		2,678	32.2	+15.1
Turnout		8,315	17.1	–50.7
Registered electors		48,663		
Conservative hold		Swing	+7.6	

1945 general election: Acton
Party	Candidate	Votes	%	±%
Labour	Joseph Sparks	19,590	56.1	+14.7
Conservative	Henry Longhurst	12,134	34.8	–23.8
Liberal	Francis Halpin	3,172	9.1	New
Majority		7,456	21.4	N/A
Turnout		34,896	77.7	+10.0
Registered electors		44,887		
Labour gain from Conservative		Swing	+19.2	

=== Elections in the 1950s ===
1950 general election: Acton
Party	Candidate	Votes	%	±%
Labour	Joseph Sparks	21,751	49.1	–7.1
Conservative	George Willment	19,116	43.1	+8.4
Liberal	Pauline Furniss	2,781	6.3	–2.8
Communist	Albert Papworth	663	1.5	New
Majority		2,635	5.9	–15.4
Turnout		44,311	87.6	+9.9
Registered electors		50,588		
Labour hold		Swing	–7.7	

1951 general election: Acton
Party	Candidate	Votes	%	±%
Labour	Joseph Sparks	23,287	52.2	+3.1
Conservative	Leslie Ramseyer	21,296	47.8	+4.6
Majority		1,991	4.5	–1.5
Turnout		44,583	86.9	–0.7
Registered electors		51,292		
Labour hold		Swing	–0.7	

1955 general election: Acton
Party	Candidate	Votes	%	±%
Labour	Joseph Sparks	20,645	50.6	+1.6
Conservative	John Bott	20,120	49.4	–1.6
Majority		525	1.2	–4.8
Turnout		40,765	82.6	–4.4
Registered electors		49,373		
Labour hold		Swing	–1.6	

1959 general election: Acton
Party	Candidate	Votes	%	±%
Conservative	Philip Holland	19,358	51.2	+1.9
Labour	Joseph Sparks	18,438	48.8	–1.9
Majority		920	2.4	N/A
Turnout		37,796	80.7	–1.9
Registered electors		46,835		
Conservative gain from Labour		Swing	+1.9	

=== Elections in the 1960s ===
1964 general election: Acton
Party	Candidate	Votes	%	±%
Labour	Bernard Floud	17,022	49.3	+0.6
Conservative	Philip Holland	14,423	41.8	–9.4
Liberal	Barwys Martin-Kaye	3,049	8.8	New
Majority		2,599	7.5	N/A
Turnout		34,494	77.4	–3.3
Registered electors		44,557		
Labour gain from Conservative		Swing	+5.0	

1966 general election: Acton
Party	Candidate	Votes	%	±%
Labour	Bernard Floud	18,541	57.7	+8.3
Conservative	Kenneth Baker	13,600	42.3	+0.5
Majority		4,941	15.4	+7.8
Turnout		32,141	74.0	–3.5
Registered electors		43,464		
Labour hold		Swing	+3.9	

1968 Acton by-election
Party	Candidate	Votes	%	±%
Conservative	Kenneth Baker	12,242	48.7	+6.4
Labour	Walter Johnson	8,522	33.9	–23.8
Liberal	Frank Davis	2,868	11.4	New
National Front	Andrew Fountaine	1,400	5.6	New
Independent	Harold Fox (Note: Fox stood under the label 'Independent Carnaby Street’ candidate.)	75	0.3	New
Independent	William Gold	44	0.2	New
Majority		3,720	14.8	N/A
Turnout		25,151	59.7	–14.2
Registered electors		42,103		
Conservative gain from Labour		Swing	+15.1	

=== Elections in the 1970s ===
1970 general election: Acton
Party	Candidate	Votes	%	±%
Labour	Nigel Spearing	13,960	48.0	–9.7
Conservative	Kenneth Baker	13,300	45.7	+3.4
Liberal	Dion Scherer	1,583	5.4	New
Communist	Maurice Costin	258	0.9	New
Majority		660	2.3	–13.1
Turnout		29,101	66.6	–7.3
Registered electors		43,670		
Labour hold		Swing	–6.6	

1970 notional result
Party	Vote	%
Conservative	21,400	49.7
Labour	18,700	43.4
Liberal	3,000	7.0
Turnout	43,100	66.0
Electorate	65,305	

February 1974 general election: Acton
Party	Candidate	Votes	%	±%
Conservative	George Young	18,492	43.3	–6.2
Labour	Nigel Spearing	17,041	39.9	–3.5
Liberal	Mario Uziell-Hamilton	7,160	16.8	+9.8
Majority		1,451	3.4	+1.1
Turnout		42,693	75.7	+9.7
Registered electors		56,365		
Conservative hold		Swing	–1.4	

October 1974 general election: Acton
Party	Candidate	Votes	%	±%
Conservative	George Young	17,669	45.2	+1.9
Labour	Glen Barnham	16,861	43.1	+3.1
Liberal	Mario Uziell-Hamilton	4,569	11.7	–5.1
Majority		808	2.1	–1.3
Turnout		39,199	69.0	–6.8
Registered electors		56,689		
Conservative hold		Swing	–0.7	

1979 general election: Acton
Party	Candidate	Votes	%	±%
Conservative	George Young	21,056	51.9	+6.7
Labour	Glen Barnham	15,258	37.6	–5.5
Liberal	Simon Rowley	3,549	8.7	–2.9
National Front	Clive Wakley	501	1.2	New
Independent	James O'Leary (Note: O'Leary stood under the label 'Irish National Party')	243	0.6	New
Majority		5,798	14.3	+12.2
Turnout		40,607	71.4	+2.4
Registered electors		56,875		
Conservative hold		Swing	+6.1	
