= Harry Brittain =

British journalist & politician (1873–1974)

Sir Harry Brittain KBE CMG

Member of Parliament for Acton
- In office 1918–1929
- Preceded by: Constituency established
- Succeeded by: James Shillaker

Personal details
- Born: Harry Ernest Brittain; 24 December 1873 Sheffield, England
- Died: 9 July 1974 (aged 100) Westminster, London, England
- Party: Conservative
- Spouses: Alida Luisa Harvey (m. 1905; died 1943) Muriel Leslie Dixon (m. 1961)
- Children: 2
- Education: Repton School; Rossall School
- Alma mater: Worcester College, Oxford

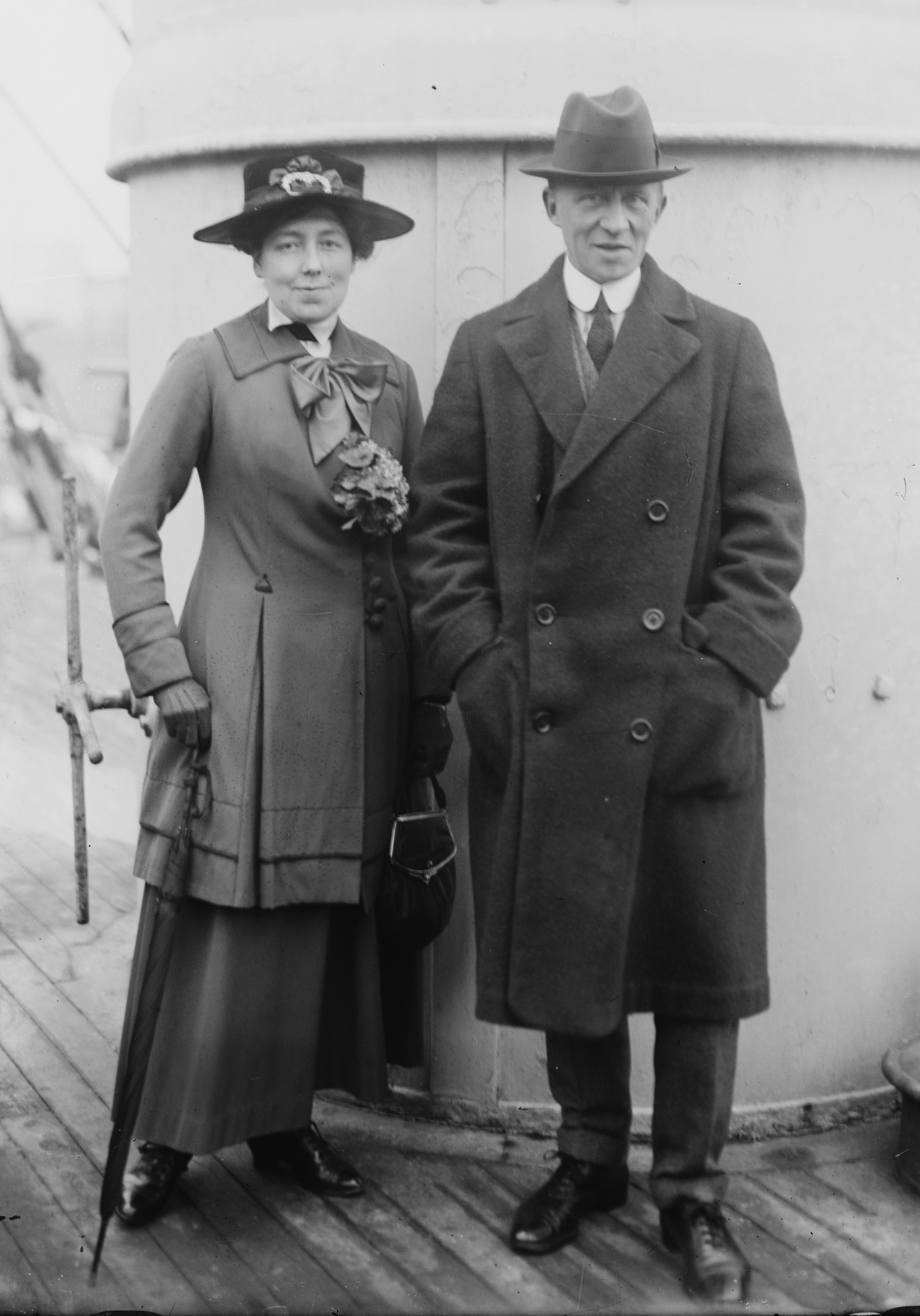
Sir Harry and Lady Brittain

Sir Harry Ernest Brittain, KBE, CMG (24 December 1873 – 9 July 1974) was a British journalist and Conservative politician.

== Biography ==
Brittain was born in Ranmoor, Sheffield, the son of W. H. Brittain. Following education at Repton School, Rossall School and Worcester College, Oxford (where he achieved third class honours in jurisprudence), he entered training in business at Sheffield. In 1897 he was called to the Bar at the Inner Temple, but did not practise.

== Journalism ==
Instead of law, Brittain developed an interest in journalism. He became an assistant to Sir William Ingram, managing director of the Illustrated London News. He subsequently worked for Sir Arthur Pearson, founder of the Daily Express. Brittain worked on the staff of The Standard and Evening Standard, two of Pearson's papers.

== Links with United States ==
Brittain tried to foster closer Anglo-American relations. To this end he founded the Pilgrims Society in 1902. For 17 years, first as honorary secretary and then as chairman, steered the Society through its early life. He resigned the chairmanship in 1918, because of his parliamentary duties, and became its senior vice-president, and the only Pilgrim Emeritus.

He was also a member of the original Committee of Sulgrave Manor Board, which was set up in 1914 to commemorate 100 years of peace between Great Britain and the United States. In addition to The Pilgrims, Brittain had many close associations with the United States. He was an honorary life member of the American Club, and the Society of Americans in London.

The United States entered the First World War on the side of the Allies in 1917. American officers started to come to London, and Brittain took on the task of organising an Officers' Club. King George V, when accompanied by Queen Mary, inspecting the club, expressed surprise that the chairs were so much more sumptuous than he could get for Buckingham Palace.

In May 1918 Brittain conducted a U.S. delegation, including a number of labour leaders, to the battlefields of France. The tour included personal visits to senior commanders including General Pershing, the American Commander-in-Chief in France, who paid Brittain high praise for his part in organising the American Officers' Club in London.

On 25 January 1972 he was the guest of honour at a dinner to celebrate the 70th Anniversary of the Pilgrims Society at which were read a message from Queen Elizabeth II and a personal letter to Brittain from the United States President, Richard Milhous Nixon.

== Commonwealth Press Union ==
In 1909 Brittain organised the First Imperial Press Conference. After the conference, he founded the Empire Press Union (later the Commonwealth Press Union) and lived to see his concept grow into an organisation which included in its membership over 1,500 newspapers and news agencies throughout the Commonwealth.

Brittain was an honorary life member of the CPU, attended many of its Quinquennial Conferences, regularly attended all its Council Meetings and Conferences, and in 1959 personally inaugurated its 50th (Golden Jubilee) Annual Conference.

Harry Brittain was also an Honorary Member of the Foreign Press Association, the Association of American Correspondents in London and the Institute of Journalists. For many years, until the Anschluss, he was the only foreign Director of the Neue Freie Presse of Vienna.

== Politics ==
Along with Pearson, Brittain formed the Tariff Reform League. This led him into Conservative politics. At the 1918 general election he received the "coupon" as the Coalition Conservative candidate for the newly created seat of Acton, Middlesex. He won the seat and held it until 1929, when an increase in the industrial working population of the constituency and a swing against the incumbent Conservative government saw him defeated by James Shillaker of the Labour Party. He is best remembered for steering the Protection of Birds Act 1925 (sometimes called the "Brittain Act") through parliament.

He was created KBE in 1918 for services in the First World War, and a CMG in 1924. He was also honoured by several continental countries for his international services. He visited 90 countries, crossed the Atlantic by sea more than 70 times and had been entertained in all 50 states of the US.

== Family life ==
In 1905, Brittain married Alida Luisa, daughter of Sir Robert Harvey, by whom he had a son and daughter. Created a Dame Commander of the DBE in 1929, Lady Brittain was a harpist, made member of the Celtic Congress (1933) and a Bard of the Gorsedd of Cornwall (Gorseth Kernow), using the name Colom Wyn or White Dove. She died in 1943.

In 1961, Brittain married Muriel Leslie Dixon. He died on 9 July 1974 in Westminster, London, at the age of 100.

Brittain wrote three books of reminiscences. He was the author of many publications including From Verdun to the Somme, which went through five editions in six days.

== Sources ==
- Leigh Rayment's Historical List of MPs

Parliament of the United Kingdom
New constituency	Member of Parliament for Acton; 1918 – 1929	Succeeded by James Shillaker
