= Gedling (constituency) =

UK Parliament constituency (since 1983)

Coordinates: 52.97°N 1.05°W

- County constituency for the House of Commons
- Interactive map of boundaries from 2024
- Location within the East Midlands
- County: Nottinghamshire
- Electorate: 75,795 (March 2020)
- Major settlements: Arnold, Burton Joyce, Carlton, Colwick, Gedling village and Woodthorpe

Current constituency
- Created: 1983
- Member of Parliament: Michael Payne (Labour)
- Seats: One
- Created from: Carlton

Gedling is a constituency in Nottinghamshire created in 1983 represented in the House of Commons of the UK Parliament since 2024 by Michael Payne of the Labour Party. (Note: A county constituency (for the purposes of election expenses and type of returning officer)) (Note: As with all constituencies, the constituency elects one Member of Parliament (MP) by the first past the post system of election at least every five years.) The seat (and its predecessor, Carlton) was safely Conservative until the Labour Party's landslide victory in 1997, when it was won for Labour by Vernon Coaker. Coaker and Labour held Gedling until 2019, when it was regained by the Conservative Party with Tom Randall. In 2024, the seat was regained by Michael Payne for Labour.

== Constituency profile ==
Gedling is a suburban constituency located in the Borough of Gedling in Nottinghamshire. It lies to the north-east of the city of Nottingham and covers suburban towns that form part of Nottingham's wider urban area but that lie outside the official city boundaries. It includes the connected towns and villages of Arnold, Carlton, Netherfield and Gedling and the outlying villages of Woodborough, Burton Joyce and Bestwood Village. There is some deprivation in Arnold, which has a history of textile manufacturing and was the birthplace of the 19th-century Luddite movement. The constituency was also traditionally a coal mining area. Gedling, Woodthorpe and the outlying villages are generally affluent, with these parts of the constituency falling within the top 10% least-deprived areas in England. The average house price in the constituency is lower than the rest of the East Midlands and considerably lower than the rest of the country.

In general, residents of the constituency are older than average, and levels of education, employment and income are similar to national averages. White people made up 89% of the population at the 2021 census. At the local district council, most of the constituency is represented by the Labour Party whilst the outlying villages elected Conservatives and Carlton elected Liberal Democrats. At the county council, which held elections more recently, Reform UK won in most parts of the constituency. An estimated 55% of voters in the constituency supported leaving the European Union in the 2016 referendum, marginally higher than the nationwide figure of 52%.

== Boundaries ==
=== Historic ===
Map of boundaries 2010–2024

1983–2010: The Borough of Gedling wards of Bonington, Burton Joyce and Stoke Bardolph, Carlton, Carlton Hill, Cavendish, Conway, Gedling, Killisick, Kingswell, Mapperley Plains, Netherfield, Oxclose, Phoenix, Porchester, Priory, St James, St Mary's, and Woodthorpe.

2010–2024: The Borough of Gedling wards of Bonington, Burton Joyce and Stoke Bardolph, Carlton, Carlton Hill, Daybrook, Gedling, Killisick, Kingswell, Mapperley Plains, Netherfield and Colwick, Phoenix, Porchester, St James, St Mary's, Valley, and Woodthorpe.

=== Current ===
Further to the 2023 review of Westminster constituencies, which came into effect for the 2024 general election, the constituency comprises the following wards of the Borough of Gedling:

- Bestwood St Albans, Carlton, Carlton Hill, Cavendish, Colwick, Coppice, Daybrook, Dumbles, Ernehale, Gedling, Netherfield, Phoenix, Plains, Porchester, Redhill, Trent Valley, and Woodthorpe.

The seat gained some rural areas to the north, including the Dumbles ward, from the Sherwood constituency.

== History ==
The constituency of Gedling was created in 1983, replacing the earlier Carlton constituency. Until 1997, it only elected candidates from the Conservative Party. The seat was represented by the former Carlton MP Sir Philip Holland until 1987, then for ten years by Andrew Mitchell, son of former Conservative MP David Mitchell. The Labour Party gained the seat in their landslide victory at the 1997 general election. At that election, the junior minister lost to Labour's Vernon Coaker, who retained the seat until the 2019 election.

Summary of results

The 2010 and 2015 results set the seat as marginal: first and second place were separated by less than 7%. At the 2005 general election, the Conservative candidate Anna Soubry (who was elected MP for nearby Broxtowe in 2010) caused controversy by revealing that she "was not proud" of the record of the area she was vying to represent, referring to crime levels in Nottingham — the subsequent swing from Labour to Conservative was only 2.1%, compared with the national swing of 3.1%. The 2015 result gave the seat the 29th-smallest majority of Labour's 232 seats by percentage of majority.

Other parties

In 2015, UKIP fielded the other candidate to retain their deposit. The party's swing nationally was +9.5% in 2015, and reached 11.4% in Gedling. Liberal Democrat and Green Party candidates forfeited their deposits in 2015.

Turnout

Turnout has varied from 82.3% of the vote in 1992 to 63.9% in 2001 and 2005.

== Members of Parliament ==
Carlton prior to 1983

Election	Member	Party
1983	Sir Philip Holland	Conservative
1987	Andrew Mitchell	Conservative
1997	Vernon Coaker	Labour
2019	Tom Randall	Conservative
2024	Michael Payne	Labour

== Elections ==
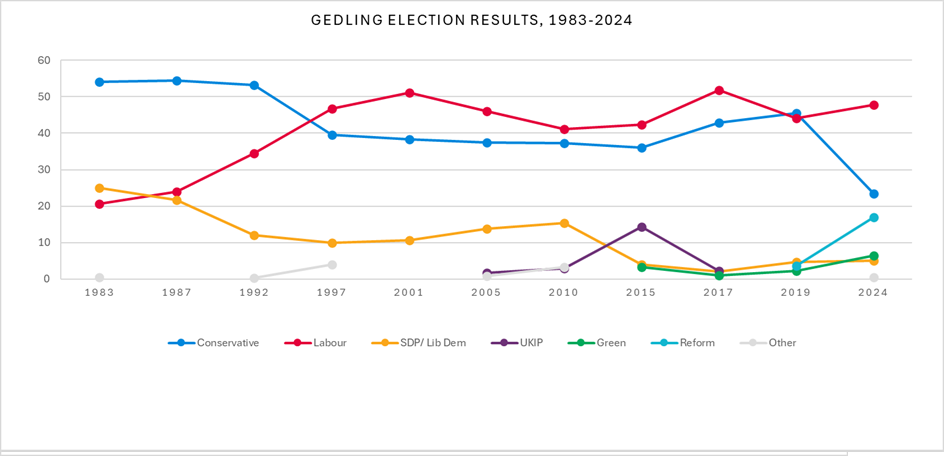
Gedling election results 1983-2024

=== Elections in the 2020s ===
General election 2024: Gedling
Party	Candidate	Votes	%	±%
Labour	Michael Payne	23,278	47.8	+5.0
Conservative	Tom Randall	11,397	23.4	−23.8
Reform	Simon Christy	8,211	16.9	+13.5
Green	Dominic Berry	3,122	6.4	+4.2
Liberal Democrats	Tad Jones	2,473	5.1	+0.6
Independent	Irenea Marriott	241	0.5	N/A
Majority		11,881	24.4	N/A
Turnout		48,722	63.3	−6.6
Registered electors		77,006		
Labour gain from Conservative		Swing	+14.4	

=== Elections in the 2010s ===
General election 2019: Gedling
Party	Candidate	Votes	%	±%
Conservative	Tom Randall	22,718	45.5	+2.7
Labour	Vernon Coaker	22,039	44.1	−7.8
Liberal Democrats	Anita Prabhakar	2,279	4.6	+2.6
Brexit Party	Graham Hunt	1,820	3.6	New
Green	Jim Norris	1,097	2.2	+1.2
Majority		679	1.4	N/A
Turnout		49,953	69.9	−2.6
Conservative gain from Labour		Swing	+5.2	

General election 2017: Gedling
Party	Candidate	Votes	%	±%
Labour	Vernon Coaker	26,833	51.9	+9.6
Conservative	Carolyn Abbott	22,139	42.8	+6.7
UKIP	Lee Waters	1,143	2.2	−12.2
Liberal Democrats	Robert Swift	1,052	2.0	−2.0
Green	Rebecca Connick	515	1.0	−2.2
Majority		4,694	9.1	+2.9
Turnout		51,682	72.5	+4.0
Labour hold		Swing	+1.4	

General election 2015: Gedling
Party	Candidate	Votes	%	±%
Labour	Vernon Coaker	20,307	42.3	+1.2
Conservative	Carolyn Abbott	17,321	36.1	−1.2
UKIP	Lee Waters	6,930	14.4	+11.4
Liberal Democrats	Robert Swift	1,906	4.0	−11.3
Green	Jim Norris	1,534	3.2	New
Majority		2,986	6.2	+2.4
Turnout		47,998	68.5	+0.6
Labour hold		Swing	+1.2	

General election 2010: Gedling
Party	Candidate	Votes	%	±%
Labour	Vernon Coaker	19,821	41.1	−5.5
Conservative	Bruce Laughton	17,962	37.3	+0.3
Liberal Democrats	Julia Bateman	7,350	15.3	+1.5
BNP	Stephen Adcock	1,598	3.3	New
UKIP	David Marshall	1,459	3.0	+1.3
Majority		1,859	3.8	−5.8
Turnout		48,190	67.9	+4.0
Labour hold		Swing	−2.9	

Because of boundary changes, vote shares in 2010 are compared to notional results from 2005.

=== Elections in the 2000s ===
General election 2005: Gedling
Party	Candidate	Votes	%	±%
Labour	Vernon Coaker	20,329	46.1	−5.0
Conservative	Anna Soubry	16,518	37.5	−0.8
Liberal Democrats	Raymond Poynter	6,070	13.8	+3.2
UKIP	Alan Margerison	741	1.7	New
Veritas	Deborah Johnson	411	0.9	New
Majority		3,811	8.6	−4.2
Turnout		44,069	63.9	0.0
Labour hold		Swing	−2.1	

General election 2001: Gedling
Party	Candidate	Votes	%	±%
Labour	Vernon Coaker	22,383	51.1	+4.3
Conservative	Jonathan Bullock	16,785	38.3	−1.2
Liberal Democrats	Tony Gillam	4,648	10.6	+0.7
Majority		5,598	12.8	+5.5
Turnout		43,816	63.9	−11.8
Labour hold		Swing	+2.7	

=== Elections in the 1990s ===
General election 1997: Gedling
Party	Candidate	Votes	%	±%
Labour	Vernon Coaker	24,390	46.8	+12.4
Conservative	Andrew Mitchell	20,588	39.5	−13.7
Liberal Democrats	Raymond Poynter	5,180	9.9	−2.2
Referendum	John Connor	2,006	3.9	New
Majority		3,802	7.3	N/A
Turnout		52,164	75.7	−6.6
Labour gain from Conservative		Swing	+13.1	

General election 1992: Gedling
Party	Candidate	Votes	%	±%
Conservative	Andrew Mitchell	30,191	53.2	−1.3
Labour	Vernon Coaker	19,554	34.4	+10.5
Liberal Democrats	DG George	6,863	12.1	−9.5
Natural Law	AKL Miszeweka	168	0.3	New
Majority		10,637	18.8	−11.8
Turnout		56,776	82.3	+3.2
Conservative hold		Swing	−5.9	

=== Elections in the 1980s ===
General election 1987: Gedling
Party	Candidate	Votes	%	±%
Conservative	Andrew Mitchell	29,492	54.5	+0.4
Labour	Vernon Coaker	12,953	23.9	+3.3
SDP	David Morton	11,684	21.6	−3.4
Majority		16,539	30.6	+1.5
Turnout		54,129	79.1	+3.7
Conservative hold		Swing		

General election 1983: Gedling
Party	Candidate	Votes	%	±%
Conservative	Philip Holland	27,207	54.1	
SDP	Adrian Berkeley	12,543	25.0	
Labour	John Peck	10,330	20.6	
Independent	J Szatter	186	0.4	
Majority		14,664	29.1	
Turnout		50,080	75.4	
Conservative win (new seat)				

== See also ==
- parliamentary constituencies in Nottinghamshire
