= Vernon Coaker =

British politician and life peer (born 1953)

The Right Honourable The Lord Coaker
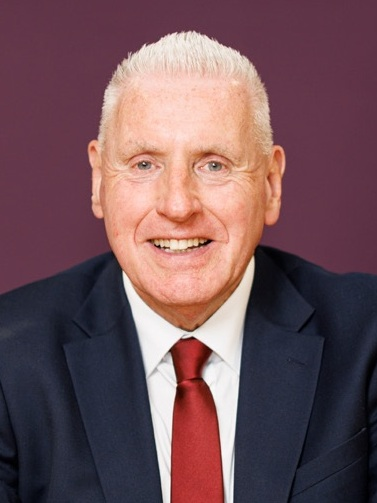
- Official portrait, 2025

Minister of State for Defence
- Incumbent
- Assumed office 8 July 2024
- Prime Minister: Keir Starmer; Andy Burnham
- Preceded by: The Earl of Minto

Minister of State for Schools and Learners
- In office 8 June 2009 – 11 May 2010
- Prime Minister: Gordon Brown
- Preceded by: Jim Knight
- Succeeded by: Nick Gibb

Minister of State for Policing, Crime and Security
- In office 3 October 2008 – 8 June 2009
- Prime Minister: Gordon Brown
- Preceded by: Tony McNulty
- Succeeded by: David Hanson

Lord Commissioner of the Treasury
- In office 10 May 2005 – 5 May 2006
- Prime Minister: Tony Blair
- Preceded by: Jim Murphy
- Succeeded by: Alan Campbell
Shadow cabinet portfolios
Shadow Secretary of State for Northern Ireland
In office 13 September 2015 – 26 June 2016
Leader	Jeremy Corbyn
Preceded by	Ivan Lewis
Succeeded by	Dave Anderson
In office 7 October 2011 – 7 October 2013
Leader	Ed Miliband
Preceded by	Shaun Woodward
Succeeded by	Ivan Lewis
Shadow Secretary of State for Defence
In office 7 October 2013 – 13 September 2015
Leader	Ed Miliband; Harriet Harman (acting)
Preceded by	Jim Murphy
Succeeded by	Maria Eagle
Parliamentary offices
Member of the House of Lords
Lord Temporal
Life peerage 22 March 2021
Member of Parliament for Gedling
In office 1 May 1997 – 6 November 2019
Preceded by	Andrew Mitchell
Succeeded by	Tom Randall

Personal details
- Born: Vernon Rodney Coaker; 17 June 1953 (age 73) Westminster, London, England
- Party: Labour
- Spouse: Jacqueline Heaton (m. 1978)
- Children: 2
- Education: University of Warwick (BA)

Vernon Rodney Coaker, Baron Coaker (born 17 June 1953) is a British politician and life peer who has served as Minister of State for Defence since 2024. A member of the Labour Party, he was the Member of Parliament (MP) for Gedling from 1997 to 2019.

Coaker served in government as Minister of State for Policing, Crime and Security from 2008 to 2009, and Minister of State for Schools and Learning from 2009 to 2010. In opposition, he was Shadow Secretary of State for Defence from 2013 to 2015 and Shadow Secretary of State for Northern Ireland from 2011 to 2013, and again from 2015 to 2016. Coaker lost his seat at the 2019 general election.

== Early life ==
Born in Westminster, London, Coaker attended Drayton Manor Grammar School in London. He studied for an Economics and Politics BA (Hons) degree at the University of Warwick, then obtained a PGCE at Trent Polytechnic (Clifton College of Education).

Coaker worked as a teacher, becoming a history teacher at Manvers Pierrepont School (now the Carlton Road Centre of Castle College Nottingham) from 1976 to 1982, then head of department at Arnold Hill School from 1982 to 1988. From 1989 to 1995, he was a senior teacher at Bramcote Park School and thence until 1997 he was deputy headmaster at Big Wood School in Bestwood, Nottingham. He is a member of the NUT.

== Political career ==
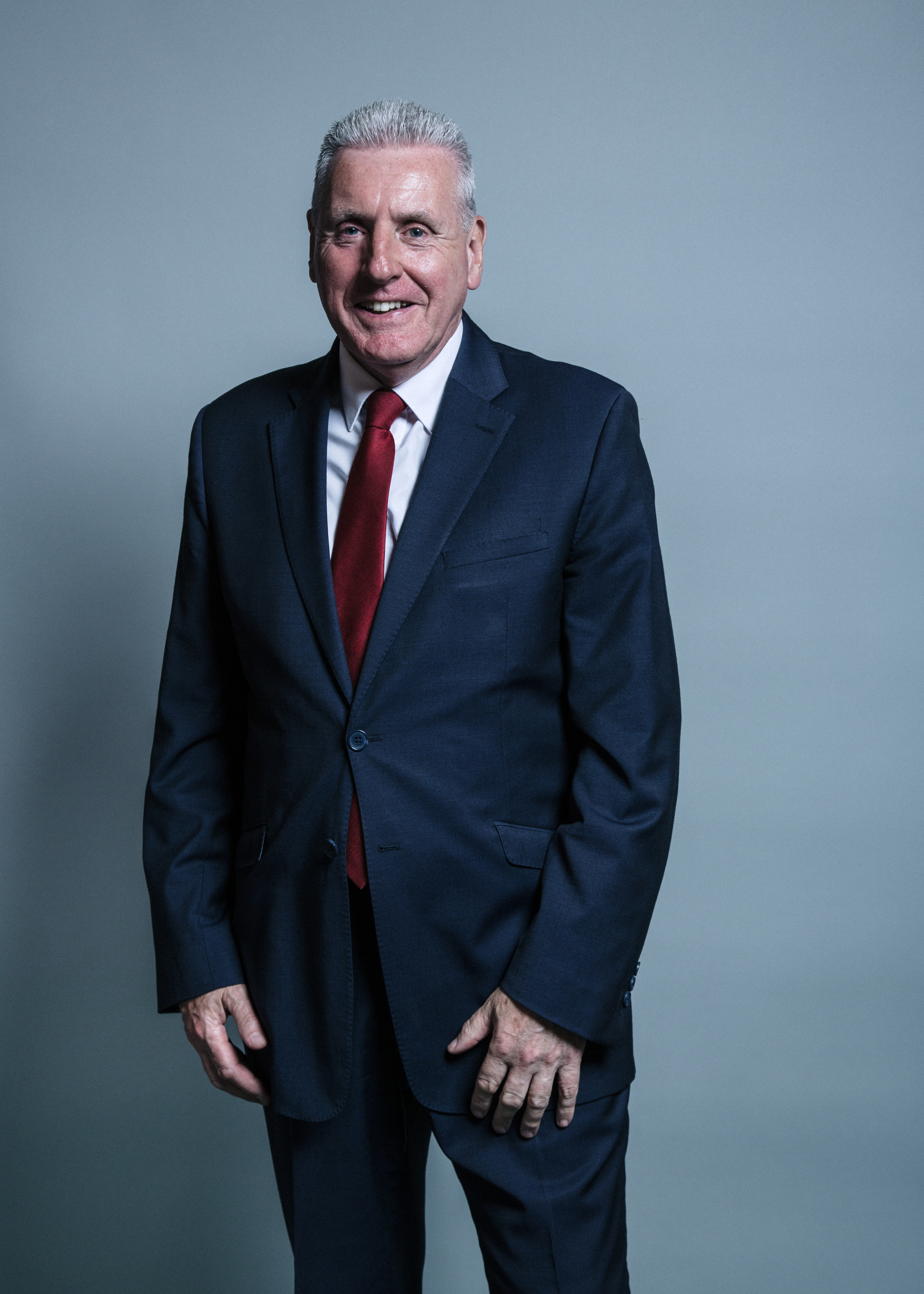
Official portrait, 2017

Coaker served as a district councillor for the Cotgrave Ward in Rushcliffe, Nottinghamshire from 1983 to 1997 and was leader of the Labour group on the council between 1987 and 1997. He stood for the Rushcliffe constituency seat in 1983. He contested Gedling in 1987 and 1992, before defeating Andrew Mitchell at the 1997 election, becoming the first Labour MP to win the Gedling seat.

After a number of parliamentary private secretary roles, Coaker became a government whip in May 2005, having been an assistant whip since June 2003. He served as a minister of state at the Home Office between 2008 and 2009 before being moved to take up the role of minister of state for schools and learning between 2009 and 2010.

Following the Labour defeat at the 2010 general election, Coaker was appointed as Shadow Secretary of State for Northern Ireland in October 2011. Coaker joined dozens of shadow ministers in resigning from his position on 26 June 2016 in Labour's parliamentary disquiet over the leadership of Jeremy Corbyn. He supported Owen Smith in the failed attempt to replace Jeremy Corbyn in the 2016 Labour leadership election. He lost his seat in the 2019 general election.

In December 2020, it was announced he would be conferred a life peerage after a nomination by Labour Party Leader Keir Starmer. On 3 February 2021, he was created as Baron Coaker, of Gedling in the County of Nottinghamshire. He made his maiden speech on 17 May 2021 during the Queen's Speech debate, and was later appointed to the front bench as a Home Affairs and Defence spokesperson.

After the 2024 United Kingdom general election, he was appointed by Keir Starmer to the Labour government as Defence Minister.

In July 2026, he was reappointed to the new government as Minister of State at the Ministry of Defence by Andy Burnham.

== Expenses scandal ==
Coaker was found to have claimed large sums every month in cash for his second home without submitting any receipts. Over the course of four years, he claimed £3,425 for cleaning, £6,320 for services and maintenance and £5,205 for repairs. This was initially for his semi-detached home in Cotgrave, and then for his one-bedroom flat in Kennington in London.

A spokesman for Coaker subsequently stated that expenses were claimed in accordance with the rules administered by Commons fees office at the time.

== Political positions ==
Coaker supports the modernisation of the UK Trident missile system, and Britain's membership of NATO. He supports the multilateral disarmament of nuclear weapons. Coaker belongs to the Labour Friends of Israel lobby group.

Shortly after being appointed minister for drugs and crime reduction in the May 2006 reshuffle, he revealed to the Coventry Evening Telegraph that he had had "one or two puffs" of cannabis as a student but did not enjoy it. His admission was made during a nationwide tour to evaluate the effectiveness of the government's drugs strategy.

He also supports people taking part in shooting sports and angling.

In January 2010, Coaker apologised for remarks that misled MPs. He had earlier told MPs that 70 police officers were hurt as a result of a global warming protest at Kingsnorth power station. In fact there were only 12 injuries that were legally reportable with just four of those involving contact with another person. The remaining eight injuries included "wasp sting", an injury while "sitting in a car", and an officer succumbing "to sun and heat". There were 68 injuries in total with the rest being treated by first-aiders at the scene. The whole operation had involved more than 1,000 officers.

== Personal life ==
Coaker married Jacqueline Heaton on 23 December 1978 in Basford in Nottingham; the couple have a daughter and a son. He supports Tottenham Hotspur. His wife, who is a teacher, was a town councillor in Cotgrave, where they live in the district of Rushcliffe.

== Honours ==
- He was awarded an Honorary Professorship of Modern Slavery Policy by the University of Nottingham on 23 July 2020.
- He was awarded the Freedom of the Borough of Gedling on 17 June 2022.

Parliament of the United Kingdom
Preceded by Andrew Mitchell	Member of Parliament for Gedling; 1997–2019	Succeeded by Tom Randall
Political offices
Preceded by Jim Murphy	Lord Commissioner of the Treasury; 2005–2006	Succeeded by Alan Campbell
Preceded by Tony McNulty as Minister of State for Security, Counter-Terrorism, Crime and Policing	Minister of State for Policing, Crime and Security; 2008–2009	Succeeded by David Hanson as Minister of State for Security, Counter-Terrorism, Crime and Policing
Preceded by Jim Knight	Minister of State for Schools and Learners; 2009–2010	Succeeded by Nick Gibb
Preceded by Shaun Woodward	Shadow Secretary of State for Northern Ireland; 2011–2013	Succeeded by Ivan Lewis
Preceded by Jim Murphy	Shadow Secretary of State for Defence; 2013–2015	Succeeded by Maria Eagle
Preceded by Ivan Lewis	Shadow Secretary of State for Northern Ireland; 2015–2016	Succeeded by Dave Anderson
Orders of precedence in the United Kingdom
Preceded by The Lord Parker of Minsmere	Gentlemen; Baron Coaker	Followed by The Lord Khan of Burnley
