= Alfred Daniel Hall =

British college administrator (1864–1942)

Sir Alfred Daniel Hall, KCB FRS, sometimes known as Sir Daniel Hall (22 June 1864 - 5 July 1942) was a British agricultural educator and researcher who founded Wye College.

Hall was born in Rochdale, Lancashire where his father Edwin Hall was a flannel manufacturer. As a young boy he interacted with a naturalist group where one member collected mosses while another collected fossils and in time he too began to collect fossils in Rochdale, accompanying the Borough Surveyor S.S. Platt. He attended a private school of Theodore B. Pickles and received a scholarship to Manchester Grammar School in 1876. He studied science under Francis Jones and received a Brackenbury Scholarship at Balliol College, Oxford, joining in 1881. He received a first in natural science (chemistry) in 1884 and became a schoolmaster at Blairlodge Academy followed by teaching at Hulme Grammar School, Manchester and in 1888, Senior Science Master at King Edward's School, Birmingham.

He married Mary Brooks, sister of a friend, while teaching at Birmingham. In 1891 he joined the University Extension Board and he sought to establish an agriculture college for which he selected Wye and through E.J. Halsey, the chairman of the County Council, space and resources were allocated for the establishment of the Wye College. The founding staff included Herbert Henry Cousins, chemist, John Percival, botanist, Frank Braybrooke Smith, agriculturist, and F.V. Theobald, entomologist. Hall handled the teaching of chemistry. The college was formally opened in 1894 and had fourteen students. In 1902 he was persuaded to leave Wye and help rejuvenate research at the Rothamsted Laboratory. In 1912 he left Rothamsted to work with the Development Commission. In 1919 he became a director of the John Innes Horticultural Institution and was also a part-time advisor for the Ministry of Agriculture. He was elected as a Fellow of the Royal Society in 1909 and made KCB in 1918.

== Works ==
- Hall, A Daniel (1940). The genus Tulipa. London: Royal Horticultural Society. LCCN agr41000420; viii+171 pages with 40 illustrations in colour by H. C. Osterstock

Government offices
Preceded by Sir Sydney Olivier	Permanent Secretary of the Board of Agriculture and Fisheries; 1917–1919	Succeeded by Sir Francis Floud (as Permanent Secretary, Ministry of Agriculture and Fisheries)
