= Carlton (constituency) =

Former UK parliamentary constituency

- Former county constituency for the House of Commons
- County: Nottinghamshire
- Major settlements: Carlton

1950–1983
- Seats: One
- Created from: Broxtowe, Newark and Rushcliffe
- Replaced by: Gedling and Sherwood

Carlton was a constituency in Nottinghamshire which returned one Member of Parliament (MP) to the House of Commons of the Parliament of the United Kingdom from 1950 until it was abolished for the 1983 general election. It was then partly replaced by the new Gedling constituency.

== Boundaries ==
1950–1974: The Urban Districts of Arnold and Carlton, the Rural District of Bingham, and in the Rural District of Basford the parishes of Burton Joyce, Calverton, Lambley, Stoke Bardolph, and Woodborough.

1974–1983: The Urban Districts of Arnold and Carlton, and in the Rural District of Basford the parishes of Bestwood Park, Burton Joyce, Calverton, Lambley, Linby, Newstead, Papplewick, Stoke Bardolph, and Woodborough.

== Members of Parliament ==
Election	Member	Party
1950	Sir Kenneth Pickthorn	Conservative
1966	Philip Holland	Conservative
1983	constituency abolished: see Gedling	

== Elections ==
=== Elections in the 1950s ===
General election 1950: Carlton
Party	Candidate	Votes	%	±%
Conservative	Kenneth Pickthorn	19,585	40.84	
Labour	Florence Paton	19,190	40.02	
Liberal	Cornelius Charles Kirk	9,176	19.14	
Majority		395	0.82	
Turnout		47,951	87.17	
Conservative win (new seat)				

General election 1951: Carlton
Party	Candidate	Votes	%	±%
Conservative	Kenneth Pickthorn	24,429	49.81	+8.97
Labour	Florence Paton	20,685	42.18	+2.16
Liberal	Gerald Wortley H Parker	3,930	8.01	−11.13
Majority		3,744	7.63	
Turnout		49,044		
Conservative hold		Swing		

General election 1955: Carlton
Party	Candidate	Votes	%	±%
Conservative	Kenneth Pickthorn	27,521	57.1	+7.3
Labour	Florence Paton	20,664	42.9	+0.7
Majority		6,857	14.2	+6.6
Turnout		48,185		
Conservative hold		Swing		

General election 1959: Carlton
Party	Candidate	Votes	%	±%
Conservative	Kenneth Pickthorn	30,722	57.6	+0.5
Labour	Philip Myers	22,645	42.4	−0.5
Majority		8,077	15.2	+1.0
Turnout		53,367		
Conservative hold		Swing		

=== Elections in the 1960s ===
General election 1964: Carlton
Party	Candidate	Votes	%	±%
Conservative	Kenneth Pickthorn	27,896	46.9	−10.7
Labour	Robert B Mellor	21,546	36.2	−6.2
Liberal	Max G Payne	10,034	16.9	New
Majority		6,350	10.7	−4.5
Turnout		59,476		
Conservative hold		Swing		

General election 1966: Carlton
Party	Candidate	Votes	%	±%
Conservative	Philip Holland	28,635	45.6	−1.3
Labour	Amos Lloyd Ramsden	24,589	39.2	+3.0
Liberal	Max G Payne	9,570	15.2	−1.7
Majority		4,046	6.4	−4.3
Turnout		62,794	82.5	
Conservative hold		Swing		

=== Elections in the 1970s ===
General election 1970: Carlton
Party	Candidate	Votes	%	±%
Conservative	Philip Holland	39,840	59.6	+14.0
Labour	Carl Bennett	27,043	40.4	+1.2
Majority		12,797	19.2	+12.8
Turnout		66,883	84.51	+2.0
Conservative hold		Swing		

General election February 1974: Carlton
Party	Candidate	Votes	%	±%
Conservative	Philip Holland	27,305	45.37	−14.23
Labour	James Murray	20,147	33.58	−6.92
Liberal	Donald Lawrence Lange	11,282	18.75	New
National Front	Cyril Marriott	1,449	2.41	New
Majority		7,158	11.79	−7.21
Turnout		60,183	84.48	−0.03
Conservative hold		Swing		

General election October 1974: Carlton
Party	Candidate	Votes	%	±%
Conservative	Philip Holland	24,638	44.16	−1.21
Labour	Dennis Pettitt	20,019	35.88	+2.41
Liberal	Donald Lawrence Lange	9,859	17.67	−1.07
National Front	Cyril Marriott	1,273	2.28	−0.13
Majority		4,619	8.28	−3.51
Turnout		55,789	77.74	−6.74
Conservative hold		Swing	−1.81	

General election 1979: Carlton
Party	Candidate	Votes	%	±%
Conservative	Philip Holland	31,762	52.56	+8.39
Labour	Arthur Palmer	18,989	31.42	−4.46
Liberal	John Frederick West	9,077	15.02	−2.65
National Front	Michael John Watts	606	1.00	−1.28
Majority		12,773	21.14	+12.86
Turnout		60,434	78.90	+1.16
Conservative hold		Swing	+6.43	
