= Ministry of Home Security =

Former British government department

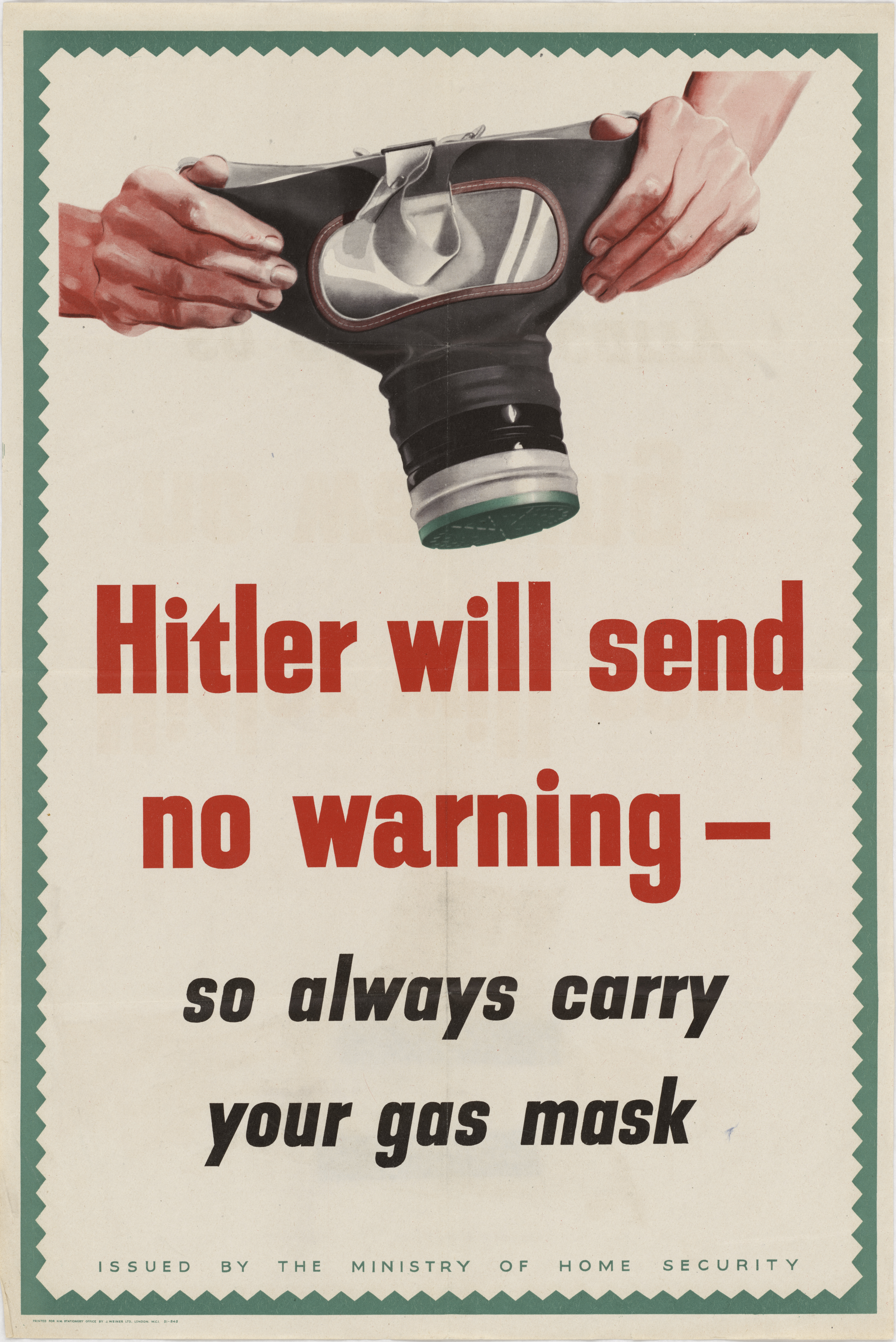
Ministry of Home Security poster used during the "Phoney War"

The Ministry of Home Security was a British government department established in 1939 to direct national civil defence during the Second World War, and primarily tasked with organising air raid precautions (ARP). It was at first headed by Sir John Anderson, the Home Secretary and Minister of Home Security. The ministry's responsibilities covered all central and regional civil defence organisations, such as air raid wardens, rescue squads, fire services, and the Women's Voluntary Service. It was also responsible for giving approval to local ARP schemes and providing public shelters.

The ministry, run under the auspices of the Home Office, produced hundreds of leaflets that were delivered to the population and advised on how to deal with the impending air raids. It also managed propaganda poster campaigns, such as to encourage the carrying of gas masks and to encourage volunteers to join civil defence groups like the Fire Guards.

In October 1940, Sir John Anderson was replaced by Herbert Morrison in a reshuffle that was precipitated by Neville Chamberlain's resignation owing to ill health.

With the Allied victory in Europe, the Ministry was disbanded in May 1945.

== Background ==
Surprisingly, little had been done to defend against attacks on the civilian population during the First World War, and a need for such measures was seen in the years before 1939, so that plans for the new Ministry were in place when war broke out.

== Organisation ==
The ministry came into existence following the passing of an order within the Ministers of the Crown (Emergency Appointments) Act 1939. This order transferred to the Minister of Home Security the statutory powers of the Home Secretary, the Secretary of State for Scotland and the Lord Privy Seal.

The former Lord Privy Seal, Sir John Anderson, was appointed the first Minister of Home Security and Home Secretary. The new department he headed combined the Lord Privy Seal's Office and the Home Office Air Raid Precautions Department (ARP). Additional staff were recruited from other government ministries as well as local authorities. The ministry also took over control of the Industrial Air Raid Precautions Division from the Air Ministry.

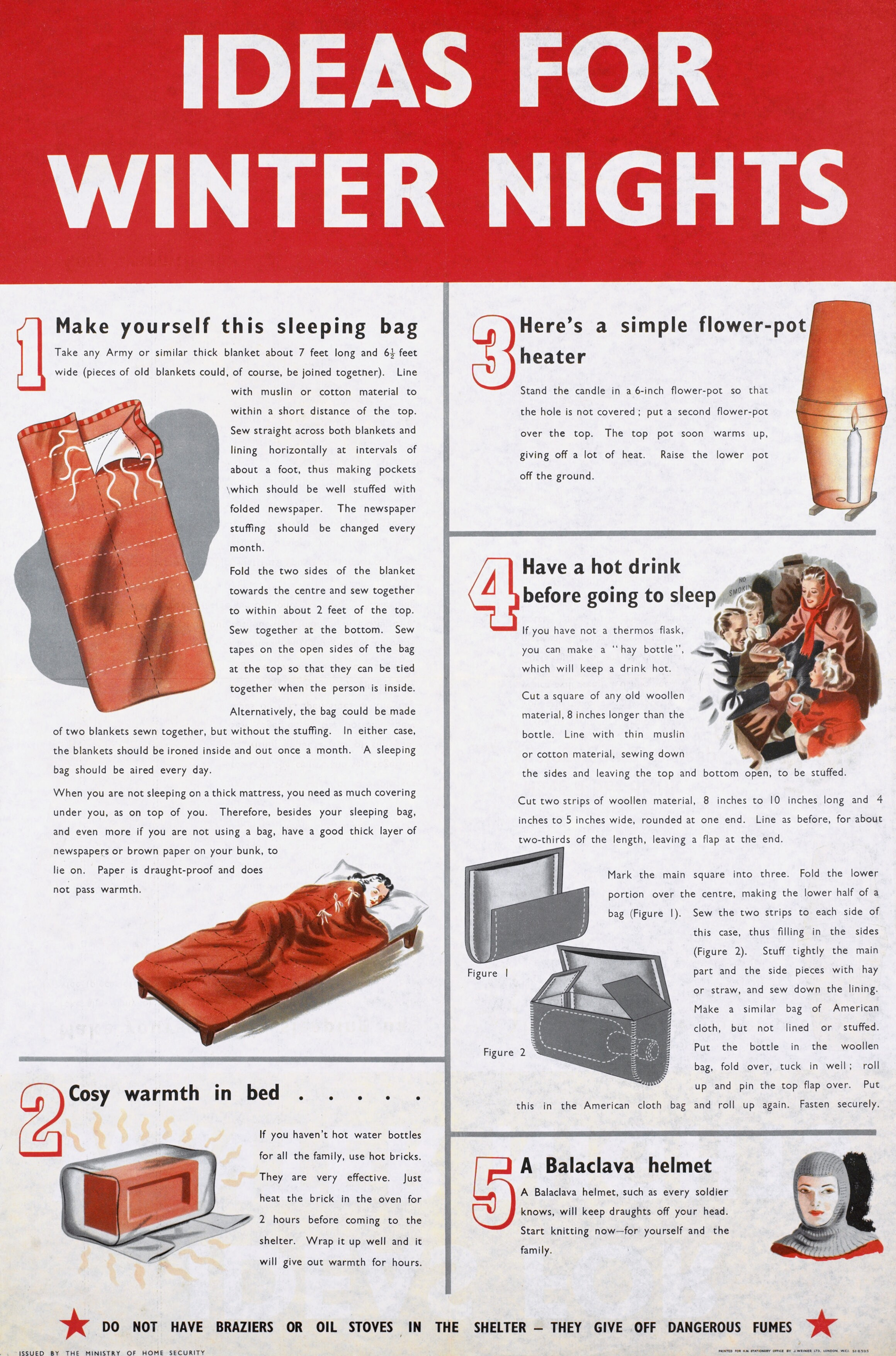
Informational poster from the Ministry of Home Security, instructing civilians on how to stay warm and safe in an air raid shelter

The ministry was responsible for two key wartime issues: firstly, the coordination of all the civil defence services provided by other departments; and secondly, the overseeing of its own central and regional services and local authority civil defence services – including the approval of all ARP schemes, oversight of local authority civil defence services, arranging, building and delivering air raid shelters, sounding of air raid warnings (from 1943), the supply of ARP equipment, and the co-ordination and supervision of the civil defence regional organisation, which included the Civil Defence Rescue Service, Air Raid Warden Service, Fire Guard Service, Shelter Service, Women's Voluntary Service and the Civil Defence Reserve.

The ministry set up 12 civil defence regions, each with a regional commissioner that coordinated, from May 1940, all local authority services. A central Home Security War Room in London collated information from 12 regional war rooms concerning air raids, casualties and where necessary the movement of civil defence personnel between regions.

At its inception the ministry was organised in five divisions:

1. Air Raid Precautions Department
2. Fire and Police Services Division
3. Regional Organisation Division and Home Security War Room
4. Inspector General's Department
5. Public Relations and Civil Defence Personnel Division

=== Ministry dissolved ===
With victory in Europe in May 1945, the ministry was dissolved; any residual departments and functions were to fall under the control of the Home Office.

== Structure and responsibilities ==
Twelve commissioners, acting for the government, were appointed to manage twelve regions of the United Kingdom. Their responsibilities included providing air raid shelters and air raid wardens, gas identification officers, ambulances, and rescue operations. Millions of gas masks were distributed, and almost five million people were enrolled as fire watchers and firefighters. The Ministry also had the task of making preparations for the possibility of an invasion, including plans for the British national communications infrastructure being destroyed by enemy action.

From 1939, there were twelve regional War Rooms and a national War Room. From 1941, the Ministry's central war room was in the North Rotunda, Great Peter Street, London.

A5 size 'What To Do About Gas' handbill circa 1941 regarding possible poison gas attack that refers to ARP Posts

== Ministers of Home Security ==
- 1939–1940: Sir John Anderson MP
- 1940–1945: Herbert Morrison MP

== Notable personnel ==
- John Baker, Baron Baker – scientific adviser to the Ministry's Design and Development Section, 1939–1943
- Moses Blackman – scientific adviser, 1942–1945
- Peter Floud – principal of the London Regional Headquarters, 1939–1944
