= Alida Brittain =

British harpist (1883–1943)

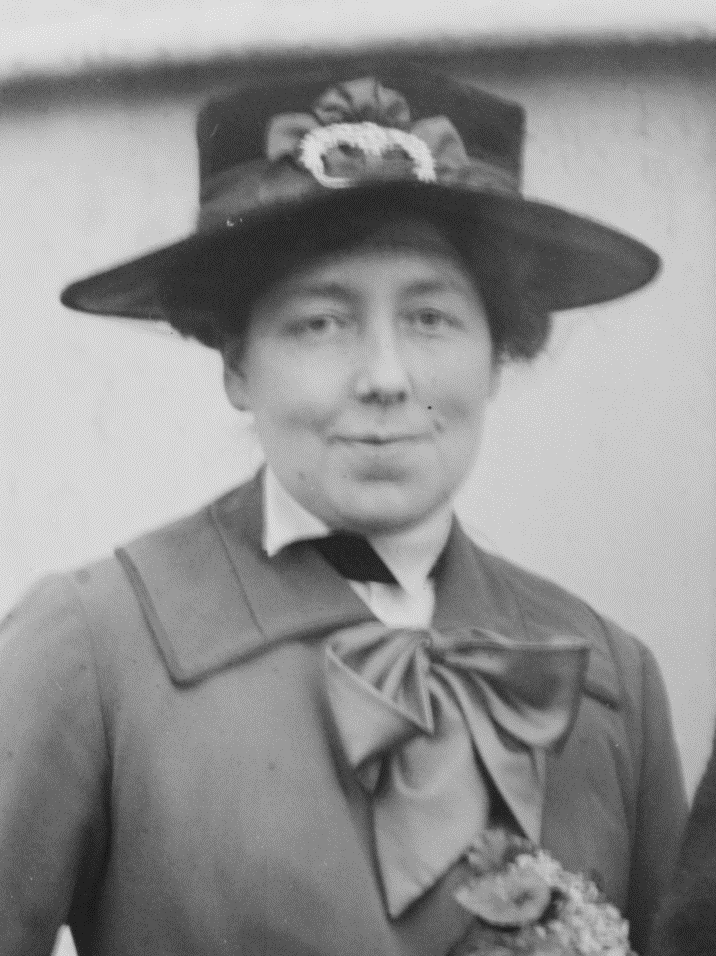

Background information
- Born: 12 June 1883; Iquique (present-day Chile)
- Died: 5 January 1943 (aged 59) Headley, Hampshire, UK
- Instrument: Harp

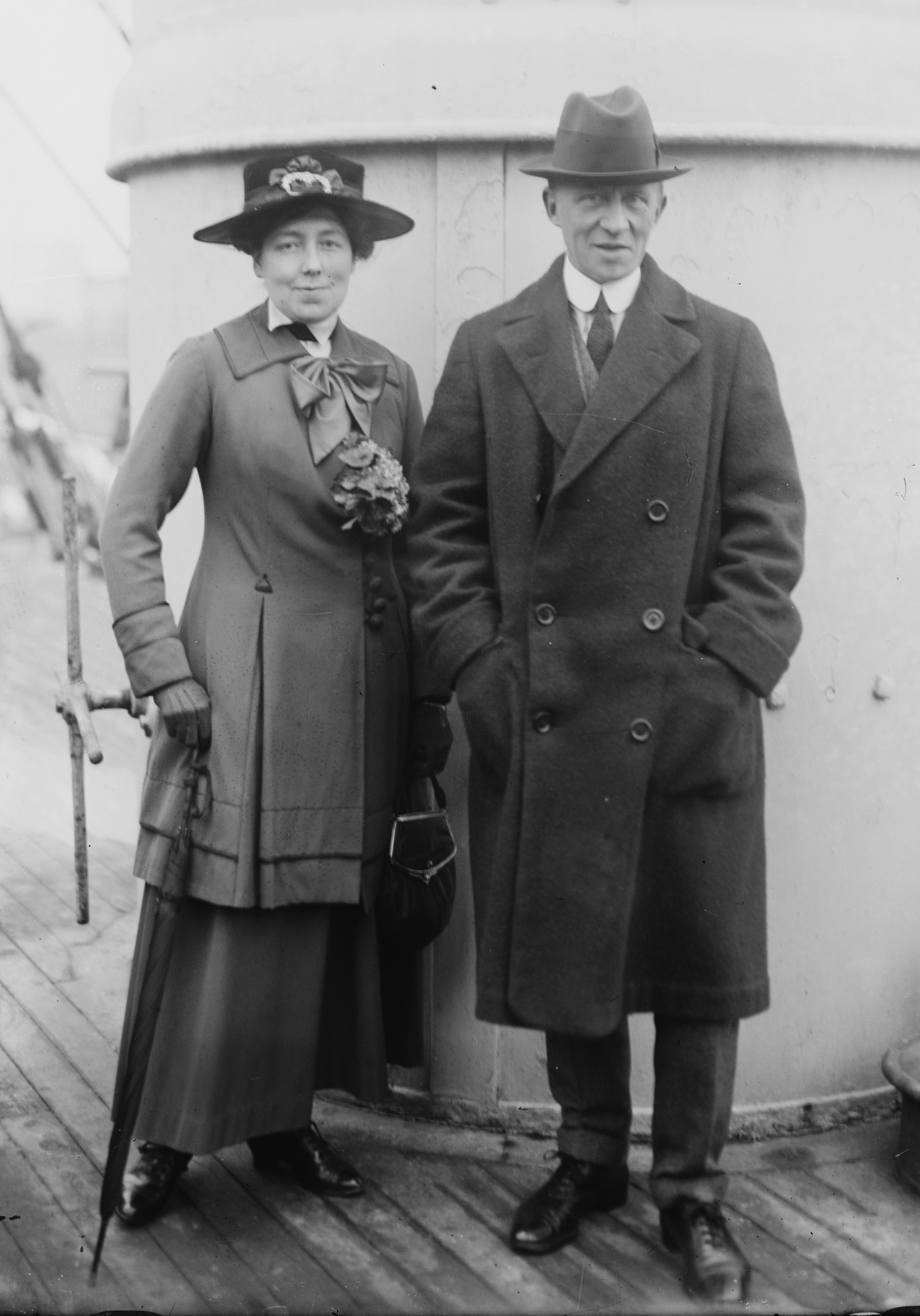
Lady Brittain and her husband, Sir Harry Brittain

Dame Alida Luisa Brittain, Lady Brittain DBE (née Harvey; 12 June 1883 – 5 January 1943) was a British harpist. She was the wife of politician and journalist Sir Harry Brittain.

The only daughter of businessman Sir Robert Harvey and Franco-Peruvian Alida María Godefroy, Alida was born in Iquique (then in Peru), where her father made millions as a saltpetre producer. Her maternal grandfather was Émile Godefroy of Pessac, Bordeaux. In 1885, the family returned to Cornwall, where her father purchased the Trenoweth estate and several properties in nearby Devon. She had five younger brothers, including politician Sir Samuel Emile Harvey.

A noted harpist and composer, she was elected a Bard of the Cornish Gorseth. In 1927, she was honorary musical director of the National Conservative Musical Union. She served as president of the Society of Women Journalists from 1929–32, and was a Member of the Celtic Congress in 1933.

She was created a Dame Commander of the Order of the British Empire in the 1929 New Year Honours, for political and public services.

She married Harry Brittain in 1905. They had two children: Robert Edmund Godefroy Brittain and Alida Gwendolen Rosemary Brittain.

She died suddenly at home in Headley, Hampshire, in 1943, aged 59.

== Legacy ==
Alida, Saskatchewan is named in her honour.
