= Tom Randall (politician) =

British Conservative politician

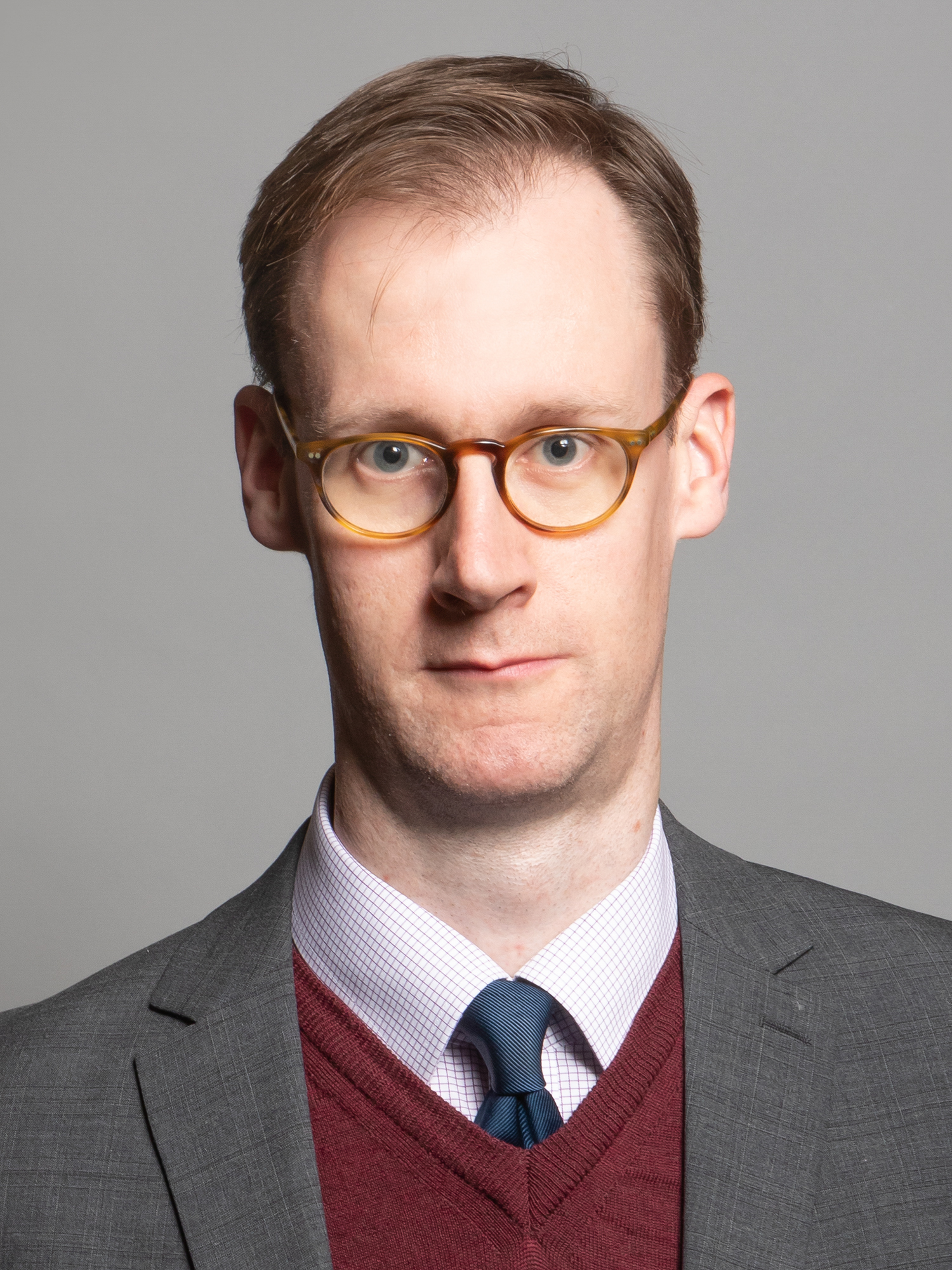
- Official portrait, 2020

Member of Parliament for Gedling
- In office 12 December 2019 – 30 May 2024
- Preceded by: Vernon Coaker
- Succeeded by: Michael Payne

Personal details
- Born: Thomas William Randall; 4 July 1981 (age 44) Arnold, Nottinghamshire, England
- Party: Conservative
- Education: Redhill Academy
- Alma mater: University of Oxford
- Website: www.tomforgedling.com

Thomas William Randall (born 4 July 1981) is a British Conservative Party politician who was Member of Parliament (MP) for Gedling from 2019 until 2024. He was a member of the 1922 Committee.

== Early life ==
Randall was born and grew up in Arnold, Nottinghamshire, where he attended Redhill Academy. He lived on Killisick Road.

He studied law at Oxford University, going on to practise as a solicitor for two years. He worked for a professional membership body before becoming an MP. He was diagnosed with Ankylosing spondylitis at the age of 16.

== Political career ==
Randall contested the local government election in 2018 for Tower Hamlets but fell seven votes short of winning one of the two Canary Wharf seats.

Randall was selected to contest the Gedling seat by the Conservative Party for the 2019 general election. He went on to defeat the sitting Labour MP Vernon Coaker and win the seat with a majority of 1.4%, or 679 votes. This made the seat one of the most marginal in the country.

Randall was defeated by the Labour candidate Michael Payne at the 2024 general election.

== Electoral history ==
=== 2024 general election ===
General election 2024: Gedling
Party	Candidate	Votes	%	±%
Labour	Michael Payne	23,278	47.8	+5.0
Conservative	Tom Randall	11,397	23.4	−23.8
Reform	Simon Christy	8,211	16.9	+13.5
Green	Dominic Berry	3,122	6.4	+4.2
Liberal Democrats	Tad Jones	2,473	5.1	+0.6
Independent	Irenea Marriott	241	0.5	New
Majority		11,881	24.4	
Turnout		48,722	63.3	
Labour gain from Conservative		Swing		

=== 2019 general election ===
General election 2019: Gedling
Party	Candidate	Votes	%	±%
Conservative	Tom Randall	22,718	45.5	+2.6
Labour	Vernon Coaker	22,039	44.1	−7.8
Liberal Democrats	Anita Prabhakar	2,279	4.6	+2.5
Brexit Party	Graham Hunt	1,820	3.6	+3.6
Green	Jim Norris	1,097	2.2	+1.2
Majority		679	1.4	N/A
Turnout		52,164	69.9	−2.6
Conservative gain from Labour		Swing	+5.2	

=== 2018 Tower Hamlets London Borough Council elections ===
Canary Wharf (2) 2018
Party	Candidate	Votes	%	±%
Conservative	Andrew Wood	983		
Labour	Kyrsten Perry	760		
Labour	Anisur Anis	758		
Conservative	Tom Randall	754		
Aspire	Mohammed Talukdar	700		
Aspire	Helen Begum	456		
Liberal Democrats	Kevin Lyons	315		
PATH	Yusuf Ahmed	236		
Liberal Democrats	Gareth Shelton	222		
Green	Andrew Grey	215		
Independent	Natasha Bolter	141		
Green	Alasdair Blackwell	137		
Rejected ballots		12		
Turnout		3,101	33.8	
Registered electors		9,150		
Conservative hold		Swing		
Labour gain from Tower Hamlets First				

Parliament of the United Kingdom
Preceded by Vernon Coaker	Member of Parliament for Gedling; 2019–2024	Succeeded by Michael Payne
