= Henry Longhurst =

British politician and golf writer (1909–1978)

- Born: Henry Carpenter Longhurst; 18 March 1909; Bromham, Bedfordshire, U.K.
- Died: 21 July 1978 (aged 69); Cuckfield, Sussex, U.K.
- Education: Clare College, Cambridge
- Occupations: Politician, writer, golf broadcaster
- Years active: 1940s–1978

Henry Carpenter Longhurst CBE (18 March 1909 – 21 July 1978) was a British golf writer and commentator. For 45 years, he was golfing correspondent of The Sunday Times. During World War II, Longhurst was also Member of Parliament (MP) for Acton in west London. Longhurst was inducted into the World Golf Hall of Fame in 2017.

== Early life ==
In 1909, Longhurst was born at Bromham, Bedfordshire, the son of (William) Henry Longhurst, who established the firm of Longhurst & Skinner, a house-furnishing business at Bedford, and his wife Constance (née Smith).

== Education ==
Longhurst was educated at St Cyprian's School, Eastbourne, close to the Royal Eastbourne Golf Club, where he records "gazing at them – the caddies, not the golfers – with deepest envy as I peered surreptitiously up from the Greek unseen." He was "hooked for life" during a family holiday in 1920 at Yelverton in Devon, where he started playing golf on a home-made three-hole course on a common. Here Longhurst was encouraged by the local professional.

Longhurst was subsequently educated at Bedford School before winning a scholarship to Charterhouse School and in 1928 went to Clare College, Cambridge. He played for Cambridge University Golf Club from 1928 to 1931 and was captain in 1931. He was German Amateur Champion in 1936 and runner-up in the Swiss Amateur in 1928 and the French Amateur in 1937, beaten 1 hole by Jacques Léglise.

== Career ==
After starting work in the family business, he found a post selling advertising space for the Hardware Trade Journal. He had been attracted by the politics of the proprietor, Sir Ernest Benn, and had become a member of the Individualist Society, which Benn founded. Longhurst started writing for a monthly golf magazine called Tee Topics and came to the attention of the editor of The Sunday Times who invited him to contribute to the sporting page. Thus, he became the golf correspondent of The Sunday Times, and retained that position for 40 years. He was also a regular contributor to Golf Illustrated.

In 1943, Longhurst was elected at the Acton by-election as a Conservative Party MP but lost the seat at the 1945 general election. During the 1931 general election, Longhurst had spoken at a campaign meeting supporting Bedford's Conservative candidate, which he described as "a heady introduction to politics, and once you have been bitten by the bug it is almost impossible, as in golf, to throw it off."

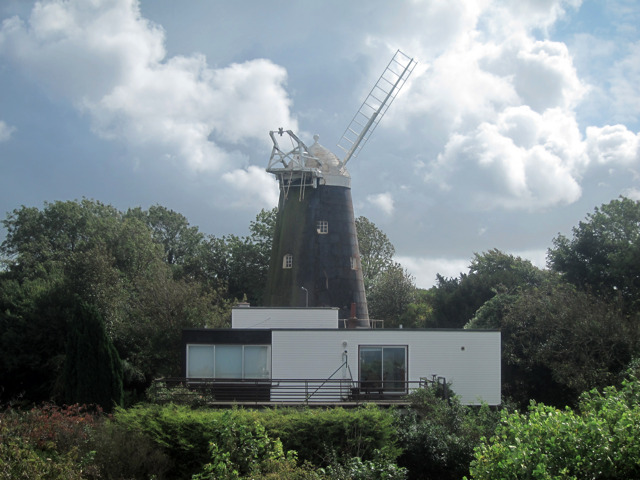
The house and 'Jack' at Clayton Windmills

During the second part of the 1940s, Longhurst visited Middle Eastern oilfields and supported the development of air travel to the Far East, representing the airline Skyways in various projects to develop services between UK and Hong Kong, Singapore and China. Later attempts were made to add services to West Africa and the Bahamas. These travels were recorded in his 1949 book You never know till you get there.

From the late 1950s to the end of his life, he was BBC Television's senior golf commentator. Longhurst featured on US Golf telecasts working for both CBS and ABC. CBS golf producer Frank Chirkinian hired Longhurst to work selected broadcasts starting with the Carling Tournament in 1965. He is best remembered by American audiences for his calls at the 16th hole of the Masters Tournament including Jack Nicklaus' 40-foot birdie putt that led to victory in 1975. Longhurst's call of the putt ("My my.... in all my life I have never seen a putt quite like that.") is a regular feature in Masters broadcasts. He had many lifelong friends including the cricket writer and commentator E. W. Swanton, and Alistair Cooke. Cooke referred to his writing as "the prose style, which was as effortless as falling out of bed."

In 1953, Longhurst acquired the Clayton Windmills ('Jack and Jill') near Brighton in Sussex. He lived for a number of years at 'Jack', first in the mill itself and then in a modern house next to it built for him in 1963 by the architect Peter Farley who also designed Brighton Marina. 'Jill' was derelict but with a grant from East Sussex County Council it was restored and opened for visitors.

In his memoirs, My Life and Soft Times, (1971), he defended St Cyprian's, the school he had arrived at in 1915, from critics like Gavin Maxwell, and George Orwell who had attacked it in his polemic Such, Such Were the Joys. Notwithstanding, Longhurst's mention of being made to eat up a bowl of porridge into which he had been sick has been described as "an own goal".

== Personal life ==
Longhurst died in Cuckfield, Sussex, in 1978, aged 69.

== Awards and honors ==
In 2017, Longhurst was inducted into the World Golf Hall of Fame.

== Bibliography ==
- Golf, J. M. Dent, 1937.
- It Was Good While It Lasted, J. M. Dent, 1941.
- I Wouldn't Have Missed It, J. M. Dent, 1945.
- You Never Know Till You Get There, J. M. Dent, 1949.
- Golf Mixture, Werner Laurie, 1952.
- Round in Sixty-Eight, Werner Laurie, 1953.
- The Borneo Story: The History of the First 100 Years of Trading in the Far East by the Borneo Company Ltd, Newman Neame, 1956.
- Adventure in Oil: The Story of British Petroleum, Sidgwick & Jackson, 1959.
- Spice of Life, Cassell, 1963.
- Only on Sundays, Cassell, 1964.
- Never on Weekdays, Cassell, 1968.
- My Life and Soft Times, Cassell 1971.

== Sources ==
- Oxford Dictionary of National Biography -E. W. Swanton, Longhurst, Henry Carpenter (1909–1978), rev., first published Sept 2004
- Mark Wilson And Ken Bowden (eds) The Best of Henry Longhurst on Golf and Life Collins 1979
- Leigh Rayment's Historical List of MPs

Parliament of the United Kingdom
Preceded by Hubert Duggan	Member of Parliament for Acton; 1943–1945	Succeeded by Joseph Sparks
