= 1968 Acton by-election =

UK parliamentary by-election

The 1968 Acton by-election of 28 March 1968 was held after the death of Labour Member of Parliament (MP) Bernard Floud on 10 October 1967. The seat, previously Labour, was gained by the Conservatives in a defeat for Harold Wilson's government. It was one of the three Conservative gains from Labour on the same day, the others being at Meriden and Dudley. The by-election also marked the first electoral appearance of the National Front, who finished fourth securing 5.5% of the vote, likely drawing upon concerns regarding the recent arrival of Kenyan Asians into Britain. A month later the British politician Enoch Powell made his Rivers of Blood speech.

== Result ==
Acton by-election, 1968
| Party | Candidate | Votes | % | ±% |
|---|---|---|---|---|
| Conservative | Kenneth Baker | 12,242 | 48.67 | +6.36 |
| Labour | Walter Johnson | 8,522 | 33.88 | −23.81 |
| Liberal | Frank Davis | 2,868 | 11.40 | New |
| National Front | Andrew Fountaine | 1,400 | 5.57 | New |
| Independent | Harold Fox | 75 | 0.30 | New |
| Independent | William Gold | 44 | 0.17 | New |
| Majority | | 3,720 | 14.79 | N/A |
| Turnout | | 25,151 | 59.7 | −14.2 |
| Conservative gain from Labour | | Swing | +15.9 | |
