= Philip Holland (politician) =

British politician

Sir Philip Welsby Holland (14 March 1917 – 2 June 2011) was a British Conservative Party politician.

Born in Northwich, Holland was educated at Sir John Deane's Grammar School, Northwich. He served with the Royal Air Force from 1936 to 1946 and was in the Middle East from 1938 to 1942. He was the personnel manager of an electronics company and served as a councillor on Kensington Borough Council from 1955 to 1959.

Holland was an unsuccessful candidate at the 1955 general election in the Birmingham Yardley constituency. At the next general election, in 1959, he was elected to the House of Commons as Member of Parliament (MP) for the marginal constituency of Acton in west London, narrowly defeating the sitting Labour MP Joseph Sparks. He lost the seat to Bernard Floud at the 1964 election.

He stood at the 1966 general election in the safe Conservative seat of Carlton in Nottinghamshire, where he was re-elected until the constituency's abolition for the 1983 general election. He was then returned for the new Gedling constituency, and retired at the 1987 election after 26 years in Parliament. He remained a back-bencher and was best known for his opposition to quangos, campaigning persistently for their reduction.

== Sources ==
- The Times Guide to the House of Commons, Times Newspapers Ltd, 1955, 1966 & 1983
- Leigh Rayment's Historical List of MPs
- Obituary of Sir Philip Holland, The Daily Telegraph, 6 June 2011

Parliament of the United Kingdom
Preceded by Joseph Sparks	Member of Parliament for Acton; 1959–1964	Succeeded by Bernard Floud
Preceded by Kenneth Pickthorn	Member of Parliament for Carlton; 1966–1983	Constituency abolished
New constituency	Member of Parliament for Gedling; 1983–1987	Succeeded by Andrew Mitchell
