= Gordon Beckles =

British journalist (1902–1954)

Gordon Dudley Beckles Willson (9 April 1902 – 4 August 1954) was a British journalist who wrote under the name Gordon Beckles.

== Family background ==
Gordon Dudley Beckles Willson was born on 9 April 1902 in Paddington, London. He was the eldest son of Henry Beckles Willson (1869–1942) (known as Beckles Willson), a journalist and author, who had married Ethel Grace Dudley (1873–1920) in Ontario in 1899. The couple had two other children, Clare (1906–1981) and Robert (1908–1972). All three followed in their father's footsteps and took up journalism. Beckles Willson and his wife had moved from Canada to Talbot Road, Paddington, in the 1890s. For a while during 1911 the family lived at Quebec House in Westerham, Kent, once the childhood home of James Wolfe. Grace died in Westerham in 1920 and Beckles died in Beaulieu-sur-mer, France in September 1942.

Gordon Beckles served in the First World War as an (acting) Major attached to the HQ staff, before being and invalided out in 1916. He became a prolific author, mainly of historical and political works.

He married Patricia Donnelly in 1927, they lived at 7 Gower Street WC1. The same year he became assistant editor of the Sunday Dispatch, and a colour portrait by Lewis Baumer of Patricia appeared in Tatler magazine in the November. They had three children Anthony (known as Tony) born in 1928, and twins Jennifer (known as Patsy) and Janet in 1932. Their mother Patricia died in the autumn of 1934. In 1939 Gordon remarried a French divorcee Hélène Juliette Nelly Freer-Ash (née Planckaert) in Westminster.

He lived in London, variously in Gower Street, Holborn, Portman Mansions, Baker Street and finally Chesterfield House, Mayfair. His daughters Janet and Jennifer became one pair of the "Toni Twins" who advertised hair products in the 1950s. Janet led a socialite lifestyle, and counted among her friends politicians, and actors such as Nigel Davenport. In 1954 she married a businessman, William Ingram, who died in the 1970s. She retired to the Wiltshire village of Marlborough and died in 2011. The other twin Patsy married John Alliott in 1957. They lived in London before moving to Berkshire. His son Tony married Robina Elizabeth Ballard in 1954 who became a successful novelist, publishing under her married name books such as Leopards on the Loire (1961) and A Reflection of Rachel (1967). She was also a prolific children's author. They lived in Twickenham.

Gordon collapsed on his way home and died in St Mary's Hospital in Paddington, London, on 4 August 1954, aged 52. His second wife, Helene, died in March 1959 at the Churchill Clinic, London.

== Journalistic career ==
He wrote under the name Gordon Beckles, a journalist with the Daily Express and at 25 became an assistant editor of the Sunday Dispatch.

He was a columnist with the Daily Herald, a left-wing, British daily that sold up to two million copies a day at its peak, later became The Sun. He became deputy editor of the Daily Mail, in 1928 travelled to the US on their behalf. He penned a serial story "Hollywood-on-Thames" for the Daily Herald in the early 1930s. He acted as art editor, authored many books. He was occasional contributor to the Illustrated London News.

During the war he collaborated on a film with J. Lee Thompson.

In the late 1940s and 1950s, he wrote for The Sphere and Leader Magazine, a weekly pictorial magazine published by the Hulton Press, until it closed in 1950. He also wrote for Lilliput and had regular columns for Tatler magazine under the titles: "Some Portraits in Print" and "Talk of the Town" covering society gossip and the Royal Family.

== Published books ==
- Tankard travels (1936) Tales told of Taverns, Chapman & Hall London
- Birth of a Spitfire (1941) The Story of Beaverbrook's Ministry and its First £10,000,000, illus. by David Low, Collins, London
- Coronation souvenir book (1937) Daily Express Publications (the story in words and pictures of two Royal brothers: Edward VIII and George VI and the turbulent 18 months surrounding the abdication and crowning)
- Dunkirk and After, May 10 June 17, 1940 (1940) The Campaign and Evacuation of Flanders, Hutchinson, London
- Canada comes to England (1941) Hodder & Stoughton, London
- America chooses! (1941) in the words of President Roosevelt (June 1940–June 1941) George G. Harrap, London
- Tanks Advance (1942) All About the Modern Tank, Profusely Illustrated, Cassell and Co., London
- Queen Mary – A Picture Pageant of Her Wonderful Years (1950) (Introduction), Daily Express Publications, London
- King George VI: A pictorial record of his great life (1952) Daily Express Publications, London
- Coronation Glory; a pageant of queens, 1559–1953 (1953) illus. John Musgrave Wood; London Express Publications
- The Bridport Story: A record of 700 years, 1253–1953 (1953) Alfred Pemberton Limited, London

== Selected articles ==
- (1929) "Wagner is the Puccini of Music," Daily Express, 5 March
- (1932) "Their God is the Plan," Daily Herald, 4 July, p. 8 — a critique of the film (Battleship Potemkin); later criticized at the August 1934 First Congress of Soviet Writers
- (1932) "Empress of Britain (Canadian Pacific), Dockside Drama of a £3m liner"
- (1933) "Adolf Hitler: The Clown Who Wants to Play Statesman," Daily Herald, January 31 — the article was syndicated in Australia same year.
- (1933) "Arnold Schoenberg's Musical 'Strafe' To-night: How 100 British Bandsmen will Rend the Air," Daily Herald, 8 February
- (1934) "The BBC Out Ogpus the Ogpu," Daily Express, 23 February 1934 — the OGPU were Stalin's secret police and forerunners of the KGB
- (1938) "A Reflection on Daily Mail and Punch cartoonist Leslie Gilbert Illingworth meeting with Gordon Beckles," by Political Cartoon Society, Dr. Tim Benson
- (1941) "Brains in the Ballot Box," World Review (Nov. 1941): 23-26 — suggests qualifications for voters
- (1947) "Housewife of England, the life of Dorothy Crisp," Leader Magazine, 12 July

== Film work ==
Beckles collaborated with J. Lee Thompson and Lesley Storm on the screenplay of East of Piccadilly (1941) a mystery film (1h 15m) starring Judy Campbell and Sebastian Shaw, based on his original story.

Synopsis: Pennie Sutton (Judy Campbell), a crime reporter, and Tamsie Green (Sabastian Shaw), pulp writer, are first on the scene of one in a series of murders. Together they set out to unravel the mystery. The story may have been influenced by his writings 'Hollywood on Thames' in the early 1930s.

== Sources ==
- Knox, Collie, (1938) It Might Have Been You, Chapman & Hall London
- Doctor, Jennifer, (1999) The BBC and Ultra-Modern Music, 1922-1936: Shaping a Nation's Tastes, Cambridge University Press
- Hutchings, Stephen, (Ed.) (2008) Russia and its Other(s) on Film: Screening Intercultural Dialogue, Palgrave Macmillan
- Steiner, Zara, (2011) The Triumph of the Dark: European International History 1933-1939, Oxford University Press
- Kotkin, Stephen, (2017) Stalin, Vol. II: Waiting for Hitler: 1929–1941, Penguin, London
- Brooks, Colin, (Ed.) (1998) Fleet Street, Press Barons and Politics: The Journals of Collin Brooks: 1932-1940, Royal Historical Society, London
- Goble, Alan (Ed.) (1999) The Complete Index to Literary Sources in Film, Bowker-Sour, East Grinstead, Sussex
- Berlin, Isaiah, (2009) Enlightening: Letters 1946 – 1960, Chatto & Windus
- Carty, T.J., (Ed.), (2015) A Dictionary of Literary Pseudonyms in the English Language, Routledge
- Daily and Sunday Express Parliamentary Archives: Catalogue Reference: GB-061, BBK/H/75 Date: 1930 Level: File Category: Personal/Political Papers Description: Correspondents include: H.V.Morton Henry Vollam Morton, Basil Murray, H.R.S.Phillpott, R.Pound, A.J.Russell, Hannen Swaffer, Sidney Strube, Michael Wardell, Gordon Beckles Willson and others.
- The British Newspaper Archive
