= Hubert Duggan =

Argentine-born British politician (1904–1943)

Hubert John Duggan (24 July 1904 – 25 October 1943) was an Argentine-born British Army officer and politician, who was Conservative Party Member of Parliament for Acton from 1931 until his death. He was an opponent of appeasement and broke the whip on several important occasions, voting to bring down Neville Chamberlain in 1940.

A witty and handsome man who very much enjoyed the company of women, Duggan was married only briefly before becoming the plaintiff in a scandalous divorce case. He suffered from ill health; brought up in the Catholic faith, he lapsed in adolescence but returned when on his deathbed. Episodes in his life inspired writers Evelyn Waugh and Anthony Powell to fictionalise him.

== Family ==
Duggan was born in Buenos Aires, Argentina, where his father's family had many "estancias", and was also honorary Attaché to the Argentine Legation in London. At an early age the family returned to England, where Duggan and his elder brother Alfred Duggan, the historical novelist, were brought up. Alfred Duggan (senior) was a Roman Catholic and his sons were brought up in that faith, but he died "of drink" in 1915 when Duggan was 11.

His immensely rich American mother Grace married leading statesman Lord Curzon in January 1917. Duggan was therefore well-connected with the Conservative Party from an early age. As neither his stepfather nor his mother was Catholic, his faith gradually lapsed.

Duggan regarded his stepfather positively and countered suggestions that the humourless image he projected to the public was accurate in private. In later years, he angrily denounced W. Somerset Maugham's comedy Our Betters which gently satirised Americans marrying into aristocratic British families.

== Eton ==
Duggan was sent first to Wixenford, a fashionable prep school, and then to Eton College, where he was placed in Goodhart's House of which he became captain. His near-contemporary Anthony Powell described him at Eton as reading a great deal despite being "never in the least .. part of the Eton .. intellectual world". Powell identified Duggan as being witty, something of a show-off, but with a strong vein of melancholy, and a stylish rider in point to point racing. Evelyn Waugh thought of Duggan as handsome and amusing, but melancholy.

Duggan did not complete his studies at Eton owing to ill health. At the age of 18 he underwent an operation for appendicitis and went to Argentina to convalesce. When he had recovered, Duggan went up to Christ Church, Oxford in summer term of 1923. He immediately took an intense dislike to life at Oxford, falling into depression and wistfully speaking of the girls of Argentina. Anthony Powell, who was then at Balliol College, reported once seeing Lord Curzon (then Chancellor of the University) talking to Duggan who had not yet got out of bed.

== Army life ==
After only one term, Duggan left Oxford, apparently due to the lack of female company there. Early in 1924, he was commissioned into the Life Guards. On 20 December of that year he was promoted to be Second Lieutenant, Supplementary List on probation, and the appointment was confirmed on 14 November 1925. On 30 January 1927 he was moved to the regular Army.

== Political career ==
He had served only four years before he resigned his commission on being selected as prospective Conservative Party candidate for East Ham South in 1928. In the same year he married Joan Dunn, the second daughter of Sir James Hamet Dunn. Duggan spent more than a year "nursing" his prospective constituency, which was narrowly held by the Labour Party; in the 1929 general election he argued that the Ford factory would only be built locally if "safeguarding" of industries was continued. He lost the election as the Labour majority increased to 10,102 votes.

== Divorce case and love life ==
On 1 November 1929 Duggan was granted a divorce on grounds of his wife's adultery with Anthony Jenkinson. The President of the Probate, Divorce and Admiralty Division stated that petitioner Duggan was absent from home because of his position as a Parliamentary candidate, and criticised the "social crimes" of Jenkinson in insinuating himself into Mrs Duggan's life. Duggan was granted custody of a child born to his wife on 5 August 1929. (Jenkinson, who subsequently married Duggan's ex-wife, committed suicide in October 1935.)

Duggan had many affairs, both before and after his marriage. Among those was with Lady Mary (Maimie) Lygon (third daughter of the 7th Earl Beauchamp), Lady Bridget Parsons (daughter of the 5th Earl of Rosse), Diana Fellowes, and Daphne Weymouth.

== Election for Acton ==
Meanwhile, Duggan decided not to fight East Ham again, He was adopted for Acton in 1930, a seat which Labour held by 467 votes. At the 1931 general election, he gained the seat by a majority of 12,272. He was swiftly appointed as Parliamentary Private Secretary to Euan Wallace, Civil Lord of the Admiralty.

== Parliamentary activity ==
In April 1932, Duggan made a speech supporting the government's Sunday Performances (Regulation) Bill, which sought to allow cinemas to open on a Sunday. He argued that prohibiting Sunday opening would be "a breach of the principle of religious tolerance". However, Duggan did not prove to be a particularly active Member of Parliament, and spoke only very rarely. His majority was more than halved to 5,578 at the 1935 general election.

He began the new Parliament by joining with other Conservative members to put down a motion opposing "the transfer into any other hands of British Colonies or British Mandated Territories". In March 1936 he argued that the Derating Act, which removed local taxation from industries and had been brought in to tackle the depression, was acting to move industry to the South of England and should be withdrawn in order to keep industry in the North of England.

== Opposition to appeasement ==
Duggan seconded an amendment moved by Alan Lennox-Boyd to a Labour Party motion on food storage in wartime in February 1938, during which he argued that Britain had "no such menace as that of the German Fleet in 1914, and there was no submarine menace comparable to that of 1914". However, he was allied with Winston Churchill on the threat in Europe, and abstained rather than support the Government in a vote of censure over the resignation of Anthony Eden later that month.

In the spring of 1938 Duggan was a member of an informal group of young Conservative back-benchers who called themselves "The Group" and met to discuss foreign affairs; the Conservative whips derided them as "the Glamour Boys". When the Munich Agreement was put to the vote in October 1938, Duggan also abstained. With the broad group of anti-appeasement Members, he signed a motion calling for a National Government on the "widest possible basis" in March 1939.

== Second World War ==
On the outbreak of the Second World War, Duggan rejoined the Life Guards as a lieutenant, apparently in spite of medical advice. Wearing his military uniform, he voted against Neville Chamberlain in the Norway Debate in May 1940, thereby contributing to his fall. Later that year he ceased to serve on active duty. His health declined but he insisted that he would not be invalided out of the Army.

== Illness ==
From the late 1930s, Duggan was living with his mistress, Phyllis de Janzé, in a small house in Chapel Street, Belgravia. He was much affected by de Janzé's death in April 1943. That July, Duggan fell gravely ill with tuberculosis, and was confined to hospital where he was operated on. However, Duggan did not improve, and on 14 September he was removed from the Reserve of Officers and granted the honorary rank of captain.

== Death and literary model ==
While on his deathbed, Duggan was visited by his friend Evelyn Waugh (Duggan was god-father to Waugh's daughter Margaret). On 12 October Duggan told Waugh that he was thinking of returning to the Catholic faith from which had been estranged since his youth, but was reluctant to repent of his life with Phyllis de Janzé because it would be to betray her.

The next day Waugh brought a priest, Father Devas of Farm Street Chapel, to see Duggan. Duggan's sister Marcella Rice did not want the priest to go in to see him, but Waugh insisted and Duggan was given absolution, replying "Thank you, Father". Later that day Waugh and Devas returned with the offer to anoint Duggan; Duggan was reluctant but eventually crossed himself to indicate his acceptance and after receiving the ceremony told Waugh "When I became a Catholic it was not through fear". Waugh later transposed this scene into his novel Brideshead Revisited.

Duggan's "demeanour at school–though not in later life" was the model for Charles Stringham in Anthony Powell's series of novels "A Dance to the Music of Time".

Parliament of the United Kingdom
Preceded by James Shillaker	Member of Parliament for Acton; 1931 – 1943	Succeeded by Henry Longhurst
