= 1943 Acton by-election =

UK by-election

The 1943 Acton by-election was a by-election held on 14 December 1943 for the British House of Commons constituency of Acton in London.

== Background ==
The seat had become vacant after the death in October of the Conservative Member of Parliament (MP) Hubert Duggan. He had first been elected at the 1931 general election.

During World War II, the major parties had agreed an electoral pact under which they would not contest by-elections in seats held by their respective parties, and as a result many wartime by-elections resulting in a candidate being returned unopposed. However, other parties and independent politicians were free to field candidates.

The by-election was held on an electoral roll which had not been updated since 1937.

== Candidates ==
As of 19 November 1943, there were as many as seven candidates. Following the withdrawal of three candidates, the remaining candidates Walter Padley for the Independent Labour Party (ILP); Edward Godfrey who sought election as an 'English Nationalist'; Independent Dorothy Crisp who wrote for the Sunday Dispatch; and the official Conservative candidate Henry Longhurst.

During the war Walter Padley had been a conscientious objector. In 1950 he was elected Labour Party MP for Ogmore and served until 1979.

Godfrey was founder of the English National Association, an organisation with alleged Fascist leanings.

== Result ==
The Conservative candidate, Henry Longhurst, was elected with a majority of 3,301 more votes than all his opponents combined.

Acton by-election, 1943
Party	Candidate	Votes	%	±%
Conservative	Henry Longhurst	5,014	60.3	+1.8
Ind. Labour Party	Walter Padley	2,336	28.1	New
Independent	Dorothy Crisp	707	8.5	New
Independent	Edward Godfrey	258	3.1	New
Majority		2,678	32.2	+15.1
Turnout		8,315	17.1	−50.7
Conservative hold		Swing	+7.6	

== See also ==
- List of United Kingdom by-elections
