= James Shillaker =

James Frederick Shillaker (28 January 1870 – 20 July 1943) was a British Labour politician.

He was born in the City of London, and was the son of a police sergeant. He was educated at Taplow Grammar School and the City of London College, benefiting from an educational foundation established in the 17th century for children of the parish of St Sepulchre-without-Newgate.

In 1890 he was one of the founding members of the Fawcett Association, a trade union of post office sorters, and in 1892 he joined the Labour Party in Islington. He was subsequently to become one of the first councillors for the party on Acton Urban District Council.

He moved from the post office to the Ministry of Pensions, where he was deputy regional director of the northern region from 1919 - 1923. He also edited a "lonely hearts" column entitled Friends in Council in T. P.'s Weekly for fourteen years.

In 1929 he was chosen by the Labour Party to contest the parliamentary seat of Acton. He was successful in a three-cornered contest, unseating the sitting Conservative Member of Parliament, Sir Harry Brittain by 467 votes.

Two years later there was a further general election. This time it was a straight fight between Shillaker and his Conservative opponent H J Duggan. There was a large swing against Labour, and Duggan won the seat by a convincing majority of 12,272 votes.

Shillaker did not stand for election again. In July 1943 he died suddenly at the House of Commons while visiting Labour MP Frederick Pethick-Lawrence.

== Personal life ==
In 1891 he married Carrie Heaton, and they had one son.

Parliament of the United Kingdom
Preceded by Sir Harry Brittain	Member of Parliament for Acton; 1929 – 1931	Succeeded by Hubert Duggan
