= Joseph Sparks =

British trade unionist (1901–1981)

Joseph A. Sparks (30 September 1901 – 12 January 1981) was a British trade unionist and Labour Party politician.

== Early life ==
Born in Tiverton, Devon, he was the son of Samuel Sparks. Following education at Uffculme School and the Central Labour College in London, he entered employment with the Great Western Railway as a clerk.

== Political activity ==
He quickly became involved in the Labour movement, serving as election agent for the party at Barnstaple in 1923 and at Taunton in 1924. He subsequently moved to London where he was secretary of the South Kensington Labour Party. He entered local politics at Acton, Middlesex, and was a member of both Acton Borough Council and Middlesex County Council. He was mayor of Acton in 1957–58. He was also President of the London Region of the National Union of Railwaymen for ten years.

== Parliamentary career ==
He made three unsuccessful attempts to enter the Commons, standing at Taunton in 1929, Chelmsford in 1931 and Buckingham in 1935.

In 1945, he was chosen to contest the parliamentary constituency of Acton. There was a landslide in favour of Labour, and he was able to win the seat, overturning a large Conservative majority. Sparks held the seat until the 1959 Conservative landslide, when it was gained by Philip Holland.

== Family and death ==
He married Dora Brent in 1928, and he had 2 sons. He died in the London Borough of Brent in January 1981, aged 79.

Parliament of the United Kingdom
Preceded by Henry Carpenter Longhurst	Member of Parliament for Acton; 1945–1959	Succeeded by Philip Holland
