= Henry Beckles Willson =

Canadian journalist, soldier, historian and author

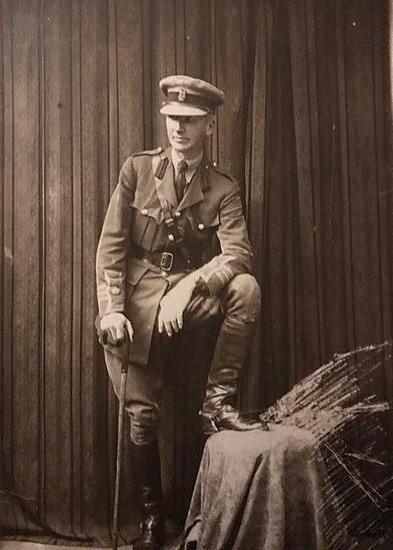
Henry Beckles Willson

Henry Beckles Willson, known as Beckles Willson, (26 August 1869 – 18 September 1942) was a Canadian journalist, First World War soldier, historian and prolific author.

== Family and career ==
Henry Beckles Willson was born in Montreal on 26 August 1869. He was educated in Kingston, Ontario. He joined the staff of the Boston Globe in 1887 and was its correspondent in Cuba during the following year. He became the correspondent in Atlanta, Georgia for the New York Herald in 1889.

He travelled to England in 1892, and joined the staff of the London Daily Mail. In 1898, the newspaper's proprietor, Alfred Harmsworth, later Viscount Northcliffe, launched the popular Harmsworth Magazine (afterwards retitled The London Magazine), with Willson as editor. The magazine survived until 1915.

During the First World War, Willson served as a senior officer with the Canadian Expeditionary Force. He recounted his experiences in the Battle of Ypres in two books: In the Ypres Salient (1916) and Ypres, the holy ground of British arms (1920). He served as an (acting) Major attached to the HQ staff before being invalided out in 1916. He then served as Inspector of War Trophies on the Western Front and later in Palestine, in which role he was instrumental in the establishment of the Imperial War Museum: he believed that the museum's collections should reflect the detail of battle and involvement of ordinary soldiers at ground level. In early 1919 he was appointed Town Major (senior British officer) in Ypres as the city began to return to civilian life. He repeatedly argued that the city should be left in ruins as a shrine to the war dead, but his high-handed actions towards this end, sometimes taken without official authority, eventually earned him a formal reprimand. In November he was discharged from the army and returned, temporarily, to Canada.

He subsequently became a prolific freelance author, mainly of historical and political works. Several of his books explored Canadian history and issues.

== Personal life and death ==
Willson married Ethel Grace Dudley on 28 June 1899 in Canada. They returned to England, and settled in London at Talbot Road, Paddington. They had two sons, Gordon Beckles (b.1902) and Robert (b.1908); and one daughter, Clare (b.1906). All three became journalists. The family lived for a while at Quebec House, Westerham, Kent, the childhood home of James Wolfe (1727–1759).

Grace died at Quebec House in 1920. Willson re-married the French-born Ida Lavinia Parkes in Chelsea in the spring of 1924.

During the Second World War he was interned in France. He died in Beaulieu-sur-Mer on 18 September 1942 with the rank of Lieutenant Colonel, aged 73. Ida died in March 1965.

== Selected works ==
- Harold: an experiment (1891)
- Drift (1895). Verse, 85 pages
- Tenth Island: being some account of Newfoundland, its people, its politics, its problems, and its peculiarities; with an introduction by the Rt. Hon. Sir William Whiteway ... and some remarks on Newfoundland and the navy (1897)
- The Great Company, 1667–1871: being a history of the honourable company of merchants-adventurers trading into Hudson's Bay; with an introduction by Lord Strathcona and Mount Royal with original drawings by Arthur Heming (1899)
- Lord Strathcona: the story of his life; with forewords by the Duke of Argyll and the Earl of Aberdeen. With 8 illustrations (1902)
  - The Life of Lord Strathconan and Mount Royal, G.C.M.G., G.C.V.O.
- Lost England; the story of our submerged coasts (1902)
- The New America: a study of the imperial republic (1903)
- Ledger and Sword (1903)
- Story of Rapid Transit; with thirty-seven illustrations (1903)
- Nattevandring (1905)
- Canada; with twelve reproductions from original coloured drawings by Henry Sandham (1907). A book for young people
- George III, as man, monarch and statesman (1907)
- Occultism and Common-sense; with an introduction by Prof. W. F. Barrett (1908)
- Life and Letters of James Wolfe (1909)
- Nova Scotia: the province that has been passed by (1911)
- Quebec, the Laurentian province (1913)
- Aglaia of Melos (1914). Verse
- In the Ypres Salient: the story of a fortnight's Canadian fighting, June 2–16, 1916 (1916) Simpkin, Marshall, Hamilton, Kent & Co. London (re-published in 2016)
- Ypres, the holy ground of British arms (1920)
- Redemption: a novel (1924). 399 pages
- Paris Embassy: a narrative of Franco-British diplomatic relations 1814-1920 (1927). 368 pages
  - Ambassade d'Angleterre à Paris (1814-1920): un siècle de relations diplomatiques franco-britanniques (1929)
- America's Ambassadors to France (1777–1927): a narrative of Franco-American diplomatic relations (1928)
- America's Ambassadors to England (1785–1928): a narrative of Anglo-American diplomatic relations (1928)
  - America's Ambassadors to England (1785–1929): a narrative of Anglo-American diplomatic relations (1929)
- From Quebec to Piccadilly and other places, some Anglo-Canadian memories (1929)
- If I had Fifty Millions! (1931)
- John Slidell and the Confederates in Paris (1862–65) (1932)
- Friendly Relations: a narrative of Britain's ministers and ambassadors to America (1791–1930) (1934)
