= Robert Harvey (businessman) =

British saltpetre producer (1847–1930)

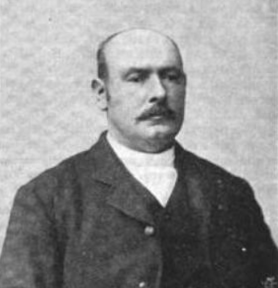
- In The Sketch, 13 May 1896
- Born: 2 October 1847; Truro, Cornwall, England
- Died: 14 March 1930 (aged 82); Falmouth, Cornwall, England
- Occupation: Industrialist
- Spouse: Alida María Godefroy

Sir Robert Harvey JP DL (2 October 1847 – 14 March 1930) was a prominent British saltpetre producer in Bolivia, Peru and Chile during the late 19th century.

== Biography ==
Harvey was born in Truro, Cornwall to Samuel Harvey, a tailor. The young Harvey was apprenticed to William's engineering works at Truro. In 1872 he went to Bolivia to work in the Tocopilla Copper Mines and in 1875, moved to Iquique, which was then in Peru, and became involved in the production of saltpetre.

During the War of the Pacific, Harvey was captured at the Battle of San Francisco. Due to his expertise in the nitrate industry, he was recruited to work for the Chilean government. About this time he married Alida María Godefroy who was from a respected Franco-Peruvian family. In 1881, when the Chilean government privatized the nitrate industry, Harvey became managing partner for the firm of J. T. North and Harvey, which he had established with John Thomas North, who was often called the Nitrate King.

By 1883, Harvey had made enough money he decided it was time to return to Britain where he became a landowner in Cornwall and Devon. He bought the Trenoweth estate, near Grampound Road and many properties in the Totnes area including Dundridge House in the parish of Harberton.

In 1897, he was High Sheriff of Devon and in 1900 Sheriff of Cornwall, and he made an unsuccessful run to become MP for Truro. He was among the new knights announced in the 1901 New Year Honours list, and was knighted by King Edward VII at Marlborough House on 9 February 1901.

He had one daughter, Dame Alida Brittain, and five sons, including politician Sir Samuel Emile Harvey.

Robert Harvey died in Falmouth on 14 March 1930.
