= Francis Floud =

British civil servant and diplomat (1875–1965)

Sir Francis Lewis Castle Floud KCB KCSI KCMG (18 May 1875 – 17 April 1965) was a British civil servant and diplomat. Very unusually, he received three knighthoods for his public services.

== Early life ==
Floud came from a clerical family. He was educated at Cranleigh School and King's College London, having refused to go to Oxford University because he did not wish to enter the church; his younger brother went in his stead. He entered the Board of Agriculture at a junior level in 1894 and, while working there, qualified as a barrister of Lincoln's Inn.

== Service life ==
He served in a variety of posts before being appointed, in 1920, the permanent secretary of the Ministry of Agriculture and Fisheries. He was chairman of the board of customs and excise from 1927 to 1930 and then permanent secretary of the Ministry of Labour (1930-1934) during the very difficult period following the financial crisis, when unemployment and other benefits were cut by the National government. He served as British high commissioner to Canada from 1934 to 1938. and was invested as a Knight Commander of the Order of St Michael and St George (KCMG) in the 1938 New Year Honours.

== Floud Commission ==
From 1938 to 1940 he chaired the Bengal Land Revenue Commission, for which he was appointed a Knight Commander to the Order of the Star of India (KCSI) in the 1941 New Year Honours and, in his retirement, a number of other public bodies.

== Family ==
Francis Floud married, in 1909, Phyllis, daughter of Colonel Everard A. Ford. They had two sons, Peter Floud and Bernard Floud MP and a daughter Phyllis, who married Peter du Sautoy.

Government offices
Preceded by Sir Alfred Daniel Hall as Secretary, Board of Agriculture and Fisheries	Permanent Secretary of the Ministry of Agriculture and Fisheries; 1920–1927	Succeeded by Sir Charles John Howell Thomas
Preceded by Sir Horace Hamilton	Chairman of the Board of Customs and Excise; 1927–1930	Succeeded by Sir James Grigg
Preceded by Sir Horace Wilson	Permanent Secretary of the Ministry of Labour; 1930–1934	Succeeded by Sir Thomas Williams Phillips
Diplomatic posts
Preceded by Sir William Clark	British High Commissioner to Canada; 1934–1938	Succeeded by Sir Gerald Campbell
