= Elizabeth Mary Aslin =

English art historian and administrator

Elizabeth Aslin
- Born: Elizabeth Mary Aslin; 23 March 1923; Sheffield, West Riding of Yorkshire, England
- Died: 14 April 1989 (aged 66); Brighton, Sussex, England
- Education: Slade School of Fine Art; University of London
- Occupations: Art historian; Administrator; Author; Lecturer
- Years active: 1947–1981

Elizabeth Mary Aslin (23 March 1923 – 14 April 1989) was an English art historian, administrator, author and lecturer who was a specialist in 19th and 20th century decorative arts. She was a research assistant in the Circulation Department of the Victoria and Albert Museum (V&A) between 1947 and 1964, before becoming a part-time assistant keeper in charge of Bethnal Green Museum from 1964 to 1968. Aslin returned to the V&A as assistant director to John Pope-Hennessy between 1968 and 1974 and she was later appointed Bethnal Green Museum's Keeper in Charge from 1974 to 1981. She was the author of some books on 19th and 20th century decorative arts.

== Early life ==
On 23 March 1923, Aslin was born at 33 Collegiate Crescent, Broomhall, Sheffield to the architect Charles Herbert Aslin and his wife Ethel Fawcett, the domestic science teacher. Aslin admired the works of her father throughout her life. Aslin was educated at the Slade School of Fine Art and later enrolled at the University of London. She did her wartime service in the Auxiliary Territorial Service and worked to interpret photographs for the intelligence services.

== Career ==
In 1947, Aslin joined the Victoria and Albert Museum (V&A) as a research assistant in its circulation department. She was a member of a group that featured Peter Floud and she planned exhibitions that were in museums across the United Kingdom. Aslin was responsible for the furniture of the seminal exhibition "Victorian and Edwardian Exhibition" in 1952. Ten years later, she authored Nineteenth Century English Furniture, which was the first major study of Victorian furniture.

Aslin joined the Bethnal Green Museum as a part-time assistant keeper in charge in 1964. She immediately began to redisplay the museum's continental furniture and undertook a preparation of British design in the 20th century for designs in the 1920s and 1930s, incorporating displays popular with the local community. In 1968, Aslin was appointed assistant director to John Pope-Hennessy at the V&A. She was given the responsibility of liaising with the Ministry of Works and was responsible for the buildings, installations and redecorating. The following year, Aslin wrote The Aesthetic Movement: Prelude to Art Nouveau.

Following the appointment of Roy Strong as director of the V&A in 1974, she returned to Bethnal Green Museum and was made Keeper in Charge until her retirement in 1981. After she retired, she dedicated herself to her interests as a life-long member of The Victorian Society. Aslin was a founder member of the Decorative Arts Society, and was a member of both the Charles Rennie Mackintosh Society and the Victorian Arts Society. She was a committee member of the Brighton Society in Hove. Aslin researched 19th-century continental ceramics and the designs of Edward William Godwin, and she published E.W. Godwin: Furniture and Interior Decoration in 1986. Aslin lectured in Britain and the United States on multiple topics and collectors, dealers and scholars around the world asked for her opinion.

== Personal life ==
Aslin did not marry. On 14 April 1989, she died at 52 Dyke Road Avenue in Brighton.
