= Dorothy Crisp =

British political figure and writer (1906–1987)

Dorothy Crisp (1906–1987) was a right-wing English political figure, writer and publisher.

== Biography ==
Dorothy Crisp was born in Leeds, England on 17 May 1906. She was the only daughter of Albert Edward Crisp, an examiner, and Annie Beckwith. She was baptized at the Anglican St Saviour Church, Richmond Hill, Leeds in June the same year.

She became a public speaker, political commentator and writer on nationalism, contributing to the National Review in the 1920s. Among her books were The Rebirth of Conservatism (1931) and Christ is no Pacifist: the Religious and Secular Case against Pacifism (1939). She was also a regular contributor of provocative articles for the Sunday Dispatch. One edition in 1943 was banned in Ireland because of her criticism of the de Valera government.

By the mid-1940s she was becoming more directly involved in politics. She stood in the 1943 Acton by-election as an Independent but secured only 707 out of the 8,315 votes cast. Despite this poor showing, she became famous as the belligerent and outspoken champion of the right-wing British Housewives' League. She was cheered for threatening to throw Aneurin Bevan (then Minister of Health in the Attlee Labour government) over Westminster Bridge if he brought in the National Health Service Act. The heated atmosphere of the League's meetings, however, frequently led to boos, catcalls and scuffles for control of the microphone. The police were summoned twice to maintain order at an uproarious meeting in which she expelled several executive members amid shouted accusations of "dictatorship". Nevertheless, she remained chairman until 1948; after which the League went into decline.

In the spring of 1945, she married John Noel Becker in Westminster, London, although she chose to keep her maiden name. They moved to the village of Smarden, near Ashford in Kent. There, she gave birth to a daughter in the summer of 1946. They named her Elizabeth, and the Conservative MP Ida Copeland stood as her godmother.

Her views divided public opinion. Some praised her good sense ("Privately, the Englishman will agree with everything she writes," said one reviewer in The Belfast Telegraph.) Others attacked her – "the buxom, brown-eyed, voluble little woman", as Gordon Beckles described her in the 12 July 1947 issue of Leader Magazine. Some attacks went too far and in 1947 she sued the New Statesman for libel. The court found in her favour and she was awarded substantial damages. The following year she launched a similar claim against the Daily Herald.

She was forced to abandon the libel suit when her husband died suddenly. He was a senior assistant at Watts & Co in Singapore and a part-time special constable. While helping the police to arrest an intruder in his office on Robinson Road, he was shot dead. Because he was off-duty at the time, the government denied her a widow's pension. She spent the next three years fighting her case before she was finally awarded an annual pension of £500. By this time, however, her publishing company had folded and she was declared bankrupt. She moved to Sussex, living variously at Overs Farmhouse, Barcombe; Jigg's Cottage, Jevington; and Woodland Drive in Hove. During this period (the 1950s and 1960s) she was convicted three times of obtaining credit while an un-discharged bankrupt – a criminal offence under the Bankruptcy Act – and served three terms in Holloway Prison. Her experiences in prison led her to write a memoir entitled A Light in the Night (1960). By describing the conditions inside Britain's jails, she hoped to draw attention to the cause of prison reform.

Around 1975 she moved to Oxford – possibly living with her daughter Elizabeth – and faded from public view. She died in Fulham in May 1987, aged 81. She was later described as the historical figure who most resembles Margaret Thatcher.

== Books by Dorothy Crisp (as author) ==
The Rebirth of Conservatism (1931, Methuen) - with five essays from the universities, an introduction by John Buchan and a conclusion by Oliver Stanley, 203p
England - Mightier Yet (1939, The National Review Ltd.) - an analysis of the problems confronting the British Government, 232p
Christ is no Pacifist: the Religious and Secular Case against Pacifism, (1939, Boswell Publishing Co. Ltd.)
Thieves by the Grace of God (Boswell Publishing Co. Ltd.) - a novel exposing the great injustice of re-housing
England's Purpose (1941, Rich & Cowan) - English characteristics, 191p
Aprons of Fig Leaves (1942) - a novel
The Future of Europe (1944, Keliher, Hudson & Kearns, Ltd) - thoughts and analysis on the (then) current situation in Europe and the future, particularly in relation to Poland, 36p booklet
Why We Lost Singapore (1945, Dorothy Crisp & Co.) - newspaper articles written in 1942 and 1943 examining the political, economic and military situations before and during the war, 178p
The Commonsense of Christianity (1945, Rich & Cowan) 126p,
A Life for England (1946, Dorothy Crisp & Co.) - the causes of the discontents for which the author suggests the remedy, 311p
The Path for England (1947, Dorothy Crisp & Co.) 174p
A Light in the Night (1960, Holborn Publishing Co. Ltd) - memoirs from her time in Holloway Prison, calling attention to the need for prison reform, 156p
The Dominance of England (1960, Holborn Publishing Co. Ltd) - political and statistical analysis of Britain's role, contribution and relationships with Allies - particularly the US - during World War II
Truth Too Near the Heels (1986, Spider Web - possibly published privately) - book title taken from metaphysical poet George Herbert's quote: "Follow not truth too near the heels, lest it dash out thy teeth.", 260p

== Selected books published by Dorothy Crisp & Co Ltd (as publisher) ==
Old Mrs Warren by Faith Wolseley (1939) - a humorous novel, 324p
Empire Relations (1942) – The Peter le Neve Foster Lecture, Delivered on the 3rd June 1942, at the Royal Society of Arts by The Right Hon. The Viscount Bennett, P.C., K.C. by R. B. Bennett (1945), 43p
Song of the City by Peter Abrahams (1943) - a novel, 179p
With the Fourteenth Army by D F Karaka (1945) - a personal account of the Burma Campaign in World War II, 85p
By Parachute to Warsaw by Marek Celt - pen name of Tadeusz Chciuk-Celt (1945) - a first-hand account of conditions in Poland in 1944 by a Polish secret agent
Between Tears and Laughter by Lin Yutang (1945) - the Chinese author & inventor's bitter plea for the West to change its perspective of the world order
Living in Sin by Peter Paxton (1945)
Mine Boy by Peter Abrahams (1946) - a seminal novel describing the horrific reality of South Africa's apartheid system of racial discrimination
One Hour of Justice by Arthur Cecil Alport (1946) - a denunciation of the living conditions of the Egyptian poor, 311p
Stony Ground by John Norwood (1946) - Subtitled The Australia Book for English Boys & Girls (and Their Parents), 158p
Thus My Orient by Hubert S Banner (1947) - 12 short stories, 220p
Singapore: A Police Background by Rene H Onraet (1947) - an examination of colonial life and attitudes from 1907 to 1930s by a former Inspector-General of Police

== Sources ==
- Notable Sussex Women: 580 Biographical Sketches, Helena Wojtczak, Hastings Press, 2008, Pages 186–7, ISBN 978-1-904109-15-0
- Death of John Becker in 1948, Newspaper report, The Straits Times (Singapore), 16 March 1949, Page 10
- Abstracts for Rethinking Right-Wing Women, Bodleian, Oxford, 29–30 June 2015
- Abstract: A 'Mixture of Britannia and Boadicea': Dorothy Crisp's Conservatism and the Limits of Right-Wing Women's Political Activism, 1927–48

IMAGES:

- 1947 September: Meeting Of The British Housewives League At The Central Hall Westminster. Mrs Helen Hart (foreground) And Mrs Dorothy Becker (née: Miss Dorothy Crisp) Battle For The Microphone On The Platform. Credits: Tony Marshall/Associated Newspapers/Shutterstock
- 1958 October: Mrs Dorothy Becker (née: Miss Dorothy Crisp) Former Chairman Of The British Housewives League Walking Away From Holloway Jail After Serving Time For Obtaining Credit Without Disclosing She Was Bankrupt. Box 710 51710169 Credits: Bill Johnson/Associated Newspapers/Shutterstock
