= Pilgrims Society =

British-American organization, founded 1902

The Pilgrims Society, founded on 16 July 1902 by Sir Harry Brittain KBE CMG, is a British-American society established, in the words of American diplomat Joseph Choate, 'to promote good-will, good-fellowship, and everlasting peace between the United States and Great Britain'. It is not to be confused with the Pilgrim Society of Plymouth, Massachusetts.

== Membership ==
Over the years it has boasted an elite membership of politicians, diplomats, businessmen, and writers who have included Henry Kissinger, Margaret Thatcher, Caspar Weinberger, Douglas Fairbanks Jr., Henry Luce, Lord Carrington, Alexander Haig, Paul Volcker, Thomas Kean, George Shultz, and Walter Cronkite among many others. Members of the immediate Royal Family, United States secretaries of state and United States ambassadors to the Court of St. James's are customarily admitted ex officio to membership in the Society. The Pilgrims of Great Britain and the Pilgrims of the United States have reciprocal membership.

Executive Committee members are and have included:

- Marshal of the Royal Air Force the Lord Stirrup KG GCB AFC (President)
- Diane Simpson
- Piers Coleman (Honorary Secretary)
- Mark Seligman (Honorary Treasurer)
- Abdul Bhanji
- Sir Peter Bottomley
- Peter Cadbury
- Kweilen Hatleskog (Chairman)
- Air Marshal Sir David Walker KCVO OBE
- Xenia Wickett
- Admiral Sir George Michael Zambellas, GCB, DSC, ADC, DL, FRAeS
- Mark Fox
- Fionuala Goritas
- Charles V Anson CVO
- Christopher Box
- Professor Kathleen Burk
- Sir Peter Westmacott GCMG LVO

Amy Thompson is the Executive Secretary, and successor to Tessa Wells.

== Activities ==
The Society is notable for holding dinners to welcome into office each successive U.S. Ambassador to the United Kingdom. The patron of the society is King Charles III.

Prime Minister Winston Churchill delivered a speech to the Society on March 18, 1941.

== History ==
The first informal meeting of the Pilgrims of Great Britain included General Joseph Wheeler, Colonel (later General Sir) Bryan Mahon, the Hon Charles Rolls and Harry Brittain. The first meeting of the Pilgrims of the United States was at the Waldorf Astoria Hotel in New York on 13 January, 1903. Towards the end of the 19th century, the two English-speaking nations had a great rapprochement. Closer coordination between elites on both sides of the Atlantic was necessary, with the Pilgrims Society able to act as a semi-official channel between the two governments. The Pilgrims connected influential families in the US, such as the Astors, Du Ponts, Rockefellers, Carnegies, Morgans and Vanderbilts, ⁣⁣with the British nobility and royal family. In addition to the British aristocracy and politics, important British banks and media houses were also represented. Almost all the early American members were White Anglo-Saxon Protestants from the east coast and were connected through their shared socialization in the fraternities and sororities of universities such as Yale or Harvard. It was similar on the British side, with the corresponding equivalents being Oxford and Cambridge. The Pilgrims Society also had strong overlaps with other important social clubs and associations on the east coast of the United States, bringing together the who's who of society.

The Pilgrims Society held opulent banquets between the American and British branches, which in turn also held regular meetings of their members. The centers of activity were New York City and London. Ideas to found further branches of the exclusive club in cities such as Liverpool were ultimately not implemented. During World War I, the Pilgrims Society supported the U.S. entry into the war through “public diplomacy.” In 1921, allies of the Pilgrims Society families Morgan, Warburg and Rockefeller founded the Council on Foreign Relations. In the following interwar period, the activities of the Pilgrims were limited by America's isolationism and the Great Depression. Many American and British Pilgrims supported the appeasement policy towards Hitler's Germany, and in some cases even sympathized with the idea of seeing fascism as a “bulwark” against communism. This changed with the onset of World War II and the bombing of Britain by the Germans, which led to expressions of solidarity from American Pilgrims with the British. In March 1941, Winston Churchill delivered a speech before the Pilgrims in London in which he tried to present the Americans' entry into the war and victory over the Axis powers as inevitable.

With the end of the Second World War and the beginning of the Cold War, the focus of the Pilgrims' meetings changed. Now, the main priorities became containing communism and creating a unified Europe. The Pilgrims also became more dominated by their American offshoot, which was at the same time not as much dominated by the old protestant east coast elite. In 1977, women were allowed to attend for the first time. During the Cold War, many important conservatives on both sides of the Atlantic were present at the Pilgrims' meetings. On the American side, these included Henry Kissinger, Caspar Weinberger, Alexander Haig and George Shultz, who played important roles in the Nixon and Reagan administrations. On the British side, members included Margaret Thatcher and NATO Secretary General Peter Carington, 6th Baron Carrington, underlining the network's importance for Anglo-American relations during the Cold War. In 2002, the Pilgrims Society celebrated its 100th anniversary at St James's Palace in the presence of Queen Elizabeth II and Prince Charles.

== Notable members ==
- Secretary of State Dean Acheson
- Senator Nelson W. Aldrich
- Ambassador Winthrop W. Aldrich
- Businessman John Jacob Astor IV
- Businessman William Waldorf Astor
- Secretary of State Zbigniew Brzezinski
- Philanthropist John Nicholas Brown II
- Senator Prescott Bush
- Columbia University President Nicholas Murray Butler
- Philanthropist Andrew Carnegie
- NATO Secretary General Lord Carrington
- King Charles III
- Journalist Walter Cronkite
- Ambassador John W. Davis
- Vice President Charles G. Dawes
- Admiral William J. Crowe
- Senator Chauncey Depew
- CIA Director Allen W. Dulles
- Secretary of State John Foster Dulles
- Queen Elizabeth II
- Ambassador James W. Gerard
- General Alexander Haig
- Ambassador to the United States Edward Wood, 1st Earl of Halifax
- Ambassador W. Averell Harriman
- New Jersey Governor Thomas Kean
- Ambassador Joseph P. Kennedy
- Secretary of State Henry Kissinger
- Ambassador Henry R. Luce
- General of the Army George C. Marshall
- Secretary of the Treasury Andrew W. Mellon
- Financier John Pierpont Morgan Sr.
- Financier John Pierpont Morgan Jr.
- Secretary of the Treasury Henry Morgenthau Jr.
- Supreme Court Justice Sandra Day O'Connor
- Congressman Ogden Reid
- Publisher Ogden Mills Reid
- Ambassador Whitelaw Reid
- Publisher Whitelaw Reid
- Attorney General Elliot Richardson
- Secretary of Defense Donald Rumsfeld
- Oil Refiner John D. Rockefeller
- Banker David Rockefeller
- Vice President Nelson Rockefeller
- Secretary of State Elihu Root
- Banker Jacob Schiff
- Secretary of State George Shultz
- Publisher Arthur Ochs Sulzberger
- Prime Minister Margaret Thatcher
- Secretary of State Cyrus Vance
- Federal Reserve Chairman Paul Volcker
- Secretary of Defense Caspar Weinberger
- Ambassador John Hay Whitney
- Banker Felix M. Warburg
- Banker Paul Warburg
- Theologian Robin Ward
- World Bank President James Wolfensohn
- CIA Director James Woolsey
