= Peter Floud =

British civil servant and official

Peter Castle Floud CBE, (1 June 1911 – 22 January 1960) was a British civil servant and official of the United Nations Relief and Rehabilitation Administration, administering missions in Egypt, Iran, and Albania. He was also an authority on William Morris.

== Early life ==
The elder son of Sir Francis Floud KCB KCSI, KCMG, DCL, he was born together with twin sister Molly (m. du Sautoy) on 1 June 1911. Peter Floud was the brother of the politician Bernard Floud. Both brothers were educated at Gresham's School, Holt, and Wadham College, Oxford.

After graduating in 1931, Peter passed the Civil Service Examination for admission to the Civil Service. He was admitted to the London School of Economics for research in the history of the industrial arts in Britain with special reference to the work of William Morris.

In 1938 he married the sociologist Jean MacDonald (CBE) with whom he had three children, Andrew, Frances and Esther.

== Career outline ==
- 1935–1939: Assistant-Keeper, Victoria and Albert Museum
- 1939–1944: Served for the London Regional Headquarters of the Ministry of Home Security
- 1944–1946: Administrator of UNRRA Balkan and Middle East Missions in Cairo and Teheran
- 1946/1947: Chief of UNRRA Mission to Albania
- 1947–1960: Keeper, Department of Circulation at the Victoria and Albert Museum
- 1950–1953: Chairman of the Children's Section of the International Council of Museums
- 1955: Made a Governor of the National Museum of Wales

== The Department of Circulation, Victoria and Albert Museum ==
More information on the Circulation Department Floud joined the staff of the Victoria and Albert Museum in 1935 as an Assistant Keeper in the Department of Circulation, which sent touring exhibitions around the UK. He broke off his work with the museum on the outbreak of war but returned following the completion of his secondment to the Department of Home Security and was made Keeper of the Department of Circulation. Together with a team of three women, - Barbara Morris, Shirley Bury and Elizabeth Aslin - Peter broke important ground in the study of the history of industrial arts. The great achievement of this team was a ground-breaking exhibition titled 'Victorian and Edwardian Decorative Arts,' which was staged in 1952. It proved unexpectedly popular with the public and put the V&A at the forefront of the revival of interest in Victorian progressive design. Peter's work for the museum was recognised in 1954 by his appointment as CBE. In 1955 he was made a Governor of the National Museum of Wales as part of his museum work. Floud was praised as 'that rare kind of scholar who was able to apply to the material culture of his own day his vast store of knowledge and his ability to discriminate'.

== Death ==
Peter Floud died on 22 January 1960, aged 48, from an inoperable brain tumor.
