= Bernard Floud =

British farmer, business executive and politician

Bernard Francis Castle Floud (22 March 1915 – 10 October 1967) was a British farmer, television company executive and politician. He was the father of the economic historian Sir Roderick Floud.

== Early life ==
He was born in Epsom, Surrey, the son of Sir Francis Floud, the British High Commissioner to Canada and was educated at Gresham's School in Holt, Norfolk, and Wadham College, Oxford. He served in the Army from 1939 to 1942, then as a wartime civil servant in the Ministry of Information from 1942 to 1945. At the end of the war, he moved to the Board of Trade before leaving the Civil Service in 1951 to become a farmer in Essex.

In 1937, Floud had joined the Labour Party. He was a Labour councillor in Kelvedon Hatch Parish Council from 1952 to 1961 and Ongar Rural District Council from 1952 to 1955. From 1955, he was an executive with Granada Television. He also fought Chelmsford for the Labour Party at the 1955 general election and Hemel Hempstead at the 1959 general election. He was Chairman of the Independent Television Labour Relations Committee in 1963. His son, Professor Sir Roderick Floud, was Provost of Gresham College 2008–14.

== Parliament and death ==
Floud was elected to Parliament in the 1964 general election for Acton, gaining the marginal seat from the Conservatives with a majority of 2,599, and was re-elected in 1966 with an increased majority of 4,941. He was depressed after the death of his wife Ailsa after a long illness in January 1967 and he too had suffered from ill-health for some time. In March he agreed to undergo psychiatric treatment, but had a relapse in June, and after a holiday in August he returned to his constituency work.

Harold Wilson had mentioned that he was considering appointing Floud to the government, and MI5 was asked to approve his security clearance. Although Wilson had a standing policy to deny MI5 the right to interrogate MPs, the service strenuously objected; Wilson subsequently allowed an interrogation after being sent a brief on Floud. Floud had been friends with many Communists while at Oxford, and was directly named by two separate inactive agents as having worked as a spy in the past, handling recruitment. The interrogation by Peter Wright was intense, lasting two days and producing neither an admission nor denial of guilt, even when Wright explained that without any further clarification on the matter, MI5 would be forced to deny him the clearance for the appointment. He returned to work shortly after the conclusion of the second day of questioning, but upon leaving his office at Granada Television he said he was "unable to go on". Six months later, 10 October 1967, he killed himself allegedly by taking an overdose of barbiturates and also gassing himself with carbon monoxide at his St Pancras home. He was 52 years old.

Acton was regained by the Conservative Kenneth Baker in the subsequent by-election in March 1968.

== Accusations of espionage ==
The author Chapman Pincher, in Their Trade is Treachery (1981), alleged that Floud had been presented by MI5 with evidence that he had worked for the KGB and recruited others to its service. This was firmly rebutted in a letter to The Times by his sister-in-law Jean Floud. The claim that Floud had been presented with evidence was repeated by Wright in 1987 upon the release of his autobiography, Spycatcher.

Wright's account is disputed by Professor Christopher Andrew in The Defence of the Realm: the authorized history of MI5. On the basis of MI5 files, Andrew states that Wright and another MI5 agent interviewed Floud in the autumn of 1966 and finally in March 1967, culminating in an interview on 20 March 1967 at which Floud was told that: "because of lack of frankness about his past Communist associations, he was regarded as a 'full security risk' and could not therefore be given security clearance. Floud can have been in little doubt that his prospects of a ministerial career had gone." Andrew suggests that this "added to his despair" arising from a long-standing depressive illness and his wife's death. Andrew concludes that "Save for the personal tragedy with which it was associated, the investigation of Floud was of less importance than it seemed to the Security Service at the time. There was – and is – no evidence that he had any Communist contacts after 1952. His pre-war contacts with Soviet intelligence are also unlikely to have been of great significance, though it would have been very different" if Jenifer Fischer Williams, later wife of H. L. A. Hart, whom Floud had recruited to the Communist cause, had decided to become a Soviet agent, instead of leaving the Party and pursuing a career with the Home Office and later Oxford University.

Floud's elder brother Peter Floud, one-time Keeper of the Department of Circulation in the Victoria and Albert Museum, was also among those identified by Peter Wright as linked to the suspected Oxford Ring as well as Jenifer Hart, an Oxford academic. Another person linked to the ring was Phoebe Pool, who admitted passing messages to the Floud brothers from the KGB spy-handler "Otto", identified as Arnold Deutsch. Peter Floud died suddenly at the age of 48.

Parliament of the United Kingdom
Preceded by Philip Holland	Member of Parliament for Acton; 1964–1967	Succeeded by Kenneth Baker
