= David Åslin =

Swedish professional ice hockey forward

David Aslin
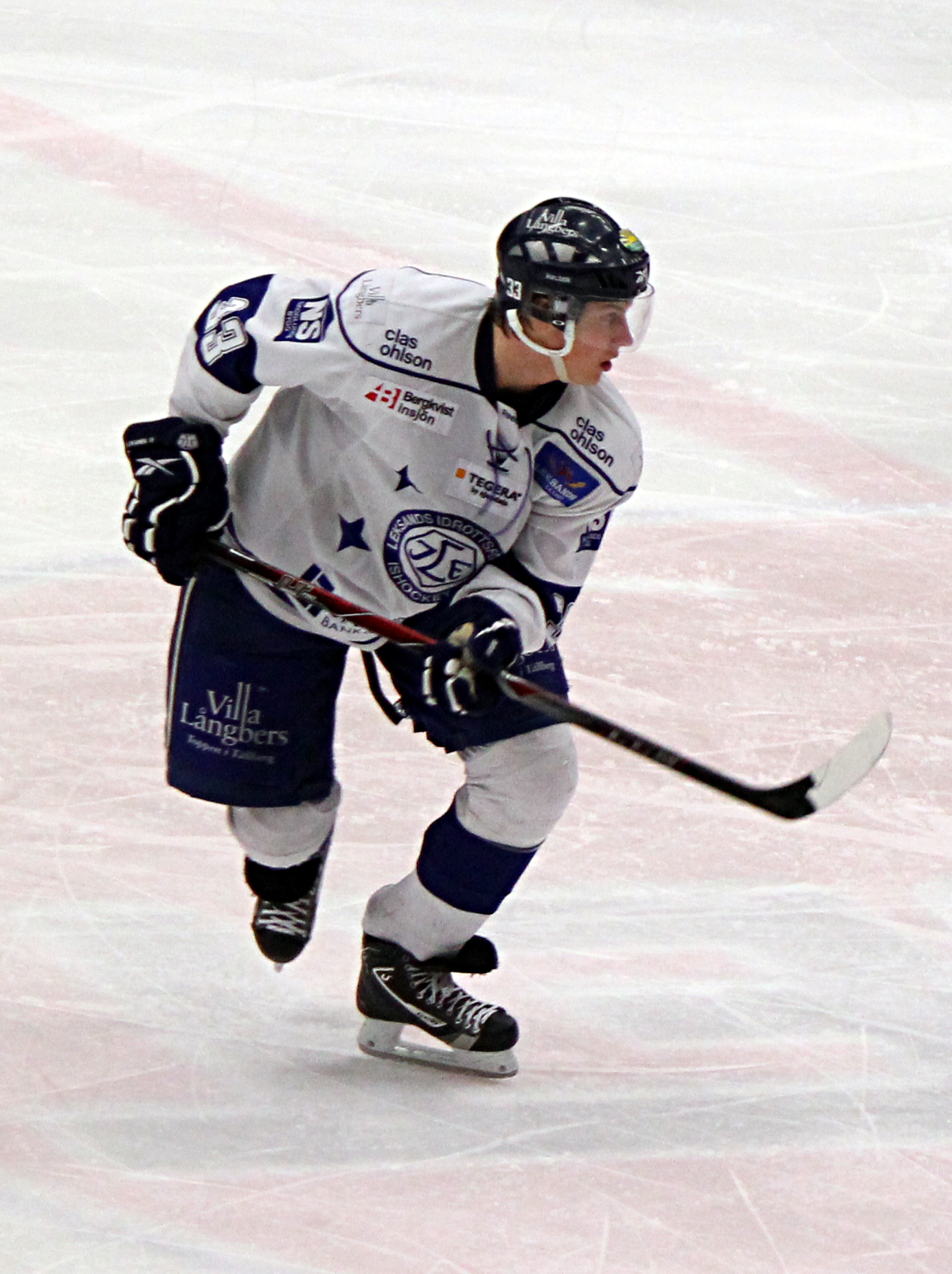
- Born: July 26, 1989 (age 35); Mora, Sweden
- Height: 6 ft 0 in (183 cm)
- Weight: 192 lb (87 kg; 13 st 10 lb)
- Position: Winger
- Shoots: Left
- team Former teams: Ringerike Panthers 2021- Växjö Lakers; Leksands IF; Rögle BK
- Playing career: 2008–present

David Aslin (born July 26, 1989) is a Swedish professional ice hockey forward. He is currently an unrestricted free agent who most recently played with Södertälje SK of the HockeyAllsvenskan (Allsv).

Aslin made his Swedish Hockey League debut playing with Växjö Lakers during the 2012–13 SHL season.

Aslin is currently playing for Ringerike Panthers in Norway
