= British Housewives' League =

Right-wing UK advocacy group

The British Housewives' League is a right-wing, non-party group that seeks to act as the voice of the British housewife, providing advice and encouraging active participation in society. The League seeks to defend the UK's independence and constitution, to promote Christian values, and to discourage excessive state control. In the past the League has campaigned against rationing, identity cards, fluoridation campaigns in the 1950s and UK membership of the European Union.

The newsletter of the League has been called Housewives Today, and Home but now produces a magazine called The Lantern.

The League was founded in June 1945 by Irene Lovelock, who became its first chairman. As a housewife during the Second World War, Lovelock encountered the problems of rationing, shortages and queueing. In April 1946 Lovelock resigned from the chair of the League to become its president. Its membership was more than 70,000 in 1948. Lovelock wrote an unpublished memoir of the League.

Another prominent chairman of the League was Dorothy Crisp, a journalist and writer of provocative articles in the Sunday Dispatch. Under her direction it developed a campaigning posture on women, the state and the dangers of socialism, similar to that of the Conservative Party in the 1940s. Crisp had been a member of the Conservatives and published books promoting both conservatism and Christianity. She had sought the Conservative nomination for the by-election held in Acton in 1943, and when unsuccessful, she stood as an independent candidate. However the Housewives' League has as a founding principle that it is not party political and will not be used to promote any political party. Crisp was subject of a patronising article referring to her as "the buxom, brown-eyed, voluble little woman", by Gordon Beckles, published in the 12 July 1947 issue of Leader Magazine under the title of "Housewife of England!". It featured a photo of her giving a speech on behalf of the League. It has been said that Dorothy Crisp is the historical figure who most resembles Margaret Thatcher. The League's membership was more than 70,000 in 1948.

After the Attlee government the League declined in numbers but continued, opposing the European Economic Community and the permissive society while supporting apartheid-era South Africa. The League became associated with the far-right British League of Rights and, in 1972 the two groups reached an agreement to share offices.

== Post-War bread rationing and nationalisation ==
At its peak the League claimed over 100,000 members, and their collective voice was felt in many rallies against post war bread rationing. Food rationing had been established early in the Second World War. After six long years, this frustration with austerity and state control became a political issue, particularly among women who longed for some purchasing power and freedom of choice. Meat, bacon, butter, sugar, eggs, tea, cheese, milk, sweets, clothes, petrol were all still restricted.

In February 1946, new cuts were made on poultry and eggs. During the war, bread had never been rationed, it was however introduced in 1946, for two years. Bread rationing caused an outcry, particularly from housewives, as post-war historian Peter Hennessy writes "the celebrated British Housewives' League was already becoming a thorn in ministerial flesh". By the summer of 1946 over half a million signatures had been collected by the League, under the banner 'Bread: No Ration' petition. The Daily Sketch 3 July 1946 reported one of the League's larger provincial protest marches in Cheltenham.

It was this fallout with the Labour (Attlee) Government that led to political change, since many women turned to the Conservative party. Their subsequent election victory in 1951 became for many a statement of discontent with Labour. As one woman expressed it, ‘the last election was lost mainly in the queue at the butcher's or the grocer's'

During the spring and summer of 1946 intense opposition to bread rationing was led by the Conservative Party, which doubted that the policy was really necessary and that substantial savings in wheat could be made. The Party leadership deplored the added burden placed on consumers and alleged that the government had mismanaged the supply situation. The Conservatives were backed by the right-wing press, which highlighted opposition to bread rationing among bakers as well as the British Housewives' League. This episode was the first concerted campaign against the Labour government on a major policy issue and marked the beginning of the debate about postwar food policy.

As the war ended domestic politics returned to normal. The landslide election victory of the Labour (Attlee) Government in 1945, led the private sector into a series of propaganda campaigns about the threat of nationalisation. These included the so-called Mr Cube Campaign (Tate & Lyle) of 1949/50, against the possibility of the nationalisation of the sugar industry. The 'Aims of Industry', an anti-socialist pressure group formed in 1942 by a group of well-known British industrialists, with representatives from Fords, English Electric, Austin, Rank, British Aircraft, Macdougall's and Firestone Tyres. There were also smaller campaigns by the Cement Makers Federation, the Iron and Steel Federation and by the insurance companies represented by the British Insurance Association. The Road Haulage Association sponsored the anti-nationalisation campaigns by the British Housewives' League, led by Dorothy Crisp.

== British Pathé newsreels reporting British Housewives' protests ==
Before television was widely available, short news films was distributed to cinemas' all over the country. People flocked to the cinema to watch newsreels with the latest information or for feature films which allowed them to escape the oppression and austerity of the war for a few hours. By 1946, national cinema audiences peaked at 1.64 billion, with many people going 2 – 3 times a week.

After the Second World War, many of these films were made about women welcoming their men back from the front and being keen to please them. But not all women were happy to ‘muddle along' or passively accept the status quo. As a number of newsreels from Pathé News illustrate, many women felt empowered to protest at the continued government restrictions and hardship that existed in the immediate post-war years.

In July 1946, the newsreel featured a demonstration against bread rationing organised by the British Housewives' League in Trafalgar Square, London.

The film opens with the title 'July 21' - the date when bread rationing will begin. The news item then reports on protests against bread rationing by women's groups. Mrs Hilda Davis, is named as leading a group setting up a petition against the rationing, calling on an "army of indignant housewives". The film then shows the Food Minister, John Strachey speaking about improved prospects for North American crops, on his return from the US. The film then states that bread rationing will go ahead on the 21st, despite continued protests. "Vicar's wife and food crusader" Mrs Lovelock is then seen addressing a group of women at a meeting of the British Housewives' League. She states that "we, the housewives of Great Britain are in open revolt against bread rationing" and says that rationing will hit the poorest the most and the League will not stand for it. The film then shows a civil servant working in 'bread control' looking at a new bread ration card and finishes with a close-up shot of the ration card and a loaf of bread. The final commentary warns "watch out this doesn't go under the counter".

== ID cards ==
The League's campaign against the Identity Cards issued under the National Registration Act 1939 began on a very wet Saturday in April 1951. Four officers of the British Housewives' League stood outside the Palace of Westminster and tried to burn their papers, following the example of Harry Willcock. Struggling against the driving rain, only one succeeded; Mrs Beatrice Palmer, of Sidcup, tucked her National Registration Identity Card in a coffee tin and lit it. Within a year the Cards were no more; the National Registration Act expired on 22 May 1952.

They had been protesting "in the hope that attention will be drawn to the increasing pauperisation of the British people". ID cards had been introduced on the outbreak of the Second World War in 1939. They had also been introduced earlier between 1915 and 1919, during the First World War, but were considered a failure. They were a supposedly short-term emergency war-time measure and, by the 1950s, were deeply unpopular.

Under the Labour (Blair) Government's Identity Cards Act 2006 ID cards were again to be gradually reintroduced; most Britons, Home Secretary Jacqui Smith said, should have one by 2017. The now much-diminished the British Housewives' League's honorary secretary, Lynn Riley, was reported as saying "We are animated about this now as we were in the early 1950s." "I remember when we joined Europe we were told we wouldn't need our passports to go to France or Spain or Portugal and we thought that was wonderful. What we did not realise is that we would need an ID card to go to Tesco." "This is a declaration of war by the state on its people." Initial cards were introduced for those who wanted them in 2009, but the cards were abolished by the Identity Documents Act 2010 after a change of government.

== British Housewives' League today ==
The British Housewives' League still existed in 2000 and attempted to show that excessive control by the state is not in the interest of a free and happy home-life, or the development of personality in accordance with Christian tradition. Associates included Victoria Gillick, prominent in the 'pro-life' movement and opponent of sex education in schools.

== In the media ==
The British Housewives' League was the subject of a 2016 episode of the BBC Radio 4 series Archive on 4 titled "The League of Extraordinary Housewives".

== Sources ==
- Chris Cook, Sources in British political history 1900-1951 vol 1 1975
- James Hinton, Women, Social Leadership, and the Second World War: Continuities of Class OUP, 2002 p. 175
- James Hinton, "Militant Housewives: The British Housewives' League and the Attlee Government," History Workshop Journal 1994 (38): 128–156.
- The Times, various articles December 1943
- Encyclopedia of British & Irish Politic Organisations, Peter Barberis, John McHugh, Mike Tyldesley, Continuum Imprint, London 2000, ISBN 1-85567-264-2
