= Irene Lovelock =

British activist (1896–1974)

Irene May Lovelock (26 May 1896 – 9 August 1974) was the founder of the British Housewives' League.

== Early life ==
She was born Irene May Northover Smith on 26 May 1896 in Wood Green, London, the elder daughter of an ironmonger, William Northover Smith (1864–1953), and his wife, Florence Minnie Heath (1869–1943). She was educated in Margate and Finchley, and at the Birmingham School for Young Ladies.

== Career ==
Lovelock formed the British Housewives' League in June 1945, and was its chairman, until April 1946, when she became president. Its membership was more than 70,000 in 1948. The League ran a newsletter named ‘Housewives Today’ which looked mainly at the types of food available during rationing.

== Personal life ==
Her husband was a Church of England clergyman, the Revd John Herbert Lovelock (1903–1986), and they had three children.

Lovelock died at St George's Hospital, Tooting, London, on 9 August 1974.
