= National Registration Act 1939 =

Act of the Parliament of the United Kingdom

National Registration Act 1939 (Note: Section 12(1).)
- Act of Parliament
- Parliament of the United Kingdom
- Long title: An Act to make provision for the establishment of a National Register, for the issue of identity cards, and for purposes connected with the matter aforesaid.
- Citation: 2 & 3 Geo. 6. c. 91
- Territorial extent: United Kingdom (Note: Section 12(2).)

Dates
- Royal assent: 5 September 1939
- Commencement: 5 September 1939 (Note: The Acts of Parliament (Commencement) Act 1793.)
- Expired: 22 May 1952 (Note: Section 12(4).)
- Repealed: 18 December 1953
Other legislation
Repealed by	Statute Law Revision Act 1953

Status: Repealed

Text of statute as originally enacted

The National Registration Act 1939 (2 & 3 Geo. 6. c. 91) was an act of the Parliament of the United Kingdom. The initial National Registration Bill was introduced to Parliament as an emergency measure at the start of the Second World War.

The act provided for the establishment of a constantly-maintained national register of the civilian population of the United Kingdom and the Isle of Man, and for the issuance of identity cards based on data held in the register, and required civilians to present their identity cards on demand to police officers and other authorised persons. Following the passing of the act by Parliament on 5 September 1939, registrations and the issuing of identity cards commenced on 29 September. (Note: The act's provisions for registering civilians were extended to the Isle of Man by Order in Council, and the requirement for persons to produce their identity cards on demand was explicitly restated in the Production of Identity Cards Order, 1940.)

== Registration and identity cards ==
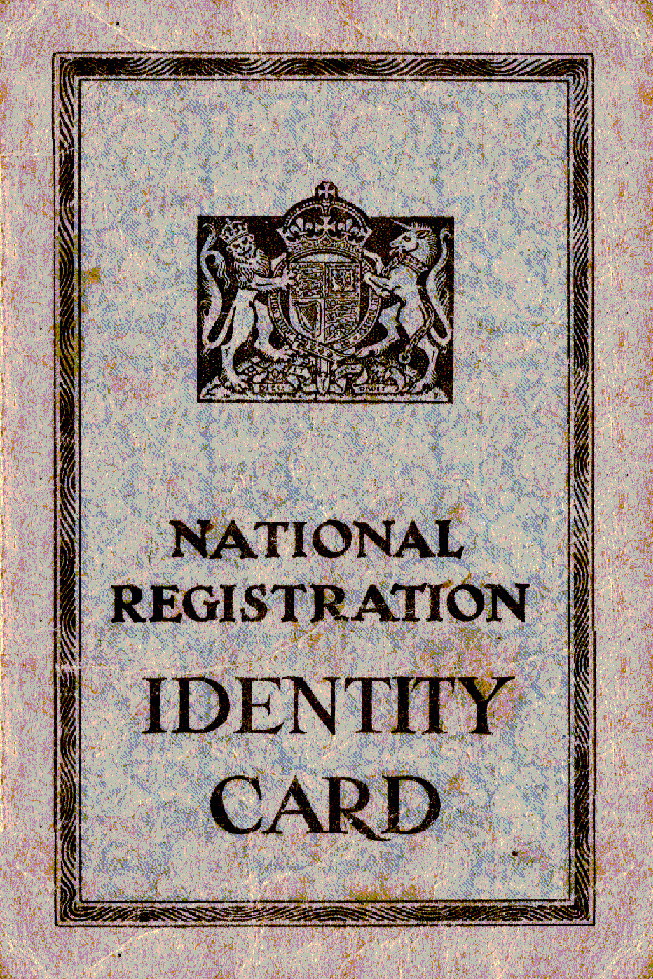
Front cover of an identity card issued to an adult in 1943

Every man, woman and child had to carry an identity (ID) card at all times and the cards would include the following information:

- Name
- Sex
- Date of birth (and thus age)
- Occupation, profession, trade or employment. The Register had also collected information on the role of persons in institutions, indicated by the initial letter of the terms Officer, Visitor, Servant, Patient, or Inmate.
- Address
- Marital status
- Membership of Naval, Military, or Air Force Reserves, or Auxiliary Forces, or of Civil Defence Services or Reserves.

The register differed from the decennial census in a number of ways, one of which was the place of birth was not recorded, and the second was that the register was meant to be a living document. Hence, perusal of the register shows that maiden surnames have been replaced by married surnames when registered persons later married.

In England and Wales, a team of 65,000 enumerators delivered forms ahead of the chosen day. On Friday 29 September 1939, householders were required to record details on the registration forms. On the following Sunday and Monday the enumerators visited every householder, checked the form and then issued a completed identity card for each of the residents. All cards at this time were the same brown/buff colour. Some 45 million identity cards were issued.

Three main reasons for the introduction of the identity cards were:

1. The major dislocation of the population caused by mobilisation and mass evacuation and also the wartime need for complete manpower control and planning in order to maximise the efficiency of the war economy.
2. The likelihood of rationing (introduced from January 1940 onwards).
3. Population statistics. As the last census had been held in 1931, there was little accurate data on which to base vital planning decisions. The National Register was in fact an instant census and the National Registration Act closely resembles the Census Act 1920 in many ways.

The register was also used to support the administration of rationing after this was introduced in January 1940.

=== 1943 (Blue) Identity Card ===
The more commonly found green version of the identity card (not the image shown) was issued in 1943 for adults. Until then, adult identity cards had been a buff (an off yellow) coloured card, not the same colour as children's cards, which was a manila coloured (brown) card. Government officials had green ID cards with endorsements, and a photograph, whilst those in the armed services, or temporary displaced persons were issued with a 'Blue' version of the identification cards.

Children under 16 were issued with Identity Cards, but they were to be kept by their parents.

Identification was necessary if families were separated from one another or their house was bombed, and if people were injured or killed.

The sections in the card showing the change in address were important, as many people moved several times during the war.

=== Class codes ===
Class Codes were used for administration and electoral purposes. Cards were marked A, B, C, N or V.

- A: Aged over 21
- B: Aged between 16 and 21

Additionally, all class code 'B' cards were followed by three numbers. The first two indicated the year in which the holder was born whilst the third indicated which quarter of the year the holder was born in. For example, B. 252 would show that the holder was born in the second quarter of 1925 and would also indicate to a polling clerk that the holder would attain adult status in the second quarter of 1946 (i.e. reach the age of 21).

- C: Appeared on yellow cards issued to workers from 'Eire' (Ireland) who were conditionally admitted to Great Britain.
- N: Cards re-issued under an altered name. (Note: There was no requirement to use the registered name in everyday life. In accordance with long-standing English practice, the use of aliases was permitted.)
- V: Placed on yellow cards issued to people over 16 arriving in this country who declared that they were usually resident outside the UK.

Temporary buff cards were issued to children under 16 but did not carry a class code.

== Expiry of the Act ==
On 21 February 1952, it ceased to be necessary to carry an identity card, and the Act itself formally expired on 22 May 1952. The last person prosecuted under the Act was Harry Willcock, who had refused to produce his identity card for a police officer in December 1950. Even after the National Registration system was abandoned in 1952, the National Registration number persisted, being used within the National Health Service, for voter registration, and for the National Insurance system.

== Genealogical significance ==
The register is particularly important for genealogists because:

- The individual records from the 1921 census were protected by the privacy provisions that forbade their release for 100 years, and thus they only became available in January 2022.
- The individual records concerning England and Wales from the 1931 census were entirely destroyed by a fire of indeterminate cause in December 1942.
- No census was undertaken during 1941.
- The register records the precise date of birth of those registered.

The lack of both the 1931 and 1941 censuses means that "the register provides the most complete survey of the population of England and Wales between 1921 and 1951, making it an invaluable resource for family, social and local historians". Indeed, between 2010 and the 2022 release of the 1921 census records, the 1939 register was the most complete, detailed, publicly available record of the population of England and Wales after 1911.

Unlike the decennial censuses, the 1939 register was designed as a working document for the duration of the war, and it was later used in the foundation of the National Health Service and recorded subsequent changes of name, notably in the case of single women who married after 1939. Those born after 1939 were recorded separately and that register has not been released.

== Access to information ==
=== England and Wales ===
The original register books relating to England and Wales were collated and maintained by the Central National Registration Office at Southport, Merseyside, and are now held by the Health and Social Care Information Centre (NHS Digital). In 2010, the NHS began offering to conduct searches of the registers compiled on 29 September 1939 to members of the public upon payment of a fee, and would provide extracts of the information found so long as it was known that it only concerned people who were no longer living.

In 2015, The National Archives entered into an agreement under which the original 29 September 1939 registers—as updated by the NHS until 1991—have been scanned, digitised, and made available subject to privacy restrictions on the subscription-based Findmypast website. The digital images can also be viewed free-of-charge at The National Archives's reading rooms in Kew. For the first four months, from the 2 November 2015 launch, it was accessible on a pay-per-view basis, then it was unlimited access to annual premium subscribers. From spring 2018 onwards, it was available via MyHeritage, then Ancestry.com.

The archive's access project does not, however, include records related to people who were first registered after 29 September 1939, as this information is contained in separate register books that as of November 2022 have not been made available to the public.

=== Scotland ===
The registration process in Scotland was conducted by the General Register Office for Scotland. The register was used as the basis for the NHS Central Register from 1948 onwards but, unlike in England and Wales, the original register books remained with the General Register Office and are now held by the National Records of Scotland (NRS). Following a successful application under the Freedom of Information (Scotland) Act 2002 in December 2009, members of the public have been able to apply to the NRS for an official extract from the 1939 register of information concerning people who are no longer living. However, on the grounds that a Scottish census record is invariably sealed for 100 years, the information in the extract is limited to the person's address, age, occupation, and marital status at the time of registration.

=== Northern Ireland ===
Registration records for Northern Ireland are held by the Public Record Office of Northern Ireland (PRONI). Following two successful applications under the Freedom of Information Act 2000 in 2010, PRONI in principle allows members of the public to submit a request in the form of a general research enquiry to obtain an extract from the 1939 register for a specified address, including information about inhabitants born over 100 years ago and/or residents whose proof of death is submitted with the request.

However, due to the collapse of the Northern Ireland Assembly between 2017 and 2020, PRONI, as a division within the Assembly's Department for Communities, was unable to fulfil requests. Further delays were added by restrictions put in place during the COVID-19 pandemic.

As of 2010 the collection was unindexed and staff had to retrieve data manually by carrying out a page-by-page search.

=== Isle of Man ===
Registration records for the Isle of Man are not known to have survived.

== Subsequent developments ==
The whole act was repealed by section 1 of, and the first schedule to, the Statute Law Revision Act 1953 (2 & 3 Eliz. 2. c. 5), which came into force on 18 December 1953.

== See also ==
- NHS number
- Identity Cards Act 2006
- Rayner Goddard, Baron Goddard
- Defence Regulations
- Timeline of the United Kingdom home front during World War II
