= Johanne Walhorn =

German lawyer (1911–1995)

Johanne Walhorn (born 19 February 1911 in Düsseldorf; died 24 May 1995 in Ischia) was a German lawyer and the third woman in the city of Münster history to be awarded the Paulus Badge for her services to the city. Being active in social life, she managed to work in 23 committees of Münster, re-established the German Housewives Association in Münster, was chairwoman of the district group of the Hausfrauenverein Münster, in 1951, initiated the "meat strike", built up the Kreiskreis Münster of the German Joint Welfare Association, played a great role in establishing Consumer Advice Center, in 1990, she founded the regional group Westphalia of the German Lawyers' Association.
