= List of elections in 1992 =

The following elections occurred in the year 1992.

== Africa ==
- 1992 Angolan general election
- 1992 Burkinabé parliamentary election
- 1992 Burundian constitutional referendum
- 1992 Cameroonian parliamentary election
- 1992 Cameroonian presidential election
- 1992 Central African Republic general election
- 1992 Comorian legislative election
- 1992 Comorian constitutional referendum
- 1992 Congolese parliamentary election
- 1992 Republic of the Congo presidential election
- 1992 Republic of the Congo constitutional referendum
- 1992 Djiboutian parliamentary election
- 1992 Djiboutian constitutional referendum
- 1992 Gambian general election
- 1992 Ghanaian parliamentary election
- 1992 Ghanaian presidential election
- 1992 Ghanaian constitutional referendum
- 1992 Kenyan general election
- 1992–1993 Malagasy presidential election
- 1992 Malagasy constitutional referendum
- 1992 Malawian general election
- 1992 Malian parliamentary election
- 1992 Malian presidential election
- 1992 Malian constitutional referendum
- 1992 Mauritanian parliamentary election
- 1992 Mauritanian presidential election
- 1992 Moroccan constitutional referendum
- 1992 Namibian local and regional elections
- 1992 Nigerian parliamentary election
- 1992 Nigerien constitutional referendum
- 1992 Republic of the Congo parliamentary election
- 1992 Seychellois constitutional commission election
- 1992 Seychellois constitutional referendum
- 1992 South African apartheid referendum

== Asia ==
- 1992 Azerbaijani presidential election
- 1992 Indian presidential election
- 1992 Indian vice presidential election
- 1992 Indonesian legislative election
- 1992 Iranian legislative election
- 1992 Israeli legislative election
- 1992 Japanese House of Councillors election
- 1992 Kurdistan Region legislative election
- 1992 Kuwaiti general election
- 1992 Laotian parliamentary election
- 1992 Lebanese general election
- 1992 Mongolian parliamentary election
- 1992 Philippine House of Representatives elections
- 1992 Philippine Sangguniang Kabataan election
- 1992 Philippine Senate election
- 1992 Philippine general election
- 1992 Philippine presidential election
- 1992 Republic of China legislative election
- 1992 South Korean legislative election
- 1992 South Korean presidential election
- March 1992 Thai general election
- September 1992 Thai general election
- 1992 Turkmenistani presidential election
- 1992 Vietnamese legislative election

== Europe ==
- 1992 Albanian parliamentary election
- 1992 Albanian local elections
- 1992 Andorran parliamentary election
- 1992 Austrian presidential election
- 1992 Azerbaijani presidential election
- 1992 Bulgarian presidential election
- Croatia:
  - 1992 Croatian parliamentary election
  - 1992 Croatian presidential election
- 1992 Czechoslovak parliamentary election was held in Czechoslovakia in June 1992, alongside elections for the Czech and Slovak Assemblies
  - 1992 Czech legislative election
- 1992 Speaker of the Czech National Council election
- 1992 Civic Democratic Party leadership election (winner: Václav Klaus)
- 1992 Czechoslovak presidential election (from July to October 1992)
- 1992 Estonian parliamentary election
- 1992 Estonian presidential election
- 1992 Fianna Fáil leadership election
- 1992 Finnish local elections
- France
  - 1992 Alsace regional election
  - 1992 Brittany regional election
  - 1992 French Maastricht Treaty referendum
  - 1992 French regional elections
  - 1992 French cantonal elections
- 1992 Georgian general election
- 1992 Gibraltar general election
- 1992 Icelandic presidential election
- 1992 Irish general election
- November 1992 Irish constitutional referendums
- 1992 Italian general election
- 1992 Italian presidential election
- 1992 Lithuanian parliamentary election
- 1992 Maltese general election
- Montenegro: 1992–93 Montenegrin general election
- 1992 Romanian local elections
- 1992 Romanian presidential election
- Serbia:
  - 1992 Serbian constitutional referendum
  - 1992 Serbian parliamentary election
  - 1992 Serbian presidential election
- 1992 Slovak parliamentary election
- 1992 Slovenian parliamentary election
- 1992 Slovenian presidential election
- Spain: 1992 Catalan parliamentary election
- Yugoslavia:
  - May 1992 Yugoslavian parliamentary election
  - December 1992 Yugoslavian parliamentary election

=== United Kingdom ===
- 1992 United Kingdom general election
- 1992 United Kingdom general election in England
- 1992 United Kingdom general election in Northern Ireland
- 1992 United Kingdom general election in Scotland
- 1992 United Kingdom general election in Wales
- 1992 Labour Party leadership election
- 1992 Scottish District local elections

==== United Kingdom local ====
- 1992 United Kingdom local elections

===== English local =====
- 1992 Bristol City Council election
- 1992 Manchester Council election
- 1992 Trafford Council election
- 1992 Wolverhampton Council election

==== United Kingdom general ====
- 1992 United Kingdom general election
  - England: 1992 United Kingdom general election in England
  - Scotland: 1992 United Kingdom general election in Scotland
  - Wales: 1992 United Kingdom general election in Wales
  - Northern Ireland: 1992 United Kingdom general election in Northern Ireland
  - List of MPs elected in the 1992 United Kingdom general election
- List of United Kingdom Parliament constituencies (1983–1997)
- List of United Kingdom Parliament constituencies (1983–1997) by region
- Sheffield Rally
- It's The Sun Wot Won It
- War of Jennifer's Ear

== Japan ==
- 1992 Japanese House of Councillors election

== North America ==
=== Canada ===
- 1992 Edmonton municipal election
- 1992 Manitoba municipal elections
- 1992 Winnipeg municipal election
- 1992 Yukon general election

=== Caribbean ===
- 1992 Bahamian general election
- 1992 Caymanian general election
- 1992 Puerto Rican general election
- 1992 Saint Lucian general election
- Tobago House of Assembly election
- 1992 United States Virgin Islands gambling referendum

=== United States ===
- 1992 United States elections
- 1992 United States presidential election

==== United States lieutenant gubernatorial ====
- 1992 Delaware lieutenant gubernatorial election
- 1992 Missouri lieutenant gubernatorial election
- 1992 North Carolina lieutenant gubernatorial election

==== United States gubernatorial ====
- 1992 Delaware gubernatorial election
- 1992 Indiana gubernatorial election
- 1992 Missouri gubernatorial election
- 1992 Montana gubernatorial election
- 1992 New Hampshire gubernatorial election
- 1992 North Carolina gubernatorial election
- 1992 North Dakota gubernatorial election
- 1992 Rhode Island gubernatorial election
- 1992 United States gubernatorial elections
- 1992 Utah gubernatorial election
- 1992 Vermont gubernatorial election
- 1992 Washington gubernatorial election
- 1992 West Virginia gubernatorial election

==== United States House of Representatives ====
- 1992 United States House of Representatives elections
- 1992 United States House of Representatives election in Alaska
- 1992 United States House of Representatives elections in California
- 1992 United States House of Representatives election in Delaware
- 1992 United States House of Representatives elections in New York
- 1992 United States House of Representatives election in North Dakota
- 1992 United States House of Representatives elections in Texas
- 1992 United States House of Representatives election in Vermont
- 1992 United States House of Representatives election in Wyoming

==== United States mayoral elections ====
- 1992 Baton Rouge mayoral election
- 1992 Irvine mayoral election
- 1992 Jersey City special mayoral election
- 1992 Milwaukee mayoral election
- 1992 Orlando mayoral election
- 1992 Portland, Oregon mayoral election
- 1992 San Diego mayoral election

== Oceania ==
- 1992 Fijian general election
- 1992 Nauruan parliamentary election
- 1992 Niuean constitutional referendum
- 1992 Palauan general election
- 1992 Palauan constitutional referendum
- 1992 Papua New Guinean general election

=== Australia ===
- 1992 Arafura by-election
- 1992 Alexandra state by-election
- 1992 Australian Capital Territory election
- 1992 Davidson state by-election
- 1992 Gordon state by-election
- 1992 Kavel state by-election
- 1992 Ku-ring-gai state by-election
- 1992 Queensland state election
- 1992 Tasmanian state election
- 1992 The Entrance state by-election
- 1992 Victorian state election
- 1992 Western Australian daylight saving referendum
- 1992 Wills by-election

=== Hawaii ===
- United States Senate election in Hawaii, 1992

== South America ==
- 1992 Ecuadorian general election
- 1992 Guyanese general election
- 1992 Peruvian Democratic Constituent Congress election
