= 1992 United Kingdom general election in Northern Ireland =

- 9 April 1992

All 17 Northern Ireland seats in the House of Commons
- Turnout: 69.8% (▲2.8 pp)
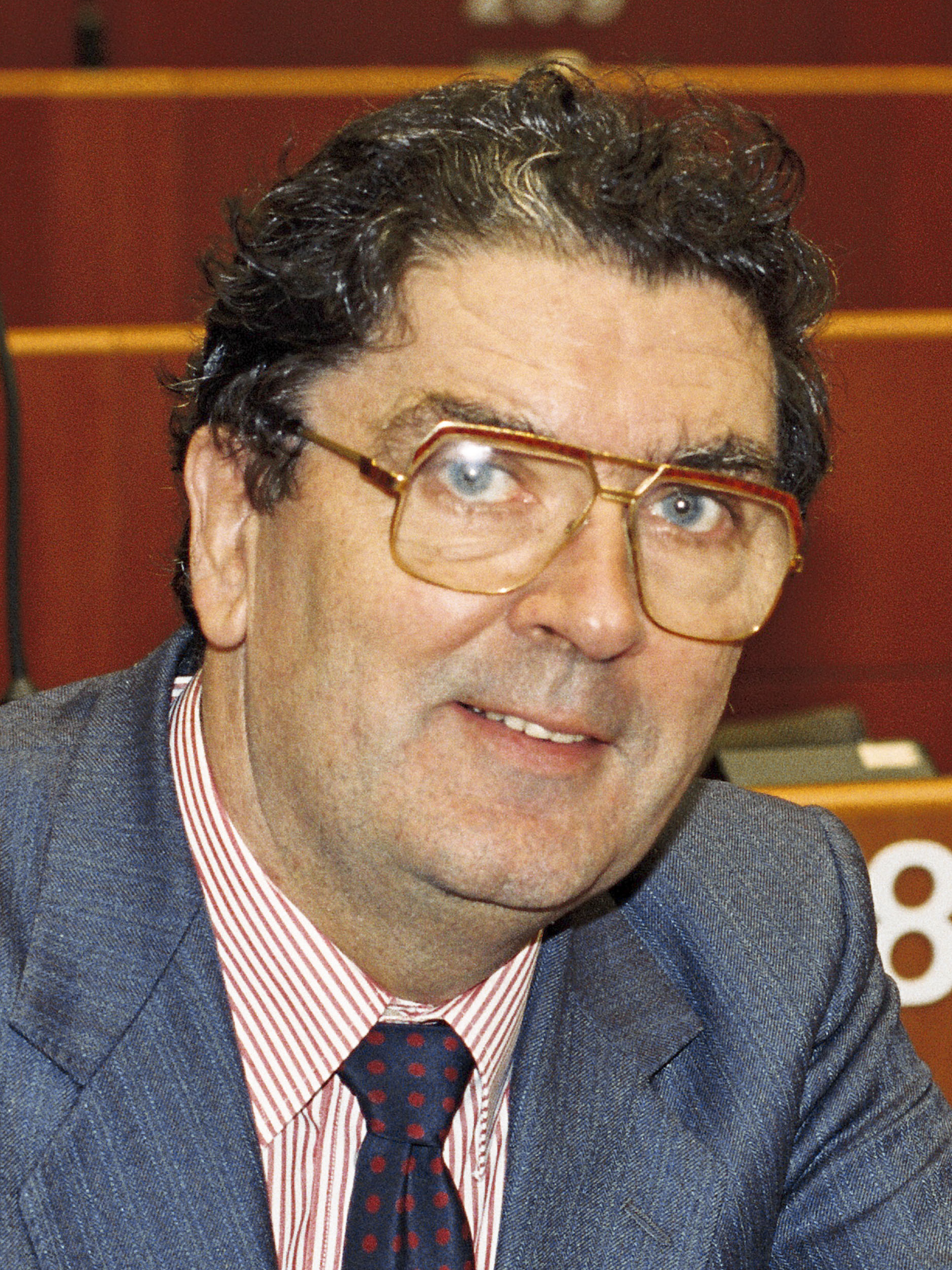

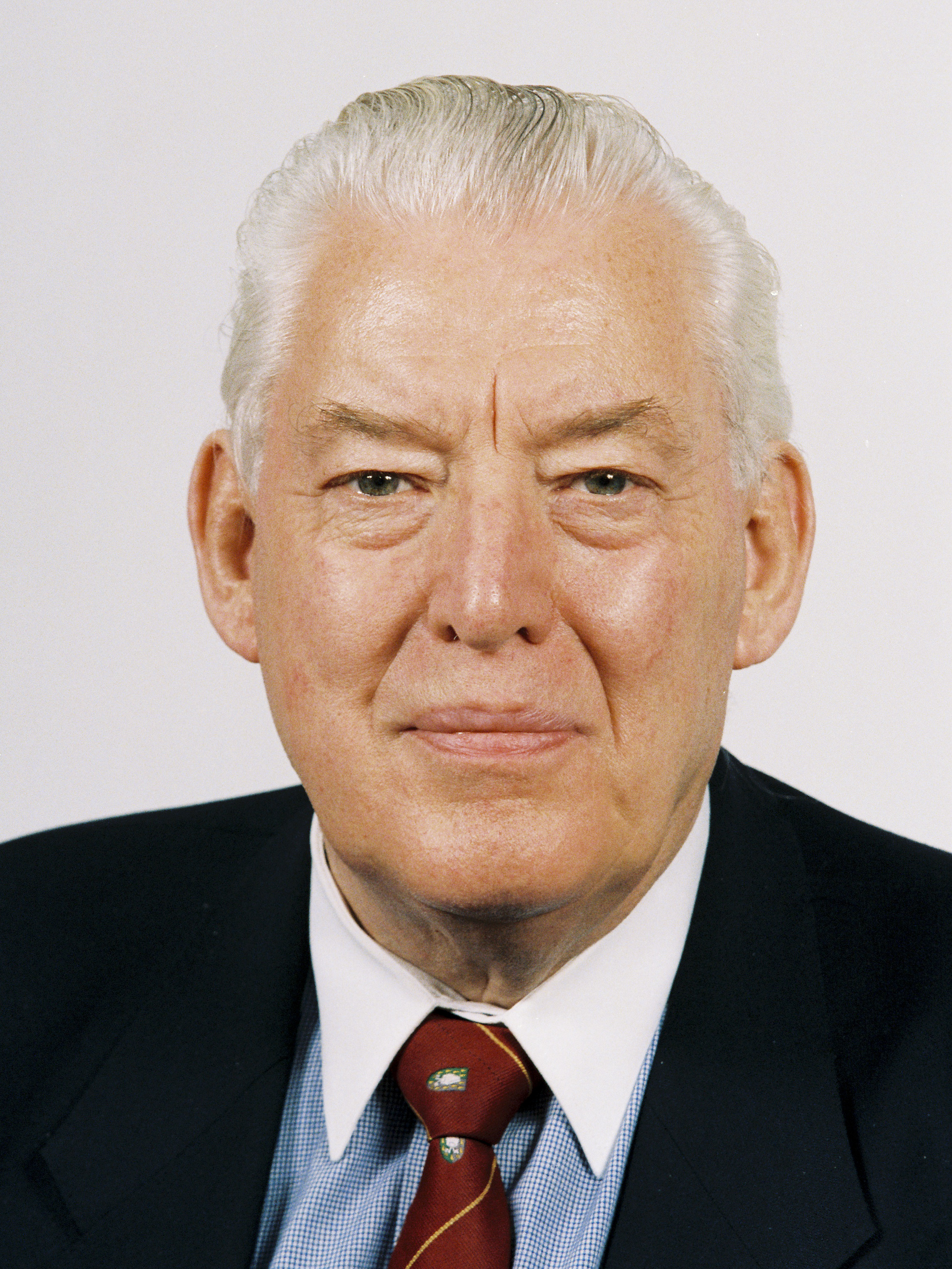
	First party	Second party
	UUP
Leader	James Molyneaux	John Hume
Party	UUP	SDLP
Leader since	1979	6 May 1979
Leader's seat	Lagan Valley	Foyle
Last election	9 seats, 37.8%	3 seats, 21.1%
Seats won	9	4
Seat change	Steady	▲1
Popular vote	271,049	184,445
Percentage	34.5%	23.5%
Swing	▼2.3 pp	▲2.4 pp
	Third party	Fourth party
		UPUP
Leader	Ian Paisley	James Kilfedder
Party	DUP	UPUP
Leader since	1971	1980
Leader's seat	North Antrim	North Down
Last election	3 seats, 11.7%	1 seat, 2.5%
Seats won	3	1
Seat change	Steady	Steady
Popular vote	103,039	19,305
Percentage	13.1%	2.5%
Swing	▲1.4 pp	Steady

On 9 April 1992, the 1992 United Kingdom general election was held in Northern Ireland, to elect all 651 members of the House of Commons, including the 17 Northern Ireland seats. 1,124,900 people were eligible to vote, up 34,511 from the 1987 general election. 70.02% of eligible voters turned out (when including spoiled ballots), down 2.6 percentage points from the last general election.

The Conservative Party, now led by John Major as prime minister, won another term in government. In Northern Ireland, the only change was between the nationalist parties, with Sinn Féin losing its seat in Belfast West to the SDLP. The SDLP's four seats was and still is its best-ever result.

== Candidates ==
Below is a table summarising the candidates of the 1992 general election in Northern Ireland.

Affiliation	Candidates
Alliance Party of Northern Ireland	16
Sinn Féin	14
Social Democratic and Labour Party	13
Ulster Unionist Party	13
Northern Ireland Conservatives	11
Natural Law Party	9
Workers' Party	8
Democratic Unionist Party	7
Labour and Trade Union Group	2 (Note: The candidates that stood were Peter Hadden in Belfast South and Harry Hutchinson in Mid Ulster.)
New Agenda	2 (Note: The candidates that stood were Seamus Lynch in Belfast North and Gerry Cullen in Fermanagh and South Tyrone.)
Ulster Popular Unionist Party	1 (Note: Candidate and leader James Kilfedder in North Down.)
Independent Unionist	1 (Note: Candidate Dorothy Dunlop stood in Belfast East.)
Official Monster Raving Loony Party	1 (Note: Candidate Denis Martin stood in South Antrim.)
Independent	1 (Note: Candidate Johnny McLaughlin stood in Mid Ulster.)
Independent Progressive Socialist	1 (Note: Candidate David Kettyles stood in Fermanagh and South Tyrone.)
Total	100

== Results ==
Party	Seats					Aggregate votes		
Party	Total	Gains	Losses	Net	Of all (%)	Total	Of all (%)	Change (%)
UUP	9	0	0	Steady	52.9	271,049	34.5	▼2.3
SDLP	4	1	0	▲1	23.5	184,445	23.5	▲2.4
DUP	3	0	0	Steady	17.6	103,039	13.1	▲1.4
Sinn Féin	0	0	1	▼1	—	78,291	10.0	▼1.5
Alliance	0	0	0	Steady	—	68,665	8.7	▼1.3
NI Conservatives	0	New			—	44,608	5.7	New
UPUP	1	0	0	Steady	5.9	19,305	2.5	Steady
Workers' Party	0	0	0	Steady	—	4,359	0.6	▼2.0
Ind. Unionist	0	Did not stand in 1987			—	2,256	0.3	—N/a
Natural Law	0	New			—	2,147	0.3	New
New Agenda	0	Did not stand in 1987			—	2,133	0.3	—N/a
Independent	0	Did not stand in 1987			—	1,996	0.3	—N/a
Labour and Trade Union	0	Did not stand in 1987			—	1,264	0.2	—N/a
Independent Progressive Socialist	0	New			—	1,094	0.1	New
Monster Raving Loony	0	New			—	442	0.0	New
Blank and invalid votes						4,736	—	—
Total	17			0	100.0	785,093 (Note: All valid votes excluding spoiled votes.)	100.0	0.0
Registered voters, and turnout						1,124,900	69.8	▲2.8

Popular vote
UUP	34.5%
SDLP	23.5%
DUP	13.1%
Sinn Féin	10.0%
APNI	8.7%
NI Conservative	5.7%
UPUP	2.5%
NLP	0.3%
Other	1.7%

Parliamentary seats
UUP	52.9%
SDLP	23.5%
DUP	17.6%
UPUP	5.9%

== MPs elected ==
Constituency	Party	MP
East Antrim	UUP	Roy Beggs
North Antrim	DUP	Ian Paisley
South Antrim	UUP	Clifford Forsythe
Belfast East	DUP	Peter Robinson
Belfast North	UUP	Cecil Walker
Belfast South	UUP	Martin Smyth
Belfast West	SDLP	Joe Hendron
North Down	UPUP	Jim Kilfedder
South Down	SDLP	Eddie McGrady
Fermanagh and South Tyrone	UUP	Ken Maginnis
Foyle	SDLP	John Hume
Lagan Valley	UUP	James Molyneaux
East Londonderry	UUP	William Ross
Mid Ulster	DUP	William McCrea
Newry and Armagh	SDLP	Seamus Mallon
Strangford	UUP	John Taylor
Upper Bann	UUP	David Trimble

=== By-elections ===
Constituency	Date	Incumbent	Party	Winner	Party	Cause
North Down	15 June 1995	Jim Kilfedder	UPUP	Robert McCartney	UK Unionist	Death

== See also ==
- 1992 United Kingdom general election in England
- 1992 United Kingdom general election in Scotland
- 1992 United Kingdom general election in Wales
