= 1994 United States Virgin Islands gambling referendum =

Ballot measure in the US Virgin Islands

A referendum on legalizing casino gambling was held in the United States Virgin Islands in November 1994, alongside general elections. It was a repeat of the 1992 referendum, which saw the proposal rejected by a narrow margin. This time the proposal was rejected in St Thomas and St John but approved in St Croix.

== Results ==
=== St Croix ===
| Choice | Votes | % |
|---|---|---|
| For | | 58 |
| Against | | 42 |
| Invalid/blank votes | | – |
| Total | | 100 |
| Registered voters/turnout | | |
Source: Pattullo

== Aftermath ==
Following the referendum, the Legislature voted to legalized casino gambling in St Croix by a vote of 9–6 on 27 April 1995. Governor Roy Schneider signed the bill into law on 8 May.
