= War of Jennifer's Ear =

1992 controversy in British politics

The War of Jennifer's Ear is the name given to a 1992 controversy in United Kingdom politics, between the opposition Labour Party and the governing Conservative Party. The name is an allusion to the War of Jenkins' Ear, an actual armed conflict of the 18th century.

== Election broadcast ==
In the midst of the 1992 general election campaign, on 24 March, Labour ran a party political broadcast about a five-year-old girl with glue ear who waited a year for the simple operation to insert vents. This case was contrasted with the case of a girl a with a similar condition who was able to afford private treatment – of the kind that had been granted tax breaks by the Conservatives – and was able to resolve her problem quickly. The party highlighted the alleged mismanagement and underfunding of the National Health Service (NHS) under the Conservative government. Labour leader Neil Kinnock employed the slogan: "If you want to vote Conservative, don't fall ill".

Under British election regulations, such broadcasts are rationed by formula among main parties, and terrestrial broadcasters are obliged to run them on set days, in peak time schedules. Each broadcast therefore has more impact on political debate than in unregulated systems.

The story of the broadcast was described by one press officer – Julie Hall, Neil Kinnock's press secretary, as based on an actual case. In fact while a particular case had been the starting point of the creative team that had produced the broadcast – working from a letter by the girl's parent to Robin Cook, the shadow health secretary, they denied it was meant to be a recounting of her case.

Conflicting accounts of the details of the case quickly surfaced, with the supposed inspiration for the ad being then-five-year old Jennifer Bennett. Allegedly, the grandfather of the girl in question was a Conservative MP who informed the party of Labour's plans, allowing it to prepare an investigative response ahead of time. The mass circulation tabloid, The Sun, ran the story: "If Kinnock will tell lies about a sick little girl, will he ever tell the truth about anything?". This was one of several anti-Kinnock headlines that the tabloid ran in the run-up to the 1992 general election, and it has often been said that The Sun's unshakeable support for the Tories and opposition to Labour helped win the election for the Tories. The story though was broken by Peter Hitchens, then of the Daily Express.

== Aftermath ==
In subsequent press discussion, Labour's point about healthcare was overshadowed by debate about the ethics of involving a young girl in national politics, and over which side made her identity public. The view inside the Labour Party was, however, that the huge volume of coverage the story generated in the UK's local and regional media did the party tremendous good. However, as told by Philip Gould the controversy made the party back off the issue of health at a national level.

The Conservative Party went on to win the 1992 election with a narrow majority of 21 seats. Labour leader Neil Kinnock resigned three days afterwards. Jennifer's father, John Bennett, went on to become a critic of the health provision achieved by Tony Blair's Labour government.

== Other 'health war' controversies ==
The War of Jennifer's Ear now serves as the type specimen in British political discussions, for political rhetoric that leans on specific cases, as opposed to broad statistics, particularly in the context of debates over healthcare. Such foundations are acknowledged to be hazardous for politicians to employ in any decisive argument. The tactic has nonetheless been repeated on several occasions, at each of which headline writers attempt to formulate a new version of the 'war of' label:

- Mavis Skeet (2000) – A cancer patient died in Leeds after four times having surgery postponed by a lack of available intensive care beds. The scandal was raised by a newspaper, and resulted in significant government reviews.
- Rose Addis (2002) – Conservative leader Iain Duncan Smith criticised the government's record by illustrating the case of a 94-year-old woman who he claimed had been neglected in a hospital. The hospital's Medical Director, Dr Malone-Lee pointed out that she had been seen, but that she had "a particular reservation about some of the nurses" and refused to let them attend to her. This was interpreted as a suggestion that Addis' objections had been racially based, which the hospital later made clear was not the case.
- Anonymous (2004) – Conservative leader Michael Howard complained that a Folkestone constituent of his was told to wait 20 months for vital radiotherapy. The issue cooled off after he discovered that a clerical error had occurred – the wait was in fact scheduled to be 20 weeks.
- Margaret Dixon (2005) – Conservative leader Michael Howard attempted to show, in the run-up to the 2005 general election, that the incumbent Labour Party was failing the NHS. Dixon, from Warrington, was cited to illustrate the increase in cancelled operations, a statistic that was dismissed as the consequence of increases in overall operations performed.
- "Jack" (2019) - Conservative Prime Minister Boris Johnson refused to look at a photograph of a boy who allegedly had to sleep on the floor whilst waiting to be seen at a Leeds hospital. An ITV news reporter attempted to show Johnson the picture on his phone, but he refused to look, before taking the device and putting it in his pocket. The boy was being assessed for suspected pneumonia.
