= 1992 Alsace regional election =

A regional election took place in Alsace on March 22, 1992, along with all other regions.

Party	Votes	%	Seats
UDF	137,065	20.03%	
RPR	89,358	13.06%	
Miscellaneous Right	40,696	5.95%	
UPF	267,119	39.03%	20
The Greens	86,077	12.58%	6
GE	28,958	4.23%	3
Greens-GE	115,035	16.81%	9
PS	84,245	12.31%	6
PCF	11,138	1.63%	0
Presidential Majority	6,540	0.96%	0
Presidential Majority	101,923	14.89%	6
FN	117,441	17.16%	9
Alsace d'Abord	41,397	6.05%	2
Women of Alsace	17,447	2.55%	1
Far-left	16,608	2.43%	0
Autonomous Alsatian List	7,405	1.08%	0
Total	684,375	100.00%	47

== Sources ==
Le Figaro Elections base
