= 1992 Brittany regional election =

A regional election took place in Brittany on March 22, 1992, along with all other regions.

Party	%	Seats
RPR-UDF	38.20%	37
Miscellaneous Right	4.40%	4
UPF	42.6%	41
PS-PCF-PRG-Les Verts	20.8%	19
PCF	5.70%	3
Left	26.5%	22
The Greens	8.70%	6
GE	6.80%	6
Greens-GE	15.50%	12
FN	8.80%	7
LCR-LO	2.20%	0
Others	4.30%	1
Total	100.00%	83
