= The Journey (party political broadcast) =

1992 party political broadcast featuring John Major

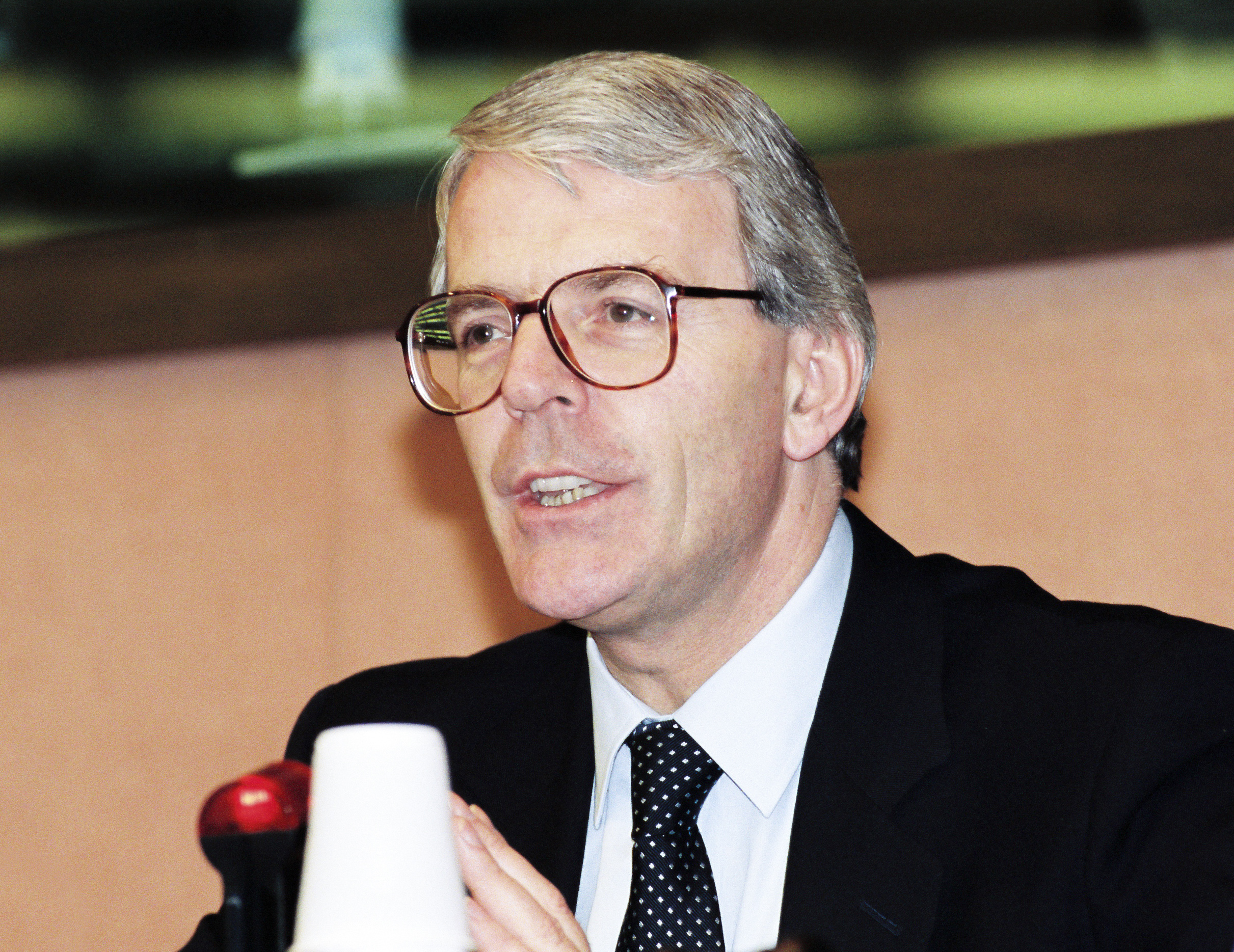
Major in 1992

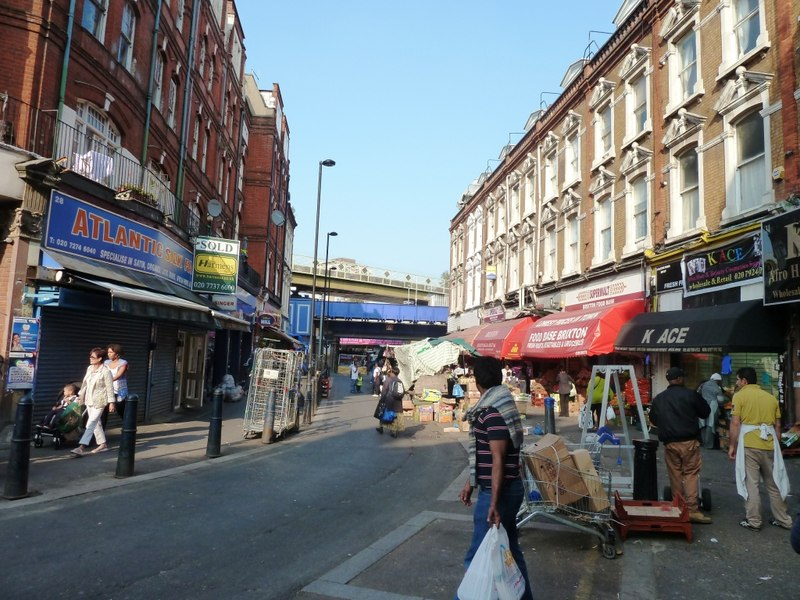
Electric Avenue in Brixton

The Journey — A Film of John Major is a 1992 film about the British Prime Minister John Major. It was created for a party political broadcast during the 1992 United Kingdom general election. It was directed by John Schlesinger.

== Background ==
The film was popularly known as John Major: The Movie. It was perceived as a response to the 1987 party political broadcast Kinnock about Neil Kinnock, directed by Hugh Hudson, that had been produced for the 1987 United Kingdom general election. Major had higher individual approval ratings than the Conservative Party which he led and was perceived as having a 'classless' background. Major himself was uncomfortable with the notion of creating a "cult of personality" around himself in the campaign. The creation of the film was inspired by Major's speech to the 1991 Conservative Party Conference where he spoke of his personal journey from the streets of Brixton to the premiership in 10 Downing Street.

The film was broadcast on the night of the launch of the Conservative manifesto.

== Production ==
The film cost £250,000 to make (equivalent to £551,643 in 2025). It was directed by John Schlesinger. Major did not enjoy making the film and wrote in his autobiography that he was embarrassed by it. He repeatedly requested cuts to the film to remove references to his family and wanted to be depicted alone in the film.

== Content ==
The Prime Minister of the United Kingdom, John Major, is driven around the Brixton district of South London and is interviewed about the childhood he spent there. He is shown buying tomatoes and kippers in a market. He talks about early campaign speeches in Brixton Market and Brixton Road and talks about his house in Coldharbour Lane where he played cricket in the street. While driving down Burton Road, Major exclaims with joy "Now, is it still there? It is! It is! It's still there! It's hardly changed!" upon seeing the location of his former downstairs flat. He also recalls his wedding to Norma at St Matthew's Church in Brixton (part of which was being used as a nightclub at the time of filming) and his parents' rewarding experiences of the National Health Service and the Patient's Charter introduced under his government. Politically, Major speaks of unemployment and his cure of economic growth for unemployment which involves the difficult combination of unpopular decisions and a competitive tax structure. He also recalls his entry to the House of Commons and is shown meeting global politicians and entering 10 Downing Street.

Major also said that people were "... entitled to their own views, their own instincts ... it's quite wrong to try to pigeonhole everybody... People are individuals, they have their own instincts, they have their own feelings. As a matter of privacy, I think that is predominantly for them". Parris described this as an "interesting, if oblique, remark" and assumed it was a "coded" support for sexual tolerance.

== Reception ==
Columnist Matthew Parris of The Times wrote that the film portrayed Major "as a less grey, more interesting man" and that it "[gave] him depth". It was launched with a screening at British Academy of Film and Television Arts (BAFTA). Major's political secretary Jonathan Hill said that Major "couldn't bear to look at it".

The film was described as "less glossy and glitzy" than the Kinnock film by Chris Patten, the Chairman of the Conservative Party.

The scene of Major expressing surprise that his old flat still existed was disliked by viewers who perceived it as inauthentic. Parris wrote that "So the prime minister had not checked up on this before arriving with full camera crew! We giggled. But, in my experience, the things that don't work on television (this bit doesn't) are the things which were not contrived. The impromptu needs rehearsal". The personal scenes were viewed less favourably than his discussions of his personal political philosophies. In a poll of 100 floating voters in a marginal Midlands constituency the film scored the lowest of the party political broadcasts that week compared to the Labour and Liberal Democrats broadcasts. Major was perceived as "a wet" and "too soft" with the 'wimp' factor.

The Conservative Party under Major subsequently won a record 14 million votes in the 1992 election, resulting in a majority of 21 seats.
