= 1992 Civic Democratic Party leadership election =

Czechoslovak political party election

- 7 November 1992
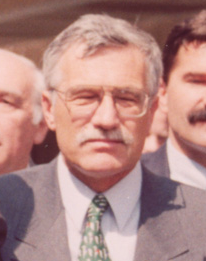
Candidate	Václav Klaus
Electoral vote	333
Percentage	97.65%
Leader of ODS before election
Václav Klaus
Elected Leader of ODS
Václav Klaus

A leadership election for the Civic Democratic Party (ODS) was held on 7 November 1992 during the party's Congress in Prague. It was held prior to expected dissolution of Czechoslovakia and following to 1992 legislative election in which the Civic Democratic Party was victorious. The incumbent leader Václav Klaus was reelected as party's leader. Klaus was unopposed and received votes of 333 delegates while only 8 delegates voted against him.
