= Labour and Trade Union Group =

- Leader: Peter Hadden
- Founded: 1972
- Dissolved: 1996
- Preceded by: Northern Ireland Labour Party
- Ideology: Trotskyism; Marxism
- Political position: Far-left

The Labour and Trade Union Group was an organisation for supporters of the Militant tendency in Northern Ireland.

The group originated in the Northern Ireland Labour Party (NILP), but developed a separate existence as that organisation declined in support, and was expelled from the NILP in 1977. It was initially named the "Labour and Trade Union Coordinating Committee", and aimed to include other left-wingers. It campaigned for a Conference of Labour, at which trade unions, socialist groups and community campaigns could agree on a coordinated approach to labour movement politics, but no such conference was ever held.

The group failed to win any support and was largely considered a fringe party. It stood Muriel Tang in the 1983 United Kingdom general election in Belfast East, where she took 1.5% of the vote. It then stood three candidates for Belfast City Council at the 1985 Northern Ireland local elections, none of whom were elected. At the 1992 general election, it stood two candidates, including leader Peter Hadden, who took 1,264 votes between them. By 1993, it was part of the all-Ireland Militant Labour. It joined the short-lived Labour coalition in 1996 before formally merging with Militant Labour to form the Socialist Party.
