= Peter Hadden =

Northern Irish politician (1950–2010)

Peter Hadden (19 February 1950 – 5 May 2010) was a leading member of the Socialist Party in Northern Ireland.

Born in Strabane, Hadden studied at the University of Sussex, where he joined the Trotskyist Militant tendency. He moved back to Belfast in 1971, where he became a full-time official for NIPSA, while organising a Trotskyist group within the Northern Ireland Labour Party (NILP). Hadden and his supporters were expelled from the NILP in 1977 and they instead founded the Labour and Trade Union Group to contest elections as an independent organisation.

From 1980, Hadden wrote extensively on socialism and The Troubles, with titles including Divide and Rule, Common History Common Struggle, Beyond the Troubles, Towards Division Not Peace and Troubled Times. He supported the majority during the split in Militant in the early 1990s, and as a result all the tendency's members in Northern Ireland followed him into Militant Labour.

The LTUG never enjoyed success at the polls and was considered a fringe party. Hadden stood for the Labour and Trade Union Group in Belfast South at the 1992 general election, taking 2.2% of the votes cast. During the campaign, he only narrowly escaped a bombing. At the 1993 Northern Ireland local elections, he stood in the Lagan Bank division of Belfast City Council as a Militant Labour candidate, but took only 142 votes. In 1996 his group was part of the Labour coalition. The list garnered 333 votes in Belfast South at the Northern Ireland Forum election 1996. He was placed sixth on the party's top-up list, but was not elected.

Militant Labour became the Socialist Party, and Hadden remained its leading figure in Northern Ireland until his death in 2010.
