= 1992 President of the Czech National Council election =

- 29–30 June 1992
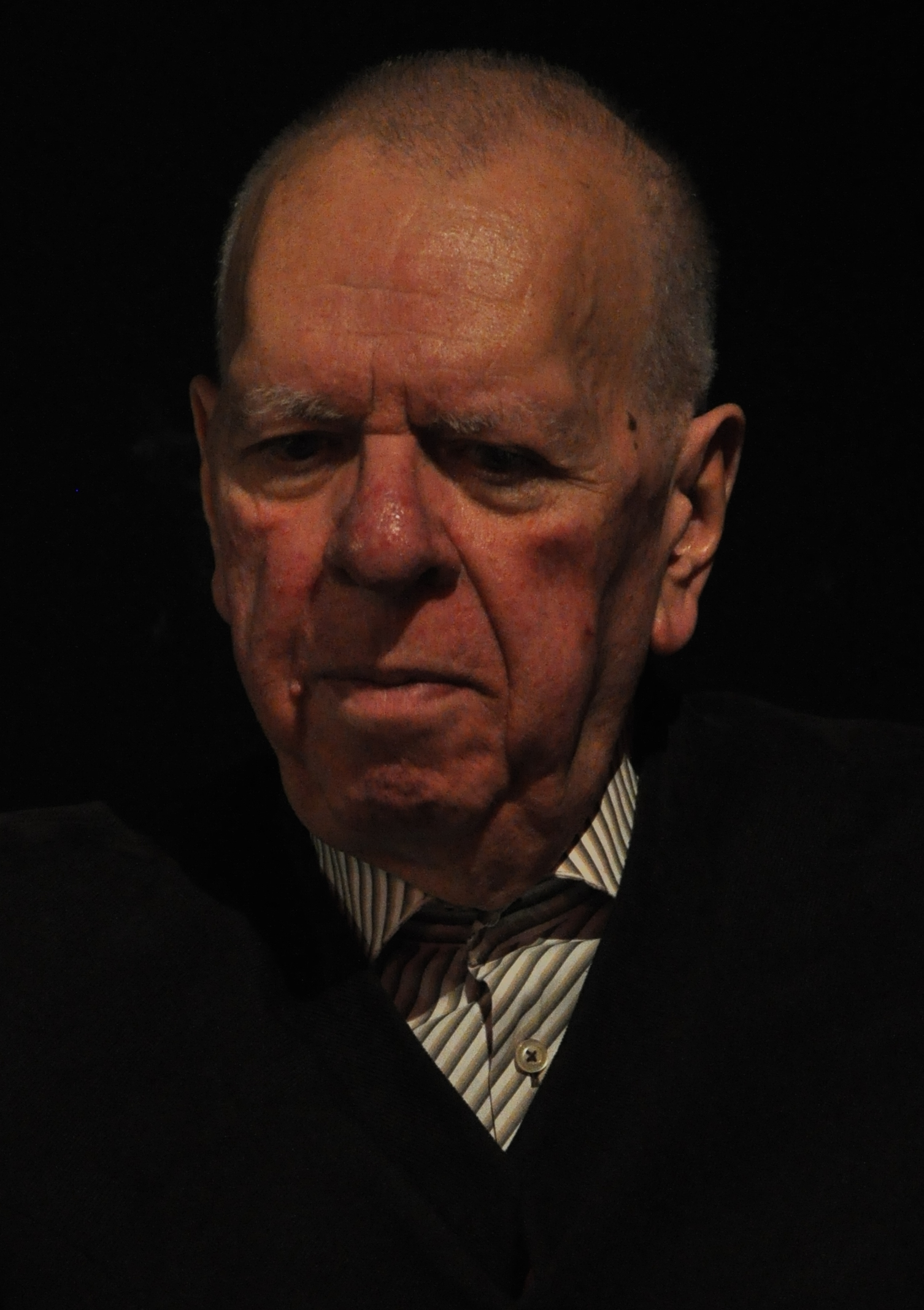
Candidate	Milan Uhde
Party	ODS
Popular vote	99
Percentage	50.77%
President before election
Dagmar Burešová
OH
Elected President
Milan Uhde
ODS

Election of the President of the Czech National Council was held on 29 and 30 June 1992. It was the last election of a president of the National Council but also the first election of a President of the Chamber of Deputies because Czech National Council was transformed into the Chamber of Deputies in January 1993.

== Background ==
The 1992 legislative election was held following split of Civic Forum. Civic Democratic Party emerged as the dominant party and won the election. New President of the Czech national Council had to be elected Civic Democrats nominated Milan Uhde.

== Voting ==
Uhde was the only candidate. He received nomination from other parties in coalition government - Christian and Democratic Union – Czechoslovak People's Party and Civic Democratic Alliance. The first round was held on 29 June 1992. All 200 MPs were present and Uhde needed 101 votes. 155 valid votes were submitted while 3 votes were invalid. 38 votes weren't submitted. Uhde received 89 votes while 69 MPs voted against. Uhde wasn't elected.

Second round was held on 30 June 1992. 195 MPs were present. Uhde needed to get 98 votes. 185 of them voted. Uhde received 99 votes while 86 voted against. 10 votes were invalid. Uhde received enough votes and was elected.

== Aftermath ==
Uhde became the last President of the Czech National Council before it transformed into the Chamber of Deputies. Uhde then became the first President of the Chamber. He remained in the position until 1996 when he was replaced by Miloš Zeman.
