= 1992 United Kingdom general election in Wales =

- 9 April 1992

All 38 Welsh seats to the House of Commons
- Turnout: 79.7% (▲0.8 pp)
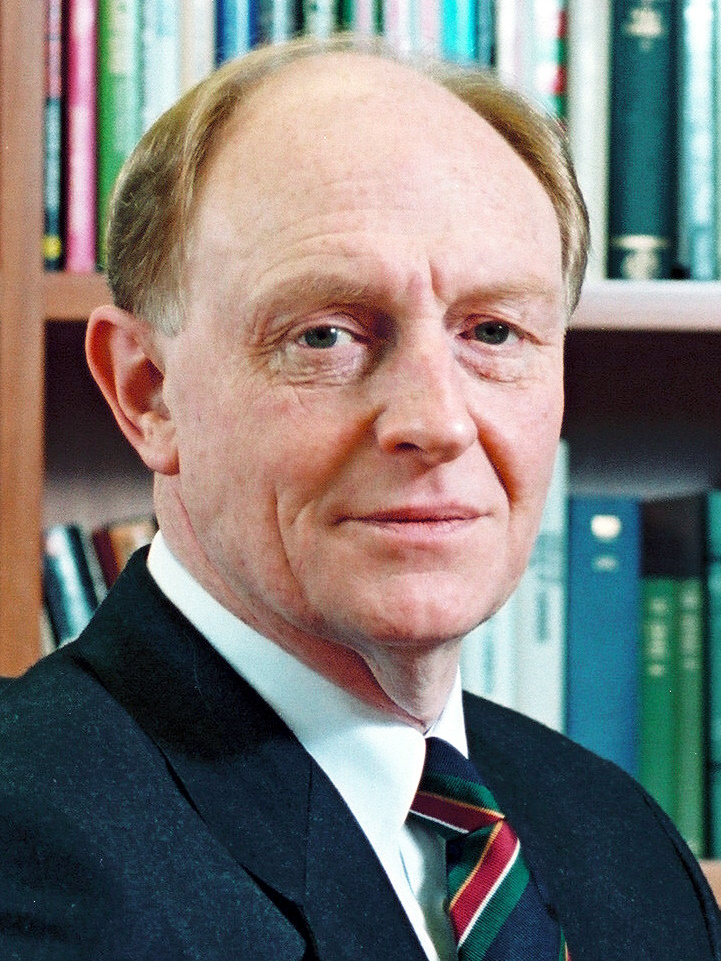

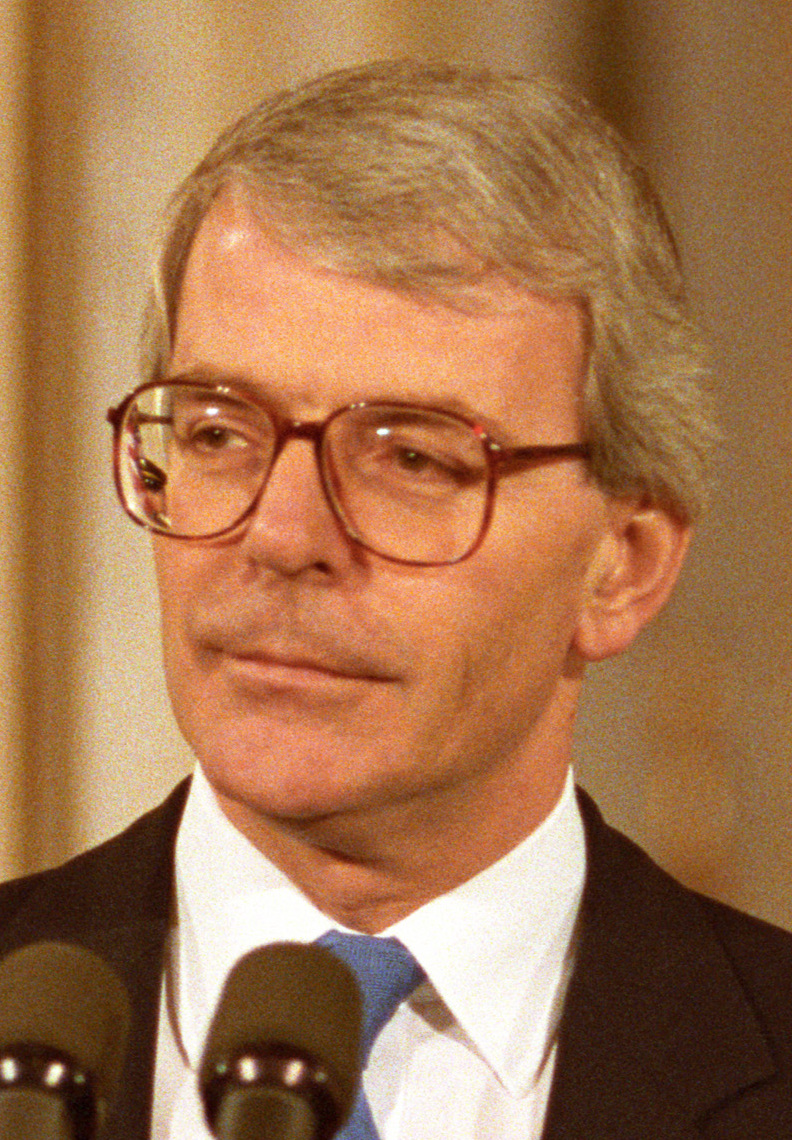

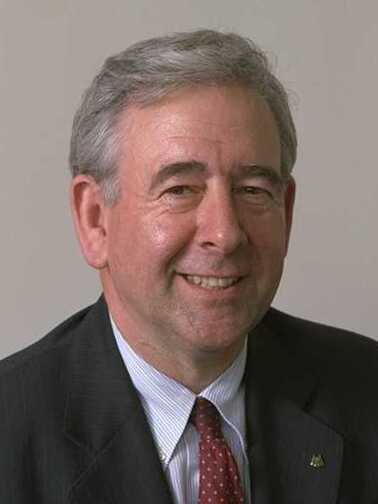

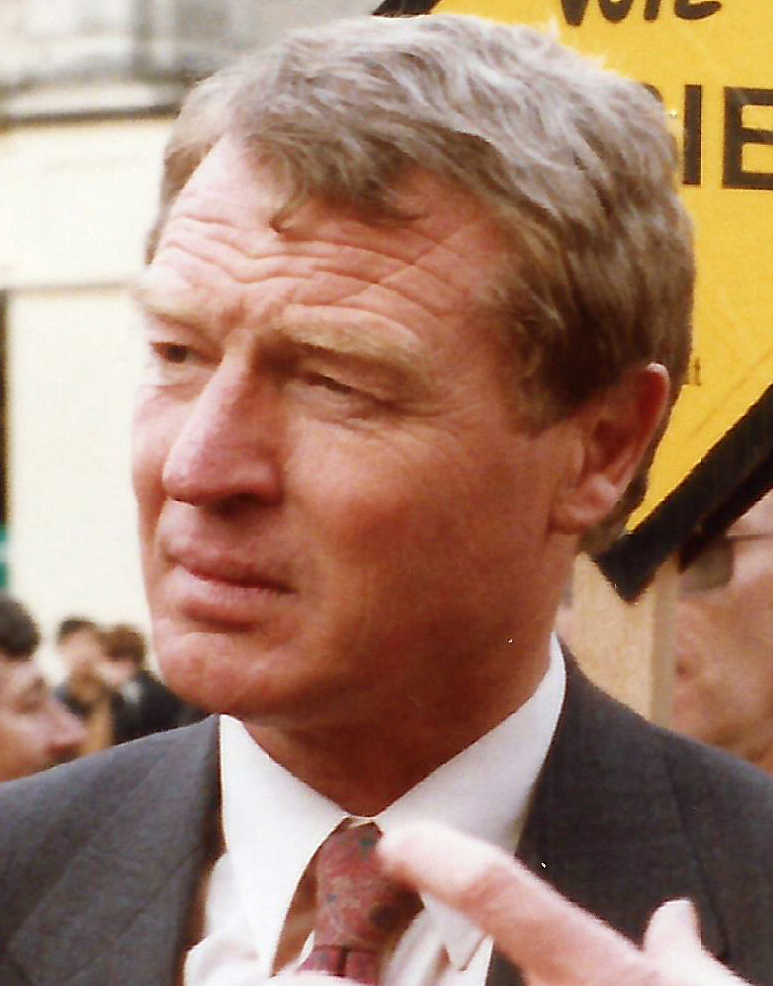
	First party	Second party
Leader	Neil Kinnock	John Major
Party	Labour	Conservative
Leader since	2 October 1983	28 November 1990
Leader's seat	Islwyn	Huntingdon
Last election	24 seats, 45.1%	8 seats, 29.5%
Seats won	27	6
Seat change	▲3	▼2
Popular vote	865,663	499,677
Percentage	49.5%	28.6%
Swing	▲4.4 pp	▼0.9 pp
	Third party	Fourth party
Leader	Dafydd Wigley	Paddy Ashdown
Party	Plaid Cymru	Liberal Democrats
Leader since	1991	16 July 1988
Leader's seat	Caernarfon	Yeovil
Last election	3 seats, 7.3%	3 seats, 17.9% (Note: Figure is the combined result of the SDP-Liberal Alliance parties - the Liberal Party and Social Democratic Party - which formed the Liberal Democrats.)
Seats won	4	1
Seat change	▲1	▼2
Popular vote	156,747	217,457
Percentage	9.0%	12.4%
Swing	▲1.7 pp	▼5.5 pp

On Thursday 9 April 1992, the 1992 United Kingdom general election was held in Wales, to elect all 651 members of the House of Commons, with 38 constituencies being in Wales.

The Labour Party again won a decisive majority of Welsh MPs, gaining three seats for a total of 27 out of 38. The Conservatives lost two Welsh MPs, Plaid Cymru gained one and the Liberal Democrats lost two of their three Welsh MPs.

Despite the Labour party winning the most votes in Wales, the Conservatives won across the UK.

However, due to strong Conservative results in England and Scotland, the Conservative result in Wales was enough to allow the party to form a majority government for a fourth term.

== Candidates ==
Below is a table summarising the candidates of the 1992 general election in Wales.

Affiliation	Candidates
Labour Party	38
Conservative and Unionist Party	38
Liberal Democrats	38
Plaid Cymru	35
Green Party of England and Wales	14 (Note: Includes 3 candidates that stood as Plaid Cymru-Green candidates.)
Natural Law Party	9
British National Party	1 (Note: Candidate John Morse stood in Cardiff North.)
Anti-Federalist League	1 (Note: Candidate R. M. Stoddart stood in Pembrokeshire.)
Independent	1 (Note: Candidate John Cooksey stood in Alyn and Deeside.)
Communist Party of Great Britain (PCC)	1 (Note: Candidate Mark Fischer stood in Rhondda.)
Independent Conservative	1 (Note: Candidate Owen Wainwright stood in Conwy.)
Official Monster Raving Loony Party	1 (Note: Candidate David Sutch stood in Islwyn.)
Real Bean Party	1 (Note: Candidate Captain Beany stood in Aberavon.)
Raving Loony Green Giant Party	1 (Note: Candidate Gerry P. Egan stood in Gower.)
Total	180

== Results ==
Below is a table summarising the results of the 1992 general election in Wales.

Party	Seats					Aggregate Votes		
Party	Total	Gains	Losses	Net	Of total (%)	Total	Of total (%)	Change (%)
Labour	27	3	0	▲3	71.1	865,663	49.5	▲4.4
Conservative	6	1	3	▼2	15.8	499,677	28.6	▼0.9
Liberal Democrats	1	0	2	▼2	2.6	217,457	12.4	▼5.5
Plaid Cymru	4	1	0	▲1	10.5	154,947	9.0	▲1.7
Green	0	0	0	Steady	—	7,073	0.4	▲0.3
Natural Law	0	New			—	1,231	0.1	New
Real Bean	0	New			—	707	0.0	New
Ind. Conservative	0	Did not stand in 1987			—	637	0.0	—N/a
Monster Raving Loony	0	New			—	547	0.0	New
Communist (PCC)	0	New			—	245	0.0	New
Independent	0	Did not stand in 1987			—	200	0.0	—N/a
Anti-Federalist League	0	New			—	158	0.0	New
BNP	0	Did not stand in 1987			—	121	0.0	—N/a
Raving Loony Green Giant	0	New			—	114	0.0	New
Total	38			0	100.0	1,748,777	100.0	0.0
Registered voters, and turnout							79.7	▲0.8

Popular vote
Labour	49.5%
Conservative	28.6%
Liberal Democrats	12.4%
Plaid Cymru	9.0%
Green	0.4%
Other	0.1%

Parliament seats
Labour	71.1%
Conservative	15.8%
Plaid Cymru	10.5%
Liberal Democrats	2.6%

== See also ==
- 1992 United Kingdom general election in England
- 1992 United Kingdom general election in Scotland
- 1992 United Kingdom general election in Northern Ireland
- List of MPs for constituencies in Wales (1992–1997)
- List of United Kingdom Parliament constituencies (1983–1997) by region
