= 1992 United Kingdom general election in England =

- 9 April 1992

All 524 English seats to the House of Commons
- Turnout: 78.0% (▲2.6 pp)
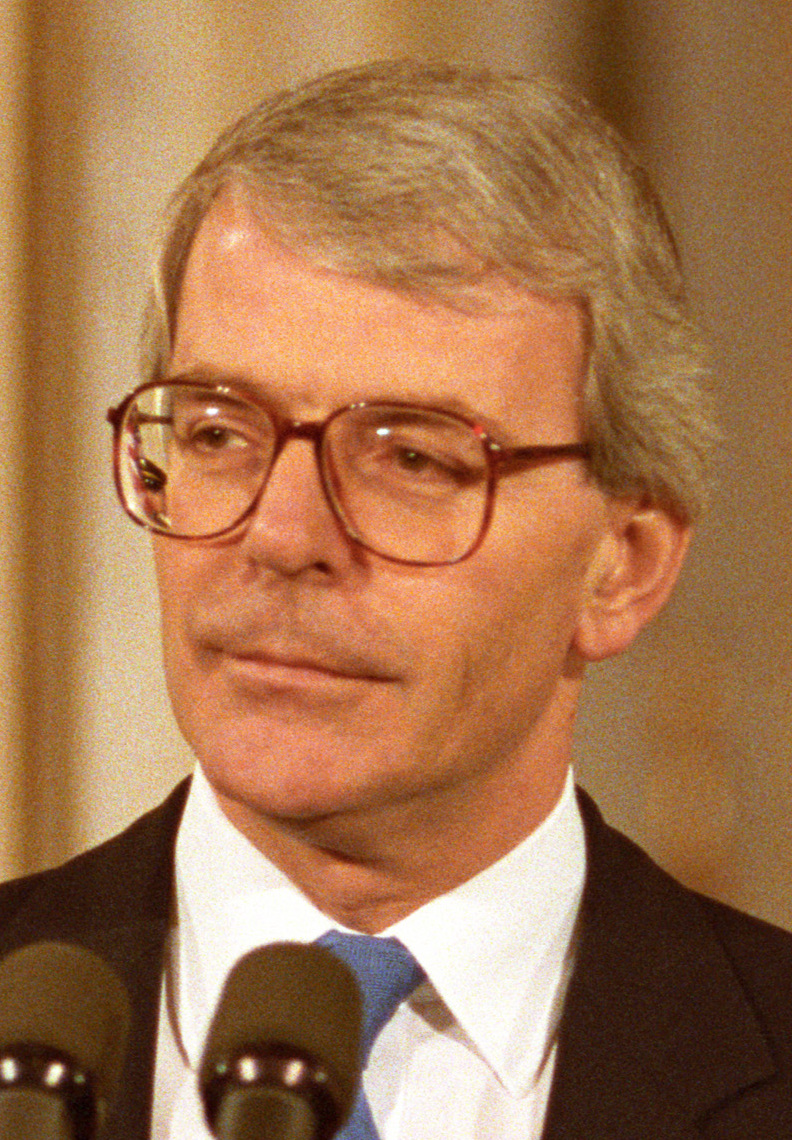

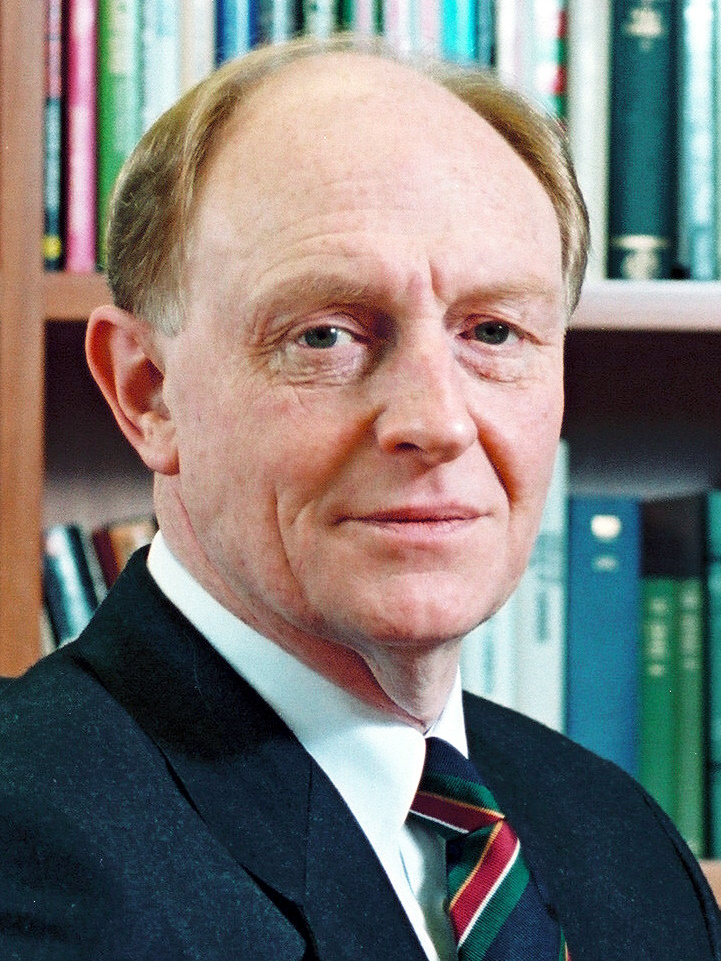

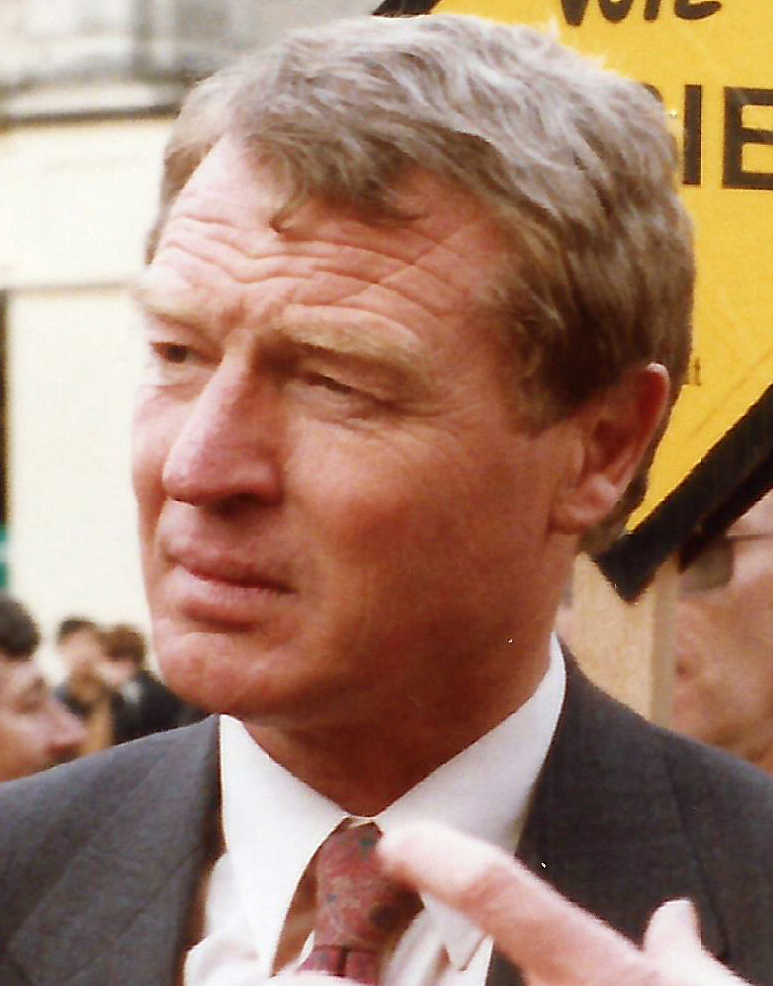
	First party	Second party	Third party
Leader	John Major	Neil Kinnock	Paddy Ashdown
Party	Conservative	Labour	Liberal Democrats
Leader since	28 November 1990	2 October 1983	16 July 1988
Leader's seat	Huntingdon	Islwyn	Yeovil
Last election	358 seats, 46.3%	155 seats, 29.5%	10 seats, 23.8% (Note: Figure is the combined result of the SDP-Liberal Alliance parties - the Liberal Party and Social Democratic Party - which formed the Liberal Democrats.)
Seats won	319	195	10
Seat change	▼39	▲40	Steady
Popular vote	12,796,772	9,551,910	5,398,293
Percentage	45.5%	33.9%	19.2%
Swing	▼0.8 pp	▲4.4 pp	▼4.6 pp

On Thursday 9 April 1992, the 1992 United Kingdom general election was held in England, to elect all 651 members of the House of Commons, with 524 constituencies being in England.

== Candidates ==
Below is a table summarising the candidates of the 1992 general election in England, showing parties that stood 10 or more candidates each.

Affiliation	Candidates
Conservative and Unionist Party	524
Labour Party	524
Liberal Democrats	522
Natural Law Party	272
Green Party of England and Wales	223
Liberal Party	68
Independent	46
Official Monster Raving Loony Party	21
Anti-Federalist League	16
National Front	14
Independent Conservative	13
British National Party	10
Other	75
Total	2,328

== Analysis ==
=== Conservative Party ===
John Major's Conservative Party won a decisive majority of English seats for the fourth successive election, although the Labour Party made substantial gains. Together with Conservative seats in Scotland and Wales, this gave the Conservatives an overall majority in the House of Commons of 21 seats. This was a significant reduction from the Conservative majority of 102 seats in the 1987 general election.

Although the party won the election, the Conservatives lost notable members of Parliament in England. Chris Patten, the then Chairman of the Conservative Party, lost his seat of Bath, which he had held the seat since 1979, to the Liberal Democrats. He was later appointed Governor of Hong Kong. Lynda Chalker also lost her seat of Wallasey, which she had held since the February 1974 general election. Francis Maude lost his seat of North Warwickshire and Bedworth to Mike O'Brien, though returned at the next election.

Former Conservative leader and Prime Minister Margaret Thatcher did not re-contest her seat, along with former Chancellors of the Exchequer Geoffrey Howe and Nigel Lawson also not re-contesting. Norman Tebbit, and Speaker of the House of Commons Bernard Weatherill also did not re-contest their constituencies in England, leaving the House of Commons following the election. Future Conservative leader Iain Duncan Smith was elected to Parliament as the member of Parliament (MP) for Chingford and Woodford Green for the first time in this election. Betty Boothroyd, the re-elected MP for West Bromwich West, subsequently became Speaker of the House of Commons on 28 April 1992.

=== Labour Party ===
The Labour Party gained seat from the Conservatives and newly-formed Liberal Democrats, increasing its seat count by 40 seats. However, former Labour Party leader Michael Foot, former Chancellors of the Exchequer, Denis Healey and former Home Secretary Merlyn Rees did not re-contest their seats. Expelled Dave Nellist stood as an Independent Labour candidate in his seat of Coventry South East but was unsuccessful, with Labour retaining the seat under a new candidate.

=== Liberal Democrats ===
The newly-formed Liberal Democrats under leader Paddy Ashdown remained steady in terms of seat in England at this election. The party was formed by the merging of the Liberal Party and Social Democratic Party. The party retained the prior Liberal Party-held seats of Truro, Paddy Ashdown's seat of Yeovil, Southwark and Bermondsey, Berwick-upon-Tweed, Rochdale and Liverpool Mossley Hill. It won Bath, North Cornwall, North Devon and Cheltenham from the Conservatives. However, it lost the prior SDP-held Plymouth Devonport, Greenwich, Woolwich and Liberal-held Southport. Former Social Democratic Party leader David Owen after previously holding Plymouth.

However, from the merging of the parties came the formation of break-away parties, the Liberal Party and Social Democratic Party. The new Liberal Party stood a significant number of candidates in England at 68, compared to the Social Democratic Party's 6 candidates. Michael Meadowcroft, the leader of the new break-away Liberal Party saw the greatest success amongst its candidates in Leeds West, however was unsuccessful as was all other candidates. Furthermore, Rosie Barnes stood amongst several Independent Social Democrats in her seat of Greenwich, with John Cartwright in his seat of Woolwich. Neither were successful, but received significant proportions of the vote share. Other such Independent Social Democrats stood in Bristol North West and Hornchurch.

== Results ==
Party	Seats					Aggregate votes		
Party	Total	Gains	Losses	Net	Of all (%)	Total	Of all (%)	Change (%)
Conservative	319	1	40	▼39	60.9	12,796,772	45.5	▼0.8
Labour	195	40	0	▲40	37.2	9,551,910	33.9	▲4.4
Liberal Democrats	10	4	4	Steady	1.9	5,398,293	19.2	▼4.6
Green	0	0	0	Steady	—	156,463	0.6	▲0.3
Liberal	0	New			—	63,436	0.2	New
Natural Law	0	New			—	57,415	0.2	New
Ind. Social Democrat	0	Did not stand in 1987			—	29,781	0.1	—N/a
Independent Labour	0	0	0	Steady	—	18,702	0.1	▲0.1
Independent	0	0	0	Steady	—	17,014	0.1	▲0.1
Ind. Conservative	0	0	0	Steady	—	13,693	0.0	Steady
Monster Raving Loony	0	0	0	Steady	—	6,967	0.0	Steady
BNP	0	0	0	Steady	—	6,409	0.0	Steady
SDP	0	New			—	5,481	0.0	New
National Front	0	0	0	Steady	—	4,816	0.0	Steady
True Labour	0	New			—	4,665	0.0	New
Anti-Federalist League	0	New			—	4,225	0.0	New
Raving Loony Green Giant	0	New			—	2,348	0.0	New
Islamic Party	0	New			—	1,085	0.0	New
MB Independent	0	New			—	916	0.0	New
Revolutionary Communist	0	Did not stand in 1987			—	672	0.0	—N/a
Independent Nationalist	0	New			—	649	0.0	New
Epping Forest Residents	0	New			—	552	0.0	New
Feudal Party	0	0	0	Steady	—	410	0.0	Steady
Protestant Reformation	0	New			—	393	0.0	New
Pensioners' Party	0	New			—	391	0.0	New
Lodestar Party	0	New			—	334	0.0	New
Workers Revolutionary	0	0	0	Steady	—	330	0.0	Steady
Communist League	0	New			—	315	0.0	New
ICP	0	New			—	280	0.0	New
Rainbow Dream Ticket	0	0	0	Steady	—	266	0.0	Steady
Fancy Dress	0	0	0	Steady	—	262	0.0	Steady
Communist (PCC)	0	New			—	252	0.0	New
Christian Democrat	0	Did not stand in 1987			—	244	0.0	—N/a
The People's Choice!	0	New			—	239	0.0	New
Conservative Thatcherite	0	New			—	231	0.0	New
Funstermentalist	0	New			—	213	0.0	New
End Unemployment Vote Justice	0	New			—	212	0.0	New
Socialist (GB)	0	0	0	Steady	—	175	0.0	Steady
Chauvinist Raving Alliance	0	New			—	175	0.0	New
Ind. Socialist	0	New			—	174	0.0	New
British Independent	0	New			—	172	0.0	New
Freedom From British Rail	0	New			—	149	0.0	New
Fellowship	0	0	0	Steady	—	147	0.0	Steady
Corrective Party	0	New			—	140	0.0	New
Gremloids Party	0	0	0	Steady	—	107	0.0	Steady
Irish Freedom	0	New			—	107	0.0	New
Democratic Liberal and Conservative	0	New			—	103	0.0	New
Anglo-Saxon	0	New			—	98	0.0	New
Forward to Mars	0	New			—	91	0.0	New
Stuck-Off Doctors	0	New			—	87	0.0	New
Twenty First Century	0	New			—	75	0.0	New
Anti-Paddy Ashdown	0	New			—	70	0.0	New
Total	524			▲1	100.0	28,148,506	100.0	0.0
Registered voters, and turnout							78.0	▲2.6

Popular vote
Conservative	45.5%
Labour	33.9%
Liberal Democrats	19.2%
Green	0.6%
Natural Law	0.2%
Other	0.7%

Parliament seats
Conservative	60.9%
Labour	37.2%
Liberal Democrats	1.9%

== By region ==
Note: these results are based on the previously-used standard statistical regions, not the current regions of England established in 1994.

=== North ===
This region included Northumberland, County Durham, Tyne and Wear and constituencies in the defunct county of Cleveland in the current English region of North East England, as well as Cumbria.

Party	Seats					Aggregate Votes		
Party	Total	Gains	Losses	Net	Of all (%)	Total	Of all (%)	Change (%)
Labour	29	2	0	▲2	80.6	914,712	50.6	▲4.2
Conservative	6	0	2	▼2	16.7	603,893	33.4	▲1.1
Liberal Democrats	1	0	0	Steady	2.8	281,236	15.6	▼5.5
Others	0	0	0	Steady	0.0	8,704	0.5	▲0.2
Total	36			Steady		1,808,545		

=== Yorkshire and the Humber ===
Like the current statistical region, this region included North Yorkshire, West Yorkshire, South Yorkshire and the East Riding of Yorkshire, North Lincolnshire and North East Lincolnshire constituencies in Humberside.

Party	Seats					Aggregate Votes		
Party	Total	Gains	Losses	Net	Of all (%)	Total	Of all (%)	Change (%)
Labour	34	1	0	▲1	63.0	1,267,515	44.3	▲3.7
Conservative	20	0	1	▼1	37.0	1,084,242	37.9	▲0.5
Liberal Democrats	0	0	0	Steady	0.0	481,260	16.8	▼4.8
Others	0	0	0	Steady	0.0	25,240	0.9	▲0.6
Total	54			Steady		2,858,257		

=== East Midlands ===
Like the current statistical region, this region included Derbyshire, Lincolnshire (excluding North Lincolnshire and North East Lincolnshire), Northamptonshire, Nottinghamshire, Leicestershire and Rutland.

Party	Seats					Aggregate Votes		
Party	Total	Gains	Losses	Net	Of all (%)	Total	Of all (%)	Change (%)
Conservative	28	0	3	▼3	66.7	1,149,514	46.6	▼2.2
Labour	14	3	0	▲3	33.3	922,397	37.4	▲7.4
Liberal Democrats	0	0	0	Steady	0.0	376,608	15.3	▼5.7
Others	0	0	0	Steady	0.0	18,037	0.7	▲0.3
Total	42			Steady		2,466,556		

=== East Anglia ===
This region included Cambridgeshire, Norfolk and Suffolk.

Party	Seats					Aggregate Votes		
Party	Total	Gains	Losses	Net	Of all (%)	Total	Of all (%)	Change (%)
Conservative	17	0	2	▼2	85.0	635,754	51.1	▼1.1
Labour	3	2	0	▲2	15.0	348,353	28.0	▲6.3
Liberal Democrats	0	0	0	Steady	0.0	242,984	19.5	▼6.2
Others	0	0	0	Steady	0.0	18,424	1.5	▲1.0
Total	20			Steady		1,245,515		

=== Greater London ===
This consisted of the constituencies within the county and region of Greater London.

Party	Seats					Aggregate Votes		
Party	Total	Gains	Losses	Net	Of all (%)	Total	Of all (%)	Change (%)
Conservative	48	0	10	▼10	57.1	1,630,333	45.3	▼1.2
Labour	35	12	0	▲12	41.7	1,332,424	37.1	▲5.6
Liberal Democrats	1	0	2	▼2	1.2	543,741	15.1	▼6.2
Others	0	0	0	Steady	0.0	89,344	2.5	▲1.7
Total	84			Steady		3,595,842		

Greater London

=== South East England ===
This region included Hampshire, Isle of Wight, Oxfordshire, Berkshire, Buckinghamshire, Kent, Surrey, East Sussex and West Sussex within the current South East England. It also included Bedfordshire, Hertfordshire, Essex within the current East of England region.

However, it excluded Greater London, which was otherwise part of the standard statistical region at the time.

Party	Seats					Aggregate Votes		
Party	Total	Gains	Losses	Net	Of all (%)	Total	Of all (%)	Change (%)
Conservative	106	0	1	▼1	97.2	3,519,149	54.5	▼1.1
Labour	3	2	0	▲2	2.8	1,341,299	20.8	▲4.0
Liberal Democrats	0	0	0	Steady	0.0	1,507,305	23.3	▼3.8
Others	0	0	0	Steady	0.0	88,188	1.4	▲0.9
Total	109			▲1		6,455,871		

=== South West England ===
Like the current statistical region, this region included Cornwall, Dorset, Devon, Gloucestershire, Somerset, Wiltshire, and the defunct county of Avon.

Party	Seats					Aggregate Votes		
Party	Total	Gains	Losses	Net	Of all (%)	Total	Of all (%)	Change (%)
Conservative	38	0	6	▼6	79.2	1,387,923	47.6	▼3.0
Liberal Democrats	6	3	0	▲3	12.5	916,763	31.4	▼1.6
Labour	4	3	0	▲3	8.3	561,836	19.2	▲3.3
Others	0	0	0	Steady	0.0	52,191	1.8	▲1.3
Total	48			Steady		2,918,871		

=== West Midlands ===
Like the current statistical region, this region included Shropshire, Staffordshire, Warwickshire, the county of West Midlands, Herefordshire and Worcestershire.

Party	Seats					Aggregate Votes		
Party	Total	Gains	Losses	Net	Of all (%)	Total	Of all (%)	Change (%)
Conservative	29	0	7	▼7	50.0	1,390,246	44.8	▼0.8
Labour	29	7	0	▲7	50.0	1,203,351	38.8	▲5.5
Liberal Democrats	0	0	0	Steady	0.0	466,228	15.0	▼5.8
Others	0	0	0	Steady	0.0	45,124	1.5	▲1.1
Total	58			Steady		3,104,949		

=== North West ===
This region included Lancashire, Greater Manchester, Merseyside and Cheshire.

Party	Seats					Aggregate Votes		
Party	Total	Gains	Losses	Net	Of all (%)	Total	Of all (%)	Change (%)
Labour	44	8	0	▲8	60.3	1,660,023	44.9	▲3.7
Conservative	27	0	7	▼7	37.0	1,395,718	37.8	▼0.2
Liberal Democrats	2	0	1	▼1	2.7	582,168	15.8	▼4.8
Others	0	0	0	Steady	0.0	56,349	1.5	▲1.3
Total	73			Steady		3,694,258		

== See also ==
- 1992 United Kingdom general election in Northern Ireland
- 1992 United Kingdom general election in Scotland
- 1992 United Kingdom general election in Wales
- List of United Kingdom Parliament constituencies (1983–1997) by region
