= 1992 United Kingdom general election =

- 9 April 1992

All 651 seats in the House of Commons 326 seats needed for a majority
- Opinion polls
- Turnout: 33,614,074; 77.7% (▲2.4 pp)
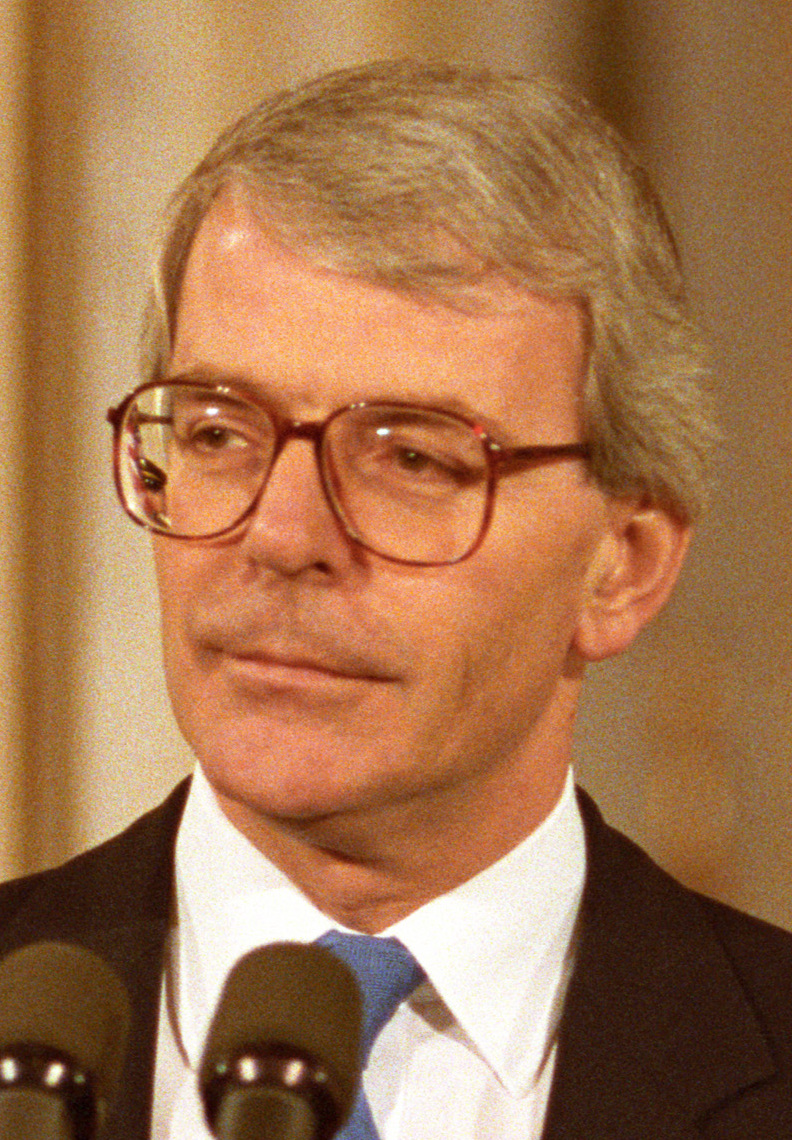

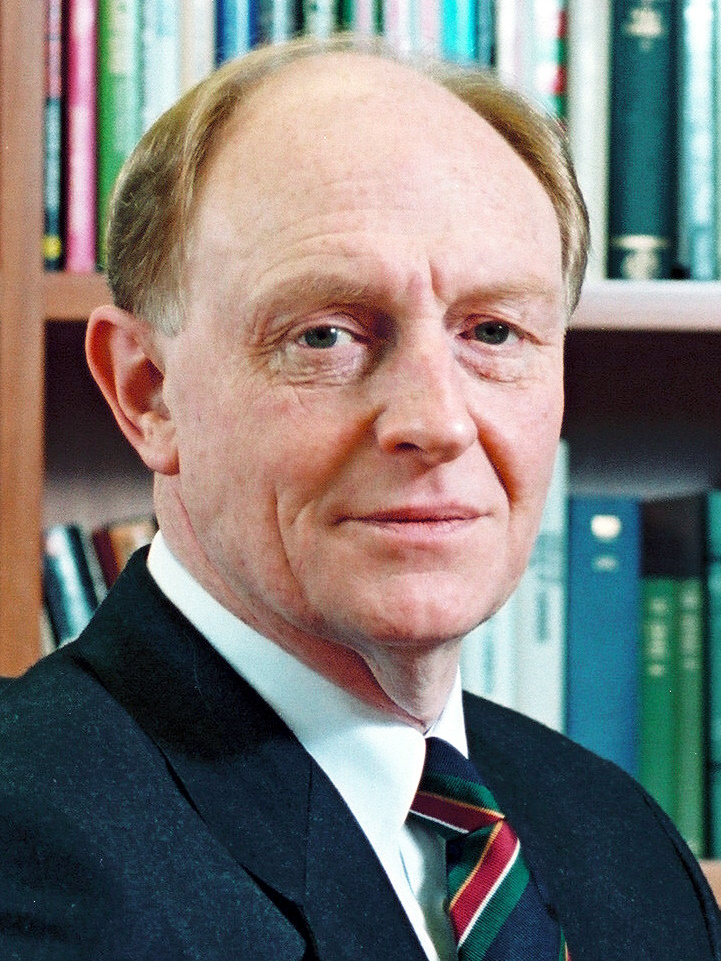

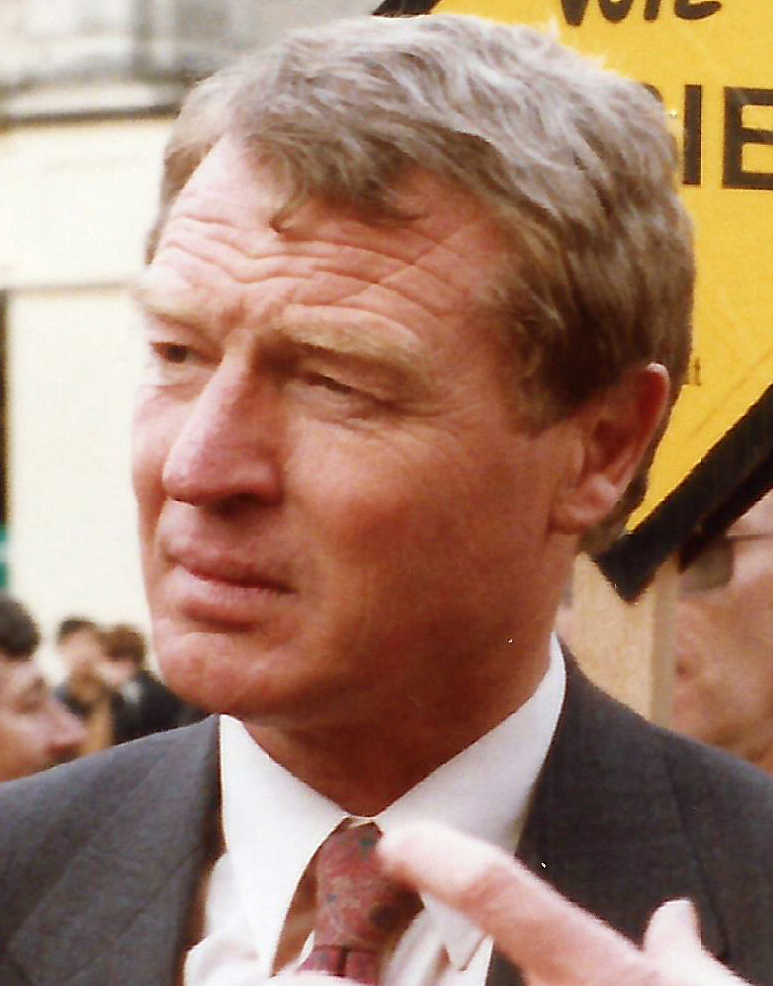
	First party	Second party	Third party
Leader	John Major	Neil Kinnock	Paddy Ashdown
Party	Conservative	Labour	Liberal Democrats
Leader since	27 November 1990	2 October 1983	16 July 1988
Leader's seat	Huntingdon	Islwyn	Yeovil
Last election	376 seats, 42.3%	229 seats, 30.8%	22 seats, 22.6% (Note: As SDP–Liberal Alliance; two of these refused to join the Liberal Democrats and remained in the continuing SDP)
Seats won	336	271	20
Seat change	▼40	▲42	▼2
Popular vote	14,093,007	11,560,484	5,999,606
Percentage	41.9%	34.4%	17.8%
Swing	▼0.4 pp	▲3.6 pp	▼4.8 pp
- Colours denote the winning party, as shown in the main table of results

- Composition of the House of Commons after the election
Prime Minister before election
John Major
Conservative
Prime Minister after election
John Major
Conservative

A general election was held in the United Kingdom on Thursday 9 April 1992, to elect 651 members to the House of Commons. The governing Conservative Party led by Prime Minister John Major won a fourth consecutive election victory, with a majority of 21. This would be the last time that the Conservatives would win an overall majority at a general election until 2015 and the last general election to be held on a day which did not coincide with any local elections until 2017. The result took many by surprise, as opinion polling leading up to the election day had shown a narrow but consistent lead for the Labour Party under leader Neil Kinnock during a period of recession and declining living standards. The polls predicted either a hung parliament or a Labour majority. The Conservatives received what remains the largest number of votes at a UK general election, breaking the previous record set by Labour in 1951.

Major had won the Conservative Party leadership election in November 1990 following the resignation of Prime Minister Margaret Thatcher. During his first term leading up to the 1992 election he oversaw the British involvement in the Gulf War, introduced legislation to replace the unpopular Community Charge with Council Tax, and signed the Maastricht Treaty. Britain was sliding into its second recession in a decade at the time of Major's appointment.

Thatcher left the House of Commons at this election, as did former Labour leader Michael Foot, former SDP leader David Owen, three former Chancellors of the Exchequer, Denis Healey, Geoffrey Howe and Nigel Lawson, and former Home Secretary Merlyn Rees. Francis Maude, Norman Tebbit, Rosie Barnes, Sinn Féin leader Gerry Adams and Speaker of the House of Commons Bernard Weatherill also left at this election, though Maude and Adams returned at the next election. Future Conservative leader Iain Duncan Smith was elected to Parliament for the first time in this election. As of 2026, the 1992–97 Parliament is the last in which every MP elected to the House of Commons took their seat (as Sinn Féin's MPs are abstentionist). Adams' defeat meant no Sinn Féin candidates were elected for the only time since 1983.

== Overview ==
The Conservatives had been re-elected in a landslide at the 1987 general election under the leadership of Margaret Thatcher, who had led the party back into power in 1979 and won a landslide majority in 1983, but her popularity and that of her government sharply declined due to internal divisions in the party and the unpopular Community Charge (also known as the 'poll tax'), as well as the fact that Britain was sliding into recession in the run-up to her resignation in November 1990.

Labour began to lead the Conservatives in the opinion polls by as much as 20 percentage points. Thatcher resigned following the party leadership ballot in November 1990, initiated by Michael Heseltine, and was replaced by her Chancellor of the Exchequer John Major. This was well received by the public; Labour lost some momentum as it reduced the impact of their calls for "Time for a Change".

On 16 January 1991, Operation Desert Storm began the Gulf War, the Major ministry's first foreign affairs crisis. The quick and successful outcome on the conflict led to a boost in opinion polls for Major, in spite of the deepening recession and rising unemployment. Another boost in the polls for Major was his announcement that the unpopular community charge (poll tax) would be replaced with the Council Tax. The Labour opposition made repeated calls for a general election to be held during 1991, but Major resisted these calls.

There is some evidence that the poll tax had a lasting side-effect of people not registering themselves on the electoral register to evade collection attempts, possibly because of the false impression that the words "poll tax" created. This may have affected the results of the 1992 general election.

As 1992 dawned, the recession had still not ended, unemployment now topped 2.5 million and the election loomed, with most opinion polls suggested that the election would produce a hung parliament or a narrow Labour majority, although the lead in the polls had shifted between Tory and Labour on several occasions since November 1990.

Parliament was due to expire no later than 16 June 1992. Major called the election on 11 March, as was widely expected, the day after Chancellor of the Exchequer Norman Lamont had delivered the Budget. The Conservatives maintained strong support in many newspapers, especially The Sun, which ran a series of anti-Labour articles that culminated on election day with a front-page headline which urged "the last person to leave Britain" to "turn out the lights" if Labour won the election.

== Campaign ==
The 50th Parliament of the United Kingdom sat for the last time on Monday 16 March, being dissolved on the same day. The 1992 election was fought on the same boundaries as the 1983 and 1987 elections, with one exception- the Milton Keynes constituency was split into North East Milton Keynes and Milton Keynes South West. This unusual case of a specific constituency being changed in between periodic boundary reviews, as opposed to all of them at once, was done because the new town's electorate had reached over 129,000 people by 1992, significantly more than twice the average electorate at the time.

Under the leadership of Neil Kinnock, the Labour Party had undergone further developments and alterations since its 1987 general election defeat. Labour entered the campaign confident, with most opinion polls showing a slight Labour lead that if maintained suggested a hung parliament, with no single party having an overall majority.

The parties campaigned on the familiar grounds of taxation and health care. Major became known for delivering his speeches while standing on an upturned soapbox during public meetings. Immigration was also an issue, with Home Secretary Kenneth Baker making a controversial speech stating that, under Labour, the floodgates would be opened for immigrants from developing countries. Some speculated that this was a bid by the Conservatives to shore up its support amongst its white working-class supporters. The Conservatives also attacked The Labour Party over the issue of taxation, producing a memorable poster entitled "Labour's Double-Whammy", showing a boxer wearing gloves marked "tax rises" and "inflation".

An early setback for Labour came in the form of the "War of Jennifer's Ear" controversy, which questioned the truthfulness of a Labour party election broadcast concerning National Health Service (NHS) waiting lists.

The Conservative's political broadcast, The Journey, featured Major being driven around his childhood home of Brixton while being interviewed. It was directed by John Schlesinger.

Labour seemingly recovered from the NHS controversy, and opinion polls on 1 April (dubbed "Red Wednesday") showed a clear Labour lead. But the lead fell considerably in the following day's polls. Observers blamed the decline on the Labour Party's triumphalist "Sheffield Rally", an enthusiastic American-style political convention at the Sheffield Arena, where Neil Kinnock famously cried out "We're all right!" three times. However, some analysts and participants in the campaign believed it actually had little effect, with the event only receiving widespread attention after the election.

This was the first general election for the newly formed Liberal Democrats, a party formed by the formal merger of the SDP–Liberal Alliance following the 1987 general election. Its formation had not been without its problems, but under the strong leadership of Paddy Ashdown, who proved to be a likeable and candid figure, the party went into the election ready to win votes and seats. They focused on education throughout the campaign, as well as a promise on reforming the voting system.

The weather was largely dull for most of the campaign, as would be typical in early-spring Britain, but the warm and sunny conditions on 9 April may have been a factor in the high turnout.

== Minor parties ==
In Scotland, the Scottish National Party (SNP) hoped for a major electoral breakthrough in 1992 and had run a hard independence campaign with "Free by '93" as their slogan, urging voters to back a party which would deliver Scottish independence from the United Kingdom. Although the party increased its total vote by 50% compared to 1987, they only held onto the three seats they had won at the previous election. They lost Glasgow Govan, which their deputy leader Jim Sillars had taken from Labour in a by-election in 1988. Sillars quit active politics after the general election with a parting shot at the Scottish electorate as being "ninety-minute patriots", referring to their support of the Scotland football team only during match time.

The election also saw a small change in Northern Ireland: the Conservatives organised and stood candidates in the constituent country for the first time since the Ulster Unionist Party had broken with them in 1972 over the Sunningdale Agreement. Although they won no seats, their best result was Laurence Kennedy achieving over 14,000 votes to run second to James Kilfedder in North Down.

== Retirees ==
Former prime minister Margaret Thatcher stepped down at the general election, as did former cabinet minister Norman Tebbit, Labour veteran Denis Healey, former Conservative chancellor Nigel Lawson, Geoffrey Howe, former Labour leader Michael Foot, former SDP leader David Owen, Merlyn Rees, then-Speaker Bernard Weatherill, former Conservative Party chairman Cecil Parkinson, John Wakeham, Nicholas Ridley and Peter Morrison. Alan Clark also retired from Parliament, though he returned in 1997 as MP for Kensington and Chelsea, only to die two years later.

== Endorsements ==
The following newspapers endorsed political parties running in the election in the following ways:

Newspaper	Party/ies endorsed	Circulation (in millions)
The Sun	Conservative Party	3.6
Daily Mirror	Labour Party	2.9
Daily Mail	Conservative Party	1.7
Daily Express	Conservative Party	1.5
The Daily Telegraph	Conservative Party	1.0
The Guardian	Labour Party	0.4
The Guardian	Liberal Democrats	0.4
The Independent	None	0.4
The Times	Conservative Party	0.4

In a move later described in The Observer as appalling to its City readership, the Financial Times endorsed the Labour Party in this general election.

== Opinion polling ==
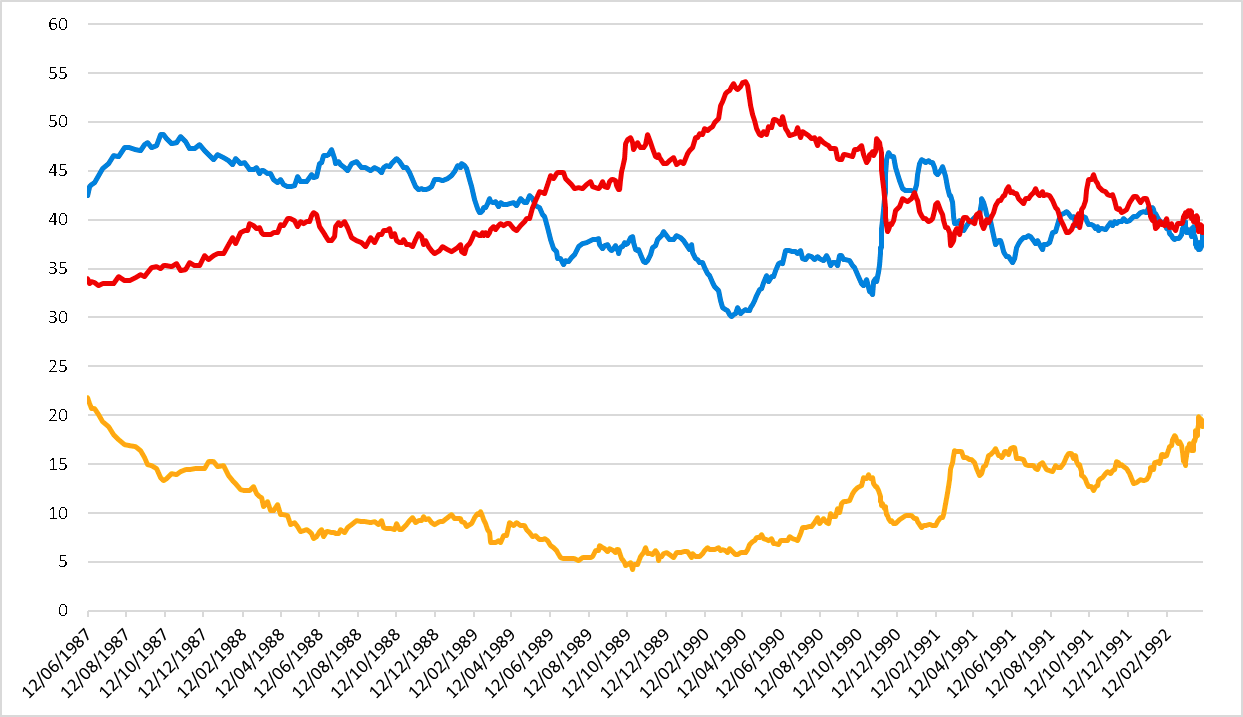
Opinion polling for the 1992 UK General Election, with a 7-poll moving average. Conservative Labour Liberal Democrats

Almost every poll leading up to polling day predicted either a hung parliament with Labour the largest party, or a small Labour majority of around 19 to 23. Polls on the last few days before the country voted predicted a very slim Labour majority. Of the 50 opinion polls published during the election campaign period, 38 suggested Labour had a narrow but clear lead. After the polls closed, the BBC and ITV exit polls still predicted that there would be a hung parliament and "that the Conservatives would only just get more seats than Labour".

With opinion polls at the end of the campaign showing Labour and the Conservatives neck and neck, the actual election result was a surprise to many in the media and in polling organisations. The apparent failure of the opinion polls to come close to predicting the actual result led to an inquiry by the Market Research Society, and would eventually result in the creation of the British Polling Council a decade later. Following the election, most opinion polling companies changed their methodology in the belief that a 'Shy Tory factor' affected the polling.

== Results ==
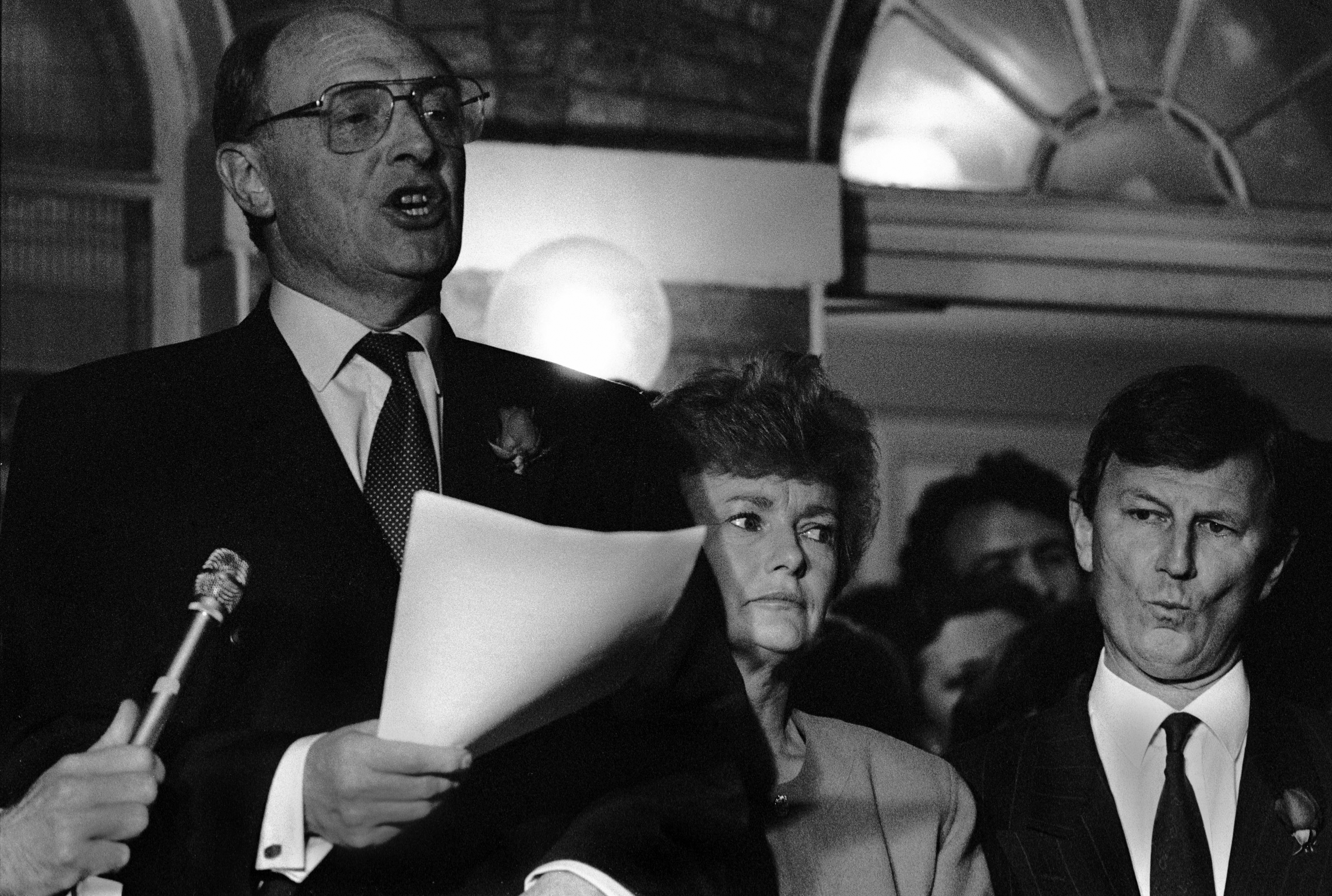
Labour Leader Neil Kinnock conceding defeat

Results map

The election turnout of 77.67% was the highest in 18 years. There was an overall Labour swing of 2.2%, which widened the gap between Labour and the Liberal Democrats. Although the percentage of Conservative votes was only 0.3% down on 1987, and Labour's was only up 3.6%, the Conservative overall majority in the House of Commons was reduced from 102 to 21, largely because the fall in the Liberal Democrat vote relative to the previous SDP–Liberal Alliance caused the Conservatives to lose several seats that they had won in 1983 and 1987 due to the opposition vote being split between Labour and Alliance candidates. The government's majority was reduced progressively during the course of Major's term in office due to defections of MPs to other parties, by-election defeats, and for a time in 1994–95 the suspension of the Conservative whip for some MPs who voted against the government on its European policy—by 1996, the Conservative majority had been reduced to just 1 seat, and they were in a minority going into 1997 until the 1997 general election. The Conservatives in 1992 received 14,093,007 votes, the highest total of votes for any political party in any UK general election, beating the previous largest total vote of 13.98 million achieved by Labour in 1951 (although this was from a smaller electorate and represented a higher vote share). Nine government ministers lost their seats in 1992, including party chairman Chris Patten.

The Sun's analysis of the election results was headlined "It's The Sun Wot Won It", though in his testimony to the April 2012 Leveson Inquiry, Rupert Murdoch claimed that the "infamous" headline was "both tasteless and wrong". Tony Blair also accepted this theory of Labour's defeat and put considerable effort into securing The Sun's support for New Labour, both as Leader of the Opposition before the 1997 general election and as Prime Minister afterwards.

Steve Richards notes that one theory for Labour's defeat relates to Kinnock seeming triumphalist, "overconfident and cocky" at a major Labour Party election rally in Sheffield. At the time of the event polls suggested Labour was well ahead of the Conservatives. Richards argues the rally "acquired a mythological status as fatal event" after Labour's defeat, but considers this theory to be "a red herring". He notes that prior to the result of the election becoming known, "there was no suggestion that Kinnock had made a terrible blunder" at the event. Indeed, Richards notes that the BBC's political editor John Cole had indicated he had been impressed in his live reporting of the rally which Cole compared with similar events held by President Kennedy. Richards concluded that the party would have lost the election even if there had been no Sheffield Rally.

This election continued the Conservatives' decline in Northern England, with Labour regaining many seats they had not held since 1979. The Conservatives also began to lose support in the Midlands, but achieved a slight increase in their vote in Scotland, where they had a net gain of one seat. Labour and Plaid Cymru strengthened in Wales, with Conservative support declining. However, in the South East, South West, London and Eastern England the Conservative vote held up, leading to few losses there: many considered Basildon to be indicative of a nouveau riche working-class element, referred to as Essex man, voting strongly Conservative. This election is the most recent in which the Conservatives won more seats than Labour in Greater London, at 48 to 35; in the 1997 election, the Conservatives would win only 11.

For the Liberal Democrats their first election campaign was a reasonable success; the party had worked itself up from a "low base" during its troubled creation and come out relatively unscathed.

It was Labour's second general election defeat under leader Neil Kinnock and deputy leader Roy Hattersley. Both resigned soon after the election, and were succeeded by John Smith and Margaret Beckett respectively.

Sitting MPs Dave Nellist, Terry Fields, Ron Brown, John Hughes and Syd Bidwell, who had been expelled or deselected by the Labour Party and stood as independents, were all defeated, although in Nellist's case only very narrowly. Tommy Sheridan, fighting the election from prison, polled 19% in Glasgow Pollok.

=== Summary of seats returned ===
Party	Leader	MPs		Aggregate votes	
Party	Leader		Of total		Of total
Conservative and Unionist Party	John Major	336	51.6%	14,093,007	41.9%
Labour Party	Neil Kinnock	271 (Note: Includes 14 Co-operative Party MP, as part of the Labour-Co-op alliance.)	41.6%	11,560,484	34.4%
Liberal Democrats	Paddy Ashdown	20	3.1%	5,999,606	17.8%
Ulster Unionist Party	James Molyneaux	9	1.4%	271,049	0.8%
Social Democratic and Labour Party	John Hume	4	0.6%	184,445	0.5%
Plaid Cymru	Dafydd Wigley	4	0.6%	154,947	0.5%
Scottish National Party	Alex Salmond	3	0.5%	629,564	1.9%
Democratic Unionist Party	Ian Paisley	3	0.5%	103,039	0.3%
Ulster Popular Unionist Party	James Kilfedder	1	0.2%	19,305	0.1%

=== Full results ===

Results of the April 1992 general election to the House of Commons of the United Kingdom
Party	Leader	Candidates	MPs					Aggregate votes		
Party	Leader	Candidates	Total	Gains	Losses	Net	Of all (%)	Total	Of all (%)	Change (%)
Conservative	John; Major	645	336	3	43	▼40	51.6	14,093,007	41.9	▼0.4
Labour	Neil; Kinnock	634 (Note: Includes 27 Co-operative Party candidates, as part of the Labour-Co-op alliance.)	271 (Note: Includes 14 Co-operative Party MPs, as part of the Labour-Co-op alliance.)	43	1 (Note: Aberdeen South.)	▲42 (Note: Includes ▲5 Co-operative Party MPs, as part of the Labour-Co-op alliance.)	41.6 (Note: Includes 2.2% for the Co-operative Party, as part of the Labour-Co-op alliance.)	11,560,484 (Note: Includes 495,702 for the Co-operative Party, as part of the Labour-Co-op alliance.)	34.4 (Note: Includes 1.5% for the Co-operative Party, as part of the Labour-Co-op alliance.)	▲3.6 (Note: Includes ▲0.5% for the Co-operative Party, as part of the Labour-Co-op alliance.)
Liberal Democrats	Paddy; Ashdown	632	20	4	6	▼2	3.1	5,999,606	17.8	▼4.8
SNP	Alex; Salmond	72	3	0	0	Steady	0.5	629,564	1.9	▲0.6
UUP	James; Molyneaux	13	9	0	0	Steady	1.4	271,049	0.8	Steady
SDLP	John; Hume	13	4	1 (Note: Belfast West.)	0	▲1	0.6	184,445	0.5	Steady
Green	Jean; Lambert & Richard; Lawson	237 (Note: Includes 3 candidates that stood as joint Plaid Cymru-Green candidates, but does not include the candidates that stood for the Scottish Green Party.)	0	0	0	Steady	—	163,536	0.5	▲0.2 (Note: Results are compared with Green Party in the 1987 United Kingdom general election.)
Plaid Cymru	Dafydd; Wigley	35 (Note: Does not include 3 candidates that stood as joint Plaid Cymru-Green candidates.)	4	1 (Note: Ceredigion and Pembroke North.)	0	▲1	0.6	154,947	0.5	▲0.1
DUP	Ian; Paisley	7	3	0	0	Steady	0.5	103,039	0.3	Steady
Sinn Féin	Gerry; Adams	14	0	0	1 (Note: Belfast West.)	▼1	—	78,291	0.2	▼0.1
Alliance	John; Alderdice	16	0	0	0	Steady	—	68,665	0.2	Steady
Liberal	Michael; Meadowcroft	72	0	New			—	64,205	0.2	New
Natural Law	Geoffrey; Clements	309	0	New			—	62,888	0.2	New
Independent; Social Democrat	—N/a	4	0	Did not stand in 1987			—	29,781	0.1	—N/a
Independent; Labour	—N/a	6	0	0	0	Steady	—	22,844	0.1	▲0.1
Independent	—N/a	50	0	0	0	Steady	—	20,013	0.1	▲0.1
UPUP	James; Kilfedder	1 (Note: North Down.)	1	0	0	Steady	0.2	19,305	0.1	Steady
Independent; Conservative	—N/a	14	0	0	0	Steady	—	14,330	0.0	Steady
Scottish Green	Robin; Harper	19	0	New			—	8,391	0.0	New
Monster Raving Loony	David; Sutch	24	0	0	0	Steady	—	8,024	0.0	Steady
BNP	John; Tyndall	13	0	0	0	Steady	—	7,005	0.0	Steady
Scottish Militant Labour	Tommy; Sheridan	1 (Note: Galsgow Pollok.)	0	New			—	6,287	0.0	New
SDP	John; Bates	6	0	New			—	5,481	0.0	New
National Front	John; McAuley	14	0	0	0	Steady	—	4,816	0.0	Steady
True Labour	Syd; Bidwell	1 (Note: Ealing Southall.)	0	New			—	4,665	0.0	New
Anti-Federalist League	Alan; Sked	17	0	New			—	4,383	0.0	New
Workers' Party	Marian; Donnelly	8	0	0	0	Steady	—	4,359	0.0	Steady
Raving Loony Green Giant	Stuart; Hughes	6 (Note: Candidates stood in Carshalton and Wallington, Honiton, Newham North West, Ribble Valley, Swindon and Gower.)	0	New			—	2,462	0.0	New
Independent; Unionist	—N/a	1 (Note: Belfast East.)	0	Did not stand in 1987			—	2,256	0.0	—N/a
New Agenda	Proinsias; De Rossa	2	0	Did not stand in 1987			—	2,133	0.0	—N/a
Labour and Trade Union	Peter; Hadden	2	0	Did not stand in 1987			—	1,264	0.0	—N/a
Ind. Progressive; Socialist	—N/a	1 (Note: Fermanagh and South Tyrone.)	0	New			—	1,094	0.0	New
Islamic Party	David; Pidcock	4	0	New			—	1,085	0.0	New
Morecambe Bay; Independents	—N/a	1 (Note: Morecambe and Lunesdale.)	0	New			—	916	0.0	New
Revolutionary Communist	Frank; Furedi	8	0	Did not stand in 1987			—	745	0.0	—N/a
Real Bean	Captain; Bean	1 (Note: Aberavon.)	0	New			—	707	0.0	New
Independent; Nationalist	—N/a	1 (Note: Halifax.)	0	New			—	649	0.0	New
Communist (PCC)	Jack; Conrad	4	0	New			—	603	0.0	New
Epping Forest; Residents	—N/a	1	0	New			—	552	0.0	New
Feudal; Party	—N/a	1	0	0	0	Steady	—	410	0.0	Steady
Protestant; Reformation	—N/a	1	0	New			—	393	0.0	New
Pensioners'; Party	—N/a	1	0	New			—	391	0.0	New
Lodestar; Party	—N/a	1	0	New			—	334	0.0	New
Workers Revolutionary	Sheila; Torrance	2	0	0	0	Steady	—	330	0.0	Steady
Communist League	Collective; Leadership	3	0	New			—	315	0.0	New
ICP	Collective; Leadership	4	0	New			—	342	0.0	New
Independent; Socialist	—N/a	2	0	0	0	Steady	—	320	0.0	Steady
Rainbow Dream Ticket	Rainbow; George Weiss	4 (Note: 3 candidates stood in Hampstead and Highgate and 1 in Streatham.)	0	0	0	Steady	—	266	0.0	Steady
Fancy Dress	John; Crockford	1	0	0	0	Steady	—	262	0.0	Steady
Christian; Democrat	—N/a	1	0	Did not stand in 1987			—	244	0.0	—N/a
The People's; Choice!	—N/a	1	0	New			—	239	0.0	New
Conservative; Thatcherite	—N/a	1	0	New			—	231	0.0	New
Funstermentalist; Candidate	—N/a	1	0	New			—	213	0.0	New
End Unemployment; Vote Justice	—N/a	1	0	New			—	212	0.0	New
Socialist (GB)	Collective; Leadership	1	0	0	0	Steady	—	175	0.0	Steady
Chauvinist; Raving Alliance	—N/a	1	0	New			—	175	0.0	New
British; Independent	—N/a	1	0	New			—	172	0.0	New
Freedom From; British Rail	—N/a	1	0	New			—	149	0.0	New
Fellowship	Ronald; Mallone	1	0	0	0	Steady	—	147	0.0	Steady
Corrective; Party	—N/a	1	0	New			—	140	0.0	New
Gremloids; Party	—N/a	1	0	0	0	Steady	—	107	0.0	Steady
Irish; Freedom	—N/a	1	0	New			—	107	0.0	New
Democratic Liberal and Conservative	—N/a	1	0	New			—	103	0.0	New
Anglo- Saxon	—N/a	1	0	New			—	98	0.0	New
Forward to Mars	—N/a	1	0	New			—	91	0.0	New
Stuck-Off; Doctors	—N/a	1	0	New			—	87	0.0	New
Twenty First; Century	—N/a	1	0	New			—	75	0.0	New
Anti-Paddy; Ashdown	—N/a	1	0	New			—	70	0.0	New
Blank and invalid votes								39,726	—	—
Total		2,949	651			▲1	100.0	33,614,074 (Note: All valid votes excluding spoiled votes.)	100.0	0.0
Registered voters, and turnout									77.7	▲2.4

Popular vote
Conservative	41.9%
Labour	34.4%
Liberal Democrat	17.8%
Scottish National	1.9%
Ulster Unionist	0.8%
Others	2.9%

Parliamentary seats
Conservative	51.6%
Labour	41.6%
Liberal Democrat	3.1%
Ulster Unionist	1.4%
Others	2.3%

Seats won in the election (outer ring) against number of votes (inner ring)

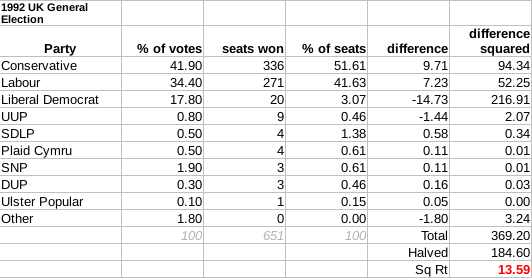
The disproportionality of the house of parliament in the 1992 election was 13.59 according to the Gallagher Index, mainly between the Liberal Democrats and the Conservatives.

=== Results by voter characteristics ===
Ethnic group voting intention
Ethnic group	Party			
Ethnic group	Labour	Conservative	SDP/Lib	Other
Ethnic minority (non-White)	81%	10%	n/a	9%
Asian	77%	11%	10%	3%
Afro-Caribbean	85%	8%	6%	1%

Ethnic group by class voting intention
Ethnic group	Class			
Ethnic group	White		non-White	
Ethnic group	ABC1	C2DE	ABC1	C2DE
Labour	37%	52%	54%	78%
Conservative	47%	28%	31%	8%

== Incumbents defeated ==
Party	Name	Constituency	Office held while in power	Year elected	Defeated by	Party
Conservative Party	Humfrey Malins	Croydon North West		1983	Malcolm Wicks	Labour Party
Conservative Party	Michael Knowles	Nottingham East		1983	John Heppell	Labour Party
Conservative Party	Martin Brandon-Bravo	Nottingham South		1983	Alan Simpson	Labour Party
Conservative Party	Andy Stewart	Sherwood	Parliamentary private secretary to the Leader of the House of Commons	1983	Paddy Tipping	Labour Party
Conservative Party	Tim Janman	Thurrock		1987	Andrew MacKinlay	Labour Party
Conservative Party	Michael Irvine	Ipswich		1987	Jamie Cann	Labour Party
Conservative Party	Colin Moynihan	Lewisham East	Parliamentary Under-Secretary of State for Energy	1983	Bridget Prentice	Labour Party
Conservative Party	Sir William Shelton	Streatham		1970	Keith Hill	Labour Party
Conservative Party	Patrick Ground QC	Feltham and Heston		1983	Alan Keen	Labour Party
Conservative Party	Sir Neil Thorne	Ilford South		1979	Mike Gapes	Labour Party
Conservative Party	Hugo Summerson	Walthamstow		1987	Neil Gerrard	Labour Party
Conservative Party	Michael Fallon	Darlington	Parliamentary Under-Secretary of State for Education	1983	Alan Milburn	Labour Party
Conservative Party	Chris Butler	Warrington South		1987	Mike Hall	Labour Party
Conservative Party	Cecil Franks	Barrow and Furness		1983	John Hutton	Labour Party
Conservative Party	Tony Favell	Stockport		1983	Ann Coffey	Labour Party
Conservative Party	Ken Hargreaves	Hyndburn		1983	Greg Pope	Labour Party
Conservative Party	John Lee	Pendle		1979	Gordon Prentice	Labour Party
Conservative Party	Ken Hind	Lancashire West	Parliamentary private secretary to the Secretary of State for Northern Ireland	1983	Colin Pickthall	Labour Party
Conservative Party	Sir David Trippier	Rossendale and Darwen		1979	Janet Anderson	Labour Party
Conservative Party	The Right Honourable; Lynda Chalker	Wallasey	Minister for Overseas Development & Africa	1974	Angela Eagle	Labour Party
Conservative Party	Christopher Chope	Southampton Itchen	Parliamentary Under-Secretary of State for Transport	1983	John Denham	Labour Party
Conservative Party	The Right Honourable; Chris Patten	Bath	Chancellor of the Duchy of Lancaster & Chairman of the Conservative Party	1979	Don Foster	Liberal Democrats
Conservative Party	Jonathan Sayeed	Bristol East	Parliamentary private secretary to the Paymaster General	1983	Jean Cortson	Labour Party
Conservative Party	Rob Hayward	Kingswood		1983	Roger Berry	Labour Party
Conservative Party	Sir Gerry Neale	North Cornwall		1979	Paul Tyler	Liberal Democrats
Conservative Party	Tony Speller	North Devon		1979	Nick Harvey	Liberal Democrats
Conservative Party	Lewis Stevens	Nuneaton		1983	Bill Olner	Labour Party
Conservative Party	The Right Honourable; Francis Maude	North Warwickshire	Financial Secretary to the Treasury	1983	Mike O'Brien	Labour Party
Conservative Party	Roger King	Birmingham Northfield		1983	Richard Burden	Labour Party
Conservative Party	Anthony Beaumont-Dark	Birmingham Selly Oak		1979	Lynne Jones	Labour Party
Conservative Party	David Gilroy Bevan	Birmingham Yardley		1979	Estelle Morris	Labour Party
Conservative Party	Maureen Hicks	Wolverhampton North East	Parliamentary private secretary to the Minister of State for the Foreign and Commonwealth Office	1987	Ken Purchase	Labour Party
Conservative Party	Ian Grist	Cardiff Central		1974	Jon Owen Jones	Labour Party
Conservative Party	John Maples	Lewisham West	Economic Secretary to the Treasury	1983	Jim Dowd	Labour Party
Conservative Party	Gerald Bowden	Dulwich		1983	Tessa Jowell	Labour Party
Conservative Party	Gerald Howarth	Cannock and Burntwood		1983	Tony Wright	Labour Party
Conservative Party	Conal Gregory	York		1983	Hugh Bayley	Labour Party
Conservative Party	Nicholas Bennett	Pembrokeshire	Parliamentary Under-Secretary of State for Wales	1983	Nick Ainger	Labour Party
Labour Party	Frank Doran	Aberdeen South		1987	Raymond Robertson	Conservative Party
Labour Party	John Smith	Vale of Glamorgan		1989	Walter Sweeney	Conservative Party
Labour Party	Huw Edwards	Monmouth		1991	Roger Kenneth Evans	Conservative Party
Labour Party	Ashok Kumar	Langbaurgh		1991	Michael Bates	Conservative Party
Labour Party	Sylvia Heal	Mid Staffordshire		1990	Michael Fabricant	Conservative Party
Liberal Democrats	Michael Carr	Ribble Valley		1991	Nigel Evans	Conservative Party
Liberal Democrats	Ronnie Fearn	Southport		1987	Matthew Banks	Conservative Party
Liberal Democrats	David Bellotti	Eastbourne		1990	Nigel Waterson	Conservative Party
Liberal Democrats	Nicol Stephen	Kincardine and Deeside		1991	George Kynoch	Conservative Party
Liberal Democrats	Richard Livsey	Brecon and Radnor		1985	Jonathan Evans	Conservative Party
Liberal Democrats	Geraint Howells	Ceredigion and Pembroke North		1974	Cynog Dafis	Plaid Cymru
Social Democratic Party	Rosie Barnes	Greenwich		1987	Nick Raynsford	Labour Party
Social Democratic Party	John Cartwright	Woolwich		1974	John Austin	Labour Party
Scottish National Party	Jim Sillars	Glasgow Govan	Depute Leader of the Scottish National Party	1988	Ian Davidson	Labour Party
Scottish National Party	Dick Douglas	Dunfermline West (contested Glasgow Garscadden)		1979	Donald Dewar	Labour Party
Independent	John Browne	Winchester		1979	Gerry Malone	Conservative Party
Independent	Dave Nellist	Coventry South East		1983	Jim Cunningham	Labour Party
Independent	John Hughes	Coventry North East		1987	Bob Ainsworth	Labour Party
Independent	Terry Fields	Liverpool Broadgreen		1983	Jane Kennedy	Labour Party
Independent	Syd Bidwell	Ealing Southall		1966	Piara Khabra	Labour Party
Independent	Ron Brown	Edinburgh Leith		1979	Malcolm Chisholm	Labour Party
Sinn Féin	Gerry Adams	Belfast West	President of Sinn Féin	1983	Joe Hendron	Social Democratic and Labour Party

== Television coverage ==
The BBC ran coverage from 21:55 till 06:00, and from 09:30 till 16:00 on Friday 10 April. Unlike most prior British elections, the BBC's coverage started five minutes before the polls closed and the result of the exit poll was announced live, accompanied by footage of Big Ben striking, at 10pm. This method of revealing the exit poll has been repeated in all subsequent BBC election night broadcasts.

Coverage was, according to the Radio Times, supposed to end at 04:00 on Friday morning, but was extended.

The BBC began construction of the Election 92 studio in October 1990, completing it in February 1991, due to speculation that an early election may be called in 1991. Rehearsals were held in the event of a Conservative and Labour victory.

Although the election was not part of the storyline, there was much background chanting and campaigning in the BBC television soap opera EastEnders.

On ITV, ITN produced their election night coverage from their studios in London, with Jon Snow anchoring the coverage from 22:00 until 06:00. They continued their daytime coverage on Friday 10 April from 09:25 until 15:25. Breakfast coverage of the election results were provided by TV-am, the ITV breakfast franchise, from 06:00 until 09:25, who were producing their third and final general election special.

== See also ==
- List of MPs elected in the 1992 United Kingdom general election
- 1992 United Kingdom general election in England
- 1992 United Kingdom general election in Scotland
- 1992 United Kingdom general election in Wales
- 1992 United Kingdom general election in Northern Ireland
- 1992 United Kingdom local elections
- Baltic Exchange bombing

== Manifestos ==
- The Best Future For Britain – 1992 Conservative manifesto.
- It's time to get Britain working again – 1992 Labour Party manifesto.
- Changing Britain for good – 1992 Liberal Democrats manifesto.
