= 1992 United States Virgin Islands gambling referendum =

Ballot measure in the US Virgin Islands

A referendum on allowing casino gambling was held in the United States Virgin Islands on 3 November 1992. The result was binding only if a majority of registered voters participated. The proposal was rejected by a wide margin, but was later approved in a 1994 referendum.

== Results ==
| Choice | Votes | % |
|---|---|---|
| For | 5,954 | 37.65 |
| Against | 9,858 | 62.35 |
| Total | 15,812 | 100.00 |
Source: VI Vote
