= 1992 Baton Rouge mayoral election =

- October 3, 1992

Candidate	Tom Ed McHugh	Ron Johnson	Kim P. Carmouche
Party	Democratic	Democratic	Republican
Popular vote	69,925	17,253	8,289
Percentage	73.25%	18.07%	8.68%
Mayor before election
Tom Ed McHugh
Democratic
Elected mayor
Tom Ed McHugh
Democratic

The 1992 Baton Rouge mayoral election was held on October 3, 1992, in order to elect the mayor-president of Baton Rouge, Louisiana. Incumbent Mayor Thomas Edward McHugh won re-election against fellow Democratic candidate Ron Johnson, and Republican candidate Kim P. Carmouche.

== General Election ==
The general election was held on October 3, 1992. Incumbent Mayor Thomas Edward McHugh won re-election by a margin of 52,672 votes against his foremost opponent and fellow Democratic candidate Ron Johnson, thereby retaining Democratic control over the office of Mayor of Baton Rouge.

=== Results ===
Baton Rouge mayoral election, 1992
Party	Candidate	Votes	%
Democratic	Tom Ed McHugh (incumbent)	69,925	73.25
Democratic	Ron Johnson	17,253	18.07
Republican	Kim P. Carmouche	8,289	8.68
Total votes		95,467	100.00
Democratic hold			
