= 1992 United Kingdom general election in Scotland =

- 9 April 1992

All 72 Scottish seats to the House of Commons
- Turnout: 75.5% (▲0.4%)
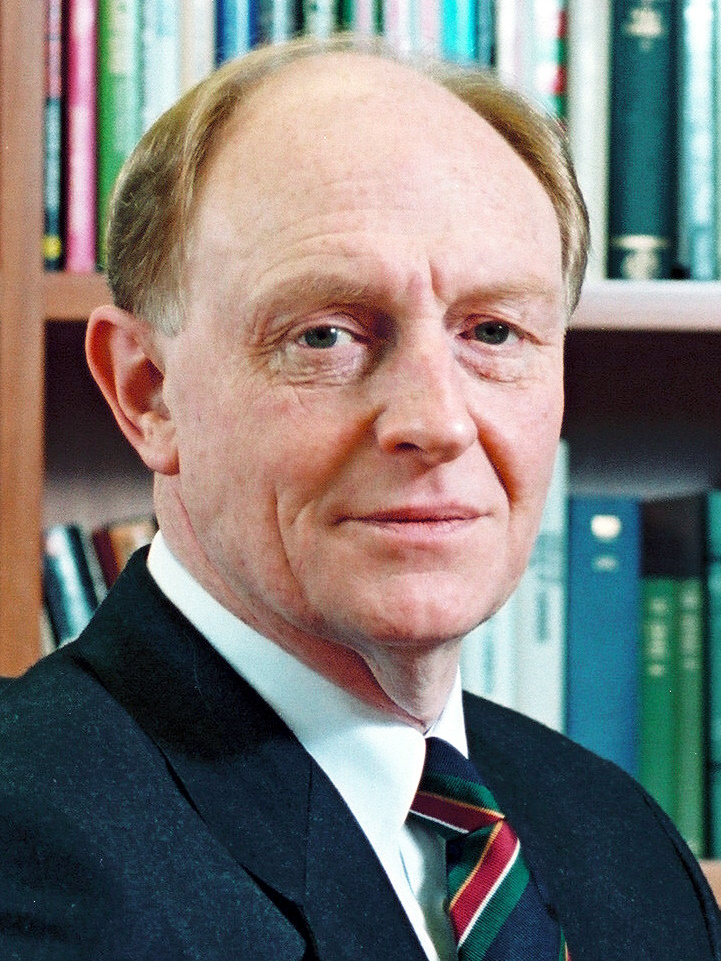

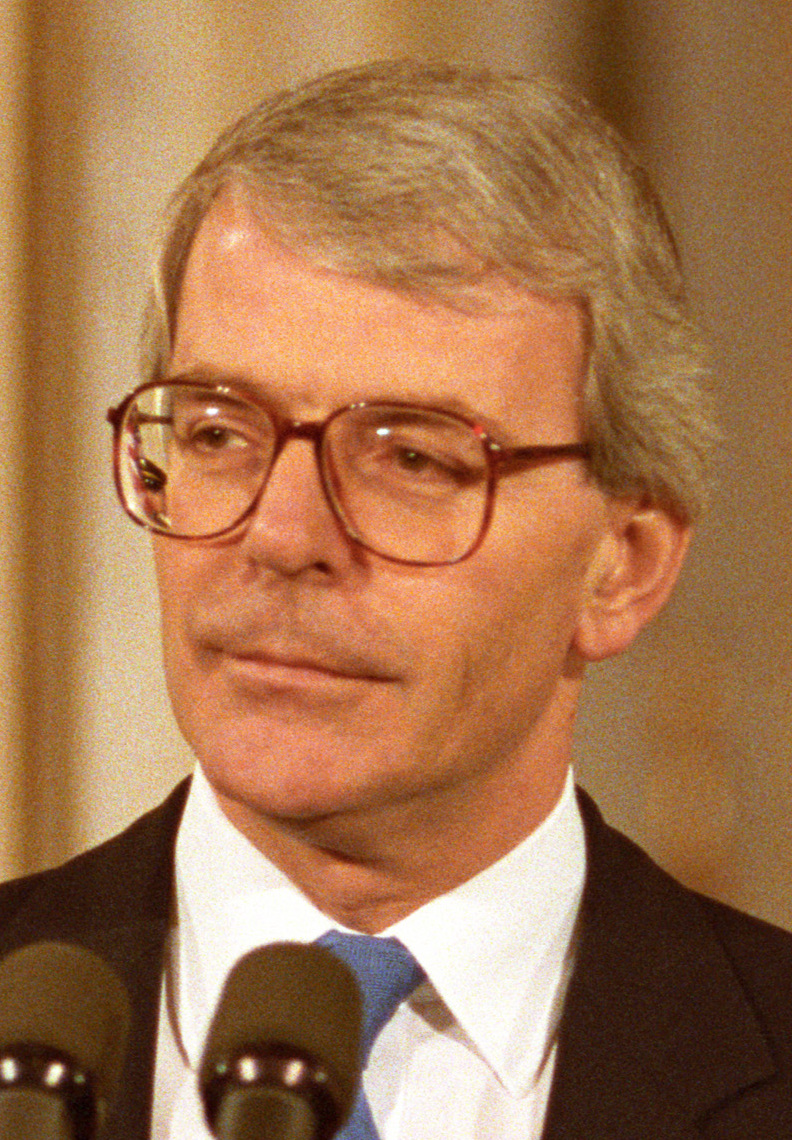

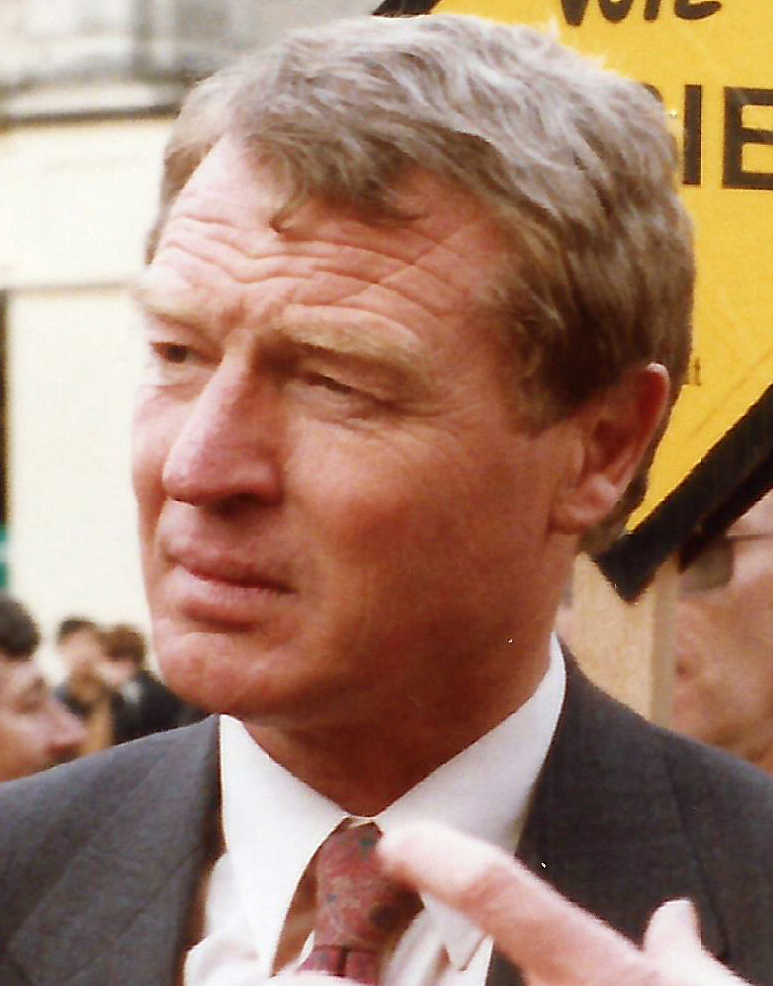

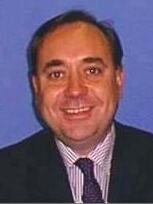
	First party	Second party
Leader	Neil Kinnock	John Major
Party	Labour	Conservative
Leader since	2 October 1983	28 November 1990
Leader's seat	Islwyn	Huntingdon
Last election	50 seats, 42.4%	10 seats, 24.0%
Seats won	49	11
Seat change	▼1	▲1
Popular vote	1,142,911	751,950
Percentage	39.0%	25.6%
Swing	▼3.4 pp	▲1.6 pp
	Third party	Fourth party
Leader	Paddy Ashdown	Alex Salmond
Party	Liberal Democrats	SNP
Leader since	16 July 1988	22 September 1990
Leader's seat	Yeovil	Banff and Buchan
Last election	9 seats, 19.2% (Note: Figure is the combined result of the SDP-Liberal Alliance parties - the Liberal Party and Social Democratic Party - which formed the Liberal Democrats.)	3 seats, 14.0%
Seats won	9	3
Seat change	Steady	Steady
Popular vote	383,856	629,564
Percentage	13.1%	21.5%
Swing	▼6.1 pp	▲7.5 pp

On Thursday 9 April 1992, the 1992 United Kingdom general election was held in Scotland, to elect all 651 members of the House of Commons, with 72 constituencies being in Scotland.

== Candidates ==
Below is a table summarising the candidates of the 1992 general election in Scotland.

Affiliation	Candidates
Labour Party	72
Conservative and Unionist Party	72
Liberal Democrats	72
Scottish National Party	72
Scottish Green Party	19
Natural Law Party	19
Liberal Party	4 (Note: The candidates that stood were Richard Wilson in Edinburgh Central, Alan R. Fleming in Edinburgh West, David Senior in North East Fife and John Hein in Tweeddale, Ettrick and Lauderdale.)
British National Party	2 (Note: The candidates that stood were Stephen Cartwright in Clydesdale and David J. Bruce in Edinburgh West.)
Independent	2 (Note: The candidates that stood were Graham McLeod in Dumfries and Andrew R. Price in Western Isles.)
Communist Party of Great Britain (PCC)	1 (Note: Candidate Tam Dean Burn stood in Glasgow Central.)
Independent Labour	1 (Note: Candidate Ron Brown in Edinburgh Leith.)
Independent Socialist	1 (Note: Candidate David Lettice stood in Motherwell South.)
International Communist Party	1 (Note: Candidate Barbara Slaughter stood in Glasgow Rutherglen.)
Official Monster Raving Loony Party	1 (Note: Candidate Ross Sharp stood in Stirling.)
Revolutionary Communist Party	1 (Note: Candidate Helen Gold stood in Glasgow Hillhead.)
Scottish Militant Labour	1 (Note: Candidate Tommy Sheridan stood in Glasgow Pollok.)
Total	341

== Analysis ==
Two Scottish seats changed parties during the election; Aberdeen South and Kincardine and Deeside. Both seats were gained by the Conservatives. Kincardine and Deeside had been lost by the Conservatives to the Liberal Democrats in the last by-election of the parliament.

The results of the 1992 election were largely unexpected, and nowhere more-so than in Scotland. Conservative results in Scottish local elections since the 1987 election had been largely poor, and the Conservatives had sunk as low as 15% in a March 1990 opinion poll by the Herald. Polling throughout the campaign had suggested little movement towards the Conservatives, and instead support for Scottish independence appeared to be rising. Local polls in individual constituencies had even suggested that the Secretary of State for Scotland Ian Lang would lose his seat of Galloway and Upper Nithsdale to the SNP and that Under-Secretary of State for Scotland Michael Forsyth would lose Stirling to Labour.

Most surprising was the difference between the Scottish results and the wider UK results. The tendency had historically been for larger swings to Labour in Scotland where there was a national swing to Labour. In 1992 the wider swing in the UK was from the Conservatives to Labour, yet Scotland saw a swing from Labour to the Conservatives. This was the last election until 2017 in which the Conservatives were the second largest party in Scotland (in the election held 25 years later, the Scottish Conservatives were the beneficiaries of a much larger swing against the trend elsewhere in the UK).

== Results summary ==
Party	Seats					Aggregate votes		
Party	Total	Gains	Losses	Net	Of total (%)	Total	Of total (%)	Change (%)
Labour	49	0	1	▼1	68.1	1,142,911	39.0	▼3.4
Conservative	11	1	0	▲1	15.3	751,950	25.6	▲1.6
SNP	3	0	0	Steady	4.2	629,564	21.5	▲7.4
Liberal Democrats	9	0	0	Steady	12.5	383,856	13.1	▼6.1
Green	0	New			—	8,391	0.3	New
Scottish Militant Labour	0	New			—	6,287	0.2	New
Independent Labour	0	Did not stand in 1987			—	4,142	0.1	—N/a
Natural Law	0	New			—	2,095	0.1	New
Independent	0	0	0	Steady	—	803	0.0	Steady
Liberal	0	New			—	769	0.0	New
BNP	0	Did not stand in 1987			—	475	0.0	—N/a
Ind. Socialist	0	New			—	146	0.0	New
Communist (PCC)	0	New			—	106	0.0	New
Revolutionary Communist	0	New			—	73	0.0	New
Monster Raving Loony	0	New			—	68	0.0	New
ICP	0	New			—	62	0.0	New
Total	72			0	100.0	2,931,698	100.0	0.0
Registered voters, and turnout							75.5	▲0.4

Popular vote
Labour	39.0%
Conservative	25.6%
SNP	21.5%
Liberal Democrats	13.1%
Green	0.3%
Other	0.5%

Parliament seats
Labour	68.1%
Conservative	15.3%
Liberal Democrats	12.5%
SNP	4.2%

== See also ==
- 1992 United Kingdom general election in England
- 1992 United Kingdom general election in Northern Ireland
- 1992 United Kingdom general election in Wales
- List of MPs for constituencies in Scotland (1992–1997)
- List of United Kingdom Parliament constituencies (1983–1997) by region
