= 1992 Republic of the Congo constitutional referendum =

- 15 March 1992

Results
Choice	Votes	%
Yes	832,115	96.32%
No	31,774	3.68%
Valid votes	863,889	98.81%
Invalid or blank votes	10,408	1.19%
Total votes	874,297	100.00%
Registered voters/turnout	1,232,384	70.94%

A constitutional referendum was held in the Republic of the Congo on 15 March 1992. The new constitution created a presidential republic with a bicameral parliament and a division of powers between the two. It was approved by 96% of voters with a 70.9% turnout.

== Results ==
Choice	Votes	%
For	832,115	96.32
Against	31,774	3.68
Invalid/blank votes	10,408	-
Total	874,297	100
Source: African Elections Database
