= It's The Sun Wot Won It =

Newspaper headline

Front-page of The Sun from Saturday 11 April 1992

"It's The Sun Wot Won It" is the headline printed on the front page of the British newspaper The Sun on 11 April 1992, in which it claimed credit for the Conservative Party's victory in the 1992 general election. It is regularly cited in debates on the influence of the press over politicians and election results and has become a British political catchphrase.

== Origin ==
The headline refers to The Sun's contribution to the unexpected Conservative victory in the 1992 general election. Owned by Australian-American media mogul Rupert Murdoch, The Sun had been relentless in its drive to turn voters against the Labour Party leader, Neil Kinnock. The Sun, then the tabloid newspaper with the widest circulation in Britain, encouraged its readers to back the Conservatives and published the election day headline "If Kinnock wins today will the last person to leave Britain please turn out the lights", with Kinnock's portrait in a lightbulb. The "lights" headline was an apparent paraphrase of a slogan used by one of Murdoch's newspapers during the 1975 Australian federal election.

The Conservative government's 21-seat majority, gained in the 1992 election represented a large fall from the 102-seat majority achieved at the previous election five years earlier, but the opinion polls in the run-up to the 1992 general election had made it appear that a hung parliament or a narrow Labour majority was the most likely result.

Kinnock himself blamed The Sun and other newspapers sympathetic towards the Conservatives as a major factor in his failure to win the election and bitterly denounced its use of "misinformation and disinformation". Even some Conservatives acknowledged that The Sun contributed to their election triumph, including Margaret Thatcher and Alistair McAlpine. A 1994 report in The Independent argued that The Sun had little effect on the Conservatives getting a larger vote share and that John Major, who had taken office in November 1990, appealed to voters more than Kinnock, who had become overconfident of winning. The public's concern about higher taxes under a Labour government has also been cited as a reason for the Conservative win in 1992.

== Later use ==
Variations of the headline are frequently used in the British media during elections. The phrase was used again by many political commentators following the 1997 general election when The Sun switched sides and supported Labour's new leader Tony Blair, who won the election by a landslide. However, unlike in 1992, opinion polls for most of the inter-election period had consistently suggested that a Labour victory was likely.

In 2004, it was said to be The Guardian "wot lost it" for John Kerry in the United States presidential election: after the newspaper started a letter writing campaign to voters in Ohio urging them to vote for Kerry, the state went for George W. Bush. In the 2008 London mayoral election, it was supposedly the Evening Standard 'wot won it' for Boris Johnson. Also in 2008 The Sun used a variation of the headline for a debate at the Oxford Union over the Page 3 girl claiming 'It's Sun's girls wot won it'.

In a 2008 special pull-out section about green energy, an altered version of the anti-Kinnock headline appeared in The Sun featuring Labour Prime Minister Gordon Brown and the words "Will the last person in Britain to switch to energy-saving bulbs please turn out the old lights" next to an image of Brown's head in a lightbulb.

The headline "will the last person to leave Britain please turn out the lights?" was paraphrased during the News International phone hacking scandal to refer to the closure of the News of the World in July 2011 – a decision made by newspaper owner Rupert Murdoch in a response to the inevitable loss of advertisers and readers that the phonehacking scandal was expected to cause the newspaper.

In April 2012, giving evidence to the Leveson Inquiry, News Corporation chairman Rupert Murdoch described the Sun Wot Won It headline as "tasteless and wrong" and reported giving the then Sun editor Kelvin MacKenzie "a hell of a bollocking."

In the day of the 2019 general election, The Sun revived the "Kinnock lightbulb" frontpage endorsing the Conservatives again, putting Boris Johnson's face in a shining lightbulb, and Jeremy Corbyn's in a turned-off, grey lightbulb surrounded by a grey storm.

"Back in 1992 The Sun famous lightbulb warned of the nightmare of a Neil Kinnock Labour government. That would be a picnic compared with a Corbyn regime [...] Vote Tory and we can move on. Save Brexit. Save Britain."
