= 1992 French regional elections =

- 22 March 1992

26 Regional Presidencies
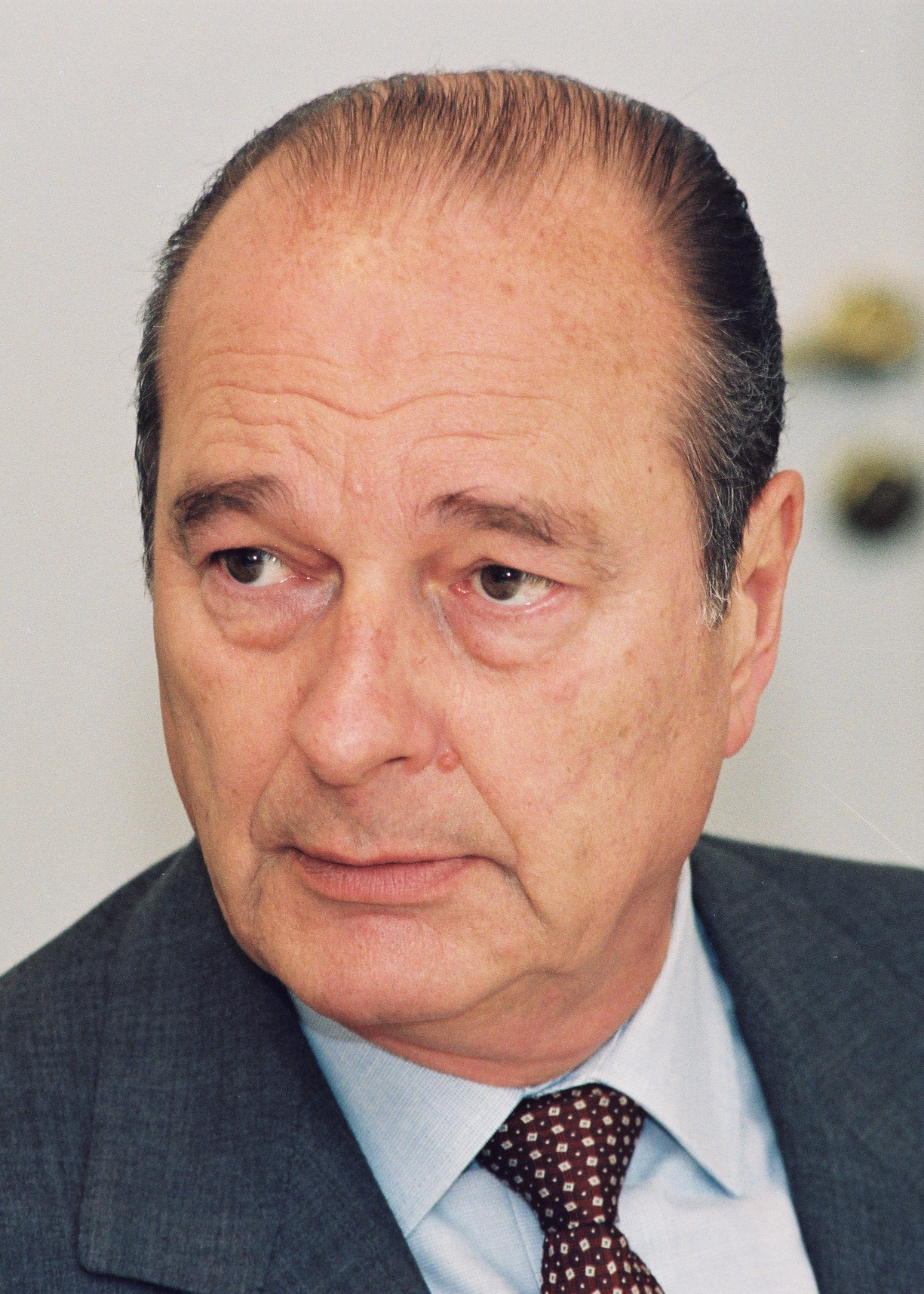

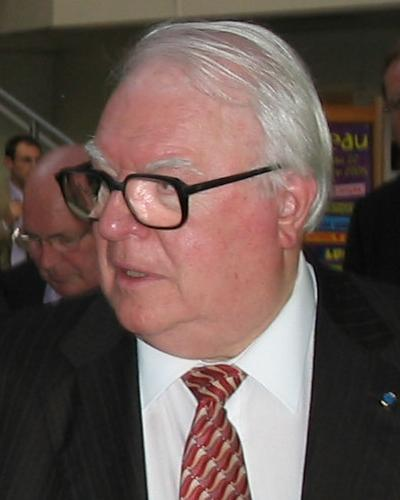

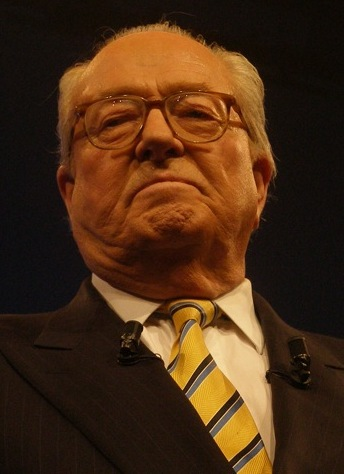
	First party	Second party	Third party
Leader	Jacques Chirac	Pierre Mauroy	Jean-Marie Le Pen
Party	RPR	PS	FN
Regions	21	3	0
Change	Steady	▲2	Steady
Votes	9,366,739	6,024,904	3,380,853
Percentage	38.03%	24.46%	13.72%
- Presidents elected by region: Rally for the Republic; Union for French Democracy; Socialist Party; The Greens; Communist Party of Martinique; FreeDom; Miscellaneous left

Regional elections were held in France on 22 March 1992. At stake were the presidencies of each of France's 26 régions, which, although lacking legislative autonomy, manage sizeable budgets. The parliamentary right, led by the conservative Rally for the Republic and the centre-right Union for French Democracy won a landslide, winning 20 of 22 metropolitan regional presidencies. The Socialists only won the Limousin, while the Greens obtained the presidency of the Nord-Pas de Calais region.

The elections were conducted using the D'Hondt method and a closed list proportional representation, with a threshold of five percent of valid votes being applied regionally.
