= 1977 Castlereagh Borough Council election =

Local government election in Northern Ireland

← 1973	18 May 1977	1981 →

All 19 seats to Castlereagh Borough Council 10 seats needed for a majority
	First party	Second party	Third party
Party	Alliance	UUP	DUP
Seats won	7	6	4
Seat change	▲2	▼4	▲4
	Fourth party	Fifth party	Sixth party
Party	Ind. Unionist	United Loyalist	Loyalist Coalition
Seats won	2	0	0
Seat change	▲2	▼2	▼1
	Seventh party
Party	Independent
Seats won	0
Seat change	▼1

Elections to Castlereagh Borough Council were held on 18 May 1977 on the same day as the other Northern Irish local government elections. The election used three district electoral areas to elect a total of 19 councillors.

== Election results ==
Castlereagh Borough Council Election Result 1977
Party	Seats	Gains	Losses	Net gain/loss	Seats %	Votes %	Votes	+/−
Alliance	7	2	0	▲2	36.8	32.5	6,625	▲10.4
UUP	6	0	4	▼4	31.6	24.8	5,054	▼25.8
DUP	4	4	0	▲4	21.1	18.5	3,909	New
Ind. Unionist	2	2	0	▲2	0.0	12.0	2,542	▲12.0
Vanguard	0	0	0	0	0.0	5.6	1,143	▲4.4
UUUP	0	0	0	0	0.0	2.6	522	New
Unionist Party NI	0	0	0	0	0.0	1.9	380	New
NI Labour	0	0	0	0	0.0	0.8	169	▼4.7
Independent	0	0	1	▼1	0.0	0.1	26	▼3.1

Note: "Votes" are the first preference votes.

== Districts summary ==
Results of the Castlereagh Borough Council election, 1977 by district
Ward	%	Cllrs	%	Cllrs	%	Cllrs	%	Cllrs	Total Cllrs
Ward	Alliance		UUP		DUP		Others		Total Cllrs
Area A	33.7	2	29.7	2	20.5	1	16.1	1	6
Area B	28.8	3	18.4	2	16.4	2	36.4	1	8
Area C	36.3	2	27.6	2	21.5	1	14.6	0	5
Total	32.5	7	24.8	6	18.5	4	24.2	2	19

== Districts results ==
=== Area A ===
1973: 3 x UUP, 2 x Alliance, 1 x United Loyalist
1977: 2 x Alliance, 2 x UUP, 1 x DUP, 1 x Independent Unionist
1973-1977 Change: DUP and Independent Unionist gain from UUP and United Loyalist

Castlereagh Area A - 6 seats
Party	Candidate	FPv%	Count							
Party	Candidate	FPv%	1	2	3	4	5	6	7	8
UUP	Bertie Barker*	12.64%	955	993	1,180					
UUP	Frederick Kane*	9.03%	646	705	978	1,115.46				
Alliance	Thomas Hawthorne*	12.06%	863	879	905	909.35	922.79	1,374.79		
Alliance	Philip Grosse	12.31%	881	886	904	908.35	922.63	1,128.63		
Ind. Unionist	Ernest Harper	11.71%	838	852	862	863.74	883.06	902.84	1,080.84	
DUP	James Lowe	10.93%	782	854	866	867.74	889.58	900.13	921.13	956.13
DUP	William Stevenson	9.53%	682	710	727	728.74	742.18	747.05	784.05	786.05
Alliance	Margaret Hull	9.33%	668	691	704	709.22	719.3			
UUP	William Stewart*	7.31%	523	568						
Vanguard	John Moore	4.44%	318							
Electorate: 14,898 Valid: 7,156 (48.03%) Spoilt: 226 Quota: 1,023 Turnout: 7,382 (49.55%)

=== Area B ===
1973: 4 x UUP, 2 x Alliance, 1 x United Loyalist, 1 x Loyalist Coalition
1977: 3 x Alliance, 2 x UUP, 2 x DUP, 1 x Independent Unionist
1973-1977 Change: DUP (two seats) and Alliance gain from UUP, United Loyalist and Loyalist Coalition

Castlereagh Area B - 8 seats
Party	Candidate	FPv%	Count												
Party	Candidate	FPv%	1	2	3	4	5	6	7	8	9	10	11	12	13
Alliance	Addie Morrow*	11.38%	884												
Alliance	Felicity Boyd	10.85%	843	848.6	849.6	857.66	860.7	862.72	940.76						
UUP	Matthew Anderson	9.00%	699	699.24	699.24	701.26	711.26	722.26	724.26	797.32	800.32	801.34	856.34	887.34	
UUP	Leslie Farrington*	6.45%	501	501.36	501.36	501.38	508.38	512.42	519.42	631.46	632.46	632.5	688.52	715.52	929.52
DUP	John Lamont	5.42%	421	421.02	421.02	421.02	427.02	455.02	456.02	456.04	456.04	663.04	666.06	827.06	859.08
DUP	John Gilpin	6.71%	521	521.02	521.02	522.02	527.02	559.02	562.02	564.04	564.04	691.06	694.06	793.06	842.08
Ind. Unionist	Walter McFarland*	7.23%	562	562.28	563.28	570.3	581.3	589.32	592.32	608.32	608.32	613.34	670.38	737.48	834.52
Alliance	Thomas McQueen	6.59%	512	521.54	521.54	524.64	527.64	532.64	585.66	595.72	661.72	662.72	769.86	775.88	833.9
Ind. Unionist	Robert Allen	6.90%	536	536.06	537.06	537.06	598.06	626.06	637.06	640.06	641.06	644.06	651.06	669.06	688.06
Vanguard	Thomas Lyons	5.70%	443	443.12	443.12	443.14	444.14	451.14	458.14	464.16	464.16	470.16	498.2	527.2	
UUUP	John Scott*	5.25%	408	408.12	408.12	409.12	411.12	437.12	438.12	448.14	448.14	456.14	468.16		
Unionist Party NI	Brent Hughes	3.36%	261	261.28	262.28	348.32	353.32	354.32	365.34	365.36	368.36	370.36			
DUP	John Hill	4.27%	332	332.08	333.08	335.08	344.08	360.08	362.08	362.1	362.1				
UUP	Joseph O'Hara*	2.91%	226	226.28	226.28	230.3	234.3	236.3	238.3						
NI Labour	John Barkley	2.18%	169	169.08	187.08	188.08	189.08	190.08							
Loyalist	Michael Brooks*	2.20%	171	171.1	171.1	173.1	175.1								
Ind. Unionist	Ronald McLean*	1.75%	136	136.04	137.04	137.04									
Unionist Party NI	Pauline Mateer	1.53%	119	119.32	119.32										
Independent	William Copley	0.33%	26	26											
Electorate: 18,946 Valid: 7,770 (41.01%) Spoilt: 329 Quota: 864 Turnout: 8,099 (42.75%)

=== Area C ===
1973: 3 x UUP, 1 x Alliance, 1 x Independent
1977: 2 x Alliance, 2 x UUP, 1 x DUP
1973-1977 Change: Alliance and DUP gain from UUP and Independent

Castlereagh Area C - 5 seats
Party	Candidate	FPv%	Count							
Party	Candidate	FPv%	1	2	3	4	5	6	7	8
UUP	Herbert Johnstone	22.04%	1,200							
DUP	Peter Robinson	21.51%	1,171							
Alliance	Patricia Archer	16.29%	887	891.8	894.56	900.17	918.17			
UUP	Elizabeth Rea	5.58%	304	541.12	578.38	677.24	765.77	766.34	1,090.34	
Alliance	Bryan Davidson	9.74%	530	532.16	532.62	536.08	601.23	608.64	691.83	768.83
Alliance	Samuel Finlay*	10.23%	557	562.28	566.65	572.8	597.72	599.43	665.62	742.62
Vanguard	Norman Kyle	7.02%	382	410.08	441.82	517.26	594.61	595.18		
Ind. Unionist	John Snodden	5.49%	299	301.16	333.36	372.05				
UUUP	Valerie Walsh	2.09%	114	120.96	272.3					
Electorate: 10,932 Valid: 5,444 (49.80%) Spoilt: 175 Quota: 908 Turnout: 5,619 (51.40%)
