= 1981 Castlereagh Borough Council election =

Local government election in Northern Ireland

| ← 1977 | 20 May 1981 | 1985 → |

All 19 seats to Castlereagh Borough Council 10 seats needed for a majority
| | First party | Second party | Third party |
|---|---|---|---|
| Party | DUP | UUP | Alliance |
| Seats won | 9 | 5 | 4 |
| Seat change | ▲5 | ▼1 | ▼3 |
| | Fourth party |
| Party | Ind. Unionist |
| Seats won | 1 |
| Seat change | ▼1 |

Elections to Castlereagh Borough Council were held on 20 May 1981 on the same day as the other Northern Irish local government elections. The election used three district electoral areas to elect a total of 19 councillors.

== Election results ==
Castlereagh Borough Council Election Result 1981
| Party | Seats | Gains | Losses | Net gain/loss | Seats % | Votes % | Votes | +/− |
|---|---|---|---|---|---|---|---|---|
| DUP | 9 | 5 | 0 | ▲5 | 47.4 | 44.8 | 11,307 | ▲25.6 |
| UUP | 5 | 0 | 1 | ▼1 | 26.3 | 25.2 | 6,355 | ▲0.4 |
| Alliance | 4 | 0 | 3 | ▼3 | 21.1 | 21.1 | 5,339 | ▼11.4 |
| Ind. Unionist | 1 | 1 | 2 | ▼1 | 5.3 | 5.0 | 1,261 | ▼4.2 |
| UPUP | 0 | 0 | 0 | ▲0 | 0.0 | 1.7 | 420 | New |
| NI Labour | 0 | 0 | 0 | 0 | 0.0 | 0.7 | 169 | ▼0.1 |

Note: "Votes" are the first preference votes.

== Districts summary ==
Results of the Castlereagh Borough Council election, 1981 by district
| Ward | % | Cllrs | % | Cllrs | % | Cllrs | % | Cllrs | Total Cllrs |
| Ward | DUP | | UUP | | Alliance | | Others | | Total Cllrs |
|---|---|---|---|---|---|---|---|---|---|
| Area A | 33.4 | 2 | 28.8 | 2 | 20.9 | 1 | 16.9 | 1 | 6 |
| Area B | 51.9 | 4 | 24.5 | 2 | 19.9 | 2 | 3.7 | 0 | 8 |
| Area C | 55.3 | 3 | 21.3 | 1 | 23.4 | 1 | 0.0 | 0 | 5 |
| Total | 44.8 | 9 | 25.2 | 5 | 21.1 | 4 | 8.9 | 1 | 19 |

== Districts results ==
=== Area A ===
1977: 2 x Alliance, 2 x UUP, 1 x DUP, 1 x Independent Unionist
1981: 2 x DUP, 2 x UUP, 1 x Alliance, 1 x Independent Unionist
1977-1981 Change: DUP gain from Alliance

Castlereagh Area A - 6 seats
| Party | Candidate | FPv% | Count | | | | | | | |
| Party | Candidate | FPv% | 1 | 2 | 3 | 4 | 5 | 6 | 7 | 8 |
|---|---|---|---|---|---|---|---|---|---|---|
| DUP | Ernest Harper* | 17.81% | 1,555 | | | | | | | |
| UUP | John Glass | 12.64% | 1,104 | 1,109.6 | 1,123.6 | 1,238.8 | 1,250.8 | | | |
| UUP | Frederick Kane* | 9.91% | 865 | 873.6 | 883 | 931.2 | 936.2 | 1,383.2 | | |
| DUP | John Hillis | 6.22% | 543 | 760.8 | 986.4 | 1,066.4 | 1,067.4 | 1,098 | 1,596 | |
| Ind. Unionist | William Clulow | 12.09% | 1,056 | 1,079.2 | 1,094.6 | 1,127.6 | 1,129.6 | 1,172.6 | 1,212.4 | 1,332.4 |
| Alliance | Philip Grosse* | 8.58% | 749 | 750.2 | 752.4 | 766.4 | 1,044.6 | 1,065.8 | 1,074 | 1,107 |
| Alliance | Samuel Finlay | 6.56% | 573 | 574.4 | 575.4 | 586.4 | 791.8 | 802.8 | 811 | 836 |
| DUP | James Lowe* | 5.02% | 438 | 459.8 | 571.4 | 625.6 | 628.6 | 657.6 | | |
| UUP | Bryan Milford | 6.28% | 548 | 555.6 | 563.6 | 593.6 | 600.6 | | | |
| Alliance | Ann Smith | 5.75% | 502 | 502.8 | 502.8 | 521.8 | | | | |
| UPUP | John Moore | 4.81% | 420 | 420.4 | 426.6 | | | | | |
| DUP | Robin Newton | 4.34% | 379 | 400.4 | | | | | | |
Electorate: 14,838 Valid: 8,732 (58.85%) Spoilt: 248 Quota: 1,248 Turnout: 8,980 (60.52%)

=== Area B ===
1977: 3 x Alliance, 2 x UUP, 2 x DUP, 1 x Independent Unionist
1981: 4 x DUP, 2 x UUP, 2 x Alliance
1977-1981 Change: DUP (two seats) gain from Alliance and Independent Unionist

Castlereagh Area B - 8 seats
| Party | Candidate | FPv% | Count | | | | | | | | | | |
| Party | Candidate | FPv% | 1 | 2 | 3 | 4 | 5 | 6 | 7 | 8 | 9 | 10 | 11 |
|---|---|---|---|---|---|---|---|---|---|---|---|---|---|
| DUP | Roy Allen | 31.17% | 3,098 | | | | | | | | | | |
| DUP | John Boyle | 3.49% | 347 | 1,584.6 | | | | | | | | | |
| DUP | Alan Carson | 9.93% | 987 | 1,234.65 | | | | | | | | | |
| DUP | John Gilpin* | 4.47% | 444 | 514.85 | 940.73 | 1,029.63 | 1,038.14 | 1,041.14 | 1,041.14 | 1,049.96 | 1,107.96 | | |
| UUP | William Ward | 9.18% | 912 | 966.6 | 971.54 | 975.74 | 979.04 | 982.34 | 986.34 | 989.34 | 1,014.8 | 1,091.57 | 1,124.57 |
| Alliance | Addie Morrow* | 7.30% | 725 | 753.4 | 736.44 | 737.84 | 737.84 | 739.84 | 788.1 | 804.1 | 816.1 | 824.87 | 1,100.76 |
| Alliance | Felicity Boyd* | 7.47% | 742 | 798.55 | 800.89 | 802.64 | 803.29 | 805.29 | 826.29 | 867.94 | 885.24 | 898.4 | 1,029.48 |
| UUP | Matthew Anderson* | 7.89% | 784 | 903.6 | 906.98 | 909.78 | 911.08 | 912.34 | 917.99 | 926.94 | 952.61 | 1,008.24 | 1,024.12 |
| UUP | Leslie Farrington* | 7.46% | 741 | 752.05 | 756.21 | 757.26 | 757.91 | 759.91 | 763.91 | 765.91 | 796.59 | 844.3 | 855.95 |
| Alliance | Amy McKeown | 3.85% | 383 | 407.7 | 410.82 | 411.52 | 413.82 | 422.82 | 462.82 | 478.82 | 494.98 | 511.45 | |
| DUP | John Lamont* | 2.79% | 277 | 345.9 | 372.94 | 395.34 | 399.16 | 403.72 | 403.72 | 407.02 | 459.24 | | |
| Ind. Unionist | Michael Brooks | 1.95% | 194 | 247.3 | 258.74 | 261.89 | 266.84 | 267.84 | 269.84 | 272.84 | | | |
| NI Labour | James Bate | 0.76% | 76 | 83.8 | 84.58 | 84.93 | 94.58 | 141.58 | 141.58 | | | | |
| Alliance | Samuel Pyper | 1.25% | 124 | 124.65 | 124.91 | 124.91 | 124.91 | 128.91 | | | | | |
| NI Labour | William Gunning | 0.65% | 65 | 68.25 | 69.29 | 69.99 | 83.99 | | | | | | |
| NI Labour | William Copley | 0.28% | 28 | 29.3 | 29.82 | 30.17 | | | | | | | |
| Loyalist | Annetta Hynes | 0.11% | 11 | 24 | 24.52 | 24.87 | | | | | | | |
Electorate: 18,808 Valid: 9,938 (52.84%) Spoilt: 397 Quota: 1,105 Turnout: 10,335 (54.95%)

=== Area C ===
1977: 2 x Alliance, 2 x UUP, 1 x DUP
1981: 3 x DUP, 1 x Alliance, 1 x UUP
1977-1981 Change: DUP (two seats) gain from Alliance and UUP

Castlereagh Area C - 5 seats
| Party | Candidate | FPv% | Count | | | | |
| Party | Candidate | FPv% | 1 | 2 | 3 | 4 | 5 |
|---|---|---|---|---|---|---|---|
| DUP | Peter Robinson* | 45.58% | 3,562 | | | | |
| DUP | Denny Vitty | 0.45% | 35 | 2,062.22 | | | |
| DUP | Cedric Wilson | 0.49% | 38 | 206.36 | 1,149.5 | | |
| UUP | Herbert Johnstone* | 12.67% | 990 | 1,090.05 | 1,100.94 | | |
| Alliance | Patricia Archer* | 13.41% | 1,048 | 1,072.84 | 1,075.15 | 1,078.71 | 1,503.71 |
| UUP | Walter McFarland* | 5.26% | 411 | 495.18 | 503.1 | 550.86 | 577.86 |
| Alliance | Bryan Davidson* | 6.31% | 493 | 521.98 | 525.61 | 528.01 | |
Electorate: 14,751 Valid: 7,815 (52.98%) Spoilt: 220 Quota: 977 Turnout: 8,035 (54.47%)
