= Castlereagh Area C =

District electoral areas in Castlereagh, Northern Ireland

Castlereagh Area C was one of the three district electoral areas in Castlereagh, Northern Ireland which existed from 1973 to 1985. The district elected five members to Castlereagh Borough Council, and formed part of the Belfast East constituencies for the Northern Ireland Assembly and UK Parliament.

It was created for the 1973 local elections, and contained the wards of Cregagh, Downshire, Hillfoot, Lisnasharragh and Wynchurch. It was abolished for the 1985 local elections and replaced by the Castlereagh Central DEA.

== Councillors ==
Election	Councillor (Party)	Councillor (Party)	Councillor (Party)	Councillor (Party)	Councillor (Party)
1981	Peter Robinson (DUP)	Denny Vitty (DUP)	Cedric Wilson (DUP)	Herbert Johnstone (UUP)	Patricia Archer (Alliance)
1977	Peter Robinson (DUP)	Bryan Davidson (Alliance)	Elizabeth Rea (UUP)	Herbert Johnstone (UUP)	Patricia Archer (Alliance)
1973	C. R. Beacon (Independent)	Walter McFarland (UUP)	J. Black (UUP)	F. H. Gray (UUP)	Samuel Finlay (Alliance)

== 1981 Election ==
1977: 2 x Alliance, 2 x UUP, 1 x DUP

1981: 3 x DUP, 1 x Alliance, 1 x UUP

1977-1981 Change: DUP (two seats) gain from Alliance and UUP

Castlereagh Area C - 5 seats
Party	Candidate	FPv%	Count				
Party	Candidate	FPv%	1	2	3	4	5
DUP	Peter Robinson*	45.58%	3,562				
DUP	Denny Vitty	0.45%	35	2,062.22			
DUP	Cedric Wilson	0.49%	38	206.36	1,149.5		
UUP	Herbert Johnstone*	12.67%	990	1,090.05	1,100.94		
Alliance	Patricia Archer*	13.41%	1,048	1,072.84	1,075.15	1,078.71	1,503.71
UUP	Walter McFarland*	5.26%	411	495.18	503.1	550.86	577.86
Alliance	Bryan Davidson*	6.31%	493	521.98	525.61	528.01	
Electorate: 14,751 Valid: 7,815 (52.98%) Spoilt: 220 Quota: 977 Turnout: 8,035 (54.47%)

== 1977 Election ==
1973: 3 x UUP, 1 x Alliance, 1 x Independent

1977: 2 x Alliance, 2 x UUP, 1 x DUP

1973-1977 Change: Alliance and DUP gain from UUP and Independent

Castlereagh Area C - 5 seats
Party	Candidate	FPv%	Count							
Party	Candidate	FPv%	1	2	3	4	5	6	7	8
UUP	Herbert Johnstone	22.04%	1,200							
DUP	Peter Robinson	21.51%	1,171							
Alliance	Patricia Archer	16.29%	887	891.8	894.56	900.17	918.17			
UUP	Elizabeth Rea	5.58%	304	541.12	578.38	677.24	765.77	766.34	1,090.34	
Alliance	Bryan Davidson	9.74%	530	532.16	532.62	536.08	601.23	608.64	691.83	768.83
Alliance	Samuel Finlay*	10.23%	557	562.28	566.65	572.8	597.72	599.43	665.62	742.62
Vanguard	Norman Kyle	7.02%	382	410.08	441.82	517.26	594.61	595.18		
Ind. Unionist	John Snodden	5.49%	299	301.16	333.36	372.05				
UUUP	Valerie Walsh	2.09%	114	120.96	272.3					
Electorate: 10,932 Valid: 5,444 (49.80%) Spoilt: 175 Quota: 908 Turnout: 5,619 (51.40%)

== 1973 Election ==
1973: 3 x UUP, 1 x Alliance, 1 x Independent

Castlereagh Area C - 5 seats
Party	Candidate	FPv%	Count							
Party	Candidate	FPv%	1	2	3	4	5	6	7	8
UUP	J. Black	24.24%	1,811							
UUP	Walter McFarland	20.73%	1,549							
Alliance	Samuel Finlay	10.44%	780	798.6	804.87	925.25	1,380.25			
UUP	F. H. Gray	5.94%	444	874.28	1,077.01	1,089.51	1,098.94	1,111.48	1,633.48	
Independent	C. R. Beacon	12.10%	904	940.58	949.13	956.63	995.32	1,031.62	1,157.55	1,400.55
NI Labour	R. Bingham	8.47%	633	641.99	649.78	664.4	712.9	794.74	854.31	922.31
UUP	C. Moore	8.65%	646	702.73	765.81	768.5	772.62	775.26		
Alliance	M. G. McConville	5.94%	444	446.17	446.93	555.93				
Alliance	H. McLernon	3.49%	261	266.89	271.07					
Electorate: 11,051 Valid: 7,472 (67.61%) Spoilt: 99 Quota: 1,246 Turnout: 7,571 (68.51%)
