= Iris Robinson scandal =

Northern Irish political scandal

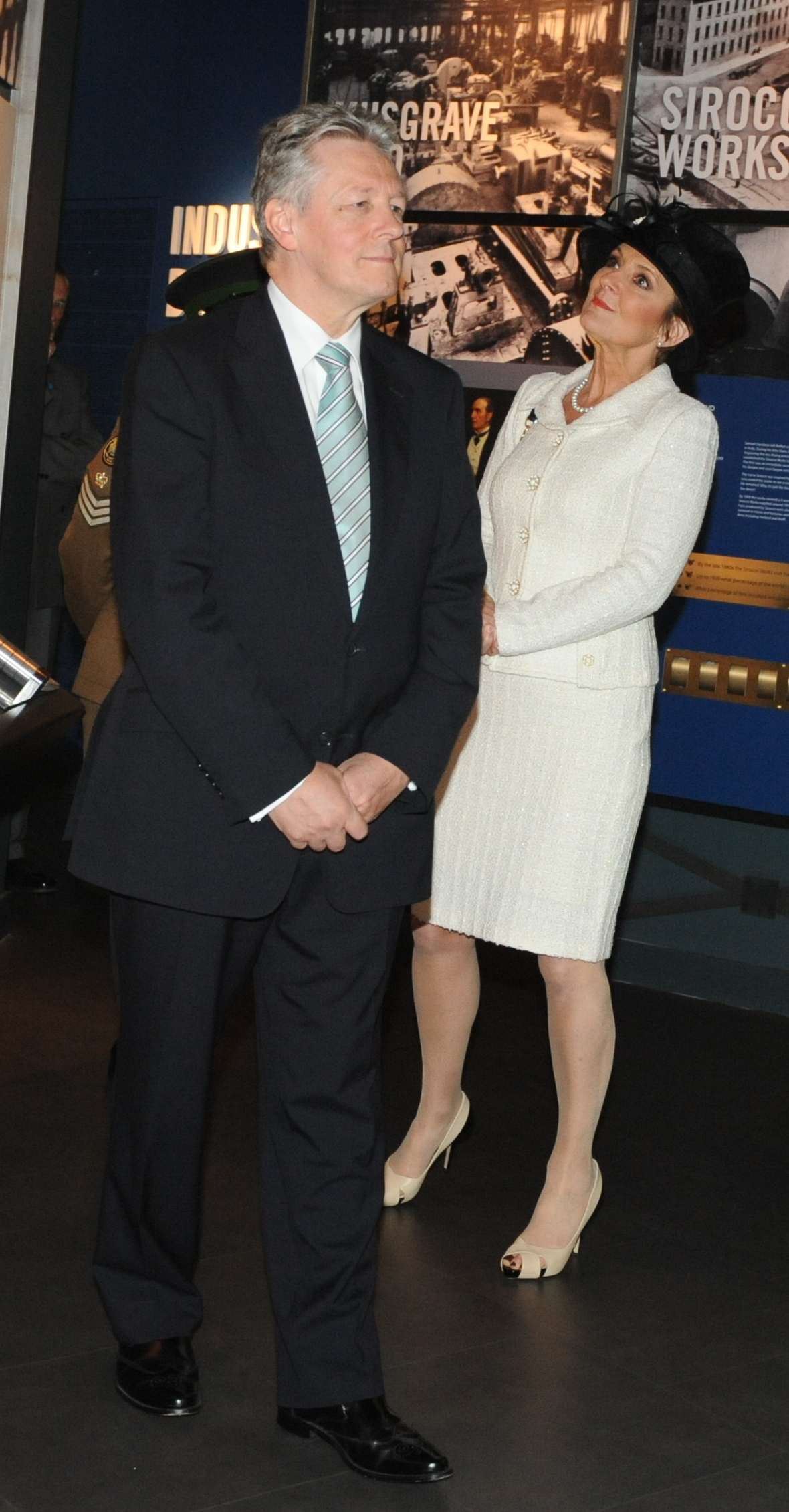
Peter and Iris Robinson pictured together in 2012

The Iris Robinson scandal, also known as Irisgate, was a political scandal in Northern Ireland involving Iris Robinson, the wife of Northern Ireland's First Minister Peter Robinson. She was a serving MP and MLA for the Democratic Unionist Party, representing Strangford in both legislatures.

In January 2010, a BBC Northern Ireland documentary revealed that Iris Robinson had been involved in an extramarital affair in 2008 and had procured £50,000 in loans for her lover to finance a start-up restaurant. She had failed to declare her monetary interest in the restaurant, despite serving on the council which leased the premises to him.

As a result of the restaurant issue, Iris Robinson was expelled from the DUP and she resigned her seats in both Westminster and the Northern Ireland Assembly, retiring from politics. Peter Robinson also unexpectedly lost his own Westminster seat (Belfast East) in the 2010 general election and some media reports attributed the result to the scandal.

== BBC Spotlight ==
Following the airing of an episode of BBC Northern Ireland's Spotlight programme on 8 January, the First Minister faced demands to explain his role in his wife's financial dealings, including from within his own party. The Spotlight investigation revealed that Iris Robinson had procured two loans totalling £50,000 for her then 19-year-old lover Kirk McCambley to assist him in opening a restaurant. The loans were made by local property developers Fred Fraser (who died weeks later) and Ken Campbell. Iris Robinson did not declare the loan to the Northern Ireland Assembly, and McCambley gave £5,000 back to Iris Robinson as a gift to pay off her own debts. In the interview with Spotlight, McCambley alleged that Iris requested the money rather than it being a spontaneous gift. The restaurant in question, the Lock Keeper's Inn in South Belfast, is owned by Castlereagh Borough Council. McCambley was awarded the tender to operate the restaurant in 2008. Despite being a Castlereagh Borough councillor, Iris Robinson failed to declare her financial interest in the award of the tender. Selwyn Black, Iris Robinson's former adviser, has alleged that she encouraged McCambley to bid for the tender.

== First Minister steps down ==
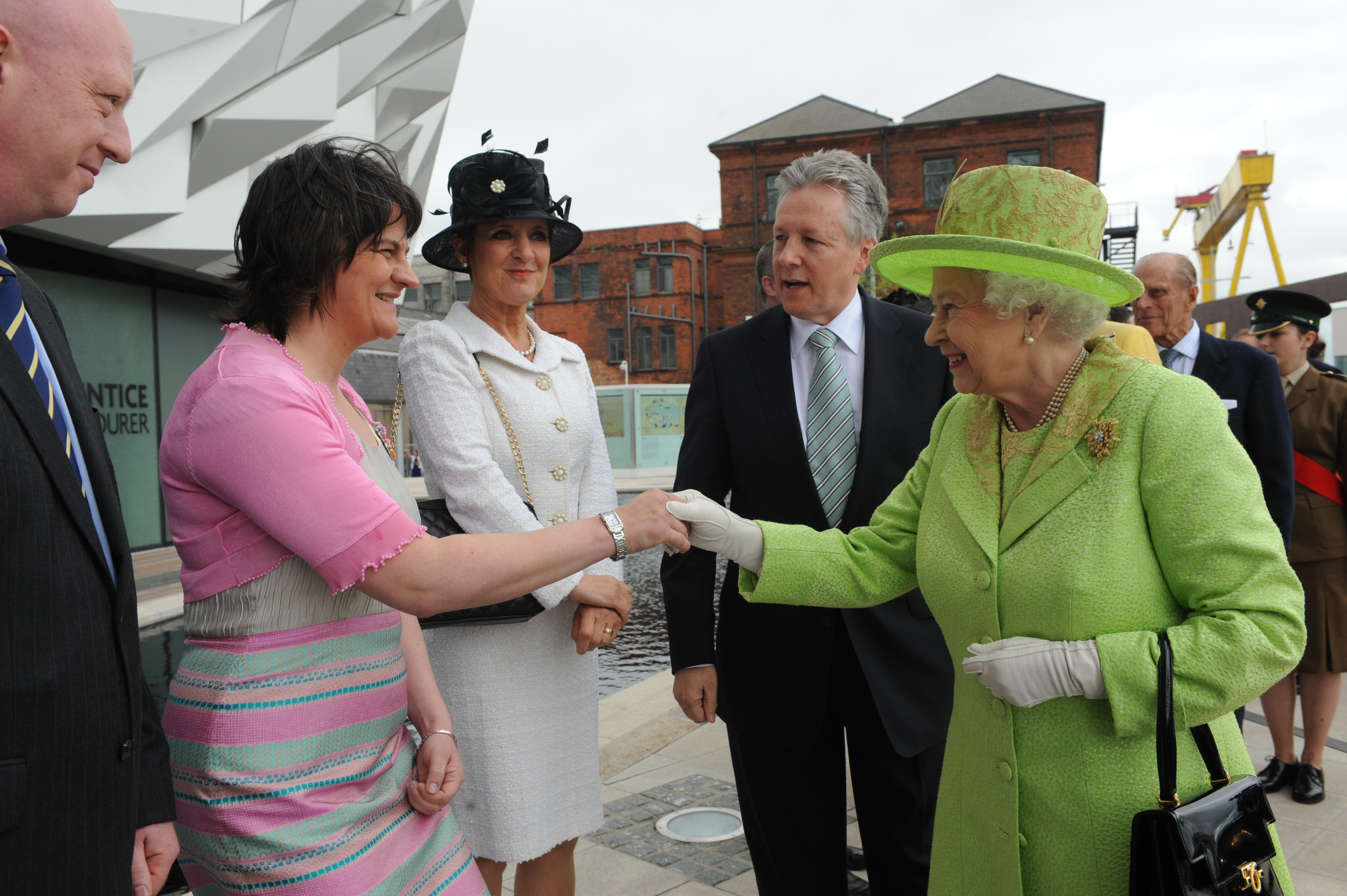
Arlene Foster, Iris Robinson and Peter Robinson meeting Elizabeth II in 2012

On 11 January 2010, Peter Robinson announced that he was stepping down from the position of First Minister for a period of six weeks to fight claims over his wife's financial dealings. Arlene Foster was nominated as his replacement. Peter Robinson faced claims that he didn't tell the proper authorities as soon as he found out that he knew his wife had obtained £50,000 from two developers for her teenage lover. He returned to his position after three weeks.

== Inquiries ==
Peter Robinson said that he would contest the allegations that he failed to properly report these transactions. He claimed to have no knowledge of them. "I had no information," he said. "Absolutely no information about that, nor of any of the other financial arrangements, which is hardly surprising – if somebody is hiding an affair from you, it’s probably not a surprise they are hiding the other arrangements relating to that affair."

On 11 January 2010 Peter Robinson confirmed that he had asked both the House of Commons and the Northern Ireland Assembly to carry out an inquiry into his conduct. Several other inquiries are or will be carried out. Castlereagh (borough) have launched an inquiry, while the Castlereagh Alliance Party has written to the Northern Ireland Comptroller and Auditor General calling for an inquiry.

The Police Service of Northern Ireland announced on 21 January 2010 that it was conducting an investigation into Iris Robinson's financial affairs. Robinson had been receiving psychiatric treatment in a London clinic since January 2010 but returned to Northern Ireland on 19 September 2010 where she continues her treatment.

On 25 June 2010, it became public that Robinson had been interviewed as part of a police investigation over money she obtained from two developers.

On 26 May 2011, the DUP announced the findings of an independent investigation that had been commissioned by the Castlereagh council using Deloitte. This report cleared Iris Robinson of any wrongdoing in connection with the awarding of a contract by the council to her former teenage lover.

While the police investigation into the conduct of the Peter and Iris Robinson concluded in a recommendation not to prosecute in 2011, the Standards and Privileges enquiry mentioned by Peter Robinson on 11 January 2010 had still not been completed some three years after it was ordered by the Assembly. It reported on 28 November 2014, having been delayed in part by Mrs. Robinson's lawyer.

== Timeline ==
- 26 February 2008: Kirk McCambley's father, Billy, dies. Billy was a close friend of Iris Robinson and she had known Kirk from childhood.
- Summer 2008: A sexual relationship has developed between Mrs. Robinson (then 59) and McCambley (then 19).
- June 2008: Mrs. Robinson obtains two loans, worth £25,000 each, from property developers Fred Fraser and Ken Campbell to fund a café business by McCambley. The café is to be in a property owned by Castlereagh (borough), on which Mrs. Robinson is a councillor. McCambley later states that Mrs. Robinson asked him to give her £5,000 of the money. Mrs. Robinson illegally fails to declare the financial dealings to the Northern Ireland Assembly or the House of Commons.
- 28 August 2008: Castlereagh (borough) agree McCambley's café tenancy. Mrs. Robinson is in attendance, but fails to declare her interest.
- Autumn 2008: Relationship between Mrs. Robinson and McCambley ends. Mrs. Robinson asks him to return the money.
- 24 December 2008: Mrs. Robinson, in a text message to her aide Selwyn Black, says she seeks cheques from McCambley, to be paid to her and to her church.
- 1 January 2009: In another text to Black, Mrs. Robinson says she will be repaying Ken Campbell, but not Fred Fraser, who has died by this time.
- 6 January 2009: At Mr. Robinson's prompting (according to Black), Mrs. Robinson now says that all the money will be returned.
- 1 March 2009: Mr. Robinson discovers the affair.
- 2 March 2009: Mrs. Robinson attempts suicide.
- 30 December 2009: Mrs. Robinson announces that she is to retire from politics due to mental illness.
- 7 January 2010: A BBC Northern Ireland programme makes allegations about the financial misdealings and reveals McCambley's identity.
- 11 January 2010: Mr. Robinson announces that he is temporarily standing down as First Minister.
- 13 January 2010: A journalist and a second man are arrested at McCambley's house. Mrs. Robinson formally ceases to be an MP; the DUP say they will not be seeking a by-election before the next General Election. Her resignation from the Northern Ireland Assembly is expected to be formalised on 18 January.
- 22 January 2010: Under new rules, the DUP have been able to nominate Jonathan Bell as a replacement MLA.
- 28 November 2014: Northern Ireland Assembly Committee on Standards and Privileges concludes that Mrs. Robinson committed a "serious breach" of the Assembly's code of conduct, but that Mr. Robinson did not.

== Mistaken identity ==
The Canadian-based crime writer Peter Robinson was mistaken for the other Peter Robinson during this scandal. He received angry e-mails, saying his wife was "homophobic", and he quipped on his website under the title "I’m Not That Peter Robinson", "I guess people who send rude and insulting emails or push religion at the vulnerable were not, alas, at the front of the queue when the brains were handed out".
