= Castlereagh Area B =

District electoral areas in Castlereagh, Northern Ireland

Castlereagh Area B was one of the three district electoral areas in Castlereagh, Northern Ireland which existed from 1973 to 1985. The district elected eight members to Castlereagh Borough Council, and formed part of the Belfast East constituencies for the Northern Ireland Assembly and UK Parliament.

It was created for the 1973 local elections, and contained the wards of Ballyhanwood, Carrowreagh, Dundonald, Enler, Gilnahirk, Lower Braniel, Tullycarnet and Upper Braniel. It was abolished for the 1985 local elections and replaced by the Castlereagh East DEA.

== Councillors ==
Election	Councillor (Party)	Councillor (Party)	Councillor (Party)	Councillor (Party)	Councillor (Party)	Councillor (Party)	Councillor (Party)	Councillor (Party)
1981	John Gilpin (DUP)	Roy Allen (DUP)	John Boyle (DUP)	Alan Carson (DUP)	Matthew Anderson (UUP)	William Ward (UUP)	Felicity Boyd (Alliance)	Addie Morrow (Alliance)
1977	John Gilpin (DUP)	John Lamont (DUP)	Walter McFarland (Independent Unionist)	Leslie Farrington (UUP)	Matthew Anderson (UUP)	Thomas McQueen (Alliance)	Felicity Boyd (Alliance)	Addie Morrow (Alliance)
1973	Michael Brooks (Loyalist Coalition)	John Scott (United Loyalist)	J. G. McKeown (UUP)	Leslie Farrington (UUP)	Ronald McLean (UUP)	Joseph O'Hara (UUP)	Catherine Condy (Alliance)	Addie Morrow (Alliance)

== 1981 Election ==
1977: 3 x Alliance, 2 x UUP, 2 x DUP, 1 x Independent Unionist

1981: 4 x DUP, 2 x UUP, 2 x Alliance

1977-1981 Change: DUP (two seats) gain from Alliance and Independent Unionist

Castlereagh Area B - 8 seats
Party	Candidate	FPv%	Count										
Party	Candidate	FPv%	1	2	3	4	5	6	7	8	9	10	11
DUP	Roy Allen	31.17%	3,098										
DUP	John Boyle	3.49%	347	1,584.6									
DUP	Alan Carson	9.93%	987	1,234.65									
DUP	John Gilpin*	4.47%	444	514.85	940.73	1,029.63	1,038.14	1,041.14	1,041.14	1,049.96	1,107.96		
UUP	William Ward	9.18%	912	966.6	971.54	975.74	979.04	982.34	986.34	989.34	1,014.8	1,091.57	1,124.57
Alliance	Addie Morrow*	7.30%	725	753.4	736.44	737.84	737.84	739.84	788.1	804.1	816.1	824.87	1,100.76
Alliance	Felicity Boyd*	7.47%	742	798.55	800.89	802.64	803.29	805.29	826.29	867.94	885.24	898.4	1,029.48
UUP	Matthew Anderson*	7.89%	784	903.6	906.98	909.78	911.08	912.34	917.99	926.94	952.61	1,008.24	1,024.12
UUP	Leslie Farrington*	7.46%	741	752.05	756.21	757.26	757.91	759.91	763.91	765.91	796.59	844.3	855.95
Alliance	Amy McKeown	3.85%	383	407.7	410.82	411.52	413.82	422.82	462.82	478.82	494.98	511.45	
DUP	John Lamont*	2.79%	277	345.9	372.94	395.34	399.16	403.72	403.72	407.02	459.24		
Ind. Unionist	Michael Brooks	1.95%	194	247.3	258.74	261.89	266.84	267.84	269.84	272.84			
NI Labour	James Bate	0.76%	76	83.8	84.58	84.93	94.58	141.58	141.58				
Alliance	Samuel Pyper	1.25%	124	124.65	124.91	124.91	124.91	128.91					
NI Labour	William Gunning	0.65%	65	68.25	69.29	69.99	83.99						
NI Labour	William Copley	0.28%	28	29.3	29.82	30.17							
Loyalist	Annetta Hynes	0.11%	11	24	24.52	24.87							
Electorate: 18,808 Valid: 9,938 (52.84%) Spoilt: 397 Quota: 1,105 Turnout: 10,335 (54.95%)

== 1977 Election ==
1973: 4 x UUP, 2 x Alliance, 1 x United Loyalist, 1 x Loyalist Coalition

1977: 3 x Alliance, 2 x UUP, 2 x DUP, 1 x Independent Unionist

1973-1977 Change: DUP (two seats) and Alliance gain from UUP, United Loyalist and Loyalist Coalition

Castlereagh Area B - 8 seats
Party	Candidate	FPv%	Count												
Party	Candidate	FPv%	1	2	3	4	5	6	7	8	9	10	11	12	13
Alliance	Addie Morrow*	11.38%	884												
Alliance	Felicity Boyd	10.85%	843	848.6	849.6	857.66	860.7	862.72	940.76						
UUP	Matthew Anderson	9.00%	699	699.24	699.24	701.26	711.26	722.26	724.26	797.32	800.32	801.34	856.34	887.34	
UUP	Leslie Farrington*	6.45%	501	501.36	501.36	501.38	508.38	512.42	519.42	631.46	632.46	632.5	688.52	715.52	929.52
DUP	John Lamont	5.42%	421	421.02	421.02	421.02	427.02	455.02	456.02	456.04	456.04	663.04	666.06	827.06	859.08
DUP	John Gilpin	6.71%	521	521.02	521.02	522.02	527.02	559.02	562.02	564.04	564.04	691.06	694.06	793.06	842.08
Ind. Unionist	Walter McFarland*	7.23%	562	562.28	563.28	570.3	581.3	589.32	592.32	608.32	608.32	613.34	670.38	737.48	834.52
Alliance	Thomas McQueen	6.59%	512	521.54	521.54	524.64	527.64	532.64	585.66	595.72	661.72	662.72	769.86	775.88	833.9
Ind. Unionist	Robert Allen	6.90%	536	536.06	537.06	537.06	598.06	626.06	637.06	640.06	641.06	644.06	651.06	669.06	688.06
Vanguard	Thomas Lyons	5.70%	443	443.12	443.12	443.14	444.14	451.14	458.14	464.16	464.16	470.16	498.2	527.2	
UUUP	John Scott*	5.25%	408	408.12	408.12	409.12	411.12	437.12	438.12	448.14	448.14	456.14	468.16		
Unionist Party NI	Brent Hughes	3.36%	261	261.28	262.28	348.32	353.32	354.32	365.34	365.36	368.36	370.36			
DUP	John Hill	4.27%	332	332.08	333.08	335.08	344.08	360.08	362.08	362.1	362.1				
UUP	Joseph O'Hara*	2.91%	226	226.28	226.28	230.3	234.3	236.3	238.3						
NI Labour	John Barkley	2.18%	169	169.08	187.08	188.08	189.08	190.08							
Loyalist	Michael Brooks*	2.20%	171	171.1	171.1	173.1	175.1								
Ind. Unionist	Ronald McLean*	1.75%	136	136.04	137.04	137.04									
Unionist Party NI	Pauline Mateer	1.53%	119	119.32	119.32										
Independent	William Copley	0.33%	26	26											
Electorate: 18,946 Valid: 7,770 (41.01%) Spoilt: 329 Quota: 864 Turnout: 8,099 (42.75%)

== 1973 Election ==
1973: 4 x UUP, 2 x Alliance, 1 x United Loyalist, 1 x Loyalist Coalition

Castlereagh Area B - 8 seats
Party	Candidate	FPv%	Count											
Party	Candidate	FPv%	1	2	3	4	5	6	7	8	9	10	11	12
UUP	Leslie Farrington	19.75%	2,312											
UUP	J. G. McKeown	12.30%	1,440											
Alliance	Catherine Condy	9.00%	1,053	1,068.48	1,071.18	1,163.22	1,187.22	1,173.74	1,181.83	1,244.53	1,534.53			
Alliance	Addie Morrow	5.70%	667	686.78	690.02	753.54	761.97	765.4	768.92	1,196.06	1,337.06			
Loyalist Coalition	Michael Brooks	9.07%	1,062	1,081.35	1,084.05	1,088.05	1,108.05	1,251.61	1,297.7	1,300.7	1,322.7			
United Loyalist	John Scott	5.87%	687	695.17	696.34	699.34	820.06	842.58	893.44	894.96	899.39	907.39	1,548.39	
UUP	Ronald McLean	3.25%	381	991.17	1,058.31	1,063.98	1,072.07	1,101.4	1,121.39	1,129.34	1,178.6	1,238.6	1,268.81	1,298.51
UUP	Joseph O'Hara	5.90%	691	930.51	972.63	975.49	984.44	998.45	1,022.02	1,038.49	1,056.09	1,110.09	1,143.87	1,190.85
United Loyalist	J. A. Humphreys	5.53%	647	672.37	674.26	676.26	685.26	767.82	860.25	861.25	871.68	882.68	963.92	1,130.78
United Loyalist	James Scott	4.01%	469	475.45	476.89	478.32	572.93	594.36	805.92	809.35	816.35	823.35		
NI Labour	J. Getty	4.61%	540	549.03	550.2	559.76	560.94	565.12	567.21	578.64				
Alliance	W. R. Morrow	6.59%	520	525.59	527.3	534.73	537.73	537.82	537.82					
United Loyalist	G. L. McVeigh	3.23%	378	386.6	387.68	391.68	439.97	462.06						
Vanguard	Thomas Lyons	2.94%	344	353.46	354.63	356.15	357.15							
Unionist Loyalist	P. G. Moles	2.76%	323	327.73	328.27	328.27								
Alliance	Annie Ground	1.64%	192	200.17	201.16									
Electorate: 18,373 Valid: 11,706 (63.71%) Spoilt: 132 Quota: 1,301 Turnout: 11,838 (64.43%)
