= 1973 Castlereagh District Council election =

Local government election in Northern Ireland

1973 Castlereagh Borough Council election
30 May 1973	1977 →

All 19 seats to Castlereagh Borough Council 10 seats needed for a majority
	First party	Second party	Third party
Party	UUP	Alliance	United Loyalist
Seats won	10	5	2
	Fourth party	Fifth party
Party	Loyalist Coalition	Independent
Seats won	1	1

Elections to Castlereagh Borough Council were held on 30 May 1973 on the same day as the other Northern Irish local government elections. The election used three district electoral areas to elect a total of 19 councillors.

== Election results ==
Party	Seats	±	First Pref. votes	FPv%	±%
UUP	10		14,282	50.6	
Alliance	5		6,248	22.1	
United Loyalist	2		3,809	13.5	
Loyalist Coalition	1		1,062	3.8	
Independent	1		902	3.2	
NI Labour	0		1,564	5.5	
Vanguard	0		344	1.2	
Totals	19		28,213	100.0	—

== Districts summary ==
Results of the Castlereagh Borough Council election, 1973 by district
Ward	%	Cllrs	%	Cllrs	%	Cllrs	Total Cllrs
Ward	UUP		Alliance		Others		Total Cllrs
Area A	55.4	3	25.8	2	18.8	1	6
Area B	41.2	4	20.8	2	38.0	2	8
Area C	59.6	3	19.9	2	20.5	1	5
Total	50.6	10	22.1	5	27.3	4	19

== Districts results ==
=== Area A ===
1973: 3 x UUP, 2 x Alliance, 1 x United Loyalist

Castlereagh Area A - 6 seats
Party	Candidate	FPv%	Count							
Party	Candidate	FPv%	1	2	3	4	5	6	7	8
UUP	Frederick Kane	15.10%	1,364							
UUP	Bertie Barker	14.59%	1,318							
United Loyalist	Marlene Currie	14.44%	1,305							
UUP	William Stewart	14.37%	1,298							
Alliance	Thomas Hawthorne	9.53%	861	864.05	965.1	966.1	1,058.26	1,068.05	1,431.05	
Alliance	Sarah Bell	7.70%	696	698.05	838.1	839.72	976.95	991.55	1,201.4	1,335.56
UUP	H. Russell	7.02%	634	652.55	652.65	657.61	684.85	1,131.49	1,145.31	1,148.82
Alliance	F. J. Smith	5.04%	455	456.1	512.15	512.69	589.83	596.36		
UUP	J. Lennon	4.36%	394	435.5	439.75	456.71	494.48			
NI Labour	L. Lannie	4.33%	391	391.9	405.9	406.68				
Alliance	W. Clarke	3.53%	319	319.5						
Electorate: 13,994 Valid: 9,035 (64.56%) Spoilt: 77 Quota: 1,291 Turnout: 9,112 (65.11%)

=== Area B ===
1973: 4 x UUP, 2 x Alliance, 1 x United Loyalist, 1 x Loyalist Coalition

Castlereagh Area B - 8 seats
Party	Candidate	FPv%	Count											
Party	Candidate	FPv%	1	2	3	4	5	6	7	8	9	10	11	12
UUP	Leslie Farrington	19.75%	2,312											
UUP	J. G. McKeown	12.30%	1,440											
Alliance	Catherine Condy	9.00%	1,053	1,068.48	1,071.18	1,163.22	1,187.22	1,173.74	1,181.83	1,244.53	1,534.53			
Alliance	Addie Morrow	5.70%	667	686.78	690.02	753.54	761.97	765.4	768.92	1,196.06	1,337.06			
Loyalist Coalition	Michael Brooks	9.07%	1,062	1,081.35	1,084.05	1,088.05	1,108.05	1,251.61	1,297.7	1,300.7	1,322.7			
United Loyalist	John Scott	5.87%	687	695.17	696.34	699.34	820.06	842.58	893.44	894.96	899.39	907.39	1,548.39	
UUP	Ronald McLean	3.25%	381	991.17	1,058.31	1,063.98	1,072.07	1,101.4	1,121.39	1,129.34	1,178.6	1,238.6	1,268.81	1,298.51
UUP	Joseph O'Hara	5.90%	691	930.51	972.63	975.49	984.44	998.45	1,022.02	1,038.49	1,056.09	1,110.09	1,143.87	1,190.85
United Loyalist	J. A. Humphreys	5.53%	647	672.37	674.26	676.26	685.26	767.82	860.25	861.25	871.68	882.68	963.92	1,130.78
United Loyalist	James Scott	4.01%	469	475.45	476.89	478.32	572.93	594.36	805.92	809.35	816.35	823.35		
NI Labour	J. Getty	4.61%	540	549.03	550.2	559.76	560.94	565.12	567.21	578.64				
Alliance	W. R. Morrow	6.59%	520	525.59	527.3	534.73	537.73	537.82	537.82					
United Loyalist	G. L. McVeigh	3.23%	378	386.6	387.68	391.68	439.97	462.06						
Vanguard	Thomas Lyons	2.94%	344	353.46	354.63	356.15	357.15							
Unionist Loyalist	P. G. Moles	2.76%	323	327.73	328.27	328.27								
Alliance	Annie Ground	1.64%	192	200.17	201.16									
Electorate: 18,373 Valid: 11,706 (63.71%) Spoilt: 132 Quota: 1,301 Turnout: 11,838 (64.43%)

=== Area C ===
1973: 3 x UUP, 1 x Alliance, 1 x Independent

Castlereagh Area C - 5 seats
Party	Candidate	FPv%	Count							
Party	Candidate	FPv%	1	2	3	4	5	6	7	8
UUP	J. Black	24.24%	1,811							
UUP	Walter McFarland	20.73%	1,549							
Alliance	Samuel Finlay	10.44%	780	798.6	804.87	925.25	1,380.25			
UUP	F. H. Gray	5.94%	444	874.28	1,077.01	1,089.51	1,098.94	1,111.48	1,633.48	
Independent	C. R. Beacon	12.10%	904	940.58	949.13	956.63	995.32	1,031.62	1,157.55	1,400.55
NI Labour	R. Bingham	8.47%	633	641.99	649.78	664.4	712.9	794.74	854.31	922.31
UUP	C. Moore	8.65%	646	702.73	765.81	768.5	772.62	775.26		
Alliance	M. G. McConville	5.94%	444	446.17	446.93	555.93				
Alliance	H. McLernon	3.49%	261	266.89	271.07					
Electorate: 11,051 Valid: 7,472 (67.61%) Spoilt: 99 Quota: 1,246 Turnout: 7,571 (68.51%)
