= Mid Down (UK Parliament constituency) =

UK parliamentary constituency in Ireland, 1918–1922

- Former county constituency for the House of Commons
- Major settlements: Holywood

1918–1922
- Seats: 1
- Created from: East Down; North Down; West Down
- Replaced by: Down

Mid Down was a United Kingdom parliamentary constituency in Ireland. It returned one Member of Parliament (MP) to the House of Commons of the United Kingdom from 1918 to 1922, on the electoral system of first past the post.

== Politics ==
The constituency was a strongly unionist area, as demonstrated by the small Sinn Féin vote in 1918. Sinn Féin contested the 1918 general election on an abstentionist platform that instead of taking up any seats they won in the United Kingdom Parliament, they would establish a revolutionary assembly in Dublin. All MPs elected to Irish seats were invited to participate in the First Dáil convened in January 1919; in practice Sinn Féin members did so.

The MP elected in 1918, Sir James Craig, became the Ulster Unionist leader and the first Prime Minister of Northern Ireland in 1921. Having accepted his new office from the Crown on 7 June 1921, Craig's Westminster seat was automatically vacated. He did not seek re-election and a new Unionist MP was elected unopposed.

== Boundaries ==
From 1885 to 1918, the parliamentary county of County Down had been divided into four divisions: North Down, East Down, West Down, and South Down. Under the Redistribution of Seats (Ireland) Act 1918, the parliamentary borough of Newry was absorbed into the parliamentary county, which gained the additional division of Mid Down. This division comprised the central northern part of County Down, to the south-east of the city of Belfast. Prior to the 1918 general election, parts of the area had been included in the East Down, West Down and North Down divisions. The area was defined as:

The rural districts of Castlereagh and Hillsborough; the part of the rural district of Newtownards which consists of the district electoral divisions of Ballygowan, Ballymaglaif, Kilmood, Moneyreagh, and Tullynakill; the part of the rural district of Downpatrick which consists of the district electoral divisions of Ballynahinch, Kilmore, and Leggygowan; and the urban district of Holywood.

The Government of Ireland Act 1920 established the Parliament of Northern Ireland, which came into operation in 1921. The representation of Northern Ireland in the Parliament of the United Kingdom was reduced from 30 MPs to 13 MPs, taking effect at the 1922 United Kingdom general election. Down was re-established as a two-seat county constituency at Westminster.

== Members of Parliament 1918–1922 ==
Election	Member	Party
1918	Sir James Craig, Bt	Irish Unionist
1921 (b)	Robert Gordon Sharman-Crawford	UUP
1922	constituency abolished	

== Elections ==
General Election 14 December 1918: Mid Down
Party	Candidate	Votes	%	±%
Irish Unionist	Sir James Craig, Bt	10,639	93.77	
Sinn Féin	Joseph Robinson	707	6.23	
Majority		9,932	87.54	
Turnout		17,195	65.98	
Irish Unionist win (new seat)				

- Appointment of Craig as Prime Minister of Northern Ireland

By-Election 2 July 1921: Mid Down
Party	Candidate	Votes	%	±%
UUP	Rt Hon. Robert Gordon Sharman-Crawford	Unopposed	N/A	N/A
UUP hold				

== Sources ==
- Walker, Brian M., ed. (1978). Parliamentary Election Results in Ireland, 1801–1922. Dublin: Royal Irish Academy. p. 388. ISBN 0901714127.
- Stenton, M.; Lees, S., eds. (1979). Who's Who of British members of parliament: Volume III 1919–1945. The Harvester Press.
- Leigh Rayment's Historical List of MPs – Constituencies beginning with "D" (part 3)
