= Edward de Cobain =

Politician from Belfast, Northern Ireland

Member of Parliament for Belfast East
- In office 18 December 1885 – 26 February 1892
- Preceded by: Constituency Created
- Succeeded by: Gustav Wilhelm Wolff

Personal details
- Born: 1840 Newry, Ireland
- Died: 23 September 1908 (aged 67–68) Bangor, Ireland
- Party: Ind. Conservative, Irish Conservative then Irish Unionist

Edward Samuel Wesley de Cobain (1840 – 23 September 1908) was an Irish Conservative politician and landowner who sat in the House of Commons from 1885 to 1892. He was expelled from the House for failing to appear to answer charges. He was later imprisoned on charges of gross indecency under the Criminal Law Amendment Act 1885.

De Cobain was the son of the Rev. Edward De Cobain, of Ashley Hall, Belfast and his wife Harriet Ann Smyth, daughter of John Smyth of Smythborough, and the Shades of Ballynure, County Monaghan, Ulster. His brother, Fletcher De Cobain, would also become a minister. ESW De Cobain was educated at Bell's Academy, Belfast. He was cashier for the Borough of Belfast in the 1860s. For five years he was Grand Master of the Orange Lodge of Belfast, and was Deputy Grand Master for Ireland. He was the author of political lectures and occasional poems. In the 1885 general election de Cobain was nominated as the Independent Conservative candidate for East Belfast. He beat the Tory candidate, Sir J. P. Corry, and was elected Member of Parliament for Belfast East. He was reelected in 1886.

== Scandal and imprisonment ==
In April 1891, a warrant was issued by Justice Richard Eaton, Resident Magistrate of Belfast, for his arrest for "the commission of unnatural offences in Belfast" (attempted buggery involving disadvantaged young men). De Cobain had fled to the continent through London to Boulogne-sur-Mer, France. De Cobain continued to proclaim his innocence and refused to resign his seat in Parliament, saying it was tantamount to an admission of guilt. The House of Commons ordered him to attend and when he failed to do so he was expelled on 23 February 1892.

De Cobain sailed to New York in May 1892 where he lived for a while and conducted revivalist meetings in Brooklyn. In February 1893, de Cobain returned to Belfast, where he was subsequently arrested. In court, de Cobain claimed that charges were the result of an attempt to blackmail him but the jury found him guilty and he was sentenced to twelve months' imprisonment with hard labour.

According to the BBC, papers at the Public Record Office of Northern Ireland document allegations that some people were encouraged to give statements against de Cobain, with one allegedly being offered £500. The historian Nicola Morris has stated that "it is not beyond the realms of possibility that there was a set up".

Parliament of the United Kingdom
New constituency	Member of Parliament for Belfast East; 1885 – 1892	Succeeded by Gustav Wilhelm Wolff
