= Robert Sharman-Crawford =

Northern Ireland politician

Member of Parliament for Belfast East
- In office 6 April 1914 – 14 December 1918
- Preceded by: R. J. McMordie
- Succeeded by: Constituency Abolished; Herbert Dixon (1922)

Personal details
- Born: 8 September 1853
- Died: 20 March 1934 (aged 80)
- Resting place: Kilmore Church of Ireland, County Down
- Party: Irish Unionist Alliance
- Children: Terence
- Education: Trinity College, Dublin
- Profession: Soldier

Robert Gordon Sharman-Crawford PC (8 September 1853 – 20 March 1934) was a unionist politician in Northern Ireland.

Sharman-Crawford studied at Trinity College, Dublin before becoming an officer in the British Army and managing the family estates. He served in the 16th Lancers until he resigned from regular service, and on 2 December 1898 was appointed lieutenant-colonel of the 3rd (Militia) battalion of the Royal Irish Rifles. He was granted the honorary rank of colonel on 14 February 1900.

He was elected for the Ulster Unionist Party at the Belfast East by-election in April 1914, although the seat was abolished in 1918. He returned to Parliament at the Mid Down by-election in July 1921 but, the following year, this seat was also abolished. In 1921, he was also elected to the Senate of Northern Ireland, and served until his death in 1934.

Parliament of the United Kingdom
Preceded by R. J. McMordie	Member of Parliament for Belfast East; 1914–1918	Constituency abolished
Preceded by James Craig	Member of Parliament for Mid Down; 1921–1922	Constituency abolished
