= 1892 Belfast East by-election =

UK Parliamentary by-election

The Belfast East by-election of 1892 was held on 9 March 1892 after the incumbent Irish Unionist Party, MP Edward de Cobain, was expelled from the House of Commons of the United Kingdom after a criminal conviction. It was retained by the Irish Unionist Party candidate Gustav Wilhelm Wolff.

In April 1891, a warrant was issued for the arrest of Edward de Cobain for "the commission of unnatural offences in Belfast" and he fled to the continent being seen at one time in Bilbao. He refused to resign his seat, saying it was tantamount to an admission of guilt. The House of Commons ordered him to attend and when he failed to do so he was expelled on 26 February 1892.

Belfast East by-election, 1892
| Party | Candidate | Votes | % | ±% |
|---|---|---|---|---|
| Irish Unionist | Gustav Wilhelm Wolff | 4,746 | 64.6 | −15.7 |
| Ind. Unionist | William Thomas Charley | 2,607 | 35.4 | N/A |
| Majority | | 2,139 | 29.2 | −31.4 |
| Turnout | | 7,353 | 64.8 | −7.8 |
| Registered electors | | 11,339 | | |
| Irish Unionist hold | | Swing | | |
