= Stanley McMaster =

Member of Parliament for Belfast East
- In office 19 March 1959 – 8 February 1974
- Preceded by: Alan McKibbin
- Succeeded by: William Craig

Personal details
- Born: 23 September 1926
- Died: 22 October 1992 (aged 66)
- Party: Ulster Unionist Party
- Profession: Barrister

Stanley Raymond McMaster (23 September 1926 – 20 October 1992) was a Unionist politician in Northern Ireland and a barrister at Lincoln's Inn in London.

He was elected as an Ulster Unionist Party member of parliament for Belfast East at the 1959 by-election. He held the seat until the February 1974 UK general election, when he lost standing as a Pro-Assembly Unionist to the Vanguard leader William Craig.

At the October 1974 UK general election, McMaster stood unsuccessfully as an "Independent Ulster Unionist" candidate in Belfast South, taking third place with 9.8% of the vote.

Parliament of the United Kingdom
Preceded by Alan McKibbin	Member of Parliament for Belfast East; 1959 – February 1974	Succeeded by William Craig
