= R. J. McMordie =

Irish barrister and politician

The Honourable Robert James McMordie QC

Member of Parliament for Belfast East
- In office 19 December 1910 – 25 March 1914
- Preceded by: Gustav Wilhelm Wolff
- Succeeded by: Robert Sharman-Crawford

Lord Mayor of Belfast
- In office 1910–1914
- Preceded by: Sir Robert Anderson
- Succeeded by: Sir Crawford McCullagh

Personal details
- Born: 31 January 1849 Cumran, Ireland
- Died: 25 March 1914 (aged 65) Belfast, Ireland
- Party: Irish Unionist Alliance
- Spouse: Julia Gray
- Children: 2
- Education: Queen's College Belfast
- Profession: Barrister

Robert James McMordie, KC (31 January 1849 – 25 March 1914) was an Irish barrister, politician, and Lord Mayor of Belfast.

Son of the Rev. J A McMordie, he was born in Cumran, County Down, and educated at the Royal Academical Institution, Belfast and Queen's College, Belfast. He received an M.A. from Queen's University. In 1874 he took silk, practising until 1899. In 1885 he married Julia Gray, daughter of Sir William Gray of West Hartlepool, in 1885.

He was a Unionist member of the Belfast Corporation from 1907, serving as the city's Lord Mayor during the turbulent years from 1910 until his sudden death in 1914. Member of parliament for East Belfast from December 1910, McMordie was President of the Irish Industrial Development Association, Belfast. His statue stands in the grounds of Belfast City Hall.

In 1912 he helped to establish the Young Citizen Volunteers of Ireland, an entity which, until its merger into the Ulster Volunteers, spanned much of the province of Ulster from isolated loyalist outposts on the Atlantic coast of County Donegal to East Belfast, a Unionist heartland. The inauguration was in Belfast on 10 September 1912.

"Each member was to pay 2s. 6d. on joining the YCVs and a further 6d. each month: he was to attend weekly drills, there to learn modified military and police drill, single stick, rifle and baton exercises, signalling, knot-tying and other such exercises. If possible he was also to gain some knowledge of life saving and ambulance work..."

Lord Mayor McMordie died at Cabin Hill, Knock, Belfast, aged 65. The hall in Queen's University Students Union was named after him until renamed the Mandela Hall.

== Quote ==
In times of difficulty men had to carry their guns while they followed the plough… the nation or the people that had lost the fighting instinct was sure to be swamped by others who possessed that instinct.

== Portrayals ==
- Michael Grennell (2012) - Titanic: Blood and Steel: Episode 8: High Stakes; TV series

Civic offices
Preceded by Sir Robert Anderson	Lord Mayor of Belfast; 1910 – 1914	Succeeded by Crawford McCullagh
Parliament of the United Kingdom
Preceded by Gustav Wilhelm Wolff	Member of Parliament for Belfast East; December 1910–1914	Succeeded by Robert Sharman-Crawford
