= Alan McKibbin =

Colonel Alan McKibbin OBE JP DL MP
- Born: 3 February 1892; Belfast, Ireland
- Died: 2 December 1958 (aged 66); London, England
- Military career
- Allegiance: United Kingdom
- Branch: British Army
- Rank: Colonel
- Conflicts: First World War; Second World War
- Other work: Member of Parliament

Member of Parliament for Belfast East
- In office 23 February 1950 – 2 December 1958
- Preceded by: Thomas Loftus Cole
- Succeeded by: Stanley McMaster

Personal details
- Party: Ulster Unionist Party

Alan John McKibbin (2 February 1892 – 2 December 1958) was a Northern Irish company director and politician. After serving in the First World War, he later took charge of the Army Cadet Force in Northern Ireland, and also ran the family estate agency firm. He was also an Ulster Unionist Party Member of the Parliament of the United Kingdom from 1950 until his death.

== Wartime service ==
McKibbin was the son of John McKibbin, who ran John McKibbin & Son Ltd. He was born in Belfast and was sent to Campbell College, a leading grammar school in the city. He went to work in the family firm, but on the outbreak of the First World War he enlisted in the British Army. He served throughout the war. In 1922 he married Kathleen Laura Brennan, and they had a son together.

After working in the family firm, McKibbin joined the Home Guard during the Second World War. He was commissioned into the Northern Ireland Army Cadet Force in December 1943, becoming commandant of the Third Cadet Battalion of The Royal Ulster Rifles, and was awarded the OBE in 1949.

== Member of Parliament ==
At the 1950 general election, McKibbin was elected as an Ulster Unionist Party member to the United Kingdom Parliament from the constituency of Belfast East. His maiden speech on 20 March 1950 highlighted the disparity in pay between Army soldiers and munitions factory workers, arguing that it explained the scarcity of army recruits. In March 1951 he initiated a debate calling for additional recruitment of soldiers from British dominions and colonies overseas, on the ground that it allowed the build-up of a voluntary force which could relieve British troops.

== Aircraft industry ==
In the early 1950s he tried to defend Short Brothers from the loss of work due to the suspension of work on the de Havilland Comet airliner, which had suffered a series of disasters. The Minister of Supply agreed to try to bring forward other contracts. Support for the local aircraft industry became a regular subject for him to raise. He also pressed for an increase in pensions payable to the disabled, saying that anything less than 90s. per week would be regarded as an instalment by the Royal British Legion in Northern Ireland. In the 1955 budget, he put down an amendment to exempt vehicles used by limbless ex-servicemen from purchase tax.

McKibbin was appointed a justice of the peace and a deputy lieutenant for Belfast in 1955. Early the next year, he began a campaign to prevent civilian airliners from colliding with military aircraft, after an incident in which disaster was only narrowly avoided. He obtained a pledge to review the rules. McKibbin caused amusement in the House of Commons in 1957 when arguing for a reduction in taxation on musical instruments, he reported that a euphonium had been described to him as "the brass band's revenge for the bagpipes".

== Army Cadet Force ==
In 1957 McKibbin was made hon. Colonel of the Army Cadet Force in Belfast, Antrim and North Down, and also became Chairman of the Army Cadet Force Association. He signed a motion critical of the conduct of the press after the Munich air disaster in 1958. McKibbin died suddenly in a London hospital in December 1958.

Parliament of the United Kingdom
Preceded by Thomas Loftus Cole	Member of Parliament for Belfast East; 1950–1958	Succeeded by Stanley McMaster
