= 1921 Mid Down by-election =

UK Parliamentary by-election

The 1921 Mid Down by-election was held on 2 July 1921. The by-election was held due to the incumbent Ulster Unionist MP, James Craig, being elected Prime Minister of Northern Ireland. It was won by the UUP candidate Robert Sharman-Crawford.
