= Gustav Christian Schwabe =

German British businessman (1813–1897)

- Born: 10 May 1813; Hamburg, Bouches-de-l'Elbe, First French Empire (now Germany)
- Died: 10 January 1897 (aged 83); London, United Kingdom
- Occupations: Merchant, financier
- Known for: Financing Thomas Henry Ismay's venture, the White Star Line
- Spouse: Helen Dugdale (m. 1842)

Gustav Christian Schwabe (10 May 1813 – 10 January 1897) was a German-born British merchant and financier who funded companies such as John Bibby & Sons, Harland and Wolff and the White Star Line. Born in Hamburg, Germany, Schwabe moved to Liverpool in 1838 and spent his working life there. Later, Schwabe would spend more time at his house in London, and retired in 1893.

== Early life ==
Gustav Schwabe was born in Hamburg, Germany, to Philipp Benjamin Schwabe, a Jewish merchant, and his second wife, Rosalie Levi. Gustav had three brothers and a half-brother named Ludwig Philipp from his father's previous marriage. In June 1819, when Gustav was aged six, the family was forced to convert to Lutheranism and Gustav was baptised into the Church.

On 1 January 1834, Schwabe became a partner at Boustead and Company; the firm was renamed Boustead, Schwabe and Company, and Schwabe remained involved at the company for 14 years.

Schwabe moved to Liverpool in 1838 and started a partnership with Edward Little in a company of commission agents; Little died the following year, apparently leaving Schwabe his house and assets. The house was Handstyle House in West Derby, where Little died on 3 December 1840, and where Schwabe resided in 1860.

== Career ==
In May 1842, Schwabe married Helen Dugdale, who was from the Wirral. Her father was John Dugdale, a businessman in Liverpool and Manchester. Schwabe then entered a partnership with his father-in-law, Benjamin Rutter, and Adam Sykes, forming the merchant company Sykes, Schwabe & Co. On 31 December 1853, the partnership was dissolved.

In the 1840s, Schwabe became a junior partner in John Bibby & Sons, a shipping company based in Liverpool. Around the same period, Schwabe met Edward Harland during Harland's apprenticeship in Newcastle upon Tyne at Robert Stephenson and Company. Schwabe arranged for Harland to be employed at the marine engineers J. & G. Thomson, who were building ships for John Bibby & Sons.

Gustav Wilhelm Wolff, Schwabe's nephew, who would later go into partnership with Harland, left Hamburg in 1849 to live with Schwabe in Liverpool. In 1858, Schwabe financially assisted Edward Harland's purchase of Robert Hickson's shipyard at Queen's Island, Belfast.

Schwabe, with Thomas Henry Ismay, purchased the bankrupt White Star Line in 1867. In 1869, during a game of billiards, Schwabe made a deal with Thomas Henry Ismay to finance the White Star Line, provided that the White Star Line would buy its ships from Harland and Wolff. Schwabe also convinced Ismay to compete with Cunard in North Atlantic passenger shipping. Schwabe also financially supported Albert Ballin, the managing director of the Hamburg America Line.

== Later life ==
In October 1886, Schwabe donated 128 paintings to the Kunsthalle Hamburg, an art museum in his native Hamburg; afterwards he was nominated honorary citizen of the city. Due to the Kunsthalle being too small to hold his paintings, Schwabe also donated 120,000 Marks to be used to extend the building. Two years later, the city of Hamburg unveiled a bust of Schwabe.

In later life Schwabe began to spend less time with his business interests in textiles and shipping and stayed at his home in London more often; in 1893, Schwabe began his retirement.

Schwabe died on 10 January 1897 at his home, No. 19 Kensington Palace Gardens, London. Schwabe left no children, and his legacy was distributed among his nieces and nephews.
