= John Campbell (Labour politician) =

Politician from Northern Ireland

John Campbell (? – 2 January 1937) was a labour movement activist in Northern Ireland who served as secretary of the Northern Ireland Labour Party (NILP).

Born into a Catholic family, Campbell worked in the sheet-metal department of a shipyard in Belfast and was active in the National Union of Sheet Metal Workers and Braziers, chairing its Belfast branch from the mid-1910s. Through this, he was prominent on Belfast Trades Council, serving as its vice-chairman. He became involved in the National Council for Civil Liberties' 1930s protests against the Civil Authorities (Special Powers) Act (Northern Ireland) 1922 and, as a result, was sacked from his job at the shipyard.

Campbell was also active in the NILP, and served as its secretary from the late 1920s until his death in 1937. He was elected to represent Dock ward on Belfast Corporation, and stood unsuccessfully in Belfast East at the 1931 UK general election.

Party political offices
Preceded by Sam Haslett	Secretary of the Northern Ireland Labour Party; 1929–1937	Succeeded by Joseph Corrigan
