= Gustav Wilhelm Wolff =

British shipbuilder and politician

Gustav Wilhelm Nilson Wolff
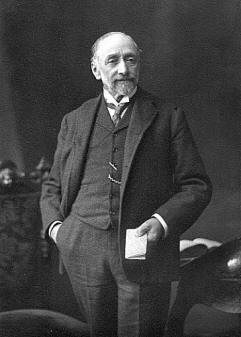

Member of Parliament for Belfast East
- In office 9 March 1892 – 3 December 1910
- Preceded by: Edward de Cobain
- Succeeded by: R. J. McMordie

Personal details
- Born: 14 November 1834 Hamburg, German Confederation (now Germany)
- Died: 17 April 1913 (aged 78) London, England
- Resting place: Brompton Cemetery; 51°29′0″N 0°11′21″W
- Party: Irish Unionist (Conservative Party)
- Education: Liverpool College
- Occupation: Shipbuilder; Businessman
- Known for: Co-founder of Harland and Wolff

Gustav Wilhelm Wolff (14 November 1834 – 17 April 1913) was a German-born British shipbuilder and politician. Born in Hamburg, he moved to Liverpool in 1849 to live with his uncle, Gustav Christian Schwabe. After serving his apprenticeship in Manchester, Wolff was employed as a draughtsman in Hyde, Greater Manchester, before being employed by the shipbuilder Edward Harland in Belfast as his personal assistant. In 1861, Wolff became a partner at Harland's firm, forming Harland and Wolff. Outside shipbuilding, Wolff served as a Belfast Harbour Commissioner. He also founded the Belfast Ropeworks, served as Member of Parliament for Belfast East for 18 years and as a member of the Conservative and Unionist Party and Irish and Ulster Unionist parties.

== Early life ==
Gustav Wilhelm Wolff was born on 14 November 1834 in Hamburg to Moritz Wolff, a merchant and his wife, Fanny Schwabe. Gustav was brought up in the Lutheran Church as his family had converted from Judaism in 1819. In March 1850 aged 15, Wolff left Hamburg to live in Liverpool with his uncle, Gustav Christian Schwabe, a financier. Wolff was educated at Liverpool College; afterwards he served an apprenticeship at the engineers Joseph Whitworth and Company, in Manchester. The firm considered Wolff so able that he was chosen to represent the company at the 1855 Paris Exhibition. After serving his apprenticeship, Wolff was employed by the B. Goodfellow Ltd., a firm based in Hyde, Greater Manchester as a draughtsman. In 1857, due to the intervention of his uncle Gustav Christian Schwabe, Wolff was employed as Edward Harland's personal assistant at Robert Hickson's shipyard at Queen's Island in Belfast. In 1860, Edward Harland recruited Wolff as his business partner, and Harland and Wolff was formed.

== Career at Harland and Wolff ==
Wolff's early role at Harland and Wolff involved his engineering and managing the yard. Due to Wolff's German Jewish descent, he had links with the Jewish community in Hamburg and in Britain, and was able to attract business to the shipyard. Wolff worked extensively at the yard, and was partly responsible for building of the engine works at Harland and Wolff in 1880. His company was responsible for the construction of the RMS Titanic. After the conversion of Harland and Wolff to limited company status in 1888, Wolff was appointed as a director. Wolff was able to secure a good relationship with the Hamburg America Line, which was managed by Albert Ballin, who was also of Jewish background. Wolff officially retired from Harland and Wolff in 1906, although he had not been an active in the business for years beforehand. William James Pirrie who became a partner in 1874 was now the most active. Wolff claimed of the business relationship at Harland and Wolff:

Sir Edward [Harland] builds the ships, Mr Pirrie makes the speeches, and, as for me, I smoke the cigars.

— Gustav Wilhelm Wolff,

== Outside interests and later life ==
Wolff had business interests outside Harland and Wolff, including the Belfast Ropeworks, which he founded in the early 1870s with W.H. Smiles, who was the son of Samuel Smiles, a Scottish author. With Wolff as chairman, the firm became one of the largest ropeworks in the world, challenging the Gourock Ropework Company, who were based on the River Clyde in Scotland. Wolff also bought shares in the Union Steamship Company, and became a director; with his influence, he ensured Harland and Wolff received regular orders from the Union Steamship Company. After Wolff's negotiation, the Union Steamship Company merged in 1900 with the Castle Line, which was owned by Donald Currie; the new company formed was the Union-Castle Line.

Outside business, Gustav Wolff served as a Belfast harbour commissioner from 1887 to 1893. Wolff, like Edward Harland, served as a Member of Parliament as a member of the Conservative and Unionist Party. Edward Harland and Gustav Wolff were known in the House of Commons as "Majestic" and "Teutonic", the names of two ships that the company built. Wolff was the Member of Parliament for Belfast East from March 1892 to December 1910. He replaced Edward de Cobain who had been expelled from the House of Commons and was later jailed for homosexual offences. Wolff only faced election once; in the 1892 by-election Sir William Charley, Q.C., stood against Wolff as an Independent Conservative. Wolff defeated Charley by a margin of over 2100 votes. Wolff was then returned unopposed until his retirement from parliament in 1910. Afterwards, Wolff was made a freeman of Belfast by the Belfast Corporation. In Parliament, Wolff strongly opposed the Irish Home Rule bills.

Wolff was a member of the Church of Ireland. He also gave money to local causes, including the Ulster Hospital and the Orange Order.

Wolff was a member of many different clubs, including the Carlton Club and the Garrick Club. After his retirement from Parliament, Wolff lived almost exclusively in London, where he died on 17 April 1913 at his home, 42 Park Street.

== Death ==
Wolff did not marry and died a bachelor, apart from Irish effects, his English effects were publicly sworn at £9,800 (equivalent to £978,000 in 2025) and his executors were a solicitor and a relative, Frederick Albert Wolff May. Amongst his bequests was £200 to Letitia Alice Walkington, the first woman to graduate with a degree of Bachelor of Laws in Great Britain or Ireland.

== Footnotes ==
Parliament of the United Kingdom
Preceded by Edward Samuel Wesley de Cobain	Member of Parliament for Belfast East; 1892 – December 1910	Succeeded by R. J. McMordie
