= Castlereagh Area A =

District electoral areas in Castlereagh, Northern Ireland

Castlereagh Area A was one of the three district electoral areas in Castlereagh, Northern Ireland which existed from 1973 to 1985. The district elected six members to Castlereagh Borough Council, and formed part of the Belfast South constituencies for the Northern Ireland Assembly and UK Parliament.

It was created for the 1973 local elections, and contained the wards of Beechill, Carryduff, Four Winds, Minnowburn, Moneyreagh and Newtownbreda. It was abolished for the 1985 local elections and replaced by the Castlereagh South DEA.

== Councillors ==
Election	Councillor (Party)	Councillor (Party)	Councillor (Party)	Councillor (Party)	Councillor (Party)	Councillor (Party)
1981	William Clulow (Independent Unionist)	Ernest Harper (DUP)/ (Independent Unionist)	John Hillis (DUP)	Frederick Kane (UUP)	John Glass (UUP)	Philip Grosse (Alliance)
1977	Thomas Hawthorne (Alliance)	Ernest Harper (DUP)/ (Independent Unionist)	James Lowe (DUP)	Frederick Kane (UUP)	Bertie Barker (UUP)	Philip Grosse (Alliance)
1973	Thomas Hawthorne (Alliance)	Marlene Currie (United Loyalist)	William Stewart (UUP)	Frederick Kane (UUP)	Bertie Barker (UUP)	Sarah Bell (Alliance)

== 1981 Election ==
1977: 2 x Alliance, 2 x UUP, 1 x DUP, 1 x Independent Unionist

1981: 2 x DUP, 2 x UUP, 1 x Alliance, 1 x Independent Unionist

1977-1981 Change: DUP gain from Alliance

Castlereagh Area A - 6 seats
Party	Candidate	FPv%	Count							
Party	Candidate	FPv%	1	2	3	4	5	6	7	8
DUP	Ernest Harper*	17.81%	1,555							
UUP	John Glass	12.64%	1,104	1,109.6	1,123.6	1,238.8	1,250.8			
UUP	Frederick Kane*	9.91%	865	873.6	883	931.2	936.2	1,383.2		
DUP	John Hillis	6.22%	543	760.8	986.4	1,066.4	1,067.4	1,098	1,596	
Ind. Unionist	William Clulow	12.09%	1,056	1,079.2	1,094.6	1,127.6	1,129.6	1,172.6	1,212.4	1,332.4
Alliance	Philip Grosse*	8.58%	749	750.2	752.4	766.4	1,044.6	1,065.8	1,074	1,107
Alliance	Samuel Finlay	6.56%	573	574.4	575.4	586.4	791.8	802.8	811	836
DUP	James Lowe*	5.02%	438	459.8	571.4	625.6	628.6	657.6		
UUP	Bryan Milford	6.28%	548	555.6	563.6	593.6	600.6			
Alliance	Ann Smith	5.75%	502	502.8	502.8	521.8				
UPUP	John Moore	4.81%	420	420.4	426.6					
DUP	Robin Newton	4.34%	379	400.4						
Electorate: 14,838 Valid: 8,732 (58.85%) Spoilt: 248 Quota: 1,248 Turnout: 8,980 (60.52%)

== 1977 Election ==
1973: 3 x UUP, 2 x Alliance, 1 x United Loyalist

1977: 2 x Alliance, 2 x UUP, 1 x DUP, 1 x Independent Unionist

1973-1977 Change: DUP and Independent Unionist gain from UUP and United Loyalist

Castlereagh Area A - 6 seats
Party	Candidate	FPv%	Count							
Party	Candidate	FPv%	1	2	3	4	5	6	7	8
UUP	Bertie Barker*	12.64%	955	993	1,180					
UUP	Frederick Kane*	9.03%	646	705	978	1,115.46				
Alliance	Thomas Hawthorne*	12.06%	863	879	905	909.35	922.79	1,374.79		
Alliance	Philip Grosse	12.31%	881	886	904	908.35	922.63	1,128.63		
Ind. Unionist	Ernest Harper	11.71%	838	852	862	863.74	883.06	902.84	1,080.84	
DUP	James Lowe	10.93%	782	854	866	867.74	889.58	900.13	921.13	956.13
DUP	William Stevenson	9.53%	682	710	727	728.74	742.18	747.05	784.05	786.05
Alliance	Margaret Hull	9.33%	668	691	704	709.22	719.3			
UUP	William Stewart*	7.31%	523	568						
Vanguard	John Moore	4.44%	318							
Electorate: 14,898 Valid: 7,156 (48.03%) Spoilt: 226 Quota: 1,023 Turnout: 7,382 (49.55%)

== 1973 Election ==
1973: 3 x UUP, 2 x Alliance, 1 x United Loyalist

Castlereagh Area A - 6 seats
Party	Candidate	FPv%	Count							
Party	Candidate	FPv%	1	2	3	4	5	6	7	8
UUP	Frederick Kane	15.10%	1,364							
UUP	Bertie Barker	14.59%	1,318							
United Loyalist	Marlene Currie	14.44%	1,305							
UUP	William Stewart	14.37%	1,298							
Alliance	Thomas Hawthorne	9.53%	861	864.05	965.1	966.1	1,058.26	1,068.05	1,431.05	
Alliance	Sarah Bell	7.70%	696	698.05	838.1	839.72	976.95	991.55	1,201.4	1,335.56
UUP	H. Russell	7.02%	634	652.55	652.65	657.61	684.85	1,131.49	1,145.31	1,148.82
Alliance	F. J. Smith	5.04%	455	456.1	512.15	512.69	589.83	596.36		
UUP	J. Lennon	4.36%	394	435.5	439.75	456.71	494.48			
NI Labour	L. Lannie	4.33%	391	391.9	405.9	406.68				
Alliance	W. Clarke	3.53%	319	319.5						
Electorate: 13,994 Valid: 9,035 (64.56%) Spoilt: 77 Quota: 1,291 Turnout: 9,112 (65.11%)
