= 1914 Belfast East by-election =

UK Parliamentary by-election

The 1914 Belfast East by-election was held on 6 April 1914. The by-election was held due to the death of the incumbent Irish Unionist MP, R. J. McMordie. It was won by the Irish Unionist candidate Robert Sharman-Crawford, who was unopposed.

== Result ==
1914 Belfast East by-election
Party	Candidate	Votes	%	±%
Irish Unionist	Robert Sharman-Crawford	Unopposed		
Registered electors				
Irish Unionist hold				
