= 1959 Belfast East by-election =

UK parliamentary by-election

The 1959 Belfast East by-election of 19 March 1959 was held after the death of Ulster Unionist Party member of parliament Alan McKibbin.

The seat was safe, having been won by Unionists at the 1955 United Kingdom general election by nearly 14,000 votes

== Result of the previous general election ==
General election 1955: Belfast East
Party	Candidate	Votes	%	±%
UUP	Alan McKibbin	26,938	62.5	+0.8
NI Labour	Tom Boyd	13,041	30.2	−8.1
Sinn Féin	Liam Mulcahy	3,156	7.3	New
Majority		13,897	32.3	+8.9
Turnout		43,135	70.4	−4.1
Registered electors		61,258		
UUP hold		Swing		

== Result of the by-election ==
1959 Belfast East by-election
Party	Candidate	Votes	%	±%
UUP	Stanley McMaster	19,524	57.8	−4.7
NI Labour	James Gardner	14,264	42.2	+10.0
Majority		5,260	15.6	−16.7
Turnout		33,788	57.9	−12.5
Registered electors		58,388		
UUP hold		Swing		
