= Peter Robinson (Northern Ireland politician) =

Northern Irish politician (born 1948)

The Right Honourable Peter Robinson
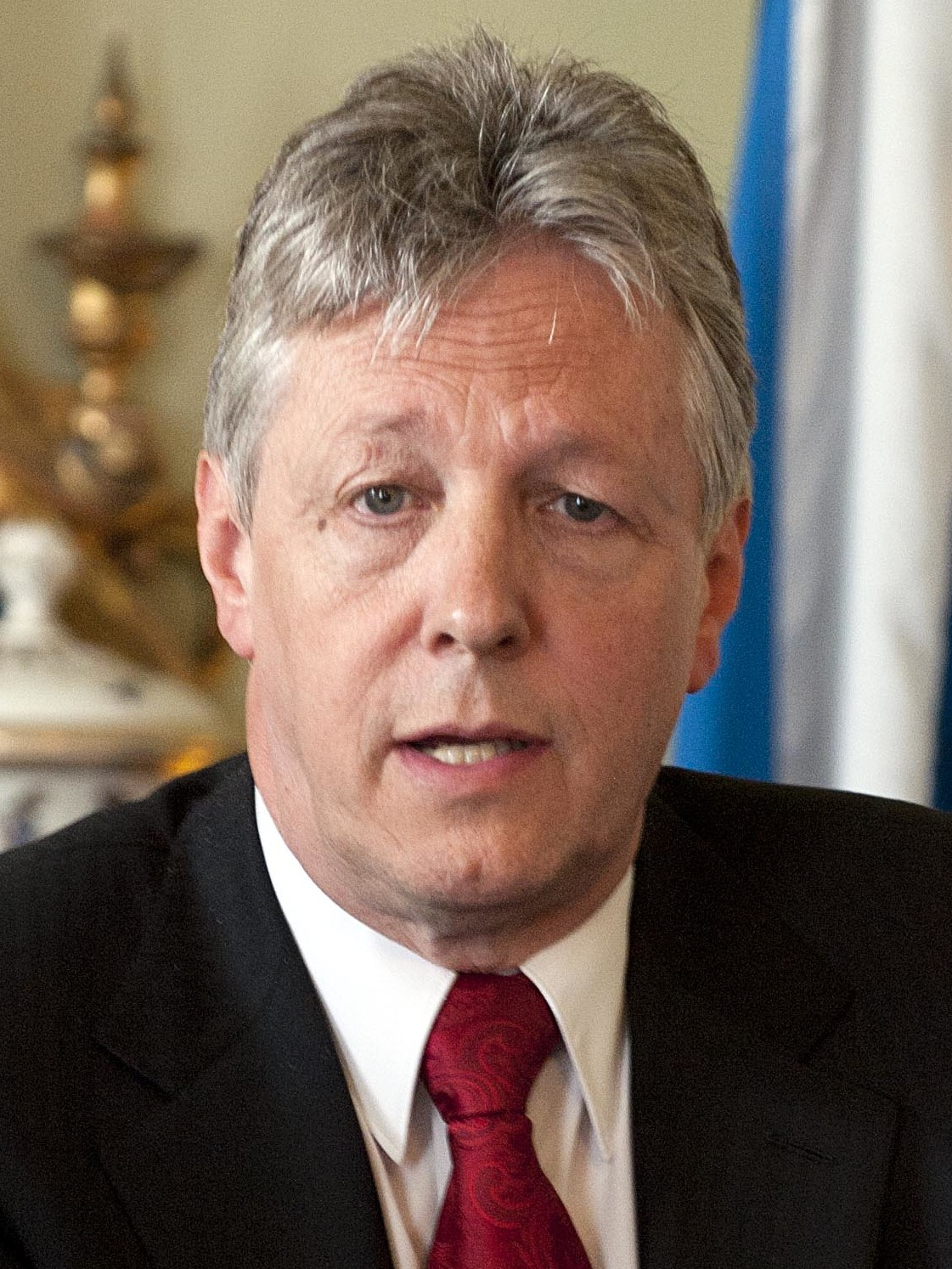
- Robinson in 2011

First Minister of Northern Ireland
- In office 5 June 2008 – 11 January 2016^{[a]} Serving with Martin McGuinness
- Preceded by: Ian Paisley
- Succeeded by: Arlene Foster

Leader of the Democratic Unionist Party
- In office 31 May 2008 – 17 December 2015
- Deputy: Nigel Dodds
- Preceded by: Ian Paisley
- Succeeded by: Arlene Foster

Leader of the Democratic Unionist Party in the House of Commons
- In office 31 May 2008 – 6 May 2010
- Preceded by: Ian Paisley
- Succeeded by: Nigel Dodds

Deputy Leader of the Democratic Unionist Party
- In office 31 May 1980 – 31 May 2008
- Leader: Ian Paisley
- Preceded by: William Beattie
- Succeeded by: Nigel Dodds

Minister of Finance and Personnel
- In office 8 May 2007 – 5 June 2008
- First Minister: Ian Paisley
- Preceded by: Sean Farren
- Succeeded by: Nigel Dodds

Minister for Regional Development
- In office 24 October 2001 – 11 October 2002
- First Minister: David Trimble
- Preceded by: Gregory Campbell
- Succeeded by: Conor Murphy
- In office 29 November 1999 – 27 July 2000
- First Minister: David Trimble
- Preceded by: Office established
- Succeeded by: Gregory Campbell

Member of the Legislative Assembly for Belfast East
- In office 25 June 1998 – 7 May 2016
- Preceded by: Constituency established
- Succeeded by: Joanne Bunting
- In office 20 October 1982 – 1986
- Preceded by: Assembly re-established
- Succeeded by: Assembly abolished

Member of Parliament for Belfast East
- In office 3 May 1979 – 12 April 2010
- Preceded by: William Craig
- Succeeded by: Naomi Long

Member of Castlereagh Borough Council
- In office 15 May 1985 – 2 January 2007
- Preceded by: District created
- Succeeded by: Carole Howard
- Constituency: Castlereagh Central
- In office 18 May 1977 – 15 May 1985
- Preceded by: C.R. Beacon
- Succeeded by: District abolished
- Constituency: Castlereagh Area C

Northern Ireland Forum Member for Belfast East
- In office 30 May 1996 – 25 April 1998
- Preceded by: Forum created
- Succeeded by: Forum dissolved

Personal details
- Born: Peter David Robinson; 29 December 1948 (age 77) Belfast, Northern Ireland
- Party: Democratic Unionist Party
- Spouse: Iris Collins (m. 1970)
- Children: 3
- Education: Castlereagh College
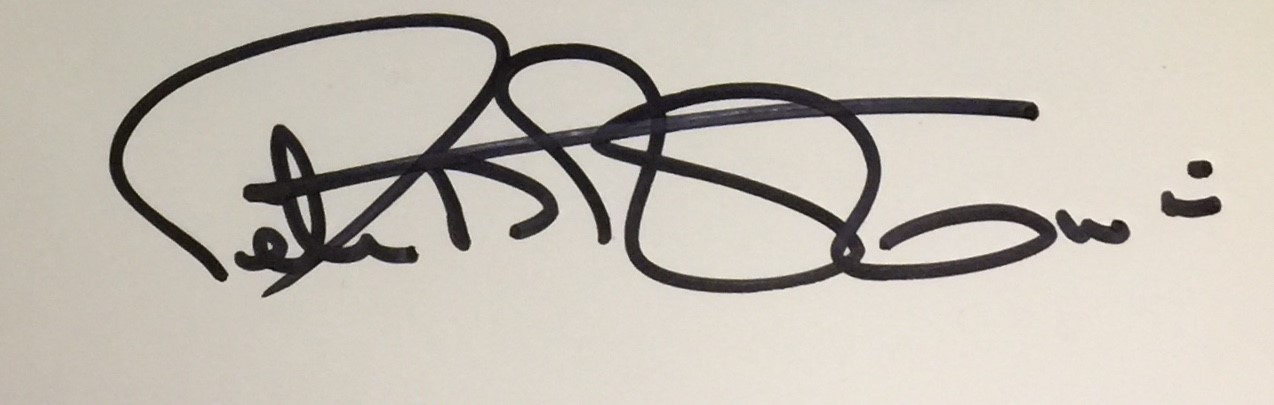
- Signature
- Website: Peter Robinson
- ^aArlene Foster served as Acting FM from 11 January 2010 to 3 February 2010 and 10 September 2015 to 20 October 2015. Robinson served alongside John O'Dowd in his capacity as Acting dFM from 20 September 2011 to 31 October 2011.

Peter David Robinson (born 29 December 1948) is a retired Northern Irish politician who served as First Minister of Northern Ireland from 2008 until 2016 and Leader of the Democratic Unionist Party (DUP) from 2008 until 2015. Until his retirement in 2016, Robinson was involved in Northern Irish politics for over 40 years, being a founding member of the DUP along with Ian Paisley.

Robinson served in the role of General Secretary of the DUP from 1975, a position which he held until 1979 and which afforded him the opportunity to exert extraordinary influence within the fledgeling party. In 1977, Robinson was elected as a councillor for the Castlereagh Borough Council, and in 1979, he became one of the youngest Members of Parliament (MP) when he was narrowly elected for Belfast East. He held this seat for 31 years until his defeat by Naomi Long in 2010, making him the longest-serving Belfast MP since the 1800 Act of Union.

In 1980, Robinson was elected as the deputy leader of the DUP. Following the re-establishment of devolved government in Northern Ireland as a result of the Good Friday Agreement, Robinson was elected in 1998 as the Member of the Legislative Assembly (MLA) for Belfast East. Robinson subsequently served as Minister for Regional Development and Minister of Finance and Personnel in the Northern Ireland Executive. Robinson was elected unopposed to succeed Ian Paisley as leader of the DUP on 15 April 2008, and was subsequently confirmed as First Minister of Northern Ireland on 5 June 2008.

In January 2010, following a scandal involving his wife Iris, Robinson temporarily handed over his duties as First Minister to Arlene Foster under the terms of the Northern Ireland Act 2006. Following a police investigation, which recommended that Robinson should not be prosecuted following allegations made by the BBC in relation to the scandal, he resumed his duties as First Minister. The Official Assembly Commissioner's Investigation and Report cleared Robinson of any wrongdoing.

In September 2015, Robinson again stood aside to allow Arlene Foster to become acting First Minister after his bid to adjourn the assembly was rejected. His action was a response to a murder for which a member of Sinn Féin, a party in the Northern Ireland Executive, had been questioned. He resumed his duties on 20 October 2015. On 19 November 2015, he announced that he would be stepping down as First Minister and as leader of the DUP. Robinson subsequently stepped down as First Minister on 11 January 2016 and has now fully retired from frontline politics. He is currently the longest-serving Northern Irish First Minister since the Good Friday Agreement of 1998.

== Background ==
Peter David Robinson was born on 29 December 1948 in Belfast, Northern Ireland, the son of Sheila and David McCrea Robinson.

Robinson was educated at Annadale Grammar School and Castlereagh College, now part of the Belfast Metropolitan College. In 1966 Robinson first heard Ian Paisley speak at a rally at Ulster Hall and shortly afterwards left school to devote himself to the Protestant fundamentalist cause. Robinson considered joining the Royal Ulster Constabulary but instead he joined the Lagan Valley unit of the Ulster Protestant Volunteers (UPV), a paramilitary organisation tied to Ian Paisley's Free Presbyterian Church. Robinson also joined the Ulster Constitution Defence Committee. As a young man Robinson embraced a populist anti-Catholic fundamentalism; a former classmate alleged Robinson and a friend harassed a pair of Catholic nuns in the street in Portrush, County Antrim, yelling "Popehead, Popehead". Robinson initially gained employment as an estate agent for R.J. McConnell & Co and later with Alex, Murdoch & Deane in Belfast, and then he became the DUP's first general secretary in 1975.

== Political career ==
=== Member of the DUP ===
Robinson had by 1970 come to Paisley's notice after writing a pamphlet called The North Answers Back which attacked the Northern Ireland civil rights movement and defended the Stormont government. Robinson became chairman of the Lagan Valley branch of the DUP's predecessor the Protestant Unionist Party upon its formation. In 1970 he was prominent in Paisley's campaign to win the North Antrim seat in the 1970 UK general election Robinson and for a time served as Paisley's private secretary. In 1971 Robinson was a founding member of the DUP and was General Secretary of the DUP between 1975 and 1979. He had previously shared the post of honorary secretary of the party on an unpaid basis with Desmond Boal. Robinson was active in the 1974 Ulster Workers' Council strike against the Sunningdale Agreement, which had been signed in December 1973. A senior loyalist politician recalled walking into the Ulster Workers' Council HQ on Hawthornden Road to find Peter Robinson and Jim Allister "giggling", phoning SDLP headquarters claiming to be Catholics in distress in a loyalist area afflicted by the strike and asking the SDLP to send a car to rescue them. He was campaign manager for East Belfast MP William Craig in the 1974 general election but the relationship was short-lived. He first stood in the election to the Northern Ireland Constitutional Convention on 1 May 1975 in Belfast, East. Although he started in fifth place, he failed to get elected and was overtaken by his running mate Eileen Paisley.

Robinson was elected as a councillor for Castlereagh Borough Council for the Castlereagh C area in the local government elections on 18 May 1977, a seat he held until his resignation from the council on 2 July 2007.

=== Member of Parliament and Executive Minister ===
Robinson was selected as DUP candidate for Belfast East during the 1979 general election, a seat which previously had a big Ulster Unionist Party (UUP) majority. He won the seat with a 19.9% swing to the DUP and a majority of 64, with Alliance Party leader Oliver Napier 928 votes behind, unseating the MP former Vanguard Progressive Unionist Party leader and UUP candidate William Craig on 3 May 1979. The main plank of Robinson's campaign was that he was the only candidate in the constituency who totally opposed power-sharing with the SDLP.

He was re-elected to the House of Commons in 1983, 1986 (along with other unionist MPs, he resigned his seat in protest at the Anglo-Irish Agreement on 17 December 1985 and was re-elected in the by-election the next year), 1987, 1992, 2001 and 2005. In the 2010 UK general election he lost Belfast East to Naomi Long of the Alliance Party.

Robinson served on the Northern Ireland Affairs Committee from 1997 to July 2005.

In the general election on 7 June 2001, Robinson's wife, Iris, joined him in Parliament as MP for Strangford.

=== Leadership of the Democratic Unionist Party ===
Robinson's electoral success was marked when he was elected Deputy Leader of the DUP in 1980. He was elected to the Northern Ireland Assembly for Belfast East on 20 October 1982 where he served as Chairman of the Environment Committee until it was dissolved in 1986.

In 1986 he was involved, alongside other DUP leaders, in the launch of Ulster Resistance at the Ulster Hall, an event chaired by the DUP. Robinson was later photographed wearing a beret at an Ulster Resistance rally. The DUP later severed links with Ulster Resistance in 1987.

Robinson resigned briefly as DUP Deputy Leader in 1987 when the Task Force Report, written jointly with UUP members Harold McCusker MP and Frank Millar and calling for a strategic unionist rethink in the wake of the Anglo-Irish Agreement was rejected by their respective leaders, Ian Paisley and James Molyneaux.

He was elected to the Northern Ireland Forum on 30 May 1996 and served in it until it completed its work in 1998. On 25 June 1998, he was elected MLA for Belfast East in the Northern Ireland Assembly election. He was subsequently re-elected to the Northern Ireland Assembly in 2003 and again in 2007.

Robinson was Minister for Regional Development, which has overall responsibility for the Department for Regional Development (DRD), between 29 November 1999 to 27 July 2000 and 24 October 2001 to 11 October 2002. He was responsible for the introduction of free fares on public transport for the elderly and helped formulate the 25-year Regional Development Strategy for Northern Ireland and devise the 10-year Regional Transport Strategy.

Robinson was Minister of Finance and Personnel from 8 May 2007 to June 2008.

On 4 March 2008, Ian Paisley announced that he would step down as Leader of the DUP and First Minister that May. On 14 April 2008, Robinson was nominated unanimously by the DUP MLAs as leader-designate with Nigel Dodds as deputy leader-designate and on 17 April 2008 they were both ratified by the DUP's 120-member executive committee. He formally became leader on 31 May 2008.

=== First Minister of Northern Ireland ===
As he was nominated by the largest party, Robinson was ratified by the Northern Ireland Assembly as First Minister with Sinn Féin's Martin McGuinness as deputy First Minister on 5 June 2008.

On 11 January 2010 Robinson announced that he was temporarily stepping down from the position of First Minister to clear his name over BBC allegations arising from the Iris Robinson scandal. Arlene Foster was designated to discharge the duties of First Minister until his return. Robinson faced claims that he knew his wife had obtained £50,000 from two developers for her teenage lover but did not tell the proper authorities, leading to him asking the House of Commons and the Northern Ireland Assembly to carry out an inquiry into his conduct. After an OFMdFM lawyer advised Robinson that he had committed no wrongdoing, he returned to active duty as First Minister despite the ongoing investigations by the Police Service of Northern Ireland and the Assembly Commissioner for Standards and Privileges. While the police investigation into the conduct of the Peter and Iris Robinson concluded in a recommendation not to prosecute in 2011, the Standards and Privileges enquiry remained incomplete three years after it was ordered by the Assembly. It was delayed as Iris Robinson was adjudged medically unfit to respond to the enquiry. The report was finally completed at the beginning of 2014, and finally made publicly available on 28 November 2014. Section 13 of the report stated that the three BBC allegations against Robinson "even if established after investigation", did not breach of the Code of Conduct.

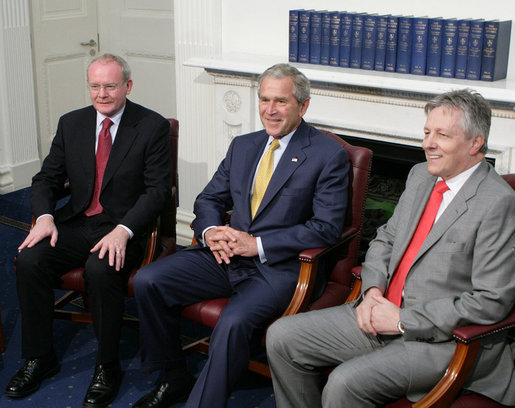
Robinson with George W. Bush (centre) and Martin McGuinness (left)

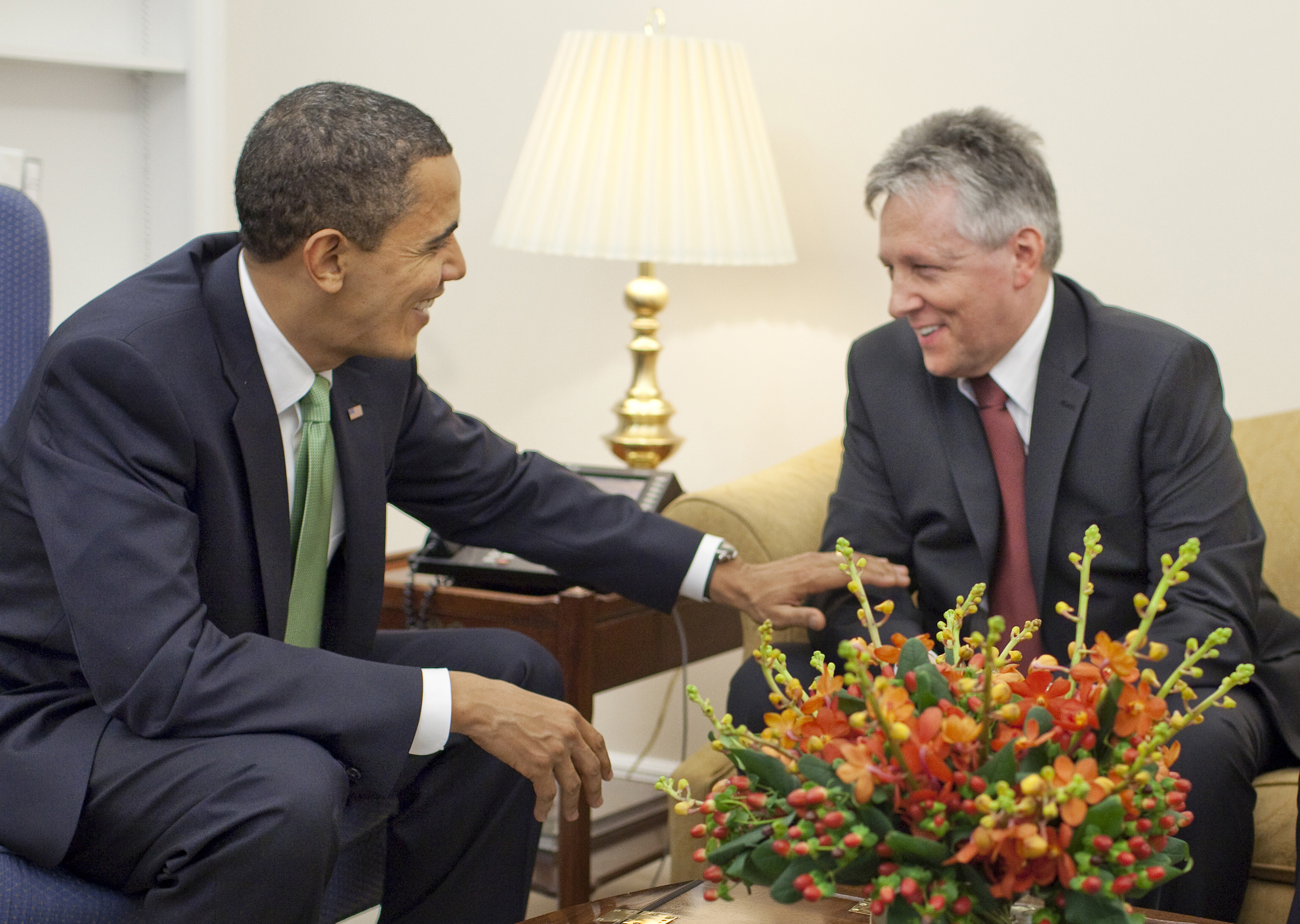
Robinson meets with United States President Barack Obama at the White House on St. Patrick's Day 2009.

On 5 February 2010, Robinson and McGuinness oversaw the devolution of policing and justice powers from the British Parliament to the Northern Ireland Assembly, negotiating a power-sharing deal with Sinn Féin. This process ensured that devolution in Northern Ireland was able to be fully completed. At the 2011 Assembly election, both the DUP and Sinn Féin increased their number of seats. Robinson had led the DUP to its best ever Assembly election result. Robinson and McGuinness were sworn in for a second term as First Minister and Deputy First Minister respectively shortly afterwards.

On 6 April 2011 Robinson attended the funeral of murdered PSNI officer, Ronan Kerr, becoming the first DUP leader to attend a Catholic Mass.

In 2012, Robinson was involved in the historic visit of Queen Elizabeth II to Northern Ireland, when she shook hands with Martin McGuinness. Robinson supported the event, saying, "We recognise that this will be a difficult ask for Her Majesty The Queen and a significant step for republicans. The process has required us all to reach out and take decisions outside our comfort zone. It is the right decision and a step forward for Northern Ireland."

On 19 November 2015, Robinson announced he would be stepping down as Northern Ireland First Minister and leader of the DUP. Although he had recently suffered a heart attack, he stated his health was not the main reason behind his decision to stand down. He did not contest the 2016 Northern Ireland Assembly election.

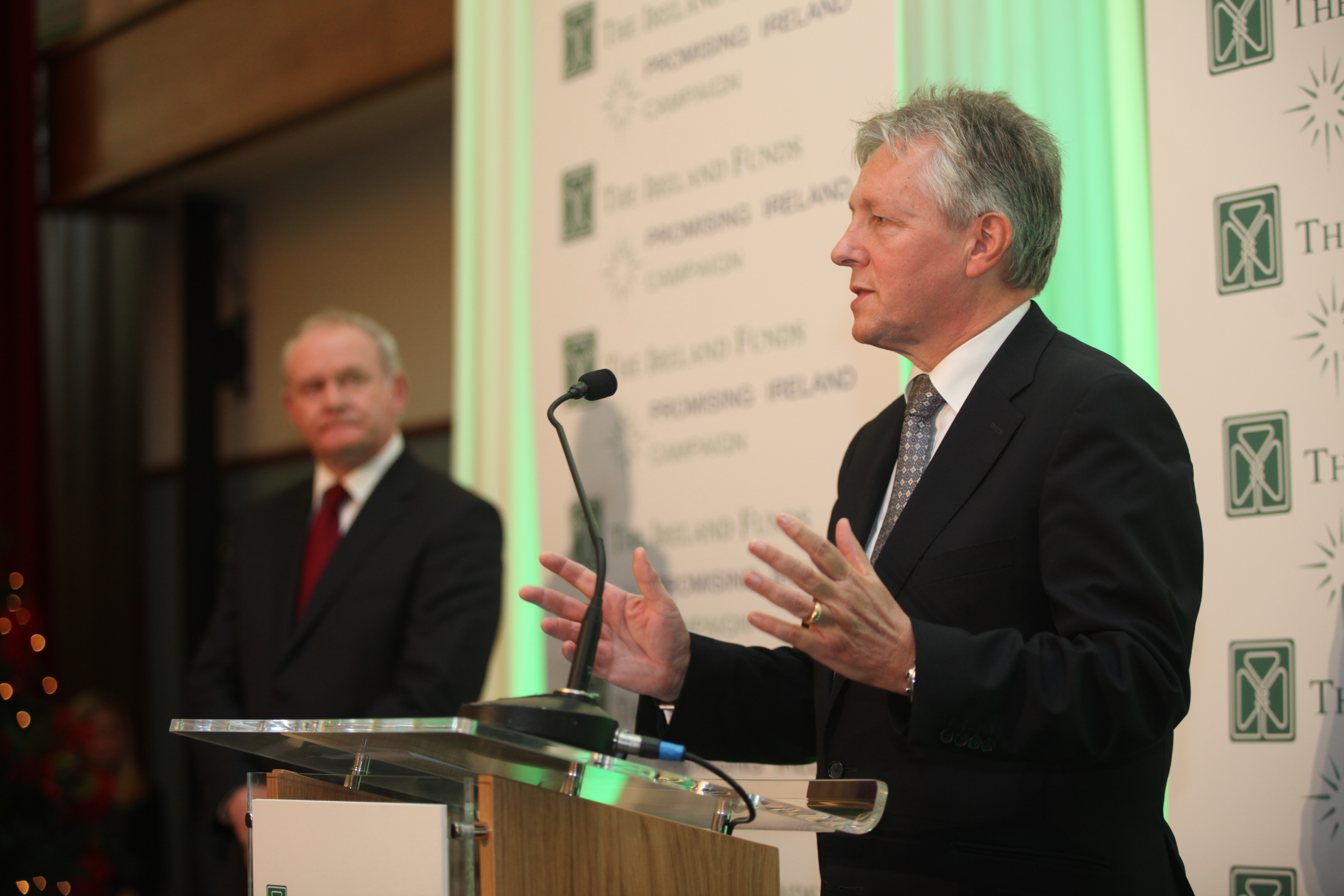
Robinson speaking at Titanic Belfast as Martin McGuinness looks on, 2012

== Political and personal controversies ==
=== Ulster Defence Association links ===
The Ulster Defence Association (UDA), a Loyalist paramilitary group, were a decisive factor in Robinson being elected to the Belfast East constituency during the 1979 general election. Robinson had an association with the UDA that predated the 1979 election by several years. UDA members canvassed for Robinson's election campaign, displayed his posters at their headquarters and did "sterling service" at polling booths. In 1984 Robinson and UUP politician John Carson negotiated on behalf of loyalist paramilitary prisoners held at Magilligan Prison on hunger strike in protest at not being segregated from republican prisoners. The pair and Ian Paisley both spoke at a large rally on the Shankill Road in support of the loyalists on hunger strike; Paisley addressing the British government, said "We as the Protestant people of Ulster... say you have a right to give our prisoners safety". Robinson, in support, read out a letter from loyalist paramilitary prisoners: "...often it is the sacrifice of a few that improves the life and standards for many, we are, if necessary, ready to make that sacrifice." Later interviewed about his role in the loyalist hunger strike, asked if he regarded the UDA as terrorists, he insisted that they were "counter-terrorists" and refused to condemn the UDA and Ulster Volunteer Force (UVF) by name.

Following the signing of the 1985 Anglo-Irish Agreement Robinson tried to enlist the paramilitary group to join demonstrations including taking over towns at night. UDA sources claimed UDA members met Robinson at DUP headquarters, who would instruct his police bodyguard to sit outside the room and wait. Robinson also made contact with the UVF to coordinate strike action against the Anglo-Irish Agreement; following criticism Robinson insisted he was only fulfilling his responsibilities as Belfast co-ordinator for the protests. In this period Robinson attended rallies in Keady and Portadown where masked men paraded in military formation. In a profile by World in Action in 1986 Robinson acknowledged that he was relying on the UDA for "muscle" in the unionist confrontation with the British government over the Agreement, but justified the strategy on the basis that Prime Minister Margaret Thatcher had ignored the elected representatives of unionism and "other means" were necessary.

Robinson and UUP MP Harold McCusker were pallbearers at the funeral of UDA commander John McMichael, who was assassinated at his home by the IRA in December 1987. He also was a pallbearer with DUP politician Sammy Wilson at the funeral of UDA leader Ray Smallwoods, who served half of a 15-year sentence for the attempted murder of Bernadette McAliskey in 1981.

=== Invasion of Clontibret ===
On 7 August 1986, in protest at the Anglo-Irish Agreement, Robinson led a group of loyalists into the village of Clontibret in County Monaghan in the Republic of Ireland to demonstrate the lack of security along the Irish border. The loyalists attacked the unmanned Garda station in the village and daubed loyalist slogans on the walls. They then held a parade along the main street and attacked two Gardaí. More Gardaí arrived shortly after and fired shots in the air, scattering the loyalist crowd. Robinson was arrested and held at Monaghan Garda station. He pleaded guilty to unlawful assembly and was fined IR£17,500 in a Drogheda court. There was also violence both before and after a court appearance in Dundalk, when both Robinson and Ian Paisley were attacked. Republicans also threw stones and petrol bombs at flag-waving Robinson supporters. At his trial one of the judges described him as "a senior extremist politician".

=== Ulster Resistance ===
In November 1986, Paisley and Robinson spoke at the Ulster Hall demonstration which launched Ulster Resistance (UR), the organisation was intended to act as a protector for beleaguered unionists who were under attack from the IRA. The organisation subsequently imported arms from South Africa, resulting in Paisley and Robinson dissociating themselves from the organisation. He was photographed wearing the group's beret at an Ulster Resistance demonstration.

=== Views on homosexuality ===
In the late 1970s, Robinson became widely known as the organiser of the DUP's Save Ulster from Sodomy campaign to prevent the decriminalisation of homosexuality in Northern Ireland.

On 30 October 2008, in his first extensive interview as First Minister (for Hearts and Minds on BBC Northern Ireland), Peter Robinson stated that homosexuality was against Christian theology.

Robinson's wife, Iris, had quoted the Bible which said that homosexuality was an abomination and that with help, gay people could be "turned around". A police investigation was initiated amid claims "her comments breached hate crime laws. No charges were brought." Peter Robinson supported his wife's statements, saying: "It wasn't Iris Robinson who determined that homosexuality was an abomination, it was The Almighty. This is the Scriptures. It is a strange world indeed where somebody on the one hand talks about equality, but won't allow Christians to have the equality, the right to speak, the right to express their views."

=== Planning application ===
On 28 May 2009 the Planning Service of Northern Ireland granted a developer planning permission for six houses to be built on land, part of which, was Robinson's rear garden on the Gransha Road in the Dundonald area of East Belfast.

On 30 March 2010, the BBC reported that Robinson had purchased a piece of land from a developer for £5, enabling him to sell part of his back garden for nearly £460,000. Robinson later claimed that the inaccurate report was evidence that the BBC were leading a smear campaign against him.

=== BBC Spotlight investigation ===
On 8 January 2010 the BBC Northern Ireland programme Spotlight reported on how his wife, Iris, had obtained £50,000 for Kirk McCambley, 19 at the time, while in a sexual relationship with him. On the day before the Spotlight programme, Peter Robinson had made an emotional statement to the Press Association, BBC, UTV and RTÉ in regard to the relationship and stated that there had been no financial wrongdoing. The programme maintained that when Robinson found out about the financial aspects of his wife's relationship he insisted that the money she had lobbied two property developers for and which she subsequently lent and gave to her lover be returned in full. It claimed that he did not tell the proper authorities what he knew about the transactions between the four, despite being obliged by the Northern Ireland Executive ministerial code of conduct to act in the public interest at all times. Later that day Robinson's solicitors said he was thoroughly satisfied that he had at all times acted properly and fulfilled all requirements, and would robustly challenge any allegation to the contrary. On the following day, Robinson maintained that he had "learned from Spotlight for the first time some alleged aspects of my wife's affair and her financial arrangements" and that he would be "resolutely defending attacks on my character and contesting any allegations of wrongdoing". A series of investigations cleared Robinson.

=== FAIR censorship allegations ===
According to a report on the website of the Families Acting for Innocent Relatives (FAIR) non-governmental organisation, in 2007 Peter Robinson wrote to its director Willie Frazer, telling him he "might find it much easier to get co-operation with political representatives if you were genuinely involved in Victim Support rather than opposition politics". Robinson's principal private secretary was found to have been involved, in February 2010, in trying to have criticism of the DUP's working relationship with Sinn Féin censored from FAIR's website. UUP leader Reg Empey asked whether this amounted to party political use of the office. Seven months later FAIR's funding by the Special EU Programmes Body (SEUPB) was stopped following allegations of financial irregularities in the group. Frazer stepped down as director after reading the report.

=== Pastor McConnell support and Islam ===
In May 2014, Robinson was widely criticized after he told The Irish News that he supported Whitewell Metropolitan Tabernacle Pastor James McConnell's right as a pastor to make remarks about Islam. In a sermon the pastor had stated "Islam is heathen, Islam is satanic, Islam is a doctrine spawned in hell." Robinson said that like the pastor he would not "trust them" for spiritual guidance, speaking of Muslims who follow a strict interpretation of Sharia law. Pastor McConnell was found not guilty of two charges related to his sermon in 2016 - improper use of a public electronic communications network and causing a grossly offensive message to be sent by means of a public electronic communications network.

On 30 May, leaders of Northern Ireland's Muslim community met with Robinson at Stormont Castle and accepted his clarification of the situation. He also accepted an invitation to the Belfast Islamic Centre. After meeting members of the Islamic community he said he would be visiting the Centre again, a place where he felt welcome and respected.

== Personal life ==
Robinson married Iris Collins on 26 July 1970; they have three children, Jonathan, Gareth and Rebekah.

His wife has joined him as a councillor, an MLA and an MP. Their son, Gareth Robinson was also member of Castlereagh (borough). They were the first husband and wife ever to represent Northern Ireland constituencies in Parliament. His daughter, Rebekah, served as his private secretary for his Advice Centre in the East Belfast constituency.

He is a supporter of Rangers and Tottenham Hotspur and has expressed admiration for former Spurs player Gareth Bale. Robinson is also a fan of his local Belfast football team Glentoran.

Robinson is an evangelical Pentecostal Christian. Despite originally attending Ian Paisley's Free Presbyterian Church of Ulster, he left in the late 1970s and joined Elim Pentecostal Church and then the Assemblies of God. Robinson was the driving force behind the DUPs secular appeal and leaving the FPCU was perhaps a part of this strategy.

He lives in Dundonald, County Down. In 2014 he and his wife sold their luxury villa in Florida and their apartment in the London Docklands.

He is author of a number of books and pamphlets on local politics and history including: The Union Under Fire (1995); Sinn Féin – A Case for Proscription (1993); Hands off the UDR (1990); Their Cry was no Surrender (1986); Ulster in Peril (1984); Carson – Man of Action (1984); It's Londonderry (1984); A War to be Won (1983); Self-Inflicted (1981); Ulster the Facts (1981); Savagery and Suffering (1975); Capital Punishment for Capital Crime (1974); Give Me Liberty (no date); Ulster—the Prey (no date).

On 25 May 2015, he suffered a suspected heart attack and was admitted to hospital.

== Satire ==
Robinson's character on the BBC's Folks on the Hill television programme is portrayed as aggressive and constantly trying to get away from the Ian Paisley-Martin McGuinness so-called "Chuckle Brothers" image when he works with Martin McGuinness.

== See also ==
- Office of the First Minister and deputy First Minister
- List of Northern Ireland members of the Privy Council

Party political offices
New political party	General Secretary of the Democratic Unionist Party; 1975–1979	Succeeded by William Beattie
Preceded by William Beattie	Deputy Leader of the Democratic Unionist Party; 1980–2008	Succeeded by Nigel Dodds
Preceded by Ian Paisley	Leader of the Democratic Unionist Party; 2008–2015	Succeeded by Arlene Foster
Parliament of the United Kingdom
Preceded by William Craig	Member of Parliament for Belfast East; 1979–2010	Succeeded by Naomi Long
Northern Ireland Assembly (1982)
New assembly	Member of the Parliamentary Assembly for East Belfast; 1982–1986	Assembly abolished
Northern Ireland Forum
New forum	Member of the Northern Ireland Forum for East Belfast; 1996–1998	Forum abolished
Northern Ireland Assembly
New assembly	Member of the Legislative Assembly for East Belfast; 1998–2016	Succeeded by Joanne Bunting
Political offices
New office	Minister for Regional Development; 1999–2000	Succeeded by Gregory Campbell
Preceded by Gregory Campbell	Minister for Regional Development; 2001–2002	Vacant Office suspended Title next held by Conor Murphy
Vacant Office suspended Title last held by Sean Farren	Minister of Finance and Personnel; 2007–2008	Succeeded by Nigel Dodds
Preceded by Ian Paisley	First Minister of Northern Ireland; 2008–2016	Succeeded by Arlene Foster
