= Belfast East (UK Parliament constituency) =

Parliamentary constituency in the United Kingdom, 1885–1918 and since 1922

- Borough constituency for the House of Commons
- Boundary of Belfast East in Northern Ireland
- District: Belfast; Lisburn and Castlereagh
- Population: 92,221 (2011 census)
- Electorate: 60,516 (March 2011)
- Borough: Belfast

Current constituency
- Created: 1922
- Member of Parliament: Gavin Robinson (DUP)
- Seats: 1
- Created from: Belfast Pottinger; Belfast Victoria

1885–1918
- Seats: 1
- Type of constituency: Borough constituency
- Created from: Belfast
- Replaced by: Belfast Pottinger; Belfast Victoria

Map of current boundaries

Belfast East is a parliamentary constituency in the United Kingdom House of Commons. The MP since 2015 is Gavin Robinson of the Democratic Unionist Party (DUP). Since the 2024 general election, the seat is centred on the east section of Belfast and also contains part of the district of Lisburn and Castlereagh.

== History ==
Belfast East is an overwhelmingly unionist constituency with nationalist parties routinely failing to get more than 10% of the vote combined. The main interest has been the contest between unionist parties and the fortunes of the Alliance Party of Northern Ireland.

Dominated by the giant Samson and Goliath cranes of the Harland and Wolff shipyard, the constituency is socially mixed. There are large expanses of small Victorian terraced housing near Belfast City Centre and around the shipyard in Ballymacarrett. These areas have seen significant refurbishment, and in some places demolition and redevelopment, in recent years sparking a sharp rise in house prices. This is contrasted by a large amount of solidly lower-middle class housing and some exclusive residential districts such as the much mocked Cherryvalley. This social polarisation is to a large degree reflected by the political polarisation, at least within the broader unionist family, in the seat. The small Catholic population is split between the largely working class Short Strand enclave and minorities in the more middle-class parts of the seat.

The seat was consistently held by the Ulster Unionist Party until the 1974 general election when the sitting MP, Stanley McMaster, defended it as a Pro-Assembly Unionist against a united anti-Sunningdale Agreement coalition which nominated William Craig of the Vanguard Progressive Unionist Party. Craig won the seat and held it for five years, moving to the UUP in February 1978.

In the 1979 general election the constituency witnessed a very close three-way fight between Peter Robinson of the Democratic Unionist Party, William Craig for the UUP and Oliver Napier for the Alliance Party of Northern Ireland. Less than 1000 votes separated the three candidates. Robinson beat Craig by the narrow margin of 64 votes. Also of note was that over 90% of votes went to parties that had not contested the seat at the previous election – in part due to realignments of the parties.

Robinson continued to hold the seat but the Alliance Party continued to poll well, and in 1987 John Alderdice polled 32.1% – the highest ever for Alliance in a Westminster election before 2010. However, their vote declined until 2010 and in 2005 they finished a distant third.

In the 2001 general election, Alliance proposed a pro-Good Friday Agreement pact with the Ulster Unionist Party in the hopes of getting UUP support in Belfast East. The UUP did not agree and so both parties stood. Robinson was re-elected with 42.5%, with the UUP, Alliance and Progressive Unionist Party carving up the pro-Agreement pro-union vote between them.

In 2009 and 2010, Robinson became mired in a number of political scandals. In the 2010 general election, the Alliance Party candidate and sitting Lord Mayor of Belfast Naomi Long defeated Robinson, more than tripling the Alliance vote and giving the Alliance their first seat in Westminster since 1974. Predictably, this was also the seat in which the Alliance gained the highest vote share, at 37.2%, more than double their best efforts elsewhere.

Of the 18 seats in the region, East Belfast has the highest percentage of Methodists. The 2019 winning vote share was the fourth-largest of the region, but just short of an absolute majority.

== Boundaries ==
Under the Redistribution of Seats Act 1885, the parliamentary borough of Belfast was expanded. The 2-seat borough constituency of Belfast was divided into four divisions: Belfast East, Belfast North, Belfast South and Belfast West. The city boundaries were expanded again under the Belfast Corporation Act 1896. This was reflected in the Redistribution of Seats (Ireland) Act 1918, with the expanded parliamentary borough divided into 9 divisions. The Pottinger and Victoria divisions largely replaced the Belfast East division.

The Government of Ireland Act 1920 established the Parliament of Northern Ireland, which came into operation in 1921. The representation of Northern Ireland in the Parliament of the United Kingdom was reduced from 30 to 13, taking effect at the 1922 United Kingdom general election. These changes saw a 4-seat Belfast East constituency in the House of Commons of Northern Ireland and Belfast East re-established as a one-seat constituency at Westminster.

1885–1918	In the parliamentary borough of Belfast, Dock ward (except the part in Belfast North); the part of Cromac ward in County Down; the townlands of Ballycloghan, Ballyhackamore, Ballymaghan, Ballymisert and Strandtown in the parish of Holywood; and the townlands of Ballyrushboy, Knock and Multyhogy in the parish of Knockbreda.
1922–1950	The Pottinger (Pottinger ward) and Victoria (Dock and Victoria wards) divisions
1950–1974	In the county borough of Belfast, the wards of Mountpottinger, Dock and Victoria
1974–1983	In the county borough of Belfast, the wards of Pottinger and Victoria, and in the Rural District of Castlereagh, the district electoral divisions of Ballyhackamore, Ballymaconaghy, Ballymiscaw, Castlereagh, Dundonald, and Gilnakirk
1983–1997	The District of Belfast wards of Ballyhackamore, Ballymacarrett, Belmont, Bloomfield, Island, Orangefield, Shandon, Stormont, Sydenham, and The Mount, and the District of Castlereagh wards of Cregagh, Downshire, Lisnasharragh, and Wynchurch
1997–2010	The District of Belfast wards of Ballyhackamore, Ballymacarrett, Belmont, Bloomfield, Cherryvalley, Island, Knock, Orangefield, Stormont, Sydenham, and The Mount, and the District of Castlereagh wards of Cregagh, Downshire, Gilnahirk, Hillfoot, Lisnasharragh, Lower Braniel, Tullycarnet, Upper Braniel, and Wynchurch.
2010–2024	The District of Belfast wards of Ballyhackamore, Ballymacarrett, Belmont, Bloomfield, Cherryvalley, Island, Knock, Orangefield, Stormont, Sydenham, and The Mount, and the District of Castlereagh wards of Ballyhanwood, Carrowreagh, Cregagh, Downshire, Dundonald, Enler, Gilnakirk, Graham's Bridge, Lisnasharragh, Lower Braniel, Tullycarnet, and Upper Braniel.
2024–	The following wards of Belfast City Council— Ballymacarrett, Beersbridge, Belmont, Bloomfield, Connswater, Cregagh, Gilnahirk, Hillfoot, Knock, Merok, Orangefield, Sandown, Shandon, Stormont, Sydenham, Woodstock. The following wards of Lisburn and Castlereagh City Council— Ballyhanwood, Carrowreagh, Dundonald, Enler, Graham's Bridge.

== Members of Parliament ==
Election	Member	Party
1885	Edward de Cobain	Ind. Conservative
1886	Edward de Cobain	Irish Conservative
1892 by-election	Gustav Wilhelm Wolff	Irish Unionist
1910	R. J. McMordie	Irish Unionist
1914 by-election	Robert Sharman-Crawford	Irish Unionist
1918	Constituency abolished	
1922	Constituency recreated	
1922	Herbert Dixon	UUP
1940 by-election	Henry Harland	UUP
1945	Thomas Loftus Cole	UUP
1950	Alan McKibbin	UUP
1959 by-election	Stanley McMaster	UUP
February 1974	William Craig	Vanguard
1978	William Craig	UUP
1979	Peter Robinson	DUP
2010	Naomi Long	Alliance
2015	Gavin Robinson	DUP

== Elections ==
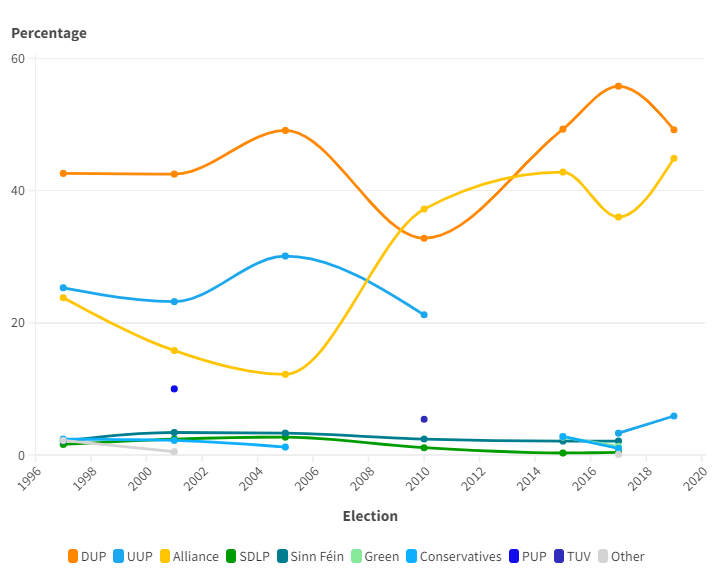

=== Elections in the 2020s ===
2024 general election: Belfast East
Party	Candidate	Votes	%	±%
DUP	Gavin Robinson	19,894	46.6	▼1.3
Alliance	Naomi Long	17,218	40.3	▼1.8
TUV	John Ross	1,918	4.5	new
UUP	Ryan Warren	1,818	4.3	▼1.4
Green (NI)	Brian Smyth	1,077	2.5	new
SDLP	Séamas de Faoite	619	1.4	▼2.9
Independent	Ryan North	162	0.4	new
Majority		2,676	6.2	▲0.4
Turnout		42,706	59.0	▼5.8
Registered electors		72,917		
DUP hold		Swing	▲0.2	

=== Elections in the 2010s ===
2019 notional result
Party	Vote	%
Democratic Unionist Party	21,616	47.9
Alliance	18,990	42.1
Ulster Unionist Party	2,581	5.7
Social Democratic and Labour Party	1,939	4.3
Majority	2,626	5.8
Turnout	45,126	64.4
Electorate	70,076	

2019 general election: Belfast East
Party	Candidate	Votes	%	±%
DUP	Gavin Robinson	20,874	49.2	–6.6
Alliance	Naomi Long	19,055	44.9	+8.9
UUP	Carl McClean	2,516	5.9	+2.6
Majority		1,819	4.3	–15.5
Turnout		42,445	64.1	–3.4
Registered electors		66,217		
DUP hold		Swing	–7.4	

2017 general election: Belfast East
Party	Candidate	Votes	%	±%
DUP	Gavin Robinson	23,917	55.8	+6.5
Alliance	Naomi Long	15,443	36.0	–6.8
UUP	Hazel Legge	1,408	3.3	New
Sinn Féin	Mairéad O'Donnell	894	2.1	0.0
Green (NI)	Georgina Milne	561	1.3	–1.4
NI Conservatives	Sheila Bodel	446	1.0	–1.8
SDLP	Séamas de Faoite	167	0.4	+0.1
Independent	Bobby Beck	54	0.1	New
Majority		8,474	19.8	+13.3
Turnout		42,890	67.5	+4.7
Registered electors		63,495		
DUP hold		Swing	+6.6	

2015 general election: Belfast East
Party	Candidate	Votes	%	±%
DUP	Gavin Robinson	19,575	49.3	+16.5
Alliance	Naomi Long	16,978	42.8	+5.6
NI Conservatives	Neil Wilson	1,121	2.8	–18.4
Green (NI)	Ross Brown	1,058	2.7	New
Sinn Féin	Niall Ó Donnghaile	823	2.1	–0.3
SDLP	Mary Muldoon	127	0.3	–0.8
Majority		2,597	6.5	N/A
Turnout		39,682	62.8	+4.4
Registered electors		63,157		
DUP gain from Alliance		Swing	+5.4	

2010 general election: Belfast East
Party	Candidate	Votes	%	±%
Alliance	Naomi Long	12,839	37.2	+25.0
DUP	Peter Robinson	11,306	32.8	–16.3
UCU-NF	Trevor Ringland	7,305	21.2	–8.9
TUV	David Vance	1,856	5.4	New
Sinn Féin	Niall Ó Donnghaile	817	2.4	–0.9
SDLP	Mary Muldoon	365	1.1	–1.6
Majority		1,533	4.4	N/A
Turnout		34,488	58.4	+0.4
Registered electors		59,007		
Alliance gain from DUP		Swing	–22.9	

=== Elections in the 2000s ===
2005 general election: Belfast East
Party	Candidate	Votes	%	±%
DUP	Peter Robinson	15,152	49.1	+6.6
UUP	Reg Empey	9,275	30.1	+6.9
Alliance	Naomi Long	3,746	12.2	–3.6
Sinn Féin	Deborah Devenny	1,029	3.3	–0.1
SDLP	Mary Muldoon	844	2.7	+0.3
NI Conservatives	Alan Greer	434	1.4	–0.8
Workers' Party	Joe Bell	179	0.6	+0.3
Rainbow Dream Ticket	Lynda Gilby	172	0.6	+0.4
Majority		5,877	19.0	–0.3
Turnout		30,831	58.0	–5.0
Registered electors		52,899		
DUP hold		Swing	–0.1	

2001 general election: Belfast East
Party	Candidate	Votes	%	±%
DUP	Peter Robinson	15,667	42.5	–0.1
UUP	Tim Lemon	8,550	23.2	–2.1
Alliance	David Alderdice	5,832	15.8	–8.0
PUP	David Ervine	3,669	10.0	New
Sinn Féin	Joe O'Donnell	1,237	3.4	+1.3
SDLP	Ciara Farren	880	2.4	+0.8
NI Conservatives	Terry Dick	800	2.2	–0.2
Workers' Party	Joe Bell	123	0.3	–0.3
Rainbow Dream Ticket	Rainbow George Weiss	71	0.2	New
Majority		7,117	19.3	+2.0
Turnout		36,829	63.0	–0.2
Registered electors		58,455		
DUP hold		Swing	+1.0	

=== Elections in the 1990s ===
1997 general election: Belfast East
Party	Candidate	Votes	%	±%
DUP	Peter Robinson	16,640	42.6	–11.9
UUP	Reg Empey	9,886	25.3	New
Alliance	Jim Hendron	9,288	23.8	–3.5
NI Conservatives	Sarah Dines	928	2.4	–7.6
Sinn Féin	Dominic Carr	810	2.1	+0.4
SDLP	Patricia Lewsley	629	1.6	New
Former Captain NI Football Team	Derek Dougan	541	1.4	New
Workers' Party	Joe Bell	237	0.6	–0.3
Natural Law	David Collins	70	0.2	–0.2
Majority		6,754	17.3	–9.9
Turnout		39,029	63.2	–4.5
Registered electors		61,837		
DUP hold		Swing		

1997 Changes are compared to the 1992 notional results shown below.

Notional 1992 UK general election result : Belfast East
Party	Candidate	Votes	%	±%
DUP	N/A	22,635	54.5	N/A
Alliance	N/A	11,337	27.3	N/A
NI Conservatives	N/A	4,170	10.0	N/A
Others	N/A	2,723	6.6	N/A
Sinn Féin	N/A	686	1.7	N/A
Majority		11,298	27.2	N/A

1992 general election: Belfast East
Party	Candidate	Votes	%	±%
DUP	Peter Robinson	18,437	51.5	–10.4
Alliance	John Alderdice	10,650	29.8	–2.3
NI Conservatives	David Greene	3,314	9.3	New
Ind. Unionist	Dorothy Dunlop	2,256	6.3	New
Sinn Féin	Joe O'Donnell	679	1.9	–0.1
Workers' Party	Joe Bell	327	0.9	–3.1
Natural Law	Guy Redden	128	0.4	New
Majority		7,787	21.7	–8.1
Turnout		35,791	67.7	+7.5
Registered electors		52,869		
DUP hold		Swing		

=== Elections in the 1980s ===
1987 general election: Belfast East
Party	Candidate	Votes	%	±%
DUP	Peter Robinson	20,372	61.9	+16.6
Alliance	John Alderdice	10,574	32.1	+8.0
Workers' Party	Frances Cullen	1,314	4.0	+2.9
Sinn Féin	Joe O'Donnell	649	2.0	+0.2
Majority		9,798	29.8	+9.3
Turnout		32,909	60.2	–9.8
Registered electors		54,628		
DUP hold		Swing		

By-election 1986: Belfast East
Party	Candidate	Votes	%	±%
DUP	Peter Robinson	27,607	81.0	+35.7
Alliance	Oliver Napier	5,917	17.4	–6.7
Workers' Party	Frances Cullen	578	1.7	+0.6
Majority		21,690	63.6	+43.1
Turnout		34,102	61.7	–8.3
Registered electors		55,256		
DUP hold		Swing		

Note: The by-election was caused by the decision of all Unionist MPs to resign their seats and seek re-election on a platform of opposition to the Anglo-Irish Agreement.

1983 general election: Belfast East
Party	Candidate	Votes	%	±%
DUP	Peter Robinson	17,631	45.3	+13.9
UUP	Jeremy Burchill	9,642	24.8	–6.4
Alliance	Oliver Napier	9,373	24.1	–5.5
Sinn Féin	Denis Donaldson	682	1.8	New
Labour and Trade Union	Muriel Tang	584	1.5	New
SDLP	Peter Prendiville	519	1.3	New
Workers' Party	Frances Cullen	421	1.1	New
New Agenda	Herbert Boyd	59	0.2	New
Majority		7,989	20.5	+20.3
Turnout		38,911	70.0	+2.4
Registered electors		55,539		
DUP hold		Swing		

=== Elections in the 1970s ===
1979 general election: Belfast East
Party	Candidate	Votes	%	±%
DUP	Peter Robinson	15,994	31.4	New
UUP	William Craig	15,930	31.2	New
Alliance	Oliver Napier	15,066	29.6	New
Unionist Party NI	Norman Agnew	2,017	4.0	–23.0
NI Labour	George Chambers	1,982	3.9	–10.0
Majority		64	0.2	N/A
Turnout		50,989	67.6	+0.5
Registered electors		75,481		
DUP gain from Vanguard		Swing		

October 1974 general election: Belfast East
Party	Candidate	Votes	%	±%
Vanguard	William Craig	31,594	59.1	+10.7
Unionist Party NI	Peter McLachlan	14,417	27.0	New
NI Labour	David Bleakley	7,415	13.9	–0.2
Majority		17,177	32.1	+18.6
Turnout		53,426	67.1	–4.8
Registered electors		79,591		
Vanguard hold		Swing		

February 1974 general election: Belfast East
Party	Candidate	Votes	%	±%
Vanguard	William Craig	27,817	48.4	New
Pro-Assembly Unionist	Stanley McMaster	20,077	34.9	New
NI Labour	David Bleakley	8,122	14.1	–26.4
SDLP	Desmond Gillespie	1,502	2.6	New
Majority		7,740	13.5	N/A
Turnout		57,518	71.9	–3.7
Registered electors		80,032		
Vanguard gain from UUP		Swing		

1970 general election: Belfast East
Party	Candidate	Votes	%	±%
UUP	Stanley McMaster	26,778	59.5	+4.8
NI Labour	David Bleakley	18,259	40.5	–4.8
Majority		8,519	19.0	+9.6
Turnout		45,037	75.6	+7.4
Registered electors		59,524		
UUP hold		Swing		

=== Elections in the 1960s ===
1966 general election: Belfast East
Party	Candidate	Votes	%	±%
UUP	Stanley McMaster	21,283	54.7	–4.1
NI Labour	Robert McBirney	17,650	45.3	+8.4
Majority		3,633	9.4	–12.5
Turnout		38,933	68.2	–4.3
Registered electors		57,077		
UUP hold		Swing		

1964 general election: Belfast East
Party	Candidate	Votes	%	±%
UUP	Stanley McMaster	24,804	58.8	–1.3
NI Labour	Samuel Watt	15,555	36.9	−0.3
Ind. Republican	David McConnell	1,827	4.3	New
Majority		9,249	21.9	–1.0
Turnout		42,186	72.5	–18.2
Registered electors		58,196		
UUP hold		Swing		

=== Elections in the 1950s ===
1959 general election: Belfast East
Party	Candidate	Votes	%	±%
UUP	Stanley McMaster	26,510	60.1	–2.4
NI Labour	James Gardner	16,412	37.2	+7.0
Sinn Féin	Barney Boswell	1,204	2.7	–4.6
Majority		9,249	22.9	–9.4
Turnout		44,126	90.7	+20.3
Registered electors		48,663		
UUP hold		Swing		

1959 Belfast East by-election
Party	Candidate	Votes	%	±%
UUP	Stanley McMaster	19,524	57.8	–4.7
NI Labour	James Gardner	14,264	42.2	+12.0
Majority		5,260	15.6	–16.7
Turnout		33,788	57.9	–12.5
Registered electors		58,388		
UUP hold		Swing		

1955 general election: Belfast East
Party	Candidate	Votes	%	±%
UUP	Alan McKibbin	26,938	62.5	+0.8
NI Labour	Tom Boyd	13,041	30.2	–8.1
Sinn Féin	Liam Mulcahy	3,156	7.3	New
Majority		13,897	32.3	+8.9
Turnout		43,135	70.4	–4.1
Registered electors		61,258		
UUP hold		Swing		

1951 general election: Belfast East
Party	Candidate	Votes	%	±%
UUP	Alan McKibbin	28,881	61.7	–1.6
NI Labour	Tom Boyd	17,910	38.3	+1.6
Majority		10,971	23.4	–3.2
Turnout		46,791	74.5	–2.1
Registered electors		62,798		
UUP hold		Swing		

1950 general election: Belfast East
Party	Candidate	Votes	%	±%
UUP	Alan McKibbin	29,844	63.3	+6.9
NI Labour	Tom Boyd	17,338	36.7	–6.9
Majority		12,506	26.6	+13.8
Turnout		47,182	76.6	+13.4
Registered electors		61,561		
UUP hold		Swing		

=== Elections in the 1940s ===
1945 general election: Belfast East
Party	Candidate	Votes	%	±%
UUP	Thomas Loftus Cole	21,443	56.4	N/A
NI Labour	Tom Boyd	17,338	43.6	New
Majority		4,869	12.8	N/A
Turnout		38,017	63.2	N/A
Registered electors		60,175		
UUP hold		Swing	N/A	

1940 Belfast East by-election
Party	Candidate	Votes	%	±%
UUP	Henry Harland	Unopposed		
Registered electors				
UUP hold				

=== Elections in the 1930s ===
1935 general election: Belfast East
Party	Candidate	Votes	%	±%
UUP	Herbert Dixon	Unopposed		
Registered electors		59,101		
UUP hold				

1931 general election: Belfast East
Party	Candidate	Votes	%	±%
UUP	Herbert Dixon	28,431	75.1	0.0
NI Labour	John Campbell	9,410	24.9	New
Majority		19,021	50.2	0.0
Turnout		37,841	66.2	+0.5
Registered electors		57,166		
UUP hold		Swing		

=== Elections in the 1920s ===
1929 general election: Belfast East
Party	Candidate	Votes	%
UUP	Herbert Dixon	27,855	75.1
Ulster Liberal	Denis Ireland	9,230	24.9
Majority		18,625	50.2
Turnout		37,085	65.7
UUP hold			

1924 general election: Belfast East
Party	Candidate	Votes	%	±%
UUP	Herbert Dixon	Unopposed		
Registered electors				
UUP hold				

1923 general election: Belfast East
Party	Candidate	Votes	%	±%
UUP	Herbert Dixon	Unopposed		
Registered electors				
UUP hold				

1922 general election: Belfast East
Party	Candidate	Votes	%	±%
UUP	Herbert Dixon	Unopposed		
Registered electors				
UUP win (seat recreated)				

=== Elections in the 1910s ===
1914 Belfast East by-election
Party	Candidate	Votes	%	±%
Irish Unionist	Robert Sharman-Crawford	Unopposed		
Registered electors				
Irish Unionist hold				

December 1910 general election: Belfast East
Party	Candidate	Votes	%	±%
Irish Unionist	R. J. McMordie	Unopposed		
Registered electors				
Irish Unionist hold				

January 1910 general election: Belfast East
Party	Candidate	Votes	%	±%
Irish Unionist	Gustav Wilhelm Wolff	Unopposed		
Registered electors				
Irish Unionist hold				

=== Elections in the 1900s ===
1906 general election: Belfast East
Party	Candidate	Votes	%	±%
Irish Unionist	Gustav Wilhelm Wolff	Unopposed		
Registered electors				
Irish Unionist hold				

1900 general election: Belfast East
Party	Candidate	Votes	%	±%
Irish Unionist	Gustav Wilhelm Wolff	Unopposed		
Registered electors				
Irish Unionist hold				

=== Elections in the 1890s ===
1895 general election: Belfast East
Party	Candidate	Votes	%	±%
Irish Unionist	Gustav Wilhelm Wolff	Unopposed		
Registered electors				
Irish Unionist hold				

1892 general election: Belfast East
Party	Candidate	Votes	%	±%
Irish Unionist	Gustav Wilhelm Wolff	Unopposed		
Registered electors				
Irish Unionist hold				

1892 Belfast East by-election
Party	Candidate	Votes	%	±%
Irish Unionist	Gustav Wilhelm Wolff	4,746	64.6	–15.7
Ind. Unionist	William Thomas Charley	2,607	35.4	New
Majority		2,139	29.2	–31.6
Turnout		7,353	64.8	–7.8
Registered electors		11,339		
Irish Unionist hold		Swing		

=== Elections in the 1880s ===
1886 general election: Belfast East
Party	Candidate	Votes	%	±%
Irish Conservative	Edward de Cobain	5,055	80.3	+35.9
Irish Parliamentary	Robert McCalmont	1,239	19.7	New
Majority		3,816	60.6	N/A
Turnout		6,294	72.6	–6.2
Registered electors		8,666		
Irish Conservative gain from Ind. Conservative		Swing		

1885 general election: Belfast East
Party	Candidate	Votes	%	±%
Ind. Conservative	Edward de Cobain	3,033	44.4	
Irish Conservative	James Corry	2,929	42.9	
Liberal	Robert Wallace Murray	870	12.7	
Majority		104	1.5	
Turnout		6,832	78.8	
Registered electors		8,666		
Ind. Conservative win (new seat)				

== See also ==
- List of parliamentary constituencies in Northern Ireland
