= Addie Morrow =

Northern Ireland politician (1928–2012)

Deputy Leader of the Alliance Party of Northern Ireland
- In office 1984–1987
- Leader: John Cushnahan

Member of Castlereagh Borough Council
- In office 15 May 1985 – 17 May 1989
- Preceded by: District created
- Succeeded by: William Boyd
- Constituency: Castlereagh East
- In office 30 May 1973 – 15 May 1985
- Preceded by: Council established
- Succeeded by: District abolished
- Constituency: Castlereagh Area B

Member of the Northern Ireland Assembly for Belfast East
- In office 20 October 1982 – 1986

Personal details
- Born: 17 July 1928 County Down, Northern Ireland
- Died: 30 March 2012 (aged 83) County Down, Northern Ireland
- Party: Alliance Party

Addie James Morrow (17 July 1928 in County Down, Northern Ireland – 30 March 2012 in County Down) was a politician in Northern Ireland.

== Background ==
Born on a farm in County Down, Morrow was an early member of the ecumenical Corrymeela Community, later led by his brother John.

Morrow was an early member of the Alliance Party of Northern Ireland (APNI), and was elected to Castlereagh Borough Council in 1973, holding his seat at each subsequent election, until standing down in 1989.

In 1982, Morrow was elected to the Northern Ireland Assembly, representing Belfast East. At the 1983 general election, he stood unsuccessfully in Strangford, taking 15% of the vote. In 1984, under John Cushnahan, Morrow became APNI's deputy leader.

At the 1987 general election, Morrow increased his share of the vote in Strangford to 20%. For the 1992 general election, he switched to contest North Down, taking just under 15%. Morrow became APNI's chair, but stood down in 1993, citing disappointment at the failure of other parties to use the Brooke-Mayhew Talks to reach agreement. Morrow later became APNI's president. Morrow died on 30 March 2012 in his family home on the farm he was brought up in. He was 83 years old.

Northern Ireland Assembly (1982)
New assembly	MPA for East Belfast; 1982–1986	Assembly abolished
Party political offices
Preceded by David Cook	Deputy Leader of the Alliance Party of Northern Ireland; 1984–87	Succeeded by Gordon Mawhinney
