= David Callender Campbell =

David Callender Campbell may refer to:

- David Callender Campbell (naturalist) (1860–1926), Irish businessman and naturalist
- Sir David Campbell (Belfast South MP) (1891–1963), Ulster Unionist politician, nephew of the above

== See also ==
- David Campbell (disambiguation)
