= Thomas Carnduff =

Writer from Northern Ireland

Thomas Carnduff (30 January 1886 – 17 April 1956) was a working-class Irish poet, playwright and socialist active in his native Belfast.

Carnduff was born in Belfast. He was raised in the Protestant working-class district of Sandy Row, worked in the city's shipyards (where in 1920 he purportedly helped Catholic workers escape across the Lagan River from the fury of Protestant pogromists), and was a member of the early labour-supporting Independent Orange Order.

Carnduff was an admirer of Robert Lindsay Crawford who in 1903 had co-founded the Independent Orange Order with Thomas Sloan, Independent MP for South Belfast, as a protest against what they saw as the co-optation of the established Orange Order by the Ulster Unionist Party and its alignment with the interests of landlords and employers. Carnduff concluded that:"the lamentable condition of Ireland is mainly attributable to the false conception of nationality" and he welcomed Crawford's call in his Magheramorne Manifesto of 1904 for Irish Protestants to "reconsider their position as Irish citizens and their attitude towards their Roman Catholic countrymen". This, however, was the position that was to lead to Crawford's eventual break with Sloan and his expulsion from the Order in 1908.

Carnduff saw action in World War 1, and, after partition, served in the Northern Ireland police reserve, the B Specials.

His first collection of poetry Songs from the Shipyards was published in 1924. In the 1930s, there were a series of plays, four of which were staged both by the Abbey Theatre in Dublin and by the Empire Theatre in Belfast. Workers, Traitors, Machinery and Castlereagh.

In Castlereagh (1935). Carnduff celebrated the United Irishman, James (Jemmy) Hope, the weaver from Templepatrick who insisted that the real causes of social disorder in Ireland were "the conditions of the labouring class". Carnduff was a friend of Peadar O'Donnell, socialist and "somewhat erratic republican", and was drawn to the left-republican Connolly Association formed in 1938.

From 1951 to 1954, he was the resident caretaker for the Linen Hall Library in Belfast where he is commemorated with a Blue Plaque and a portrait. He died in Belfast in 1956.
