= 1902 Belfast South by-election =

UK Parliamentary by-election

The 1902 Belfast South by-election was held on 18 August 1902 after the death of the Irish Unionist Party MP William Johnston. It was won by the Independent Unionist candidate Thomas Sloan.

== Candidates ==
The Conservatives considered several candidates, who declined to stand. These included Colonel Robert Wallace, just returned from the Second Boer War in South Africa, who declined for business reasons; and Sir James Henderson, a previous Lord Mayor of Belfast. The shipbuilder and businessman William Pirrie (who had also been a Lord Mayor of Belfast) was also informally approached. They eventually picked Charles Buller, a former High Sheriff of Down and son-in-law of a previous MP for Belfast, George Dunbar.

Thomas Sloan was a sub-contractor for the cementing of ship's floors at the shipyard of Harland and Wolff, who had during 1902 become a leading member of the working class Belfast Protestant Association, after the association's founder Arthur Trew was imprisoned for inciting an anti-Catholic riot. He declared his candidacy as an independent unionist in protest of the treatment of Trew.

Thomas Harrison, who had unsuccessfully contested Belfast North in the 1900 general election was mentioned as a candidate for the "labour interest", but nothing came of this.

== Issues and campaign ==
The campaign was tumultuous, and the Belfast Protestant Association dominated the campaign, protesting the imprisonment of their founder. The Times reported that a final meeting for Dunbar Buller on 15 August was broken up by supporters of Slone, with only a large force of police preventing a more serious disturbance.

== Result ==
The result of the election was announced outside Belfast town hall on the eve of election day, 18 August 1902. Sloan won the election by 826 votes, and was declared the new representative.

Belfast South by-election, 1902
Party	Candidate	Votes	%	±%
Ind. Unionist	Thomas Sloan	3,795	56.1	N/A
Irish Unionist	Charles William Dunbar Buller	2,969	43.9	N/A
Majority		826	12.2	N/A
Turnout		6,764	66.0	N/A
Registered electors		10,246		
Ind. Unionist gain from Irish Unionist		Swing	N/A	

Sloan later founded the Independent Orange Order and reached an agreement with the Irish Unionist Party to disassociate himself from the Belfast Protestant Association. Sloan retained the seat in the 1906 general election.
