= Belfast South by-election, 1917 =

Belfast South by-election, 1917 may refer to:

- April 1917 Belfast South by-election
- July 1917 Belfast South by-election
