= David Campbell =

David or Dave Campbell may refer to:

== Academia ==
- David Kelly Campbell (born 1944), American physicist
- David George Campbell (born 1949), American professor and writer
- David Campbell (Australian political scientist) (born 1961), Australian political scientist
- David E. Campbell (political scientist) (born 1971), Canadian political scientist

== Entertainment and literature ==
- David Campbell (poet) (1915–1979), Australian poet
- David Campbell (painter) (born 1936), American realist painter
- David Ray Campbell (born 1954), American television writer, theater producer, and comedy manager
- David E. Campbell (sound engineer), American sound engineer
- David Campbell (singer) (born 1973), Australian singer, actor, and TV personality

== Law ==
- David Campbell (judge, born 1750) (1750–1812), territorial and state judge in North Carolina and Tennessee
- David G. Campbell (born 1952), American federal judge
- David Campbell (legal academic) (born 1958), British legal academic

== Music ==
- David Campbell (composer) (born 1948), Canadian-American musician and arranger
- David Campbell (clarinetist) (born 1953), British classical clarinetist
- David Campbell (singer) (born 1973), Australian singer, stage actor and television presenter

== Politics ==
- David Campbell (Down politician), member of the Irish Parliament, MP for Bangor, 1692–1698
- David Campbell (Virginia politician) (1779–1859), governor of Virginia, 1837–1840
- David Campbell (Manitoba politician) (1870–1932), Manitoba Liberal Party leader
- David Robb Campbell (1874/5–1934), Irish trade unionist and politician
- Sir David Campbell (Belfast South MP) (1891–1963), Northern Irish politician
- David L. Campbell (born 1944), member of the Michigan House of Representatives
- David Campbell (Australian politician) (born 1957), New South Wales police and transport minister
- David Campbell (New Hampshire politician) (born 1957), New Hampshire House of Representatives
- David Campbell (Northern Ireland politician, born 1965) (born 1965), Northern Ireland politician and businessman

== Sports ==
=== Association football ===
- Dave Campbell (footballer, born 1947) (1947–2013), Welsh footballer
- David Campbell (footballer, born 1965), Northern Irish footballer
- Dave Campbell (footballer, born 1969), Irish footballer

=== Baseball ===
- David Campbell (second baseman) (1908–1961), American Negro league baseball player
- Dave Campbell (infielder) (born 1942), American baseball infielder and broadcaster
- Dave Campbell (pitcher) (born 1951), American baseball pitcher

=== Gridiron football ===
- Dave Campbell (American football) (1873–1949), American football player
- Dave Campbell (c. 1925–2021), American sportswriter and founder of American football magazine Dave Campbell's Texas Football
- Dave Campbell (Canadian football) (born c. 1951), Canadian football player

=== Other sports ===
- Dave Campbell (ice hockey) (1896–1975), Canadian ice hockey defenceman
- Dave Campbell (basketball) (1925–2015), Canadian basketball player
- David Campbell (runner) (born 1960), Canadian Olympic middle-distance runner
- Chad Campbell (David Chad Campbell, born 1974), American professional golfer

== Other people ==
- David Callender Campbell (naturalist) (1860–1926), Irish businessman and naturalist
- Sir David Campbell (British Army officer) (1869–1936), British general and jockey, governor of Malta
- Sir David Campbell (pharmacologist) (1889–1978), Scottish physician and pharmacologist
- David N. Campbell (born 1941), American charity executive, All Hands Volunteers founder and chairman
- David P. Campbell (1943–2009), American psychologist
- David Campbell (admiral) (born 1945), Australian rear admiral, Deputy Chief of Navy
- David James Campbell (born 1983), Australian advertising executive
- David Campbell, fictional character in The Dalek Invasion of Earth

== Boats ==
- David Campbell (1912 fireboat), a fireboat built in 1912 for Oregon's Portland Fire and Rescue
- David Campbell (1927 fireboat), a fireboat built in 1928 for Oregon's Portland Fire and Rescue
