= Caleb Foundation =

Pressure group in Northern Ireland

The Caleb Foundation, created in 1998, is a creationist pressure group in Northern Ireland. It also lobbies on a range of social policy issues such as abortion and same-sex marriage from an evangelical Protestant perspective, and has been particularly influential with Democratic Unionist Party ministers in the Northern Ireland Executive. The organisation has described its mission as "promoting the fundamentals of the historic evangelical Protestant faith".

== Structure, leadership and influence ==
The Foundation was launched at a meeting held in the Park Avenue Hotel, Belfast on 16 October 1998, following an initial meeting in Ballymoney in February 1998 attended by delegates from a number of small evangelical Protestant churches. It is not a membership organisation.

The Foundation is led by a "Council of Reference" which includes a number of politicians, ministers and pastors from a variety of Protestant sects. The largest single denomination represented is the Free Presbyterian Church founded by Rev. Ian Paisley, with others including the Congregational Union of Ireland, the Evangelical Presbyterian, Independent Methodist, Baptist, Reformed Presbyterian, Congregational Reformed and Elim Pentecostal churches, the Church of the Nazarene and the Evangelical Protestant Society. As of 2012, members of the council included Ron Johnstone, who succeeded Paisley as leader of the Free Presbyterian Church; DUP MLA Mervyn Storey, also a Free Presbyterian; Philip Campbell, Convenor of the Public Morals Committee of the Congregational Union, and Free Presbyterian minister Alan Smylie, who conducted the funeral service for Shankill Butcher Robert Bates.

Its first chairman, until his death in 2007, was George Dawson, an activist in Paisley's Democratic Unionist Party (DUP) and subsequently a DUP MLA. Dawson was Grand Master of the Independent Orange Order and Treasurer of the Evangelical Protestant Society. On his death, Rev. William Park became acting chairman. Its secretary for some time after the launch in 1998, David McConaghie acted until late 2012 as its press spokesman, and held other offices in the Foundation's Council of Reference. Wallace Thompson of the Evangelical Protestant Society, who had been the Foundation's treasurer since 1998, succeeded as chairman of the Foundation in September 2009, Park becoming vice-chairman. Thompson, who was a founding member of the DUP, is also an Orangeman, a former Northern Ireland Office civil servant, and a former ministerial adviser to Nigel Dodds. It was while employed in the last role, in 2008, that Thompson in a radio interview denounced the Pope as the Antichrist. Thompson is a member of the Public Morals Committee of the Evangelical Presbyterian Church. The secretary of the Foundation is Rev. Philip Campbell, Congregational minister in Coleraine. who replaced Rev Robert McEvoy in June 2013. This change formed part of an organisational re-structuring of the Foundation with the establishment of a steering committee which is empowered to make decisions and respond to events.

Documenting the influence of the Foundation within Northern Ireland unionist politics, and particularly the DUP, the Belfast Telegraph noted in 2012 that politicians close to it included Northern Ireland health minister Edwin Poots, Minister for Social Development Nelson McCausland, junior minister Jonathan Bell, Diane Dodds MEP, Gregory Campbell MP, David Simpson MP, Paul Givan MLA, Stephen Moutray MLA (and mayor of Craigavon), Jim Allister, leader of Traditional Unionist Voice, and TUV press officer and East Antrim parliamentary candidate Sammy Morrison. A leading Belfast Telegraph journalist wrote on another occasion that "Caleb plays a role within the DUP analogous to the old Militant tendency within the Labour party". Also in 2012, the Irish Daily Star noted that Caleb "claims a support base of 200,000 evangelicals" and asked whether it had "overtaken the Orange Order as the most influential pressure group within Unionism".

== Activities ==
The Foundation's lobbying to have public bodies give at least equal coverage to creationist beliefs as to scientific evidence of evolution came to attention in 1999, when McConaghie wrote in the Belfast News Letter in response to the BBC television series Walking with Dinosaurs, calling for "equal prominence to be given to the Creation creed".

In 2006, McConaghie met senior officers of the Police Service of Northern Ireland to discuss the Foundation's request that figures for 'gay-on-gay' violence in Northern Ireland be collated and published, and that police figures for 'cohabiting same-sex' domestic violence be made available to the Foundation "for analysis".

In 2008, the Foundation's spokesman called for the banning of the Belfast Gay Pride parade, complaining of the "gratuitously offensive and deliberately provocative behaviour emanating from participants". Also in 2008, the Foundation's website carried a photograph of a shop window display in Enniskillen and asked: "Is one of Northern Ireland's leading clothes chains promoting homosexuality?", pointing out "a pair of female mannikins [sic.] in the window of their Enniskillen store, holding hands".

The Foundation lobbied the Ulster Museum in 2010 to feature creationist theories in its displays. The Foundation wrote to DUP minister Nelson McCausland and to National Museums Northern Ireland to express their concerns about the Museum's Nature Zone exhibits which described evolution as fact. McCausland subsequently wrote to the Museum trustees calling for alternative views of the origin of the universe to be accommodated in the museum's natural history displays.

In 2010, the British Centre for Science Education published an 11,000-word report which accused the Foundation of promoting Christian fascism and Dominionism, aiming to make Northern Ireland a "fundamentalist Protestant theocracy".

During 2011 and 2012 the Foundation's press officer, David McConaghie, by then a full-time DUP official, lobbied two DUP ministers in the Northern Ireland Executive – McCausland and Arlene Foster – to have creationist theories included in displays at the new visitor centre at the Giant's Causeway. The lobbying involved other DUP members and evangelical churches. The National Trust included a "younger Earth" version of the origins of the Giant's Causeway at the visitor centre. In July 2012 McConaghie welcomed this as "recognition of the view, held by scientists right across the spectrum, that the scientific evidence points to a much younger age of the universe and to the direct involvement of a Divine Creator". However, following widespread objections to the creationist content, the National Trust removed the display in October 2012.

The Foundation has also lobbied for more representation by evangelical churches on BBC Northern Ireland, and in opposition to the relaxation of Sunday trading laws, the extension of gay rights, the holding of sporting events on Sundays, a Marie Stopes clinic in Belfast and same-sex marriage. McConaghie met senior personnel from education bodies to lobby for the inclusion of a creationist viewpoint in the Northern Ireland curriculum. Other issues on which the Caleb Foundation has lobbied include the reform of prostitution laws, raising the retail price of alcohol and limiting pub opening hours, opposing the review of the abortion laws to include rape and foetal abnormality, and banning of gay adoption. While it did not specifically lobby for a ban on blood donation by gay men, it "approved of the position of the minister" Edwin Poots in retaining the ban.

In November 2012, the Caleb Foundation announced that McConaghie had "voluntarily stepped down" from his role as its press officer, after he was arrested and charged with concealing a camera to spy on women in a toilet cubicle for purposes of sexual gratification. In October 2015, McConaghie was convicted of voyeurism for the offence, and subsequently jailed for three months and added to the sex offenders register for seven years.
