= 1963 Belfast South by-election =

UK parliamentary by-election

The 1963 Belfast South by-election of 22 October 1963 was held after the death of Ulster Unionist Party Member of Parliament (MP) Sir David Campbell on 12 June the same year. The seat was retained by the Ulster Unionists.

== Result ==
1963 Belfast South by-election
Party	Candidate	Votes	%	±%
UUP	Rafton Pounder	17,989	64.3	−5.6
NI Labour	Norman Searight	7,209	25.8	+4.2
Ulster Liberal	Albert Hamilton	2,774	9.9	+2.4
Majority		10,780	38.5	−9.8
Turnout		27,972	48.3	−23.8
Registered electors		57,864		
UUP hold		Swing		
