= Thomas Vincent Campbell =

Northern Irish physician (1863–1930)

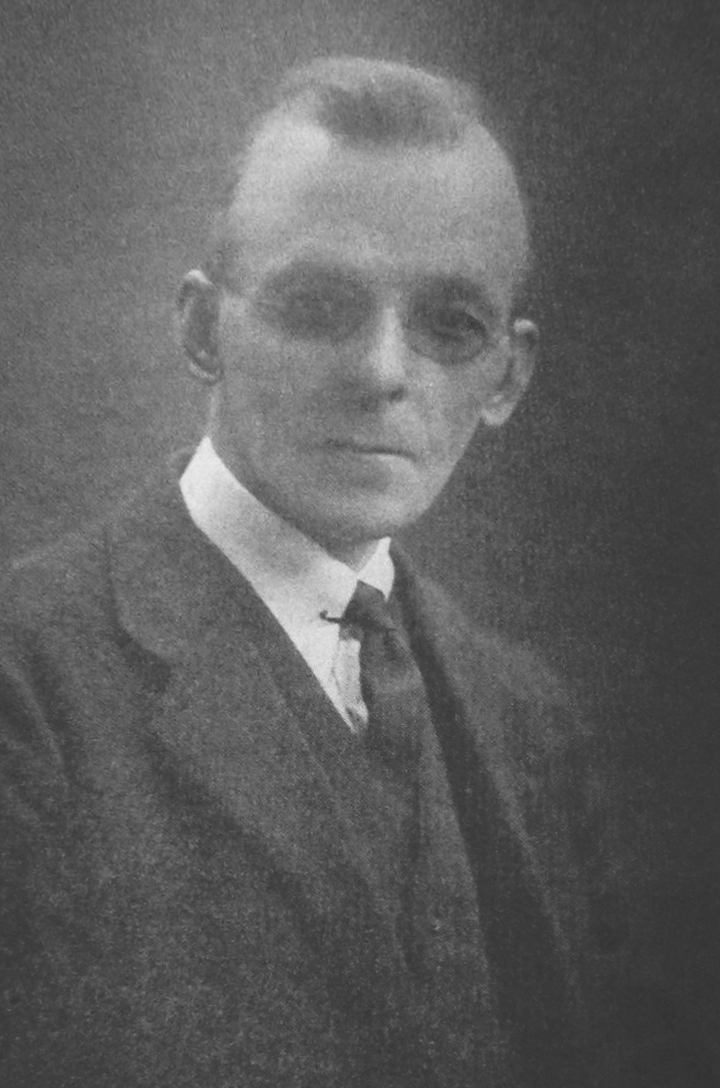
- Born: April 23, 1863; Derry, Northern Ireland
- Died: December 16, 1930
- Occupations: physician, missionary and entomological collector
- Known for: public health work

Thomas Vincent Campbell (23 June 1863 – 16 December 1930) was a physician, missionary and an entomological collector in India. He helped establish sanatoria for tuberculosis treatment in Madanapalle, a hospital in Jammalamadugu which is now named after him, and the Ralph Wardlaw Thompson memorial hospital at Chikkaballapur (now known as the CSI Hospital) and was awarded a Kaiser-i-Hind for his contributions to the health of the poor. His collections of Hemiptera from India resulted in the descriptions of many new species of bug, several of which were named after him.

== Life and work ==
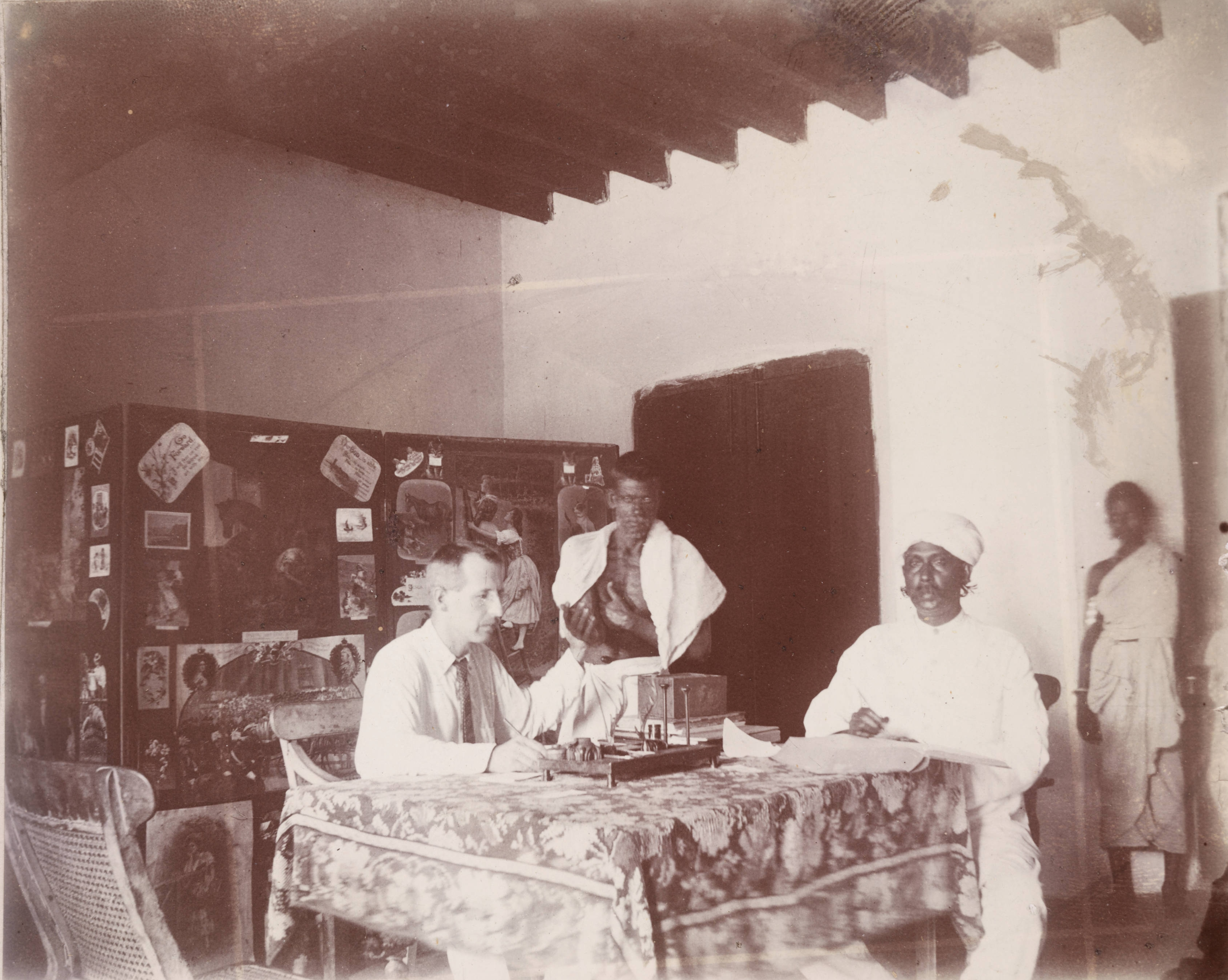
Campbell at the Ralph Wardlaw Thompson hospital in Chikkaballapur, c. 1912

Campbell was born in Ballynagard, Derry in 1863, one of nine siblings born to businessman Thomas Callender Campbell and his wife, who was of Scottish origin came from Leith. He went to school in Derry and then graduated Bachelor of Medicine and Bachelor of Surgery (MB) from Edinburgh in 1888 where his older brother William Howard Campbell (1859 - 1910) had also studied around the same time. Both brothers excelled in athletics for which they were well known at the university. The brothers also had a family natural history collection at home in Derry that was considered to be impressive. Thomas followed his brother in 1890 to work with the London Missionary Society at Jammalamadugu in Cuddapah district in India. Here he established the LMS hospital in 1896.

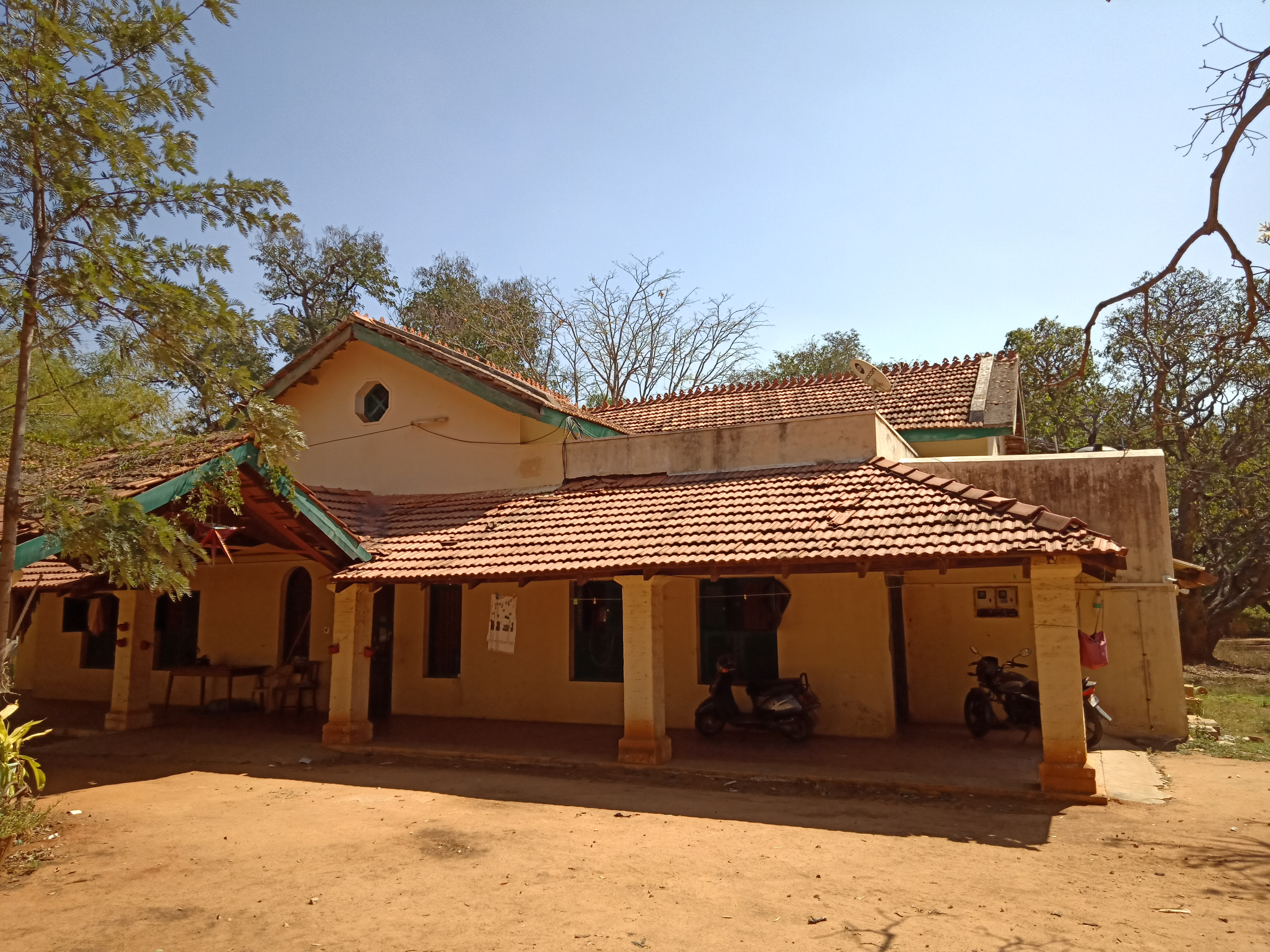
Campbell's home in Chikballapur (as seen in 2019)

Campbell married physician Florence Gertrude (born 1866, daughter of John William Longbottom and his second wife Elizabeth) of Halifax on 29 August 1891. Together they worked in India but exposure to patients led to him contracting tuberculosis and he returned to England to convalesce. Treated by his wife, he recovered and they returned to India to establish the Ralph Wardlaw Thompson memorial hospital in Chikkaballapura. Wardlaw Thompson (1842-1916) was a Bellary-born missionary who had served as the foreign secretary of the London Missionary Society from 1881 to 1914. Campbell's wife worked on the health of women while his work included the treatment of nearly a thousand cases of cataract. In 1908 he was awarded the Kaisar-i-Hind medal for his services to public health. He also proposed the establishment of sanatoria for the treatment of tuberculosis and this resulted in the founding of several including the Madanapalle TB sanatorium. After his retirement, he settled in Edinburgh where he joined the Royal Physical Society of Edinburgh in 1919 serving as its treasurer from 1922 until his death.

== Contribution to entomology ==
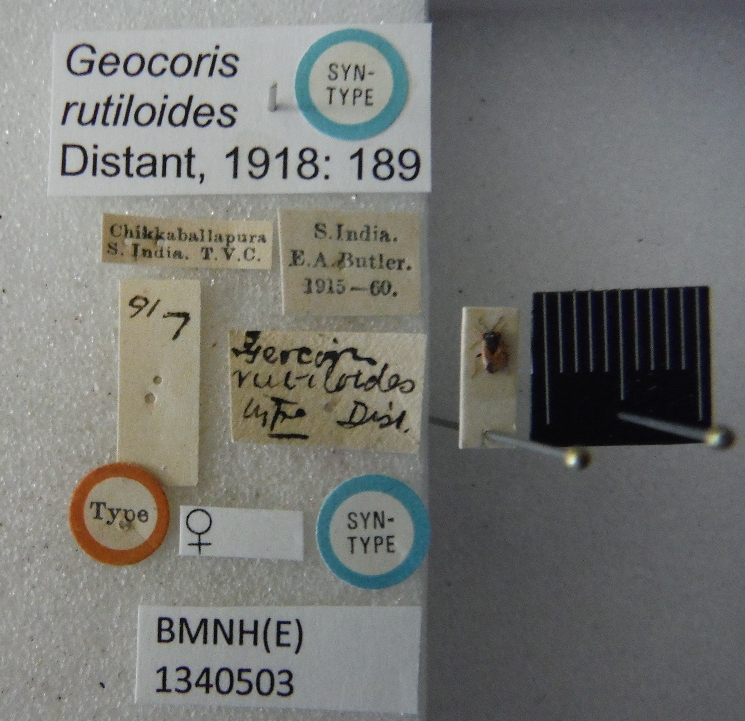
A specimen in the NHM, London

Known among his friends as "T.V.", Campbell also took a keen interest in the insects. He was initially interested in the Lepidoptera like four other brothers of his. He later took an interest in the bugs, Hemiptera, collecting nearly 15,000 specimens of which nearly 244 became type specimens. Nearly 3000 of his specimens were sent to his correspondent E.A. Butler. Campbell collected specimens mainly from southern India, especially from Chikaballapura, Nandidrug, Kodaikanal and the Nilgiris. These were deposited in the Natural History Museum, London after the death of Butler while a few specimens were deposited in the Royal Scottish Museum. Campbell himself never published on the topic but many notes on the biology of many species that he communicated to Butler were incorporated by W.L. Distant in the Fauna of British India volume on the bugs. Distant named numerous species including Mondopa campbelli, Nisia campbelli, Kodaiana campbelli, Otinotus campbelli, Endochus campbelli, and the genus Campbellinella (now a synonym of Stirellus) after him. Distant described him as Butler's indefatigable friend and an excellent collector.

== Family ==
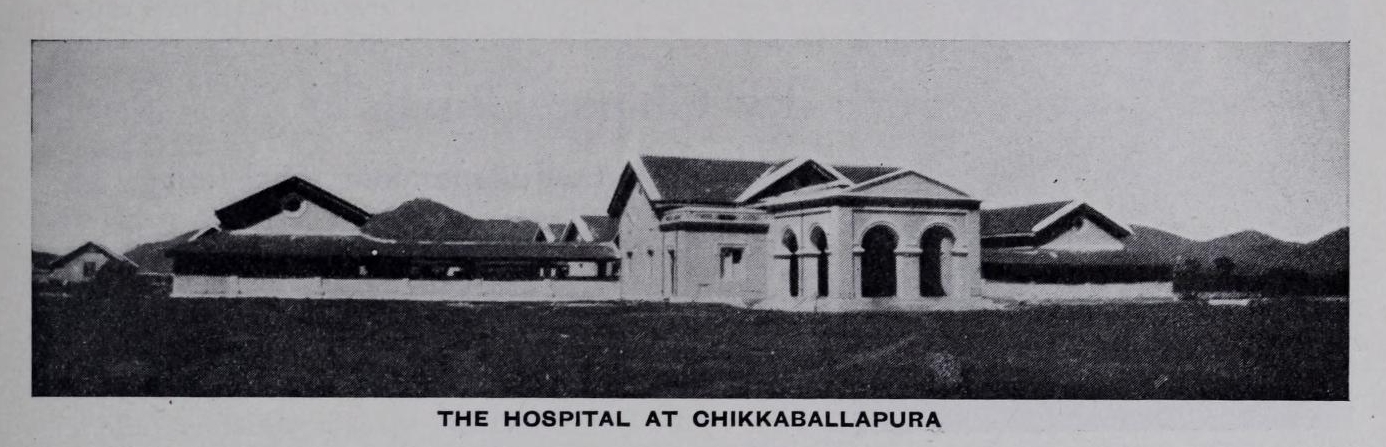
Ralph Wardlaw Thompson Hospital, Chikkaballapur

Campbell's brother David Callender Campbell (1860-1926) JP, MBOU of Derry was also a well-known naturalist with interests in birds and Lepidoptera. His collection of marine algae went to the Ulster Museum. His older brother William Howard Campbell, was the father of (later Sir) David Callender Campbell KBE, CMG (29 January 1891 – 12 June 1963).

Campbell died suddenly of a stroke on the morning of 16 December 1930 just after he had finished packing off his insect specimens for the British Museum. He left his wife, two sons and two daughters. One son was a professor at the Madras Christian College while the other practiced medicine in Glasgow.

== Legacy ==
The hospital that Campbell started in Jammalamadugu is now known as the CSI Campbell Hospital. Chief minister of Andhra Pradesh, Y. S. Rajasekhara Reddy, was born in the hospital and in later years, shortly after his medical training, served as a medical officer at the hospital. A statue of Campbell was erected on the median of the road opposite the hospital in 2021.

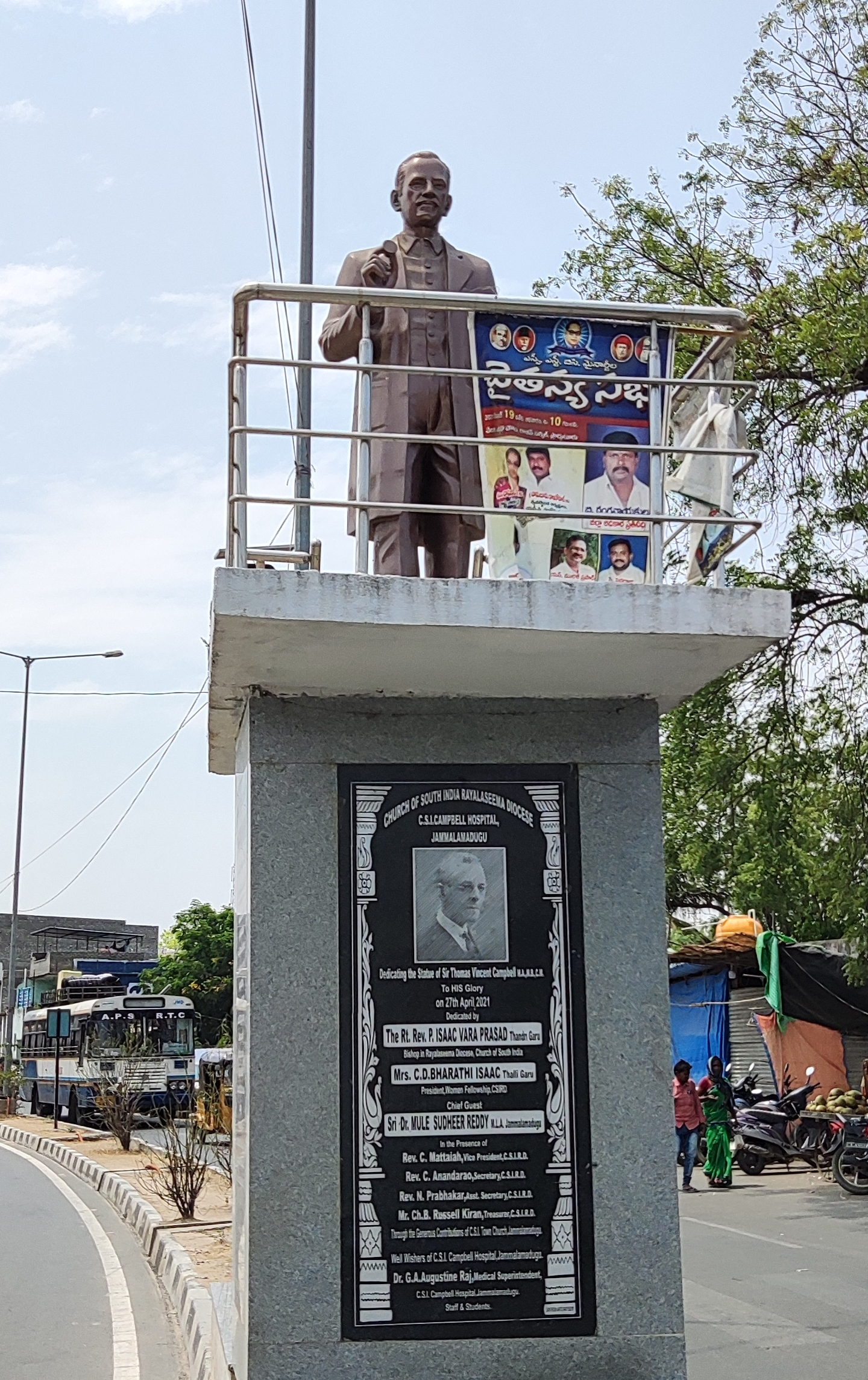
Statue in Jammalamadugu

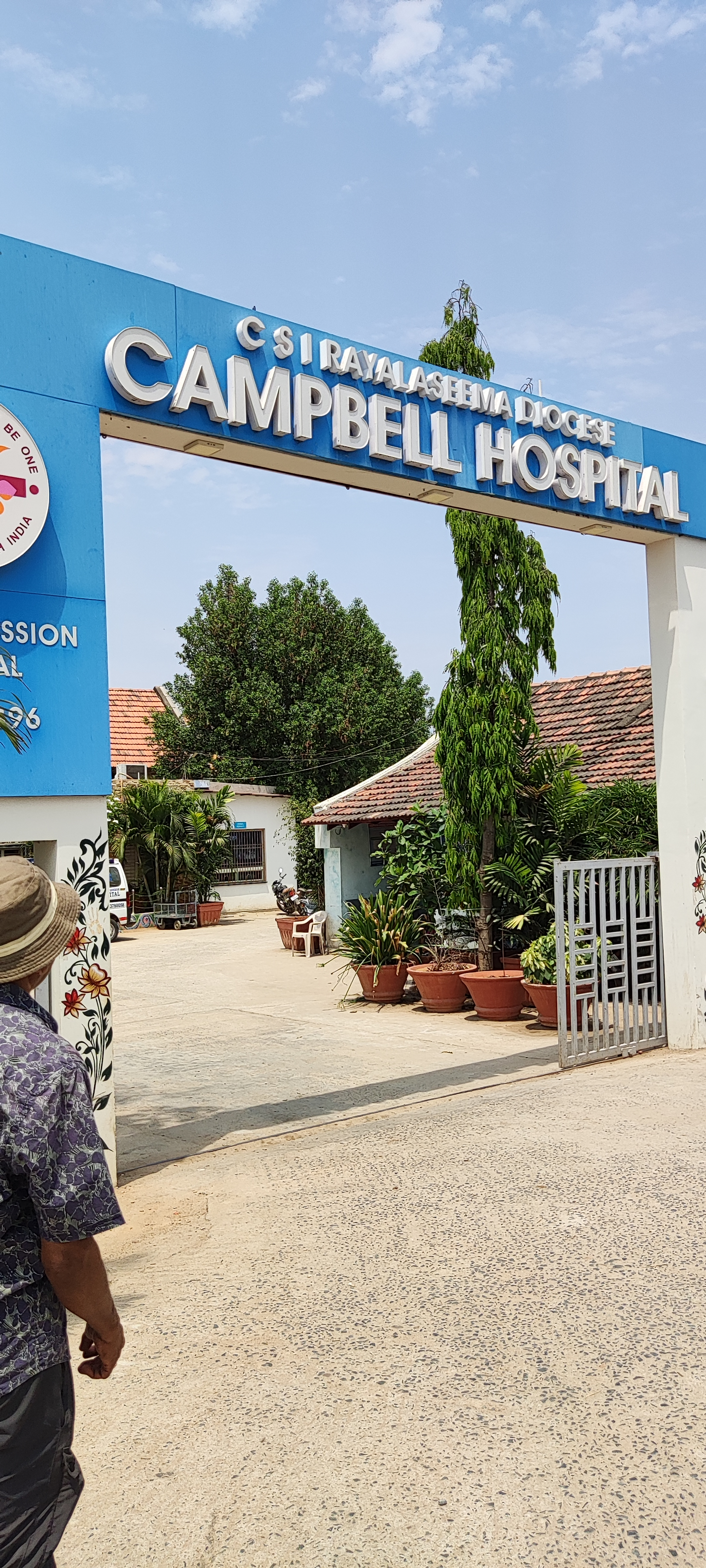
Entrance of the hospital in 2022

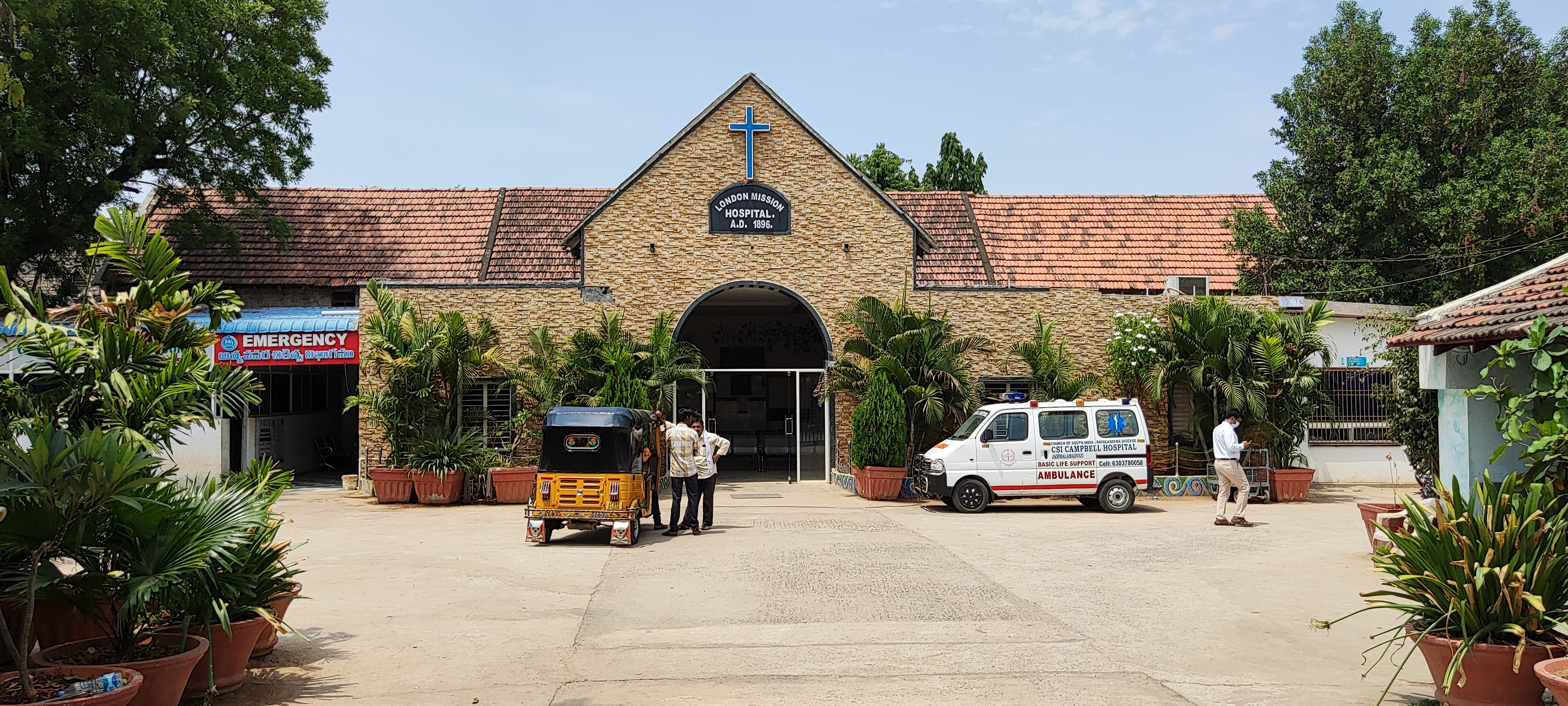
CSI Campbell Hospital

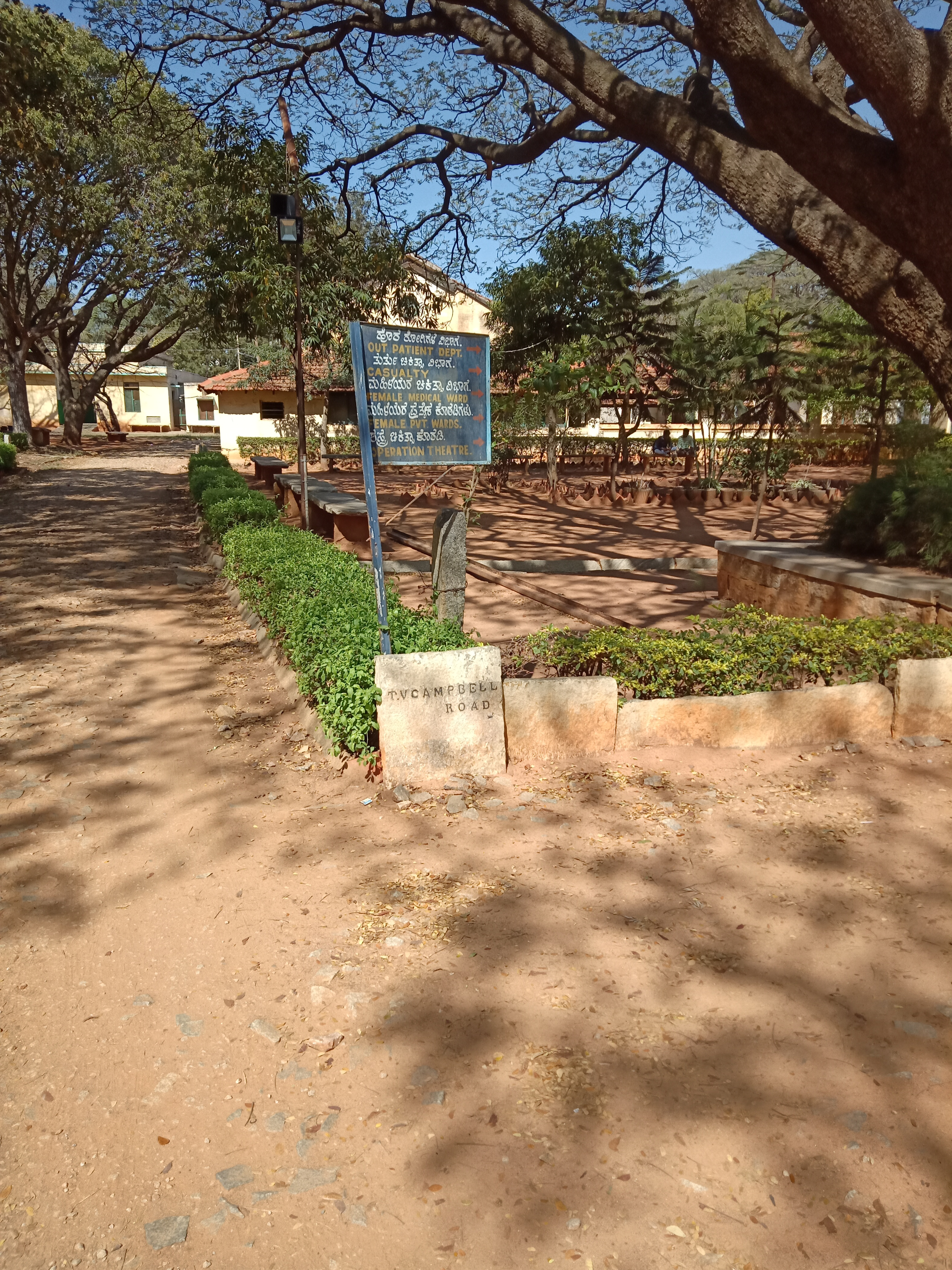
T.V. Campbell road inside the hospital premises at Chikballapur
