= Evangelical Protestant Society =

The Evangelical Protestant Society (EPS) is a pressure group representing Christian evangelicalism in Northern Ireland. It was founded in Belfast in 1946 and opposes what it terms "liberalism and false ecumenism", "Romanism" and "Popery".

== History ==
The EPS sought, as did the National Union of Protestants (NUP), to serve as an umbrella organisation for evangelicals in the various Protestant denominations and organisations. The Union collapsed in the early 1950s and Norman Porter, who had been the NUP's director since 1948, took over as secretary of the EPS in 1953. In the same year Porter was elected an Independent Unionist MP in the Northern Ireland general election, losing the seat in 1958 and failing to retake it in 1959 and 1969.

The Society has published a range of Protestant literature and a free quarterly magazine, The Ulster Bulwark. Its representatives have addressed meetings and services across Northern Ireland and beyond. The EPS sought to modernise its operations in 2000-01, and, today, much of its work is media based. The work is directed by the EPS Council, and the day-to-day work is undertaken by the secretary, who also edits The Ulster Bulwark.

== Prominent members ==
Porter's successors as secretary included Seamus Milligan, and Ray Pulman. Pulman, a former assistant minister of the Congregational Reformed Church who was involved with the EPS from 1997, was a former secretary of ILOL6, a member lodge of the Independent Grand Orange Lodge but in 2001 abandoned Orangeism on theological grounds.

The current part-time secretary, Wallace Thompson, in 2009 also became chairman of the creationist pressure group the Caleb Foundation. Thompson, a member of the Evangelical Presbyterian Church, the Independent Orange Order and the Apprentice Boys of Derry, is a former civil servant. In 2008, while employed as an adviser to Nigel Dodds, a minister in the Northern Ireland Executive, Thompson caused some controversy by asserting in a radio interview (in his capacity as EPS secretary) that the Pope was the Antichrist.

Others who (as of December 2012) hold senior posts in the EPS include its president Rev. Dr William J. Malcolmson, a minister of the Congregational Reformed Church in east Belfast, and an activist in the Orange Order and Royal Black Institution, and its chairman Vincent Shortt, a member of the Presbyterian Church, the Orange Order, the Black Institution and the Apprentice Boys. David McConaghie, a Free Presbyterian minister and Democratic Unionist Party official, and a co-founder of the Caleb Foundation, served on the EPS Council from 1999 but his name disappeared from its website in late 2012. DUP politician George Dawson, who joined the EPS Council in 2001, was its treasurer at the time of his death in 2007.
