= Robert Lindsay Crawford =

Irish Protestant politician and journalist

(Robert) Lindsay Crawford
- Born: 1 October 1868; Lisburn, County Antrim, Ireland
- Died: 3 June 1945 (aged 76); New York City
- Citizenship: United Kingdom, Canada, United States
- Notable work: Irish Protestant, Magheramorne Manifesto.
- Movement: Independent Orange Order, Self-Determination for Ireland League of Canada and Newfoundland

Robert Lindsay Crawford (1 October 1868 – 3 June 1945), known as Lindsay Crawford, was an Irish Protestant politician and journalist who shifted in his loyalties from Unionism and the Orange Order to the Irish Free State. He was a co-founder of the Independent Orange Order through which he hoped to promote Irish reconciliation and democracy. Later he became a committed Irish nationalist mobilizing support in Canada for Irish self-determination and serving the new Irish state as its trade representative and consul in New York City.

== Independent Orangeman ==
Crawford was born in Tonagh, Lisburn, County Antrim on 1 October 1868, son of James Crawford, who recorded his profession as "scripture reader", and Matilda Crawford (née Hastings). Educated privately, he worked for a time in business before becoming, in 1901, the founding editor in Dublin of the evangelical Irish Protestant. The paper, in terms of the wider southern unionist press, was "a lone voice of protest against the Conservative administration".

In 1903, with Thomas Sloan, Independent MP for South Belfast, he co-founded the Independent Orange Order (I.O.O.). It was a protest against co-optation of the established Orange Order (from which Crawford had been expelled) by the Ulster Unionist Party and its alignment with the interests of landlords and employers. In the Irish Protestant (November 1901) Crawford had vowed to oppose "the Divine Right of Toryism" for the wider benefit of "Protestant democracy". In an interview with the Irish Independent (22 July 1905), he proposed that the I.O.O. was "essentially a democratic movement and is a revolt against the feudal system that has so long prevailed in our country". Crawford outlined the new order's democratic manifesto in Orangeism, its history and progress: a plea for first principles (1904).

His attempts, as Grand Master, to promote the Independent order as "strongly Protestant, strongly democratic" and "strongly Irish", and his call in the Magheramorne Manifesto (1904) on Irish Protestants to "reconsider their position as Irish citizens and their attitude towards their Roman Catholic countrymen" led to a break with Sloan and the Order's more determined unionist and sectarian membership. Within the IOO, he had not been without prominent support. Shipyard poet and playwright Thomas Carnduff, who discovered that many of his fellow lodge members were "intensely Irish in their outlook", had welcomed the manifesto.

== Anti-clericalist democrat ==
In the south, Crawford found allies in the Reverend James Owen Hannay (better known as the novelist George A. Birmingham) and his personal network of Irish Irelanders. These included Gaelic League President Douglas Hyde and the principal ideologue of the emergent Sinn Féin movement, United Irishman editor Arthur Griffith. Hannay likened the IOO to the Gaelic League, finding them both "profoundly democratic in spirit" and independent of "the rich and the patronage of the great".

While not unsympathetic to the tenets of the Gaelic League, Crawford was critical of what he regarded as the impractical romanticism of the Irish-Ireland movement. He suggested that the Gaelic League needed an injection of "Ulsteria", an "industrial awakening on true economic lines: it is wrong when people crave bread to offer them 'language and culture'".

When, in a lecture Crawford suggested that, as unionists feared, Home Rule might lead to Rome Rule, the United Irishman accused Crawford of "seeing the Pope in every bush". Hannay defended him. Much as they both craved "the union of the two Irish democracies", they were not going their eyes, or allow their Catholic "fellow countrymen", to "a priestly tyranny". The Irish Protestant, January 1904, suggested that "Rome Rule" was being abetted by "official [Party and Government] Unionism" that, in the fond hope of Catholic support, had "effaced Protestantism from its programme". In May 1904, with reference to the reform of local government, the paper declared it "a fundamental principle of Unionism, that government could not be entrusted to the majority in Ireland without prejudice to the civil and religious right of the loyal minority".

Crawford did concede, however, that clericalism was not a problem confined to Catholicism. An Irish Protestant editorial of October 1905 proposed that "Protestant Democracy in Ulster is struggling towards the light of national liberty against the combined forces of clericalism and plutocracy" with evidence of "intolerant dominion" of the former "to be found in Protestant Ulster equally with Roman Catholic Munster". In a lecture and pamphlet (Irish Grievances and Their Remedy, June 1905) in which he allowed that Irish Protestants had been "frightened" out of their right to Irish citizenship, Crawford argued that this two-sided clericalism robbed Irishmen, Protestant and Catholic alike, of "a true conception of nationality" and "enabled English parties to sit in the market place and buy the Irish vote".

In remarks to a meeting in Belfast in December 1904, Crawford had concluded:

the woes of Ireland were mainly attributable to British mis-government--to the fact that Ireland had been governed, not on national but on sectarian lines; that the act of union had made, not for the uplifting and strengthening of the national and secular forces of the country, but for the conciliation and increased power and wealth of an intolerant irreconcilable ecclesiasticism that knows no country and recognises no superior civil authority.

Although, he was not advocating home rule. Crawford's "attack on the act of union for its failure to strengthen the ' national' as well as the 'secular forces of the country' was a new departure for even an independent Orange speaker",

In the Magheramorne Manifesto, Crawford had proposed that "the chief obstacle to the spread of democratic principles and to the supremacy of the people in national affairs" in Ireland, was the clerical control of education. For a later critic, this was a position that confirmed the "essential emptiness" of Crawford's vision of a reconciled and reformed Ireland. To ask the "Catholic masses of the south to withdraw their support from the political entente worked out between the Irish party and their Church on education" was to ask the impossible. Protestants could not demand the abandonment of Irish Catholic religious and cultural tradition as the price of their adherence to the national cause.

Crawford's call for "the national control of state-paid" education was (in the spirit of Thomas Davis) "sympathetically regarded by a prominent section of Gaelic revival activists" as well as by the IRB veteran Michael Davitt. But among nationalists it remained a decidedly minority, even fringe, demand. Crawford and Hannay's own Church rejected reform. The Church of Ireland Gazette dubbed Crawford "the solitary champion of secularism in the Synod.

In 1911, James Connolly, organising in Belfast for the Socialist Party of Ireland and for the Irish Transport and General Workers Union, quoted Crawford at length:

The trouble in Ireland is mainly attributable to the extreme sectarian influences — Orange and Green — that are still ranged in opposite camps on the banks of the Boyne. On one hand is the Orangeman, warm-hearted and generous despite his fanaticism, and who, in the sacred name of Protestantism, opposes the principles of good government imperishably associated with the Reformation and with the revolution of 1688. On the other hand is the Hibernian — kindly and tolerant in his individual capacity — who is kept in ignorance of the real aims and ambitions of his leaders and whose individuality is crushed under the iron heel of the caucus. These two organisations constitute the real obstacle to the peace and progress of our country, and their attitude towards each other is the more reprehensible in that each professes to be rooted in Christian principles.

== Non-conforming Liberal ==
Crawford addresses a Dublin rally in support of the Belfast dockers in 1907 alongside James Larkin and William Walker

When in 1906 he had exhausted his capital and credit, Crawford had to sell Irish Protestant to men opposed to his increasingly national and pro-labour outlook. One of his last contributions to the paper (9 June 1906) was an obituary for Michael Davitt that revealed Crawford's growing distance from majority unionist opinion. It called Davitt "the great apostle of democracy", citing his defence of Jews in the face of the Limerick boycott, his alliance with the Labour Party and his support of a system of state education. Against unionist criticism of the Land League, he describes Davitt and his Fenian allies as "waging a war" that was "legally ... indefensible", but morally not only "justifiable but a sacred duty". That Davitt in his anti-clericalism had been politically isolated among the Catholic laity, however, is cited a further evidence of the tenuousness of Crawford's radicalism.

In the February 1906 general election, Crawford and the rural lodges of the Independent Orange Order among whom he eclipsed Sloan as the dominant figure, supported the successful agrarian-reform candidates T. W. Russell in South Tyrone and R. G. Glendinning in North Antrim. Both MPs adopted the Liberal tag. In October the death of the landowning leader of Irish Unionism Edward Saunderson gave Crawford an opportunity to join them. But in the contest for the vacant North Armagh seat he has decisively defeated by the establishment Unionist candidate.

Unsuccessful as a Liberal candidate, Crawford nonetheless became editor of the Ulster Liberal Association (ULA) paper, the Ulster Guardian. But, here, as in the I.O.O., he soon found himself generating opposition. Before the end of 1907 Crawford had received two letters from the board. The first sanctioned him for his zealous reporting of labour issues. Crawford had actively supported the syndicalist James Larkin in the April to August Belfast dock strike and lockout, taking part in his public meetings. Crawford encouraged workers to stand firm for the sake not only of organised labour, but also of "the unity of all Irishmen". The second enjoined him from celebrating the United Irishmen (the likes of William Drennan and Thomas Russell) and the 1798 Rebellion as an example of progressive Protestantism. Inviting readers to look to the Protestant past for inspiration, Crawford had also authored a series of articles (January–February 1907) on Thomas Davis, founder of the Young Ireland political and cultural movement.

Crawford was defiant. The issue of 29 February 1908 contained reports of the parliamentary debate on the Sweated Industries Bill and a lecture on infant mortality in Ireland. It also reported Crawford's Independent Orange Lodge lecture "One hundred years of Irish history", in which he referred to sweating in the Belfast linen trade, and said that "the linen merchants of Ulster … were now the last buttress of toryism and Castle ascendancy in Ireland". In the same issue, Crawford explained that he himself "was not a socialist, nor did he believe in the accepted theory of socialism … But the socialistic theory was preferable to the economic heresy of the linen trusts and monopolists".

Ultimately it was on the grounds of his perceived nationalism that in May 1908 Crawford was dismissed: the owners of the Ulster Guardian "would not allow the paper to be used directly or indirectly in support of devolution or Home Rule". (For the ULA, Crawford's conversion to home rule been premature and perhaps a little too ardent. Supporting the policy of the nationalist-supported Liberal government in London, the Association and their chosen successor to Crawford at the Ulster Guardian, William Hamilton Davey, did come out in support of self-government). At the same time and for the same reason, Crawford was expelled from the I.O.O., and replaced as Imperial Grand Master by Sloan.

During the general election of 1910, Crawford appeared for the first time on a nationalist platform. In south Dublin he was "loudly cheered" when, speaking for the Home Rule candidate he claimed that a younger generation of Protestants was breaking away from "the evils of class and religious ascendancy" and that "national unity was more apparent than ever". But that same year, Crawford, with no obvious political home in Ireland, emigrated.

== Irish patriot in North America ==
From 1910 to 1918 Crawford lived in Canada working on the Toronto Globe. He reported on, and from, Ireland, but after the Easter Rising of 1916 his support for Irish self-determination placed him at odds with the Globe's liberal unionism. He wrote to the former Dominion Prime Minister Wilfrid Laurier asking whether, as a lead delegate to the 1918 Imperial Conference, he would be prepared to advocate both for Canada and for Ireland a scheme of "imperial federation." By implication it was a plea for Ireland to be granted the substantive independence of Dominion status.

In 1918 Crawford became the founding editor of the Statesman, in which he ran articles that mirrored his commitments to the Protestant Friends of Irish Freedom in New York and to the Self-Determination for Ireland League of Canada and Newfoundland (SDIL).

Introduced as "a stout-hearted son of Ulster", in April 1920 Crawford appeared on a Clan-na-Gael platform in New York City with Éamon de Valera in commemoration of the 1916 Rising. Working closely with de Valera loyalist Katherine Hughes, he was named the SDIL's national president at the League's Ottawa Convention in October 1920. In November he began a speaking tour of the Canadian provinces, encountering strong local Orange Order opposition. In Fredericton, New Brunswick, the audience drowned his words with "God Save the King"; in Moncton Crawford was attacked upon leaving the venue, and, according to the Orange Order's press organ, the Sentinel, forced to kiss the Union Jack;" in Newfoundland Catholic Archbishop, Edward Roche, cautioned the SDIL against sparking a sectarian war; and in Vancouver B. C., on the Canadian west coast, Crawford's public appearance was banned after his first riotous reception.

In response, Crawford argued that the fight for Irish self-determination was neither "racial nor religious in its origin" and he avoided declaring publicly for the republic. When he spoke in St. John's, Newfoundland in late November 1920, he appealed for "a broader spirit of toleration in the discussion of the Anglo-Irish problem," and the assembly concluded with renditions of both "God Save Ireland" and "God Save the King."

== Later life and family ==
From 1922 Crawford lived in New York City, serving first as trade commissioner and consul for the new the Irish Free State until 1929 and then, from 1933, as secretary of the American National Foreign Trade Council. As a delegate to the National Foreign Trade Convention, his emphasis at all times on the necessity of direct trade between the two countries resulted in shipping services for freight by the Oriole and Isthmian Lines. His aggressive campaign against the misuse of the trade name, 'Irish' also had its effects in decisions by the US Federal Trade Commission.

Crawford died in New York City on 3 June 1945 aged 76. He left a widow, Edith Church; a son Desmond L Crawford who, one month from the end of the War in Europe, was serving as a First Lieutenant with the U.S. Army in Italy, and two daughters, Miss Morna E. Crawford, in Italy with the American Red Cross, and Mrs Doris Crampton of Dublin.
