= George Dawson (Northern Ireland politician) =

Northern Ireland politician

- Dawson pictured at an Independent Orange Order event.

Member of the Northern Ireland Assembly for Antrim East
- In office 26 November 2003 – 7 May 2007
- Preceded by: Danny O'Connor
- Succeeded by: Alastair Ross

Personal details
- Born: 10 May 1961 Lurgan, Northern Ireland
- Died: 7 May 2007 (aged 45) Northern Ireland
- Party: Democratic Unionist Party
- Spouse: Vi Dawson
- Children: 2
- Education: Queen's University Belfast
- Website: georgedawson.org (Archived)

George Dawson (10 May 1961 – 7 May 2007) was a Democratic Unionist Party (DUP) politician who was a Member of the Northern Ireland Assembly (MLA) for East Antrim from 2003 to 2007.

== Background ==
Dawson was first elected to the Northern Ireland Assembly for East Antrim at the 2003 election. He died shortly after being re-elected to the Assembly in 2007, following a short battle with cancer. He was seen as a potential member of the power-sharing executive of the first minister, the DUP leader Ian Paisley, whose evangelical Protestant and strong unionist beliefs he shared.

Dawson was a founder in 1998, and was until his death the chairman, of the Caleb Foundation, a Christian fundamentalist pressure group. He was also Grand Master of the Independent Orange Order and Treasurer of the Evangelical Protestant Society.

Northern Ireland Assembly
| Preceded by Danny O'Connor | MLA for Antrim East; 2003–2007 | Succeeded by Alastair Ross |
