= 1952 Belfast South by-election =

UK parliamentary by-election

The 1952 Belfast South by-election was held following the resignation of Ulster Unionist Party (UUP) Member of Parliament, Conolly Gage.

== History ==
Belfast South had consistently elected UUP members since its recreation in 1922, and no Irish nationalist had even stood in the seat in that period. The opposition came from the labour movement. Gage had first won the seat at the 1945 general election, but he faced opponents from both the Commonwealth Labour Party (CWLP) and the Northern Ireland Labour Party (NILP), who, between them, had taken 48% of the vote. The CWLP had merged with the UUP in 1947, so by the 1950 general election, Gage was able to take three-quarters of the vote, the rest going to a NILP opponent. The vote shares barely changed at the 1951 general election.

== Candidates ==
The UUP selected David Campbell, while the NILP opted to stand their party secretary, Sam Napier. Napier had stood for the Northern Ireland House of Commons twice, for North Down in 1949 and for the Queen's University of Belfast in 1953.

== Result ==
The by-election was held on 4 November 1952. Campbell easily won the seat, taking more than three-quarters of the votes, in a near repeat of the result of the two previous general elections. He held the seat until his death in 1963.

1952 Belfast South by-election
Party	Candidate	Votes	%	±%
UUP	David Campbell	23,067	75.1	−0.7
NI Labour	Samuel Napier	7,655	24.9	+0.7
Majority		15,412	50.2	−1.4
Turnout		30,722	46.4	−27.4
Registered electors		65,196		
UUP hold		Swing		
