= National Union of Protestants =

The National Union of Protestants was a campaign group of evangelical Protestants in the United Kingdom.

== Foundation and early activities ==
The group was founded in or shortly before 1944, when it placed an advert in The Times setting out its principles, which centred on the elimination of various practices in the Church of England which it held were not in line with Protestantism. In particular, it was opposed to the celebration of Mass, belief in transubstantiation, the veneration of saints and the adoration of the sacrament.

The group's general secretary was W. St Clair Taylor, who described himself as a reverend, although he was not attached to any church. Taylor's nephew was Ian Paisley, a young preacher in Northern Ireland, who was later to become leader of the Democratic Unionist Party and First Minister of Northern Ireland.

The group organised protests in Anglican churches. In 1945, members sat in various locations during the confirmation of William Wand as Bishop of London, shouting out slogans at intervals to disrupt the service. The following year, they targeted a mass at St Cuthbert's, Earls Court, and Taylor invaded the pulpit to give a short speech before he was ejected. Later in the year, fifty supporters delayed the Bishop of Liverpool's mass at the Church of Saint John the Baptist, Liverpool for thirty minutes; he later stated that he had received anonymous threats not to attend the church.

The Church Times printed a strongly worded article complaining about the tactics of the National Union of Protestants. It claimed that the group had avoided protests in parishes "where there is a larger proportion of Christians engaged in heavy industries, who sometimes might not know their own physical strength", and noted that disrupting a clergyman celebrating a sacrament was punishable by up to two months in prison, or a fine of up to £5. However, it stated that Christians should "turn the other cheek" to the protesters.

== Northern Ireland ==
In 1946, the group launched a branch in Belfast, with Paisley as its "Irish representative". It organised a memorial to Ulster Unionist Party politician James Little. At its launch event on Belfast High Street, organising secretary Matthew Arnold Perkins stated that it would be active across Northern Ireland, and that it would examine the practice of the Church of Ireland to see whether there was evidence of the practices to which it objected. It undertook various protests, including one in 1948 against the Belfast Museum and Art Gallery opening on Sundays.

In 1948, Norman Porter became the secretary of the group, while Paisley continued as treasurer. However, Porter refused to join Paisley's Free Presbyterian Church of Ulster, and wished for the group to remain non-denominational, so Paisley left in about 1950. The group in Ireland disintegrated soon afterwards, with Porter instead becoming director of the Evangelical Protestant Society, although Paisley and Porter continued to collaborate on individual campaigns.

== Later activities ==
By the 1950s, Perkins had become the director of the group, and in 1957 he campaigned against the BBC broadcasting a Catholic mass. In 1966, he organised a protest at Westminster Abbey, attended by Paisley and John Wylie, against the Jesuit Thomas Corbishley being permitted to speak during a service.
