= Douglas McIldoon =

Douglas Bowman McIldoon (born 13 September 1945) is a former political activist and civil servant in Northern Ireland.

Born in Belfast, McIldoon studied at Methodist College Belfast, Queen's College, Oxford and the London School of Economics. From 1967 to 1969, he undertook research at the Oxford Centre for Management Studies. An activist in the Northern Ireland Labour Party (NILP), he was appointed Party Secretary in 1969, and held the post through the 1970s.

As the NILP lost members, McIldoon focused on his career at the Department of the Environment. For three years from 1990, he was seconded to the European Commission. In 1995, he was appointed head of The Utility Regulator in Northern Ireland, a role in which he adopted a high profile and was credited by the Belfast Telegraph with achieving lower prices for electricity users. He retired in the 2000s, but was commissioned to produce a report on Northern Irish energy prices in 2008.

When the British Labour Party began admitting members in Northern Ireland, Holmes joined. However, the party refused to stand any candidates in the region, and in 2016 McIldoon was part of a group which founded the Northern Ireland Labour Representation Committee, a parallel group with the primary purpose of contesting elections, becoming its treasurer.

Party political offices
Preceded by Sam Napier	Party Secretary of the Northern Ireland Labour Party; 1969–1979	Succeeded by Ciaran McAteer
