= Belfast Protestant Association =

Populist evangelical political movement in the early 20th-century

The Belfast Protestant Association was a populist evangelical political movement in the early 20th-century.

The Association was founded in the last years of the 19th century by Arthur Trew, a former shipyard worker, who had become an evangelical Protestant preacher and made fiercely anti-Catholic speeches on the steps of Belfast Customs House.

In 1901, Trew was sentenced to twelve months' hard labour after he incited his supporters to riot in opposition to a Roman Catholic Corpus Christi procession in the city. His supporters regarded him as a martyr, and his speeches were taken over by Thomas Sloan. Sloan was a superior speaker and organiser, and interest increased rapidly. He stood as an independent Unionist in the 1902 Belfast South by-election, and was elected to the British House of Commons against the official unionist.

In 1903, Sloan founded the Independent Orange Order, but he joined the Irish Unionist Party and disassociated himself from his former supporters. However, the Association continued, and worked hard in Belfast North to ensure that the official unionist Daniel Dixon held his seat against a strong challenge from Labour Representation Committee candidate William Walker.

Soon after the 1906 general election, the Association's treasurer, a Mr Galbraith, disappeared with all the funds, and the organisation collapsed.
