= Congregational Reformed Church =

- Classification: Protestant
- Moderator: William J. Malcolmson
- Associations: Evangelical Protestant Society
- Region: Northern Ireland

The Congregational Reformed Church is a small Congregational Protestant church based in east Belfast, Northern Ireland.

The church is led by Rev. Dr William J. Malcolmson, an activist in the Orange Order and Royal Black Institution who is also president of the Evangelical Protestant Society (EPS). Raymond Pulman, a former assistant minister of the church, was also involved with the EPS from 1997, serving for a time as its general secretary; he was a former secretary of ILOL6 a member lodge of the Independent Grand Orange Lodge but in 2001 abandoned Orangeism on theological grounds. Pulman was also a member of the Association of Fundamentalists Evangelising Catholics.

The subordinate standard followed by the church is the Savoy Declaration of Faith and Order, drawn up in 1658. It uses the King James Version of the Bible and worshippers sing psalms, hymns and paraphrases without musical accompaniment. The church is associated with the Sovereign Grace Mission and the Bible Institute.
