= Rafton Pounder =

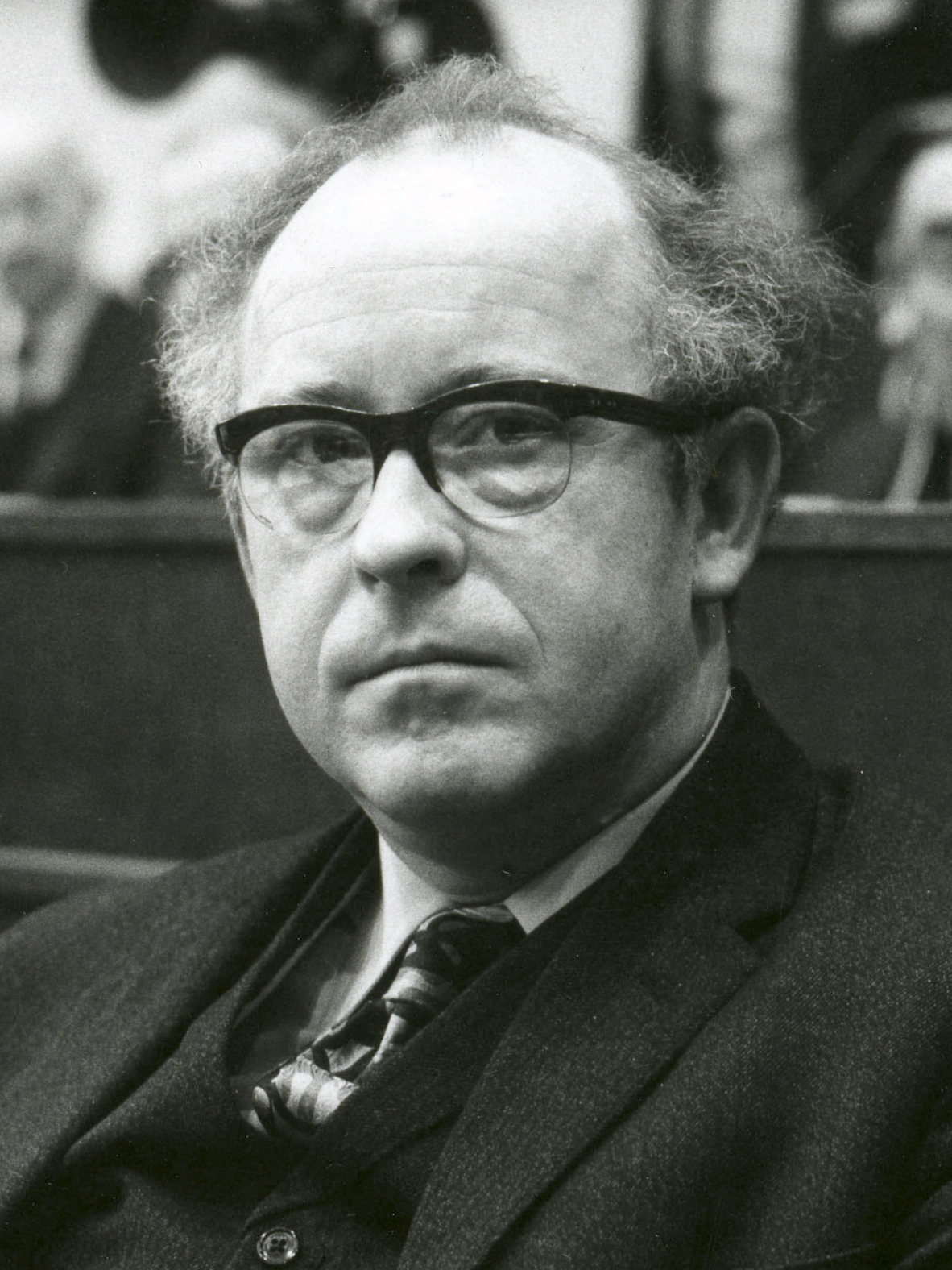
- Pounder in 1973

Member of Parliament for Belfast South
- In office 22 October 1963 – 8 February 1974
- Preceded by: David Campbell
- Succeeded by: Robert Bradford

Personal details
- Born: Rafton John Pounder; 13 May 1933 Belfast, Northern Ireland
- Died: 16 March 1991 (aged 57) Groomsport, Northern Ireland
- Party: Ulster Unionist
- Spouse: Valerie Isobel
- Children: 2
- Education: Christ's College, Cambridge

Rafton John Pounder (13 May 1933 — 16 April 1991) was a Pro-Assembly Unionist and Conservative Party Westminster MP from Northern Ireland.

Born at Ballynahatty, Shaw's Bridge, Belfast, the son of Cuthbert C. Pounder, Rafton Pounder was educated at Rockport School, Charterhouse and at Christ's College, Cambridge, where he was Chairman of the Conservative Association (CUCA).

He was elected Westminster Member of Parliament for Belfast South in a 1963 by-election, and served until February 1974 when he lost as a Pro-Assembly Unionist to the Reverend Robert Bradford of the United Ulster Unionist Coalition. Pounder was also a Member of the European Parliament from 1973 to 1974. From 1964 to 1967, he served as Secretary of the Ulster Unionist Parliamentary Party.

Married to Valerie Isobel (daughter of Robert Stewart MBE), with one son, Aidan, and one daughter, Helen, he lived at Groomsport, County Down, until his death at age 57. He is outlived by his granddaughters, Charlotte, Kate, Iona and Penelope.

== Sources ==
- Leigh Rayment's Peerage Pages
- Times Guide to the House of Commons February 1974

Parliament of the United Kingdom
Preceded by David Campbell	Member of Parliament for Belfast South; 1963 – February 1974	Succeeded by Robert Bradford
