= April 1917 Belfast South by-election =

UK parliamentary by-election

The 1917 Belfast South by-election was held on 9 April 1917. The by-election was held due to the incumbent Irish Unionist MP, James Chambers, becoming Solicitor-General for Ireland. Chambers was re-elected unopposed.

== Result ==
April 1917 Belfast South by-election
Party	Candidate	Votes	%	±%
Irish Unionist	James Chambers	Unopposed		
Registered electors				
Irish Unionist hold				
