= Robert Bradford (Northern Irish politician) =

British politician (1941–1981)

Member of Parliament for Belfast South
- In office 28 February 1974 – 14 November 1981
- Preceded by: Rafton Pounder
- Succeeded by: Martin Smyth

Personal details
- Born: Robert Jonathan Bradford; 8 June 1941 Limavady, Northern Ireland
- Died: 14 November 1981 (aged 40) Belfast, Northern Ireland
- Manner of death: Assassination (gunshot wounds)
- Party: Vanguard Progressive Unionist Party; Ulster Unionist Party
- Spouse: Norah Bradford
- Children: Claire Bradford
- Profession: Clergyman

Robert Jonathan Bradford (8 June 1941 – 14 November 1981) was a Methodist Minister and a Vanguard Unionist and Ulster Unionist Member of Parliament for the Belfast South constituency in Northern Ireland until his murder by the Provisional Irish Republican Army (IRA) on 14 November 1981.

== Early life and footballer ==
Robert Jonathan Bradford was born on 8 June 1941 to a Belfast family who were resident in Limavady, County Londonderry, due to the wartime evacuation. Bradford's father left the family not long after his birth and his mother died so he was raised by foster parents. A talented footballer, Bradford signed for Glenavon F.C. as a teenager and his displays soon attracted the attentions of the English side Sheffield Wednesday F.C., who invited him to a trial. However, Bradford was not signed by the club and returned to Northern Ireland to resume his career with the then Belfast-based club Distillery.

== Religion ==
Bradford gave up football in 1964, after deciding to train to become a Methodist minister. After spending the rest of the 1960s attached to congregations in East Belfast and Fivemiletown, Bradford was fully ordained in 1970 and given his own parish in the Suffolk area of southwest Belfast. Bradford later resigned from the Methodist ministry in the late 1970s after feeling that he and his fellow ministers were on divergent paths both politically and ecumenically. In October 1973 Bradford paid for a frontpage advertisement in the News Letter condemning dialogue with "Roman apostates". Several fellow Methodist ministers criticised Bradford, pointing out that the decision to engage in dialogue with the Catholic Church had been taken at the Methodist Conference in June following an open debate. At the annual conference of the Methodist church in Ireland in 1974 Bradford accused President Harold Sloan of "abuse and prostitution" after Sloan castigated politicians who threatened civil war, aroused passions, and used the Bible as justification for violence. Bradford resigned from the Methodist Church a month later, in July 1974. Bradford would spend the final years of his life without a church. During these years he came to spend time in the 'Bible Belt' of the US and became associated with American Evangelicalism. Nevertheless, Bradford claimed to always remain at heart a Methodist and also rejected suggestions that he was to join Ian Paisley's Free Presbyterian Church (which he never did).

== Political career ==
Bradford first became involved with unionism in 1971 when he joined the Orange Order. From here he became more involved in the political side of the movement and stood as a candidate for the Vanguard Progressive Unionist Party in the 1973 Northern Ireland Assembly election in South Antrim, although he was not elected. Bradford was first elected as Member of Parliament for South Belfast in the February 1974 British general election, this time under the banner of the United Ulster Unionist Council (an alliance between the Vanguard, the Democratic Unionist Party and the anti-Brian Faulkner section of the Ulster Unionist Party (UUP) under Harry West), defeating the sitting MP Rafton Pounder, a pro-Faulkner Ulster Unionist. Bradford was described in media following his election as a "hardline loyalist". His campaign had been openly supported by the far-right National Front, and at a National Front rally in September 1974, Martin Webster read out a letter of solidarity from Bradford. Bradford was opposed to power-sharing with the Social Democratic and Labour Party (SDLP) as set out in the Sunningdale Agreement, describing the proposal as "sheer madness".

Bradford greatly increased his majority in the October election, after Pounder dropped out, and largely maintained this increased majority in 1979. Between 1974 and 1978 he sat for the Vanguard Party until in February 1978 he joined the UUP (then often called the Official Unionist Party), along with Vanguard leader Bill Craig and most of the membership. He was re-elected in 1979 for the UUP.

In January 1980 Bradford called for IRA members captured by British security forces to be summarily executed as "saboteurs and spies".

He was described as a religious and political hardliner, identifying with British Israelism. In one of his speeches he said the causes of the problems in Northern Ireland were down to the Roman Catholic Church, Marxism, and ecumenical confusion.

== Death ==
Bradford was gunned down by three IRA members, one of them carrying a submachine gun, on 14 November 1981. He was hosting a political surgery in a community centre in Finaghy, Belfast. Kenneth Campbell, the 29-year-old Protestant caretaker in the centre, was killed at the front door by the first outburst of gunfire. An RUC bodyguard was then held at gunpoint, while Bradford was shot several times. As the IRA unit got away, the RUC constable fired three shots at the car they were riding in.

Secretary of State Jim Prior was verbally abused and jostled by a group of angry loyalists outside the church at his funeral and hissed at by members of the congregation. Ian Paisley also protested against his attendance.

Taoiseach Garret FitzGerald made an expression of sympathy in the Irish parliament Dáil Éireann, stating:

I would like to refer to the brutal murder, by the Provisional IRA, of the Reverend Robert Bradford, MP in Belfast on Saturday last. His death and that of Mr. Ken Campbell, caretaker at the Finaghy Community Centre, are part of a calculated series of atrocities committed in recent days. I know that all the people we represent share the sense of sorrow, anger and outrage widely felt in Northern Ireland at present. The killing of an elected representative of the people calls for particular condemnation in the strongest possible terms and serves to remind us of the real objectives of the organisation responsible. The IRA has once again shown its utter contempt for human life and for the democratic process which it has recently sought to distort for its own ends. Its true attitude to democracy and freedom was summed up in a recent statement of an IRA spokesman who, when asked by an interviewer for a foreign newspaper about the wishes of the people in this part of the country concerning an aspect of reunification, replied, "We call the shots. We don't really give a damn what they want".

The IRA described him as "one of the key people responsible for winding up the loyalist paramilitary sectarian machine", a "propagator of anti-Catholic sectarian hatred", and "a prominent motivator of attacks on Catholics". A number of Catholics were killed by loyalists in retaliation. Years later, it was revealed that the security services had been warned three days before Bradford's death about the IRA plot to assassinate him, but did nothing to prevent it, leading to the claim that they were protecting the life of informers within the IRA.

His seat was won by Martin Smyth, also of the UUP, in a by-election in 1982.

Parliament of the United Kingdom
Preceded by Rafton Pounder	Member of Parliament for Belfast South; 1974–1981	Succeeded by Martin Smyth
