= William Howard Campbell =

Irish missionary (1859–1910)

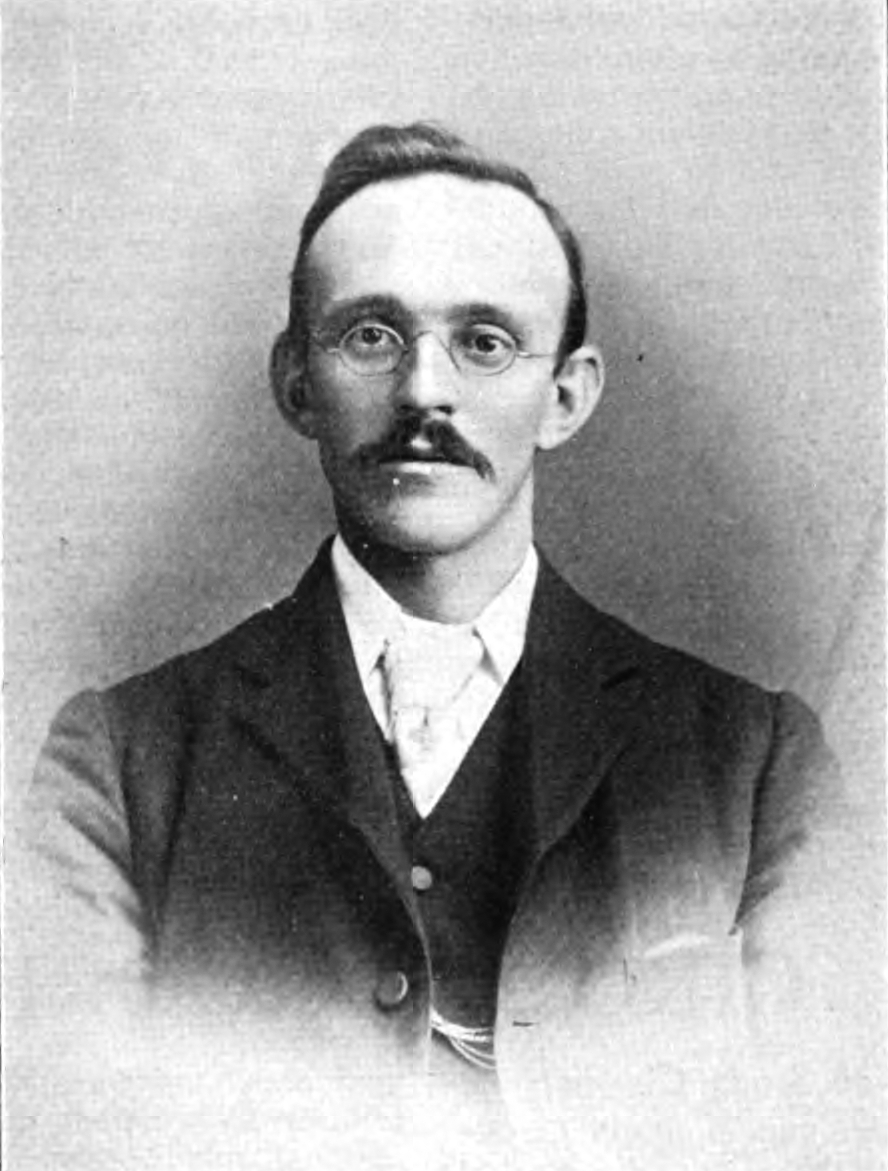
Portrait

William Howard Campbell (20 September 1859 - 18 February 1910) was an Irish Presbyterian missionary who worked with the London Missionary Society in southern India. He worked in Jammalamadugu in Cudappah District. He was also a naturalist with a keen interest in birds and moths. The Campbell Memorial School founded in Jammalamadugu in 1913 was named in his memory. The Northern Ireland MP, Sir David Callender Campbell was one of his sons.

== Biography ==
Son of businessman Thomas Callender Campbell, Howard was born in Derry, the oldest of nine siblings, and took an interest in the local moths and butterflies from an early age. His brothers David Callender and Thomas Vincent were also keen naturalists. One of his brothers, Sidney George become a fellow of Christ's College, Cambridge. Their family "museum" of specimens was said to have been one of the best in the region. He studied at the Academical Institution in Derry and received an MA from the University of Edinburgh in 1880 and a BD in 1882. He studied Sanskrit at Edinburgh for two years. He was a champion rugby player at Edinburgh University and in one match earned a win with a maul-in-goal, with three Portadown players holding him down. A Foyle College magazine had a picture of him under the heading "The Bringing of the First Football Cup to Derry." He joined the London Missionary Society and went to Cuddapah in India in 1884. He lived in Jammalamadugu from 1895. He learnt the Telugu language and wrote several religious tracts. He played tennis and cricket in India, organizing village matches and rallying people for various causes including, on one occasion to fix a reservoir on the verge of breaching. In 1901 he moved to Gooty to work at the LMS training institution. He returned to England in 1903 due to ill health. In 1909 he was appointed head of the United Theological College at Bangalore but he did not take it up due to an illness which was diagnosed as sprue. He moved to Switzerland and the Italian Riviera to convalesce but died at Bordighera where he was buried.

== Contribution to science and literature ==
Campbell was a member of the Bombay Natural History Society who collected specimens, mostly of moths, and made natural history observations during his travels between 1901 and 1908. These included notes on a nesting colony of spot-billed pelicans near Buchupalle. He also collected insect specimens mainly from southern India, some of which he sent to Walter Rothschild and are now held in the Natural History Museum, London. Among his moth collections held at Gooty, there were nearly 60 that were new to science. Most of the species were described by George Hampson. Some of the species described (but may not currently be considered valid) from his collections include Phthonoloba auxostira, and Abraxas prosthetocneca, Homoptera ruficolora, Bleptina heteropalpia, Rhynchina leucogonia, Hypena mesogramma, H. molybdota, Mecistoptera albisigna, Cidaria nyctichroa, Chilo araealis, Phycita umbratalis, Stemmatophora aedalis (now considered a synonym of Hypsopygia fuscalis), Oligostigma chrysozonalis, Nacoleia pachytornalis, Nacoleia megaspilalis, and Calamochrous bipunctalis. He was also an expert on the flora, and recorded the host plants of many moth caterpillars. He was among the few who had observed the rare Jerdon's courser.

He called himself a socialist, sympathized with the problems of the local people and wrote a critique of colonial government in The Truth about the Government of India (1909) published by the East India Association. He wrote about the famine of 1897 in the Madras Mail, which helped direct relief work. Campbell also acted as examiner at the University of Madras for philosophy. He wrote several Telugu books including (translated titles) Grounds for Belief in a Personal God (1893), Christian Evidences (1898), Christian Theology (1905) and along with Veerasalingam Pantalu helped revise Browne's Telugu-English Dictionary (1906) and Arden's Telugu Grammar (1908). His contribution to the dictionary included Telugu names for birds and trees that he and W.M. Thorburn had collated.

Campbell married Elizabeth Nevin, daughter of David Boyd at Madras on 7 December 1884 and they had four sons including David who was later knighted.

== Other sources ==
- Satyanandam, Y.S. (1939) Life of W. Howard Campbell, M.A., B.D. Proddutur: Privately printed. (in Telugu)
