= William Arthur Lindsay =

British politician

William Lindsay

Member of Parliament for Belfast South
- In office 2 July 1917 – 14 December 1918
- Preceded by: James Chambers
- Succeeded by: Constituency abolished Thomas Moles (1922)

Personal details
- Born: 14 April 1866
- Died: 21 June 1936 (aged 70)
- Party: Irish Unionist Alliance

William Arthur Lindsay (14 April 1866 – 21 June 1936) was a British politician and Irish Unionist.

Born in Belfast, Lindsay was educated at The Leys School, Cambridge, and Peterhouse, Cambridge. He was the Member of Parliament for Belfast South between 1917 until 1918 when the seat was abolished. He then served as MP for Belfast Cromac between 1918 and 1922, until the seat was abolished. He was the only MP to ever represent that constituency. He was a member of the Irish Unionist Party and from 1921 the Ulster Unionist Party.

Parliament of the United Kingdom
Preceded by James Chambers	Member of Parliament for Belfast South; 1917 – 1918	constituency abolished
New constituency	Member of Parliament for Belfast Cromac; 1918 – 1922	constituency abolished
