= July 1917 Belfast South by-election =

UK parliamentary by-election

The 1917 Belfast South by-election was held on 2 July 1917. The by-election was held due to the death of the incumbent Conservative MP, James Chambers. It was won by the Conservative candidate William Arthur Lindsay, who was elected unopposed.

== Result ==
July 1917 Belfast South by-election
| Party | Candidate | Votes | % | ±% |
|---|---|---|---|---|
| Irish Unionist | William Arthur Lindsay | Unopposed | | |
| Registered electors | | | | |
| Irish Unionist hold | | | | |
