= Belfast South (UK Parliament constituency) =

Parliamentary constituency in the United Kingdom, 1885–1918 and 1922–2024

- Former borough constituency for the House of Commons
- Boundary of Belfast South in Northern Ireland
- District: Belfast; Castlereagh
- Electorate: 60,914 (March 2011)
- Borough: Belfast

1922–2024
- Seats: 1
- Created from: Belfast Cromac; Belfast Ormeau
- Replaced by: Belfast South and Mid Down

1885–1918
- Seats: 1
- Type of constituency: Borough constituency
- Created from: Belfast
- Replaced by: Belfast Cromac; Belfast Ormeau

Belfast South was a parliamentary constituency in the United Kingdom House of Commons from 1885 to 1918 and from 1922 to 2024. From the 2024 general election, it was succeeded by the constituency of Belfast South and Mid Down.

Map of boundaries 2010–2024

== History ==
In the late nineteenth and early twentieth centuries, Belfast South tended to elect 'rebel unionists' such as William Johnston, who defied a ban on Orange marches, and Thomas Sloan, founder of the Independent Orange Order.

Belfast South contained some of Belfast's most expensive residential districts as well as Queen's University Belfast. The overall tenor of the constituency is middle-class – young, trendy and cosmopolitan towards the city centre, with Northern Ireland's biggest concentrations of both students and ethnic minorities, and further out from the city centre it is settled and prosperous. Despite this, significant pockets of inner-city working class areas such as the Markets and a number of isolated suburban estates exist in the constituency.

There had been particularly rapid demographic change in Belfast South from around the year 2000. The 2011 census revealed that Belfast South consisted of a slightly larger Catholic population than Protestant and while the constituency traditionally has had a unionist majority, the nationalist vote surpassed this in more recent elections. There have also been strong votes for other parties such as the Alliance Party of Northern Ireland, Green Party, the Conservatives and the Northern Ireland Women's Coalition. The constituency has witnessed a steady series of candidates backed by groups who aspire to support the British Labour Party despite its prior ban on membership and organisation in Northern Ireland, though their results have been minimal. Until the 1990s the main focus of attention had been on contests between unionist candidates.

In the February 1974 general election the seat was won by Robert Bradford of the Vanguard Unionist Progressive Party on a united anti-Sunningdale Agreement slate with the Ulster Unionist Party and the Democratic Unionist Party. He defeated Rafton Pounder, the sitting Unionist MP who defended his seat as a Pro-Assembly Unionist. Bradford held the seat for the next seven years, though in February 1978 he and the rump of Vanguard reunited with the Ulster Unionists. At the end of 1981 Bradford was assassinated by the IRA in a Belfast community centre while hosting a political surgery.

The subsequent by-election garnered much interest as it was expected that the Democratic Unionist Party would take the seat, building on their steady rise which had seen them gain both Belfast North and Belfast East at the previous general election. However, the DUP came third, behind the Alliance Party of Northern Ireland, and the UUP's candidate Martin Smyth won the seat, holding it until 2005. The by-election was extremely significant at the time in that it was the first at which the DUP tide ebbed.

In January 2005 Smyth announced that he would retire at the 2005 general election, raising speculation both as to whom the Ulster Unionists would field in succession to him and what effect a different candidate would have upon their share of the vote. The UUP selected Assembly member Michael McGimpsey, albeit with a highly controversial and bitter selection. McGimpsey was repudiated by many prominent Unionists, including both Smyth and former UUP leader James Molyneaux. The DUP selected Jimmy Spratt and offered an electoral pact to the UUP that would give each party a free run at one out of South Belfast and Fermanagh and South Tyrone. This offer was rejected by the UUP.

In the event, the DUP and UUP both fielded candidates which split the vote. The nationalist vote mainly went for the SDLP over Sinn Féin, with the result that the SDLP took the seat despite a majority of votes cast for unionist candidates.

In the 2010 general election, Sinn Féin opted not to stand against the SDLP to avoid splitting the nationalist vote. The SDLP won the seat with a majority of 6,000. This was the seat in which the Alliance Party had their second-best showing, polling 15% of the votes. Alasdair McDonnell retained the seat in May 2015, with only 24.5% of the vote, as Sinn Féin opted to stand. This is the smallest proportion of the vote a winning candidate has ever achieved in a UK general election.

In the 2017 general election the seat was won by Emma Little-Pengelly of the DUP with Alasdair McDonnell losing his seat along with all other SDLP MPs in Northern Ireland. This was won back for the SDLP by Claire Hanna in 2019, with Sinn Féin again opting not to stand. This was the first time since 1987 that the winning candidate in the constituency had a majority of the vote.

== Boundaries ==
Under the Redistribution of Seats Act 1885, the parliamentary borough of Belfast was expanded. The 2-seat borough constituency of Belfast in the House of Commons of the United Kingdom was divided into four divisions: East, South, West, and North.

The city boundaries were expanded under the Belfast Corporation Act 1896. Under the Redistribution of Seats (Ireland) Act 1918, the parliamentary borough was extended to include the whole city and the number of divisions increased from 4 to 9. The Cromac and Ormeau divisions largely replaced the South division. These boundaries were in effect at the 1918 general election.

The Government of Ireland Act 1920 established the Parliament of Northern Ireland, which came into operation in 1921. The representation of Northern Ireland in the Parliament of the United Kingdom was reduced from 30 MPs to 13 MPs, taking effect at the 1922 United Kingdom general election. These changes saw a 4-seat Belfast South constituency in the House of Commons of Northern Ireland and Belfast South re-established as a one-seat constituency at Westminster.

1885–1918	Cromac Ward (except so much as is comprised in the East division), St. George's Ward (except so much as is comprised in West division), and in the parish of Shankill, County of Antrim, the Townland of Malone Lower, and so much of the Townland of Malone Upper as is included in the parliamentary borough.
1922–1950	The divisions of Cromac (Cromac and Windsor wards) and Ormeau (Ormeau ward)
1950–1974	In the county borough of Belfast, the wards of Cromac, Ormeau and Windsor.
1974–1983	In the county borough of Belfast, the wards of Cromac, Ormeau and Windsor; In the rural district of Lisburn, the electoral divisions of Ardmore, Dunmurry, Finaghy, and Upper Malone; and in the rural district of Hillsborough, the electoral divisions of Breda and Edenderry.
1983–1997	In Belfast, the wards of Ballynafeigh, Cromac, Donegall, Finaghy, Malone, Ormeau, Rosetta, St George's, Stranmillis, university, Upper Malone, Willowfield, and Windsor.
1997–2010	In Belfast, the wards of Ballynafeigh, Blackstaff, Botanic, Finaghy, Malone, Musgrave, Ravenhill, Rosetta, Shaftesbury, Stranmillis, Upper Malone, Windsor and Woodstock, and in Castlereagh, the wards of Beechill, Cairnshill, Galwally, Knockbracken, Minnowburn and Newtownbreda.
2010–2024	In Belfast, the wards of Ballynafeigh, Blackstaff, Botanic, Finaghy, Malone, Musgrave, Ravenhill, Rosetta, Shaftesbury, Stranmillis, Upper Malone, Windsor and Woodstock and in Castlereagh, the wards of Beechill, Cairnshill, Carryduff East, Carryduff West, Galwally, Hillfoot, Knockbracken, Minnowburn, Newtownbreda and Wynchurch.

Under the 2023 review of Westminster constituencies, the seat was proposed to be replaced by Belfast South and Mid Down. The redrawn constituency contained 90.8% of the population of the former Belfast South. This seat was first contested at the 2024 United Kingdom general election.

== Members of Parliament ==
The Member of Parliament for Belfast South at the time of its abolition was Claire Hanna of the Social Democratic and Labour Party, who defeated Emma Little-Pengelly of the Democratic Unionist Party in the 2019 general election.

Election	Member	Party
1885	William Johnston	Ind. Conservative
1886	William Johnston	Irish Conservative
1891	William Johnston	Irish Unionist
1902	Thomas Sloan	Ind. Unionist
1910	James Chambers	Irish Unionist
1917	William Arthur Lindsay	Irish Unionist
1918	constituency abolished	
1922	constituency recreated	
1922	Thomas Moles	UUP
1929	William Stewart	UUP
1938	William Stewart	Progressive Unionist
1945	Conolly Gage	UUP
1952	David Campbell	UUP
1963	Rafton Pounder	UUP
February 1974	Robert Bradford	Vanguard
1977	Robert Bradford	UUP
1982	Martin Smyth	UUP
2003	Martin Smyth	Ind. Unionist
2004	Martin Smyth	UUP
2005	Alasdair McDonnell	SDLP
2017	Emma Little-Pengelly	DUP
2019	Claire Hanna	SDLP

== Election results ==
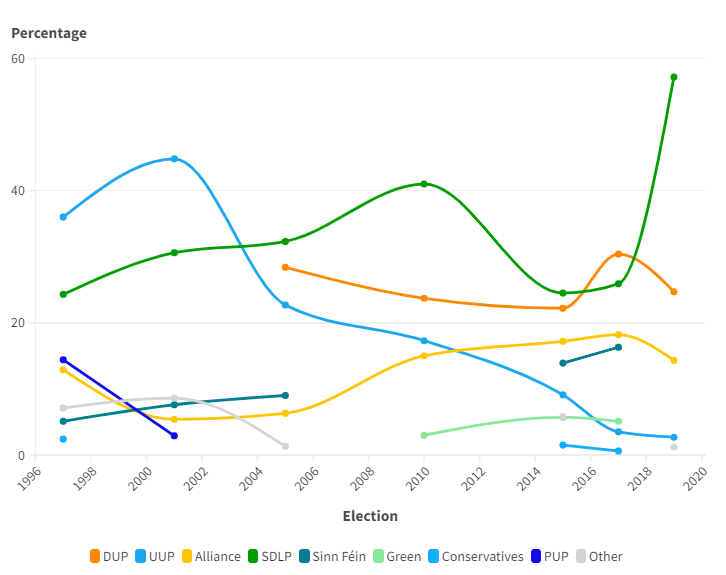

=== Elections in the 2010s ===
2019 general election: Belfast South
Party	Candidate	Votes	%	±%
SDLP	Claire Hanna	27,079	57.2	+31.3
DUP	Emma Little-Pengelly	11,678	24.7	−5.7
Alliance	Paula Bradshaw	6,786	14.3	−3.9
UUP	Michael Henderson	1,259	2.7	−0.8
Aontú	Chris McHugh	550	1.2	New
Majority		15,401	32.5	N/A
Turnout		47,352	67.6	+1.5
Registered electors		70,047		
SDLP gain from DUP		Swing	+18.5	

This seat saw the largest SDLP vote share and the largest increase in vote share for the party at the 2019 general election. This came as Sinn Féin did not contest the seat. It also saw the only fall in vote share for Alliance.

2017 general election: Belfast South
Party	Candidate	Votes	%	±%
DUP	Emma Little-Pengelly	13,299	30.4	+8.2
SDLP	Alasdair McDonnell	11,303	25.9	+1.4
Alliance	Paula Bradshaw	7,946	18.2	+1.0
Sinn Féin	Máirtín Ó Muilleoir	7,143	16.3	+2.4
Green (NI)	Clare Bailey	2,241	5.1	−0.6
UUP	Michael Henderson	1,527	3.5	−5.6
NI Conservatives	Clare Salier	246	0.6	−0.9
Majority		1,996	4.5	N/A
Turnout		43,699	66.1	+6.1
Registered electors		66,105		
DUP gain from SDLP		Swing	+3.5	

2015 general election: Belfast South
Party	Candidate	Votes	%	±%
SDLP	Alasdair McDonnell	9,560	24.5	−16.5
DUP	Jonathan Bell	8,654	22.2	−1.5
Alliance	Paula Bradshaw	6,711	17.2	+2.2
Sinn Féin	Máirtín Ó Muilleoir	5,402	13.9	New
UUP	Rodney McCune	3,549	9.1	−8.2
Green (NI)	Clare Bailey	2,238	5.7	+2.7
UKIP	Bob Stoker	1,900	4.9	New
NI Conservatives	Ben Manton	582	1.5	New
Workers' Party	Lily Kerr	361	0.9	New
Majority		906	2.3	−15.0
Turnout		38,957	60.0	+2.6
Registered electors		64,927		
SDLP hold		Swing	−7.5	

The SDLP won the lowest winning share of the vote in modern British history.

2010 general election: Belfast South
Party	Candidate	Votes	%	±%
SDLP	Alasdair McDonnell	14,026	41.0	+8.7
DUP	Jimmy Spratt	8,100	23.7	−5.9
UCU-NF	Paula Bradshaw	5,910	17.3	−4.9
Alliance	Anna Lo	5,114	15.0	+7.7
Green (NI)	Adam McGibbon	1,036	3.0	New
Majority		5,926	17.3	+13.4
Turnout		34,186	57.4	−5.1
Registered electors		59,524		
SDLP hold		Swing	+6.7	

=== Elections in the 2000s ===
2005 general election: Belfast South
Party	Candidate	Votes	%	±%
SDLP	Alasdair McDonnell	10,339	32.3	+1.7
DUP	Jimmy Spratt	9,104	28.4	New
UUP	Michael McGimpsey	7,263	22.7	−22.1
Sinn Féin	Alex Maskey	2,882	9.0	+1.4
Alliance	Geraldine Rice	2,012	6.3	+0.9
Rainbow Dream Ticket	Lynda Gilby	235	0.7	+0.4
Workers' Party	Paddy Lynn	193	0.6	+0.1
Majority		1,235	3.9	N/A
Turnout		32,028	60.8	−3.1
Registered electors		52,218		
SDLP gain from UUP		Swing	−13.4	

2001 general election: Belfast South
Party	Candidate	Votes	%	±%
UUP	Martin Smyth	17,008	44.8	+8.8
SDLP	Alasdair McDonnell	11,609	30.6	+6.3
NI Women's Coalition	Monica McWilliams	2,968	7.8	+4.8
Sinn Féin	Alex Maskey	2,894	7.6	+2.5
Alliance	Geraldine Rice	2,042	5.4	−7.5
PUP	Dawn Purvis	1,112	2.9	−11.5
Workers' Party	Paddy Lynn	204	0.5	−0.2
Rainbow Dream Ticket	Rainbow George Weiss	115	0.3	New
Majority		5,399	14.2	+2.5
Turnout		37,952	63.9	+1.7
Registered electors		59,436		
UUP hold		Swing	+1.3	

=== Elections in the 1990s ===
1997 general election: Belfast South
Party	Candidate	Votes	%	±%
UUP	Martin Smyth	14,201	36.0	−18.7
SDLP	Alasdair McDonnell	9,601	24.3	+10.1
PUP	David Ervine	5,687	14.4	New
Alliance	Steve McBride	5,112	12.9	−2.8
Sinn Féin	Seán Hayes	2,019	5.1	+2.6
NI Women's Coalition	Annie Campbell	1,204	3.0	New
NI Conservatives	Myrtle Boal	962	2.4	−9.3
Independent Labour	Niall Cusack	292	0.7	New
Workers' Party	Paddy Lynn	286	0.7	New
Natural Law	James Anderson	120	0.3	New
Majority		4,600	11.7	−19.3
Turnout		39,484	62.2	−2.3
Registered electors		63,633		
UUP hold		Swing	−13.4	

1997 Changes are compared to the 1992 notional results shown below.

Notional 1992 UK general election result : Belfast South
Party	Candidate	Votes	%	±%
UUP	N/A	23,258	52.7	N/A
Alliance	N/A	6,921	15.7	N/A
SDLP	N/A	6,266	14.2	N/A
NI Conservatives	N/A	5,154	11.7	N/A
Others	N/A	1,437	3.3	N/A
Sinn Féin	N/A	1,116	2.5	N/A
Majority		16,337	37.0	N/A

1992 general election: Belfast South
Party	Candidate	Votes	%	±%
UUP	Martin Smyth	16,336	48.6	−9.2
SDLP	Alasdair McDonnell	6,266	18.7	+5.6
Alliance	John Montgomery	5,054	15.0	−6.3
NI Conservatives	Andrew Fee	3,356	10.0	New
Sinn Féin	Seán Hayes	1,123	3.3	+0.1
Labour and Trade Union	Peter Hadden	875	2.6	New
Workers' Party	Paddy Lynn	362	1.1	−3.6
Natural Law	Teresa Mullen	212	0.6	New
Majority		10,070	29.9	−6.6
Turnout		33,584	64.5	+4.2
Registered electors		52,050		
UUP hold		Swing		

=== Elections in the 1980s ===
1987 general election: Belfast South
Party	Candidate	Votes	%	±%
UUP	Martin Smyth	18,917	57.8	+7.8
Alliance	David Cook	6,963	21.3	−2.6
SDLP	Alasdair McDonnell	4,268	13.1	+4.5
Workers' Party	Gerard Carr	1,528	4.7	+2.4
Sinn Féin	Seán McKnight	1,030	3.2	+0.2
Majority		11,954	36.5	+10.5
Turnout		32,706	60.3	−9.3
Registered electors		54,208		
UUP hold		Swing		

1986 Belfast South by-election
Party	Candidate	Votes	%	±%
UUP	Martin Smyth	21,771	71.3	+21.3
Alliance	David Cook	7,635	25.0	+1.1
Workers' Party	Gerry Carr	1,109	3.6	+1.3
Majority		14,136	46.3	+20.3
Turnout		30,515	56.9	−12.7
Registered electors		53,944		
UUP hold		Swing		

Note: The by-election was caused by the decision of all Unionist MPs to resign their seats and seek re-election on a platform of opposition to the Anglo-Irish Agreement.

1983 general election: Belfast South
Party	Candidate	Votes	%	±%
UUP	Martin Smyth	18,669	50.0	−11.7
Alliance	David Cook	8,945	23.9	−1.2
DUP	Raymond McCrea	4,565	12.2	N/A
SDLP	Alasdair McDonnell	3,216	8.6	−0.7
Sinn Féin	Sean McKnight	1,107	3.0	New
Workers' Party	Gerry Carr	856	2.3	New
Majority		9,724	26.0	−10.6
Turnout		37,358	69.6	+1.7
Registered electors		53,674		
UUP hold		Swing		

1982 Belfast South by-election
Party	Candidate	Votes	%	±%
UUP	Martin Smyth	17,123	39.3	−22.4
Alliance	David Cook	11,726	26.9	+1.8
DUP	William McCrea	9,818	22.6	New
SDLP	Alasdair McDonnell	3,839	8.8	+0.9
Ulster Loyalist Democratic Party	John McMichael	576	1.3	New
United Labour Party	Brian Caul	303	0.7	New
One Human Family	Jagat Narain	137	0.3	New
Peace State	Simon Hall-Raleigh	12	0.03	New
Majority		5,397	12.4	−24.2
Turnout		43,534	66.2	−1.7
Registered electors		66,219		
UUP hold		Swing		

=== Elections in the 1970s ===
1979 general election: Belfast South
Party	Candidate	Votes	%	±%
UUP	Robert Bradford	28,875	61.7	+2.5
Alliance	Basil Glass	11,745	25.1	+2.1
SDLP	Alasdair McDonnell	3,694	7.9	+3.2
Unionist Party NI	Victor Brennan	1,784	3.8	New
Labour Integrationist	Jeffrey Dudgeon	692	1.5	New
Majority		17,130	36.6	+0.4
Turnout		46,790	67.9	+0.2
Registered electors		68,920		
UUP hold		Swing		

October 1974 general election: Belfast South
Party	Candidate	Votes	%	±%
Vanguard	Robert Bradford	30,116	59.2	+16.6
Alliance	John Glass	11,715	23.0	+13.1
Ind. Unionist	Stanley McMaster	4,982	9.8	New
SDLP	Ben Caraher	2,390	4.7	−3.3
NI Labour	Erskine Holmes	1,643	3.2	−1.5
Majority		18,401	36.2	+28.5
Turnout		50,846	67.7	−1.9
Registered electors		75,112		
Vanguard hold		Swing		

February 1974 general election: Belfast South
Party	Candidate	Votes	%	±%
Vanguard	Robert Bradford	22,083	42.6	New
Pro-Assembly Unionist	Rafton Pounder	18,085	34.9	New
Alliance	David Cook	5,118	9.9	New
SDLP	Ben Caraher	4,149	8.0	New
NI Labour	Erskine Holmes	2,455	4.7	−24.9
Majority		3,998	7.7	N/A
Turnout		51,890	69.6	+1.2
Registered electors		75,443		
Vanguard gain from UUP		Swing		

1970 general election: Belfast South
Party	Candidate	Votes	%	±%
UUP	Rafton Pounder	27,523	70.4	+5.0
NI Labour	John Coulthard	11,567	29.6	−5.0
Majority		15,956	40.8	+10.0
Turnout		39,090	68.4	+5.1
Registered electors		57,112		
UUP hold		Swing	+5.0	

=== Elections in the 1960s ===
1966 general election: Belfast South
Party	Candidate	Votes	%	±%
UUP	Rafton Pounder	23,329	65.4	−4.4
NI Labour	Erskine Holmes	12,364	34.6	+12.2
Majority		10,965	30.8	−16.6
Turnout		35,693	63.3	−5.0
Registered electors		56,390		
UUP hold		Swing		

1964 general election: Belfast South
Party	Candidate	Votes	%	±%
UUP	Rafton Pounder	27,422	69.8	−0.1
NI Labour	John Barkley	8,792	22.4	+0.8
Ulster Liberal	Judith Rosenfield	1,941	4.9	−2.6
Ind. Republican	Robert McKnight	1,159	3.0	New
Majority		18,630	47.4	−0.9
Turnout		39,314	68.3	−3.8
Registered electors		57,558		
UUP hold		Swing		

1963 Belfast South by-election
Party	Candidate	Votes	%	±%
UUP	Rafton Pounder	17,989	64.3	−5.6
NI Labour	Norman Searight	7,209	25.8	+4.2
Ulster Liberal	Albert Hamilton	2,774	9.9	+2.4
Majority		10,780	38.5	−9.8
Turnout		27,972	48.3	−23.8
Registered electors		57,864		
UUP hold		Swing		

=== Elections in the 1950s ===
1959 general election: Belfast South
Party	Candidate	Votes	%	±%
UUP	David Campbell	30,164	69.9	−8.5
NI Labour	Norman Searight	9,318	21.6	+4.0
Ulster Liberal	Sheelagh Murnaghan	3,253	7.5	New
Sinn Féin	Brendan O'Reilly	434	1.0	−2.9
Majority		20,846	48.3	−12.5
Turnout		43,169	72.1	+6.4
Registered electors		59,864		
UUP hold		Swing		

1955 general election: Belfast South
Party	Candidate	Votes	%	±%
UUP	David Campbell	33,392	78.4	+2.6
NI Labour	Edward Brown	7,508	17.6	−3.6
Sinn Féin	Patrick Kearney	1,679	3.9	New
Majority		25,884	60.8	+9.2
Turnout		42,579	65.7	−8.1
Registered electors		64,844		
UUP hold		Swing		

1952 Belfast South by-election
Party	Candidate	Votes	%	±%
UUP	David Campbell	23,067	75.1	−0.7
NI Labour	Samuel Napier	7,655	24.9	+0.7
Majority		15,412	50.2	−1.4
Turnout		30,722	46.4	−27.4
Registered electors		65,196		
UUP hold		Swing		

1951 general election: Belfast South
Party	Candidate	Votes	%	±%
UUP	Conolly Gage	37,046	75.8	+0.6
NI Labour	Robert McBrinn	11,815	24.2	−0.6
Majority		25,231	51.6	+1.2
Turnout		48,861	73.8	+4.5
Registered electors		66,212		
UUP hold		Swing		

1950 general election: Belfast South
Party	Candidate	Votes	%	±%
UUP	Conolly Gage	34,620	75.2	+23.0
NI Labour	James McKernan	11,428	24.8	+7.3
Majority		23,192	50.4	+28.5
Turnout		46,048	69.3	+2.9
Registered electors		66,486		
UUP hold		Swing		

=== Elections in the 1940s ===
1945 general election: Belfast South
Party	Candidate	Votes	%	±%
UUP	Conolly Gage	24,282	52.2	N/A
Commonwealth Labour	Harry Midgley	14,096	30.3	New
NI Labour	James Morrow	8,166	17.5	New
Majority		10,186	21.9	N/A
Turnout		46,544	66.4	N/A
Registered electors		70,140		
UUP hold		Swing	N/A	

=== Elections in the 1930s ===
1935 general election: Belfast South
Party	Candidate	Votes	%	±%
UUP	William Stewart	Unopposed		
Registered electors		63,004		
UUP hold				

1931 general election: Belfast South
Party	Candidate	Votes	%	±%
UUP	William Stewart	Unopposed		
Registered electors		59,394		
UUP hold				

=== Elections in the 1920s ===
1929 general election: Belfast South
Party	Candidate	Votes	%	±%
UUP	William Stewart	24,019	62.9	N/A
Ind. Unionist	Philip James Woods	14,148	37.1	New
Majority		9,871	25.8	N/A
Turnout		38,167	64.7	N/A
Registered electors		59,025		
UUP hold		Swing	N/A	

1924 general election: Belfast South
Party	Candidate	Votes	%	±%
UUP	Thomas Moles	Unopposed		
Registered electors				
UUP hold				

1923 general election: Belfast South
Party	Candidate	Votes	%	±%
UUP	Thomas Moles	Unopposed		
Registered electors				
UUP hold				

1922 general election: Belfast South
Party	Candidate	Votes	%	±%
UUP	Thomas Moles	Unopposed		
Registered electors				
UUP win (new seat)				

=== Elections in the 1910s ===
July 1917 Belfast South by-election
Party	Candidate	Votes	%	±%
Irish Unionist	William Arthur Lindsay	Unopposed		
Registered electors				
Irish Unionist hold				

April 1917 Belfast South by-election
Party	Candidate	Votes	%	±%
Irish Unionist	James Chambers	Unopposed		
Registered electors				
Irish Unionist hold				

December 1910 general election: Belfast South
Party	Candidate	Votes	%	±%
Irish Unionist	James Chambers	5,585	67.2	+5.3
Ind. Unionist	Thomas Sloan	2,722	32.8	−5.3
Majority		2,863	34.4	+10.6
Turnout		8,307	78.2	−9.6
Registered electors		10,622		
Irish Unionist hold		Swing	+5.3	

January 1910 general election: Belfast South
Party	Candidate	Votes	%	±%
Irish Unionist	James Chambers	5,772	61.9	+16.9
Ind. Unionist	Thomas Sloan	3,553	38.1	−16.9
Majority		2,219	23.8	N/A
Turnout		9,325	87.8	+3.0
Registered electors		10,622		
Irish Unionist gain from Ind. Unionist		Swing	+16.9	

=== Elections in the 1900s ===
1906 general election: Belfast South
Party	Candidate	Votes	%	±%
Ind. Unionist	Thomas Sloan	4,450	55.0	N/A
Irish Unionist	Arthur Hill	3,634	45.0	N/A
Majority		816	10.0	N/A
Turnout		8,084	84.8	N/A
Registered electors		9,538		
Ind. Unionist hold		Swing	N/A	

1902 Belfast South by-election
Party	Candidate	Votes	%	±%
Ind. Unionist	Thomas Sloan	3,795	56.1	New
Irish Unionist	Charles William Dunbar Buller	2,969	43.9	N/A
Majority		826	12.2	N/A
Turnout		6,764	66.0	N/A
Registered electors		10,246		
Ind. Unionist gain from Irish Unionist		Swing	N/A	

1900 general election: Belfast South
Party	Candidate	Votes	%	±%
Irish Unionist	William Johnston	Unopposed		
Registered electors				
Irish Unionist hold				

=== Elections in the 1890s ===
1895 general election: Belfast South
Party	Candidate	Votes	%	±%
Irish Unionist	William Johnston	Unopposed		
Registered electors		8,192		
Irish Unionist hold				

1892 general election: Belfast South
Party	Candidate	Votes	%	±%
Irish Unionist	William Johnston	Unopposed		
Registered electors		7,563		
Irish Unionist hold				

=== Elections in the 1880s ===
1886 general election: Belfast South
Party	Candidate	Votes	%	±%
Irish Conservative	William Johnston	4,542	87.4	+21.4
Irish Parliamentary	Andrew McErlean	657	12.6	New
Majority		3,885	74.8	N/A
Turnout		5,199	77.1	−4.1
Registered electors		6,740		
Irish Conservative gain from Ind. Conservative		Swing		

1885 general election: Belfast South
Party	Candidate	Votes	%	±%
Ind. Conservative	William Johnston	3,610	66.0	
Liberal	John Workman	990	18.1	
Ind. Conservative	Robert Seeds	871	15.9	
Majority		2,620	47.9	
Turnout		5,471	81.2	
Registered electors		6,740		
Ind. Conservative win (new seat)				
