= David Callender Campbell (naturalist) =

Irish businessman and naturalist

- Born: 1860; Derry, Ireland
- Died: 1926 (aged 65–66); Derry

David Callender Campbell (1860 - 24 June 1926) was an Irish businessman and naturalist.

== Life ==
David Callender Campbell was born in 1860, near Derry. He was one of nine children of Thomas Callender Campbell. Two of his brothers also had an interest in natural history, Thomas Vincent and William Howard. He was a senior partner in the family business of flour importing, Campbell Bros. He was the uncle of the MP David Campbell.

Campbell's interest in natural history was wide, but he had a specific interest in butterflies and birds, recording numerous occurrences and observations in the Irish Naturalist from 1892 to 1923 as well as in other journals. He established a museum in Derry, but it closed after his death. Some specimens and objects were then donated to the Ulster Museum, including Campbell's marine algae collection. It is not recorded what happened to the collections held in the botanical collections of the museum.

Campbell died in Derry in 1926.
