= Samuel Napier (Northern Irish politician) =

Samuel Napier (died April 1984) was a Northern Irish politician.

== Biography ==
Napier studied at Queen's University Belfast. He joined the Northern Ireland Labour Party (NILP) in 1938, and was soon elected to Bangor Borough Council, serving for thirty years. In 1949, Party Secretary Joseph Corrigan resigned in protest, and Napier took his role on a temporary basis. He was confirmed in post in 1952 and given a full-time salary.

Napier first stood for the party in North Down at the 1949 Northern Ireland general election. He took only 12.6% of the vote, and was also unsuccessful at the 1952 Belfast South by-election to the Westminster parliament, taking 24.9% of the votes cast. At the 1953 Northern Ireland general election, he stood for the Queen's University Belfast seat, at which he took just 5.3%.

In 1965, the NILP was confident of securing an additional place in the Senate of Northern Ireland. Napier was lined up for the position, in order that the party could save the cost of his salary, but instead the post went to Norman Kennedy, and Napier resigned as Party Secretary. However, he was persuaded to return, and remained in post until 1969. He remained active in the party until 1977, and in 1982 called for the NILP to be wound up, as its membership and support had decreased dramatically.

Napier was known for wearing a bow tie for press appearances. In his personal life, following his retirement as party secretary, he wrote short stories.

Party political offices
Preceded by Joseph Corrigan	Party Secretary of the Northern Ireland Labour Party; 1949–1969	Succeeded by Douglas McIldoon
