= James Chambers (politician) =

Irish lawyer and Unionist politician (1863–1917)

James Chambers QC

Member of Parliament for Belfast South
- In office 10 January 1910 – 11 June 1917
- Preceded by: Thomas Sloan
- Succeeded by: William Arthur Lindsay

Solicitor-General for Ireland
- In office 1917–1917
- Monarch: George V
- Preceded by: James O'Connor
- Succeeded by: Arthur Samuels

Personal details
- Born: 1863 Darkley, Ireland
- Died: 11 June 1917 (aged 53–54)
- Party: Irish Unionist Party
- Education: Queen's College, Belfast; University of London; King's Inns
- Profession: Barrister

James Chambers QC (1863 – 11 June 1917) was an Irish lawyer and Unionist politician.

== Background and education ==
Chambers was the son of Mr. and Mrs. Joseph Chambers, of Darkley, County Armagh. Leaving Lurgan College, he proceeded to Queen's College, Belfast, where he studied Law, going on to the University of London to complete his studies.

== Legal and political career ==
Chambers was called to the Bar in 1885, serving in the North-East Circuit. In 1902 he took silk, and three years later was elected a bencher of King's Inns. He sat as Unionist Member of Parliament for South Belfast from 1910 to 1917 and was appointed Solicitor-General for Ireland in March 1917, in succession to James O'Connor, who became Attorney General. He retained this office until his death in June of the same year.

In addition to his legal career, Chambers was an ardent Unionist, viz. an excerpt from a speech he made on the Home Rule debate

As regards the future, what if a day should come when Ireland would be clamouring for independence complete and thorough from Great Britain? … What side would we take then? (A voice : 'Germany!' ) I bind no man to my opinions. We owe to England allegiance, loyalty, and gratitude; but if England cast us off, then I reserve the right, as a betrayed man, to say: 'I shall act as I have a right to act. I shall sing no longer "God Save the King" ' … I say here solemnly that the day England casts us off and despises our loyalty and allegiance, that day I will say: 'England, I will laugh at your calamity, I will mock when your fear cometh'. — James Chambers K.C., M.P., South Belfast, May 23, 1913.

He was one of the 10 signatories on the first page of the Ulster Covenant, as reported in the book Ulster's stand for Union:

When Carson had signed the Covenant he handed the silver pen to Londonderry, and the latter's name was followed in order by the signatures of the Moderator of the General Assembly, the Lord Bishop of Down, Connor, and Dromore (afterwards Primate of All Ireland), the Dean of Belfast (afterwards Bishop of Down), the General Secretary of the Presbyterian Church, the President of the Methodist Conference, the ex-Chairman of the Congregational Union, Viscount Castlereagh, and Mr. James Chambers, M.P. for South Belfast; and the rest of the company, including the Right Hon. Thomas Sinclair and the veteran Sir William Ewart, as well as the members of the Corporation and other public authorities and boards, having attached their signatures to other sheets, the general public waiting outside were then admitted.

Chambers died in June 1917. Maurice Healy in his memoir The Old Munster Circuit remembered him with affection as a handsome and good-humoured man, and probably the best barrister on the North-East Circuit.

Parliament of the United Kingdom
Preceded by Thomas Sloan	Member of Parliament for Belfast South; 1910 – 1917	Succeeded by William Arthur Lindsay
Legal offices
Preceded by James O'Connor	Solicitor-General for Ireland; March–June 1917	Succeeded by Arthur Samuels
