= Thomas Sloan =

Irish unionist

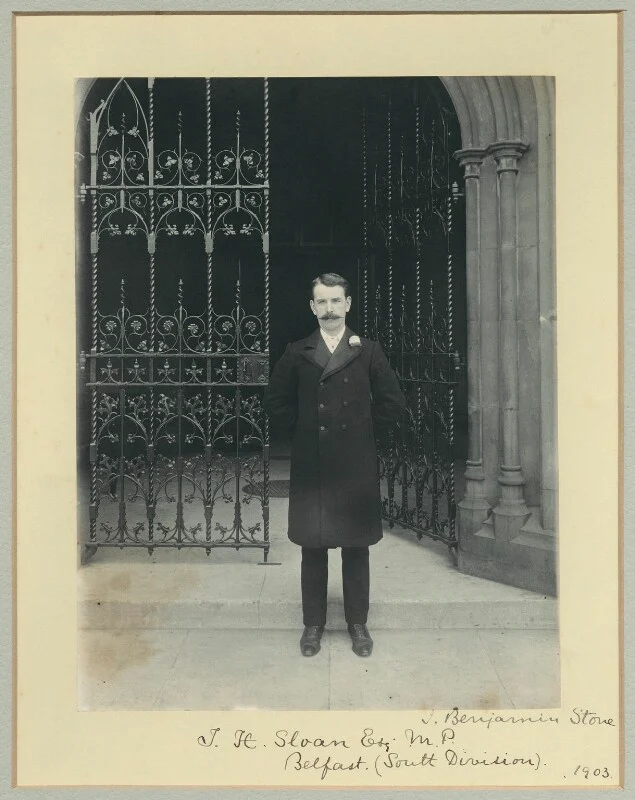

Member of Parliament for Belfast South
- In office 18 August 1902 – 10 January 1910
- Preceded by: William Johnston
- Succeeded by: James Chambers

Personal details
- Born: 1870
- Died: 1941 (aged 70–71)
- Party: Independent Unionist

Thomas Henry Sloan (1870–1941) was an Irish unionist and co-founder of the Independent Orange Order (IOO). The choice of a loyalist workers association over the official Conservative Unionist nominee, he represented the Belfast South constituency as an Independent Unionist at the Westminster parliament from 1902 to 1910. He and members of the IOO supported workers in the Belfast Lockout of 1907.

== Career ==
Sloan was a sub-contractor for the cementing of ship's floors at the shipyard of Harland & Wolff in Belfast. He first came to attention as a supporter of the working class evangelical Protestant preacher Arthur Trew, and soon became a leading member of his Belfast Protestant Association. In 1901, Trew was sentenced to twelve months' hard labour after he incited an anti-Catholic riot, and Sloan took over his Sunday afternoon speeches on the steps of Belfast Customs House. Trew's imprisonment had increased interest, and Sloan was a superior speaker and organiser.

In July 1902, the sitting MP for South Belfast, William Johnston, died. Johnston, an evangelical Orangeman, was first elected in 1868, defeating a millowner as the candidate of the United Protestant Working Men's Association of Ulster. While he later sat unopposed as an official Conservative, he established a reputation as a supporter of labour protection, tenant right, the secret ballot and woman's suffrage

In the tradition of Johnston, the Belfast Protestant Association challenged the Conservative Unionist nominee for South Belfast, presenting Sloan in the August 1902 by-election as the democratic candidate. His successful campaign was marked by what his opponents considered a classic piece of bigotry. Sloan protested the exemption of Catholic convents from inspection by the Hygiene Commission (the Catholic Church should not be "a state within a state"). But it was also as a trade unionist that Sloan criticised wealthy employers (the "fur-coat brigade") in the leadership of unionism.

In 1903, with Robert Lindsay Crawford, Sloan founded the Independent Orange Order. As Grand Master from 1905, Crawford sought to promote the Independent order as "strongly Protestant, strongly democratic" and "strongly Irish". In the Order's 1904 Magheramorne Manifesto, he invited Irish Protestants to "reconsider their position as Irish citizens and their attitude towards their Roman Catholic countrymen". While Sloan had signed the manifesto he, and the bulk of the membership, broke with Crawford as he moved progressively toward an embrace of Irish Home Rule. Crawford was expelled in 1908.

With the Independent Order, Sloan supported dock and linen-mill workers, led by the syndicalist James Larkin, in the great Belfast Lockout of 1907. In 1903 Sloan had been the only Unionist MP to vote for the Miners' Eight Hour bill.

Sloan was re-elected in the 1906 general election, but twice lost to the official Irish Unionist candidate in the January 1910 and December 1910 elections.

Parliament of the United Kingdom
Preceded by William Johnston	MP for Belfast South; 1902–1910	Succeeded by James Chambers
