= David Campbell (Belfast South MP) =

Northern Irish politician (1891–1963)

The Right Honourable Sir David Campbell KBE CMG MP

Member of Parliament for Belfast South
- In office 4 November 1952 – 12 June 1963
- Preceded by: Conolly Gage
- Succeeded by: Rafton Pounder

Personal details
- Born: 29 January 1891
- Died: 12 June 1963 (aged 72)
- Party: Ulster Unionist Party

Sir David Callender Campbell, KBE, CMG (29 January 1891 – 12 June 1963) was an Ulster Unionist politician in Northern Ireland.

Campbell was born in Cudappah, India where his father William Howard Campbell was a missionary working with the London Missionary Society. The third of four sons of whom the youngest, William, died of malaria on the way to England in 1894, David studied at Foyle College before going to Edinburgh University. David joined the colonial services in 1919 and served in Tanganyika and then served as deputy chief secretary in Uganda. He then became a secretary in Gibraltar and acting Lieutenant Governor of Malta. He returned and stood as the Member of Parliament (MP) for Belfast South in a 1952 by-election, and after election, served until his death in 1963. In 1959 while leader of the UUP Westminster MP's, he became involved in the row over Catholic membership of the UUP when he supported the idea in a letter to the party leader.

He served as Lieutenant-Governor of Malta, 1943–1952 and as a member of the Privy Council from 1962.

Parliament of the United Kingdom
Preceded by Conolly Gage	Member of Parliament for Belfast South; 1952–1963	Succeeded by Rafton Pounder
