= Independent Loyal Orange Institution =

Northtern Ireland Protestant fraternal group

- Founded: 1903; 123 years ago Belfast, Northern Ireland
- Type: Fraternal order
- Affiliation: Independent
- Status: Active
- Emphasis: Protestant Reformation
- Scope: National
- Colors: Blue and Orange
- Chapters: 44 (1907)
- Nickname: Independent Orange Order
- Headquarters: 10 Edward Street; Ballymoney, Northern Ireland BT53 6JE; United Kingdom
- Website: www.iloi.org

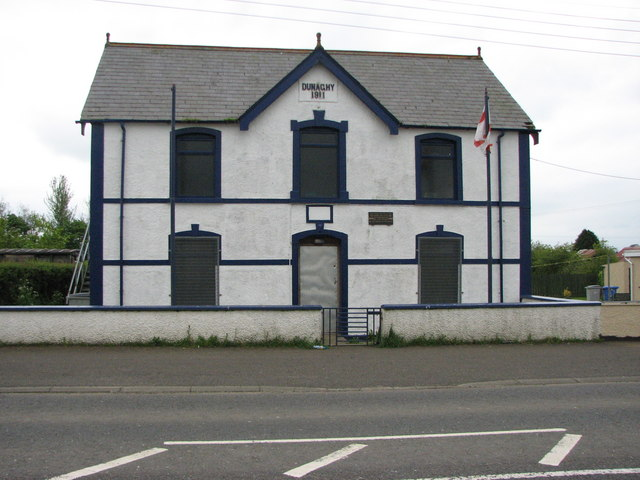
An Independent Orange Order Hall in Dunaghy, County Antrim.

The Independent Loyal Orange Institution is an offshoot of the Orange Institution, a Protestant fraternal organisation based in Northern Ireland. Initially pro-labour and supportive of tenant rights and land reform, over time it moved to a more conservative, unionist position.

== History ==
It was formed in Ireland in 1903 by Tom Sloan and others associated with the Belfast Protestant Association who had been expelled from the Orange Order when they voiced opposition to it being used for party political ends by Ulster Unionist Party. Originally it was associated with the labour movement, but it soon realigned itself with traditional unionist politics.

The class tensions within the Orange Order flared into rebellion in 1902. At an unruly Belfast County demonstration in Castlereagh, Thomas Sloan, Worshipful Master of the Belfast Protestant Association, challenged the County Grand Master, Colonel Saunderson MP, to say how he voted on the 'Inspection of Convent Laundries' bill. As the title suggests, this piece of legislation was an attempt to embarrass and annoy the Catholic Church by requiring that its convents (which militant Protestants suspected of exploiting the labour and the sexuality of young girls) be subject to government inspection. The point Sloan wished to make was that Saunderson, like most Unionist leaders, had put government interest before the anti-Catholic principle. Although popular enough to win the Belfast South Westminster seat previously held by William Johnston of Ballykilbeg (a Protestant hero since his prison sentence in 1867 for defying a parades ban) Sloan was disciplined by Grand Lodge for embarrassing a grandee and led a breakaway.

The organisation enjoyed steady growth, mainly confined to working-class Belfast and the liberal, pro-tenant right redoubt of north Antrim. By early 1904, it claimed nine lodges in Ballymoney alone. The organisation peaked at 44 lodges in 1907.

As Grand Master from 1905, Robert Lindsay Crawford sought to promote the Independent order as "strongly Protestant, strongly democratic" and "strongly Irish". In the Order's 1904 Magheramorne Manifesto, he invited Irish Protestants to "reconsider their position as Irish citizens and their attitude towards their Roman Catholic countrymen". Ultimately, Crawford's move toward an embrace for Irish Home Rule led to a break with Sloan and the Order's more determined unionist membership. He was expelled in 1908.

In the great Belfast Dock strike of 1907, the labour leader James Larkin was able to engage the support of Sloan and the independent Order. In 1903, Sloan had been the only Unionist MP to vote for the Miners' Eight-Hour Bill.

In 2024, the Independent Loyal Orange Institution national headquarters are in Ballymoney, Northern Ireland.

== Symbols and traditions ==
The Independent Loyal Orange Institution's name stems from the Orange Associations, a name that recognized the landing of William, Prince of Orange in England and the start of the Glorious Revoluation of 1688. Its colors are blue and orange. Orange represents the monarchs in the House of Orange. The society also has emblems and a system of passwords.

The Independent Orange Institution possesses three degrees – the Orange, Plain Purple, and the highly ritualistic Royal Arch Purple. The layout of the Independent Orange Institution degree system is outlined in the Independent Loyal Orange Institution 'candidate instruction' booklet which states: "There are three degrees in the Institution, the first being the Orange...Upon receipt of the Plain Purple degree a member is entitled to hold office in his Private Lodge and to attend the meetings of District. The Royal Arch Purple degree is the longest and most detailed degree. A member who receives this degree can attend County and Imperial Grand Lodge meetings."

This degree worked within the Independent Orange, is, in essence, the same as that employed by the Royal Arch Purple Chapter, although like any distinct organisation, it has some slight differences.

== Activities ==
Like the Orange Order, it is a Protestant fraternal organisation dedicated to the principles of the Protestant Reformation. It takes its name in memory of King William of Orange of the House of Orange who fought at the Battle of the Boyne, brought about the Glorious Revolution and the Bill of Rights giving the Westminster parliament ultimate power of the country rather than the Monarch. The Independent Order is small compared to the main organisation with about 350–400 members. It is largely based around north County Antrim in Northern Ireland but has lodges around the world, including England, Scotland and Australia. Its annual main Twelfth of July demonstration is held in a north Antrim town or village.

Along with the Orange Order and the Royal Black Institution, the Independent Orange Order in 2006 held talks with the Social Democratic and Labour Party, the Democratic Unionist Party (DUP), the Ulster Unionist Party, Alliance, the Chief Constable of the PSNI, the Secretary of State for Northern Ireland, the Presbyterian and Methodist Churches, the Church of Ireland and the Northern Ireland Human Rights Commission to try to resolve issues around contested loyalist parades. The Independent Orange Order was represented by Free Presbyterian minister David McConaghie, then a prominent figure in both the DUP and the Caleb Foundation, an evangelical pressure group. There was no meeting with Sinn Féin; McConaghie called on the IRA to apologise for the "slaughter" of 310 Orangemen who had been killed during the Troubles.

The annual Independent Orange Order demonstration on the Twelfth of July was in the past usually addressed by Ian Paisley, the leader of the Democratic Unionist Party, although he was not a member. In 2012, the demonstration held in Rasharkin, County Antrim, was led by McConaghie.

== See also ==
- List of general fraternities
