= 2024 Special Honours =

British list of honours

As part of the British honours system, Special Honours are issued at the Monarch's pleasure at any given time. The Special Honours refer to the awards made within royal prerogative, operational honours, political honours and other honours awarded outside the New Year Honours and Birthday Honours.

== Life peerage ==
=== Conservative Party ===
- Donald Cameron of Lochiel, to be Baron Cameron of Lochiel, of Achnacarry in the County of Inverness – 4 March 2024
- Charles Banner, KC, to be Baron Banner, of Barnt Green in the County of Worcestershire – 6 March 2024
- Franck Petitgas, to be Baron Petitgas, of Bosham in the County of West Sussex – 7 March 2024
- Peter Booth, to be Baron Booth, of Houghton-le-Spring in the City of Sunderland – 7 March 2024
- Cllr John Fuller, OBE, to be Baron Fuller, of Gorleston-on-Sea in the County of Norfolk – 8 March 2024
- Stuart Marks, CBE, to be Baron Marks of Hale, of Hale in the County of Greater Manchester – 8 March 2024
- Paul Goodman, to be Baron Goodman of Wycombe, of High Wycombe in the County of Buckinghamshire – 11 March 2024
- Cllr James Jamieson, OBE, to be Baron Jamieson, of Maulden in the County of Bedfordshire – 11 March 2024
- The Honourable Rosa Monckton, MBE, to be Baroness Monckton of Dallington Forest, of Earlsdown in the County of East Sussex. – 12 March 2024

=== Labour Party ===
- Gerald Shamash, to be Baron Shamash, of West Didsbury in the City of Manchester – 6 March 2024
- John Hannett, OBE, to be Baron Hannett of Everton, of Bramley-Moore Dock in the City of Liverpool – 12 March 2024
- Jane Ramsey, to be Baroness Ramsey of Wall Heath, of Dulwich in the London Borough of Southwark – 13 March 2024
- Ayesha Hazarika, MBE, to be Baroness Hazarika, of Coatbridge in the County of Lanarkshire – 14 March 2024
- Sir Patrick Vallance, KCB, FRS, to be Baron Vallance of Balham, of Balham in the London Borough of Wandsworth – 17 July 2024
- The Right Honourable Jacqui Smith, to be Baroness Smith of Malvern, of Malvern in the County of Worcestershire – 17 July 2024
- James Timpson, OBE, to be Baron Timpson, of Manley in the County of Cheshire – 18 July 2024
- The Right Honourable Richard Hermer, KC, to be Baron Hermer, of Penylan in the City of Cardiff – 18 July 2024
- The Right Honourable Sir David Hanson, to be Baron Hanson of Flint, of Flint in the County of Flintshire – 19 July 2024
- The Honourable Catherine Smith, to be Baroness Smith of Cluny, of Cluny in the City of Edinburgh – 9 October 2024
- Poppy Gustafsson, OBE, to be Baroness Gustafsson, of Chesterton in the City of Cambridge – 15 November 2024

=== Plaid Cymru ===
- Carmen Smith, to be Baroness Smith of Llanfaes, of Llanfaes in the County of Ynys Môn – 13 March 2024

=== Crossbench ===
- Dr Alexandra Freeman, to be Baroness Freeman of Steventon, of Abingdon in the County of Oxfordshire – 5 June 2024
- Professor Lionel Tarassenko, CBE, to be Baron Tarassenko, of Headington in the City of Oxford – 10 June 2024

== Lord Lieutenant ==
- Lindsay William Tulloch, QPM – to be Lord-Lieutenant of Shetland – 5 February 2024
- Dr Caroline Pryer – to be Lord-Lieutenant of Northumberland – 9 April 2024
- Dr Derrick Anderson, CBE – to be Lord-Lieutenant of West Midlands – 1 May 2024
- Michael Dooley, LVO – to be Lord-Lieutenant for Dorset – 23 August 2024
- Catherine Maxwell Stuart – to be Lord-Lieutenant for Tweeddale – 28 August 2024

== Privy Counsellor ==
- Michael Tomlinson KC, MP – 21 February 2024
- The Honourable Lord Armstrong KC – 10 April 2024
- The Honourable Lord Beckett KC – 10 April 2024
- Stephen Flynn MP – 10 April 2024
- Vaughan Gething MS – 10 April 2024
- Gavin Robinson MP – 10 April 2024
- Owen Thompson MP – 10 April 2024
- The Honourable Sir Peter Fraser KC – 22 May 2024
- Lucy Powell MP – 6 July 2024
- Shabana Mahmood MP – 6 July 2024
- Liz Kendall MP – 6 July 2024
- Lisa Nandy MP – 6 July 2024
- Louise Haigh MP – 10 July 2024
- Darren Jones MP – 10 July 2024
- Bridget Phillipson MP – 10 July 2024
- Steve Reed OBE, MP – 10 July 2024
- Jonathan Reynolds MP – 10 July 2024
- Wes Streeting MP – 10 July 2024
- Dr Anneliese Dodds MP – 10 July 2024
- Richard Hermer KC – 10 July 2024
- Dr Peter Kyle MP – 10 July 2024
- Ian Murray MP – 10 July 2024
- Jo Stevens MP – 10 July 2024
- John Swinney MSP – 10 July 2024
- The Right Honourable The Baroness Morgan of Ely MS – 28 August 2024
- The Honourable Dame Janice Pereira DBE – 28 August 2024
- The Honourable Sir Jeremy Baker KC – 6 November 2024
- The Honourable Sir David Holgate KC – 6 November 2024
- The Honourable Lord Clark KC – 6 November 2024
- The Honourable Sir Antony Zacaroli KC – 6 November 2024
- Heidi Alexander MP – 4 December 2024

== Most Noble Order of the Garter ==
Ribbon bar of the Order of the Garter

=== Stranger Knight Companion of the Order of the Garter (KG) ===
- His Majesty The Emperor of Japan – 25 June 2024

=== Royal Lady Companion of the Order of the Garter (LG) ===
- Her Royal Highness The Duchess of Gloucester, GCVO, DStJ, CD – 23 April 2024

=== Knight Companion of the Order of the Garter (KG) ===
- Air Chief Marshal the Right Honourable The Lord Peach, GBE, KCB, DL – 23 April 2024
- The Right Honourable The Lord Kakkar, KBE, PC – 23 April 2024
- The Right Honourable The Lord Lloyd-Webber – 23 April 2024

== Most Ancient and Most Noble Order of the Thistle ==
Order of the Thistle ribbon

=== Extra Knight of the Order of the Thistle (KT) ===
- His Royal Highness The Duke of Edinburgh, KG, GCVO, CD, ADC – 10 March 2024

=== Knight/Lady of the Order of the Thistle (KT/LT) ===
- The Right Honourable The Baroness Black of Strome, DBE, FRS, FRSE, FRAI, FRSB – 10 March 2024
- The Right Honourable The Baroness Kennedy of The Shaws, KC, FRSA, FRSE – 10 March 2024
- Sir Godfrey (Geoff) Palmer, OBE – 10 March 2024

== Most Honourable Order of the Bath ==
Ribbon bar of the Order of the Bath

=== Great Master and First / Principal Knight Grand Cross (GCB) ===
- His Royal Highness The Prince of Wales, KG, KT, PC, ADC – 23 April 2024

=== Knight Grand Cross of the Order of the Bath (GCB) ===
Honorary

- His Highness The Emir of Qatar – 3 December 2024

== Most Distinguished Order of St Michael and St George ==
Order of St Michael and St George ribbon

=== Knight Grand Cross of the Order of St Michael and St George (GCMG) ===
- His Excellency The Reverend David Tiva Kapu – On his appointment as Governor-General of Solomon Islands – 1 October 2024
- His Excellency Errol Charles – On his appointment as Governor-General of Saint Lucia – 1 November 2024

=== Companion of the Order of St Michael and St George (CMG) ===
Honorary

- Dr Kingsley Yeboah Amoako – Founder and President of the African Center for Economic Transformation. For services to UK economic and development policy in Africa.

== Royal Victorian Order ==
Royal Victorian Order ribbon

=== Knight Grand Cross of the Royal Victorian Order (GCVO) ===
- The Right Honourable The Lord Benyon, PC – upon appointment as Lord Chamberlain of the Household – 4 November 2024

Honorary

- His Majesty The King of Jordan, GCB, GCMG, KCVO – 11 November 2024
- His Majesty The King of Bahrain, KCMG – 11 November 2024

=== Knight Commander of the Royal Victorian Order (KCVO) ===
- The Right Reverend Dr John Geoffrey Inge – on relinquishment as Lord High Almoner – 13 November 2024

=== Commander of the Royal Victorian Order (CVO) ===
- Dr Timothy Hugh David Evans, LVO – lately Apothecary to Queen Elizabeth II, and Apothecary to the Royal Household – 20 March 2024
- John Lynes, LVO MBE – lately Private Secretary’s Office, Royal Household – 26 March 2024
- Major General Eldon Nicholas Somerville Millar, MBE – upon relinquishing his appointment as Defence Services Secretary – 26 September 2024
- Paul Anthony Lynden Singer, MVO – Official Secretary to the Governor-General of Australia – 22 October 2024
- Gareth Hoar – British High Commissioner to Samoa – 26 October 2024
- Dame Susan Margaret Bruce, DBE DL – on relinquishment of the appointment as Chair, Board of Trustees, The King's Foundation – 13 December 2024

=== Lieutenant of the Royal Victorian Order (LVO) ===
- Felicity Hugg – Director of Protocol, Department of the Prime Minister and Cabinet (Australia) – 22 October 2024
- Alastair James McGregor Warwick – on relinquishment of the appointment of Chief Executive Officer, Ascot Racecourse – 16 December 2024

=== Member of the Royal Victorian Order (MVO) ===
- Jeffrey Wadley – lately Property Supervisor at Llwynywermod House – 11 March 2024
- Josephine Wadley – lately Housekeeper at Llwynywermod House – 11 March 2024
- Captain Lakhbahadur Gurung, Royal Gurkha Rifles – on relinquishment of the role of The King’s Gurkha Orderly Officer – 9 July 2024
- Captain Vivek Jung Shah, MBE, The Queen’s Own Gurkha Logistic Regiment – on relinquishment of the role of The King’s Gurkha Orderly Officer – 9 July 2024
- Major Neil Patrick Cargill, The Royal Regiment of Scotland, lately Staff Officer, Headquarters 51 Brigade, Scotland – For services in Scotland on the Demise of Her Majesty Queen Elizabeth II, and to the Honours of Scotland Service in St. Giles Cathedral, Edinburgh – 10 October 2024
- Leanne Byrne – Director, Protocol, Community & Event, New South Wales Premier's Department – 22 October 2024
- Catherine Costanzo – Advisor, Department of the Prime Minister and Cabinet (Australia) – 22 October 2024
- Lee Dawe – Property Manager, Admiralty House – 22 October 2024
- Clare Magloire – Commonwealth Heads of Government Meeting (CHOGM), Visits Officer – 26 October 2024
- Moelagi Jackson – CHOGM, Operations Officer – 26 October 2024
- Elliot William Croasdale – Butchery Manager, Windsor Farm Shop – 19 November 2024
- Diane Lynne Kennedy – Operations Manager, Windsor Farm Shop – 19 November 2024
- Catherine Emma Robertson-Pugh – General Manager, Windsor Farm Shop – 19 November 2024
- Charlotte Lyn Wightman – Coffee Shop and Delicatessen Manager, Windsor Farm Shop – 19 November 2024
- Keven Dunger, RVM – on relinquishment of the appointment as Senior Stud Hand, Sandringham Stud – 25 November 2024
- Matthew John Powers, RVM, on relinquishment of the appointment as Head Coachman, Royal Mews – 16 December 2024

Honorary

- Slawomir Damian Zak – Retail Trading Supervisor, Windsor Farm Shop – 19 November 2024

== Royal Victorian Medal (RVM) ==
Royal Victorian Medal ribbon

Silver – Bar

- Stevan John Turnbull, RVM, Arboriculture Team Supervisor, Crown Estate, Windsor – 7 February 2024

Silver

- Gurmit Kaur Boparai – Coffee Shop Assistant, Windsor Farm Shop – 19 November 2024
- Jeanette Amelia Hogg – Senior Preparation Assistant, Windsor Farm Shop – 19 November 2024
- Janette Muriel Nicholson – Sales Assistant, Windsor Farm Shop – 19 November 2024

Honorary Silver medallist

- Brigid Mary Jones – Sales Assistant, Windsor Farm Shop – 19 November 2024

== Most Excellent Order of the British Empire ==
Ribbon bar of the Order of the British Empire (Civil)

Ribbon bar of the Order of the British Empire (Military)

=== Grand Master and First / Principal Dame Grand Cross (GBE) ===
- Her Majesty The Queen, LG, LT, ONZ, GCVO, CSM, CD, PC – 23 April 2024

=== Knight / Dame Commander of the Order of the British Empire (KBE / DBE) ===
Civil

- Harriett Baldwin MP – Member of Parliament (MP) for West Worcestershire. Formerly Minister of State for Africa and International Development. Currently Chair of the Treasury Select Committee. For Public and Parliamentary Service – 29 March 2024
- Tracey Crouch CBE, MP – Member of Parliament (MP) for Chatham and Aylesford. Formerly Minister for Sport, Civil Society and Loneliness. For Public and Parliamentary Service – 29 March 2024
- Emma Thomas – Film producer. For Services to Film – 29 March 2024
- Professor Philip Chase Bobbitt KBE – 11 June 2024 – Honorary appointed in 2021 to be made Substantive

Honorary

- Natarajan Chandrasekaran – Chairman, Tata Group. For services to UK/India Business relations.
- Dagmar Dolby – Co-founder, Ray and Dagmar Dolby Family Fund. For services to UK Higher Education and Philanthropy.
- Vladimir Jurowski – Former Principal Conductor and Conductor Emeritus, London Philharmonic Orchestra, Former Music Director, Glyndebourne Opera Festival and Principal Artist, Orchestra of the Age of Enlightenment. For services to Music and The Arts
- Wei Shen Lim – Chair, COVID-19 Immunisation, Joint Committee on Vaccination and Immunisation. For services to the COVID-19 Vaccination programme
- Sunil Bharti Mittal – Founder and Chairman, Bharti Enterprises. For services to UK and India Business relations
- Eric Schmidt – Former CEO and Chairman of Google. For services to Philanthropy
- Stephen A. Schwarzman – Chairman, Chief Executive Officer, and Co-Founder, Blackstone Inc. For services to Philanthropy

Military
Honorary

- General Mark Milley – Former Chair of the US Joint Chiefs of Staff. For services to UK/US Defence Relations

=== Commander of the Order of the British Empire (CBE) ===
Civil

- Matthew Clifford, MBE – Co-Founder of Entrepreneur First, Adviser to His Majesty’s Government on Artificial Intelligence and Chair of Advanced Research and Invention Agency. For Services to Artificial Intelligence – 29 March 2024
- Ian Hogarth – Chair of the Artificial Intelligence Safety Institute. For Services to Artificial Intelligence – 29 March 2024
- Gregory Campbell MP – Member of Parliament (MP) for East Londonderry, and the Democratic Unionist Party Spokesperson for International Development. For Public and Parliamentary Service – 29 March 2024

Honorary

- Volker Beckers – Non-Executive Director, Nuclear Decommissioning Authority. For services to Nuclear Energy.
- Tracy Blackwell – Chief Executive Officer, Pension Insurance Corporation. For services to the Insurance and Pensions Industry
- Hubertus Den Rooijen – Lately Managing Director, Marine, The Crown Estate. For services to Renewable Energy and to Marine Conservation.
- Lora E Fleming – Chair of Oceans, Epidemiology and Human Health, University of Exeter. For services to the Environment and Human Health
- Professor Jason Furman – Professor of Economics, Harvard University. For services to UK economic policy.
- Professor Edna Longley – Poetry critic. For services to Academia and the Arts
- Professor Andrea Nolan, OBE – Principal and Vice-Chancellor, Edinburgh Napier University. For services to Higher Education
- Shonda Rhimes – Screenwriter, Producer and Author. For services to UK/US relations
- Ted Sarandos – Co-Chief Executive Officer of Netflix. For services to Creative Industries
- Björn Savén – Chairman and Investor. For services to Philanthropy
- Wolfgang Tillmans – Photographer. For services to Photography
- Makoto Uchida – President and Chief Executive Officer, Nissan Motor Corporation. For services to UK/Japan business relations

Military

- Captain Alan Neil Lawrence Michael Nekrews, OBE QGM, Royal Navy – 31 December 2024
- Major General Ian Alexander Jonathan Turner, DSO – 31 December 2024

=== Officer of the Order of the British Empire (OBE) ===
Civil
Honorary

- Robert Chartener – Chairman and Investor. For services to Philanthropy
- Rino Donosepoetro – Chair, British Chambers of Commerce Indonesia and Vice Chair, UK-ASEAN Business Council. For services to UK/Indonesia and UK/ASEAN relations
- Daniel Glaser – Former Chief Executive Officer, Marsh McLennan, and Former Chair of BritishAmerican Business. For services to UK/US trade and investment.
- Francesco Giovannini – Co-founder, Green Arrow Capital. For services to Climate Change
- Dr Willem Jan Hoogsteder – Old Master Paintings Expert. For services to UK/Dutch bilateral relations.
- Yoshitaka Hori – Chairman, President and Chief Executive Officer, HoriPro. For services to UK Culture and Performing Arts in Japan
- Martina Hunt – Formerly Director, Commercial Models Team, Cabinet Office. For Public Service
- Professor Pontiano Kaleebu – Director, Uganda Virus Research Institute and Director, Medical Research Council/Uganda Virus Research and London School of Hygiene & Tropical Medicine Uganda Research Unit. For services to Education and Public Health.
- Kirill Karabits – Chief Conductor, Bournemouth Symphony Orchestra. For services to Music and promotion of symphonic works from Ukraine and Eastern Europe in the UK
- Catherine Le Yaouanc – General Manager, Franco-British Chamber of Commerce and Industry. For services to UK/France Trade.
- Yoshiko Mori – Chairperson of the Mori Art Museum, Japan. For services to UK-Japan culture and education.
- Rita Morrison-Keegan – Artist and Archivist. For services to Art.
- Robert Jones Portman – Former US Senator for Ohio. For services to UK/US relations.
- John Carroll Rees – Honorary Consul Punta Arenas. For services to British nationals in Chile.
- Jun Sawada – Chairman and Member of the Board, Nippon Telegraph and Telephone Corporation. For services to UK/Japan trade and investment and to UK/Japan relations

Military

- Commander George Houston Storton – 14 June 2024
- Lieutenant Colonel Haydn James Gaukroger, The Parachute Regiment – 14 June 2024
- Wing Commander Jeremy Peter Case, Royal Air Force – 1 November 2024
- Group Captain Simon Nevin, Royal Air Force – 31 December 2024

=== Member of the Order of the British Empire (MBE) ===
Civil

- Martine Clark MBE – 11 June 2024 – Honorary appointed in 2021 to be made Substantive
- Dr Muhammad Shafie Bin Kamaruddin MBE – 11 June 2024 – Honorary appointed in 2022 to be made Substantive
- Dr Maria João Rodrigues De Araujo – President, Portugal-UK 650. For services to UK/Portugal relations – 21 November 2024 – Honorary appointment from earlier in the year to be made Substantive

Honorary

- Frans Ammerlaan – WWII military commemoration volunteer. For services to Commemorations and British World War II Veterans
- Enas Al-Arashi – Defence Attaché Advisor, British Embassy Yemen. For services to British Foreign and Defence Policy
- Roger Beets – Chair, Airborne Commemoration Foundation. For services to Commemorations and to British WWII Veterans
- Anna Bubnova – British Council Head of Arts, Ukraine. For services to UK/Ukraine cultural relations
- Jolanta Buzeliene – Personal Assistant, British Embassy Vilnius. For services to British Nationals and the British Embassy in Lithuania
- Brigadier Rustom Darrah – Chairman, Commonwealth Ex-Services Trust. For services to Commonwealth Veterans living in Pakistan who served in the British Armed Forces
- Erroll Davis Jnr – Marshall Scholarship Selection Committee Member. For services to the UK/South-Eastern US relationship and to cultural diplomacy.
- Rajindar Dhatt – Founder Member, Undivided Indian Ex-Servicemen’s Association. For services to the South Asian Community in the UK
- Dr Rosana Felice – Former Medical Director, GlaxoSmithKline Argentina. For services to science diplomacy between the UK and Argentina
- Roberto Gattas Santis – Director Eleventh Fire Company, Valparaiso, Chile. For voluntary services to the British Fire Company in Valparaiso, Chile
- Phillimon Gonamombe – Operations Manager. For services to safety on the Falkland Islands
- Katsusada Hirose – Governor of Oita Prefecture. For services to UK-Japan Relations
- Gaurav Kapoor – Head of Investment Capital Team, British High Commission, New Delhi. For services to International Development in India
- Sarah Kronfol – Head of Security Programme, Conflict, Stability and Security Fund Lebanon, British Embassy Beirut. For services to UK interests in Lebanon
- Lynn Loacker – Founder and Managing Director, Project W. For services to Diversity in Business in the United States and the UK
- Karuna Onta – Social Development Advisor (Retired), British Embassy Kathmandu. For services to the UK and Nepal in tackling gender-based violence, discrimination and social exclusion in Nepal
- Karen Pilkington-Miksa – Founder New English Ballet Theatre. For services to DanceK
- Subash Rai – Retired Lance Corporal, British Gurkhas Nepal. For services to the UK Defence in Nepal
- Linda Frances Robertson – Head of Digital Customer Experience, Virgin Money. For services to Ukrainian refugees
- Astrid Schon – Head Teacher, London East Alternative Provision, London Borough of Tower Hamlets. For services to Education
- Barry Sweetbaum – Founder and Managing Director, SweetTree Home Care Services and SweetTree Farming For All. For services to Vulnerable People
- Captain (Retd) Shakeel Ur-Rehman – Senior Security Manager, British High Commission Islamabad. For services to UK-Pakistan relations
- Arjan Veurink – Assistant Coach, England Women’s National Football Team. For services to Association football
- Regula Ysewijn – Author and Food Critic. For services to British food and culture in Belgium and the UK.

Military

- Lieutenant Commander David Wayne Donbavand – 14 June 2024
- Warrant Officer Class 2 Osamah Omar Al-Khaldi, Corps of Royal Electrical and Mechanical Engineers – 14 June 2024
- Major Yugal Angbo, Corps of Royal Electrical and Mechanical Engineers – 14 June 2024
- Lance Corporal Charlotte Sophie Parry, Intelligence Corps – 14 June 2024
- Squadron Leader Graham James Orme – 14 June 2024
- Warrant Officer Class 2 (now Warrant Officer Class 1) Russell John Higgins, Army Air Corps – 1 November 2024

== British Empire Medal (BEM) ==
Ribbon bar of the British Empire Medal (Civil)

Honorary

- Junaid Ali – Philanthropist and Community Champion. For services to the community in East London during COVID-19
- Debbie Bulau – State-recognised Educator and Remembrance Project Leader. For services to the remembrance of British soldiers during World War II
- Bogumil Cwiklak – Area Operations Manager and High Dependency Support Unit Lead, The Orders of St John Care Trust. For services to social care during Covid-19
- Joseph Healy – Station Manager, Govia Thameslink Railway. For services to the Railway Industry
- Maria Petraitis-Williams – Enforcement Case Officer, Department for Work and Pensions. For services to Vulnerable Children and Young Adults
- Itsushi Tachi – Founding President, Japan Chevening Alumni Network. For services to people-to-people relations between the UK and Japan.
- Petr Vojtisek – Volunteer, CATCH (Community Action to Create Hope). For services to Young People in Leeds, West Yorkshire

== Order of the Companions of Honour ==
Order of the Companions of Honour ribbon

=== Royal Companion of the Order of the Companions of Honour (CH) ===
- Her Royal Highness The Princess of Wales, GCVO – 23 April 2024

== Knight Bachelor ==
Knight Bachelor ribbon

- Philip Davies MP – Member of Parliament (MP) for Shipley. For Public and Parliamentary Service – 29 March 2024
- Dr Demis Hassabis CBE, FRS, FREng, FRSA – CEO and Co-Founder of DeepMind. For Services to Artificial Intelligence – 29 March 2024
- Mohamed Mansour – Businessman, Philanthropist and Senior Treasurer of the Conservative Party. For Business, Charity and Political Service – 29 March 2024
- Christopher Nolan CBE – Filmmaker. For Services to Film – 29 March 2024
- Mark Spencer MP – Minister of State for Food, Farming and Fisheries and Member of Parliament (MP) for Sherwood. For Public and Parliamentary Service – 29 March 2024

== Air Force Cross (AFC) ==
Ribbon bar of the Air Force Cross

- Lieutenant Commander Andrew John Michael Carter, Royal Navy – 1 November 2024

== King's Gallantry Medal (KGM) ==
Ribbon bar of the King's Gallantry Medal

- PC Steven Denniss, Lincolnshire Police – For apprehending a double murder suspect while off-duty in Louth, Lincolnshire, on 1 June 2021 – 14 May 2024
- Lawrie Elsdon-Dew – For protecting others during a nine day siege during fierce fighting outside the Sudan Embassy, in April 2023 – 14 May 2024
- Stacey Farrington – For their actions stopping a speeding car from travelling the wrong way on a motorway, on 8 November 2021 – 14 May 2024
- Georgia Laurie – For saving her sister from a crocodile attack while on an excursion in Puerto Escondido, Mexico, on 6 June 2021 – 14 May 2024
- PC Rowland Printer – For confronting an armed assailant during a shooting in Plymouth, on 12 August 2021 – 14 May 2024
- Jake Walker – For their actions stopping a speeding car from travelling the wrong way on a motorway, on 8 November 2021 – 14 May 2024

== Imperial Service Medal (ISM) ==
Ribbon bar of the Imperial Service Medal

- Appointments 5 March 2024.
- Gery Mayzone Pratt, Skill Zone 2, Ministry of Defence – 14 May 2024
- Paul Keaney, Northern Ireland Department for Communities – 20 August 2024
- Appointments 24 September 2024.
- Appointments 12 November 2024.
- Appointments 17 December 2024.

== King's Commendation for Bravery ==
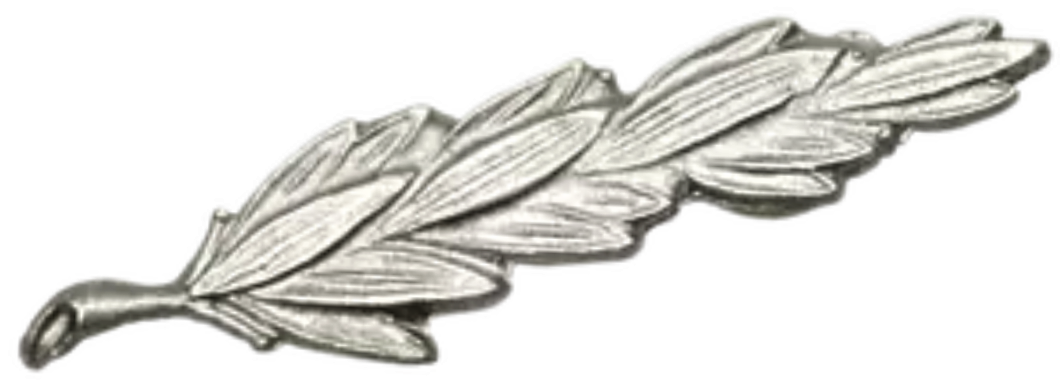
King's Commendation for Bravery

- Stephen Ellison – For rescuing a stranger from a river in Chongqing, China in November 2020 – 14 May 2024
- Chhaganlal Jagatia – For helping to rescue a number of people from a burning hotel in Mati, Greece, in July 2018 – 14 May 2024
- Paul Martin – For intervening in a knife attack on 14 April 2021 – 14 May 2024
- Trooper Lorcan Ignatius Valentine Noel Graydon, The Blues and Royals (Royal Horse Guards and 1st Dragoons) – 14 June 2024
- Acting Corporal Richard David Hayes, The Parachute Regiment – 14 June 2024
- Major Harry Alexander Robarts Wallace, Royal Regiment of Artillery – 14 June 2024

== King's Commendation for Valuable Service ==
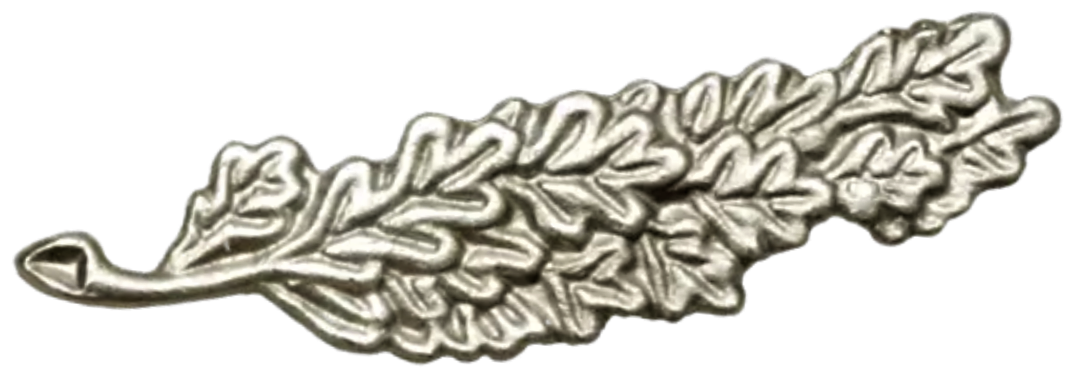
King's Commendation for Valuable Service

- Acting Brigadier Matthew Richard Baker, OBE – 14 June 2024
- Lieutenant Colonel Shane Stephen Burton, The Royal Gurkha Rifles – 14 June 2024
- Major David Alexander Edmondson, Army Air Corps – 14 June 2024
- Captain Barry Kieron Green, Royal Regiment of Artillery – 14 June 2024
- Major Ashley Michael Neve, The Parachute Regiment – 14 June 2024
- Lieutenant Colonel Thomas Anderson Forrest, The Royal Irish Regiment – 14 June 2024
- Squadron Leader Daniel Blenkinsop – 14 June 2024
- Sergeant James Casey – 14 June 2024

== Order of St John ==
Order of St John ribbon

=== Knight of the Order of St John (KStJ) ===
- Peter Richard Bradley, CBE – 7 February 2023
- Michael David Cook – 31 January 2024
- Alderman Professor Michael Raymond Mainelli – 31 January 2024
- The Most Reverend Sir David John Moxon, KNZM – 31 January 2024
- James George Naphambo – 31 January 2024
- Dr Norman Jan Piet Walker, OBE – 31 January 2024

=== Dame of the Order of St John (DStJ) ===
- Margaret Ann Houston – 31 January 2024
- Sonya Louise Marshall – 31 January 2024
- Kathryn Frances Colvin, CVO – 27 September 2024

=== Commander of the Order of St John (CStJ) ===
- Alexander Lindsay Fraser Bowman, MBE – 31 January 2024
- The Honourable Adam Robert Bruce – 31 January 2024
- Ian Crowe, MBE – 31 January 2024
- His Excellency Dr Richard Andrew Davies – 31 January 2024
- Mark Donald Dennis – 31 January 2024
- Jess Lawson Love Duncan – 31 January 2024
- Barbara Anne Everiss – 31 January 2024
- Arvind Michael Kapur, OBE – 31 January 2024
- Susan Jane Lousada – 31 January 2024
- Ewan Alexander Macdonald – 31 January 2024
- David Macleod Murdoch – 31 January 2024
- Ratu Vereniki Gordon Vula Raiwalui – 31 January 2024
- Elizabeth Ann Roads, LVO – 31 January 2024
- Johanna Louise Ropner – 31 January 2024
- Alison Ann Shepherd – 31 January 2024
- Kelvan Francis Smith – 31 January 2024
- Karen Susan Sunckell – 31 January 2024
- Derek John Watson – 31 January 2024
- Janice Helen Webster – 31 January 2024
- Michael George Arthur Will, MBE – 31 January 2024
- Marjorie Neasham Glasgow, BEM – 27 September 2024
- Bruce Rowan Grant – 27 September 2024
- Lieutenant Colonel James Peter Johnston, UD – 27 September 2024
- Innes John Mason – 27 September 2024
- Dr James Michael Moodie – 27 September 2024
- Alexis Jane, Lady Redmond, BEM – 27 September 2024
- Her Excellency Sandra, Lady Williams, wife of the Governor-General of Antigua and Barbuda – 27 September 2024

=== Officer of the Order of St John (OStJ) ===
- – appointments 31 January 2024
- – appointments 27 September 2024

=== Member of the Order of St John (MStJ) ===
- – appointments 31 January 2024
- – appointments 27 September 2024
