= Victoria Walusansa =

Ugandan physician and oncologist

- Born: 1972 (age 53–54); Central Region, Uganda
- Education: Makerere University (Bachelor of Medicine and Bachelor of Surgery) (Master of Medicine in Medicine); Fred Hutchinson Cancer Research Center (Fellowship in Medical Oncology)
- Occupations: Physician and oncologist
- Years active: 1999–present
- Spouse: Mark Abaliwano

Victoria Walusansa-Abaliwano (née Victoria Walusansa), is a Ugandan physician and oncologist, who works as the deputy director of the Uganda Cancer Institute (UCI), a cancer treatment and research institution, based in Kampala, Uganda and serving the countries of the African Great Lakes Region.

== Background and education ==
Walusansa was born in the Central Region of Uganda, circa 1972. In 1992, she was admitted to Makerere University School of Medicine, graduating in 1997 with a Bachelor of Medicine and Bachelor of Surgery (MBChB) degree. Four years later, she returned and enrolled in the postgraduate programme, graduating in 2004 with a Master of Medicine (MMed) degree in Internal Medicine. Later, for a period of 14 months, from July 2007 until August 2008, she trained as a post-doctoral oncology fellow, at the Fred Hutchinson Cancer Research Center, in Seattle, Washington, USA.

== Work experience ==
In 2004, after her MMed studies at Makerere, Walusansa reported to work at Uganda Cancer Institute, to work and study under the Director of the institute, Dr. Jackson Orem, who at the time, was the only trained specialist oncologist at UCI. Orem had just been appointed as executive director and was very busy, so she was on her own most of the time.

In 2007, an opportunity came up in the form of a full scholarship to train as an oncology fellow at the Fred Hutch Cancer Research Center in Washington state. She took the opportunity, supported by her family and her employer. She is the first Ugandan doctor to undergo the oncology fellowship training at Fred Hutch. As of August 2014, a total of 16 Ugandan oncologists had undergone the training.

As of November 2017, Walusansa is the deputy director and head of Clinical Services at UCI. She also worked as a lecturer in the Department of Medicine, at the adjacent Makerere University College of Health Sciences (MUCHS), until her resignation in May 2011.

On 25 May 2022, she was appointed a senior consultant medical oncologist by the Ugandan head of state, a title she holds concurrently with that of deputy executive director of Uganda Cancer Institute.

== Family ==
She is married to Mark Abaliwano, a dental surgeon, and together they are the parents of three daughters.
