= Katongole =

The surname Katongole may refer to:

- Edward Katongole-Mbidde, Ugandan physician and medical expert
- Emmanuel Katongole (businessman), Ugandan chairman of Quality Chemical Industries Limited
- Emmanuel Katongole (theologian), Ugandan Catholic priest and theologian
- Jolly Katongole (1985–2015), Ugandan boxer.
