= Máire Hendron =

Northern Irish politician

Member of the Northern Ireland Assembly for Belfast East
- In office 2 July 2019 – 9 January 2020
- Preceded by: Naomi Long
- Succeeded by: Naomi Long

34th Deputy Lord Mayor of Belfast
- In office 1 June 2014 – 1 June 2015
- Lord Mayor: Nichola Mallon
- Preceded by: Christopher Stalford
- Succeeded by: Guy Spence

Member of Belfast City Council
- In office 5 May 2005 – 22 May 2014
- Preceded by: Joseph O'Donnell
- Succeeded by: District abolished
- Constituency: Pottinger

Personal details
- Born: Belfast, Northern Ireland
- Party: Alliance
- Occupation: Politician

Máire Hendron is an Alliance Party politician who was a Member of the Northern Ireland Assembly (MLA) for Belfast East from 2019 to 2020.

She was a Belfast City Councillor for the Pottinger DEA from 2005 to 2014, and served as Deputy Lord Mayor of Belfast from 2014 to 2015.

== Political career ==
She was first elected to Belfast City Council in 2005, representing the Pottinger District.

Hendron was re-elected to the Council 2011, but failed to be elected onto the successor Titanic District at the 2014 local elections.

Hendron was appointed Deputy Lord Mayor of Belfast in 2014.

Hendron was co-opted to the Northern Ireland Assembly in July 2019 after the incumbent MLA, Naomi Long, was elected to the European Parliament . She resigned as an MLA in January 2020.
