= Gulu Regional Cancer Centre =

Hospital in the Northern Region of Uganda

Coordinates: 02°46′40″N 32°17′54″E

- Uganda Ministry of Health

Geography
- Location: Gulu, Northern Region, Uganda

Organisation
- Care system: Public
- Type: Cancer Treatment, Research and Teaching
- Affiliated university: Gulu University School of Medicine

History
- Founded: July 1, 2019; 6 years ago

Links
- Other links: List of hospitals in Uganda

Gulu Regional Cancer Centre (GRCC) is a public, specialized, tertiary care medical facility owned by the Uganda Ministry of Health, intended to provide care for cancer patients in the Northern Region of Uganda.

== Location ==
Initially, the facility is expected to be stationed within Gulu Regional Referral Hospital, who will be responsible for its daily operations.

Later, a permanent building to house the cancer centre is expected to be constructed outside of the referral hospital. Initially, the space formerly occupied by Gulu Central Police Station was proposed. However in 2017, when Gulu District failed to secure enough land to accommodate a stand-alone facility, the request for land was forwarded to Omoro District, to the south of Gulu District. Omoro District authorities allocated 4 acres (2 ha) at the Koro sub-county headquarters for the purpose of housing the cancer centre.

== Overview ==
GRCC is a cancer treatment, research, and teaching center, affiliated with the Gulu University School of Medicine and with the Gulu Regional Referral Hospital, the teaching hospital for the medical school. GRCC is expected to become functional in the financial year 2019/2020, which starts on 1 July 2019.

The establishment of the centre was informed by the increased patient burden at Uganda Cancer Institute, in Kampala, the country's capital city, where 4,500 to 6,000 new cancer patients are registered annually. As of May 2016, approximately 60,000 new cancer patients are diagnosed annually in Uganda. Of these, an estimated 47,000 (78.3 percent) cancer patients die of their disease within one year, partly due to "late diagnosis and inappropriate treatment".

Other regional cancer centers established in this effort include Arua Regional Cancer Centre, Mbarara Regional Cancer Centre and Mbale Regional Cancer Centre. In 2017, the government of Uganda borrowed €100 million (USh390 billion at that time), from the government of Austria to construct the four afore-mentioned cancer centres.

In November 2020, Matia Kasaija, Uganda's finance minister, signed documents, accepting an interest-free loan from the government of Austria and Unicredit Bank, amounting to €7.5 million (UGX:33 billion at the time), specifically intended to construct the new Gulu Regional Cancer Centre.

== Collaboration ==
The cancer centre works in collaboration with Uganda Cancer Institute (UCI), the leading cancer treatment and research institute in Uganda, which is under transformation into the East African Cancer Centre of Excellence. UCI specialists work together with Gulu Regional Referral Hospital staff to provide the necessary oncology care.

== Developments ==
As of August 2023, construction work on the facility was estimated at 80 percent complete. The center started partial operations in August 2023 with a complement of 19 staff members. Full operations are expected in 2024, when construction is fully completed. In November 2023, the cancer center started using two completed surgical operating rooms (ORs) out of the three ORs planned for the facility. The three most prevalent cancers at GRCC are (a) cervical cancer (b) breast cancer and (c) prostate cancer. 85 percent of cancer patients in Uganda reside in remote rural locations.

As of April 2024, with 90 percent of the first phase of construction completed, more land was needed to proceed with phase 2 and phase 3 of construction. Approximately 6 acres (2 ha) of new land are needed to install radiotherapy infrastructure. More land is also required to install a four-storied facility consisting of the main patient wards, an MRI suite, the main OPD, an emergency department, and general infusion and administration facilities. The third and final phase comprises a pediatric ward, High Dependency Unit, a fully equipped clinical laboratory and staff housing for the cancer center staff.

== See also ==
- Hospitals in Uganda
