= Mbarara Regional Cancer Centre =

Coordinates: 0.617500°S 30.654720°E

- Uganda Ministry of Health

Geography
- Location: Mbarara, Western Region, Uganda

Organisation
- Care system: Public
- Type: Cancer Treatment, Research and Teaching
- Affiliated university: Mbarara University of Science and Technology

History
- Founded: 12 May 2017

Links
- Other links: List of hospitals in Uganda

Mbarara Regional Cancer Centre (MRCC) is a public, specialised, tertiary care medical facility owned by the Uganda Ministry of Health. The facility is located along the Mbarara-Kabale Road, in the central business district of the city of Mbarara, on the campus of Mbarara Regional Referral Hospital.

== Overview ==
MRCC is a cancer treatment, research, and teaching centre, affiliated with the Mbarara University School of Medicine and with the Mbarara Regional Referral Hospital, the teaching hospital for the medical school. MRCC was founded in 2017, by Professor Frederick Kayanja and Professor Tony Wilson.

The establishment of the centre was informed by the increased patient burden at the Uganda Cancer Institute, where 4,500 to 6,000 new patients are registered annually. MRCC was registering about 3,000 new patients annually (approximately 9 patients daily), as of March 2018. Other regional cancer centres established in this effort include Arua Regional Cancer Centre, Gulu Regional Cancer Centre and Mbale Regional Cancer Centre. As of March 2018, the MRCC is hosted on one of the wards of Mbarara Hospital.

In 2017, the government of Uganda borrowed €100 million (USh390 billion at that time), from the government of Austria to construct a brand new cancer centre. The 2 acres (8,100 m^{2}), where the new centre is going to be built, was donated by Mbarara University of Science and Technology.

As of February 2019, Mbarara Cancer Centre cared for a cohort of cancer patients that exceeded 20,000 in number.

== Collaboration ==
The cancer centre works in collaboration with Uganda Cancer Institute, the leading cancer treatment and research institute in Uganda, which is under transformation into the East African Cancer Centre of Excellence.

== See also ==
- Hospitals in Uganda
