= Pottinger (District Electoral Area) =

Former electoral ward of Belfast, Northern Ireland

Coordinates: 54.594°N 5.898°W

Pottinger District Electoral Area
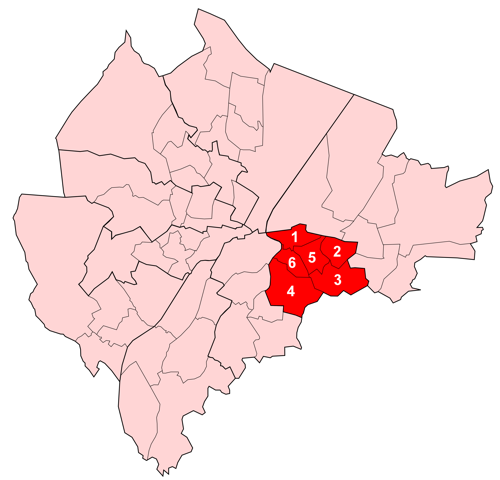
- Map showing Pottinger wards within Belfast
- Area: 6.17 km^{2} (2.38 sq mi)
- Population: 31,272 (2008 Estimate)
  - Density: 5,068/km^{2} (13,130/sq mi)
- District: Belfast City Council
- County: County Antrim
- Country: Northern Ireland
- Sovereign state: United Kingdom
- UK Parliament: Belfast South
- NI Assembly: Belfast South

Pottinger was one of the nine district electoral areas (DEA) in Belfast, Northern Ireland from 1985 to 2014. Located in the east of the city, the district elected six members to Belfast City Council and contained the wards of Ballymacarrett, Bloomfield, Orangefield, Ravenhill, The Mount, and Woodstock.

The wards of Ravenhill and Woodstock were part of the Belfast South constituencies for the Northern Ireland Assembly and UK Parliament, while the other four were part of the Belfast East Assembly and Parliamentary constituencies.

The district was bounded to the west by the River Lagan and the Ormeau Road, to the north by the Newtownards Road, to the east by Greenville Park and North Road and the Borough of Castlereagh to the south.

At the 2001 census the district had a Protestant majority, however there was also a large Catholic minority, particularly in areas such as the Short Strand, which is separated from the mainly unionist Cluan Place by one of the many peace lines in the district.

== History ==
The DEA was created for the 1985 local elections, when it largely replaced the former electoral Area A. Five of the six wards came from Area A with the Bloomfield ward added from Area B.

It was abolished for the 2014 local elections, when all of its wards except Orangefield formed part of a new Titanic district electoral area. The Orangefield ward became part of a new Lisnasharragh district electoral area.

== Amenities ==
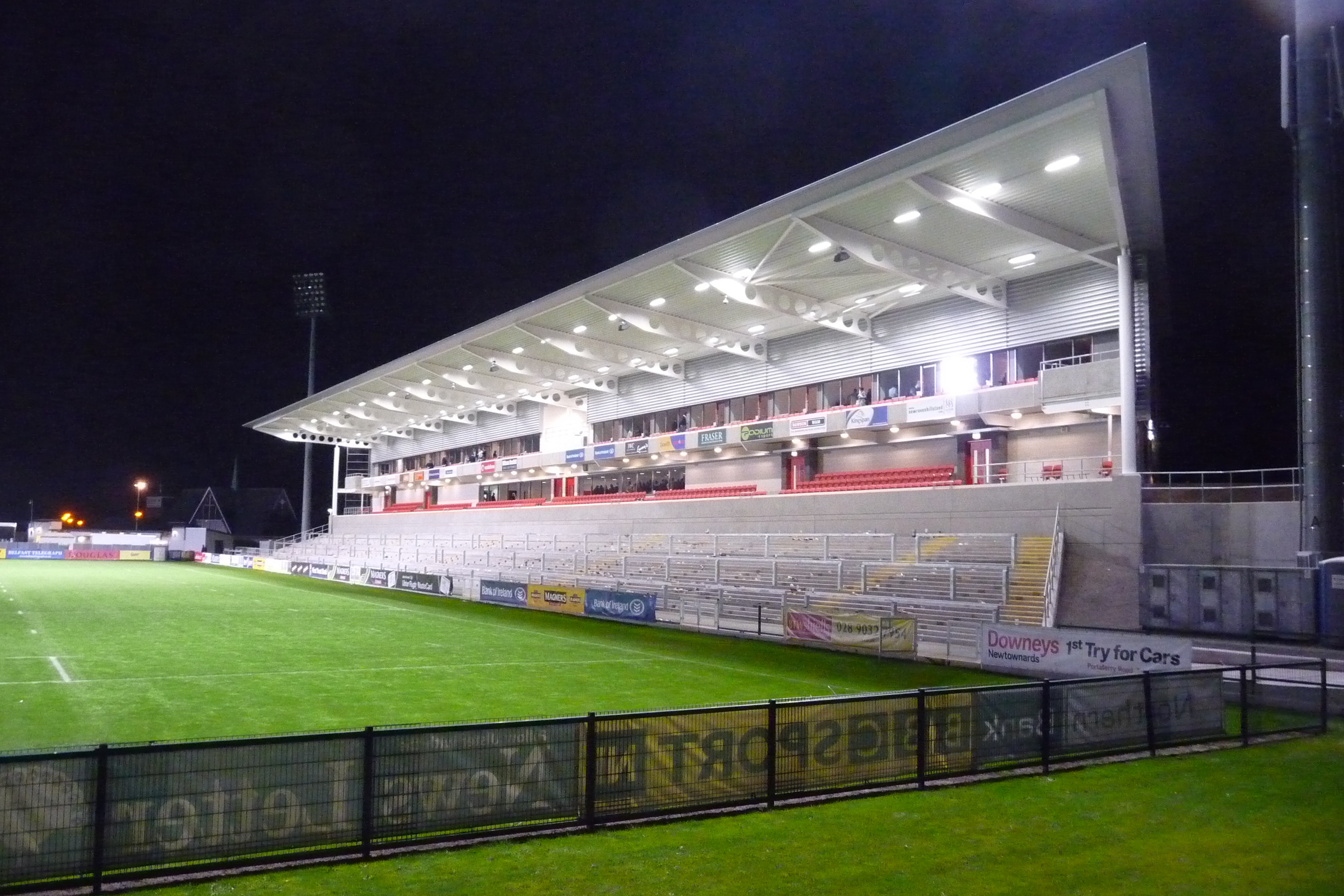
New stand at the Ravenhill Stadium, home of the Ulster Rugby team

Amenities in the Pottinger district electoral area include:

- Ormeau Golf Club
- Ormeau Park
- Ravenhill Stadium, home of the Ulster Rugby team

== Wards ==
Map	Ward	Population (2011 Census)	Catholic	Protestant	Other	No religion	Area	Density	NI Assembly	UK Parliament	Ref
1	Ballymacarrett	4,908	51.4%	41.2%	1.4%	6.2%	0.78 km^{2}	6,292 /km^{2}	Belfast East	Belfast East	
2	Bloomfield	5,453	16.1%	69.7%	1.7%	12.5%	0.74 km^{2}	7,369 /km^{2}	Belfast East	Belfast East	
3	Orangefield	5,619	11%	77%	1.4%	10.6%	1.46 km^{2}	3,849 /km^{2}	Belfast East	Belfast East	
4	Ravenhill	6,041	39.7%	46.9%	2%	11.5%	1.88 km^{2}	3,213 /km^{2}	Belfast South	Belfast South	
5	The Mount	5,591	16.1%	68.3%	1.3%	14.3%	0.75 km^{2}	7,455 /km^{2}	Belfast East	Belfast East	
6	Woodstock	5,445	19.4%	63.3%	2.8%	14.5%	0.56 km^{2}	9,723 /km^{2}	Belfast South	Belfast South	
Pottinger		33,057	25.3%	61.2%	1.8%	11.7%	6.17 km^{2}	5,358 /km^{2}			

== Councillors ==
Gate in the peace line to enter the Short Strand

Election	Councillor (party)	Councillor (party)	Councillor (party)	Councillor (party)	Councillor (party)	Councillor (party)
2011	Máire Hendron (Alliance)	Niall Ó Donnghaile (Sinn Féin)	Adam Newton (DUP)	May Campbell (DUP)	Gavin Robinson (DUP)	John Kyle (PUP)
2005	Máire Hendron (Alliance)	Reg Empey (UUP)	Margaret McKenzie (DUP)	May Campbell (DUP)	Sammy Wilson (DUP)	David Ervine (PUP)
2001	Joseph O'Donnell (Sinn Féin)	Reg Empey (UUP)	Margaret Clarke (UUP)	Harry Toan (DUP)	Sammy Wilson (DUP)	David Ervine (PUP)
1997	Mervyn Jones (Alliance)	Reg Empey (UUP)	Margaret Clarke (UUP)	Robert Cleland (DUP)	Sammy Wilson (DUP)	David Ervine (PUP)
1993	Mervyn Jones (Alliance)	Reg Empey (UUP)	Sandy Blair (UUP)	Robert Cleland (DUP)	Sammy Wilson (DUP)	Jim Walker (DUP)
1989	Mervyn Jones (Alliance)	Reg Empey (UUP)	Margaret Clarke (UUP)	Dorothy Dunlop (Independent Unionist)	Sammy Wilson (DUP)	Jim Walker (DUP)
1985	Mervyn Jones (Alliance)	Reg Empey (UUP)	Margaret Clarke (UUP)	Frank Leslie (DUP)	Sammy Wilson (DUP)	Jim Walker (DUP)

== 2011 election ==
2005: 3 x DUP, 1 x UUP, 1 x PUP, 1 x Alliance

2011: 3 x DUP, 1 x Alliance, 1 x Sinn Féin, 1 x PUP

2005-2011 change: Sinn Féin gain from UUP

Pottinger - 6 seats
Party	Candidate	FPv%	Count								
Party	Candidate	FPv%	1	2	3	4	5	6	7	8	9
Alliance	Máire Hendron*	19.89%	1,895								
DUP	Gavin Robinson	15.99%	1,523								
Sinn Féin	Niall Ó Donnghaile	11.31%	1,077	1,085.96	1,086.91	1,086.91	1,091.15	1,117.43	1,128.07	1,155.55	1,373.55
PUP	John Kyle	10.73%	1,022	1,084.72	1,091.76	1,101.04	1,109.04	1,112.36	1,176.89	1,210.81	1,257.85
DUP	May Campbell*	11.03%	1,051	1,085.24	1,110.76	1,117.19	1,120.05	1,121.05	1,167.41	1,196.81	1,206.01
DUP	Adam Newton	9.83%	936	971.84	1,082.61	1,083.72	1,086.79	1,086.79	1,109.97	1,129.71	1,138.63
UUP	Philip Robinson	8.25%	786	871.76	884.74	890.13	894.09	896.41	964.04	1,007.9	1,048.01
SDLP	Séamas De Faoite	4.79%	456	553.92	554.03	555.35	561.59	588.19	615.15	705.91	
Green (NI)	David Newman	2.34%	223	353.88	355.31	360.23	394.11	413.99	480.99		
TUV	John Hiddleston	2.01%	191	199.64	200.52	206.84	209.16	210.48			
Socialist Party	Tommy Black	1.57%	150	163.12	163.67	165.07	177.67	190.27			
Workers' Party	Kevin McNally	1.09%	104	111.68	111.79	115.43	125.31				
People Before Profit	Donna Marie McCusker	0.73%	70	92.4	92.73	95.01					
Independent	Karl Hedley	0.35%	33	42.28	42.83						
Independent	Samuel Smyth	0.09%	9	10.6	10.93						
Electorate: 19,929 Valid: 9,526 (47.80%) Spoilt: 190 Quota: 1,361 Turnout: 9,716 (48.75%)

== 2005 election ==
2001: 3 x DUP, 1 x UUP, 1 x PUP, 1 x Alliance

2005: 2 x DUP, 2 x UUP, 1 x PUP, 1 x Sinn Féin

2001-2005 change: DUP and Alliance gain from UUP and Sinn Féin

Pottinger - 6 seats
Party	Candidate	FPv%	Count					
Party	Candidate	FPv%	1	2	3	4	5	6
DUP	Sammy Wilson*	22.60%	2,385					
UUP	Reg Empey*	18.65%	1,968					
DUP	May Campbell	12.34%	1,302	1,530.29				
PUP	David Ervine*	10.95%	1,156	1,248.87	1,324.71	1,394.99	1,556.39	
DUP	Margaret McKenzie	6.79%	717	1,216.13	1,239.89	1,281.08	1,451.42	1,461.25
Alliance	Máire Hendron	7.53%	795	800.92	830.92	895.09	1,008.55	1,428.28
Sinn Féin	Deborah Devenny	8.94%	944	944	947.84	967.84	969.84	1,126.08
SDLP	Mary Muldoon	6.35%	670	672.22	677.26	743.18	766.22	
UUP	Sonia Copeland	2.62%	277	303.64	524.92	644.92		
Socialist Party	Tommy Black	1.57%	163	165.96	168.36			
Workers' Party	Joseph Bell	0.99%	105	105.74	106.74			
UUP	Henry Wallace	0.68%	72	85.69	180.25			
Electorate: 19,621 Valid: 10,554 (53.79%) Spoilt: 381 Quota: 1,508 Turnout: 10,935 (55.73%)

== 2001 election ==
1997: 2 x DUP, 2 x UUP, 1 x PUP, 1 x Sinn Féin

2001: 2 x DUP, 2 x UUP, 1 x PUP, 1 x Alliance

1997-2001 change: Sinn Féin gain from Alliance

Pottinger - 6 seats
Party	Candidate	FPv%	Count									
Party	Candidate	FPv%	1	2	3	4	5	6	7	8	9	10
DUP	Sammy Wilson*	30.21%	3,918									
UUP	Reg Empey*	23.88%	3,097									
PUP	David Ervine*	12.20%	1,582	1,748.42	2,005.46							
UUP	Margaret Clarke*	4.31%	559	621.01	1,279.99	1,338.86	1,366.14	1,398.3	1,406.09	1,508.73	1,524.67	1,892.91
Sinn Féin	Joseph O'Donnell	9.75%	1,264	1,264	1,265.68	1,266.26	1,267.26	1,268.26	1,285.26	1,287.26	1,451.29	1,567.85
DUP	Harry Toan	1.58%	205	1,377.89	1,430.39	1,440.54	1,445.54	1,475.47	1,477.47	1,529.03	1,532.03	1,552.64
DUP	Mary Campbell	4.45%	577	1,146.22	1,196.62	1,204.16	1,209.37	1,232.61	1,236.56	1,297.52	1,302.59	1,328.67
Alliance	Mervyn Jones*	5.34%	693	702.01	801.13	825.2	842.04	845.14	881.27	929.43	1,189.34	
SDLP	Leo Van Es	3.54%	459	463.24	514.06	518.41	518.41	518.41	554.41	561.83		
Independent	John Bushell	1.68%	218	236.55	254.19	259.7	262.12	268.5	283.98			
PUP	Robin Stewart	0.97%	127	132.3	141.12	163.16	168.29	175.43	177.43			
Workers' Party	Joseph Bell	0.99%	129	131.65	134.59	136.04	138.33	140.33				
UK Unionist	David Fairfield	0.57%	74	94.14	118.5	127.49	135.57					
NI Conservatives	Jason Docherty	0.51%	66	70.24	89.56	93.91						
Electorate: 21,854 Valid: 12,968 (59.34%) Spoilt: 458 Quota: 1,853 Turnout: 13,426 (61.43%)

== 1997 election ==
1993: 3 x DUP, 2 x UUP, 1 x Alliance

1997: 2 x DUP, 2 x UUP, 1 x PUP, 1 x Alliance

1993-1997 change: PUP gain from DUP

Pottinger - 6 seats
Party	Candidate	FPv%	Count											
Party	Candidate	FPv%	1	2	3	4	5	6	7	8	9	10	11	12
UUP	Reg Empey*	20.32%	2,309											
DUP	Sammy Wilson*	19.94%	2,265											
PUP	David Ervine	18.57%	2,110											
UUP	Margaret Clarke	6.76%	768	1,265.55	1,309.63	1,340.83	1,345	1,347.62	1,358.2	1,385.31	1,387.1	1,625.38		
DUP	Robert Cleland*	5.33%	605	636.62	822.22	847.18	852.58	852.58	856.87	889.14	889.43	928.08	1,324.88	1,536.14
Alliance	Mervyn Jones*	7.66%	870	886.74	892.83	906.51	913.8	937.04	1,004.94	1,013.63	1,218.16	1,237.87	1,241.33	1,306.26
Sinn Féin	Dominic Corr	8.61%	978	978	978	978	978	992	996	996	1,100.29	1,100.29	1,100.29	1,102.25
PUP	Alexander Gordon	2.31%	262	281.84	298.37	615.65	622.49	625.97	641.61	692.25	699.49	723.33	763.61	
DUP	Frank Leslie	1.25%	142	160.91	487.45	504.49	506.78	506.78	510.91	545.02	546.02	567.76		
UUP	Alexander Blair*	2.21%	251	320.75	338.73	356.49	360.07	372.31	377.1	395.04	398.35			
SDLP	Marga Foley	2.72%	309	310.55	311.42	312.14	315.14	349.14	384.38	384.38				
Ulster Democratic	Robert Girvan	1.49%	169	188.53	210.57	255.69	263.55	267.03	271.03					
NI Women's Coalition	Pearl Sagar	1.31%	149	151.48	153.22	160.66	173.95	182.43						
Workers' Party	Joseph Bell	1.01%	115	115.62	115.91	118.79	124.34							
Ulster Independence	Josephine Challis	0.18%	21	23.48	24.93	26.13								
Labour Coalition	Sean McGouran	0.17%	19	19	20.45	20.69								
Natural Law	David Collins	0.17%	19	19.31	19.6	19.84								
Electorate: 21,854 Valid: 12,968 (59.34%) Spoilt: 458 Quota: 1,853 Turnout: 13,426 (61.43%)

== 1993 election ==
1989: 2 x DUP, 2 x UUP, 1 x Alliance, 1 Independent Unionist

1993: 3 x DUP, 2 x UUP, 1 x Alliance

1989-1993 change: DUP gain from Independent Unionist

Pottinger - 6 seats
Party	Candidate	FPv%	Count							
Party	Candidate	FPv%	1	2	3	4	5	6	7	8
DUP	Sammy Wilson*	25.52%	2,784							
Alliance	Mervyn Jones*	12.99%	1,417	1,427.35	1,461.35	1,476.15	1,700.15			
DUP	Jim Walker*	7.27%	793	1,476.55	1,478.55	1,549.15	1,566.15			
UUP	Reg Empey*	11.87%	1,295	1,380.95	1,381.95	1,408.8	1,418.8	1,428.8	1,612.8	
DUP	Robert Cleland	9.00%	982	1,252.45	1,254.45	1,307.9	1,324.8	1,326.8	1,379.45	1,388.45
UUP	Alexander Blair	8.22%	897	919.05	921.05	931.95	960.3	979.3	1,070.15	1,080.15
UUP	Margaret Clarke*	6.91%	754	778.75	782.2	790.1	802.55	807.55	926.65	939.65
Sinn Féin	Joseph O'Donnell	6.50%	709	709	713	714	754	769	771	
NI Conservatives	Dorothy Dunlop*	4.93%	538	574	580	595.15	624.15	644.15		
Independent Labour	Colin Ballentine	2.48%	271	273.25	297.25	305.25				
Workers' Party	Joseph Bell	2.08%	227	228.35	240.35	243.8				
Ind. Unionist	Samuel Walker	1.22%	133	214.9	216.9					
Green (NI)	Thaddeus Bradley	0.98%	107	108.35						
Electorate: 24,293 Valid: 10,907 (44.90%) Spoilt: 482 Quota: 1,559 Turnout: 11,389 (46.89%)

== 1989 election ==
1985: 3 x DUP, 2 x UUP, 1 x Alliance

1989: 2 x DUP, 2 x UUP, 1 x Alliance, 1 Independent Unionist

1985-1989 change: Independent Unionist gain from DUP

Pottinger - 6 seats
Party	Candidate	FPv%	Count					
Party	Candidate	FPv%	1	2	3	4	5	6
DUP	Sammy Wilson*	25.88%	2,780					
UUP	Margaret Clarke*	13.78%	1,480	1,524.55	1,537.55			
Alliance	Mervyn Jones*	12.07%	1,296	1,309.05	1,314.3	1,326.75	1,599.75	
DUP	Jim Walker*	4.59%	493	1,268.35	1,479.35	1,531.7	1,546.7	
Ind. Unionist	Dorothy Dunlop	10.98%	1,179	1,225.8	1,245.75	1,313.9	1,344.35	1,357.35
UUP	Reg Empey*	8.04%	864	921.15	942.1	1,210.2	1,220.2	1,226.2
DUP	Frank Leslie*	7.15%	768	900.3	1,015	1,044.05	1,056.5	1,064.4
Sinn Féin	Joseph O'Donnell	5.86%	629	629.45	631.9	631.9	677.9	
Workers' Party	Sean Flanagan	5.04%	541	543.7	546.7	548.7		
UUP	David McNutt	3.91%	420	447	457.15			
DUP	John Norris	2.45%	263	381.8				
National Front	Stuart McCullough	0.25%	27	29.7				
Electorate: 24,265 Valid: 10,740 (44.26%) Spoilt: 508 Quota: 1,535 Turnout: 11,248 (46.35%)

== 1985 election ==
1985: 3 x DUP, 2 x UUP, 1 x Alliance

Pottinger - 6 seats
Party	Candidate	FPv%	Count							
Party	Candidate	FPv%	1	2	3	4	5	6	7	8
DUP	Sammy Wilson*	19.99%	2,454							
DUP	Frank Leslie	18.11%	2,224							
UUP	Margaret Clarke	16.28%	1,999							
DUP	Jim Walker	9.39%	1,153	1,763.12						
UUP	Reg Empey	9.10%	1,117	1,143.6	1,442.8	1,630.12	1,659.16	1,660.5	1,756.5	
Alliance	Mervyn Jones	8.30%	1,019	1,026.56	1,039.48	1,044.64	1,127.4	1,272.74	1,309.88	1,547.28
UUP	Harry Fletcher	3.51%	431	449.2	546.1	569.38	594.16	595.16	706.38	727.66
Sinn Féin	Joseph O'Donnell	4.61%	566	566	566	566	572.28	634.6	635.6	713.42
Workers' Party	Francis Cullen	2.47%	303	304.12	306.5	312.02	398.48	496.48	514.94	
PUP	David Ervine	3.21%	394	402.12	442.58	448.1	459.68	460.68		
SDLP	Carmel Maginness	2.77%	340	340.28	342.32	342.32	353.66			
Labour and Trade Union	Stan Dempsey	1.78%	218	219.68	227.16	232.44				
Communist	James Stewart	0.25%	61	64.08	66.8	67.16				
Electorate: 24,757 Valid: 12,279 (49.60%) Spoilt: 506 Quota: 1,755 Turnout: 12,785 (51.64%)

== See also ==
- Belfast City Council
- Electoral wards of Belfast
- Local government in Northern Ireland
- Members of Belfast City Council
- Belfast Pottinger (UK Parliament constituency)
- Belfast Pottinger (Northern Ireland Parliament constituency)
- Belfast Willowfield (Northern Ireland Parliament constituency)
- 2011 Northern Ireland local elections#Belfast
- 2005 Northern Ireland local elections#Belfast
- 2001 Northern Ireland local elections#Belfast
- 1997 Northern Ireland local elections#Belfast
- 1993 Northern Ireland local elections#Belfast
- 1989 Northern Ireland local elections#Belfast
- 1985 Northern Ireland local elections#Belfast
