= Pontiano Kaleebu =

Ugandan physician (born 1960)

- Born: 1960 (age 65–66); Uganda
- Citizenship: Uganda
- Education: Makerere University (Bachelor of Medicine and Bachelor of Surgery); University of London (Diploma in Immunology) (Doctor of Philosophy in Immunology)
- Occupations: Physician, Academic; Clinical Immunologist; HIV/AIDS Researcher and Medical Administrator
- Years active: 1995 – present
- Known for: Professional competence
- Title: Executive Director of Uganda Virus Research Institute

Pontiano Kaleebu is a Ugandan physician, clinical immunologist, HIV/AIDS researcher, academic and medical administrator, who is the executive director of the Uganda Virus Research Institute.

He also concurrently serves as the director of the joint clinical research unit owned by the Medical Research Council (United Kingdom), the Uganda Virus Research Institute, and the London School of Hygiene & Tropical Medicine, located in Entebbe, Uganda, carrying on research in infectious, non-communicable and neglected diseases.

== Background and education ==
Pontiano Kaleebu was born in Uganda, circa 1960. He attended Jinja Kaloli Primary School, in Wakiso District, where he obtained his Primary Leaving Certificate. He then transferred to St. Mary's College Kisubi, where he undertook his O-Level studies. He completed his A-Level education at Kampala High School, where he obtained his High School Diploma.

He was admitted to Makerere University School of Medicine, where he graduated with a Bachelor of Medicine and Bachelor of Surgery degree in the mid 1980s. He interned at St. Francis Hospital Nsambya, under Dr. Merriam Duggan.

In 1988, Kaleebu was awarded a scholarship to study immunology at the Royal Postgraduate Medical School, at Hammersmith Hospital, in West London, in the United Kingdom. He graduated with a Diploma in Immunology.

While in London, he was offered the opportunity to pursue a doctorate in immunology, by the University of London, on scholarship, under Professor Jonathan Weber, at St Mary's Hospital, London. He completed his PhD program in the mid 1990s.

== Career ==
1987, Kaleebu was recruited as a medical research officer at the Uganda Virus Research Institute, by its director, Dr. Sylvester Sempala. Following the completion of his PhD studies, Kaleebu returned to the institute and was appointed as the head of the immunology department. The following year, he joined the joint research programme at the Medical Research Council and the Uganda Virus Research Institute.

Kaleebu has become a leading international researcher in the areas of immunology and virology and is a member to the international team that participated the first vaccine trial in Africa against HIV/AIDS. In the late 2000s, he became the director of the Uganda Virus Research Institute in an acting capacity. He was confirmed in that position in the mid-2010s. He is a professor of immunovirology at the London School of Hygiene and Tropical Medicine.

== Other considerations ==
His main research interests are HIV vaccine research, especially understanding HIV diversity and resistance to antiretroviral drugs, as well as the protective immune responses. He is the recipient of numerous Awards including the Scientific Achievement Award from Rotary International, awarded in 2003; the Presidential Science Award 2005/2006; and the Fellowship of Imperial College London, Faculty of Medicine, awarded in 2010. He is a Fellow of the Royal College of Physicians of Edinburgh, the Academy of Medical Sciences, and the Uganda National Academy of Science. He has co-authored more than 260 publications in peer reviewed journals.

== Awards ==
He received a medal of service from the Republic of Uganda.

Political offices
Preceded by Edward Katongole-Mbidde; As Director Uganda Virus Research Institute	Director Uganda Virus Research Institute; 2016 - Present	Succeeded by Incumbent; As Director Uganda Virus Research Institute
