= Naomi Long =

Minister of Justice of Northern Ireland since 2024

Naomi Long MLA
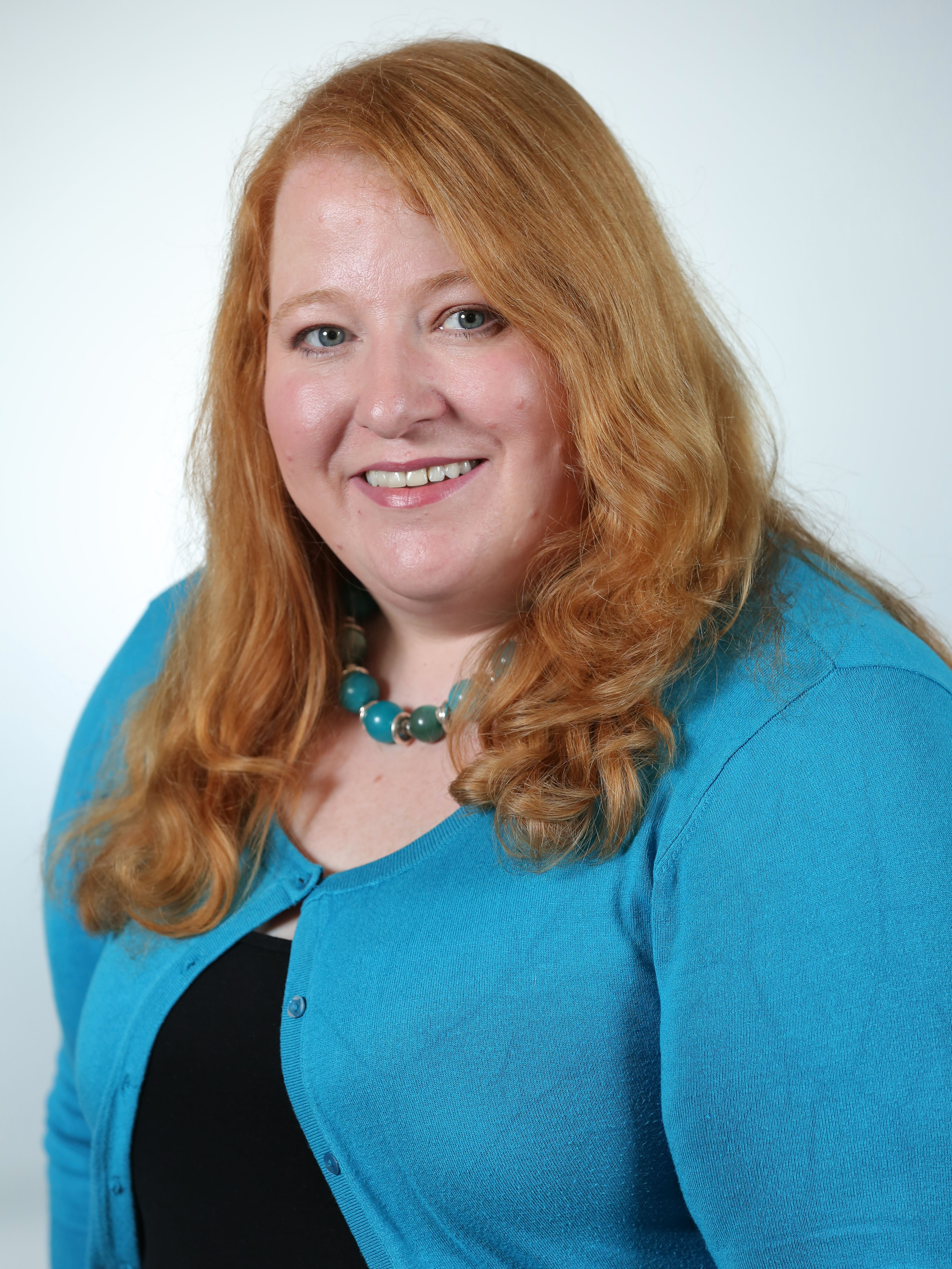
- Official portrait, 2016

Minister of Justice
- Incumbent
- Assumed office 3 February 2024
- First Minister: Michelle O'Neill
- Preceded by: Herself (2022)
- In office 11 January 2020 – 27 October 2022
- First Minister: Arlene Foster; Paul Givan; Vacant
- Preceded by: Claire Sugden
- Succeeded by: Herself (2024)

Leader of the Alliance Party
- Incumbent
- Assumed office 26 October 2016
- Deputy: Stephen Farry; Eóin Tennyson
- Preceded by: David Ford

Deputy Leader of the Alliance Party
- In office 18 February 2006 – 26 October 2016
- Leader: David Ford
- Preceded by: Eileen Bell
- Succeeded by: Stephen Farry

Member of the Legislative Assembly for Belfast East
- Incumbent
- Assumed office 9 January 2020
- Preceded by: Máire Hendron
- In office 5 May 2016 – 1 July 2019
- Preceded by: Judith Cochrane
- Succeeded by: Máire Hendron
- In office 26 November 2003 – 5 July 2010
- Preceded by: John Alderdice
- Succeeded by: Chris Lyttle

Member of the European Parliament for Northern Ireland
- In office 2 July 2019 – 31 January 2020
- Preceded by: Jim Nicholson
- Succeeded by: Constituency abolished

Member of Parliament for Belfast East
- In office 6 May 2010 – 30 March 2015
- Preceded by: Peter Robinson
- Succeeded by: Gavin Robinson

66th Lord Mayor of Belfast
- In office 1 June 2009 – 1 June 2010
- Deputy: Danny Lavery
- Preceded by: Tom Hartley
- Succeeded by: Pat Convery

Member of the Belfast City Council for Victoria Ward
- In office 7 June 2001 – 26 August 2010
- Preceded by: Danny Dow
- Succeeded by: Laura McNamee

Personal details
- Born: Naomi Rachel Johnston; 13 December 1971 (age 54) Belfast, Northern Ireland
- Party: Alliance
- Spouse: Michael Long (m. 1995)
- Relations: Adrian Long (father-in-law)
- Education: Queen's University Belfast
- Awards: BBC 100 Women (2022)

Naomi Rachel Long MLA (née Johnston; born 13 December 1971) is a Northern Irish politician who has served as Minister of Justice in the Northern Ireland Executive since February 2024, having previously served from January 2020 to October 2022. She has served as leader of the Alliance Party since 2016 and a Member of the Legislative Assembly (MLA) for Belfast East since 2020.

Long served as Lord Mayor of Belfast from 2009 to 2010 and represented Belfast East in the Northern Ireland Assembly from 2003 to 2010. She resigned as an MLA after being elected as the Member of Parliament (MP) for Belfast East at the 2010 general election. She served for one parliamentary term and lost her seat to the Democratic Unionist Party (DUP) at the 2015 general election. She returned to the Northern Ireland Assembly in 2016, before resigning for a second time after being elected as a Member of the European Parliament (MEP) for Northern Ireland in 2019. After the United Kingdom left the European Union in 2020, Long returned as an MLA and was appointed Minister of Justice in the Northern Ireland Executive.

== Background ==
Born in east Belfast, Long attended Mersey Street Primary and Bloomfield Collegiate School. She graduated from Queen's University of Belfast with a degree in civil engineering in 1994, worked in a structural engineering consultancy for two years, held a research and training post at Queen's University for three years, and then went back into environmental and hydraulic engineering consultancy for four years.

== Political career ==
Long first took political office in 2001 when she was elected to Belfast City Council for the Victoria electoral area. In 2003 Long was elected to the Northern Ireland Assembly for Belfast East, succeeding her fellow party member John Alderdice. In 2006 she was named deputy leader of her party. In 2007 she more than doubled the party's vote in the constituency, being placed second ahead of the leader of the Ulster Unionist Party. The overall UUP vote, however, was 22%. At 18.8%, her vote share was higher than that for Alderdice in 1998.

On 1 June 2009, she was elected as Lord Mayor of Belfast, defeating William Humphrey (Democratic Unionist Party) by 26 votes to 24 in a vote at a council meeting. She became the second woman to hold the post, after Grace Bannister (1981–82).

=== Member of Parliament ===
On 6 May 2010, Long defeated Peter Robinson, First Minister of Northern Ireland and leader of the DUP, to become Member of Parliament (MP) for Belfast East in the House of Commons. She became the first MP elected to Westminster for the Alliance Party (previously, Stratton Mills, a former Ulster Unionist Party MP, had changed parties to Alliance). Long also became the first Liberal-affiliated MP elected to Westminster in Northern Ireland since James Brown Dougherty in Londonderry City in 1914. Despite the close relationship between the Alliance Party and the Liberal Democrats, Long did not sit with the coalition government nor take the coalition whip and was not a member of the Liberal Democrats.

On 10 December 2012, Long received a number of death threats and a petrol bomb was thrown inside an unmarked police car guarding her constituency office. This violence erupted as a reaction by Ulster loyalists to the decision by Alliance Party members of Belfast City Council to vote in favour of restricting the flying of the Union flag at Belfast City Hall to designated days throughout the year, which at the time constituted 18 specific days.

In 2015, Long lost her seat in the Commons to Gavin Robinson of the DUP, as a result of a five-party unionist pact in the constituency which saw the UUP, UKIP, TUV and PUP all stand aside in favour of Robinson.

She contested the seat for Alliance at the next two elections, and was the unsuccessful Alliance PPC for Belfast East for the 2024 United Kingdom general election.

=== Return to the Northern Ireland Assembly ===
In January 2016, Long announced that she would return as an Assembly candidate in the 2016 elections having been nominated in place of incumbent Judith Cochrane. She was subsequently elected on the first count with 14.7% of first-preference votes. Following her return to the Assembly, Long assumed positions on the Committee for Communities, the All Party Group on Fairtrade, the All Party Group for Housing, and chaired the All Party Group on Science, Technology, Engineering and Mathematics.

In August 2016, Long called for Sinn Féin's Máirtín Ó Muilleoir to stand aside as Minister of Finance during an investigation of the Stormont Finance Committee's handling of its Nama inquiry, while Ó Muilleoir was a committee member. This followed allegations that his party had "coached" loyalist blogger Jamie Bryson prior to his appearance before the committee.

In November 2016, Long criticised Sinn Féin and the DUP for delaying the publication of a working group report on abortion, which recommended legislative changes in cases of fatal foetal abnormality, calling on the Executive "to act without further delay to help women who decide to seek a termination in these very difficult circumstances".

=== Leader of the Alliance Party ===
On 26 October 2016, Long was elected Alliance leader unopposed following the resignation of David Ford. In the first manifesto released under her leadership, Long affirmed her commitment to building a "united, open, liberal and progressive" society. Her party's legislative priorities were revealed to include the harmonisation and strengthening of equality and anti-discrimination measures, the introduction of civil marriage equality, development of integrated education and a Northern Ireland framework to tackle climate change.

In the 2017 Assembly election, Long topped the poll in Belfast East and was returned to the Assembly with 18.9% of first-preference votes. The election was widely viewed as a success for Alliance, with the party increasing its vote share by 2 percentage points and retaining all of its seats in a smaller Assembly. The party subsequently held the balance of power at Stormont.

Alliance targeted two seats in South and Belfast East in the 2017 general election. During the campaign, Long reaffirmed her support for a People's Vote, marriage equality, Votes at 16 and greater transparency surrounding political donations. She also pledged to oppose any rollback of the Human Rights Act.

Following the collapse of talks to restore devolution in February 2018, Long reiterated her view that the pay of MLAs should be cut in the absence of a functioning Executive. In March 2018, Alliance launched its 'Next Steps Forward' paper, outlining a number of proposals aimed at breaking the deadlock and Stormont. At the 2019 Alliance Party Conference, she accused Secretary of State for Northern Ireland Karen Bradley of an "appalling dereliction of duty" over the ongoing stalemate, saying that she had made "no concerted effort to end this interminable drift despite it allegedly being her top priority".

In the 2019 local elections, Alliance saw a 65% rise in its representation on councils. Long hailed the "incredible result" as a watershed moment for politics in Northern Ireland.

Long was elected to the European Parliament as a representative for Northern Ireland in May 2019 with 18.5% of first-preference votes, the best ever result for Alliance. She was subsequently replaced in the Assembly by Máire Hendron, a founding member of the party and former deputy lord mayor of Belfast. She then replaced Hendron in the Assembly with effect from 9 January 2020.

In 2019, Long became the first Northern Ireland politician to have served at every level of government.

In March 2022, Long told the Alliance Party Conference that "some politicians are addicted to crisis and conflict and simply not up to the job of actually governing". Long led Alliance into the 2022 Assembly election on a platform of integrated education, health reform, a Green New Deal, tackling paramilitarism and reform of the Stormont institutions.

=== Minister of Justice ===
On 11 January 2020, following the restoration of the Northern Ireland Assembly after three years of stalemate, Long was elected Minister of Justice in the Northern Ireland Executive. On 28 January, Long announced that she would progress new domestic abuse legislation through the Assembly which would make coercive control a criminal offence in Northern Ireland. In June 2020, Long commissioned a review into the support available for prison officers following concerns about absence rates. That same month, she announced her intention to introduce unexplained wealth orders in Northern Ireland to target paramilitary and criminal finances.

In November 2020, Long said she was seriously reconsidering her position within the Executive following the DUP's deployment of a cross-community vote to prevent an extension of COVID-19 regulations. She told BBC News, "I have asked people to desist from this abuse of power because it will make my position in the executive unsustainable."

== Personal life ==
Long is a member of Bloomfield Presbyterian Church. Following the Church's decision to exclude those in same-sex relationships from being full members, she expressed "great concern" and stated that she "didn't know" if she would remain a member herself. She is married to Michael Long, an Alliance councillor on Belfast City Council and former Lord Mayor of Belfast, and son of the engineer Professor Adrian Long. The couple live in Ballyhackamore, Belfast. Long and her husband are the first husband and wife to have both served as Lord Mayors of Belfast.

In August 2017, Long revealed that she had been suffering from endometriosis and would undergo surgery for the condition.

== Electoral history ==
UK Parliament elections

Year	Constituency	Party	Votes	%	Result
2005	Belfast East	Alliance Party	3,746	12.2	Not elected
2010	Belfast East	Alliance Party	12,839	37.2	Elected
2015	Belfast East	Alliance Party	16,978	42.8	Not elected
2017	Belfast East	Alliance Party	15,443	36.0	Not elected
2019	Belfast East	Alliance Party	19,055	44.9	Not elected
2024	Belfast East	Alliance Party	17,218	40.3	Not elected

Northern Ireland Assembly elections

Year	Constituency	Party	First-preference votes	%	Result
2003	Belfast East	Alliance Party	2,774	9.0	Elected
2007	Belfast East	Alliance Party	5,583	18.8	Elected
2016	Belfast East	Alliance Party	5,482	14.7	Elected
2017	Belfast East	Alliance Party	7,610	18.9	Elected
2022	Belfast East	Alliance Party	8,195	18.95	Elected

European Parliament election

Year	Constituency	Party	First-preference votes	%	Result
2019	Northern Ireland	Alliance Party	105,928	18.50	Elected

European Parliament
Preceded by Jim Nicholson	MEP for Northern Ireland; 2019 – 2020	Constituency abolished
Northern Ireland Assembly
Preceded by John Alderdice	Member of the Legislative Assembly for Belfast East; 2003–2010	Succeeded by Chris Lyttle
Preceded by Judith Cochrane	Member of the Legislative Assembly for Belfast East; 2016–2019	Succeeded by Máire Hendron
Preceded by Máire Hendron	Member of the Legislative Assembly for Belfast East; 2020–present	Incumbent
Preceded by Claire Sugden	Minister of Justice; 2020–2022	Vacant
Party political offices
Preceded by Eileen Bell	Deputy Leader of the Alliance Party of Northern Ireland; 2006–2016	Succeeded by Stephen Farry
Preceded by David Ford	Leader of the Alliance Party of Northern Ireland; 2016–present	Incumbent
Civic offices
Preceded by Tom Hartley	Lord Mayor of Belfast; 2009–2010	Succeeded by Pat Convery
Parliament of the United Kingdom
Preceded by Peter Robinson	Member of Parliament for Belfast East; 2010–2015	Succeeded by Gavin Robinson
