= Mbale Regional Cancer Centre =

Coordinates: 01°04′35″N 34°10′36″E

- Uganda Ministry of Health

Geography
- Location: Mbale, Eastern Region, Uganda

Organisation
- Care system: Public
- Type: Cancer Treatment, Research and Teaching
- Affiliated university: Busitema University

History
- Opened: 2019

Links
- Other links: List of hospitals in Uganda

Mbale Regional Cancer Centre (MbRCC) is a public, specialized, tertiary care medical facility owned by the Uganda Ministry of Health, intended to serve the Eastern Region of Uganda.

== Location ==
When established, the centre is expected to be on the campus of Mbale Regional Referral Hospital, which is responsible for the day-to-day running of the establishment. This is located off of Pallisa Road, in the central business district of the city of Mbale, the largest city in the Eastern Region of Uganda. This is approximately 221 kilometres (137 mi), by road, northeast of Kampala, the largest city in Uganda and its national capital.

== Overview ==
MbRCC is a cancer treatment, research, and teaching center, affiliated with the Busitema University School of Medicine and with the Mbale Regional Referral Hospital. MbRCC is expected to become functional in the 2019/2020 financial year, which starts on 1 July 2019.

The establishment of the centre is aimed towards relieving the increased patient burden at Uganda Cancer Institute, in Kampala, where 4,500 to 6,000 new patients are registered annually. Other regional cancer centers established in this effort include Arua Regional Cancer Centre, Gulu Regional Cancer Centre and Mbarara Regional Cancer Centre.

== Collaboration ==
The cancer centre works in collaboration with Uganda Cancer Institute (UCI), the leading cancer treatment and research institute in Uganda, which is under transformation into the East African Cancer Centre of Excellence. UCI specialists work together with Arua Regional Referral Hospital staff to provide the necessary oncology care.

== See also ==
- Hospitals in Uganda
