= Arua Regional Cancer Centre =

Coordinates: 3.018345°N 30.913889°E

- Uganda Ministry of Health

Geography
- Location: Arua, Northern Region, Uganda

Organisation
- Care system: Public
- Type: Cancer Treatment, Research and Teaching
- Affiliated university: Muni University

History
- Founded: 2017

Links
- Other links: List of hospitals in Uganda

Arua Regional Cancer Centre (ARCC) is a public, specialised, tertiary care medical facility owned by the Uganda Ministry of Health. The facility is located off of Weatherhead Lane, in the central business district of the city of Arua, on the campus of Arua Regional Referral Hospital.

It is expected, at a later date, that a standalone regional cancer centre in Arua will be constructed.

== Overview ==
ARCC is a cancer treatment, research, and teaching centre, affiliated with the Muni University and with the Arua Regional Referral Hospital. ARCC was founded in 2017, according to the Uganda Ministry of Health. As of March 2018, ARCC is housed on the premises of Arua Regional Referral Hospital.

The establishment of the centre came about as a result of the increased patient burden at Uganda Cancer Institute, where 4,500 to 6,000 new patients are registered annually. Other regional cancer centres established in this effort include Mbarara Regional Cancer Centre, Gulu Regional Cancer Centre and Mbale Regional Cancer Centre.

== Collaboration ==
The cancer centre works in collaboration with Uganda Cancer Institute (UCI), the leading cancer treatment and research institute in Uganda, which is under transformation into the East African Cancer Centre of Excellence. UCI specialists work together with Arua Regional Referral Hospital staff to provide the necessary oncology care.

== See also ==
- Hospitals in Uganda
