= Niall Ó Donnghaile =

Irish former politician (born 1985)

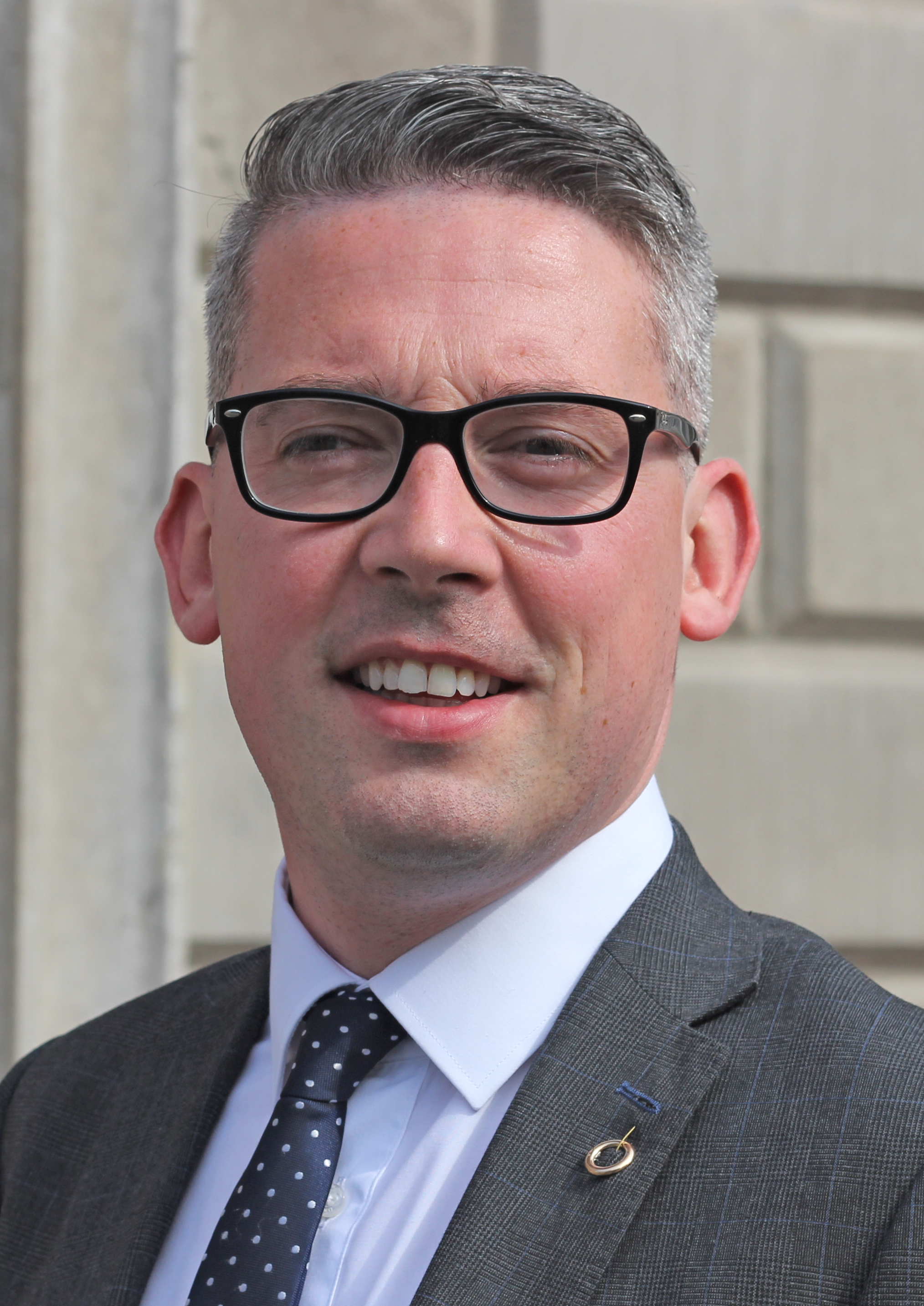
- Ó Donnghaile in 2016

Leader of Sinn Féin in the Seanad
- In office 29 June 2020 – 22 January 2024
- Leader: Mary Lou McDonald
- Preceded by: Rose Conway-Walsh
- Succeeded by: Conor Murphy

Senator
- In office 8 June 2016 – 22 January 2024
- Constituency: Administrative Panel

68th Lord Mayor of Belfast
- In office 5 June 2011 – 6 June 2012
- Deputy: Ruth Patterson
- Preceded by: Pat Convery
- Succeeded by: Gavin Robinson

Member of Belfast City Council
- In office 22 May 2014 – 26 May 2016
- Preceded by: District created
- Succeeded by: Mairéad O'Donnell
- Constituency: Titanic
- In office 5 May 2011 – 22 May 2014
- Preceded by: Reg Empey
- Succeeded by: District abolished
- Constituency: Pottinger

Personal details
- Born: 28 May 1985 (age 41) Short Strand, Belfast, Northern Ireland
- Party: Sinn Féin
- Education: University of Ulster

Niall Ó Donnghaile (Irish pronunciation: [ˈn̠ʲiəl̪ˠ oː ˈd̪ˠɔn̪ˠiːlʲə]; born 28 May 1985) is an Irish former Sinn Féin politician who served as a senator for the Administrative Panel from 2016 to 2024. He was the Leader of Sinn Féin in the Seanad from June 2020 to January 2024. He previously served as Lord Mayor of Belfast from 2011 to 2012 and a councillor on Belfast City Council from 2011 to 2016.

== Early life and career ==
Ó Donnghaile was born in Belfast, Northern Ireland. He was educated through the Irish language at Coláiste Feirste, Belfast, and subsequently obtained a Bachelor of Arts in Politics from Ulster University.

A community worker in the Short Strand (the area of East Belfast in which he was born) and a member of the Short Strand Partnership Board, he also works with various other organisations in Belfast on issues such as the developments at Titanic Quarter and Sirocco Quays, and has spoken in support of residents on the issue of the proposed runway extension at Belfast City Airport.

== Political career ==
Ó Donnghaile was a Sinn Féin councillor for the Pottinger district electoral area in East Belfast. He was previously employed as the party's press officer in the Northern Ireland Assembly.

=== Lord Mayor of Belfast ===
Ó Donnghaile as Mayor of Belfast in 2011

Ó Donnghaile became Lord Mayor of Belfast in June 2011. Aged 25 at the time, he was the city's youngest-ever lord mayor.

After taking office, he removed portraits of Queen Elizabeth The Queen Mother and Prince Charles from the Mayor's parlour, replacing them with a portrait of the United Irishmen and a copy of the Proclamation of the Irish Republic. He kept portraits of Elizabeth II and Prince Philip on display. He said he did this to make the parlour "more reflective of Belfast". Unionist councillors demanded that the two royal portraits be put back.

In December 2011, he declined to present an award to a Belfast girl who was a British Army cadet. He explained: "At the last minute I was informed that one of the awards was to be presented to a representative of the Army Cadet Force [...] to avoid any unnecessary sensitivities to either party, it was arranged for the outgoing chairman of the organisation to present some of the certificates alongside me".

=== Seanad Éireann ===
Ó Donnghaile was elected to the Seanad (Irish senate) in 2016 and re-elected in 2020. In December 2023, he announced that he would resign from the Seanad for health reasons, and he did so on 22 January 2024.

In October 2024, he revealed that he was the Sinn Féin member who was suspended for sending inappropriate messages to two teenage males, aged 16 and 18, in September 2023. The Police Service of Northern Ireland was contacted; however, no formal complaint was received from anyone. In his statement, Ó Donnghaile acknowledged that his actions called for him to resign from the Seanad and from the party. In a statement published by The Irish News, he said: "This would also give me the space to focus on improving my health and wellbeing, issues that I have been dealing with my doctor on since mid-2021." On the same day, Sinn Féin leader Mary Lou McDonald told the Dáil that Ó Donnghaile resigned, following allegations of the sending of inappropriate messages to a 17-year-old male. In a letter published by the Sunday Independent on 20 October, the teenager said he was 16-years-old at the time, and called for McDonald's apology for the party's "disastrous handling" of his case, saying her tribute to Ó Donnghaile when he resigned was "like a mental stab".

Civic offices
Preceded by Pat Convery	Lord Mayor of Belfast; 2011–2012	Succeeded by Gavin Robinson
