= Jackson Orem =

Ugandan oncologist

- Born: Uganda
- Education: Makerere University (Bachelor of Medicine and Bachelor of Surgery) (Master of Medicine in Internal Medicine); Case Western Reserve University; Fellowship in Hematology & Oncology); Karolinska Institute (Doctor of Philosophy)
- Occupations: Physician; Oncologist; Researcher; Academic
- Years active: 2004–present
- Known for: Medical practice and oncology research
- Title: Director of the Uganda Cancer Institute

Jackson Orem is a Ugandan physician, oncologist and researcher. He has served as the director of the Uganda Cancer Institute, since 2004.

== Background and education ==
Orem was born in Uganda and he attended local primary and secondary schools. His father was a driver and salesman. His mother was a housewife. After high school, he was admitted to Makerere University School of Medicine, the oldest in East Africa. He graduated with a Bachelor of Medicine and Bachelor of Surgery (MBChB) degree. After internship, he was re-admitted to Makerere University to pursue a Master of Medicine degree (MMed), in Internal Medicine, graduating in the early 2000s.

In 2002, he left Uganda for Cleveland, Ohio, in the United States, to pursue a two-year Fellowship in hematology and oncology at Case Western Reserve University. After graduation in 2004, he returned to Uganda. Later, he was awarded a Doctor of Philosophy (PhD) degree by the Karolinska Institute in Solna, Stockholm County in Sweden.

== Career ==
In 2004, Orem returned to Uganda to head the Uganda Cancer Institute. He was the only trained, qualified oncologist in a country of 26 million people at that time. In the beginning his case load was in excess of 10,000 patients annually.

In 2004, he began collaborating with Dr. Corey Casper and others from the Fred Hutchinson Cancer Research Center (Fred Hutch), in Seattle, Washington, in the United States. That collaboration led to Fred Hutch offering two annual slots to MMed graduates from Uganda, to pursue two-year medical oncology fellowships in Seattle. Dr Victoria Walusansa, the first graduate of that program is now the Deputy Medical Director at Uganda Cancer Institute.

Dr Orem's research interests are in infection-related cancers, especially viral-related ones. He is also interested in the treatment of cancer in low resource settings.

== Other considerations ==
Dr Orem is a Senior Consultant in Oncology at the Uganda Ministry of Health. He is an honorary faculty member at Makerere University College of Health Sciences, and is an external faculty at the Fred Hutchinson Cancer Research Center. He is a member of the Non-Communicable Disease Technical working group of the Uganda Ministry of Health and chairs the adverse events and surveillance committee of the HPV vaccine program in the country.

Dr Orem is associate director of the UCI/Hutchison Cancer Center Alliance collaboration between the Uganda Cancer Institute and the Fred Hutchison Cancer Research Center. He is a member of the AIDS Malignancy Consortium (AMC), NCI international BL Clinical Care Committee and is the Principal Investigator for the AIDS Clinical Trial Group.

== See also ==
- Mulago National Referral Hospital
- Uganda Program on Cancer and Infectious Diseases
