= Gavin Robinson =

Northern Irish politician (born 1984)

The Right Honourable Gavin Robinson MP
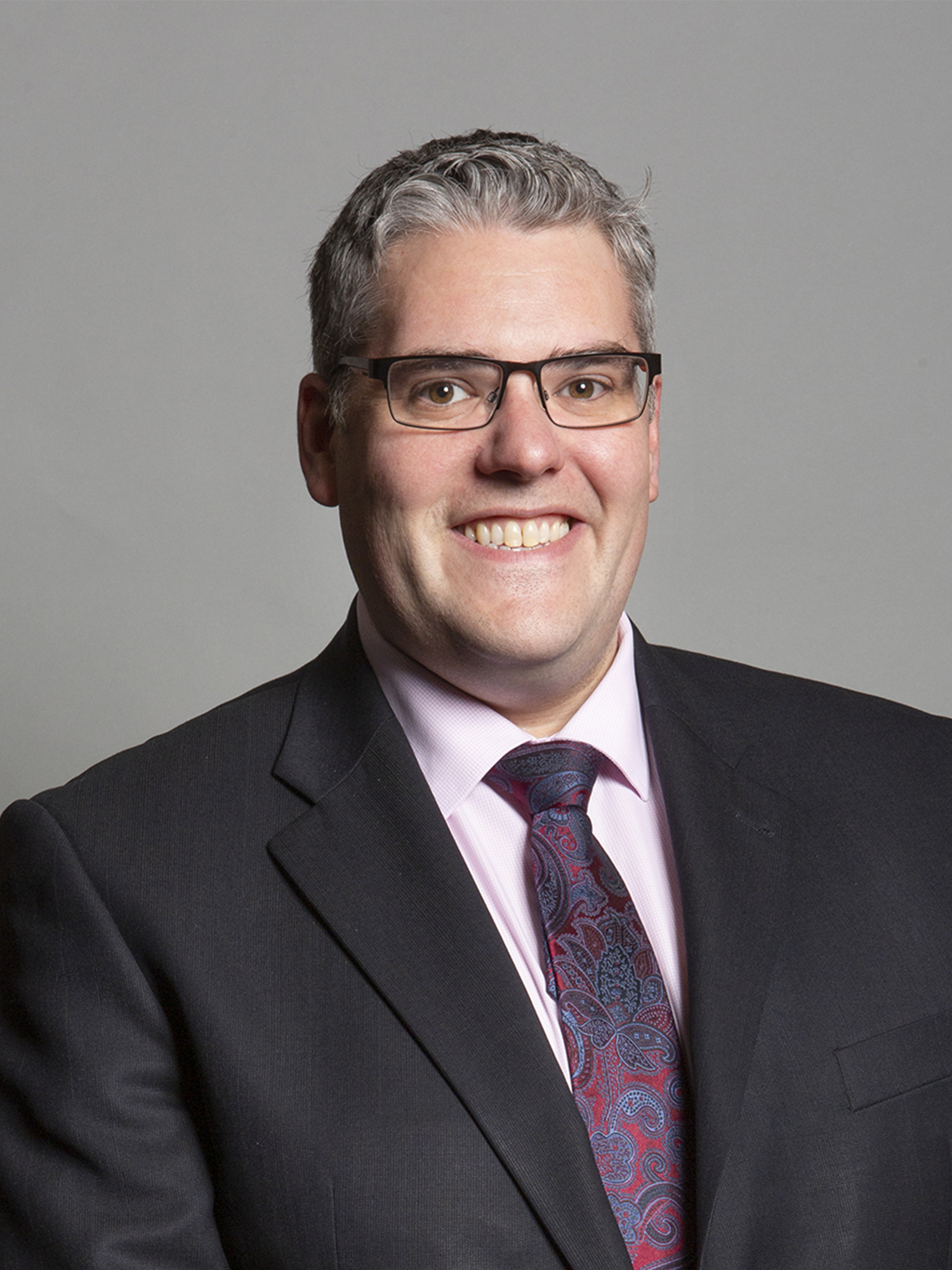
- Official portrait, 2019

Leader of the Democratic Unionist Party
- Incumbent
- Assumed office 29 May 2024 (Note: Interim leader from 29 March to 29 May 2024 following the resignation of Jeffrey Donaldson.)
- Deputy: Michelle McIlveen
- Preceded by: Jeffrey Donaldson

Leader of the Democratic Unionist Party in the House of Commons
- Incumbent
- Assumed office 29 March 2024
- Leader: Himself (Note: Interim: 29 March – 20 May 2024)
- Preceded by: Jeffrey Donaldson

Deputy Leader of the Democratic Unionist Party
- In office 9 June 2023 – 29 May 2024
- Leader: Jeffrey Donaldson; Himself
- Preceded by: Paula Bradley
- Succeeded by: Michelle McIlveen (2025)

Member of Parliament for Belfast East
- Incumbent
- Assumed office 7 May 2015
- Preceded by: Naomi Long
- Majority: 2,676 (6.2%)

69th Lord Mayor of Belfast
- In office 1 June 2012 – 1 June 2013
- Deputy: Tierna Cunningham
- Preceded by: Niall Ó Donnghaile
- Succeeded by: Máirtín Ó Muilleoir

Member of the Belfast City Council
- In office 1 March 2010 – 7 May 2015
- Preceded by: Sammy Wilson
- Succeeded by: Brian Kennedy
- Constituency: Pottinger (2010–2014); Titanic (2014–2015)

Personal details
- Born: Gavin James Robinson; 22 November 1984 (age 41) Belfast, Northern Ireland
- Party: Democratic Unionist Party
- Spouse: Lindsay Witherow (m. 2011)
- Children: 1
- Education: Ulster University (LLB); Queen's University (MA)
- Occupation: Politician; barrister

Gavin James Robinson (born 22 November 1984) is a Northern Irish unionist politician and barrister who has been serving as Leader of the Democratic Unionist Party (DUP) since March 2024. He served as Deputy DUP Leader from June 2023 to May 2024. He has been the Member of Parliament (MP) for Belfast East in the UK House of Commons since the 2015 general election. He was Lord Mayor of Belfast in 2012–2013. Robinson is the DUP Spokesperson for Defence and Home Affairs.

== Background ==
Gavin James Robinson was born on 22 November 1984 and grew up in the Stormont area of East Belfast. He has a brother and sister. He attended Grosvenor Grammar School in East Belfast, and then Ulster University, where he obtained a degree in law and government, before attending Queen's University Belfast, where he attained a masters in Irish politics. Robinson briefly worked as a children's entertainer before commencing practice as a barrister.

== Political career ==
=== Belfast City Council ===
Robinson was co-opted to Belfast City Council in March 2010 to replace Sammy Wilson in representing the Pottinger electoral area of South and East Belfast. He was returned to the council as an alderman in the 2011 local elections and elected Lord Mayor by the council for the year beginning 1 June 2012. He was a member of the East Belfast District Policing and Community Safety Partnership subgroup and represented the council on the boards of the Ulster Orchestra and the 2013 World Police and Fire Games held in Belfast. Robinson was elected for the successor Titanic District at the 2014 City Council election.

=== Parliamentary career ===
Ahead of the 2015 general election, Robinson was selected by the DUP as their candidate for Belfast East, standing against Naomi Long, deputy leader of the Alliance Party and the incumbent MP. He was endorsed by the Ulster Unionist Party, who stood aside as part of a pact with the DUP in which the two parties would not stand candidates against each other in four constituencies. Robinson unseated Long, receiving 49.3% of the vote, with a majority of 2,597. During his acceptance speech, he caused controversy by saying that the "last five long years are over", in relation to Long's term of office. He also said: "When people of East Belfast were asked to vote for a shared future, they chose to share that future with somebody they can trust, rather than back a party that are only interested in offering us a future if we share their view". He was criticised by Kyle Paisley, son of Ian Paisley, and David Ford, leader of the Alliance Party. Paisley said: "You'd think he would have had a bit more humility when he made his acceptance speech last night, but it was quite disgraceful in some parts." Long said: "Let's just say his party leader was more magnanimous in defeat than he was in victory. "At this stage in my political career, what the DUP say and do never comes as a shock to me." The following day, Robinson said he should have been more gracious towards Long, stating: "Set party politics aside, I think Naomi Long is a formidable politician. I didn't say it in my speech last night, as I say, I'm reflecting this morning as it's been long and difficult. There should have been scope for me to recognise her contribution."

Robinson was re-elected at the 2017 general election, taking 55.8% of the vote and increasing his majority to 8,474.

In March 2019, Robinson was one of 21 MPs who voted against LGBT-inclusive sex and relationship education in English schools. He is nevertheless considered a relatively liberal member of the DUP.

He retained his seat at the December 2019 general election with a majority of 1,819, following a strong performance from Long. Robinson became the only unionist MP in Belfast after party colleagues Nigel Dodds and Emma Little-Pengelly lost their seats.

In June 2023, Robinson put his name forward to be the next deputy leader of the DUP, following Paula Bradley's resignation. Jonathan Buckley, an MLA for Upper Bann, also ran for the position. After a vote of the party's MPs and MLAs, Robinson was announced as the new deputy leader on 9 June 2023. Following his election, he said: "I am honoured that I have been elected to serve as Deputy Leader. I look forward to continuing to work with colleagues at every level within the party as we seek to deliver on our election commitments. A new generation of unionists are stepping forward to serve at every level within our party and in service to Northern Ireland. We all share the desire to play our part to help shape Northern Ireland into an even better place to live and work."

His appointment to the His Majesty's Most Honourable Privy Council was announced on 28 March 2024 as part of the 2024 Special Honours.

=== Leader of the Democratic Unionist Party ===
The day after his appointment to the Privy Council, Robinson was appointed interim leader of the DUP, following Jeffrey Donaldson's resignation after being charged by the PSNI with rape and historic sex offences. He was ratified as DUP leader on 29 May 2024 after a meeting with the party's executive.

At the party's campaign launch for the July 2024 general election, Robinson said that Irish Sea border had not been removed, contradicting assurances Donaldson had given earlier in the year over the return of the Northern Ireland Executive. In Belfast East, Robinson and Long faced each other for the fourth consecutive election, in what was expected to be a close race due to boundary changes and historical tactical voting in the constituency. The presence of the rival Traditional Unionist Voice (TUV), who split the unionist vote the last time they stood in 2010, was expected to pose another challenge for Robinson. He was returned with an increased majority of 2,676 votes (6%), and a reduced share of 46.6%.

Following renewed tensions surrounding the Drumcree parade in September 2026, Robinson and DUP MP Carla Lockhart differed over the DUP's response to Sinn Féin First Minister Michelle O'Neill's participation in a protest on the Garvaghy Road. Lockhart called for the removal of Deputy First Minister Emma Little-Pengelly from the Northern Ireland Executive. Robinson opposed removing Little-Pengelly, stating that he believed such a move would be damaging for functioning of the devolved government.

On 23 October 2026, Lockhart resigned from her role as a DUP party officer. Following Lockhart's resignation from her role as party officer, Robinson sought to play down suggestions of a personal breakdown in their relationship. Appearing on Nolan Live on the evening of the 23rd of October, he remarked that he and Lockhart had shared a packet of Haribo sweets.

== Personal life ==
Robinson married Lindsay Witherow in 2011, and they have a son. They live in Dundonald, County Down. He is unrelated to former DUP leader and Belfast East MP Peter Robinson.

He is a member of the Church of Ireland.

== Notes ==
Civic offices
Preceded by Niall Ó Donnghaile	Lord Mayor of Belfast; 2012–2013	Succeeded by Máirtín Ó Muilleoir
Parliament of the United Kingdom
Preceded by Naomi Long	Member of Parliament for Belfast East; 2015–present	Incumbent
Party political offices
Preceded by Jeffrey Donaldson	Leader of the Democratic Unionist Party; 2024–present	Incumbent
