= List of high commissioners of the United Kingdom to Samoa =

British High Commissioner to Samoa
- Coat of Arms of the United Kingdom
- Incumbent; David Ward since December 2019
- Style: His Excellency
- Residence: Apia
- Appointer: Charles III
- Website: High Commission – Samoa

The high commissioner of the United Kingdom to Samoa is the United Kingdom's foremost diplomatic representative to the Independent State of Samoa, and in charge of the UK's diplomatic mission in Samoa.

As Samoa and the United Kingdom are fellow members of the Commonwealth of Nations, diplomatic relations between them are at government level rather than between heads of state. Thus, the countries exchange high commissioners rather than ambassadors.

== History ==
The British Government opened its high commission in Apia in 2019. Previously British interests in Samoa were represented by the British high commissioner to New Zealand who was also accredited as high commissioner to Samoa.

== List of heads of mission ==
=== High commissioners to Samoa ===
- 2006–2010: George Fergusson (non-resident)
- 2010–2014: Victoria Treadell (non-resident)
- 2014–2017: Jonathan Sinclair (non-resident)
- 2018–2019: Laura Clarke (non-resident)
- 2019–2023: David Ward
- 2023–2026: Gareth Hoar
- 2026-: Andrew Nethercott
