= Edward Katongole-Mbidde =

- Born: Uganda
- Education: Makerere University (Bachelor of Medicine and Bachelor of Surgery) (Master of Medicine in Internal Medicine); Royal College of Physicians (Member of the Royal College of Physicians of the United Kingdom)
- Occupations: Physician; Researcher; Academic
- Years active: 1974–present
- Known for: Medical research
- Title: Immediate Past Director of the Uganda Virus Research Institute

Edward Katongole-Mbidde is a prominent Ugandan physician, academic, medical oncologist and researcher. He is the immediate past executive director of Uganda Virus Research Institute. He earned his Bachelor of Medicine and Bachelor of Surgery (MBChB) and Master of Medicine (MMed) in Internal Medicine from Makerere University.

== Early life and education ==
Edward Katongole trained at Makerere University Medical School where he earned his Bachelor of Medicine and Bachelor of Surgery (MBChB) degree and later a Master of Medicine (MMed) in Internal Medicine.

== Medical career ==
Mbidde began working at the Uganda Cancer Institute (UCI) in May 1974. He rose to leadership positions as the institute faced the emerging HIV/AIDS epidemic and its associated cancer like Kaposi's sarcoma and Burkitt's lymphoma. In the early 1980s, plans were made for Mbidde to begin leading efforts at the UCI alongside his predecessor, Charles Olweny. However, in 1982, Olweny suddenly left Uganda, went into exile and joined the World Health Organization in Zambia. Mbidde took over as director without a formal handover of leadership. From 1982 through 2004, Katongole-Mbidde was the sole oncologist in the only cancer center in Uganda. He served as the executive director of the Uganda Cancer Institute (UCI) until 2004.

== Scientific contributions ==
Dr. Katongole Mbidde has co-authored numerous peer-reviewed publications on topics in oncology and infectious diseases like, Kaposi's sarcoma in children in Uganda through providing key clinical insights into relationship between HIV and childhood Malignancies.

Studies on Burkitt's lymphoma one of the most common childhood cancers in equatorial Africa, contributing to long-term clinical follow-up and treatment experience documetation.

Research on intestinal parasites in Kaposi's sarcoma patients exploring interactions between parasitic infections and cancer incidence in Uganda.

== Leadership ==
In addition to his institutional leadership role, Dr. Katongole Mbidde has served on national research and science governance bodies, including as Chairperson of the National HIV/AIDS Research Committee under the Uganda National Council for Science and Technology (UNCST).

== See also ==
- Uganda Cancer Institute
- Makerere University School of Medicine
