= Volker Beckers =

German Business Executive

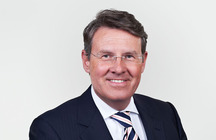
- Born: Volker Bernd Beckers; May 22, 1964 (age 62)
- Education: University of Cologne(MBA)
- Occupation: Group CEO RWE Npower 2010-2012

Volker Bernd Beckers, CBE (born 22 May 1964) is a German business executive, and a former Group CEO of RWE npower.

He is currently Non-Executive Chairman of Cornwall Insight, Non-Executive Chairman of Foresight Metering, Honorary Chairman of Energy Live News, and Non-Executive Director of the Nuclear Authority Board, and holds positions on several other boards and organisations.

== Early life ==
He attended the University of Cologne (Universität zu Köln).

After graduating with a master's degree in business administration, he worked for Compunet Computer AG (later Computacenter) as Head of the Training and Education Centre and then moved to the management consultancy part of the business as Division Manager responsible for Project Management methods and IT Development Projects.

== Career ==
Prior to joining RWE npower, he was Vice President Corporate Controlling and Development at RWE Net AG in Dortmund, and from February 2003 was also responsible for organisational development. Before that, he held several senior positions at RWE Energy AG. His last position before the merger with VEW Energy AG was Head of Controlling business unit grid in Essen.

=== RWE npower ===
Volker Beckers was RWE npower's Group CFO from 2003 to 2009. In January 2010 he became chief executive. Volker was Group CEO of RWE Npower plc until the end of 2012.

Whilst at the Big Six company, he successfully oversaw substantial investment in the UK generation fleet, with the completion of two efficient gas-fired power stations – Staythorpe and Pembroke – as well as its customer service platform and the sale of Horizon Nuclear Power.

In 2012 it was announced that RWE npower would start commercial operations of its 2,000 megawatt (MW) gas-fired power station at Pembroke.

Npower had already announced that the 1 billion pound ($1.6 billion) combined cycle gas turbine (CCGT) power station would become operational during the third quarter of 2012 but had not cited a specific month.

“With the full commercial operation of our new 1 billion pounds power station in Pembrokeshire next month ... RWE npower now has the largest and most efficient fleet of flexible gas-fired power stations in the country,” Volker Beckers, group CEO RWE npower said at the presentation of its second-quarter results.

For his efforts as a leader in the industry he has been recognised in 2012 with the Supreme Award for “outstanding contribution to the industry” and as the first Executive Director of the UK energy sector.

Commenting on his award, Volker Beckers said: “I am honoured to have been recognised for my contributions to the industry. There are a lot of challenges and changes ahead for energy in the UK and further afield, but having seen the hard work, dedication and innovation of those working in the sector on a day-to-day basis, I have no doubt the industry will rise to meet them.”

=== Non-executive and Representative Roles ===
In addition to his role at RWE Npower, Volker Beckers has held a number of representative roles, including deputy chairman of the Executive Commercial Management Committee at BDEW (German Association of Energy and Water Industries), the UK industry body for the energy sector (Energy UK), and also represented the German and UK companies at Eurelectric's "Finance & Economics" Focus Group.

He is member of King's College advisory board at the European Centre for Energy and Resource Security (EUCERS) and was Councilor of the German-British Chamber of Industry & Commerce. He is also a member of The Worshipful Company of the Fuellers and Fellow of the Energy Institute (FEI), London. He became “Honorary Vice-President and Advisory Board Member“ at the Energy and Utility Forum in 2015.

In 2017 Volker Beckers became Honorary Chairman of Energy Live News.

In October 2018, Volker Beckers became the chair of energy tech start-up, Piclo, applying his industry expertise to facilitating the growth of its flexibility marketplace that enables Distribution System Operators (DSO) to procure flex and other ‘smart’ energy services.

== Personal life ==
He is married with two children.

Business positions
Preceded by	Chief Executive of RWE npower January 2010 - November 2012	Succeeded by Paul Massara
Preceded by	Finance Director of RWE npower November 2003 – December 2009	Succeeded by
