= Uganda Cancer Institute =

- Uganda Ministry of Health & Fred Hutchinson Cancer Research Center
- Location within Kampala

Geography
- Location: Mulago, Kampala, Central Region, Uganda
- Coordinates: 00°20′29″N 32°34′40″E

Organisation
- Care system: Public
- Type: Cancer Treatment, Research and Teaching

Services
- Beds: 100

History
- Founded: 1967; 59 years ago

Links
- Website: www.uci.or.ug
- Other links: List of hospitals in Uganda; Medical education in Uganda

Uganda Cancer Institute (UCI) is a public, specialized, tertiary care medical facility owned by the Uganda Ministry of Health. Located in the Ugandan capital Kampala, the institute is designated as East Africa's Centre of Excellence in Oncology. In collaboration with Makerere University College of Health Sciences, UCI plans to start offering master's degrees, doctoral programs and post-doctoral fellowships in oncology care.

== Location ==
The facility is located along Upper Mulago Hill Road, on Mulago Hill, in the Kawempe Division of Kampala, about 4.5 kilometres (2.8 mi) north of the central business district of the city.

== Overview ==
UCI is a cancer treatment, research, and teaching center, affiliated with the Makerere University School of Medicine and with the Mulago National Referral Hospital, the teaching hospital for the medical school. UCI maintains an inpatient facility with a capacity of 80 beds. It attends to an average of about 200 patients daily.

In October 2011, ground was broken for a three-story, integrated cancer training, research, and treatment facility, measuring nearly 16,700 square feet (1,550 m^{2}). The new building, called the "UCI-Fred Hutch Cancer Centre," is jointly operated by the UCI and the Fred Hutchinson Cancer Center in Seattle, Washington, US as part of the UCI-Fred Hutch Collaboration. In May 2015, the completed facility opened and began attending to patients. In November 2020, the UCI-Fred Hutch Collaboration completed the construction of the new ground-level of the facility, which houses administrative offices and a biorepository.

== Cancer burden ==
As of August 2024, it was reported that over a 5-year period, an average of 35,968 new cancer cases were diagnosed in Uganda every year. Also every year, on average, 24,629 people died from their cancer diagnoses. Another 77,028 patients, on average, live with their cancers in the country.

Between 1 January 2017 and 31 December 2022, the leading cancers in women in Uganda were (1) Cervical cancer (2) Breast cancer (3) Stomach cancer (4) Esophageal cancer and (5) Liver cancer. During the same time, the leading cancers in men in Uganda were (1) Prostate cancer (2) Kaposi's sarcoma (3) Liver cancer and (4) Lymphoma.

== History ==
UCI was founded in 1967 with twenty beds, as the Lymphoma Treatment Center, to treat childhood lymphomas, predominantly Burkitt's lymphoma, the most common childhood lymphoma in Uganda and endemic to tropical Africa. In 1969, UCI expanded to a total of 40 beds, when the Solid Tumor Center was added to focus research on Kaposi's sarcoma and liver cancer. "During the 1960s and early 1970s, UCI was a leading international medical research center, in its areas of specialization. UCI established collaboration with the National Cancer Institute (NCI) in Bethesda, Maryland."

In 1972, following the expulsion of Ugandan Asians by dictator Idi Amin, nearly all of NCI's scientists left. Professor Charles Olweny, a Uganda researcher, interrupted his studies at NCI in the US and returned to become the first Ugandan director of UCI. In 1982, following the overthrow of Idi Amin, Olweny was forced to leave Uganda for security reasons, leaving leadership of UCI in the hands of Professor Edward Katongole-Mbidde. When Katongole-Mbidde left UCI to become the director at the Uganda Virus Research Institute in 1995, Dr. Jackson Orem took over the helm at UCI. Between 2011 and 2015, the bed capacity at the institute was increased to 80.

As of September 2023, UCI's bed capacity was reported to be 100 in-patient beds, of which 75 are general and 25 are for private, paying patients. At that time, a new 360-bed inpatient facility was under construction to accommodate an increased influx of patients. Since the beginning of 2023, there has been a significant increase in private patients, who previously were seeking cancer care outside the country. The patient influx is attributed to better services and care, including the availability of oncology medications, the availability of a medical LINAC machine to precisely guide radiation therapy and an increased number of oncology physicians and nurses.

== International collaboration ==
The international research centers with collaborative projects with Uganda Cancer Institute include, but are not limited to the following:

1. National Cancer Institute – Bethesda, Maryland, US
2. Fred Hutchinson Cancer Research Center – Seattle, Washington, US
3. Case Western Reserve University – Cleveland, Ohio, US

=== Uganda Program on Cancer and Infectious Diseases ===
The Uganda Program on Cancer and Infectious Diseases (UPCID), established in 2004, is a joint program between Fred Hutchinson Cancer Research Center in Seattle and the Uganda Cancer Institute. The program works to understand and treat infection-related cancers in the United States and abroad.

The collaboration was founded by Corey Casper, a physician-scientist at the Fred Hutchinson Cancer Center and Jackson Orem, director of the Uganda Cancer Institute.

It received additional funding in October 2009, when the United States Agency for International Development awarded a US$500,000 grant to the Fred Hutchinson Cancer Center to aid in the construction of the first United States cancer clinic and medical-training facility in Africa.

== Brachytherapy ==
In 2016, the institute installed a "Flexitron Cobalt-60 High Dose Rate" brachytherapy system from Elekta. The system is part of a two-year renovation plan that UCI is implementing at a cost of US$49 million.

== Teletherapy ==
In March 2016, the "Cobalt-60 Teletherapy" unit at UCI, which had been in use for the previous 20 years, broke down. Efforts to acquire a replacement unit are underway, with installation expected in 2018. In the interim, the Uganda Ministry of Health has arranged with the Aga Khan University Hospital in Nairobi, Kenya, to offer teletherapy to some Ugandan patients.

A brand new teletherapy machine, manufactured in the Czech Republic, arrived in Uganda in August 2017. The machine was purchased at a cost of €642,000 (more than UShs2.7 billion), contributed by the government of Uganda and the International Atomic Energy Agency (IAEA). It is expected that installation of the new machine will take at least one month. Following installation and testing of the new machine, the institution started treating patients using the new telepathy machine on 4 December 2017 and officially commissioned it on 19 January 2018.

In February 2020, UCI commissioned a new Bhabhatron II Cancer Therapy Machine, donated to Uganda by the government of India. This machine, which also uses Cobalt 60 as the source of radiation will supplement the one acquired two years earlier from the Czech Republic. The new unit was installed by Indian technicians. A group of Ugandan oncologists and technicians were earlier sent to India to train on how to operate the new machine. Also in 2018, Samta Memorial Foundation, an Indian-based non-government organization donated a mobile mammography unit that is now in use at UCI.

In October 2023, Madhusudan Agrawal, Uganda's honorary council to India, based in Mumbai donated a second mobile cancer screening van to UCI. This is in addition to the mobile mammography van donated by the same person in 2018. The new diagnostic vehicle is expected in Uganda in December 2023.

== PET scanners ==
In September 2026 UCI acquired the first of three PET scanners. The scanners are expected to ease the diagnosis and staging of some cancers. This is anticipated to reduce the numbers of Ugandan patients who seek these specialised services outside the country. It is reported that the three PET scanners and one cyclotron cost UGX: 180 billion (approx. US$45,947, 000). The first machine arrived in Uganda in September 2026. During Q4 2026, it will go through installation and testing. It is expected to be available to serve patients in Q1 2027.

== Medical directors ==
The following medical researchers have served as director of UCI since its founding in 1967:

1. John Ziegler – American: 1967–1972
2. Charles Olweny – Ugandan: 1972–1982
3. Edward Katongole-Mbidde – Ugandan: 1982–1995
4. Jackson Orem – Ugandan: 1995–Present

== See also ==
- Nsambya Hospital Cancer Center
- Arua Regional Cancer Centre
- Gulu Regional Cancer Centre
- Mbale Regional Cancer Centre
- Mbarara Regional Cancer Centre
