= Abse =

Abse is a surname, and may refer to:

- Dannie Abse (1923–2014), Welsh writer and physician
- Joan Abse (1926–2005), English art historian
- Leo Abse (1917–2008), Welsh politician
- Tobias Abse, British historian and professor
- Wilfred Abse (1915–2005), Welsh psychiatrist
