= List of MPs for constituencies in Wales (1955–1959) =

This is a list of members of Parliament (MPs) elected to the House of Commons of the United Kingdom by Welsh constituencies for the Forty-First Parliament of the United Kingdom (1955–1959).

Most MPs elected for Welsh constituencies at the 1955 United Kingdom general election, held on 26 May 1955, served a full term, but there were three by-elections.

The list is sorted by the name of the MP.

== Composition ==
Affiliation	Members
Welsh Labour Party	27
Welsh Conservative Party	5
Welsh Liberal Party	3
National Liberal	1
Total	36

== List ==
MP	Constituency	Party	In constituency since
Aneurin Bevan	Ebbw Vale	Labour Party	1929
Nigel Birch	West Flintshire	Conservative Party	1950
Roderic Bowen	Cardiganshire	Liberal Party	1945
James Callaghan	Cardiff South East	Labour Party	1945
William Cove	Abervaon	Labour Party	1929
Clement Davies	Montgomeryshire	Liberal Party	1929
S. O. Davies	Merthyr Tydfil	Labour Party	1934 by-election
Desmond Donnelly	Pembrokeshire	Labour Party	1950
Ness Edwards	Caerphilly	Labour Party	1939 by-election
Garner Evans	Denbigh	National Liberal	1950
Harold Finch	Bedwellty	Labour Party	1950
Raymond Gower	Barry	Conservative Party	1951
David Grenfell	Gower	Labour Party	1922
Jim Griffiths	Llanelli	Labour Party	1936 by-election
Cledwyn Hughes	Anglesey	Labour Party	1951
Idwal Jones	Wrexham	Labour Party	1955
Thomas Jones	Merioneth	Labour Party	1951
David Llewellyn	Cardiff North	Conservative Party	1950
William Mainwaring	Rhondda East	Labour Party	1933 by-election
Percy Morris	Swansea West	Labour Party	1945
Rhys Hopkin Morris	Carmarthen	Liberal Party	1945
David Mort	Swansea East	Labour Party	1940 by-election
Walter Padley	Ogmore	Labour Party	1950
Arthur Pearson	Pontypridd	Labour Party	1938 by-election
Arthur Probert	Aberdare	Labour Party	1954 by-election
Goronwy Roberts	Caernarfon	Labour Party	1950
Peter Freeman	Newport	Labour Party	1945
George Thomas	Cardiff West	Labour Party	1945
Iorwerth Thomas	Rhondda West	Labour Party	1950
Peter Thomas	Conwy	Conservative Party	1951
Peter Thorneycroft	Monmouth	Conservative Party	1945 by-election
Tudor Watkins	Brecon and Radnor	Labour Party	1945
Granville West	Pontypool	Labour Party	1946 by-election
D. J. Williams	Neath	Labour Party	1945 by-election
Llywelyn Williams	Abertillery	Labour Party	1950 by-election
Eirene White	East Flintshire	Labour Party	1950

== By-elections ==
There were three by-elections during this period:

By-election	Date	Incumbent	Party	Winner	Party	Cause
Newport	6 July 1956	Peter Freeman	Labour	Frank Soskice	Labour	Death
Carmarthen	28 February 1957	Rhys Hopkin Morris	Liberal	Megan Lloyd George	Labour	Death
Pontypool	10 November 1958	Granville West	Labour	Leo Abse	Labour	Elevation to a life peerage

== See also ==
- 1955 United Kingdom general election
