= Lily Tobias =

Welsh writer and activist (1887–1984)

- Born: Lily Shepherd; 1887; Swansea, Wales
- Died: 1984 (aged 96–97); Haifa, Israel
- Occupations: Writer, activist
- Relatives: Dannie Abse (nephew); Leo Abse (nephew)

Lily Shepherd Tobias (1887–1984) was a Welsh writer and activist for suffrage, labour, peace, and a Jewish national home in Palestine. She wrote four novels, short stories, and plays.

Tobias was born in Swansea to Polish-Jewish immigrants. She campaigned for women's suffrage, the rights of conscientious objectors, and workers' rights. She was a Zionist, joining first the Foundation of Women Zionists of Great Britain, and later the Women's International Zionist Organization. In the 1930s, Tobias moved to Mandatory Palestine. In 1984, she died in Haifa.

== Early life ==
Lily Shepherd was born in Swansea, to Tobias Shepherd (born Tevia Rudinsky) and Chana Beila Shepherd. She grew up in Ystalyfera in the Swansea Valley. Her parents were Polish-Jewish immigrants, and the family spoke Yiddish at home.

Her father had a business selling wallpaper and glass decor items. Her brothers Isaac, Solomon, and Joseph were all arrested and jailed as conscientious objectors during World War I. Another brother, Moss, was arrested and jailed for lying about his age to avoid military service.

== Career ==
Tobias wrote articles for Llais Llafur, a Welsh socialist newspaper, in 1904. campaigned for women's suffrage, conscientious objectors, the rights of working people and a Jewish national home in Palestine. She served on the executive council of the Foundation of Women Zionists of Great Britain, and was active in the Women's International Zionist Organization while she lived in Palestine.

Tobias wrote four novels and a collection of short stories. Her adaptation of George Eliot's Daniel Deronda for the stage, the first such adaptation, was performed in London in 1927 and 1929, the later cast including Sybil Thorndike, Marie Ney, and Esme Percy. Her novel My Mother's House (1931) is about a Jewish Welshman who moves to Palestine. Eunice Fleet (1933) is about conscientious objectors during World War I. "Miss Tobias's imagination... is young and exuberant and romantic," commented a reviewer about Tube (1935), a novel set on the London Underground. "But she can write individual scenes on occasion surprisingly well, and some of her character drawing would not disgrace a more realistic story."

Two of her novels have been reprinted by Honno Press, which also published a biography of Tobias by Jasmine Donahaye in 2015.

== Published works ==
- The Nationalists (short stories)
- My Mother's House (1931)
- Eunice Fleet (1933)
- Tube (1935)
- The Samaritan (1939)

== Personal life ==
Lily Shepherd married Philip Valentine Tobias in 1911, and the couple emigrated to Mandatory Palestine in the 1930s. She was widowed in 1938, when Philip Tobias was fatally stabbed. She lived for a time in South Africa. She died in 1984, aged 96 years, in Haifa, Israel.

Tobias's nephews included poet Dannie Abse, psychoanalyst Wilfred Abse, and Labour MP Leo Abse.
