= 1955 United Kingdom general election in Wales =

- 26 May 1955

All 36 Welsh seats to the House of Commons
- Turnout: 79.6% (▼4.8 pp)
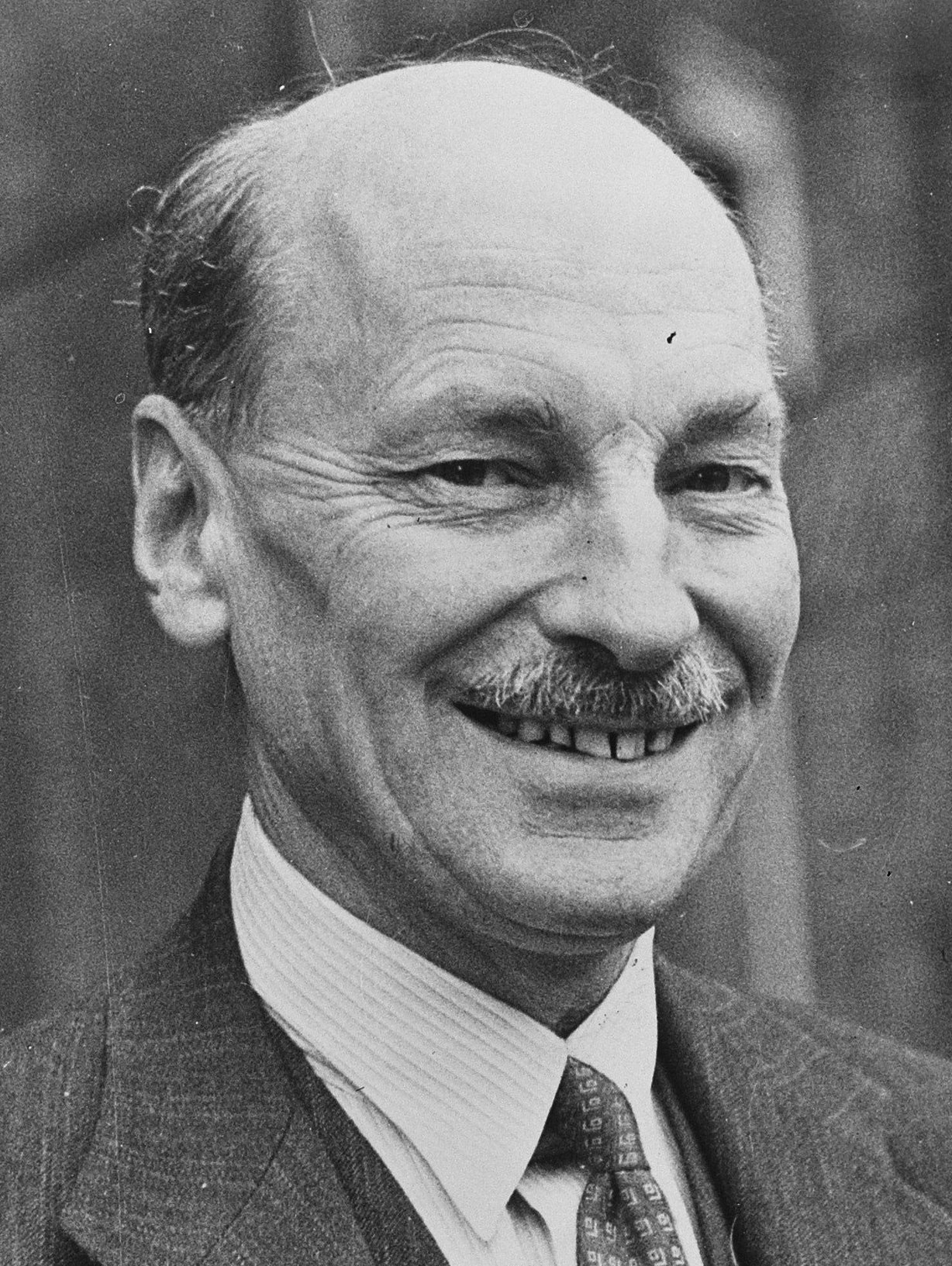

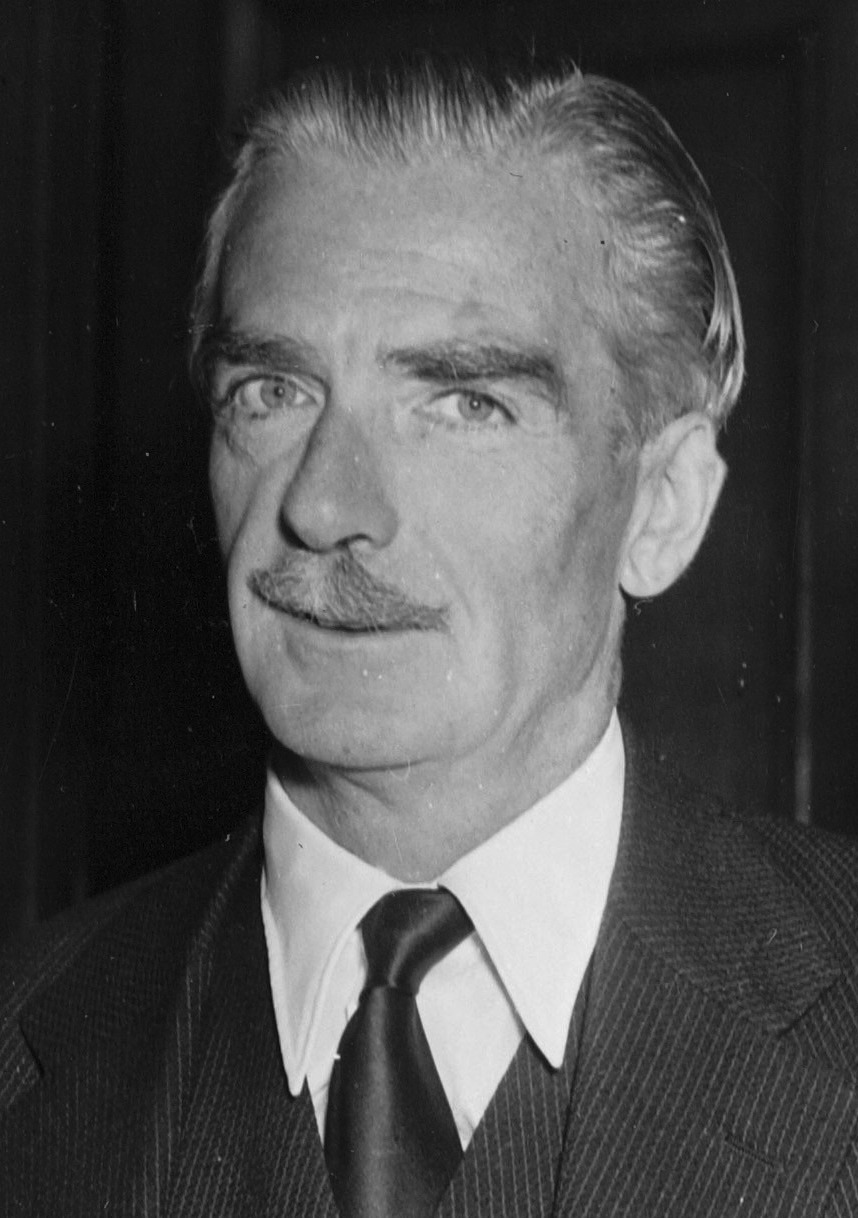

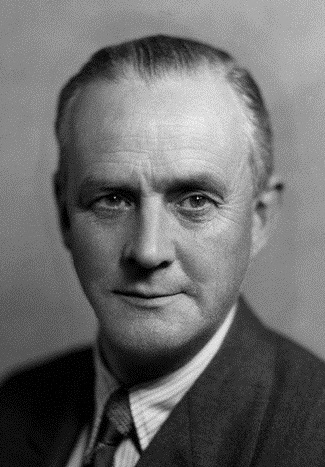
	First party	Second party	Third party
Leader	Clement Attlee	Anthony Eden	Clement Davies
Party	Labour	Conservative	Liberal
Leader since	25 October 1935	7 April 1955	2 August 1945
Leader's seat	Walthamstow West	Warwick and Leamington	Montgomeryshire
Last election	27 seats, 60.5%	6 seats, 30.8%	3 seats, 7.6%
Seats won	27	6	3
Seat change	Steady	Steady	Steady
Popular vote	825,690	428,866	104,095
Percentage	57.6%	29.9%	7.3%
Swing	▼2.9 pp	▼0.9 pp	▼0.3 pp

On Thursday 26 May 1955, the 1955 United Kingdom general election was held in Wales, to elect all 630 members of the House of Commons, with 36 constituencies being in Wales. The election saw the Labour party win the most votes and seats in Wales, retaining its overall 27 seats.

The changes in Wales were very minor during the election, with no seats changing compared to 1951.

It was the first of 18 general elections held under the reign of Queen Elizabeth II and the first general election whose television coverage is existent. It was the first election under the first periodic review of Westminster constituencies, the first review following the Initial Review of Westminster constituencies, however it did not change any seats in Wales. At the same time, it was the fifth and the last election in which the Labour Party was led by Clement Attlee.

== Candidates ==
Below is a table summarising the candidates of the 1955 general election in Wales.

Affiliation	Candidates
Labour Party	36
Conservative and Unionist Party	28
Plaid Cymru	11
Liberal Party	10
National Liberal Party	4
Communist Party of Great Britain	1 (Note: Candidate Annie Powell stood in Rhondda East.)
Independent	1 (Note: Candidate William L. Davies stood in Pembrokeshire.)
Total	91

== Results ==
Below is a table summarising the results of the 1955 general election in Wales.

Party	Seats					Aggregate votes		
Party	Total	Gains	Losses	Net	Of total (%)	Total	Of total (%)	Change (%)
Labour	27	0	0	Steady	75.0	825,690	57.6	▼2.9
Conservative (Total)	6	0	0	Steady	16.7	428,866	29.9	▼0.9
Conservative	5	0	0	Steady	13.9	383,132	26.7	▼0.9
National Liberal	1	0	0	Steady	2.8	45,734	3.2	▼0.1
Liberal	3	0	0	Steady	8.3	104,095	7.3	▼0.3
Plaid Cymru	0	0	0	Steady	—	45,119	3.1	▲2.4
Independent	0	Did not stand in 1951			—	25,410	1.8	—N/a
Communist	0	0	0	Steady	—	4,544	0.3	▲0.1
Total	36			0	100.0	1,433,724	100.0	0.0
Registered voters, and turnout						1,801,217	79.6	▼4.8

Popular vote
Labour	57.6%
Conservative	29.9%
Liberal	7.3%
Plaid Cymru	3.1%
Independent	1.8%
Communist	0.3%

Parliament seats
Labour	75.0%
Conservative	16.7%
Liberal	8.3%

== See also ==
- 1955 United Kingdom general election in England
- 1955 United Kingdom general election in Scotland
- 1955 United Kingdom general election in Northern Ireland
- List of MPs for constituencies in Wales (1955–1959)
