= 1955 United Kingdom general election in Scotland =

- 26 May 1955

All 71 Scottish seats to the House of Commons
- Turnout: 75.1% (▼1.2 pp)
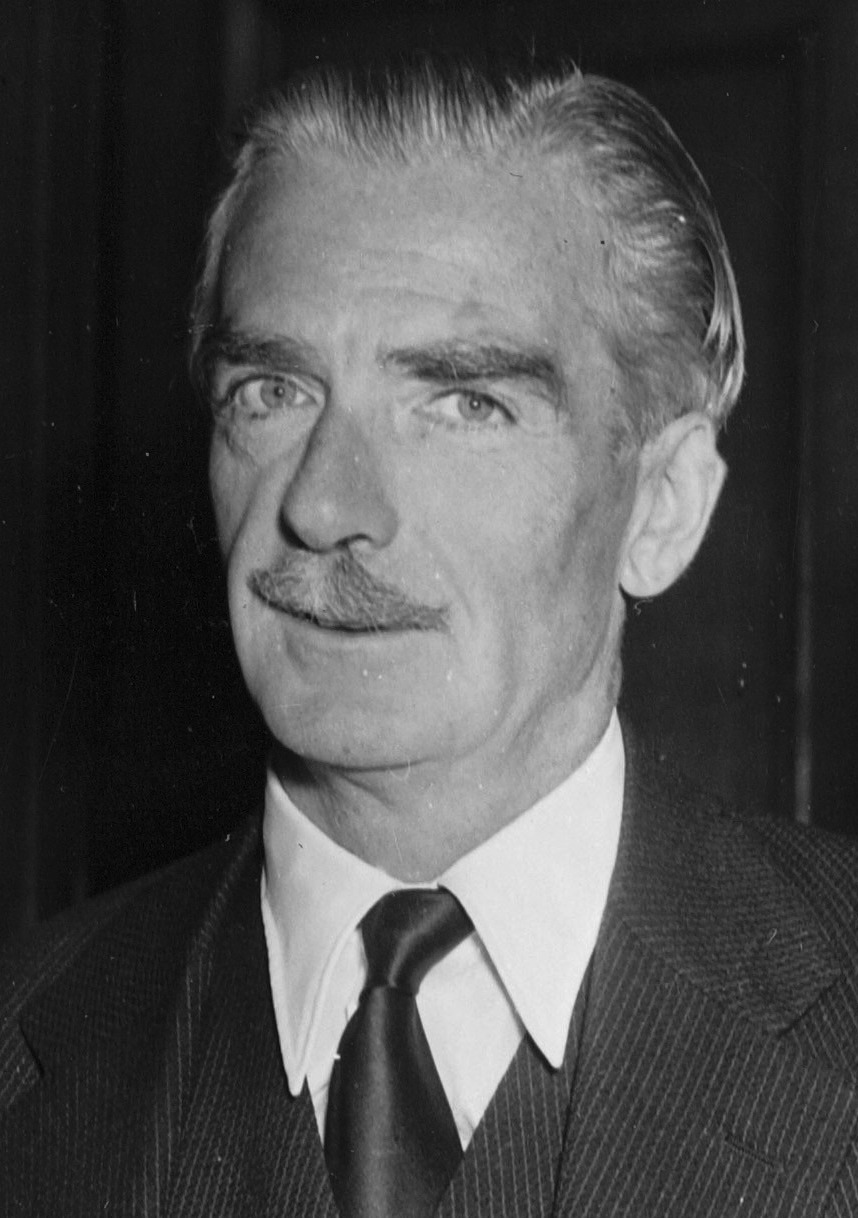

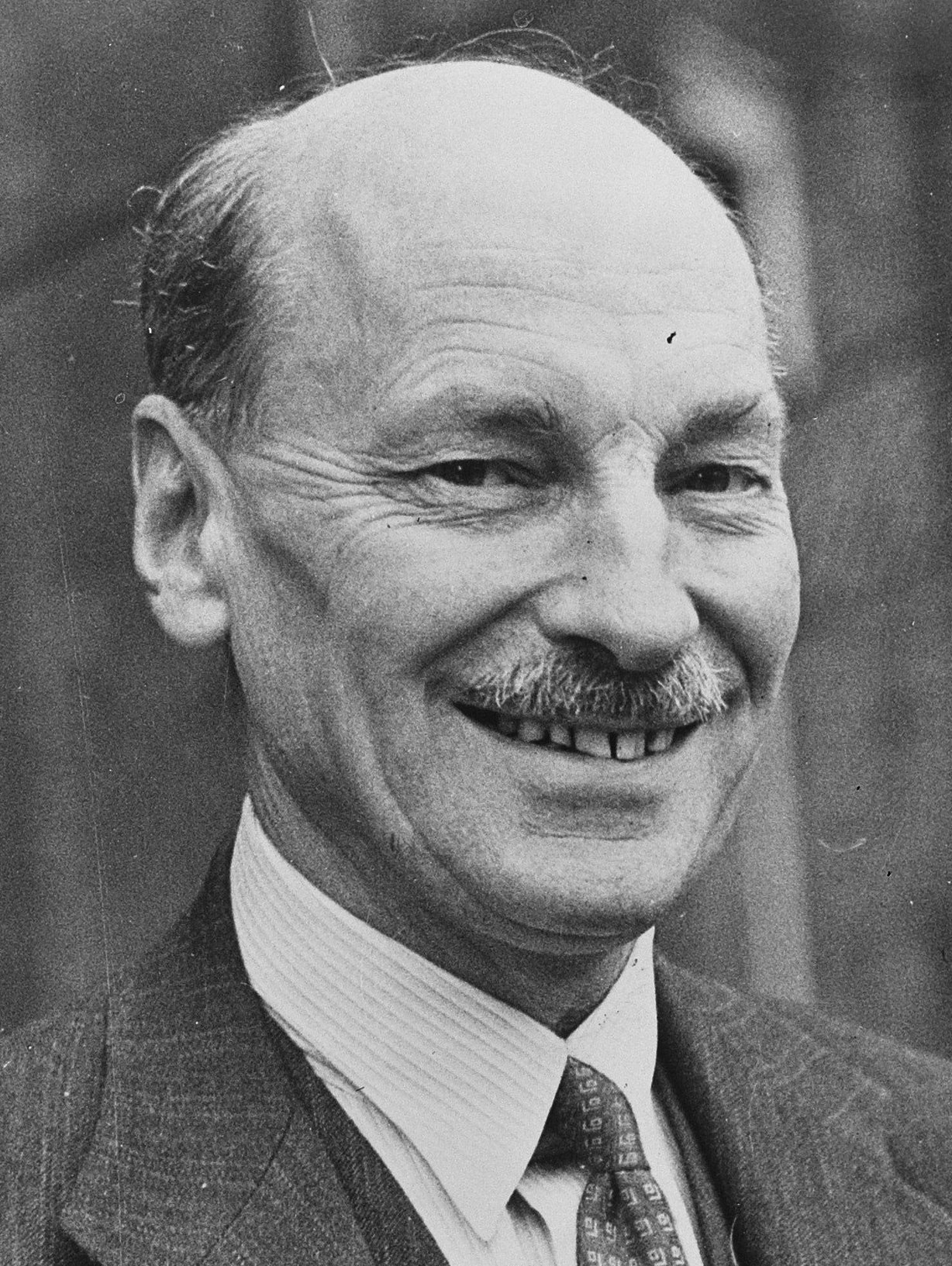

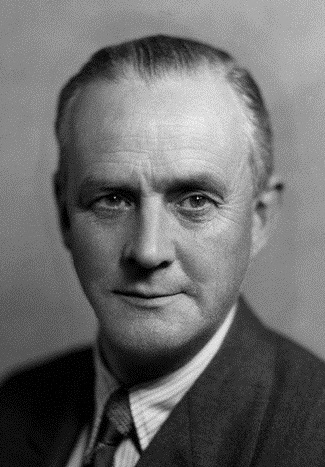
	First party	Second party	Third party
Leader	Anthony Eden	Clement Attlee	Clement Davies
Party	Unionist	Labour	Liberal
Alliance	Conservative		Liberal
Leader since	7 April 1955	25 October 1935	2 August 1945
Leader's seat	Warwick and Leamington	Walthamstow West	Montgomeryshire
Last election	35 seats, 48.6%	35 seats, 47.9%	1 seat, 2.7%
Seats won	36 (Note: The seat and vote count figures for the Unionists given here include the National Liberals)	34	1
Seat change	▲1	▼1	Steady
Popular vote	1,273,942	1,188,058	47,273
Percentage	50.1%	46.7%	1.9%
Swing	▲1.5 pp	▼1.2 pp	▼0.8 pp

On Thursday 26 May 1955, the 1955 United Kingdom general election was held in Scotland, to elect all 630 seats of the House of Commons, with 71 constituencies being in Scotland.

The election was the first of 18 general elections held under the reign of Queen Elizabeth II, the fifth and the last election in which the Labour Party was led by Clement Attlee, and the first general election for which television coverage remains in existence. It was the first election under the first periodic review of Westminster constituencies, the first review following the Initial Review of Westminster constituencies.

== Candidates ==
Below is a table summarising the candidates of the 1951 general election in Scotland.

Affiliation	Candidates
Labour Party	71
Unionist Party	59
National Liberal Party	12
Liberal Party	5
Communist Party of Great Britain	5
Scottish National Party	2
Independent Liberal	1 (Note: Candidate Andrew Murray stood in Edinburgh Leith.)
Independent Labour Party	1 (Note: Candidate George Stone stood in Glasgow Bridgeton.)
Total	156

== Analysis ==
The election is often cited as the only time since the Second World War that one party has achieved a majority of the Scottish vote, and the last election at which the Conservative and Unionist Party returned a majority vote from Scotland: candidates supporting the Conservative government of Anthony Eden received 50.1% of the vote and 36 of Scotland's 71 seats at Westminster.

Six of the government's MPs were returned that year under the label of National Liberal and Conservatives, with the remainder being returned under the Unionist label under the national affiliation with the Conservative Party. The election predated the 1965 merger of the Unionists and Conservatives by a decade, whilst the National Liberals did not formally join with the Conservatives until 1967. Nonetheless as of 1955 all three parties remained separate entities, albeit closely associated. The National Liberal Party retained its seats of Dumfriesshire, East Fife, South Angus, North Angus and Mearns, West Renfrewshire and Ross and Cromarty.

Labour lost Central Ayrshire to the Unionist Party, but gained Glasgow Govan. The Unionist Party also won the newly created constituency of Glasgow Craigton, which was nominally held by Labour. Jo Grimond of the Liberal Party retained his very safe seat of Orkney and Shetland. Grimond would go onto become the leader of the Liberal Party the following year.

== Results ==
Party	Seats					Aggregate votes		
Party	Total	Gains	Losses	Net	Of total (%)	Total	Of total (%)	Change (%)
Unionist (Total)	36	2	1	▲1	50.7	1,273,942	50.1	▲1.5
Unionist	30	2	1	▲1	42.3	1,056,209	41.5	▲1.6
National Liberal	6	0	0	Steady	8.4	217,733	8.6	▼0.1
Labour Party	34	1	2	▼1	47.9	1,188,058	46.7	▼1.2
Liberal	1	0	0	Steady	1.4	47,273	1.9	▼0.8
Communist	0	0	0	Steady	—	13,195	0.5	▲0.1
SNP	0	0	0	Steady	—	12,112	0.5	▲0.2
Independent Liberal	0	Did not stand in 1951			—	6,055	0.2	—N/a
Ind. Labour Party	0	0	0	Steady	—	2,619	0.1	Steady
Total	71			Steady	100.0	2,543,254	100.0	0.0
Registered voters, and turnout						3,387,536	75.1	▼6.1

Popular vote
Unionist	50.1%
Labour	46.7%
Liberal	1.9%
Other	1.3%

Parliamentary seats
Unionist	50.70%
Labour	47.88%
Liberal	1.41%

== See also ==
- 1955 United Kingdom general election in England
- 1955 United Kingdom general election in Wales
- 1955 United Kingdom general election in Northern Ireland
- List of MPs for constituencies in Scotland (1955–1959)
