= Anthony Birch =

Anthony Harold Birch (17 February 1924 – 13 December 2014) was a British scholar and an expert in British politics and comparative politics. He was a leading figure in the development of Britain's distinctive school of political science. Political historians have cited his influential works on representation, the British government, federalism, nationalism, and national integration extensively.

== Early life ==
Birch was born in North London and attended the William Ellis Grammar School in Gospel Oak. After graduating from William Ellis Grammar School, he earned an economics degree at the University College, Nottingham graduating with first class honors in 1945. He was unable to serve in the Second World War due to poor health. After the war, he joined the Board of Trade as an assistant principal and remained there for two years. His passion for scholarship motivated him to enroll in the London School of Economics to pursue a PhD. under Harold Laski. His doctoral work was a comparative study of federalism and public finance in Canada, Australia, and the United States. He obtained his doctorate in 1951. Shortly thereafter, he was awarded a scholarship from the Commonwealth Fund to pursue further studies in the United States as a Harkness Fellow at Harvard University and the University of Chicago. He subsequently revised his dissertation and it was published in 1955 in his first book: Federalism, Finance and Social Legislation in Canada, Australia and the United States (Oxford: Clarendon Press, 1955).

== Academic career ==
Birch took up his first teaching position in 1947 at the University of Manchester, first as a lecturer in the Economics Department, and later in the new Department of Government, established by W.J.M. (Bill) Mackenzie. In 1959, he published his second book, Small Town Politics: A Study of Political Life in Glossop (London: Oxford University Press), a study of local politics in a town located in Derbyshire. The study was influenced by the contemporaneous studies of local power politics in the United States. The book viewed Glossop as a microcosm of wider changes in British politics and society in the 1950s. In a review of this work, the American Robert A. Dahl, a pioneer in studies of community power politics, wrote: "Anyone interested in the political life of modern communities will find this a useful book, and an American will not be disappointed in his search for significant parallels and differences". This work cemented Birch's reputation as a creative and eclectic scholar.

In 1961, Birch worked at the University of Hull in the new Department of Political Studies. While working in the department, he appointed a number of young scholars, many of whom went on to have influential careers as political scientists, including: Robert Benewick, Robert Berki, Howard Elcock, Dennis Kavanagh, Stephen Kirby, Michael Leifer, Jeremy Noakes, Bhikhu Parekh, and (Lord) Trevor Smith. While at Hull, Birch published what has become his most widely cited work, Representative and Responsible Government: An Essay on the Constitution (London: Allen and Unwin, 1964). This text examines the tensions between responsibility and representation in the Constitution in the British historical tradition and in 18th and 19th century political thought. 'The book is about governmental theory but its conceptual framework never gets between the reader and the examples. It could be given painlessly to relative beginners, but raises issues in a way which could spark off the more advanced student'. In a review of this book, Geoffrey Marshall stated: "Professor Birch's book is of a kind which is rare and extremely useful". Bhikhu Parekh commented that it is: "Pioneered a way of looking at democracy, combining both abstract theory and political rhetoric".

In 1967, Birch published his third book, The British System of Government (London: Allen and Unwin, 1967, first edition), which became essential reading for anyone looking for a concise overview of the operation of British political institutions in the late 20th century and was republished in 10 editions.

In 1970, Birch became chair of the Politics Department at Exeter University. During this decade, his focus shifted to questions of nationalism and regional integration, a relevant issue at the time when the question of the devolution of power to Scotland and Wales was at the forefront of political attention. In 1971, Birch published another widely read text, Representation, a brief introduction to the key concept of representation (London: Pall Mall Press and Macmillan, 1971). He published Political Integration and Disintegration in the British Isles (London: Allen and Unwin) in 1977. That year, he moved to Canada, and took up a position as professor in the Department of Political Science at the University of Victoria on Vancouver Island, British Columbia where he worked and taught until his retirement in 1989. It was in Victoria where he wrote his final two works, Nationalism and National Integration (New York: Routledge, 1989) and The Concepts and Theories of Modern Democracy (London: Routledge, 1993) which was republished as a third edition in 2007. By this time, Birch was well into his 80s.

Birch's approach to political science was wide-ranging. He worked across many of the divisions in the field, including those that separate "theory" from empirical work, "domestic" from comparative politics, or "science" from engaged political commentary. His eclectic approach is apparent from the wide range of theoretical and empirical subjects upon which Birch wrote articles and reviews within the major political science journals, including World Politics, the British Journal of Political Science, Government and Opposition, and Political Studies.

== Recognition ==
Birch was president of the Political Studies Association from 1972 to 1975 and vice-president of the International Political Science Association from 1973 to 1976. He was elected a fellow of the Royal Society of Canada in 1988, and was the recipient of the prestigious Sir Isaiah Berlin award for Lifetime Contribution to Political Studies from the Political Studies Association in 2002.

Birch died in Victoria on 13 December 2014, at the age of 90. On the day of his death, several former colleagues paid tribute to his work. Robert Benewick commented that: "Tony Birch's Representative and Responsible Government along with Samuel Beer's Modern British Politics were perhaps the most influential commentaries on British politics published in the 1960s. They challenged the more quantitative and behavioral approaches that were beginning to dominate political science". Lord Trevor Smith praised him as: "one of the most productive and innovative British political scientists in the past sixty years. Although widely read and respected, he never received the recognition that he merited. Invariably his publications were pioneering; he was a true lateral thinker". Wyn Grant described him as: "One of the pioneering figures in the establishment of an academic discipline of politics in Britain".
