= 1955 United Kingdom general election in England =

- 26 May 1955

All 511 English seats in the House of Commons
- Turnout: 76.9% (▼5.8 pp)
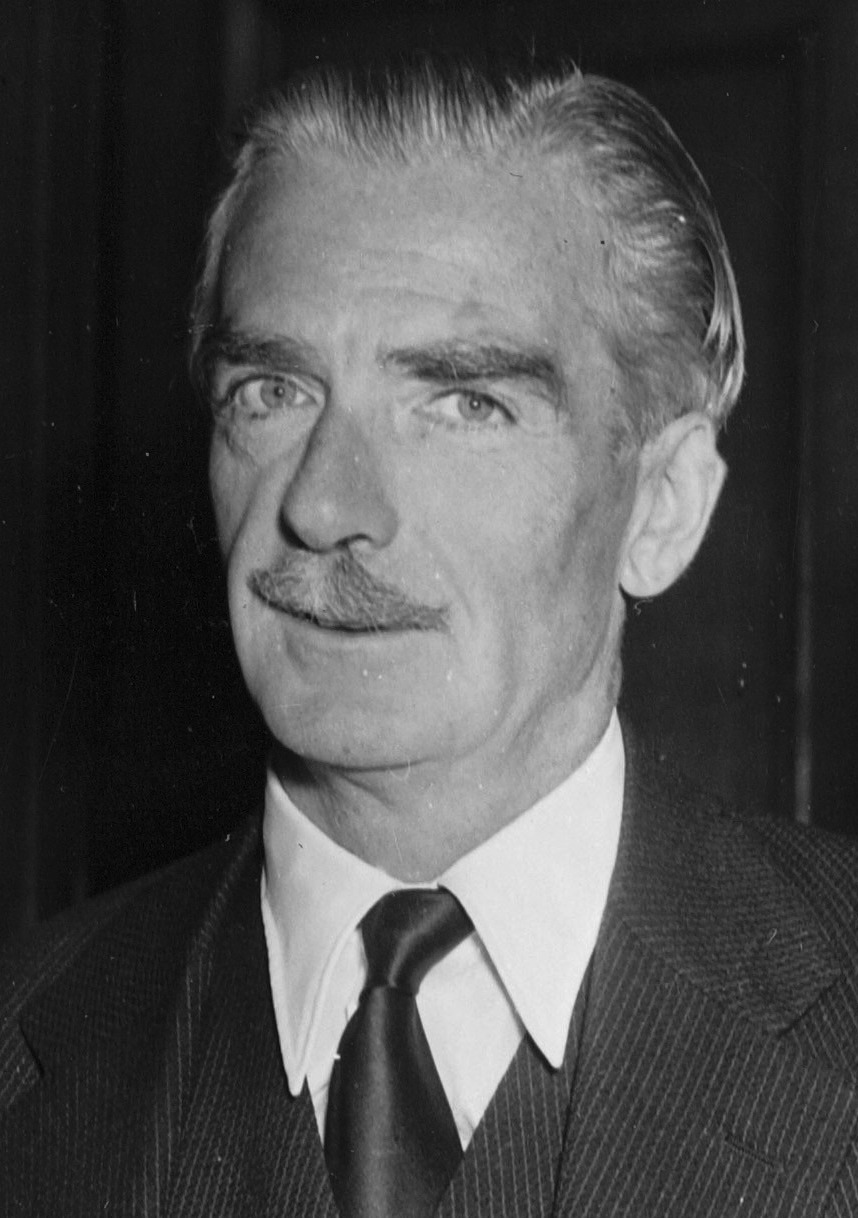

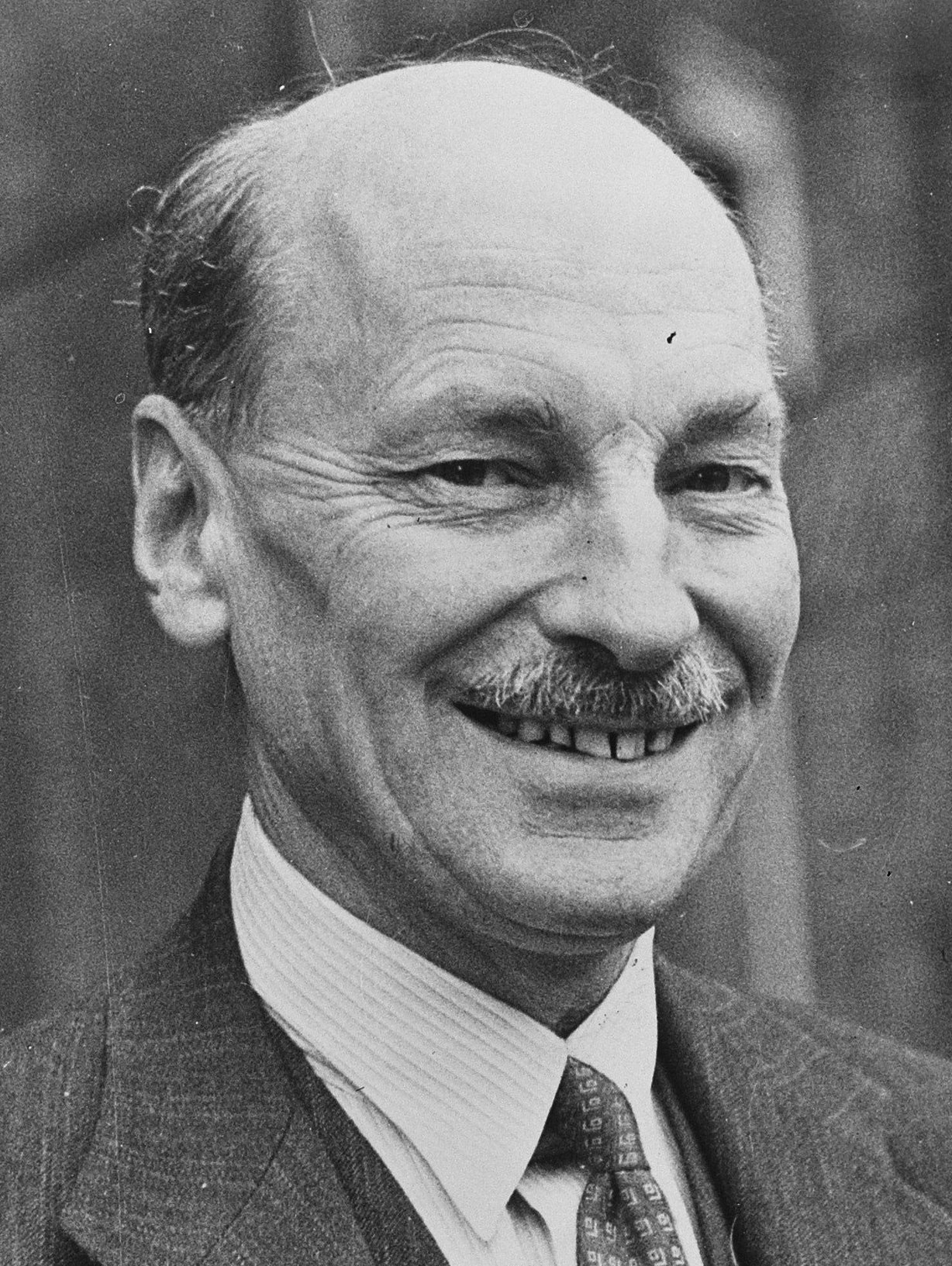

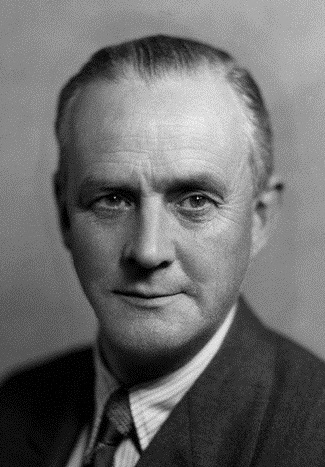
	First party	Second party	Third party
Leader	Anthony Eden	Clement Attlee	Clement Davies
Party	Conservative	Labour	Liberal
Leader since	7 April 1955	25 October 1935	2 August 1945
Leader's seat	Warwick and Leamington	Walthamstow West	Montgomeryshire
Last election	271 seats, 48.8%	233 seats, 48.8%	2 seats, 2.3%
Seats won	293 (Note: Figure includes Speaker of the House of Commons William Morrison in Cirencester and Tewkesbury.)	216	2
Seat change	▲22	▼17	Steady
Popular vote	11,165,436	10,355,892	571,034
Percentage	50.4%	46.8%	2.6%
Swing	▲1.6 pp	▼2.0 pp	▲0.3 pp

On Thursday 26 May 1955, the 1955 United Kingdom general election was held in England, to elect all 630 members of the House of Commons, with 511 constituencies being in England.

It was called immediately after Anthony Eden succeeded Sir Winston Churchill as prime minister in order to strengthen the position of the Conservative Party in the Commons where it enjoyed only a slender majority.

It was the first of 18 general elections held under the reign of Queen Elizabeth II and the first general election whose television coverage is existent. It was the first election under the first periodic review of Westminster constituencies, the first review following the Initial Review of Westminster constituencies. At the same time, it was the fifth and the last election in which the Labour Party was led by Clement Attlee.

== Candidates ==
Below is a table summarising the candidates of the 1955 general election in England.

Affiliation	Candidates
Labour Party	510
Conservative and Unionist Party	480
Liberal Party	95
National Liberal Party	29
Communist Party of Great Britain	11
Independent	4
Independent Labour	2 (Note: The candidates that stood were Douglas C. Cox in Cirencester and Tewkesbury and Lawrence Murphy in Liverpool Exchange.)
Independent Peace	1 (Note: Candidate S.W. Keatley stood in Birmingham Handsworth.)
Independent Labour Party	1 (Note: Candidate H. Birkett stood in Bermondsey.)
Independent Conservative	1 (Note: Candidate William Brownrigg stood in Penrith and The Border.)
Total	1,134

== Analysis ==
=== Conservative Party ===
The Conservative Party recorded a second consecutive victory over the Labour Party, again with few changes in seats. It was the first time since 1935 that the Conservative Party won a greater share of the vote over the Labour Party. The 50.4% vote share recorded by the Conservatives remains the largest share of the vote recorded by any party in a post-war general election. In addition, the 46.8% vote share recorded by the Labour Party in England had been only exceeded by the party in the 1966 general election.

Labour lost several seats to the Conservatives in England. These seats were Carlisle, Ealing North, Gloucestershire South, Gravesend, Halifax, Hornchurch, Leeds North East, Liverpool Kirkdale, Maldon, Nottingham Central, Nottingham South, Preston South, Southampton Test, Walthamstow East, Wandsworth Central, Watford, The Wrekin.

Maurice Macmillan, the son of future Prime Minister Harold Macmillan, entered Parliament in Halifax. Keith Joseph who would go on to several cabinet positions under four Conservative Prime Ministers entered Parliament in Leeds North East. Brian Harrison entered Parliament in Maldon, and would hold the seat until the February 1974 general election. Michael Hughes-Young entered Parliament in Wandsworth Central, and would hold the seat until 1964. William Yates entered Parliament in The Wrenkin, and would hold the seat until 1966, following which he would become a Member of Parliament in Australia. It also retained Sunderland South, which the party had won the 1953 Sunderland South by-election. The retention was a gain from the Labour Party in comparison to the previous election.

It also gained the newly created seats of Chigwell, Eastleigh, Essex South East, Hertfordshire East, Nantwich, Rye, Surbiton, Walsall South.

However, lost the abolished seat of Blackburn West, wherein Ralph Assheton retired from the House of Commons. Assheton subsequently entered the House of Lords and served as Lord Lieutenant of Lancashire. The Conservatives also lost the abolished seats of Leeds North, wherein Minister Osbert Peake retired from Parliament. It also lost the abolished Reading North, Frederic Bennett retiring. However, would go on to return to Parliament in the seat of Torquay at the 1955 Torquay by-election.

With 26 gains and six losses, the Conservative Party won an overall 20 seats in England.

=== National Liberal Party ===
The National Liberal Party, which was in a constituency alliance with the Conservative Party won two further seats at this election. It retained its seats of Bedfordshire South, Bradford North, Harwich, Holland with Boston, Huntingdonshire, Luton, Newcastle upon Tyne North, Norfolk Central, St Ives, Torrington, Sheffield Hallam and Sheffield Heeley.

It also gained two seats from the Labour Party. It won Bradford West which replaced the Labour-held seat of Bradford Central. It also gained Plymouth Devonport, which it had lost in 1945. As such, the National Liberal Party increased its seat count in England from 12 seats to 14 in total. This was in spite of the party fielding fewer candidates than in the previous election, and suffering a small drop in vote share across England. Combined with the Conservative Party results in England, there were 28 gains but six losses in terms of seats across the constituency alliance between the parties.

=== Labour Party ===
The Labour Party along with its 20 losses to the Conservatives and National Liberals, also lost the abolished seats of Birmingham Erdington, Fulham West, Leeds Central, Manchester Clayton and Sheffield Neepsend. However Labour gained Bristol North West, South West Norfolk and Romford from the Conservatives. It also gained the newly created seats of Birmingham All Saints, Erith and Crayford, Feltham, Leeds East, Meriden. Denis Howell entered Parliament in Brimingham All Saints. Denis Healey won Leeds East, after moving from Leeds South East which he had won at the 1952 Leeds South East by-election. With 25 losses and eight gains in terms of seats, the party lost an overall 17 seats.

=== Liberal Party ===
The Liberal Party retained its two seats in England. Arthur Holt retained the seat of Bolton West, with Donald Wade retaining Huddersfield West. The Liberals received a slight increase in vote share in England, fielding a few more candidates than in the previous election.

== Results ==
Party	Seats					Aggregate votes		
Party	Total	Gains	Losses	Net	Of all (%)	Total	Of all (%)	Change (%)
Conservative (Total)	293	28	6	▲22	57.3	11,165,436	50.4	▲1.6
Conservative	279	26	6	▲20	54.6	10,586,790	47.8	▲2.2
National Liberal	14	2	0	▲2	2.7	578,646	2.6	▼0.6
Labour	216	8	25	▼17	42.4	10,355,892	46.8	▼2.0
Liberal	2	0	0	Steady	0.4	571,034	2.6	▲0.3
Communist	0	0	0	Steady	—	15,405	0.1	▲0.1
Independent Labour	0	Did not stand in 1951			—	15,322	0.1	—N/a
Independent	0	0	0	Steady	—	9,810	0.0	▼0.1
Independent Peace	0	New			—	2,148	0.0	New
Ind. Labour Party	0	0	0	Steady	—	715	0.0	Steady
Ind. Conservative	0	0	0	Steady	—	368	0.0	Steady
Total	511			▲5	100.0	22,136,130	100.0	0.0
Registered voters, and turnout						28,790,285	76.9	▼5.8

Popular vote
Conservative	50.4%
Labour	46.8%
Liberal	2.6%
Other	0.2%

Parliament seats
Conservative	57.3%
Labour	42.4%
Liberal	0.4%

== By region ==
Note: the following tables indicate the results according to the regions of England which were established in 1994, based on the county boundaries established in the 1974 local government reforms. These regions were not used at the time for the purposes of this election.

The number of seats for each region that were changed under the first periodic review of Westminster constituencies are indicated respectively.

=== East Midlands ===
Party	Seats					Aggregate votes		
Party	Total	Gains	Losses	Net	Of all (%)	Total	Of all (%)	Change (%)
Labour	23	0	2	▼2	60.5	—N/a	51.8	▼1.9
Conservative	15	2	0	▲2	39.5	—N/a	46.8	▲2.6
Liberal	0	0	0	Steady	0.0	—N/a	1.4	▼0.7
Others	0	0	0	Steady	0.0	—N/a	0.1	▲0.1
Total	38			Steady		—N/a		

=== East of England ===
Party	Seats					Aggregate votes		
Party	Total	Gains	Losses	Net	Of all (%)	Total	Of all (%)	Change (%)
Conservative	35	5	1	▲4	85.3	—N/a	52.8	▼1.6
Labour	7	1	2	▼1	17.1	—N/a	45.0	▼4.8
Liberal	0	0	0	Steady	0.0	—N/a	2.2	▲6.2
Others	0	0	0	Steady	0.0	—N/a	0.0	Steady
Total	41			▲3		—N/a		

=== Greater London ===
Party	Seats					Aggregate votes		
Party	Total	Gains	Losses	Net	Of all (%)	Total	Of all (%)	Change (%)
Conservative	54	5	1	▲4	52.9	—N/a	49.3	▲1.7
Labour	48	1	3	▼2	47.1	—N/a	47.8	▼2.1
Liberal	0	0	0	Steady	0.0	—N/a	2.6	▲0.7
Others	0	0	0	Steady	0.0	—N/a	0.3	▼0.2
Total	102			▲2		—N/a		

=== North East England ===
Party	Seats					Aggregate votes		
Party	Total	Gains	Losses	Net	Of all (%)	Total	Of all (%)	Change (%)
Labour	24	0	1	▼1	77.4	—N/a	57.7	▼1.6
Conservative	7	1	0	▲1	22.6	—N/a	41.9	▲2.4
Liberal	0	0	0	Steady	0.0	—N/a	0.4	▼0.3
Others	0	0	0	Steady	0.0	—N/a	0.0	▼0.5
Total	31			Steady		—N/a		

=== North West England ===
Party	Seats					Aggregate votes		
Party	Total	Gains	Losses	Net	Of all (%)	Total	Of all (%)	Change (%)
Conservative	46	3	0	▲3	52.0	—N/a	50.3	▲1.4
Labour	36	0	4	▼4	43.4	—N/a	45.8	▼1.4
Liberal	1	0	0	Steady	1.2	—N/a	2.1	▼0.1
Others	0	0	0	Steady	0.0	—N/a	0.1	▲0.1
Total	83			▼1		—N/a		

=== South East England ===
Party	Seats					Aggregate votes		
Party	Total	Gains	Losses	Net	Of all (%)	Total	Of all (%)	Change (%)
Conservative	55	3	0	▲3	90.2	—N/a	60.0	▼1.2
Labour	6	0	2	▼2	9.8	—N/a	37.8	▼4.2
Liberal	0	0	0	Steady	0.0	—N/a	2.0	▲5.6
Others	0	0	0	Steady	0.0	—N/a	0.2	▲0.2
Total	61			▲1		—N/a		

=== South West England ===
Party	Seats					Aggregate votes		
Party	Total	Gains	Losses	Net	Of all (%)	Total	Of all (%)	Change (%)
Conservative	36 (Note: Figure includes the Speaker of the House of Commons.)	2	1	▲1	80.0	—N/a	53.1	▲0.6
Labour	9	1	2	▼1	20.0	—N/a	38.1	▼3.4
Liberal	0	0	0	Steady	0.0	—N/a	8.2	▲2.2
Others	0	0	0	Steady	0.0	—N/a	0.6	▲0.6
Total	45			Steady		—N/a		

=== West Midlands ===
Party	Seats					Aggregate votes		
Party	Total	Gains	Losses	Net	Of all (%)	Total	Of all (%)	Change (%)
Labour	32	0	0	Steady	59.3	—N/a	49.4	▼3.1
Conservative	22	2	0	▲2	40.7	—N/a	49.2	▲2.4
Liberal	0	0	0	Steady	0.0	—N/a	1.2	▲0.5
Others	0	0	0	Steady	0.0	—N/a	0.2	▲0.2
Total	54			▲2		—N/a		

=== Yorkshire and the Humber ===
Party	Seats					Aggregate votes		
Party	Total	Gains	Losses	Net	Of all (%)	Total	Of all (%)	Change (%)
Labour	32	0	4	▼4	57.1	—N/a	52.3	▼1.4
Conservative	23	2	0	▲2	41.1	—N/a	44.3	▲1.7
Liberal	1	0	0	Steady	1.8	—N/a	3.3	▼0.3
Others	0	0	0	Steady	0.0	—N/a	0.1	▲0.1
Total	56			▼2		—N/a		

== See also ==
- 1955 United Kingdom general election in Northern Ireland
- 1955 United Kingdom general election in Scotland
- 1955 United Kingdom general election in Wales
