= Thomas Griffiths (politician) =

British politician

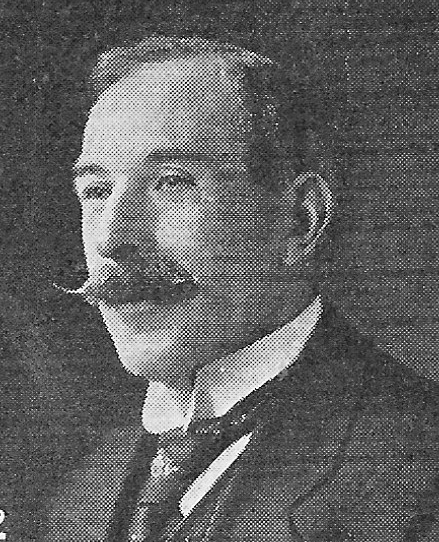

Member of Parliament for Pontypool
- In office 14 December 1918 – 14 November 1935
- Succeeded by: Arthur Jenkins

Personal details
- Born: 1867 Neath, Wales
- Died: 4 February 1955 (aged 87–88) Oxford, England
- Party: Labour
- Spouse: Mary Elizabeth Morgan
- Children: 2
- Profession: Trade Union Official

Thomas Griffiths (1867–1955) was a Welsh trade union official and Labour Party politician, he was a member of parliament for Pontypool from 1918 to 1935.

== Early life ==
Griffiths was born in 1867 in Neath, Wales and was educated at the Melyn Voluntary School. In 1899 at the age of 32 Griffiths became a student at the newly opened Ruskin College in Oxford, England. In his home town he worked in the local steel industry and also served on Neath Town Council.

== Politics ==
He was appointed a Divisional Officer of Iron and Steel Trades Confederation and in the 1918 General Election he became the member of parliament for Pontypool. Between 1919 and 1925 he was a Labour Party Whip and in 1924 he briefly became the Treasurer of the King's Household.

== Private life ==
He married Mary Elizabeth Morgan in 1891 and they had a son and a daughter, he died aged 87 in Oxford, England on 4 February 1955.

Parliament of the United Kingdom
New constituency	Member of Parliament for Pontypool; 1918–1935	Succeeded by Arthur Jenkins
Political offices
Preceded by George Gibbs	Treasurer of the Household; 1924	Succeeded by George Gibbs
