= William Ellis School =

Location
- Highgate Road; Gospel Oak, London, NW5 1RN; England
- 51°33′32″N 0°09′02″W

Information
- Type: Voluntary aided school
- Established: 1862
- Founder: William Ellis
- Local authority: London Borough of Camden
- Department for Education URN: 100056 Tables
- Ofsted: Reports
- Headteacher: Izzy Jones
- Staff: 95 teaching, 30 support
- Gender: Boys
- Age: 11 to 18
- Enrolment: 853
- Colours: Blue & Gold (Year 7-9) & Black (Year 10-11)
- Alumni Society: The Old Elysians Club
- Website: https://www.williamellis.camden.sch.uk/

William Ellis School is a voluntary aided secondary school and sixth form for boys located in Gospel Oak, London, England.

== Admissions ==
The School is located near Hampstead Heath in north London.

It is situated just east of Parliament Hill and north of Gospel Oak railway station. It is next to Parliament Hill School, a girls' school.

Up to 10% of places are offered to boys with an aptitude for music as determined by a music aptitude test.

== History ==
=== Origins ===
The school's founder, William Ellis (not to be confused with the inventor of rugby football, William Webb Ellis) was a public-spirited businessman. In the mid-19th century, Ellis founded a number of schools (named Birkbeck Schools after George Birkbeck, adult education pioneer and founder of Birkbeck University, London) and inspired many teachers to promote his educational ideas.

Ellis wanted children to be taught "useful" subjects such as science (including "Social Science"), and to develop the faculty of reason; this was in contrast to the learning by rote of religious tracts, ancient languages and history, characteristic of many schools at the time. Whilst William Ellis School is the only one of these schools that retains William Ellis' name, the last surviving Birkbeck School still operating as a school in its original Grade II listed building (1862) is Colvestone Primary School (previously the 'Kingsland Birkbeck School') in Dalston, East London.

=== Foundation and development (1862-1937) ===
The school was established in 1862 at Gospel Oak, and was originally known as the Gospel Oak Schools. It catered for both girls and boys of a wide age range. In 1889, the Gospel Oak Schools were reconstituted as a boys' secondary school, under the headmastership of E.B. Cumberland.

=== Move to current site and grammar school years (1937–1978) ===
At this time, the school displayed characteristics of traditional public schools, such as a house system; a prefect system (with prefects wearing gowns when on duty); a school song; and playing rugby football rather than football as the school sport. School uniform was strictly observed, with blazer colours and ties indicating Junior School, Middle School, Sixth Form and prefects; and blazers and ties could only be removed in the summer if the weather was pronounced “Officially Hot”.

It combined these traditional features with liberal educational developments such as School Committees, in which pupils discussed and helped determine aspects of school policy. Classes in each Form were labelled G, L and M (rather than A, B and C) to avoid any suggestion of rank or streaming.

The school ran its lessons on an unusual six-day timetable, so that if a Monday were Day One, the following Monday would be Day Six of the timetable, and Day One’s academic timetable would fall on the Tuesday. This provided a rotation of lessons, so that unpopular items did not always fall upon the same weekday; it also allocated a Day for the sports activities of each Form, from First to Sixth, which again did not always fall upon the same weekday. It was a matter of pride that pupils could master the Six Day timetable, and remember over weekends and vacations the Day upon which the School would recommence. The school also had a Combined Cadet Force with army and RAF sections. The CCF Hut on the periphery of the school playground nearest Parliament Hill Fields houses a stores for uniforms etc., an armoury with chained very elderly Lee Enfield .303 rifles, and one .22 target rifle.

Around 1955 two young teachers who had qualified during or as a result of a three-year short service contract in the Education Corps resigned to return to Army service in the Greenjackets, causing something of a concern.

Although the adjacent Parliament Hill Fields and Kenwood were used for cross country running, rugby and cricket activities were held at the School's extensive playing fields in Edgware, some seven miles away. Pupils at least between 1951 and 1955 walked to Belsize Park Underground and thence to Edgware by train holding cardboard tickets, later would be ferried to and from the fields by coach on their appointed games afternoon.

=== The shift to comprehensive status (1978 onwards) ===
Much ingenuity had gone into extending and converting the building to provide the additional classrooms and specialist accommodation required by the post-war grammar school's large sixth form. However, the school's relatively small size meant that it was not capable of becoming either an independent, or a full comprehensive school, at the point when the state withdrew funding from direct grant grammar schools. An option of the school going independent was discussed. In March 1977, a group of parents tried to get a High Court injunction to stop the governors changing its grammar school status, organised by Dudley Stanley Fox.

With the provision of better facilities for the national curriculum and for information technology the School became fully comprehensive in the years after 1978. The Queen visited the school on 7 November 1979. Journalist and educational campaigner Fiona Millar, previously a school governor, sent both her sons to the school. Michael Palin and Patricia Hewitt have also sent their sons to the school.

=== Recent history (1990-present) ===
From 1990 the School gained greater autonomy under the Local Management of Schools scheme, and spent a devolved budget of over £13 million per year for its 1000 pupils. In 1997 the school earned Language College status under the Specialist School Scheme.

In line with this specialist status, the school requires students to study at least two languages in Key Stage 3, with a requirement for at least one to be taken at GCSE level. Languages on offer include French, German, Spanish, Mandarin Chinese, Russian and Bengali. In addition, the school employs a number of native-speaking language specialists, who work with students throughout the school, but particularly in coaching GCSE and A-Level candidates in advance of oral language exams. The schools Language College was removed in 2011, and cutbacks in the languages department have been made, in terms of staff members and language teaching time.

In January 2008, it was revealed that the school was in financial difficulty, following a dispute between the school and the local authority concerning a new central heating system. Consequently, the incumbent headmaster R.J. Tanton stepped down from his position. J.M. Rose (who had begun his career at the school in the 1970s, and was now Director of the Sixth Form consortium) was appointed Acting Headmaster.

The previous Headmaster, Sam White, formerly Deputy Headmaster of the London Oratory School, took up his position in September 2011, and left at the end of the 2019-20 school year. The current Headteacher is Izzy Jones.

== Headteachers since 1862 ==
- Edward Teather 1862-1889
- Edward Boyce Cumberland 1889-1919 (First Headmaster of the reconstituted school)
  - F. G. Firth (Acting 1917-1918)
- Major William Hathaway Davis, DSO, MC, MA
- Edgar Paul Jewitt (Acting 1928-1929)
- Dr. Thomas Crockett MA, D.Litt(Edin) 1929-1942
  - Albert Edward Ball (Headmaster of North London Emergency Secondary School for Boys 1940-1945)
- Edmund Richard Martin (Acting 1942-1944)
- Francis William Lockwood MA(Cantab.) 1944-1953
- Albert Edward Ball (Acting 1953-1954)
- Sydney Leonard Baxter MA(Cantab.) 1954-1975
- R. L. Perry MA 1975-1983
- Roy Blatchford MA (Acting) 1983
- R. K. James MA 1984-1988
- Michael W. Wheale MA 1988-2002
- Richard J. Tanton BA 2002-2008
- James Malcolm Rose BA (Acting) 2008
- Robert J. Cathcart LRAM 2008-2010
- Jill Hislop (interim) 2010–2011
- Sam White 2011–2020
- Izzy Jones 2020–present (Oxon.)

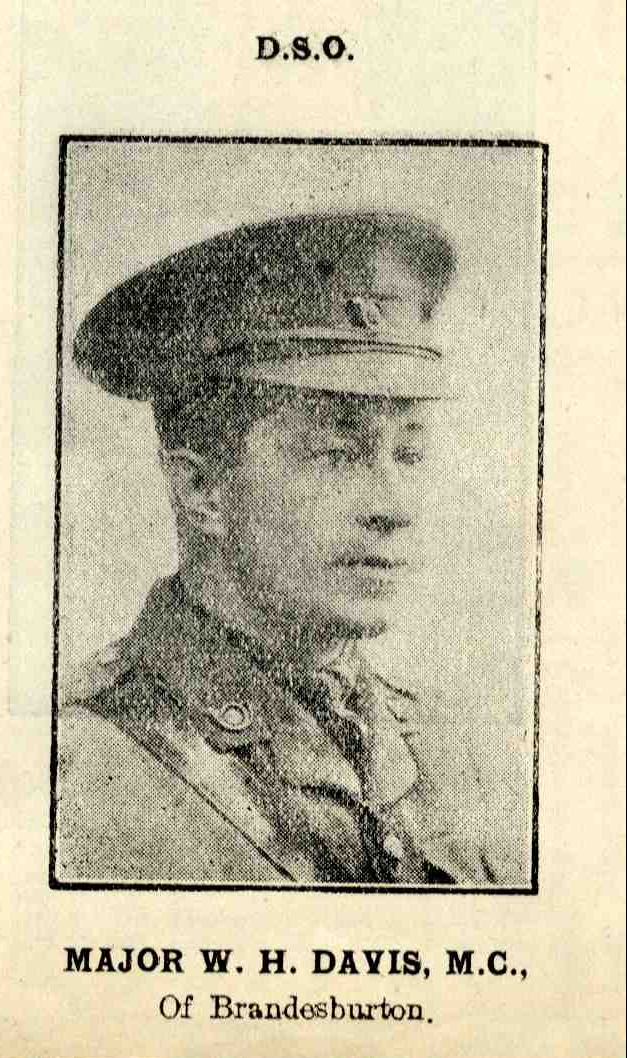
Headmaster Davis

== Involvement in the LaSWAP Sixth Form Consortium ==
William Ellis School has a joint Sixth Form with the adjacent Parliament Hill Girls School, and all classes are coeducational. Together with La Sainte Union Catholic Secondary School and Acland Burghley School they make up the "LaSWAP" consortium for 16–19 education, educating around 1000 students altogether.

== Academic performance ==
In 2018, 86 per cent of pupils entered for a language GCSE: placing William Ellis School is in the top 10 per cent of all state—funded mainstream secondary schools in the country for modern language entries.

In the summer of 2019, 84% of William Ellis students entered the English Baccalaureate compared to the national average of 29.70%.

== Notable former pupils ==
=== 1978-present (comprehensive school period) ===
- Kingsley Ben-Adir, actor
- Geraint Bowen, organist and director of music since 2001 at Hereford Cathedral
- Richard Causton, composer
- Nigel Godrich, Grammy Award-winning recording engineer and record producer
- Tim Guest, author
- Alexei de Keyser, scriptwriter
- Nicholas Russell, 6th Earl Russell
- Sean Yazbeck, The Apprentice (US Season 5), winner
- Toby Young, author

=== 1862-1978 (early years and grammar school period) ===
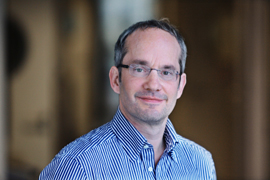
Geneticist Anthony Hyman FRS

- Tobias Abse, lecturer in European History, Goldsmiths, University of London
- David Aaronovitch, Times journalist, and President from 1980-82 of the National Union of Students
- Daniel Battsek, film producer, former President of Miramax Films
- Mark Bedford, bass player of Madness, Robert Wyatt and Morrissey
- Anthony Birch, political scientist
- Meurig Bowen, Artistic Director of the Cheltenham Music Festival
- Tom Bower, journalist, biographer and former BBC documentary producer
- Tom Brook, BBC World News reporter
- Barry Bucknell, popularised DIY on TV
- Ray Butt, television producer of Citizen Smith, Only Fools and Horses and Just Good Friends
- Norman Collins, Controller of BBC TV from 1947–50, and whilst at BBC Radio created Woman's Hour in 1946
- Ken Colyer, jazz trumpeter
- Gerry Conway (musician)
- Hugh Cornwell, singer-songwriter of The Stranglers
- Dickie Davies, ITV sports presenter from 1964–89
- Len Deighton, author and film maker
- Sir John Dellow CBE, Deputy Commissioner of the Metropolitan Police from 1987–91
- David Deutsch, physicist at the Clarendon Laboratory, who wrote The Fabric of Reality
- Paul Ernest, professor at Exeter University, who wrote Social Constructivism as a Philosophy of Mathematics
- Orlando Figes, historian
- Marco Goldschmied, architect, co-founder and managing director of Richard Rogers Partnership, President from 1999-2001 of RIBA,
- Leonard Goodwin CMG, Director from 1964-80 of the Nuffield Laboratories at the Institute of Zoology, and who claimed to have introduced the idea of keeping hamsters as pets
- Maurice Gran, TV comedy writer for programmes such as Goodnight Sweetheart
- Michael Green (physicist), Lucasian Chair of Mathematics Cambridge University
- Sir Roy Halliday DSC, Vice Admiral and Director-General Intelligence, Defence Intelligence Staff
- Michael Horovitz, British poet who was a leading part of the Beat Poetry scene in the UK
- Anthony A. Hyman, FRS - molecular cell biologist and Director of the Max Planck Institute for Molecular Cell Biology and Genetics: Dresden, Germany
- Michael Irwin (author), Professor of English at the University of Kent
- Prof Donald Jeffries, virologist, knowledgeable on HIV
- Bernard Jenkin, Conservative MP from 1997-2010 for North Essex and from 1992-97 for Colchester North
- Clive Langer, music producer for Morrissey and Madness
- Roland Levinsky, Vice-Chancellor from 2002-07 of the University of Plymouth and Hugh Greenwood Professor of Immunology at the UCL Institute of Child Health from 1985–99
- Mark Mazower, historian
- Michael J McEvoy, musician, film score composer, Soul II Soul member
- Jonathan Miller (businessman), Chief Executive from 2002-06 of AOL (only for one year)
- Eric Neville, Professor of Mathematics from 1919-54 at the University of Reading and known for Neville's algorithm
- Fred Newman (publisher), founder of Publishing News and the British Book Awards
- Andrew Sachs, actor, known for Fawlty Towers
- Tim Selwood, opening batsman who made 18 appearances for Middlesex CCC
- Bill Sheils, Professor of History at the University of York
- Phil Soussan - musician, songwriter, Bass player of Ozzy Osbourne, Billy Idol and others and previous Vice President of the Grammys
- Joe Swift, TV gardener, son of actor Clive Swift (Keeping Up Appearances) and author Dame Margaret Drabble
- Julien Temple, film maker who made the 1980 The Great Rock 'n' Roll Swindle
- Richard Thompson, singer-songwriter and guitarist with Fairport Convention
- Fred Titmus, England cricketer (53 tests) from 1955–1975, Wisden Cricketer of the Year in 1963
- Neil Turok, Professor of Mathematical Physics from 1996-2008 at the University of Cambridge, and Director since 2008 of the Perimeter Institute for Theoretical Physics
- John Hartley Williams, poet
- Prof Bernard Wood FRS, geophysicist, Professor of Earth Sciences from 1989-2005 at the University of Bristol, Professor of Mineralogy at Oxford
