= Pontypool (UK Parliament constituency) =

UK Parliament constituency (1918–1983)

- Former county constituency for the House of Commons

1918–1983
- Seats: one
- Created from: North Monmouthshire and South Monmouthshire
- Replaced by: Torfaen

Pontypool was a county constituency in the town of Pontypool in Monmouthshire. It returned one Member of Parliament (MP) to the House of Commons of the Parliament of the United Kingdom, elected by the first past the post voting system.

The constituency was created for the 1918 general election, and was replaced with Torfaen for the 1983 general election. This was to correspond with the name and area of the Torfaen local authority created in 1974. The Torfaen constituency contained the whole of the old Pontypool seat, adding just 247 electors from Monmouth.

== Boundaries ==
1918–1950: The Urban Districts of Abersychan, Blaenavon, Llanfrechfa Upper, Llantarnam, Panteg, and Pontypool.

1950–1983: The Urban Districts of Blaenavon, Cwmbran, and Pontypool.

== Members of Parliament ==
Election	Member	Party
1918	Thomas Griffiths	Labour
1935	Arthur Jenkins	Labour
1946 by-election	Granville West	Labour
1958 by-election	Leo Abse	Labour
1983	constituency abolished	

== Election results ==
=== Elections in the 1910s ===
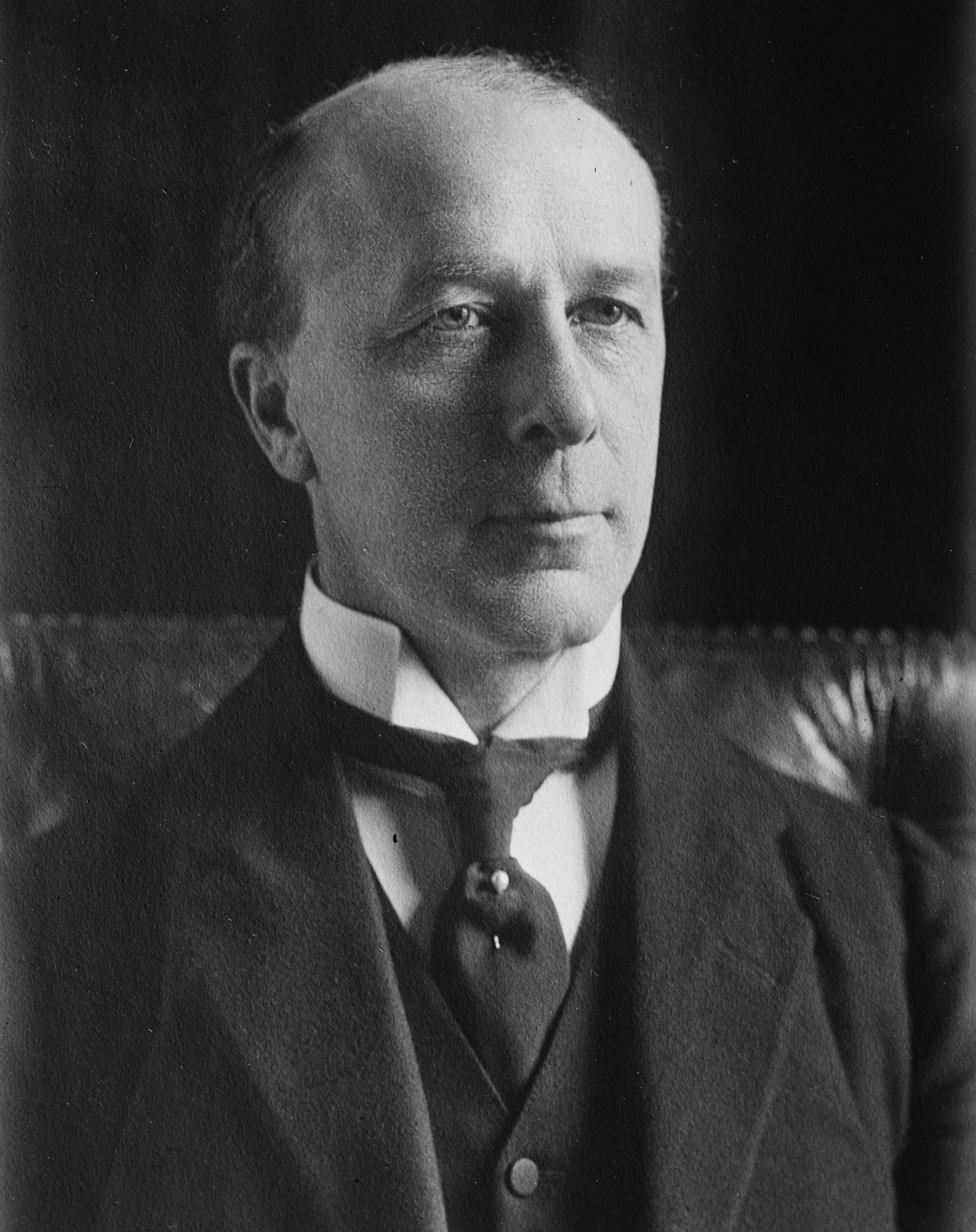
McKenna

General election 1918: Pontypool
Party		Candidate	Votes	%	±%
	Labour	Thomas Griffiths	8,438	39.0	
C	Unionist	Leonard Wilkinson Llewelyn	7,021	32.5	
	Liberal	Reginald McKenna	6,160	28.5	
Majority			1,417	6.5	
Turnout			21,619	72.1	
	Labour win (new seat)				
C indicates candidate endorsed by the coalition government.

=== Elections in the 1920s ===
General election 1922: Pontypool
Party	Candidate	Votes	%	±%
Labour	Thomas Griffiths	11,198	40.6	+1.6
Unionist	Thomas George Jones	8,654	31.4	−1.1
Liberal	Robert Connell	7,733	28.0	−0.5
Majority		2,544	9.2	+2.7
Turnout		27,585	85.0	+12.9
Labour hold		Swing	+1.3	

General election 1923: Pontypool
Party	Candidate	Votes	%	±%
Labour	Thomas Griffiths	13,770	50.6	+10.0
Liberal	S.J. Robins	13,444	49.4	+21.4
Majority		326	1.2	−8.0
Turnout		27,214	81.6	−3.4
Labour hold		Swing	-5.7	

General election 1924: Pontypool
Party	Candidate	Votes	%	±%
Labour	Thomas Griffiths	15,378	52.6	+2.0
Unionist	Lionel Beaumont-Thomas	13,831	47.4	New
Majority		1,547	5.2	+4.0
Turnout		29,209	84.5	+2.9
Labour hold		Swing		

General election 1929: Pontypool
Party	Candidate	Votes	%	±%
Labour	Thomas Griffiths	17,805	51.5	−1.1
Liberal	Geoffrey Crawshay	12,581	36.4	New
Unionist	Gwilym Rowlands	4,188	12.1	−35.4
Majority		5,224	15.1	+9.9
Turnout		34,574	84.6	+0.1
Labour hold		Swing		

=== Elections in the 1930s ===
General election 1931: Pontypool
Party	Candidate	Votes	%	±%
Labour	Thomas Griffiths	18,981	56.34	+4.8
National Liberal	Thomas Keens	14,709	43.66	+7.3
Majority		4,272	12.68	−2.4
Turnout		33,690	81.99	−2.6
Registered electors		41,090		
Labour hold		Swing	-1.25	

General election 1935: Pontypool
Party	Candidate	Votes	%	±%
Labour	Arthur Jenkins	22,346	67.92	+11.58
Conservative	Leonard Caplan	10,555	32.08	−11.58
Majority		11,791	35.84	+23.16
Turnout		32,901	78.55	−3.44
Labour hold		Swing	+11.58	

=== Elections in the 1940s ===
General election 1945: Pontypool
Party	Candidate	Votes	%	±%
Labour	Arthur Jenkins	27,455	77.28	+9.36
Conservative	John Gabriel Weeple	8,072	22.72	−9.36
Majority		19,383	54.56	+18.72
Turnout		35,527	77.17	−1.38
Labour hold		Swing	+9.36	

1946 Pontypool by-election
Party	Candidate	Votes	%	±%
Labour	Granville West	23,359	74.09	−3.19
Conservative	P. Welch	8,170	25.91	+3.19
Majority		15,189	48.17	−6.39
Turnout		31,529		
Labour hold		Swing		

=== Elections in the 1950s ===
General election 1950: Pontypool
Party	Candidate	Votes	%	±%
Labour	Granville West	28,267	72.25	−5.03
Conservative	Arthur Russell	6,616	16.91	−5.81
Liberal	Ernest Aneurin Robert Mathias	4,240	10.84	New
Majority		21,651	55.34	+0.78
Turnout		39,123	84.78	+7.61
Labour hold		Swing	+0.39	

General election 1951: Pontypool
Party	Candidate	Votes	%	±%
Labour	Granville West	29,553	75.74	+3.49
Conservative	Aylwin O Hewitt	9,464	24.26	+7.35
Majority		20,089	51.49	−3.85
Turnout		39,017	84.29	−0.49
Labour hold		Swing	-1.93	

General election 1955: Pontypool
Party	Candidate	Votes	%	±%
Labour	Granville West	26,372	72.91	−2.83
Conservative	Aylwin O Hewitt	9,800	27.09	+2.83
Majority		16,572	45.81	−5.68
Turnout		36,172	77.09	−7.20
Labour hold		Swing	-2.83	

1958 Pontypool by-election
Party	Candidate	Votes	%	±%
Labour	Leo Abse	20,000	68.49	−4.42
Conservative	Paul S Thomas	6,273	21.48	−5.61
Plaid Cymru	Benjamin CL Morgan	2,927	10.02	New
Majority		13,727	47.01	+1.2
Turnout		29,200	61.7	−15.4
Labour hold		Swing		

General election 1959: Pontypool
Party	Candidate	Votes	%	±%
Labour	Leo Abse	26,755	70.08	−2.83
Conservative	Paul S Thomas	8,903	23.32	−3.77
Plaid Cymru	Benjamin CL Morgan	2,519	6.60	N/A
Majority		17,852	46.76	+0.95
Turnout		38,177	80.45	+3.36
Labour hold		Swing	+0.47	

=== Elections in the 1960s ===
General election 1964: Pontypool
Party	Candidate	Votes	%	±%
Labour	Leo Abse	27,852	74.57	+4.49
Conservative	Paul D Mendel	8,169	21.87	−1.45
Communist	W Edward Jones	1,329	3.56	New
Majority		19,683	52.70	+5.94
Turnout		37,350	77.77	−2.68
Registered electors		48,024		
Labour hold		Swing	+2.97	

General election 1966: Pontypool
Party	Candidate	Votes	%	±%
Labour	Leo Abse	27,909	77.05	+2.48
Conservative	Peter T James	7,418	20.48	−1.39
Communist	W Edward Jones	897	2.48	−1.08
Majority		20,491	56.57	+3.87
Turnout		36,224	75.40	−2.37
Registered electors		48,040		
Labour hold		Swing	+1.94	

=== Elections in the 1970s ===
General election 1970: Pontypool
Party	Candidate	Votes	%	±%
Labour	Leo Abse	27,402	70.70	
Conservative	W Mather Bell	8,869	22.88	
Plaid Cymru	Harri Webb	2,053	5.30	New
Communist	Brian Watkinson	435	1.12	
Majority		18,533	47.82	
Turnout		38,759	71.94	
Labour hold		Swing		

General election February 1974: Pontypool
Party	Candidate	Votes	%	±%
Labour	Leo Abse	25,133	59.68	−11.02
Liberal	Ernest Aneurin Robert Mathias	7,668	18.21	New
Conservative	Wellesley Theodore Octavius Wallace	7,497	17.80	−5.08
Plaid Cymru	Roger David Tanner	1,318	3.13	−2.17
Communist	Graham Robert Williams	498	1.18	−0.06
Majority		17,465	41.47	−6.35
Turnout		42,114	77.01	+5.07
Labour hold		Swing		

General election October 1974: Pontypool
Party	Candidate	Votes	%	±%
Labour	Leo Abse	25,381	63.40	+3.72
Conservative	Robert John Moreland	6,686	16.70	−1.10
Liberal	Ernest Aneurin Robert Mathias	5,744	14.35	−3.86
Plaid Cymru	Roger David Tanner	2,223	5.55	+2.42
Majority		18,695	46.70	+5.23
Turnout		40,034	72.66	−3.35
Labour hold		Swing	+2.41	

General election 1979: Pontypool
Party	Candidate	Votes	%	±%
Labour	Leo Abse	27,751	61.93	−1.47
Conservative	Tom Sackville	10,383	23.17	+6.47
Liberal	Ernest Aneurin Robert Mathias	5,508	12.29	−2.06
Plaid Cymru	William James Hyde	1,169	2.61	−2.94
Majority		17,368	38.76	−7.94
Turnout		44,811	78.36	+5.70
Labour hold		Swing	-3.97	
