= Donald Jeffries =

British virologist and academic

Professor Donald Jeffries (29 August 1941 – 7 December 2011) was a British virologist and academic. He was a leading expert on the Human Immunodeficiency Virus (HIV) that causes AIDS.

== Education ==
Jeffries was educated at the William Ellis Grammar School in Highgate, North London, and then did medical training at the Royal Free Hospital School, from where he qualified in 1966.

== Career ==
Jeffries began his career at St Mary's Hospital Medical School in Paddington as senior registrar in microbiology. He remained at St Mary’s until 1990, by when he had become a reader in virology and the director of clinical studies. Whilst at St Mary’s Jeffries led a team which developed the antiretroviral drug Saquinavir, the first protease inhibitor used for HIV treatment, in collaboration with the pharmaceutical company Roche.

In 1990 Jeffries moved to St Bartholomew’s Hospital Medical College, where he was appointed University of London Professor of Virology. At St Bartholomew’s Jeffries focused on the development of vaginal microbicides which could prevent the sexual transmission of HIV. In 1998 Jeffries was appointed academic and clinical head of Microbiology and Virology for the Barts and The London School of Medicine. He remained as head of service for Microbiology/Virology until his retirement from academic life in 2006.

Jeffries served as vice-president of the Royal College of Pathologists from 1999 to 2002, as chairman of the Expert Advisory Group on Aids from 2003 to 2005, and as chairman of the Association of British Insurers' Expert Working Group on HIV from 2005 to 2008.

== Publications ==
Jeffries' publications included Lecture Notes on Medical Virology (1987). He was joint-editor of the first two volumes of Current Topics in Aids (1987 and 1989) and co-editor of Viral Infections in Obstetrics and Gynaecology (1999).

== Awards ==
Jeffries was appointed a CBE in 2007.

== Personal life ==
Jeffries married Mary Bray, in 1966, with whom he had two sons and a daughter.

Jeffries' leisure interests included fly fishing, gardening and hill walking.
