= Opinion polling for the 1955 United Kingdom general election =

In the run–up to the 1955 general election, various polling organisations conducted opinion polling to gauge voting intention amongst the general public. Such polls, dating from the previous election in 1955 to polling day on 26 May 1955, are listed in this article.

== Graphical summaries ==
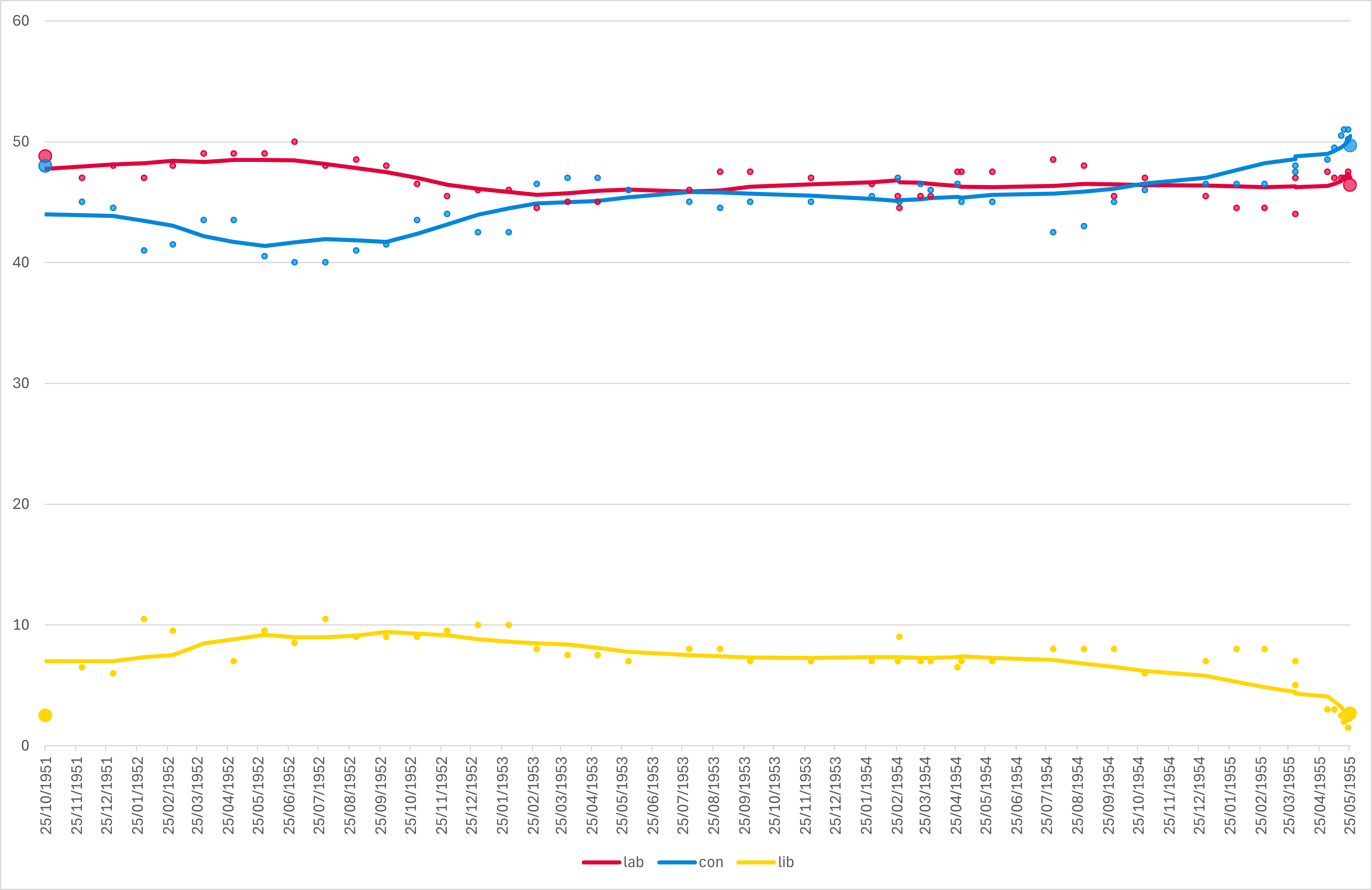
UK opinion polling for the 1955 election. The line is a moving average. Conservative Labour Liberal

== Polling results ==
In the run–up to the 1955 United Kingdom general elections, various organisations carry out opinion polling to gauge voting intention. Results of such polls are displayed in this article.

The date range for these opinion polls are from the 1951 general election until the 1955 general election.

All polling data is from PollBase

=== 1955 ===
| Date(s) Conducted | Pollster | Client | Lab | Con | Lib | Lead |
|---|---|---|---|---|---|---|
| 26 May | 1955 general election | | 46.4% | 49.7% | 2.7% | 3.3% |
| 21–24 May | Daily Express | | 47.2% | 50.2% | 2.2% | 3% |
| 21–24 May | Gallup | News Chronicle | 47.5% | 51% | 1.5% | 4.5% |
| 17–20 May | Gallup | News Chronicle | 47% | 51% | 2% | 4% |
| 15–17 May | Gallup | News Chronicle | 47% | 50.5% | 2.5% | 3.5% |
| 8–10 May | Gallup | News Chronicle | 47% | 49.5% | 3% | 2.5% |
| 1–3 May | Gallup | News Chronicle | 47.5% | 48.5% | 3% | 1% |
| Apr | Gallup | News Chronicle | 47% | 47.5% | 5% | 0.5% |
| Apr | Gallup | News Chronicle | 44% | 48% | 7% | 4% |
| Mar | Gallup | News Chronicle | 44.5% | 46.5% | 8% | 2% |
| Feb | Gallup | News Chronicle | 44.5% | 46.5% | 8% | 2% |
| Jan | Gallup | News Chronicle | 45.5% | 46.5% | 7% | 1% |

=== 1954 ===
| Date(s) Conducted | Pollster | Client | Lab | Con | Lib | Lead |
|---|---|---|---|---|---|---|
| Nov | Gallup | News Chronicle | 47% | 46% | 6% | 1% |
| Oct | Gallup | News Chronicle | 45.5% | 45% | 8% | 0.5% |
| Sep | Gallup | News Chronicle | 48% | 43% | 8% | 5% |
| Aug | Gallup | News Chronicle | 48.5% | 42.5% | 8% | 6% |
| Jun | Gallup | News Chronicle | 47.5% | 45% | 7% | 2.5% |
| May | Gallup | News Chronicle | 47.5% | 45.5% | 6.5% | 2% |
| 16–27 Apr | Gallup | News Chronicle | 46% | 46.5% | 7% | 0.5% |
| 31 Mar | Gallup | News Chronicle | 45.5% | 46% | 7% | 0.5% |
| 20–21 Mar | Gallup | News Chronicle | 45.5% | 46.5% | 7% | 1% |
| 26 Feb | Gallup | News Chronicle | 45.5% | 47% | 7% | 1.5% |
| 18–28 Feb | Gallup | News Chronicle | 44.5% | 45% | 9% | 0.5% |
| 21–31 Jan | Gallup | News Chronicle | 46.5% | 45.5% | 7% | 1% |

=== 1953 ===
| Date(s) Conducted | Pollster | Client | Lab | Con | Lib | Lead |
|---|---|---|---|---|---|---|
| Dec | Gallup | News Chronicle | 47% | 45% | 7% | 2% |
| Oct | Gallup | News Chronicle | 47.5% | 45% | 7% | 2.5% |
| Sep | Gallup | News Chronicle | 47.5% | 44.5% | 8% | 3% |
| Aug | Gallup | News Chronicle | 46% | 45% | 8% | 1% |
| Jun | Gallup | News Chronicle | 46% | 46% | 7% | Tie |
| May | Gallup | News Chronicle | 45% | 47% | 7.5% | 2% |
| Apr | Gallup | News Chronicle | 45% | 47% | 7.5% | 2% |
| Mar | Gallup | News Chronicle | 44.5% | 46.5% | 8% | 2% |
| Feb | Gallup | News Chronicle | 46% | 42.5% | 10% | 3.5% |
| Jan | Gallup | News Chronicle | 46% | 42.5% | 10% | 3.5% |

=== 1952 ===
| Date(s) Conducted | Pollster | Client | Lab | Con | Lib | Lead |
|---|---|---|---|---|---|---|
| Dec | Gallup | News Chronicle | 45.5% | 44% | 9.5% | 1.5% |
| Nov | Gallup | News Chronicle | 46.5% | 43.5% | 9% | 3% |
| Oct | Gallup | News Chronicle | 48% | 41.5% | 9% | 6.5% |
| Sep | Gallup | News Chronicle | 48.5% | 41% | 9% | 7.5% |
| Aug | Gallup | News Chronicle | 48% | 40% | 10.5% | 8% |
| July | Gallup | News Chronicle | 50% | 40% | 8.5% | 10% |
| Jun | Gallup | News Chronicle | 49% | 40.5% | 9.5% | 8.5% |
| May | Gallup | News Chronicle | 49% | 43.5% | 7% | 5.5% |
| Apr | Gallup | News Chronicle | 49% | 43.5% | – | 5.5% |
| Mar | Gallup | News Chronicle | 48% | 41.5% | 9.5% | 6.5% |
| Feb | Gallup | News Chronicle | 47% | 41% | 10.5% | 6% |
| Jan | Gallup | News Chronicle | 48% | 44.5% | 6% | 3.5% |

=== 1951 ===
| Date(s) Conducted | Pollster | Client | Lab | Con | Lib | Lead |
|---|---|---|---|---|---|---|
| Dec | Gallup | News Chronicle | 47% | 45% | 6.5% | 2% |
| 25 Oct | 1951 general election | | 48.8% | 48% | 2.5% | 0.8% |
