= Arthur Jenkins (British politician) =

Welsh politician (1884–1946)

Parliamentary Secretary to the Ministry of Education
- In office 4 August 1945 – 30 October 1945
- Prime Minister: Clement Attlee
- Preceded by: Thelma Cazalet-Keir
- Succeeded by: David Hardman

Member of Parliament for Pontypool
- In office 14 November 1935 – 25 April 1946
- Preceded by: Thomas Griffiths
- Succeeded by: Daniel Granville West

Personal details
- Born: 3 February 1882 Varteg, Monmouthshire, Wales
- Died: 25 April 1946 (aged 64) St Thomas's Hospital, Lambeth, London, England
- Party: Labour
- Spouse: Hattie Harris (m. 1911)
- Children: 1, Roy Jenkins
- Education: Ruskin College

Arthur Jenkins (3 February 1882 – 25 April 1946) was a Welsh coal-miner, trade unionist and Labour politician who served as vice-president of the South Wales Miners' Federation and MP for Pontypool. He was the father of the Labour (and later Liberal Democrat) politician Roy Jenkins.

== Early life and education ==
Jenkins was born at Varteg, near Abersychan in Monmouthshire to Thomas Jenkins and his wife, Eliza Perry. He left school at the age of 12 to work in the coal mine at Viponds, where he became actively engaged in trade union work. He attended night school, learning enough to gain a scholarship from the Eastern Valley Miners educational group to attend Ruskin College. In 1909 he went on strike over the dismissal of the militant Marxist teacher Dennis Hird. Partly in disgust at the way socialists were treated in higher education, he transferred to the Central Labour College, and from there to the campus in London. He had not completed his studies at Ruskin when he left for Paris to continue his studies there, at the Sorbonne.

In 1910 he returned to Wales to work as a miner and teach evening classes in the village of Garndiffaith.

== Family ==
On 2 October 1911 Jenkins married Hattie Harris (1886–1953), the daughter of a local steelworks manager from Blaenavon who worked in a music shop in Pontypool.

They had one son, Roy Harris Jenkins (1920–2003), who followed his father into politics, serving as Home Secretary and Chancellor of the Exchequer under Harold Wilson and later as President of the European Commission. In 1981 he helped to found the Social Democratic Party and later oversaw its merger with the Liberal Party to form the Liberal Democrats. He was also Chancellor of the University of Oxford.

== Trade union work and political career ==
Jenkins became active in local politics, representing the Labour Party on Monmouthshire County Council. He was also a strongly militant socialist, agitating for rapid and violent change. During the General Strike of 1926 he was arrested on disputed charges, hauled before the magistrate and sent to prison for nine months, although this did not prevent him from returning to the National Executive Committee of the Labour Party.

Throughout the 1920s and 1930s Jenkins continued to promote the sectional interests of miners and the Labour movement. He was the agent for the Eastern Valleys District of the South Wales Miners' Federation from 1921 to 1933 before serving as vice-president of the Federation.

At the 1935 general election he was chosen as the Labour Party candidate for Pontypool, one of the party's safest seats, to replace Thomas Griffiths. With the rise of totalitarian dictatorships during 1930s his interests spread from coal and unemployed miners to poverty more generally and education, as well as foreign affairs. In 1937 his views on rearmament and the threat of global conflict attracted the attention of the Labour leader, Clement Attlee, for whom he worked as Parliamentary Private Secretary.

In March 1945, during the wartime coalition, he was briefly appointed Parliamentary Secretary to the Ministry of Town and Country Planning. In the Attlee ministry, he became Parliamentary Secretary to the Ministry of Education. Suffering from illness, he was forced to retire from the Government in October 1945, so losing the opportunity to attain a Cabinet position.

He died at St Thomas' Hospital in London on 25 April 1946.

== Arthur Jenkins Indemnity Act 1941 ==
Arthur Jenkins Indemnity Act 1941 (Note: Section 2.)
- Act of Parliament
- Parliament of the United Kingdom
- Long title: An Act to indemnify Arthur Jenkins, Esquire, from any penal consequence which he may have incurred by sitting or voting as a Member of the House of Commons while holding the office of Chairman of the Local Appeal Board for a Royal Ordnance Factory and to remove any disqualification for membership of that House by reason of his having held that office.
- Citation: 5 & 6 Geo. 6. c. 1
- Introduced by: Winston Churchill (Commons)
- Territorial extent: United Kingdom

Dates
- Royal assent: 10 December 1941
- Commencement: 10 December 1941 (Note: The Acts of Parliament (Commencement) Act 1793.)
- Repealed: 18 December 1953

Other legislation
- Repealed by: Statute Law Revision Act 1953

Status: Repealed

Text of statute as originally enacted

During the Second World War Jenkins worked on industrial tribunals for the Royal Ordnance Factory, Glascoed, for which he needed legal dispensation from parliamentary privilege because he was an MP. He accepted the chairmanship of a local appeals board created under the Essential Work (General Provisions) Order, 1941, for ROF Glascoed. The role entitled him to a small payment per sitting, which, however, he did not accept. Nevertheless, the position was deemed to be an office for profit under the Crown, therefore leading to Jenkins vacating his seat in Parliament.

Although the House of Commons Disqualification (Temporary Provisions) Act 1941 had been brought in to remedy such situations, it applied to MPs who had accepted offices of profit between the start of the war and the passing of the Act. Jenkins took up the chairmanship of the appeals board after the Act was passed. The Act also permitted the Prime Minister to issue a certificate to an MP, to permit him or her to take up an office for profit without losing his or her seat. Unfortunately Jenkins had not done this before taking up the chairmanship, and therefore he was no longer an MP. The Conservative MP Sir William Davison remarked that "it does seem hard and unnecessary that he should be pilloried by losing his seat and incurring penalties".

The Arthur Jenkins Indemnity Act 1941 (5 & 6 Geo. 6. c. 1) was therefore enacted, which operated to restore Jenkins to his seat.

== Notes ==
Parliament of the United Kingdom
Preceded by Thomas Griffiths	Member of Parliament for Pontypool; 1935–1946	Succeeded by Daniel Granville West
Trade union offices
Preceded by James Winstone	Agent for the Eastern Valleys District of the South Wales Miners' Federation; 1921–1933	Succeeded by W. J. Saddler
Preceded by S. O. Davies	Vice-President of the South Wales Miners Federation; 1934–1935?	Succeeded by W. J. Saddler
