= Joan Abse =

British art historian, writer

Joan Abse (née Mercer; 11 September 1926 – 13 June 2005) was an English author and art historian. She was the wife of Welsh poet and physician Dannie Abse.

Joan Mercer was born in St Helens, Lancashire, on 11 September 1926. By age 17, she was a student at the London School of Economics (LSE), where she graduated in 1946 with a Bachelor of Science degree. Abse received a Master of Art degree in Art History in 1972 from Courtauld Institute of Art, London. She met her husband Dannie Abse while living in post-war London, and they married by 1951. They had three children.

She wrote many books, including John Ruskin: A Passionate Moralist. Richard Ellmann, who reviewed Abse's book for The New York Times, wrote, "What especially animates Joan Abse's book is her keen interest in Ruskin's effort to blend his artistic and social sympathies."

Joan Abse died in a car accident in Bridgend, south Wales, on 13 June 2005.

== Bibliography ==
Abse's books included:

- Abse, Joan (1975). The Art Galleries of Britain and Ireland: A Guide to their Collections. London, England: Robson Books Ltd. ISBN 978-0860513216.
- Abse, Joan (1977). My LSE (essays). London, England: Robson Books Ltd.
- Abse, Joan (1981). John Ruskin: A Passionate Moralist. New York: Alfred A. Knopf. ISBN 978-0394515960.
- Abse, Joan (2000). Letters from Wales. Seren. ISBN 978-1854112705.
- Abse, Joan; Abse, Dannie (2009). The Music Lover's Literary Companion (1 ed.). London, England: Jr Books Ltd. ISBN 978-1906779122.
