= Robert Nandor Berki =

Hungarian-British political scientist

- Born: 12 July 1936; Budapest
- Died: 17 September 1991 (aged 55)
- Occupation: Political scientist, university teacher
- Employer: University of Hull (1967–1991)

Robert Nandor Berki (1936–1991), who published as R. N. Berki, was a Hungarian-British political scientist.

== Life ==
Berki was born on 12 July 1936 in Budapest, and educated from 1941 to 1952 at the Catholic Piarista Convent School in Budapest. After working for a year in the Hungarian government's land redistribution department, he studied classical music and jazz at a Budapest music academy. Escaping Hungary after the Hungarian Revolution of 1956, he managed to get to Britain in 1957.

Attending evening classes, Berki gained O- and A-levels, and entered London School of Economics in 1961, securing a first-class degree in international relations in 1964. In 1962 he married Etelka Taph, also Hungarian, whom he had met at a jazz club in Stalintown near Budapest. He gained his PhD from Cambridge University, writing a thesis supervised by E. H. Carr on the political thought of Hegel and Marx.

In 1967 Berki became a lecturer in politics at the University of Hull. He stayed there until his death, becoming professor of European political and social theory and director of the Institute of European Studies in 1984. He died of a brain haemorrhage in Hull on 17 September 1991.

== Works ==
- (ed. with Bhikhu Parekh) The morality of politics. London: Allen and Unwin, 1972.
- (ed. with Robert Benewick and Bhikhu Parekh) Knowledge and belief in politics; the problem of ideology. London: Allen & Unwin, 1973.
- The history of political thought: a short introduction. London: Dent, 1974.
- Socialism. New York: St. Martin's Press, 1975.
- (ed. with Jack Hayward) State and society in contemporary Europe. New York: St. Martin's Press, 1979.
- On political realism. London: Dent, 1981.
- Insight and vision: the problem of communism in Marx's thought. London: J. M. Dent, 1983.
- Security and society: reflections on law, order and politics. London: Dent, 1986.
- The genesis of Marxism: four lectures. London: Dent, 1988.
