= Granville West, Baron Granville-West =

The Right Honourable The Lord Granville-West

Personal details
- Born: Daniel Granville West; 17 March 1904 Newbridge, Wales
- Died: 23 September 1984 (aged 80) Pontypool, Wales
- Resting place: Panteg Cemetery
- Party: Labour
- Occupation: Politician

Daniel Granville West, Baron Granville-West (17 March 1904 – 23 September 1984) was a British Labour politician. After establishing a successful solicitors practice, guided by Welsh baptist principles, he became a leading socialist in the post-war era. Baptised at the Tabernacle English Baptist Church, Monmouthshire, he remained a dedicated member all his life. Prominent in the opposition party during the Gaitskell period in the 1950s and early 1960s, he remained committed to law and order in Wales, and the nationalisation of the rail industry. He was horrified by the legacy of Imperial decline which he blamed for growing unemployment in the valleys.

Born to John West and Elizabeth Bridges in Newbridge, Monmouthshire. West was educated at Newbridge Grammar School and studied law at the University College of Wales where he took the departmental first prize. Qualifying in 1929, he worked as a solicitor. A successful practice in Newbridge and Pontypool, Chivers and Morgan Solicitors acted as a financial and legal springboard for a political career. A strong Baptist tradition continued to have a significant presence in the Liberal and Labour parties during the early part of the Twentieth century. Granville-West was an advocate of nonconformist education as Sunday School Superintendent; and in his practice was the Solicitor to Monmouthshire Welsh Baptist Association. When war broke out he was already a prominent local personage serving as a councillor on Monmouthshire County Council 1939–47. During World War II, he served in the Royal Air Force Volunteer Reserve, being promoted to Flight Lieutenant.

West gained political experience between the wars in Abercarn Urban District Council from 1934 to 1938, before being made a County Councillor. After the war ended he was demobilised and returned to the legal profession. He was rejoined by partner Emrys Morgan forming the firm Granville-West and Morgan. Encouraged by the Attlee government to seek a seat in parliament, he alighted on Pontypool because the firm had taken over Harold Saunders practice in 1943, providing a unique opportunity in a safe Labour area.

West was elected as Member of Parliament (MP) for Pontypool in a by-election in July 1946. He was appointed Parliamentary Private Secretary to James Chuter Ede, Home Secretary, in 1950, but the next year Labour lost the general election. He was also president of the South Wales and Monmouthshire branch of the Probation Officers Association and chairman of the Advisory Council on Civil Aviation in Wales. During the Suez Crisis he was strongly in favour of supporting Israel's stance against Egypt proposed by the Eden government. In the House he persistently asked questions about employment, the levels of unemployment, the jobless statistics and how the valleys might benefit from Development areas. He sought compensation for miners, their tenancies and, National Assistance for pensioners.

On 12 January 1937, he married Vera, daughter of J.Hopkins of Pontypool. They moved into Brynderwen, Abersychan, Pontypool, and had a son and a daughter.

In 1958 he was one of the first three Labour nominees chosen by leader Hugh Gaitskell to be created a life peer as Baron Granville-West, of Pontypool in the County of Monmouth by letters patent, and was succeeded as MP for Pontypool by Leo Abse. Lord Granville-West's maiden speech on 26 November 1958 tackled the issue of the Welsh language in schools. He was a strongly committed Welshman, passionate about 'Welshness' and the rights of countrymen. An advocate of industrial expansion in the South Wales valleys he opposed decline, promoting the cause of railway maintenance to the British Transport Commission. He hoped to attract new industries in the 'white heat of technology', having opposed the Beeching cuts. During 1970s industrial decline was accompanied by a shortage of decent housing. Lord Granville-West evolved into a moderniser supporting the enfranchisement of leaseholders to allow more working-class people to aspire to own their own home. Baron Granville-West died in Pontypool aged 80 and was buried at Panteg Cemetery, Pontypool.

Parliament of the United Kingdom
Preceded by Arthur Jenkins	Member of Parliament for Pontypool; 1946–1958	Succeeded by Leo Abse
Honorary titles
Preceded by The Lord Geddes of Epsom	Senior life peer 1983–1984	Succeeded by The Lord Taylor
