= 1946 Pontypool by-election =

UK Parliamentary by-election

The 1946 Pontypool by-election was a by-election held on 23 July 1946 for the British House of Commons constituency in Monmouthshire. The by-election was held due to the death of the incumbent Labour MP, Arthur Jenkins. It was won by the Labour candidate Granville West.

1946 Pontypool by-election
Party	Candidate	Votes	%	±%
Labour	Granville West	23,359	73.2	−4.1
Conservative	P. Welch	8,170	26.8	+4.1
Majority		15,189	46.4	−8.2
Turnout		31,529	65.8	−11.2
Registered electors		46,407		
Labour hold		Swing		
