= 1958 Pontypool by-election =

UK Parliamentary by-election

The 1958 Pontypool by-election was held on 10 November 1958 after the incumbent Labour MP, Granville West was elevated to a life peerage. The seat was retained by the Labour candidate Leo Abse.

== Result ==
1958 Pontypool by-election
Party	Candidate	Votes	%	±%
Labour	Leo Abse	20,000	68.5	−4.4
Conservative	Paul S. Thomas	6,273	21.5	−5.6
Plaid Cymru	Benjamin C.L. Morgan	2,927	10.0	N/A
Majority		13,727	47.0	+1.2
Turnout		29,200	61.7	−15.4
Registered electors		47,332		
Labour hold		Swing		
