= Tobias Abse =

British historian

- Born: 1956 or 1957 (age 69–70)
- Other name: Toby
- Occupation: Historian
- Board member of: Revolutionary History
- Parent(s): Marjorie Davies and Leo Abse

Academic background
- Education: William Ellis School; Gonville and Caius College

Academic work
- Discipline: History
- Sub-discipline: Political history
- Institutions: Goldsmiths
- Main interests: Italian fascism
- Website: Publications by Tobias Abse at ResearchGate

Tobias Abse is a historian. He was a lecturer in the subject at Goldsmiths College of the University of London from 1994 to 2016.

Abse has written extensively on the rise of the fascism in Italy prior to World War II. He has been a member of the Socialist Alliance National Executive, the Alliance for Green Socialism National Committee, the Socialist History Society committee, and the Revolutionary History editorial board and is a regular contributor to British socialist newspapers and magazines. He was a founder member of Lewisham People Before Profit.

Abse is the son of the Labour MP and social reformer Leo Abse (1917–2008). He was educated at William Ellis School, Highgate, and Gonville and Caius College, Cambridge, where he graduated with a double-starred first-class degree in history in 1978.

He now lives with his wife in northern Italy.

== Publications ==
- Abse, Toby. 2007. The Moro Affair: Interpretations and Consequences. In: S. Gundle and L. Rinaldi, eds. Assassinations and Murder in Modern Italy Transformations in Society and Culture. Palgrave MacMillan, pp. 89–100. ISBN 1403983917
- Abse, Toby. 2006. Catholic-Jewish Relations in Italy from Unification to the Second Vatican Council (1870-1965). In: Philip J. Broadhead and Damien V. Keown, eds. Can Faiths Make Peace? Holy Wars and the Resolution of Religious Conflicts. I.B Tauris, pp. 107–123. ISBN 9781845112769
- Abse, Toby. 2005. Italy's Long Road to Austerity and the Paradoxes of Communism. In: B. Moss, ed. Monetary Union in Crisis: The European Union as a Neo-Liberal Construction. Palgrave Macmillan, pp. 249–265. ISBN 0333963172
- Abse, Toby. 2003. Palmiro Togliatti, Loyal Servant of Stalin. In: K. Flett and D. Renton, eds. New Approaches to Socialist History. New Clarion Press, pp. 30–48. ISBN 1873797419
