= Wilfred Abse =

Welsh psychiatrist

David Wilfred Abse (15 March 1915 – 4 November 2005) was a Welsh psychiatrist.

Abse was born in Cardiff and was the brother of poet Dannie Abse (1923–2014) and politician Leo Abse (1917–2008). During and after World War II, he served in the Royal Army Medical Corps. In 1941, he participated in the examination of the Nazi leader Rudolf Hess, who had been captured in Scotland during an unsuccessful peace mission. Abse was later stationed in India, eventually rising to the rank of Major.

A psychoanalyst, Abse received his medical training at the University of London before emigrating to the United States, where he became a professor of psychiatry at the University of North Carolina at Chapel Hill. He spent the greater part of his career in Charlottesville, Virginia, serving as a professor of psychiatry at the University of Virginia from 1962 until 1980. Abse was known for his work in group therapy and hysteria, and he contributed to the Journal of Nervous and Mental Disease. It was said that his younger brother Leo developed his habit of Freudian allusion in his speeches from Wilfred.

Abse's work in group analysis was influenced by S.H. Foulkes, who was also based in London at the time. Abse wrote that in group-analytic psychotherapy, each patient's unconscious defence struggle becomes manifest, producing unconscious regression. Feelings about early figures from childhood are aroused and, through transference, fixed on the group leader (or conductor). Childish feelings of jealousy and rivalry lead participants to become concerned about which members in the group the group leader prefers.

== Selected works ==
- The diagnosis of hysteria (Williams and Wilkins, Baltimore, 1950)
- Speech and reason: language disorder in mental disease (John Wright, Bristol, 1971)
- Clinical notes on group-analytic psychotherapy (University Press of Virginia, Charlottesville, 1974)
- Marital & sexual counseling in medical practice, edited by D. Wilfred Abse, Ethel M. Nash, Lois M.R. Louden (Harper & Row, Medical Dept., Hagerstown, 2nd edition, 1974)
- Hysteria and Related Mental Disorders : an approach to psychological medicine (Wright, Bristol, 1987)
