= Dannie Abse =

Welsh poet and physician (1923–2014)

Dannie Abse CBE FRSL
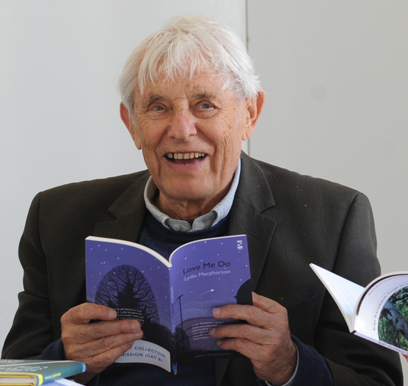
- Abse in May 2014
- Born: Daniel Abse; 22 September 1923; Cardiff, Wales
- Died: 28 September 2014 (aged 91); London, England
- Education: University of Wales College of Medicine; King's College London; Westminster Hospital Medical School
- Spouse: Joan Abse
- Writing career
- Genre: Poetry
- Notable awards: Cholmondeley Award; Wilfred Owen Poetry Award; Hippocrates Prize for Poetry and Medicine

Daniel Abse CBE FRSL (22 September 1923 – 28 September 2014) was a Welsh poet and physician. His poetry won him many awards. As a medic, he worked in a chest clinic for over 30 years.

== Early years ==
Abse was born in Cardiff, Wales, as the younger brother of the politician and reformer Leo Abse and the eminent psychoanalyst Wilfred Abse. Unusually for a middle-class Jewish boy, Dannie Abse attended St Illtyd's College, a working-class Catholic school in Splott. Abse studied medicine, first at the University of Wales College of Medicine and then at Westminster Hospital Medical School and King's College London.

Abse was a passionate supporter of Cardiff City football club. He first went to watch them play in 1934 and many of his writings refer to his experiences watching and lifelong love of the team known as "The Bluebirds".

== Career as poet ==
Abse worked in the medical field, and was a physician in a chest clinic for over thirty years, but he is best known as a poet. He received numerous literary awards and fellowships for his writing. In 1989, he received an honorary doctorate from the University of Wales.

His first volume of poetry, After Every Green Thing, was published in 1949. His autobiographic work, Ash on a Young Man's Sleeve, was published in 1954. He won the Welsh Arts Council Award in both 1971 and 1987, and the Cholmondeley Award in 1985. He was a Fellow of The Royal Society of Literature from 1983. In a foreword to Collected Poems 1948–1976, Abse noted that his poems are increasingly "rooted in actual experience," both domestic and professional, and many display a reconciliation between Jewish and Welsh themes and traditions.

Abse lived for several decades in the north-west area of London, mainly near Hampstead, where he had considerable ties. For several years he wrote a column for the local Hampstead and Highgate Express. These articles subsequently appeared in book form.

In 2005, his wife Joan was killed in a car accident, while Abse suffered a broken rib. His poetry collection, Running Late, was published in 2006, and The Presence, a memoir of the year after his wife died, was published in 2007; it won the 2008 Wales Book of the Year award. The book was later dramatised for BBC Radio 4. He was awarded the Roland Mathias prize for Running Late.

In 2009, Abse brought out a volume of collected poetry. In the same year, he received the Wilfred Owen Poetry Award. Abse was a judge for the inaugural 2010 Hippocrates Prize for Poetry and Medicine. Abse was appointed Commander of the Order of the British Empire (CBE) in the 2012 New Year Honours for services to poetry and literature.

Abse died at his home in London on 28 September 2014, six days after his 91st birthday.

== Books ==
- After Every Green Thing, Hutchinson, 1948
- Walking Under Water, Hutchinson, 1952
- Fire in Heaven, Hutchinson, 1956
- Mavericks: An Anthology, ed. with Howard Sergeant, Editions Poetry and Poverty, 1957
- Tenants of the House: Poems 1951–1956, Hutchinson, 1957
- Poems, Golders Green, Hutchinson, 1962
- Poems! Dannie Abse: A Selection, Vista/Dufour, 1963
- Modern European Verse, ed., Vista, 1964
- Medicine on Trial, Aldus, 1967
- Three Questor Plays, Scorpion, 1967
- A Small Desperation, Hutchinson, 1968
- Demo Sceptre, 1969
- Selected Poems, Hutchinson, 1970
- Modern Poets in Focus 1, ed., Corgi, 1971
- Modern Poets in Focus 3, ed., Corgi, 1971
- Thirteen Poets, ed., Poetry Book Society, 1972
- Funland and Other Poems, Hutchinson, 1973
- Modern Poets in Focus 5, ed., Corgi, 1973
- The Dogs of Pavlov, Vallentine, Mitchell, 1973
- A Poet in the Family, Hutchinson, 1974
- Penguin Modern Poets 26, with Dannie Abse, D. J. Enright and Michael Longley, Penguin, 1975
- Collected Poems 1948–1976, Hutchinson, 1977
- More Words, BBC, 1977
- My Medical School, Robson, 1978
- Pythagoras, Hutchinson, 1979
- Way Out in the Centre, Hutchinson, 1981
- A Strong Dose of Myself, Hutchinson, 1983
- One-legged on ice: poems, University of Georgia Press, 1983
- Doctors and Patients ed., Oxford University Press, 1984
- Ask the Bloody Horse, Hutchinson, 1986
- Journals From the Ant Heap, Hutchinson, 1986
- Voices in the Gallery: Poems and Pictures, ed. with Joan Abse, Tate Gallery, 1986
- The Music Lover's Literary Companion, ed. with Joan Abse, Robson, 1988
- The Hutchinson Book of Post-War British Poetry, ed., Hutchinson, 1989
- White Coat, Purple Coat: Collected Poems 1948–1988, Hutchinson, 1989
- People, contributor, National Language Unit of Wales, 1990
- Remembrance of Crimes Past: Poems 1986–1989, Hutchinson, 1990
- The View from Row G: Three Plays, Seren, 1990
- Intermittent Journals, Seren, 1994
- On the Evening Road, Hutchinson, 1994
- Selected Poems, Penguin, 1994
- The Gregory Anthology 1991–1993, ed. with A. Stevenson, Sinclair-Stevenson, 1994
- Twentieth-Century Anglo-Welsh Poetry, ed., Seren, 1997
- Welsh Retrospective, Seren, 1997
- Arcadia, One Mile, Hutchinson, 1998
- Be seated, thou: poems 1989–1998, Sheep Meadow Press, 1999
- Encounters Hearing Eye, 2001
- Goodbye, Twentieth Century: An Autobiography, Pimlico, 2001
- New and Collected Poems, Hutchinson, 2002
- The Two Roads Taken: A Prose Miscellany, Enitharmon Press, 2003
- Yellow Bird, Sheep Meadow Press, 2004
- Running Late, Hutchinson, 2006
- 100 Great Poems of Love and Lust: Homage to Eros, compiler/ed., Robson, 2007
- The Presence, Hutchinson, 2007
- New Selected Poems 1949–2009: Anniversary Collection, Hutchinson, 2009 (shortlisted for Ted Hughes Award for New Work in Poetry)
- Speak, Old Parrot, Hutchinson, 2013
- Ask the Moon: New and collected poems 1948–2014, Hutchinson, 2014

=== Fiction ===
- Ash on a Young Man's Sleeve, Hutchinson, 1954
- Some Corner of an English Field, Hutchinson, 1956
- O Jones, O Jones, Hutchinson, 1970
- There Was A Young Man From Cardiff, Hutchinson, 1991
- The Strange Case of Dr Simmonds & Dr Glas, Robson, 2002

== Plays ==
- Fire in Heaven (produced London, 1948), retitled Is the House Shut (1964) and In the Cage (1967)
- Hands Around the Wall (produced London, 1950)
- House of Cowards (produced London, 1960)
- The Eccentric (produced London, 1961)
- Gone (produced London, 1962)
- The Joker (produced, London, 1962), retitled The Courting of Essie Glass (1981)
- The Dogs of Pavlov (produced London, 1969)
- Funland (produced London, 1975)
- Pythagoras (produced Birmingham, 1976), retitled Pythagoras (Smith)

=== Published plays ===
- — (1967). Three Questor Plays. Lowestoft Suffolk: Scorpion Press. ISBN 9780851030104. – includes House of Cowards, Gone and In the Cage
- — (1990). The view from Row G: three plays. Bridgend: Seren. ISBN 1854110225. – includes House of Cowards, The Dogs of Pavlov and Pythagoras (Smith)

== Radio plays ==
- Conform or Die (1957)
- No Telegrams, No Thunder (1962)
- You Can't Say Hello to Anybody (1964)
- A Small Explosion (1964)
- The Courting of Elsie Glass (1975)
