= 1955 United Kingdom general election =

- 26 May 1955

All 630 seats in the House of Commons 316 seats needed for a majority
- Opinion polls
- Registered: 34,862,179
- Turnout: 26,759,729; 76.8% (▼5.8 pp)
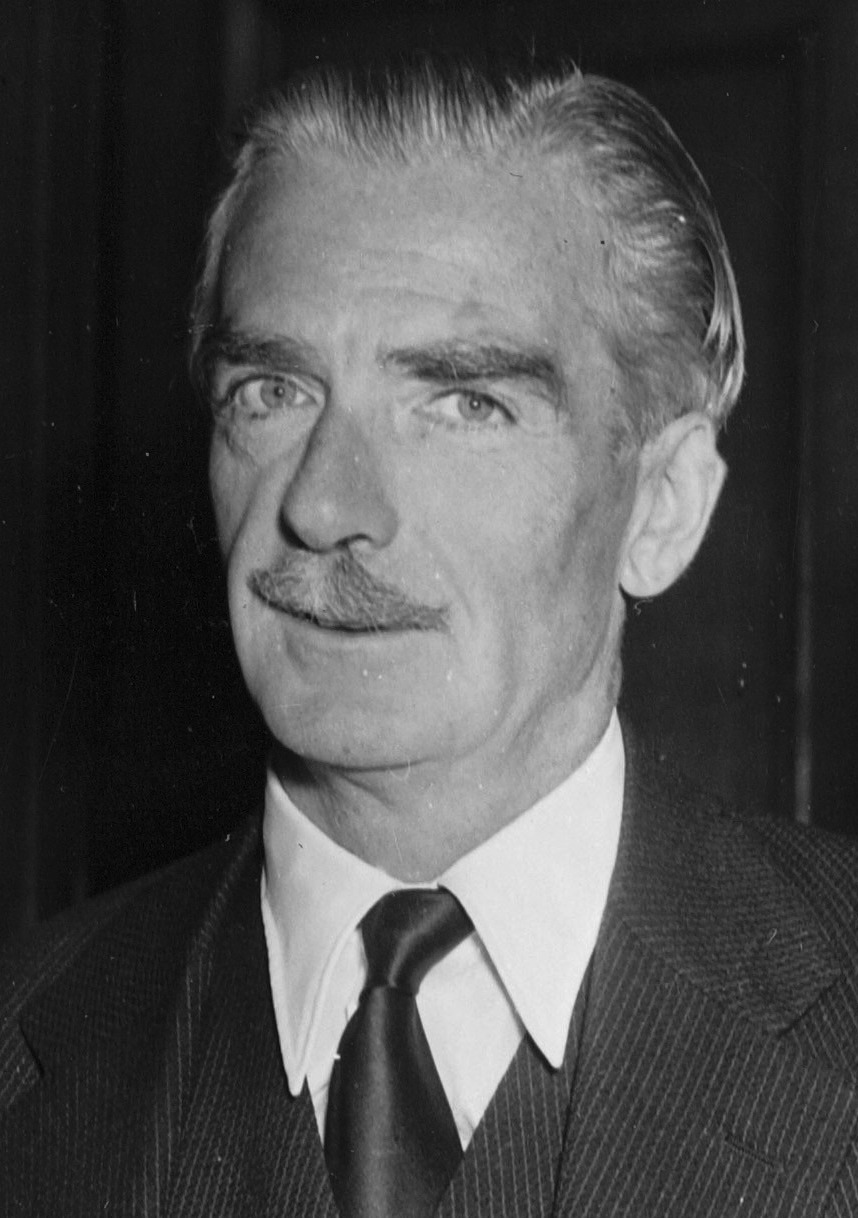

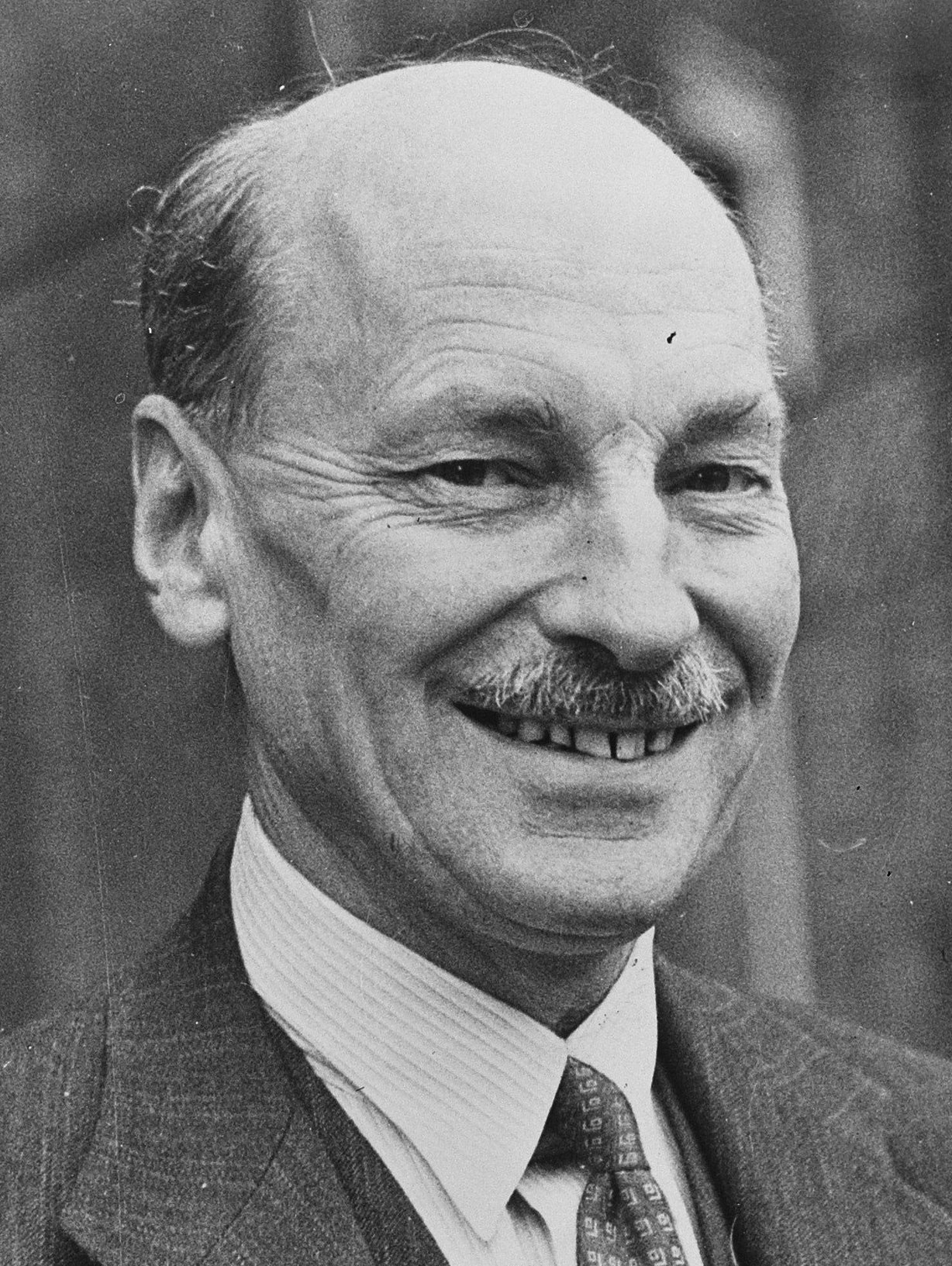

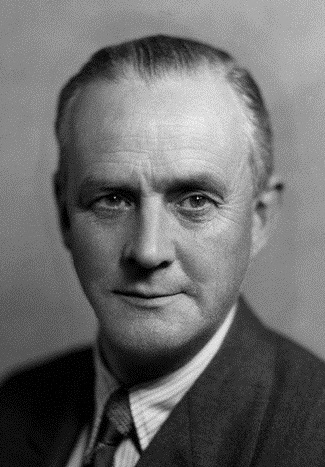
	First party	Second party	Third party
Leader	Anthony Eden	Clement Attlee	Clement Davies
Party	Conservative	Labour	Liberal
Leader since	7 April 1955	25 October 1935	2 August 1945
Leader's seat	Warwick and Leamington	Walthamstow West	Montgomeryshire
Last election	321 seats, 48.0%	295 seats, 48.8%	6 seats, 2.6%
Seats won	345 (Note: Figure includes Speaker of the House of Commons William Morrison in Cirencester and Tewkesbury.)	277	6
Seat change	▲24	▼18	Steady
Popular vote	13,310,891	12,405,254	722,402
Percentage	49.7%	46.4%	2.7%
Swing	▲1.7 pp	▼2.4 pp	▲0.1 pp
- Colours denote the winning party—as shown in § Results

- Composition of the House of Commons after the election
Prime Minister before election
Anthony Eden
Conservative
Prime Minister after election
Anthony Eden
Conservative

A general election was held in the United Kingdom on Thursday 26 May 1955. It was a snap election: Anthony Eden called the election after succeeding Winston Churchill in April 1955 to secure a mandate. The government won a 60-seat majority, achieving the highest post-war party vote share. It was the first election under Queen Elizabeth II.

== Background and campaign ==
In 1951, the Conservative Party had returned to power for the first time since World War II and increased its popularity by accepting the mixed economy and welfare state created by the previous Labour Party government. It also was lauded for its economic policy after ending rationing, improving foreign trade, and even outperforming Labour in the construction of public housing. The "giveaway budget" of Chancellor Rab Butler prior to the election also improved the popularity of the Conservative Party. On election day, the Daily Mirror had printed the front-page headline "Don't Let the Tories Cheat Our Children", urging its readers to elect Labour on the basis that it had "built a better Britain for us all".

The BBC later described the election as the "dullest" after World War II. The Daily Express wrote that the British people were more interested in Princess Margaret's romance with Peter Townsend. The Labour Party, then in its twentieth year of leadership under Clement Attlee, steadily lost ground owing to infighting between the left-wing (Bevanites) and the right-wing (Gaitskellites), resulting in an unclear election message. It pledged equal pay for women, renationalisation of the steel industry and road haulage, comprehensive secondary education, and vague guarantees of greater industrial democracy and workers' control of nationalised industries as demanded by Bevanites but otherwise offered little new policy. It was the fifth and last general election fought by Labour leader Clement Attlee, who by this time was 72 years old. Eden had only become Leader of the Conservative Party a few weeks before the election, following the retirement of former Prime Minister Winston Churchill, but he had long been considered the heir apparent to the Conservative leadership. Eden called a dissolution of parliament and a new general election as soon as he took office in April 1955. The Conservatives were hoping to take advantage of the end of food rationing and the positive atmosphere created by the coronation of Elizabeth II in 1953. Eden himself was telegenic (although not as great a public speaker as Churchill, who was now infirm and 80 years old) and gradual economic growth benefited the party greatly. Parliament was dissolved on 6 May.

The election was fought on new boundaries, with five seats added to the 625 fought in 1951.

== Aftermath ==
The result showed very little change from 1951, with fewer than 25 seats changing hands and only a small swing from Labour to the Conservatives. The only real highlight of the night was in Northern Ireland, where Sinn Féin won two seats at a UK election for the first time since 1918 (before the partition of Ireland).

The Labour Party suffered at this time from deep internal divisions, yet for it this election was not the disaster it could have been.

Although little changed, this was a strong victory for the Conservatives, who won the largest share of seats for a single party at a post-war general election. It became the first party since the passage of the Reform Act 1867 to increase its parliamentary majority after a term in office.

The Liberal Party had yet another poor performance, only slightly improving their popular vote total from the previous election, and again winning just six seats. Five of their six seats did not have Conservative challengers, as per local-level agreements to avoid vote-splitting which likely would have thrown the seats to Labour; the only Liberal candidate to be victorious against both Conservative and Labour challengers was Orkney and Shetland MP Jo Grimond, who was first elected in 1950. The poor national showing was widely viewed as the death knell for the embattled leadership of Clement Davies, who resigned the following year and was replaced by Grimond.

Future Labour leader Michael Foot lost his seat of Plymouth Devonport at this election; he returned for Ebbw Vale at a 1960 by-election.

For the first time, television took a prominent role in the campaign; this is the earliest UK general election of which television coverage survives (the 1950 and 1951 election nights were broadcast on television live, but the footage was not recorded). Only three hours of the coverage, presented by Richard Dimbleby, was kept; this was rebroadcast on BBC Parliament on the fiftieth and sixtieth anniversaries of the date of the election.

== Results ==
=== Summary of seats returned ===
Party	Leader	MPs		Aggregate votes	
Party	Leader		Of total		Of total
Conservative and Unionist Party	Anthony Eden	345	54.8%	13,310,891	49.7%
Conservative Party (Note: Conservative and Unionist Party results for England and Wales.)	Anthony Eden	284	45.1%	10,969,922	41.0%
Unionist Party	James Stuart	30	4.8%	1,056,209	3.9%
National Liberal Party	John Maclay	21	3.3%	842,113	3.1%
Ulster Unionist Party	Basil Brooke	10	1.6%	442,647	1.7%
Labour Party	Clement Attlee	277 (Note: Includes 19 Co-operative Party MP, as part of the Labour-Co-op alliance.)	44.0%	12,405,254	46.4%
Liberal Party	Clement Davies	6	1.0%	722,402	2.7%
Sinn Féin	Paddy McLogan	2	0.3%	152,310	0.6%

=== Full results ===

Results of the May 1955 general election to the House of Commons of the United Kingdom
Party	Leader	Candidates	MPs					Aggregate votes		
Party	Leader	Candidates	Total	Gains	Losses	Net	Of total (%)	Total	Of total (%)	Change (%)
Conservative (Total)	Anthony; Eden	624	345	30	6	▲24	54.8	13,310,891	49.7	▲1.7
Conservative (Note: Figure includes the Unionist Party and the Ulster Unionist Party under their nation affiliations with the Conservative Party.)	Anthony; Eden	579	324	28	6	▲22	54.1	12,468,778	46.6	▲2.3
National Liberal	John; Maclay	45	21	2	0	▲2	3.3	842,113	3.1	▼0.6
Labour	Clement; Attlee	617 (Note: Includes 39 Co-operative Party candidates, as part of the Labour-Co-op alliance.)	295 (Note: Includes 19 Co-operative Party MPs, as part of the Labour-Co-op alliance.)	9	27	▼18 (Note: Includes ▲3 Co-operative Party MPs, as part of the Labour-Co-op alliance.)	44.0 (Note: Includes 3.0% for the Co-operative Party, as part of the Labour-Co-op alliance.)	13,948,883 (Note: Includes 829,175 for the Co-operative Party, as part of the Labour-Co-op alliance.)	46.4 (Note: Includes 3.1% for the Co-operative Party, as part of the Labour-Co-op alliance.)	▼2.4 (Note: Includes ▲0.2% for the Co-operative Party, as part of the Labour-Co-op alliance.)
Liberal	Clement; Davies	110	6	0	0	Steady	1.0	730,546	2.7	▲0.1
Sinn Féin	Paddy; McLogan	12	1	Did not stand in 1951		▲2	0.3	152,310	0.6	—N/a
Plaid Cymru	Gwynfor; Evans	11	0	0	0	Steady	—	45,119	0.2	▲0.2
Independent	—N/a	5	0	0	0	Steady	—	35,220	0.1	Steady
Communist	Harry; Pollitt	17	0	0	0	Steady	—	33,144	0.1	Steady
Independent Labour	—N/a	2	0	Did not stand in 1951			—	15,322	0.1	—N/a
Irish Labour	William; Norton	1	0	0	1	▼1	—	16,050	0.1	Steady
SNP	Robert; McIntyre	2	0	0	0	Steady	—	12,112	0.0	Steady
Independent; Liberal	—N/a	1	0	Did not stand in 1951			—	6,055	0.0	—N/a
Ind. Labour Party	Annie; Maxton	2	0	0	0	Steady	—	3,334	0.0	Steady
Independent; Peace	—N/a	1	0	New			—	2,148	0.0	New
Independent; Conservative	—N/a	1	0	0	0	Steady	—	368	0.0	Steady
Other non-contested		0	0	—N/a		▼2 (Note: 1 Independent Nationalist MP, and 1 Nationalist Party MP.)	—	0	0.0	—N/a
Total		1,409	630			▲5	100.0	26,759,729	100.0	0.0
Registered voters, and turnout								34,862,179	76.8	▼5.8

=== Votes summary ===
Popular vote
Conservative and Unionist	49.74%
Labour	46.36%
Liberal	2.70%
Others	1.20%

=== Seats summary ===
Parliamentary seats
Conservative and Unionist	54.76%
Labour	43.97%
Liberal	0.95%
Sinn Féin	0.32%

== Selected declarations ==
- First declaration: Cheltenham (Con: 24,259, Lab: 16,638; Con hold)
- Prime Minister's seat: Warwick and Leamington (Con: 29,979, Lab: 16,513; Con hold)

== Transfers of seats ==
- All comparisons are with the 1951 election.
  - In some cases the change is due to the MP defecting to the gaining party. Such circumstances are marked with a *.
  - In other circumstances the change is due to the seat having been won by the gaining party in a by-election in the intervening years, and then retained in 1955. Such circumstances are marked with a †. The parliament of 1951–55 only saw one by-election where a seat changed hands (Sunderland South), and unusually this was a gain for the party in government.

From	To	No.	Seats
Labour	Labour (HOLD)	many	Ashfield (replaced Broxtowe), Barons Court (replaced Hammersmith South), Blackburn (replaced Blackburn East), Fulham (replaced Fulham East), Glasgow Provan (replaced Glasgow Camlachie), Hackney Central (replaced Hackney South), Kingston upon Hull West (replaced Kingston upon Hull Central), Manchester Openshaw (replaced Droylsden), Midlothian (replaced Midlothian and Peebles), Nottingham North (replaced Nottingham East), Nottingham West (replaced Nottingham North West), Reading (replaced Reading South), Walsall North (replaced Walsall), et al.
Labour	National Liberal	2	Bradford West (replaced Bradford Central), Plymouth Devonport
Labour	Conservative	19	Ayrshire Central, Carlisle, Ealing North, Gloucestershire South, Gravesend, Halifax, Hornchurch, Leeds North East, Liverpool Kirkdale, Maldon, Nottingham Central, Nottingham South, Preston South, Southampton Test, Sunderland South†, Walthamstow East, Wandsworth Central, Watford, The Wrekin
Labour	abolished	6	Birmingham Erdington, Fulham West, Glasgow Tradeston, Leeds Central, Manchester Clayton, Sheffield Neepsend
Irish Labour	UUP	1	Belfast West
Nationalist	Sinn Féin	1	Fermanagh and South Tyrone^{2}
Ind. Republican	Sinn Féin	1	Mid Ulster^{1}
Liberal	Liberal (HOLD)	6	Bolton West, Cardiganshire, Carmarthen, Huddersfield West, Montgomery, Orkney and Shetland
National Liberal	National Liberal (HOLD)	17	Angus North and Mearns, Angus South, Bedfordshire South, Bradford North, Denbigh, Dumfriesshire, Fife East, Harwich, Holland with Boston, Huntingdonshire, Luton, Newcastle upon Tyne North, Norfolk Central, Renfrewshire West, Ross and Cromarty, St Ives, Torrington
Conservative	Labour	4	Bristol North West, Glasgow Govan, Norfolk South West, Romford
Conservative	Conservative (HOLD)	many	Birmingham Selly Oak (replaced Birmingham King's Norton), Croydon NE (replaced Croydon East), Croydon NW (replaced Croydon North), Croydon South (replaced Croydon West), Howden (replaced Beverley), Roxburgh, Selkirk and Peebles (replaced Roxburgh and Selkirk), Stroud (replaced Stroud and Thornbury), et al.
Conservative	Speaker		Cirencester and Tewkesbury*
Conservative	abolished	2	Blackburn West, Leeds North, Reading North
UUP	UUP	9	North Antrim, South Antrim, Armagh, Belfast East, Belfast North, Belfast South, Down North, Down South, Londonderry
Seat created	Labour	5	Birmingham All Saints, Erith and Crayford, Feltham, Leeds East, Meriden
Seat created	Conservative	9	Chigwell, Eastleigh, Essex South East, Glasgow Craigton, Hertfordshire East, Nantwich, Rye, Surbiton, Walsall South

^{1} Sinn Féin winner overturned on petition for a criminal conviction. The second-placed Ulster Unionist candidate was also overturned by resolution of the House; eventually the 1956 by-election was held, which returned an Independent Unionist.
^{2} Sinn Féin winner overturned on petition for a criminal conviction. The second-placed candidate, an Ulster Unionist, was awarded the seat.

== See also ==
- List of MPs elected in the 1955 United Kingdom general election
- 1955 United Kingdom general election in England
- 1955 United Kingdom general election in Scotland
- 1955 United Kingdom general election in Wales
- 1955 United Kingdom general election in Northern Ireland
- 1955 United Kingdom local elections
- List of MPs for constituencies in Scotland (1955–1959)
- List of MPs for constituencies in Wales (1955–1959)
