= Leo Abse =

Welsh lawyer and politician (1917–2008)

- 1967 portrait

Chair of the Welsh Affairs Select Committee
- In office 25 January 1980 – 20 November 1981
- Preceded by: Position Established
- Succeeded by: Donald Anderson

Member of Parliament for Torfaen Pontypool (1958–1983)
- In office 10 November 1958 – 18 May 1987
- Preceded by: Granville West
- Succeeded by: Paul Murphy

Member of Cardiff City Council
- In office 1953–1958

Personal details
- Born: Leopold Abse; 22 April 1917 Cardiff, Wales
- Died: 19 August 2008 (aged 91) London, England
- Party: Labour
- Education: London School of Economics
- Occupation: Author; MP; solicitor

Leopold Abse (22 April 1917 – 19 August 2008) was a Welsh lawyer and politician. He was a British Labour MP for nearly 30 years, noted for promoting private member's bills to decriminalise male homosexual relations and liberalise the divorce laws. During his parliamentary career, Abse introduced more private member's bills than any other parliamentarian in the 20th century. After his retirement from Parliament he wrote several books about politics, based on his interest in psychoanalysis.

== Family and background ==
Leo Abse was one of the sons of Rudolf Abse, a Jewish solicitor and cinema owner who lived in Cardiff. His maternal grandfather, Tobias, had emigrated to Wales from Siemiatycze, a Polish town then located within the Russian Empire. His grandmother came from Germany. Abse's younger brother Dannie Abse (1923–2014) was a poet, and his older brother Wilfred Abse (1915–2005) a psychoanalyst. He also had a sister, Hulda. Abse attended Howard Gardens High School in Cardiff and then the London School of Economics, where he studied law. Having joined the Labour Party in 1934, he clandestinely visited Spain during the closing months of the Spanish Civil War in 1939.

Abse married Marjorie Davies in 1955. They had two children: Tobias (now a Marxist historian) and Bathsheba. Marjorie died in 1996. His second marriage was to Ania Czepulkowska, in 2000, when Abse was 83 and Czepulkowska 33. Abse died on 19 August 2008. Some 10 years after her husband died, Mrs Czepulkowska-Abse broke her silence and spoke to the South Wales Argus and paid tribute to her husband. She confirmed that she was still living and working in London.

== Political involvement ==
During the Second World War Abse served in the Royal Air Force. He was in Cairo in 1944 when some of the British military personnel stationed there set up a "Forces Parliament" in which they debated the structure of society they wanted to see in the post-war world. Abse's idealistic left-wing views were fully in tune with the majority opinion among the lower ranks at its meetings, but the existence of the "Parliament" disturbed the senior officers. When Abse moved a motion supporting nationalization of the Bank of England he was arrested and the Forces Parliament was forcibly dissolved.

After the end of the war Abse set up in practice as a solicitor in Cardiff. In 1951 he established his own law firm, Leo Abse & Cohen, which eventually grew to be the biggest in the city. He was also elected as Chairman of Cardiff Labour Party for two years from 1951, relinquishing the post when he was elected to Cardiff City Council in 1953. Abse fought the safe Conservative seat of Cardiff North in the 1955 general election, and was defeated.

== In Parliament ==
Granville West, the Labour MP for Pontypool and, like Abse, a solicitor, was awarded one of the first life peerages in 1958. Unusually for a town in the South Wales valleys at that time, the National Union of Mineworkers was not in control of the nomination of West's successor as Labour candidate, since Pontypool was a centre of the railway industry. Abse won the candidature and then won the seat at the by-election.

In the House of Commons Abse swiftly acquired a reputation for independence of spirit. He made a point of dressing flamboyantly on Budget Day and liked to drop references from Freudian psychotherapy into his speeches. Abse made his maiden speech in the House of Commons on 22 January 1959 on the subject of education, mentioning that he had a primary school in his constituency which had two classes of over 50 pupils in one room. Although his abilities might have taken him to high office, Abse remained a backbench MP. This factor, together with the safety of his seat, freed him from the restrictions that dissuaded many other MPs from taking up controversial subjects.

In 1963, Abse was selected in third place in the ballot for Private Member's Bills and introduced the Matrimonial Causes Bill, which simplified and made easier the legal process of divorce.

In the mid-1960s, Abse began corresponding with members of the British Humanist Association and other MPs and peers who were non-religious and had shared ethical views and political ambitions. Together they founded the All-Party Parliamentary Humanist Group, whose concerns at that time included homosexual law reform, abortion law reform, and racial and religious equality.

In 1957 the Wolfenden Report had recommended that the law be changed to decriminalise consenting male homosexual sex, but the government had taken no action. Abse began to promote a Bill to put Wolfenden's recommendations into law in February 1962. He kept pressing the issue, and after Humphry Berkeley (Conservative MP for Lancaster) lost his seat in the 1966 general election, Abse became the main sponsor for the legalisation. Although with the Labour landslide of 1966 there was a majority for the bill, it was still vulnerable but Abse persuaded Roy Jenkins to give the measure government time, which eventually saw the bill through onto the statute book as the Sexual Offences Act 1967.

In 1968 he was appointed to a Home Office advisory committee on the penal system. He was elected Chairman of the group of Welsh Labour MPs in 1971.

In 1973, Abse requested that the government ban the rock singer Alice Cooper and his group from performing in England, stating that Cooper was "peddling the culture of the concentration camp". Abse said: "Pop is one thing, anthems of necrophilia are quite another".

Abse was chosen as chairman of a select committee on abortion from 1975 to 1977. His report advocated restrictions on abortion, including a lowering of the time limit within which abortion was legal from 28 weeks. He fought in the House of Commons for the enactment of his committee's recommendations, and continued the fight in 1980 when the Conservative MP John Corrie proposed a bill along similar lines: Abse refused to compromise on a limit of 24 weeks.

Abse was an opponent of devolution when it was proposed in the late 1970s. He also proposed a separate referendum on whether the Shetland Islands ought to be part of a devolved Scotland. Abse was briefly Chair of the Welsh Affairs Select Committee when it was first set up in January 1980, but resigned in November 1981. One of the reasons he opposed devolution was that he thought some in Wales, whom he called "fanatics", wanted to use it to promote the use of the Welsh language.

Abse added to his reputation for taking maverick stances by strongly urging that British forces be withdrawn from Northern Ireland. He opposed nuclear power and nuclear weapons, and criticised Margaret Thatcher for insisting that Argentina unconditionally surrender over the Falkland Islands. He supported British membership of the European Communities. His support for liberal divorce laws led him to propose a new 'child-centred' divorce reform in the early 1980s; the bill was piloted by Martin Stevens, Conservative MP for Fulham.

Abse was elected for the renamed seat of Torfaen in 1983, but retired from Parliament in 1987. His nomination for a seat in the House of Lords was vetoed by Margaret Thatcher.

== Retirement and later writings ==
The first of the books Abse wrote following retirement, Margaret, Daughter of Beatrice (1989), is a "psycho-biography" of Margaret Thatcher, taking its title from the observation that while Mrs Thatcher frequently referred to her father, she claimed not to have had anything to say to her mother from the age of 15.

In Wotan, My Enemy (1994) Abse took a psychoanalytic approach to explaining the origin of British hostility to Germany and the idea of the European Union. In The Man behind the Smile: Tony Blair and the Politics of Perversion (1996), Abse highlighted some of the aspects of Tony Blair that were later to be cited by Blair's opponents on the left. A revised edition, Tony Blair: The Man who Lost His Smile (2003), was published in the United States. In this edition Abse took the opportunity to claim that he had paid off a blackmailer who had been targeting a fellow Welsh MP George Thomas (Speaker of the House of Commons from 1976 to 1983), on the basis of Thomas's (closeted) homosexuality.

Finally, in Fellatio, Masochism, Politics and Love (1997), Abse drew attention to the fact that fellatio had been unspoken of a generation before but had come to be seen as an essential part of casual sexual relationships. He analysed the tendency for men to engage in risky behaviour by placing their trust in women whom they barely knew and linked it to political developments.

== Memorial ==
A bust of Abse was unveiled at the National Museum of Wales in Cardiff on 22 October 2009. The sculpture was funded by the firm of solicitors he founded, Leo Abse and Cohen, and was made by Abse's second cousin, Luke Shepherd.

== In popular culture ==
Abse was played by actor Anthony O'Donnell in the 2018 BBC One TV series A Very English Scandal.

== Publications ==
- Private Member (MacDonald, London, 1973)
- Margaret, Daughter of Beatrice (Jonathan Cape, London, 1989)
- Wotan, My Enemy (Robson Books, London, 1994)
- Tony Blair: The Man behind the Smile (Robson Books, London, 1996)
- Fellatio, Masochism, Politics and Love (Robson Books, London, 1997)
- Tony Blair: The Man who Lost his Smile (Robson Books, London, 2003)
- The Bi-sexuality of Daniel Defoe: a psychoanalytic survey of the man and his works (Karnac Books, London, 2006)

== Sources ==
- Goodman, Geoffrey (20 August 2008). "Leo Abse". The Guardian.

Parliament of the United Kingdom
Preceded by Granville West	Member of Parliament for Pontypool; 1958–1983	Constituency abolished
New constituency	Member of Parliament for Torfaen; 1983–1987	Succeeded by Paul Murphy
