= Initial Review of Westminster constituencies =

The Initial Review of Westminster constituencies was passed in 1948. It was the first review conducted following the passage of the House of Commons (Redistribution of Seats) Act 1944 which codified the rules governing the boundary review process within the UK.

== Changes in representation ==
The Initial Review introduced the following changes in parliamentary seats compared to 1945:

	1945	1948	Change
England	510	506	-4
Wales	35	36	+1
Scotland	71	71	0
N. Ireland	12	12	0
Universities	12	0	-12
Total	640	625	-15
