= List of elections in 1964 =

The following elections occurred in 1964.

== Africa ==
- 1964 Algerian parliamentary election
- 1964 Cameroonian parliamentary election
- 1964 Central African Republic parliamentary election
- 1964 Central African Republic presidential election
- 1964 Dahomeyan parliamentary election
- 1964 Dahomeyan constitutional referendum
- 1964 Gabonese legislative election
- 1964 Ghanaian constitutional referendum
- 1964 Libyan general election
- 1964 Malian parliamentary election
- 1964 Nigerian general election
- 1964 Northern Rhodesian general election
- 1964 Nyasaland general election
- 1964 Republic of the Congo (Léopoldville) constitutional referendum
- 1964 Somali parliamentary election
- 1964 Swazi parliamentary election
- 1964 Tunisian general election
- 1964 United Arab Republic parliamentary election

== Asia ==
- 1964 Afghan Constitutional Assembly election
- 1964 Lebanese general election
- 1964 Lebanese presidential election
- 1964 Malaysian general election
- 1964 Malaysian local elections
- 1964 North Vietnamese legislative election
- 1964 Taiwanese local elections
- 1964 United Arab Republic parliamentary election

== Australia ==
- 1964 Australian Senate election
- 1964 Denison by-election
- 1964 Parramatta by-election
- 1964 Robertson by-election
- 1964 Tasmanian state election
- 1964 Victorian state election
- 1964 Waratah state by-election
- 1964 Wollongong-Kembla state by-election

== Europe ==
- 1964 Czechoslovak parliamentary election
- 1964 Czechoslovak presidential election
- 1964 Danish parliamentary election
- 1964 Gibraltar general election
- 1964 Greek legislative election
- 1964 Icelandic presidential election
- 1964 Italian local elections
- 1964 Italian presidential election
- 1964 Luxembourg general election
- 1964 Maltese constitutional referendum
- 1964 San Marino general election
- 1964 Swedish general election
- 1964 Swiss referendums
- 1964 West German presidential election

=== France ===
- 1964 French cantonal elections

=== United Kingdom ===
- 1964 United Kingdom general election
  - England: 1964 United Kingdom general election in England
  - Scotland: 1964 United Kingdom general election in Scotland
  - Wales: 1964 United Kingdom general election in Wales
  - Northern Ireland: 1964 United Kingdom general election in Northern Ireland
  - List of MPs elected in the 1964 United Kingdom general election
- 1964 Greater London Council election
- 1964 London local elections
- 1964 Bury St Edmunds by-election
- 1964 Devizes by-election
- 1964 Faversham by-election
- 1964 Liverpool Scotland by-election
- 1964 Rutherglen by-election
- 1964 Winchester by-election
- 1964 United Kingdom local elections

==== United Kingdom local ====
- 1964 Lambeth Council election
- 1964 Lewisham Council election
- 1964 Newham Council election
- 1964 Southwark Council election

== North America ==
=== Canada ===
- 1964 Edmonton municipal election
- 1964 Northwest Territories general election
- 1964 Ottawa municipal election
- 1964 Saskatchewan general election
- 1964 Toronto municipal election
- 1964 Yukon general election

=== Caribbean ===
- 1964 Haitian constitutional referendum
- 1964 Haitian parliamentary election

=== Mexico ===
- 1964 Mexican general election

=== United States ===
- 1964 United States elections
- 1964 United States presidential election

==== United States lieutenant gubernatorial ====
- 1964 Delaware lieutenant gubernatorial election
- 1964 Illinois lieutenant gubernatorial election
- 1964 Louisiana lieutenant gubernatorial election
- 1964 Missouri lieutenant gubernatorial election
- 1964 Nebraska lieutenant gubernatorial election
- 1964 North Carolina lieutenant gubernatorial election
- 1964 Texas lieutenant gubernatorial election
- 1964 Wisconsin lieutenant gubernatorial election

==== United States gubernatorial ====
- 1964 Arizona gubernatorial election
- 1964 Arkansas gubernatorial election
- 1964 Delaware gubernatorial election
- 1964 Florida gubernatorial election
- 1964 Illinois gubernatorial election
- 1964 Indiana gubernatorial election
- 1964 Iowa gubernatorial election
- 1964 Kansas gubernatorial election
- 1964 Louisiana gubernatorial election
- 1964 Massachusetts gubernatorial election
- 1964 Michigan gubernatorial election
- 1964 Missouri gubernatorial election
- 1964 Montana gubernatorial election
- 1964 Nebraska gubernatorial election
- 1964 New Hampshire gubernatorial election
- 1964 New Mexico gubernatorial election
- 1964 North Carolina gubernatorial election
- 1964 North Dakota gubernatorial election
- 1964 Rhode Island gubernatorial election
- 1964 South Dakota gubernatorial election
- 1964 Texas gubernatorial election
- 1964 United States gubernatorial elections
- 1964 Utah gubernatorial election
- 1964 Vermont gubernatorial election
- 1964 Washington gubernatorial election
- 1964 West Virginia gubernatorial election
- 1964 Wisconsin gubernatorial election

==== United States House of Representatives ====
- 1964 United States House of Representatives elections

==== United States Senate ====
- 1964 United States Senate elections
- 1964 United States Senate election in Arizona
- 1964 United States Senate election in California
- 1964 United States Senate election in Connecticut
- 1964 United States Senate election in Delaware
- 1964 United States Senate election in Florida
- 1964 United States Senate election in Hawaii
- 1964 United States Senate election in Indiana
- 1964 United States Senate election in Maine
- 1964 United States Senate election in Maryland
- 1964 United States Senate election in Massachusetts
- 1964 United States Senate election in Michigan
- 1964 United States Senate election in Minnesota
- 1964 United States Senate election in Mississippi]
- 1964 United States Senate election in Missouri
- 1964 United States Senate election in Montana
- 1964 United States Senate election in Nebraska
- 1964 United States Senate election in Nevada
- 1964 United States Senate election in New Jersey
- 1964 United States Senate election in New Mexico
- 1964 United States Senate election in New York
- 1964 United States Senate election in North Dakota
- 1964 United States Senate election in Ohio
- 1964 United States Senate special election in Oklahoma
- 1964 United States Senate election in Pennsylvania
- 1964 United States Senate election in Rhode Island
- 1964 United States Senate special election in Tennessee
- 1964 United States Senate election in Tennessee
- 1964 United States Senate election in Texas
- 1964 United States Senate election in Utah
- 1964 United States Senate election in Vermont
- 1964 United States Senate election in Virginia
- 1964 United States Senate election in Washington
- 1964 United States Senate election in West Virginia
- 1964 United States Senate election in Wisconsin
- 1964 United States Senate election in Wyoming

==== United States mayoral elections ====
- 1964 Auburn, Alabama municipal elections
- 1964 Orlando mayoral election

== Oceania ==
=== Australia ===
- 1964 Australian Senate election
- 1964 Angas by-election
- 1964 Australian Senate election
- 1964 Denison by-election
- 1964 Lakemba state by-election
- 1964 Parramatta by-election
- 1964 Robertson by-election
- 1964 Tasmanian state election
- 1964 Victorian state election

== South America ==
- 1964 Bolivian general election
- 1964 Brazilian presidential election
- 1964 Chilean presidential election
- 1964 Colombian parliamentary election
- 1964 Falkland Islands general election
- 1964 Guatemalan Constitutional Assembly election
- 1964 Panamanian general election
- 1964 Salvadoran legislative election
