= Opinion polling for the 1964 United Kingdom general election =

In the run-up to the 1964 general election, various polling organisations conducted opinion polling to gauge voting intention amongst the general public. Such polls, dating from the previous election in 1959 to polling day on 15 October 1964, are listed in this article

== Graphical summaries ==
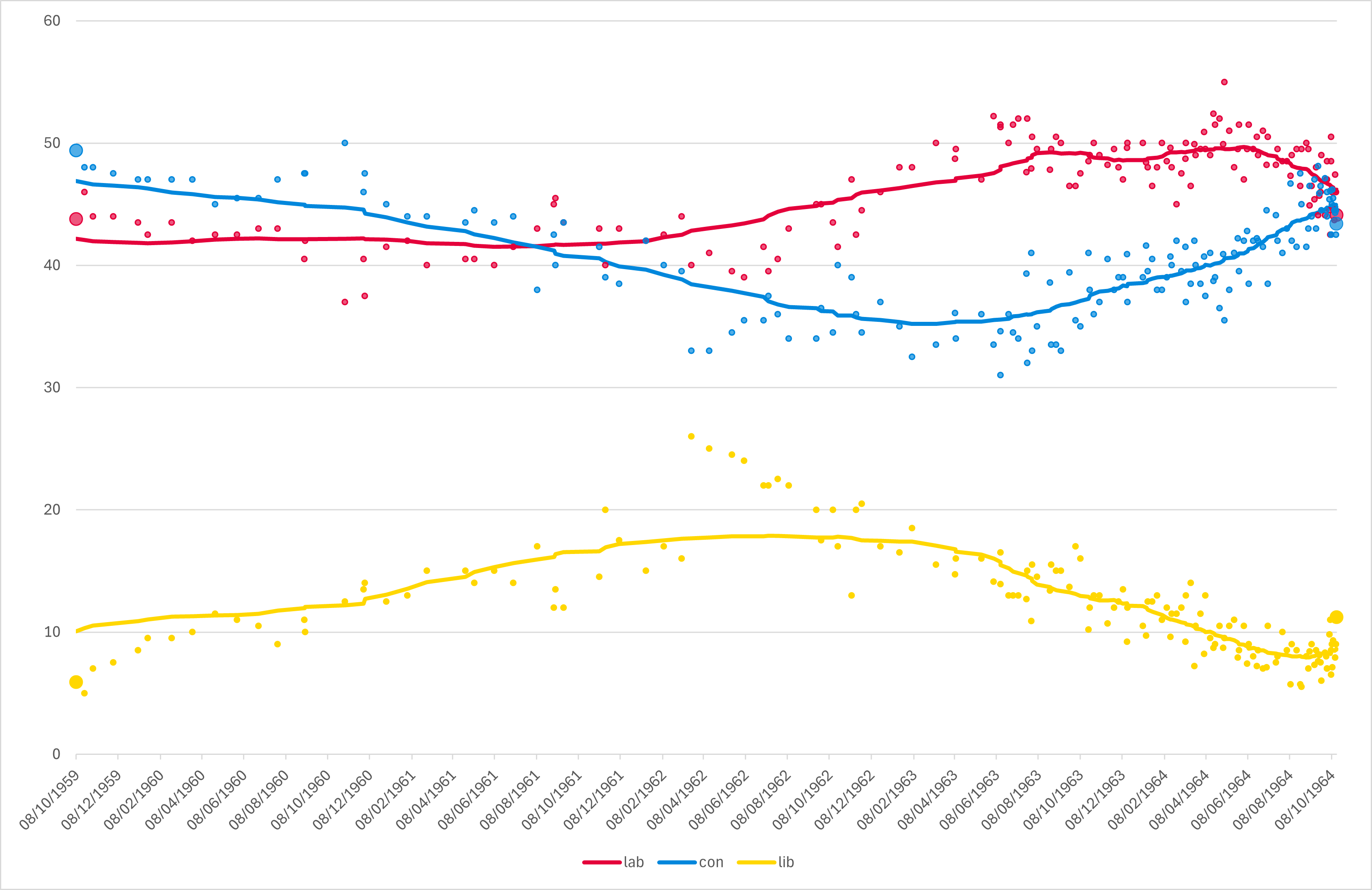
UK opinion polling for the 1964 election (40 poll moving average)

== Polling results ==
All Data is from PollBase

=== 1964 ===
Fieldwork	Polling Organisation	Con	Lab	Lib	Lead
15 Oct	General Election Results	43.4%	44.1%	11.2%	0.7%
Oct	Gallup	44.5%	46%	9%	1.5%
Oct	Gallup/Daily Telegraph	42.5%	46%	11%	3.5%
9–13 Oct	NOP/Daily Mail	44.3%	47.4%	7.9%	3.1%
Oct	Daily Express	44.5%	43.7%	11.1%	0.8%
Oct	Daily Express	45.5%	44.6%	9.3%	0.9%
5–9 Oct	NOP/Daily Mail	46.2%	46.3%	7.1%	0.1%
Oct	Research Services/Daily Graphic	45%	46%	9%	1%
Oct	Gallup	42.5%	50.5%	6.5%	8%
Oct	Gallup	42.5%	48.5%	8.5%	6%
Oct	Daily Express	46.1%	42.5%	11%	3.6%
1–5 Oct	NOP/Daily Mail	45.4%	44.5%	9.8%	0.9%
Oct	Research Services	46%	47%	7%	1%
Oct	Gallup/Daily Telegraph	44%	48.5%	7%	4.5%
Sep	Gallup/Daily Telegraph	44.5%	47%	8%	2.5%
24–28 Sep	NOP/Daily Mail	47.1%	44.1%	8.3%	3%
25 Sep	The 42nd Parliament is dissolved and campaigning officially begins				
Sep	Gallup	44.5%	49%	6%	4.5%
Sep	Gallup	46.5%	46%	7.5%	0.5%
17–20 Sep	NOP/Daily Mail	45.9%	45.7%	8.1%	0.2%
Sep	Daily Express	48.1%	44.1%	7.6%	4%
Sep	Gallup	43%	48%	8.5%	5%
10–13 Sep	NOP/Daily Mail	47%	45.4%	7.3%	1.6%
2–9 Sep	Gallup	44%	46.5%	9%	1.5%
3–6 Sep	NOP/Daily Mail	46.5%	44.9%	8.4%	1.6%
Sep	Gallup	43%	49.5%	7%	6.5%
27 Aug – 1 Sep	Gallup/Daily Telegraph	41.5%	50%	8%	8.5%
20–25 Aug	Gallup/Daily Telegraph	45%	49.5%	5.5%	4.5%
20–23 Aug	NOP/Daily Mail	47.5%	46.5%	5.7%	1%
13–18 Aug	Gallup/Daily Telegraph	41.5%	49.5%	8.5%	8%
6–11 Aug	Gallup/Daily Telegraph	42%	49%	9%	7%
6–9 Aug	NOP/Daily Mail	46.7%	47.3%	5.7%	0.6%
30 Jul – 4 Aug	Gallup/Daily Telegraph	43%	48.5%	8.5%	5.5%
22–28 Jul	Gallup/Daily Telegraph	41%	48.5%	10%	7.5%
9–21 Jul	Gallup/Daily Telegraph	42%	49.5%	8%	7.5%
16–19 Jul	NOP/Daily Mail	44.1%	48.2%	7.5%	4.1%
2–7 Jul	Gallup/Daily Telegraph	38.5%	50.5%	10.5%	12%
2–5 Jul	NOP/Daily Mail	44.5%	48.2%	7.1%	3.7%
25–30 Jun	Gallup/Daily Telegraph	41.5%	51%	7%	9.5%
17–23 Jun	Gallup/Daily Telegraph	42%	49%	8.5%	7%
18–21 Jun	NOP/Daily Mail	42.2%	50.5%	7.2%	8.3%
10–16 Jun	Gallup/Daily Telegraph	42%	49.5%	8%	7.5%
4–9 Jun	Gallup/Daily Telegraph	38.5%	51.5%	9%	13%
4–7 Jun	NOP/Daily Mail	42.8%	49.5%	7.4%	6.7%
27 May – 2 Jun	Gallup/Daily Telegraph	42%	47%	10.5%	5%
21–26 May	Gallup/Daily Telegraph	39.5%	51.5%	8.5%	12%
21–24 May	NOP/Daily Mail	42.2%	49.5%	7.9%	7.3%
13–19 May	Gallup/Daily Telegraph	41%	48%	11%	7%
9–12 May	Gallup/Daily Telegraph	38%	51%	10.5%	13%
1–5 May	Gallup/Daily Telegraph	35.5%	55%	9.5%	19.5%
29 Apr – 3 May	NOP/Daily Mail	40.9%	49.9%	8.7%	9%
24–28 Apr	Gallup/Daily Telegraph	36.5%	52%	10.5%	15.5%
15–21 Apr	Gallup/Daily Telegraph	39%	51.5%	9%	12.5%
15–19 Apr	NOP/Daily Mail	38.7%	52.4%	8.7%	13.7%
9–14 Apr	Gallup/Daily Telegraph	41%	49%	9.5%	8%
2–7 Apr	Gallup/Daily Telegraph	37.5%	49.5%	13%	12%
2–5 Apr	NOP/Daily Mail	40.7%	50.9%	8.2%	10.2%
25–31 Mar	Gallup/Daily Telegraph	38.5%	49.5%	11.5%	11%
19–24 Mar	Gallup/Daily Telegraph	40%	49%	10.5%	9%
19–22 Mar	NOP/Daily Mail	42%	49.9%	7.2%	7.9%
12–17 Mar	Gallup/Daily Telegraph	38.5%	46.5%	14%	8%
5–10 Mar	Gallup/Daily Telegraph	37%	50%	13%	13%
6–9 Mar	NOP/Daily Mail	41.5%	48.7%	9.2%	7.2%
27 Feb – 3 Mar	Gallup/Daily Telegraph	39.5%	47.5%	12%	8%
20–25 Feb	Gallup/Daily Telegraph	42%	45%	11.5%	3%
13–18 Feb	Gallup/Daily Telegraph	40%	48%	11.5%	8%
8–16 Feb	NOP/Daily Mail	40.7%	49.6%	9.6%	8.9%
6–11 Feb	Gallup/Daily Telegraph	39%	48.5%	12%	9.5%
30 Jan – 4 Feb	Gallup/Daily Telegraph	38%	50%	11%	12%
23–28 Jan	Gallup/Daily Telegraph	38%	48%	13%	10%
16–21 Jan	Gallup/Daily Telegraph	40.5%	46.5%	12.5%	6%
9–14 Jan	Gallup/Daily Telegraph	39.5%	48%	12.5%	8.5%
9–12 Jan	NOP/Daily Mail	41.6%	48.4%	9.7%	6.8%
28 Dec – 7 Jan	Gallup/Daily Telegraph	39%	50%	10.5%	11%

=== 1963 ===
Fieldwork	Polling Organisation	Con	Lab	Lib	Lead
12–16 Dec	Gallup/Daily Telegraph	37%	50%	12%	13%
13–15 Dec	NOP/Daily Mail	40.9%	49.6%	9.2%	8.7%
3–9 Dec	Gallup/Daily Telegraph	39%	47%	13.5%	8%
29 Nov – 3 Dec	Gallup/Daily Telegraph	39%	48%	12.5%	9%
21–26 Nov	Gallup/Daily Telegraph	38%	49.5%	12%	11.5%
15–17 Nov	NOP/Daily Mail	40.5%	48.2%	10.7%	7.7%
31 Oct – 5 Nov	Gallup/Daily Telegraph	37%	49%	13%	12%
24–28 Oct	Gallup/Daily Telegraph	36%	50%	13%	14%
17–22 Oct	Gallup/Daily Telegraph	38%	49%	12%	11%
18–20 Oct	NOP/Daily Mail	41%	48.5%	10.2%	7.5%
18–19 Oct	Prime Minister Harold Macmillan resigns and is replaced by Alec Douglas-Home				
3–8 Oct	Gallup/Daily Telegraph	35%	47.5%	16%	12.5%
26 Sep – 1 Oct	Gallup/Daily Telegraph	35.5%	46.5%	17%	11%
21–22 Sep	NOP/Daily Mail	39.4%	46.5%	13.7%	7.1%
5–10 Sep	Gallup/Daily Telegraph	33%	50%	15%	16%
29 Aug – 3 Sep	Gallup/Daily Telegraph	33.5%	50.5%	15%	17%
22–27 Aug	Gallup/Daily Telegraph	33.5%	49.5%	15.5%	16%
24–25 Aug	NOP/Daily Mail	38.6%	47.8%	13.4%	9.2%
1–6 Aug	Gallup/Daily Telegraph	35%	49.5%	14.5%	14.5%
25–30 Jul	Gallup/Daily Telegraph	33%	50.5%	15.5%	17.5%
29 Jul	NOP/Daily Mail	41%	47.9%	10.9%	6.9%
18–23 Jul	Gallup/Daily Telegraph	32%	52%	15%	20%
20–22 Jul	NOP/Daily Mail	39.3%	47.6%	12.7%	8.3%
5–10 Jul	Gallup/Daily Telegraph	34%	52%	13%	18%
28 Jun – 2 Jul	Gallup/Daily Telegraph	34.5%	51.5%	13%	17%
22–26 Jun	Gallup/Daily Telegraph	36%	50%	13%	14%
14 Jun	NOP/Daily Mail	34.6%	51.3%	13.9%	16.7%
7–14 Jun	Gallup/Daily Telegraph	31%	51.5%	16.5%	20.5%
4 Jun	NOP/Daily Mail	33.5%	52.2%	14.1%	18.7%
10–17 May	Gallup/Daily Telegraph	36%	47%	16%	11%
29 Mar – 10 Apr	Gallup/Daily Telegraph	34%	49.5%	16%	15.5%
9 Apr	NOP/Daily Mail	36.1%	48.7%	14.7%	12.6%
1–12 Mar	Gallup/Daily Telegraph	33.5%	50%	15.5%	16.5%
14 Feb	Harold Wilson elected Labour Party leader				
1–5 Feb	Gallup/Daily Telegraph	32.5%	48%	18.5%	15.5%
11–18 Jan	Gallup/Daily Telegraph	35%	48%	16.5%	13%

=== 1962 ===
Fieldwork	Polling Organisation	Con	Lab	Lib	Lead
4–21 Dec	Gallup/Daily Telegraph	37%	46%	17%	9%
16–24 Nov	Gallup/Daily Telegraph	34.5%	44.5%	20.5%	10%
9–16 Nov	Gallup/Daily Telegraph	36%	42.5%	20%	6.5%
2–9 Nov	Gallup/Daily Telegraph	39%	47%	13%	8%
12–20 Oct	Gallup/Daily Telegraph	40%	41.5%	17%	1.5%
15–13 Oct	Gallup/Daily Telegraph	34.5%	43.5%	20%	9%
20–26 Sep	Gallup/Daily Telegraph	36.5%	45%	17.5%	8.5%
12–19 Sep	Gallup/Daily Telegraph	34%	45%	20%	11%
2–10 Aug	Gallup/Daily Telegraph	34%	43%	22%	9%
20–25 Jul	Gallup/Daily Telegraph	36%	40.5%	22.5%	4.5%
13 Jul	The Night of the Long Knives				
6–11 Jul	Gallup/Daily Telegraph	37.5%	39.5%	22%	2%
29 Jun – 4 Jul	Gallup/Daily Telegraph	35.5%	41.5%	22%	6%
1–6 Jun	Gallup/Daily Telegraph	35.5%	39%	24%	3.5%
3–19 May	Gallup/Daily Telegraph	34.5%	39.5%	24.5%	5%
7–16 Apr	Gallup/Daily Telegraph	33%	41%	25%	8%
14–21 Mar	Gallup/Daily Telegraph	33%	40%	26%	7%
1–7 Mar	Gallup/Daily Telegraph	39.5%	44%	16%	4.5%
2–9 Feb	Gallup/Daily Telegraph	40%	42.5%	17%	2.5%
5–14 Jan	Gallup/Daily Telegraph	42%	42%	15%	Tie

=== 1961 ===
Fieldwork	Polling Organisation	Con	Lab	Lib	Lead
30 Nov – 6 Dec	Gallup/Daily Telegraph	38.5%	43%	17.5%	4.5%
9–16 Nov	Gallup/Daily Telegraph	39%	40%	20%	1%
2–7 Nov	Gallup/Daily Telegraph	41.5%	43%	14.5%	1.5%
2 Nov	Hugh Gaitskell re-elected Labour Party leader				
12–16 Sep	Gallup/Daily Telegraph	43.5%	43.5%	12%	Tie
24 Aug–2 Sep	Gallup/Daily Telegraph	42.5%	45%	12%	2.5%
30 Aug – 4 Sep	Gallup/Daily Telegraph	40%	45.5%	13.5%	5.5%
2–9 Aug	Gallup/Daily Telegraph	38%	43%	17%	6%
29 Jun – 5 Jul	Gallup/Daily Telegraph	44%	41.5%	14%	2.5%
30 May – 7 Jun	Gallup/Daily Telegraph	43.5%	40%	15%	3.5%
28 Apr – 9 May	Gallup/Daily Telegraph	44.5%	40.5%	14%	4%
21–26 Apr	Gallup/Daily Telegraph	43.5%	40.5%	15%	3%
Mar	Gallup/Daily Telegraph	44%	40%	15%	4%
Feb	Gallup/Daily Telegraph	44%	42%	13%	2%
Jan	Gallup/Daily Telegraph	45%	41.5%	12.5%	3.5%

=== 1960 ===
Fieldwork	Polling Organisation	Con	Lab	Lib	Lead
Dec	Gallup	47.5%	37.5%	14%	10%
3–29 Nov	Gallup	46%	40.5%	13.5%	5.5%
3 Nov	Hugh Gaitskell re-elected Labour Party leader				
20 Oct – 2 Nov	Gallup	50%	37%	12.5%	13%
8–4 Sep	Gallup	47.5%	40.5%	11%	7%
25 Aug – 5 Sep	Gallup	47.5%	42%	10%	5.5%
1–27 Jul	Gallup	47%	43%	9%	4%
3–29 Jun	Gallup	45.5%	43%	10.5%	2.5%
1–29 May	Gallup	45.5%	42.5%	11%	3%
6–27 Apr	Gallup	45%	42.5%	11.5%	2.5%
11–25 Mar	Gallup	47%	42%	10%	5%
5–24 Feb	Gallup	47%	43.5%	9%	3.5%
19–20 Jan	Gallup	47%	42.5%	9.5%	4.5%
1–6 Jan	Gallup	47%	43.5%	8.5%	3.5%

=== 1959 ===
Fieldwork	Polling Organisation	Con	Lab	Lib	Lead
Dec	Gallup/News Chronicle	47.5%	44%	7.5%	3.5%
Nov	Gallup/News Chronicle	48%	44%	7%	4%
Oct	Gallup/News Chronicle	48%	46%	5%	2%
8 Oct	General Election Results	49.4%	43.8%	5.9%	5.6%
