= 1964 United Kingdom general election in Scotland =

- 15 October 1964

All 71 Scottish seats to the House of Commons
- Turnout: 77.6% (▼0.5 pp)
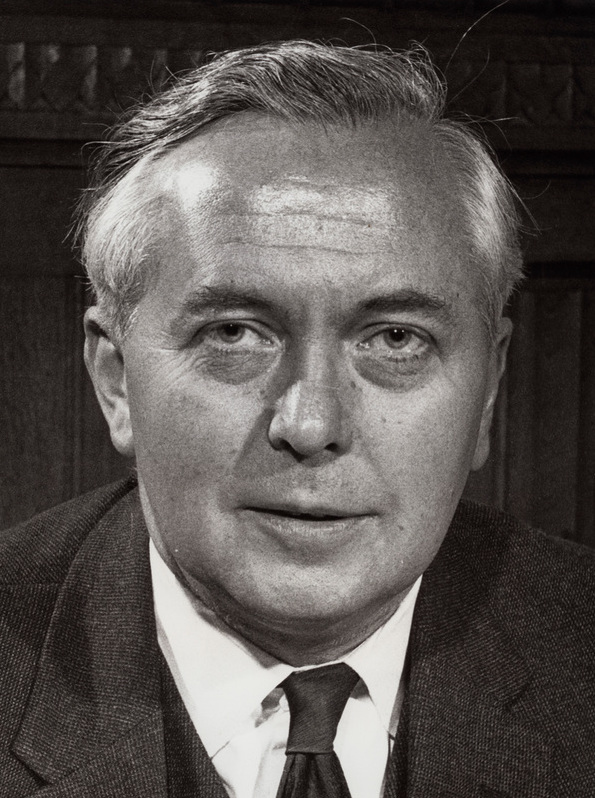

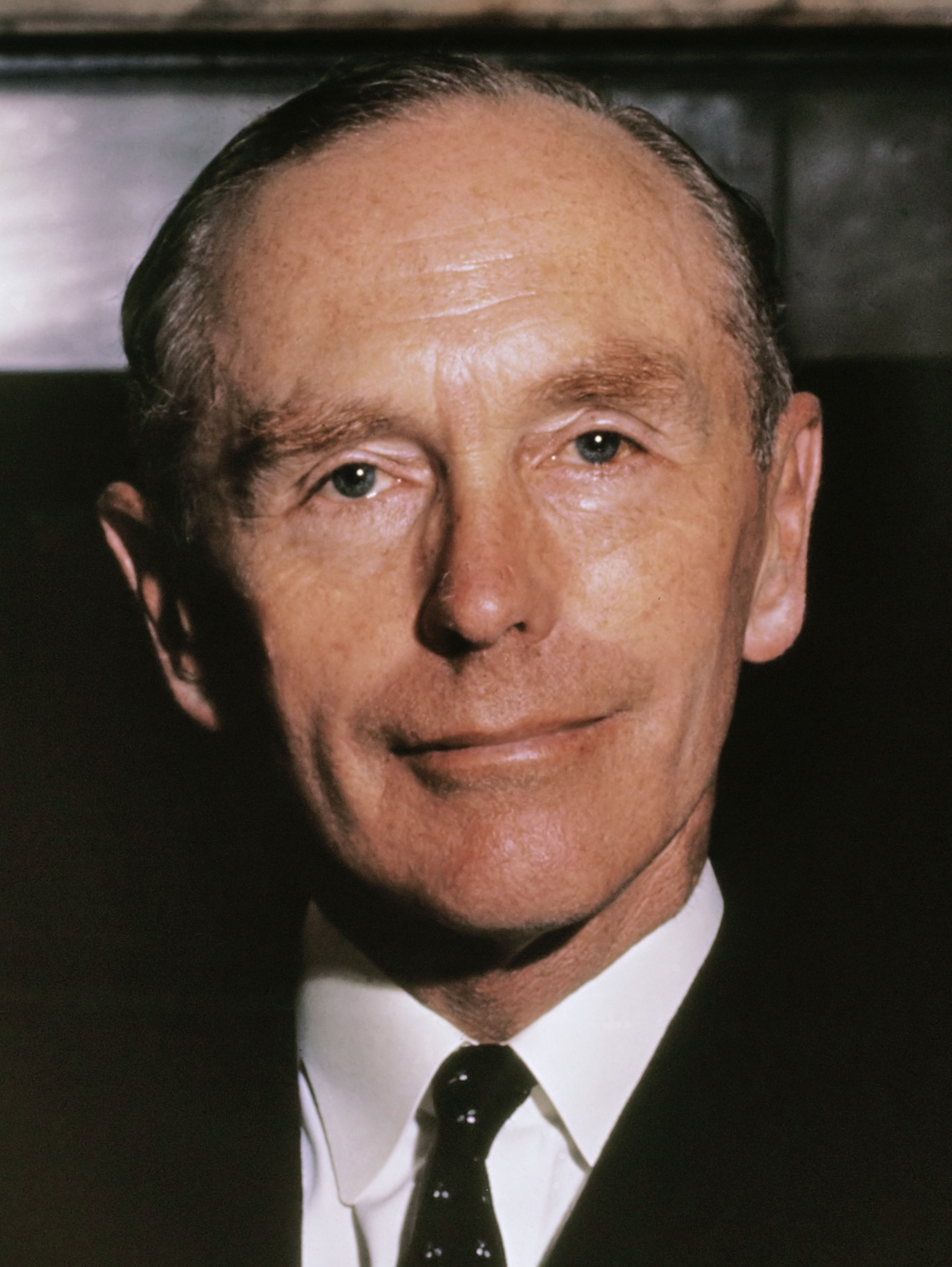

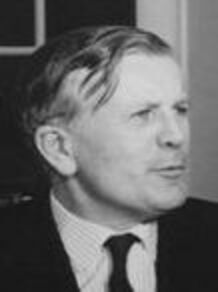
	First party	Second party	Third party
Leader	Harold Wilson	Alec Douglas-Home	Jo Grimond
Party	Labour	Unionist	Liberal
Alliance		Conservative	Liberal
Leader since	14 February 1963	18 October 1963	5 November 1956
Leader's seat	Huyton	Kinross and Western Perthshire	Orkney and Shetland
Last election	38 seats, 46.7%	31 seats, 47.3%	1 seat, 4.1%
Seats won	43	24 (Note: The seat and vote count figures for the Unionists given here include the National Liberals)	4
Seat change	▲5	▼7	▲3
Popular vote	1,283,667	1,069,695	200,063
Percentage	48.7%	40.6%	7.6%
Swing	▲2.0 pp	▼6.7 pp	▲3.5 pp

On 15 October 1964, the 1964 United Kingdom general election was held in Scotland, to elect all 630 seats of the House of Commons, with 71 constituencies being in Scotland.

The election was the last election fought by the Unionists as a separate party. From April 1965 the party was renamed as the Scottish Conservative and Unionist Party, and became the Scottish branch of the UK Conservative Party.

It was also the last election in which the National Liberal Party would contest any seat in Scotland. The party would also be merged into the Conservative Party in 1968, with it only fielding candidates in England in the 1966 United Kingdom general election.

== Candidates ==
Below is a table summarising the candidates of the 1964 general election in Scotland.

Affiliation	Candidates
Labour Party	71
Unionist Party	65
Liberal Party	26
Scottish National Party	15
Communist Party of Great Britain	9
National Liberal Party	6
Independent Unionist	1 (Note: Candidate John Young stood in Caithness and Sutherland.)
Anti-Vivisection	1 (Note: Candidate Gabriel Barlow stood in Glasgow Maryhill.)
Independent Labour	1 (Note: Candidate John Stevenson Thomson stood in Greenock.)
League of Empire Loyalists	1 (Note: Candidate Leslie Greene stood in East Fife.)
Socialist Party of Great Britain	1 (Note: Candidate Robert Vallar stood in Glasgow Woodside.)
Total	197

== Analysis ==
=== Labour and Unionists ===
The election saw Labour pick up seats from the Unionists and National Liberal Party, both of which were under a national affiliation with the Conservative Party. Combined with results from across the UK, the election resulted in the Conservative and Unionist Party, led by incumbent Prime Minister Alec Douglas-Home, narrowly losing to the Labour Party, led by Harold Wilson; Labour secured a parliamentary majority of four seats and ended a thirteen-year period in opposition. Wilson became the youngest Prime Minister since Lord Rosebery in 1894.

In Scotland, Labour won Glasgow Kelvingrove, Glasgow Pollok, Glasgow Woodside and Rutherglen from the Unionist Party, as well as one seat from the National Liberal Party. In Glasgow Woodside, the Labour Party won the 1962 Glasgow Woodside by-election following the resignation of Unionist MP William Grant upon his appointment as the Lord Justice Clerk. The retention of Labour candidate Neil Carmichael was a gain from the Unionists. Similarly, in Rutherglen, following the death of Unionist MP Richard Brooman-White, Labour won the seat in the highly contested 1964 Rutherglen by-election. Gregor Mackenzie, Labour's candidate, retained the seat, representing a gain from the Unionists when compared to the previous election.

Overall, Labour won five seats in Scotland at this election. The Unionists lost four seats to Labour and another from the Liberal Party, however gained four seats from its constituency ally, the National Liberal Party. Thus, the Unionists only lost one seat overall in Scotland.

=== National Liberals ===
The National Liberal Party lost all six of its seats, with most being won instead internally within the constituency alliance to the Unionist Party. In Dumfriesshire, sitting Member of Parliament, Niall Macpherson, was elevated to a peerage which caused the 1963 Dumfriesshire by-election. The Unionist candidate David Anderson won the seat, but did not re-contest the seat in this election. However, Unionist candidate Hector Monro won the seat for the Unionists at this election, representing a gain from the National Liberals in favour of the Unionists. Similarly, in East Fife, sitting MP and former Chairman of the National Liberal Party James Henderson-Stewart died. This caused the 1961 East Fife by-election wherein Unionist Sir John Gilmour won the seat. His retention at this election was also a gain from the National Liberals in favour of the Unionists. Another former Chairman, Sir James Duncan, did not re-contest the seat of South Angus. Instead, Unionist candidate Jock Bruce-Gardyne won the seat. North Angus and Mearns was also won by the Unionists, with sitting National Liberal, Colin Thornton-Kemsley retiring from Parliament.

Outside the constituency alliance, yet another former Chairman John Maclay did not re-contest West Renfrewshire, with Labour winning against a Unionist candidate. Finally, John MacLeod did re-contest his seat of Ross and Cromarty, however lost it to Liberal candidate Alasdair Mackenzie. All five other candidates that stood for the National Liberals were unsuccessful.

=== Liberal Party ===
Aside the win in Ross and Cromarty from the National Liberal Party, the Scottish Liberal Party won Inverness from the Unionist Party, as well as Caithness and Sutherland. The gain in Caithness and Sutherland was from an Independent Unionist held seat, however sitting MP David Robertson did not re-contest the seat, with the Liberals winning it with Labour close behind.

Leader of the Liberal Party Jo Grimond retained his seat of Orkney and Shetland and maintained his healthy majority in the seat. The Liberals therefore increased their seat count by three in Scotland.

== Results ==
Party	Seats					Aggregate votes		
Party	Total	Gains	Losses	Net	Of total (%)	Total	Of total (%)	Change (%)
Labour Party	43	5	0	▲5	60.6	1,283,667	48.7	▲2.0
Unionist (Total)	24	4	11	▼7	33.8	1,069,695	40.6	▼6.7
Unionist	24	4	5	▼1	33.8	981,641	37.3	▼2.5
National Liberal	0	0	6	▼6	—	88,054	3.3	▼4.2
Liberal	4	3	0	▲3	5.6	200,063	7.6	▲3.5
SNP	0	0	0	Steady	—	64,044	2.4	▲1.6
Communist	0	0	0	Steady	—	12,241	0.5	Steady
Ind. Unionist	0	0	1 (Note: Sir David Robertson, who sat as an Independent Unionist, retired from his seat of Caithness and Sutherland. The seat was gained by the Liberal Party)	▼1	—	2,795	0.1	▼0.4
Anti-Vivisection	0	New			—	1,231	0.1	New
Independent Labour	0	Did not stand in 1959			—	458	0.0	—N/a
Empire Loyalists	0	New			—	257	0.0	New
Socialist (GB)	0	New			—	88	0.0	New
Blank and invalid votes						4,702	—	—
Total	71			0	100.0	2,634,539 (Note: All valid votes excluding spoiled votes.)	100.0	0.0
Registered voters, and turnout						3,393,421	77.6	▼0.5

Popular vote
Labour	48.72%
Unionist	40.60%
Liberal	7.59%
SNP	2.43%
Other	0.64%

Parliamentary seats
Labour	60.56%
Unionist	33.80%
Liberal	5.63%

== See also ==
- 1964 United Kingdom general election in England
- 1964 United Kingdom general election in Wales
- 1964 United Kingdom general election in Northern Ireland
- List of MPs for constituencies in Scotland (1964–1966)
