= Michael Fogarty =

Michael Fogarty may refer to:

- Michael Fogarty (bishop), Irish former Roman Catholic prelate and Bishop of Killaloe
- Michael Fogarty (politician), British former Liberal Party politician and academic
