= 1964 United Kingdom general election in Wales =

- 15 October 1964

All 36 Welsh seats to the House of Commons
- Turnout: 80.1% (▼2.5 pp)
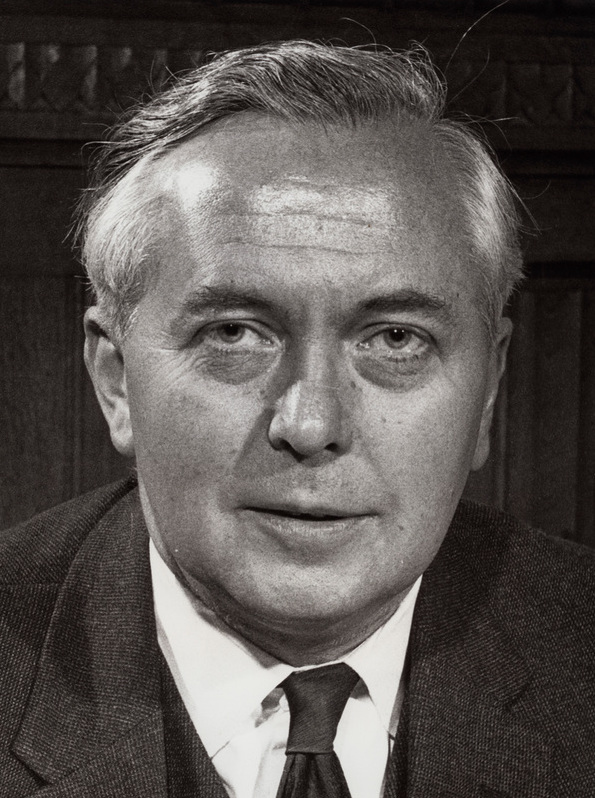

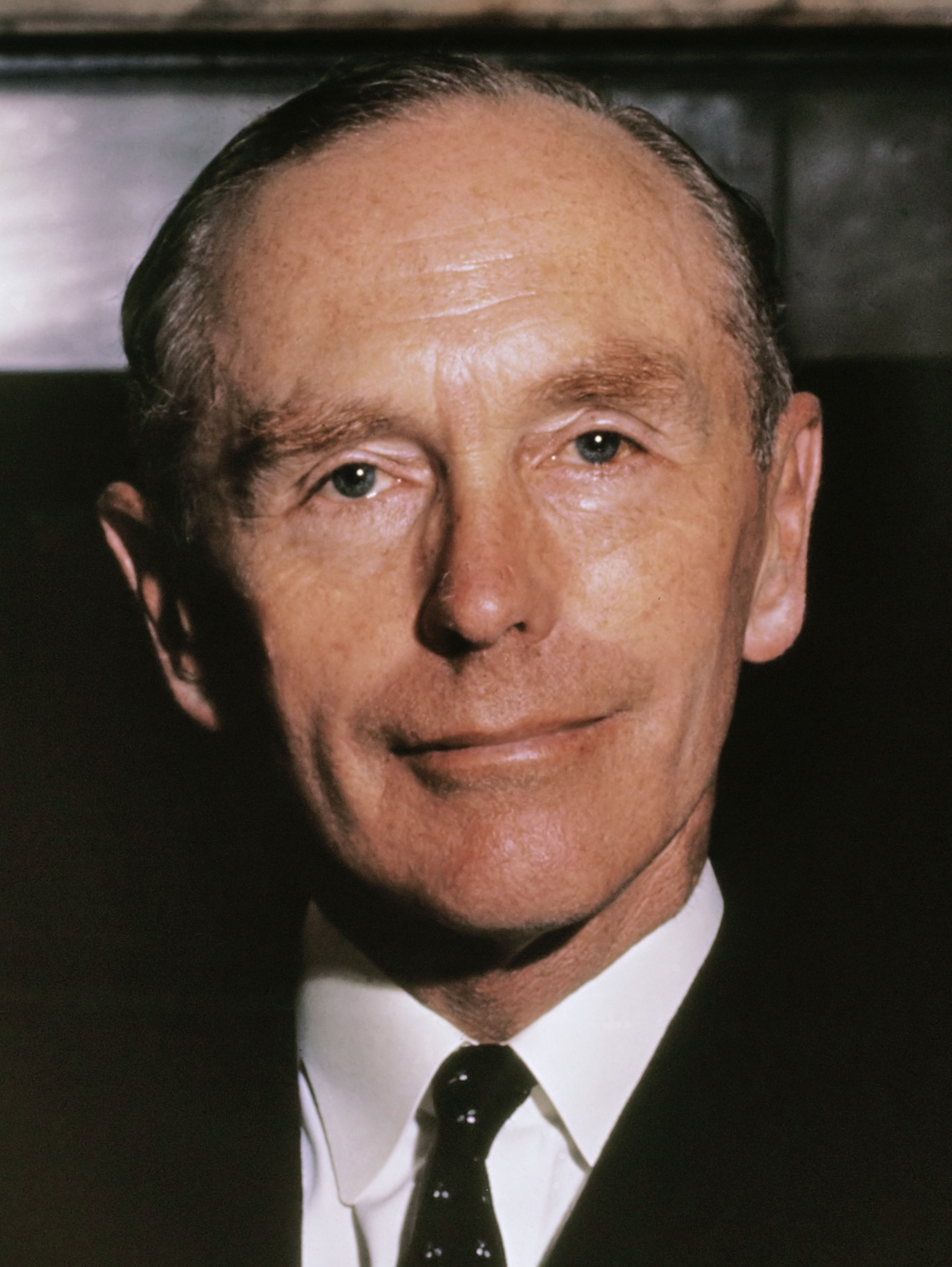

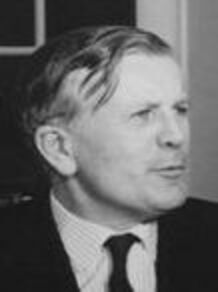
	First party	Second party	Third party
Leader	Harold Wilson	Alec Douglas-Home	Jo Grimond
Party	Labour	Conservative	Liberal
Leader since	14 February 1963	18 October 1963	5 November 1956
Leader's seat	Huyton	Kinross and Western Perthshire	Orkney and Shetland
Last election	27 seats, 56.4%	7 seats, 32.6%	2 seats, 5.3%
Seats won	28	6	2
Seat change	▲1	▼1	Steady
Popular vote	837,022	425,022	106,114
Percentage	57.8%	29.4%	7.3%
Swing	▲1.4 pp	▼3.2 pp	▲2.0 pp

On Thursday 15 October 1964, the 1964 United Kingdom general election was held in Wales, to elect all 630 members of the House of Commons, with 36 constituencies being in Wales.

The election saw the Labour party win the most votes and seats in Wales, increasing its seats in Wales from 27 to 28, picking up one seat from the Conservative Party.

The Conservative Party gained Denbigh from its constituency alliance party, the National Liberal Party. Geraint Morgan, who was the sitting National Liberal MP instead stood as a Conservative candidate, retaining the seat for the constituency alliance between the parties overall. This was the last election at which the National Liberals stood any candidates in Wales, before the party officially merged with the Conservatives in 1968, with it only fielding candidates in England in the 1966 United Kingdom general election.

The Conservative Party lost Swansea West to Labour.

The Liberal Party retained its two seats in Wales. These were Cardiganshire and Montgomeryshire. Emlyn Hooson retained Montgomeryshire following the 1962 Montgomeryshire by-election after the death of the former Leader of the Liberal Party Clement Davies.

== Candidates ==
Below is a table summarising the candidates of the 1964 general election in Wales.

Affiliation	Candidates
Labour Party	36
Conservative and Unionist Party	34
Plaid Cymru	23
Liberal Party	12
Communist Party of Great Britain	5
National Liberal Party	2
Total	112

== Results ==
Below is a table summarising the results of the 1964 general election in Wales.

Party	Seats					Aggregate votes		
Party	Total	Gains	Losses	Net	Of total (%)	Total	Of total (%)	Change (%)
Labour	28	1	0	▲1	77.8	837,022	57.8	▲1.4
Conservative (Total)	6	1	2	▼1	16.7	425,022	29.4	▼3.2
Conservative	6	1	1	Steady	16.7	398,960	27.6	▼2.0
National Liberal	0	0	1	▼1	—	26,062	1.8	▼1.2
Liberal	2	0	0	Steady	5.6	106,114	7.3	▲2.0
Plaid Cymru	0	0	0	Steady	—	69,507	4.8	▼0.4
Communist	0	0	0	Steady	—	9,377	0.6	▲0.1
Blank and invalid votes						2,567	—	—
Total	36			0	100.0	1,447,042 (Note: All valid votes excluding spoiled votes.)	100.0	0.0
Registered voters, and turnout						1,805,454	80.1	▼2.5

Popular vote
Labour	57.8%
Conservative	29.4%
Liberal	7.3%
Plaid Cymru	4.8%
Communist	0.6%

Parliament seats
Labour	77.8%
Conservative	16.7%
Liberal	5.6%

== See also ==
- 1964 United Kingdom general election in England
- 1964 United Kingdom general election in Scotland
- 1964 United Kingdom general election in Northern Ireland
- List of MPs for constituencies in Wales (1964–1966)
