= 1964 United Kingdom general election in England =

- 15 October 1964

All 511 English seats in the House of Commons
- Turnout: 77.0% (▼1.9 pp)
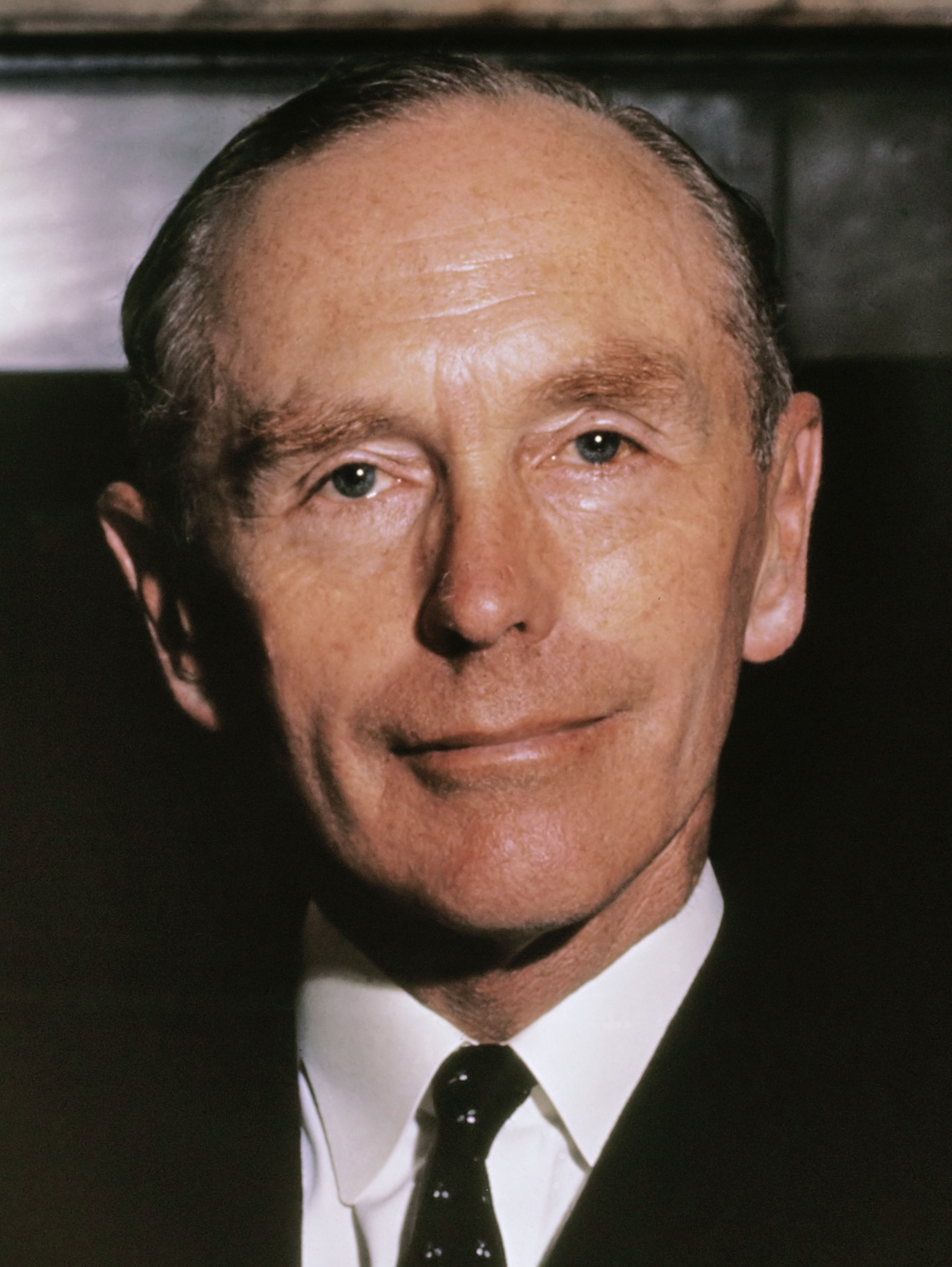

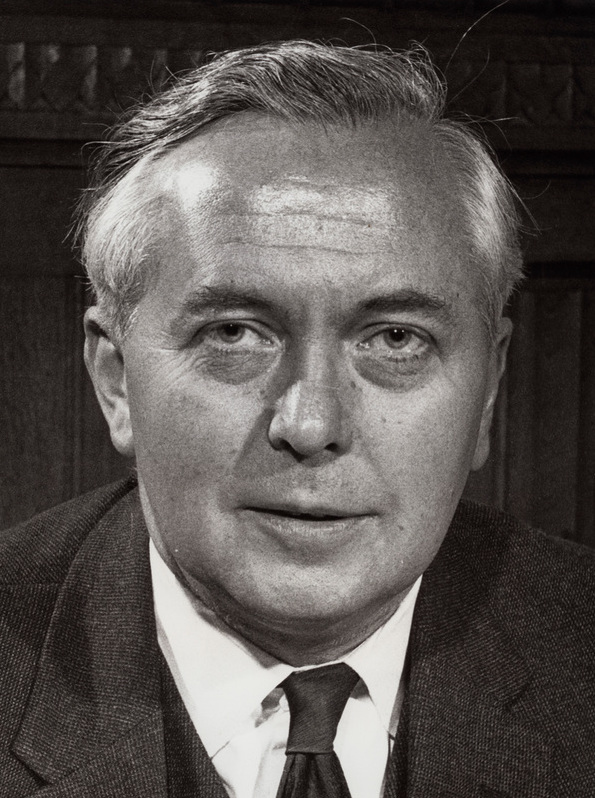

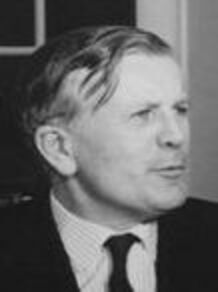
	First party	Second party	Third party
Leader	Alec Douglas-Home	Harold Wilson	Jo Grimond
Party	Conservative	Labour	Liberal
Leader since	18 October 1963	14 February 1963	5 November 1956
Leader's seat	Kinross and Western Perthshire	Huyton	Orkney and Shetland
Last election	315 seats, 50.0%	193 seats, 43.6%	3 seats, 6.3%
Seats won	262 (Note: Figure includes Speaker of the House of Commons Sir Harry Hylton-Foster in Cities of London and Westminster, elected as such just after the general election.)	246	3
Seat change	▼53	▲53	Steady
Popular vote	10,106,028	9,982,360	2,775,752
Percentage	44.1%	43.5%	12.1%
Swing	▼5.9 pp	▼0.1 pp	▲5.8 pp

On Thursday 15 October 1964, the 1964 United Kingdom general election was held in England, to elect all 630 members of the House of Commons, with 511 constituencies being in England.

== Candidates ==
Below is a table summarising the candidates of the 1964 general election in England.

Affiliation	Candidates
Labour Party	511
Conservative and Unionist Party	500
Liberal Party	323
Communist Party of Great Britain	22
Independent	13
National Liberal Party	11
Independent Conservative	4 (Note: The candidates that stood were Donald Johnson in Carlisle, Warwick Arthur Claremont Mowbray in Enfield West and Robert C. Middelwood in Sunderland North.)
Independent Liberal	3 (Note: The candidates that stood were Alice M. Pearce in Bristol North East, David G. Russell in Clapham, James Rafton Smallwood in Morecambe and Lonsdale and Charles Ford in Wokingham.)
Anti-Common Market League	2 (Note: The candidates that stood were William Brown in Brierley Hill and John Paul in Bexley.)
League of Empire Loyalists	2 (Note: The candidates that stood were Rosine de Bounevialle in Petersfield and William Brooks in Streatham.)
Independent Nuclear Disarmament	2 (Note: The candidates that stood were A. James W. Haigh in Bromley and Michael H. Craft in Twickenham.)
Patriotic Party	2 (Note: The candidates that stood were Barbara Davies in Dorking and Arthur Rossi Braybrooke in Fulham.)
Other	14 (Note: Each were individual candidates or minor parties)
Total	1,409

== Analysis ==
=== Conservatives and Labour ===
In this election, although the incumbent Conservative government led by Prime Minister Alec Douglas-Home was defeated by the Labour Party led by Harold Wilson, the Conservatives along with the National Liberal Party narrowly won a majority of seats in England. In the post-war era, this remains one of the two elections (the other being the 1950 general election) where the party winning a majority in the House of Commons did not win a plurality of seats in England; rather, the party which lost the general election won a majority of seats in England.

The Conservative Party lost a total of 55 seats to the Labour Party, however gained Birmingham Perry Barr, Eton and Slough, South West Norfolk and Smethwick from Labour. Conversely, the Labour Party won 55 seats from the Conservative Party and two from the Liberals, though losing a four to the Conservatives. Overall, the Labour Party gained 53 seats at this election.

=== National Liberal Party ===
The National Liberal Party, which was in a constituency alliance with the Conservative Party, held Bradford West, Bristol North East, Harwich, Holland with Boston, Huntingdonshire and St Ives.

The National Liberals, however, lost more than half of its seats in England. The majority of its losses came from sitting MPs standing as official candidates for the Conservative party rather than the National Liberals. Such members were Joan Vickers in Plymouth Devonport, Norman Cole in Bedfordshire South, John Osborn in Sheffield Hallam and Sir Peter Roberts in Sheffield Heeley. This also occurred in Norfolk Central. Ian Gilmour had won the seat at the 1962 Central Norfolk by-election following the death of Richard Collard, however stood as a Conservative candidate, winning the seat again at this election.

The National Liberals further lost Bradford North to the Labour Party. It also Luton to the Labour Party. In Luton, William Howie had retained the seat he had won at the 1963 Luton by-election. As such, the National Liberal Party lost seven seats in England. Along with the losses of the Conservative Party to Labour and the Liberal Party, and seats transferred between the National Liberals and Conservatives, the alliance lost an overall 53 seats in England.

=== Liberal Party ===
The Liberal Party lost Bolton West and Huddersfield West (initially held by the Deputy Leader of the Liberal Party Donald Wade) in the North to the Labour Party, however gained Bodmin and Orpington from the Conservatives. The party's seat count did not change overall, although the party stood significantly more candidates than it had in previous elections, significantly increasing its vote share.

== Results ==
Party	Seats					Aggregate votes		
Party	Total	Gains	Losses	Net	Of all (%)	Total	Of all (%)	Change (%)
Conservative (Total)	262	9	62	▼53	51.3	10,106,028	44.1	▼5.9
Conservative	256	9	55	▼46	50.1	9,894,014	43.1	▼4.6
National Liberal	6	0	7	▼7	1.2	212,014	0.9	▼1.4
Labour	246	57	4	▲53	48.1	9,982,360	43.5	▼0.1
Liberal	3	2	2	Steady	0.6	2,775,752	12.1	▲5.8
Communist	0	0	0	Steady	—	24,824	0.1	Steady
Independent Liberal	0	0	0	Steady	—	14,011	0.1	▲0.1
Independent	0	0	0	Steady	—	12,495	0.1	▲0.1
Ind. Conservative	0	0	0	Steady	—	3,664	0.0	Steady
British National	0	New			—	3,410	0.0	New
Anti-Common Market	0	New			—	3,083	0.0	New
New Liberal	0	New			—	2,053	0.0	New
Independent Nuclear Disarmament	0	New			—	1,534	0.0	New
Fellowship	0	0	0	Steady	—	1,112	0.0	Steady
Communist Anti-Revisionist	0	New			—	899	0.0	New
Christian Progressive	0	New			—	865	0.0	New
Ratepayer (Romford)	0	New			—	811	0.0	New
Empire Loyalists	0	New			—	789	0.0	New
Taxpayers' Coalition	0	New			—	709	0.0	New
Patriotic Party	0	New			—	539	0.0	New
Farmers' Candidate	0	New			—	534	0.0	New
National Democratic	0	New			—	349	0.0	New
World Government	0	New			—	318	0.0	New
British and Commonwealth	0	New			—	310	0.0	New
Social Credit	0	New			—	304	0.0	New
Christian Socialist	0	New			—	264	0.0	New
Socialist (GB)	0	0	0	Steady	—	234	0.0	Steady
Blank and invalid votes						31,484	—	—
Total	511			0	100.0	22,937,251 (Note: All valid votes excluding spoiled votes.)	100.0	0.0
Registered voters, and turnout						29,804,627	77.0	▼1.9

Popular vote
Conservative	44.1%
Labour	43.5%
Liberal	12.1%
Other	0.3%

Parliament seats
Conservative	51.27%
Labour	48.14%
Liberal	0.58%

== By region ==
Note: the following tables indicate the results according to the regions of England which were established in 1994, based on the county boundaries established in the 1974 local government reforms. These regions were not used at the time for the purposes of this election.

=== East Midlands ===
Party	Seats					Aggregate votes		
Party	Total	Gains	Losses	Net	Of all (%)	Total	Of all (%)	Change (%)
Labour	24	4	0	▲4	63.2	—N/a	48.2	▼0.7
Conservative	14	0	4	▼4	36.8	—N/a	42.2	▼4.7
Liberal	0	0	0	Steady	0.0	—N/a	9.5	▲5.3
Others	0	0	0	Steady	0.0	—N/a	0.1	Steady
Total	38					—N/a		

=== East of England ===
Party	Seats					Aggregate votes		
Party	Total	Gains	Losses	Net	Of all (%)	Total	Of all (%)	Change (%)
Conservative	31	1	6	▼5	75.6	—N/a	46.4	▼4.8
Labour	10	6	1	▲5	24.4	—N/a	40.8	▲0.6
Liberal	0	0	0	Steady	0.0	—N/a	12.7	▲4.3
Others	0	0	0	Steady	0.0	—N/a	0.1	▼0.1
Total	41					—N/a		

=== Greater London ===
Party	Seats					Aggregate votes		
Party	Total	Gains	Losses	Net	Of all (%)	Total	Of all (%)	Change (%)
Labour	53	11	0	▲11	51.9	—N/a	44.4	▲1.1
Conservative	48 (Note: Figure includes the Speaker of the House of Commons.)	0	12	▼12	47.1	—N/a	42.4	▼7.0
Liberal	1	1	0	▲1	1.0	—N/a	12.5	▲5.6
Others	0	0	0	Steady	0.0	—N/a	0.7	▲0.3
Total	102					—N/a		

=== North East England ===
Party	Seats					Aggregate votes		
Party	Total	Gains	Losses	Net	Of all (%)	Total	Of all (%)	Change (%)
Labour	27	6	0	▲6	87.1	—N/a	58.5	▲1.8
Conservative	4	0	6	▼6	12.9	—N/a	37.5	▼4.4
Liberal	0	0	0	Steady	0.0	—N/a	3.9	▲2.4
Others	0	0	0	Steady	0.0	—N/a	0.1	▲0.1
Total	31					—N/a		

=== North West England ===
Party	Seats					Aggregate votes		
Party	Total	Gains	Losses	Net	Of all (%)	Total	Of all (%)	Change (%)
Labour	52	14	0	▲14	62.7	—N/a	45.9	▲1.0
Conservative	31	0	13	▼13	37.3	—N/a	43.1	▼7.2
Liberal	0	0	1	▼1	0.0	—N/a	10.6	▲6.0
Others	0	0	0	Steady	0.0	—N/a	0.4	▲0.3
Total	83					—N/a		

=== South East England ===
Party	Seats					Aggregate votes		
Party	Total	Gains	Losses	Net	Of all (%)	Total	Of all (%)	Change (%)
Conservative	53	1	5	▼4	86.9	—N/a	50.4	▼8.4
Labour	8	5	1	▲4	13.1	—N/a	32.7	▼0.9
Liberal	0	0	0	Steady	0.0	—N/a	16.8	▲9.2
Others	0	0	0	Steady	0.0	—N/a	0.0	▲0.1
Total	61					—N/a		

=== South West England ===
Party	Seats					Aggregate votes		
Party	Total	Gains	Losses	Net	Of all (%)	Total	Of all (%)	Change (%)
Conservative	36	0	1	▼1	80.0	—N/a	45.4	▼5.5
Labour	7	5	0	Steady	15.6	—N/a	33.6	▼0.6
Liberal	2	1	0	▲1	4.4	—N/a	20.5	▲5.8
Others	0	0	0	Steady	0.0	—N/a	0.5	▲0.4
Total	45					—N/a		

=== West Midlands ===
Party	Seats					Aggregate votes		
Party	Total	Gains	Losses	Net	Of all (%)	Total	Of all (%)	Change (%)
Labour	28	5	2	▲3	51.9	—N/a	45.2	▼0.7
Conservative	26	2	5	▼3	48.1	—N/a	46.8	▼3.9
Liberal	0	0	0	Steady	0.0	—N/a	7.8	▲4.6
Others	0	0	0	Steady	0.0	—N/a	0.3	▲0.1
Total	54					—N/a		

=== Yorkshire and the Humber ===
Party	Seats					Aggregate votes		
Party	Total	Gains	Losses	Net	Of all (%)	Total	Of all (%)	Change (%)
Labour	37	6	0	▲6	66.1	—N/a	49.4	▼0.8
Conservative	19	0	5	▼5	33.9	—N/a	39.4	▼5.4
Liberal	0	0	1	▼1	0.0	—N/a	11.0	▲6.1
Others	0	0	0	Steady	0.0	—N/a	0.2	▲0.1
Total	56					—N/a		

== See also ==
- 1964 United Kingdom general election in Northern Ireland
- 1964 United Kingdom general election in Scotland
- 1964 United Kingdom general election in Wales
