= Eldon Griffiths =

British politician and journalist (1925-2014)

Sir Eldon Griffiths

Minister for Sport
- In office 19 June 1970 – 4 March 1974
- Prime Minister: Edward Heath
- Preceded by: Denis Howell
- Succeeded by: Denis Howell

Member of Parliament for Bury St Edmunds
- In office 14 May 1964 – 16 March 1992
- Preceded by: William Traven Aitken
- Succeeded by: Richard Spring

Personal details
- Born: 25 May 1925 Wigan, Lancashire, England
- Died: 3 June 2014 (aged 89)
- Party: Conservative
- Spouse(s): Sigrid Gante (m. 1949; div. 1985) Betty Stannard (m. 1985; died 2010) Susan Donnell (m. 2013)
- Children: 2, including John Griffiths
- Education: Emmanuel College, Cambridge
- Profession: Journalist and farmer

Sir Eldon Wylie Griffiths (25 May 1925 – 3 June 2014) was a British Conservative politician and journalist.

== Early life ==
Griffiths was born on 25 May 1925 in Wigan, Lancashire. His Welsh father was a police sergeant. He attended Ashton-under-Lyne Grammar School. Following the Second World War service in the Royal Air Force he gained a double first class degree in history from Emmanuel College, Cambridge, and an MA from Yale University.

== Career ==
=== Journalism ===
After university Griffiths worked in the Conservative Research Department and became a journalist and farmer. He was on staff of US magazine Newsweek, as managing editor.

=== Political career ===
He became the MP for Bury St Edmunds after a by-election in 1964, and represented the seat until he retired in 1992. His Daily Telegraph obituary claimed he was "rangy, articulate, but dour... a political loner, and not over-popular on the Tory benches." However, it listed many achievements as MP and in other spheres. He served as Minister for Sport during the Edward Heath government of 1970 to 1974. He also served as parliamentary spokesman for the Police Federation. In 1985, he was made a Knight Bachelor for "political service".

=== Academia ===
For a brief period while an MP, Griffiths worked as a professor at the University of California, Irvine, a role in which The Times said led to him being called the member for Orange County.

=== Director appointments ===
Griffiths was a director of one of Gerald Carroll's Carroll Group companies.

== Personal life ==
In June 2013, aged 88, he announced his third marriage, to Susan Donnell.

== Honours ==
He was a Freeman of the borough of St Edmundsbury.

Parliament of the United Kingdom
Preceded by William Aitken	Member of Parliament for Bury St Edmunds; 1964–1992	Succeeded by Richard Spring
Political offices
Preceded by Denis Howell	Minister for Sport; 1970–1974	Succeeded by Denis Howell
