= Michael Fogarty (politician) =

British politician and academic

Michael Patrick Fogarty (3 October 1916 – 20 January 2001), was a British Liberal Party politician and academic.

== Background ==
He was the son of Philip Christopher Fogarty, ICS, and Mary Belle Pye of Galway. He was educated at Ampleforth College and Christ Church, Oxford. In 1939 he married Phyllis Clark. They had two sons and two daughters.

== Professional career ==
He was Professor of Industrial Relations, University College of Wales, Cardiff. He was Director, Institute for Family and Environmental Research, 1981–84.

== Political career ==
His first venture into political activity was with the Labour Party. In 1938 he was adopted as Prospective Parliamentary Candidate for Tamworth. However, the expected 1939/40 General Election did not take place and come 1944 the constituency was abolished. He did not contest the 1945 General Election. He left the Labour Party and joined the Liberal Party. From 1964 to 1966 he was Vice-President of the Liberal Party. He was also Vice-President of the Association of University Teachers from 1964 to 1966. He was Liberal candidate for the Devizes division of Wiltshire at the 1964 Devizes by-election and again at the 1964 and 1966 General Elections. On each occasion he finished third. He was Liberal candidate for the Abingdon division at both the 1974 General Elections, both times finishing third. He did not stand for parliament again. In 1979 he stood as Liberal candidate for Thames Valley in the first European Parliament elections. He was elected a District Councillor in the Vale of White Horse, serving from 1973 to 1987. He was elected a County Councillor in Oxfordshire, serving from 1981 to 1989; he was Vice-Chairman 1985–86 and Chairman 1986–87.

=== Electoral contests ===
1964 Devizes by-election
Party	Candidate	Votes	%	±%
Conservative	Charles Morrison	19,554	46.9	−4.5
Labour	Irving HH Rogers	17,884	42.9	+1.0
Liberal	Michael Fogarty	4,281	10.2	+3.5
Majority		1,670	4.0	
Turnout		41,719	75.8	
Conservative hold		Swing		

General Election 1964: Devizes
Party	Candidate	Votes	%	±%
Conservative	Charles Morrison	21,118	46.8	−0.1
Labour	Irving HH Rogers	17,170	38.0	−4.9
Liberal	Michael Fogarty	6,881	15.2	+5.0
Majority		3,948	8.7	+4.7
Turnout			81.4	
Conservative hold		Swing		

General Election 1966: Devizes
Party	Candidate	Votes	%	±%
Conservative	Charles Morrison	21,429	44.7	−2.1
Labour	Ian Hamilton	18,832	39.2	+1.2
Liberal	Michael Fogarty	7,730	16.1	+0.9
Majority		2,597	5.4	−3.3
Turnout			81.0	−0.4
Conservative hold		Swing		

General Election February 1974: Abingdon
Party	Candidate	Votes	%	±%
Conservative	Airey Neave	34,771	46.8	−7.6
Labour	DEH Moriarty	21,028	28.3	−6.5
Liberal	Michael Fogarty	18,458	24.9	+14.1
Majority		13,743	18.5	−1.1
Turnout			83.0	
Conservative hold		Swing		

General Election October 1974: Abingdon
Party	Candidate	Votes	%	±%
Conservative	Airey Neave	31,956	46.6	−0.2
Labour	DEH Moriarty	21,319	31.1	+2.8
Liberal	Michael Fogarty	15,239	22.2	−2.6
Majority		10,637	15.5	
Turnout			75.7	
Conservative hold		Swing		
