= 1964 Winchester by-election =

UK Parliamentary by-election

The 1964 Winchester by-election was held on 14 May 1964. It was held after the incumbent Conservative MP Peter Smithers was appointed as the Secretary-General of the Council of Europe. It was retained for the Conservative Party by their candidate Morgan Morgan-Giles.

== Background ==
The by-election was one of four (the others being Bury St Edmunds, Devizes and Rutherglen being held on the same day in which the seat was being defended by a candidate supporting the incumbent Conservative government. With a general election due later in the year, the results were anticipated with interest as pointer to what might happen at the election. According to The Glasgow Herald, unlike the other three seats, Winchester was expected to be an easy win for the Conservatives, although it was expected that the Conservative majority would be cut.

== Result ==
Winchester by-election, 1964
Party	Candidate	Votes	%	±%
Conservative	Morgan Morgan-Giles	18,032	52.17	−15.09
Labour	C. Patrick Seyd	11,968	34.62	+1.88
Liberal	J. Edwards	4,567	13.21	New
Majority		6,064	17.55	−26.98
Turnout		34,567		
Conservative hold		Swing		

== Aftermath ==
While the Conservatives held Winchester, it was reported that if the swing of 8.5% from Conservative to Labour were repeated at the general election it would give the latter a majority of over 170 seats. However, the result at Devizes showed a much lower swing to Labour. The Conservatives lost Rutherglen, but held Bury St Edmund's, the last of the seats to declare, with what was reported by The Glasgow Herald to be a smaller swing against them than expected. The same newspaper noted that while the four results gave a mixed picture, with Winchester seeing the biggest swing against the Conservatives, overall they cast doubt on opinion polls suggesting a significant national Labour lead and perhaps would give Harold Wilson "the first faint incredulous thoughts" that he might not prevail at the coming general election.
