= 1964 Devizes by-election =

UK Parliamentary by-election

The 1964 Devizes by-election was held on 14 May 1964 after the death of the incumbent Conservative MP, Percivall Pott. It was won by the Conservative candidate Charles Morrison a member of Wiltshire County Council and chair of its Education Committee. Opinion poll forecasts and against the trend in the three other by-elections held on the same day were predicting a Labour win. The surprise victory was attributed to Morrison being well-known, popular and active in the constituency. His campaign had the support of Ian Fleming, a relation by marriage of Morrison's wife Sara, who wrote an article called To Westminster with Love beginning with the words "Charles Morrison - Licensed to Kill."

== Background ==
The by-election was held on the same day as three others with the Conservatives also defending seats in contests at Bury St Edmunds, Rutherglen and Winchester. On the day of the election, an article in The Glasgow Herald reported that Labour and the Conservatives claimed to be confident of victory in Devizes. The same article speculated that whichever party won, their majority would likely not be much greater than 1,500 votes, and noted that "new hope would be put into many faint Conservative hearts" if the party held the seat. The seat had gained around 4,000 new voters since the last general election, and according to the same report two thirds of these were thought likely to be Labour voters.

== Result ==
Devizes By-Election, 1964
Party	Candidate	Votes	%	±%
Conservative	Charles Morrison	19,554	46.87	−4.54
Labour	Irving Rogers	17,884	42.87	+1.00
Liberal	Michael Patrick Fogarty	4,281	10.26	New
Majority		1,670	4.00	−5.54
Turnout		41,719		
Conservative hold		Swing		

== Reaction ==
The Labour MP Tony Benn, who campaigned in the constituency during the by-election partly as the Labour candidate was the son of his own agent, recorded in his diary on polling day that he had been told at lunch by his friend the psephologist David Butler, that Labour would "win Devizes quite comfortably". The following day he described in his diary the loss of the seat by 1,000 votes as "a real set-back" for Labour's hopes of victory in the forthcoming general election.

The following morning, when the Bury St Edmunds result was still unknown, The Glasgow Herald contrasted the Devizes result with that in Rutherglen, which Labour had gained, and Winchester where there was an 8.5% swing to Labour despite the Conservatives retaining the seat. The report noted that holding Devizes Would "hearten" the Conservatives and expressed surprise that the swing to Labour was just 2.7%. However it also observed that Morrison had possibly benefited from being the only local candidate and having been supported by "a superb organisation".
