= 1964 Colombian parliamentary election =

Parliamentary elections were held in Colombia on 15 March 1964 to elect the Chamber of Representatives. Under the National Front agreement, only the Conservative Party and the Liberal Party were able to contest the elections, with 50% of the seats in both houses allocated to each party. As a result, the main contest at the elections was between factions within each party.

== Results ==
Party and faction		Votes	%	Seats	+/–
Colombian; Liberal; Party	Frentenacionalistas	738,437	32.77	59	0
Colombian; Liberal; Party	Liberal Revolutionary Movement (soft)	284,952	12.65	23	–
Colombian; Liberal; Party	Liberal Revolutionary Movement (hard)	96,895	4.30	8	–
Colombian; Liberal; Party	National Popular Alliance	16,495	0.73	1	New
Colombian; Liberal; Party	Liberal Independent Movement	7,129	0.32	1	New
Colombian; Liberal; Party	Others	14,090	0.63	0	–
Colombian; Liberal; Party	Total	1,157,998	51.39	92	0
Colombian; Conservative; Party	Frentenacionalistas	794,000	35.23	65	–21
Colombian; Conservative; Party	National Popular Alliance	293,183	13.01	26	+20
Colombian; Conservative; Party	Others	8,282	0.37	1	+1
Colombian; Conservative; Party	Total	1,095,465	48.61	92	0
Total		2,253,463	100.00	184	0
Valid votes		2,253,463	99.66		
Invalid/blank votes		7,727	0.34		
Total votes		2,261,190	100.00		
Registered voters/turnout		6,135,628	36.85		
Source: Nohlen
