= United Kingdom membership of the European Economic Area =

The United Kingdom (UK) was a member of the European Economic Area (EEA) from 1 January 1994 to 31 December 2020, following the coming into force of the 1992 EEA Agreement (as adjusted by a 1993 protocol). Membership of the EEA is a consequence of membership of the European Union (EU). The UK ceased to be a Contracting Party to the EEA Agreement after its withdrawal from the EU on 31 January 2020, as it was a member of the EEA by virtue of its EU membership, but retained EEA rights during the Brexit transition period, based on Article 126 of the withdrawal agreement between the EU and the UK. During the transition period, which ended on 31 December 2020, the UK and EU negotiated their future relationship.

The EFTA members of the EEA and the UK signed a Separation Agreement on 28 January 2020. The Separation Agreement mirrors the relevant parts of the EU–UK Withdrawal Agreement.

Following the completion of its withdrawal from the EU, the UK could have sought to continue to be a member of the EEA through mechanisms available to members of the European Free Trade Association (EFTA). Theresa May, then Prime Minister of the United Kingdom, stated in 2017 that the British government would not seek permanent membership of the European Single Market.

== Withdrawal from the EEA ==
The United Kingdom was a member of the European Economic Area as a member of the European Union. In January 2017, the then Prime Minister of the United Kingdom Theresa May confirmed in January 2017 that the government would not seek to participate in the European single market following the UK's withdrawal from the European Union, since that would require accepting free movement of people and the jurisdiction of the European Court of Justice. The UK remained a member of the EEA until the end of the Brexit transition period on 31 December 2020.

In addition to the withdrawal agreement which it signed with the EU, the UK signed separate withdrawal agreements with the three EEA member states which were not also EU members: Norway, Iceland, and Liechtenstein.

== Potential EEA participation through EFTA ==
The UK was one of the founding members of the European Free Trade Association (EFTA) in 1960, but left in 1972 to join the European Economic Community, which later became the EU. If it were to rejoin EFTA, it would be given the option to apply to participate in the EEA under Article 128 of the EEA Agreement between EFTA and the EU. This was one option presented to the Parliament of the United Kingdom in a 2013 research paper which discussed alternatives to the UK's membership in the EU that would allow it to continue participating in the European single market. Participating in the EEA as a member of EFTA rather than the EU would mean that the UK would be exempt from certain EU agreements such as the Common Agricultural Policy and the EU Customs Union, which it was subject to while it was a member of the EU.

In the first meeting of EFTA members following the UK's vote to withdraw from the EU, EFTA indicated that they were open to the prospect of the UK rejoining, with Swiss president Johann Schneider-Ammann stating that EFTA would be strengthened by the UK's return. However, the Norwegian minister for European affairs expressed reservations, stating in an interview with Aftenposten that allowing country as large as the UK into EFTA would "shift the balance," and was not necessarily in Norway's interest. The UK would require unanimous approval from EFTA's current members in order to join the association, potentially allowing Norway to veto its membership.

=== Scottish membership of EFTA ===
In contrast to England and Wales, Scotland voted to remain in the EU during the 2016 referendum. Following the referendum, the Scottish Government investigated the possibility of joining EFTA in order to retain Scotland's access to the EEA. However, EFTA members have stated that membership is only open to sovereign nations, so Scotland would not be allowed to join unless it were to become independent from the UK.

== See also ==
- Brexit
- European Union (Withdrawal) Act 2018
