= 1964 Louisiana lieutenant gubernatorial election =

- March 3, 1964
Nominee	Taddy Aycock
Party	Democratic
Popular vote	478,358
Percentage	100.00%
- Parish results Aycock: 90–100%
Lieutenant Governor before election
Taddy Aycock
Democratic
Elected Lieutenant Governor
Taddy Aycock
Democratic

The 1964 Louisiana lieutenant gubernatorial election was held on March 3, 1964, in order to elect the lieutenant governor of Louisiana. Democratic nominee and incumbent lieutenant governor Taddy Aycock won re-election as he ran unopposed.

== General election ==
On election day, March 3, 1964, Democratic nominee Taddy Aycock won re-election with 478,358 votes as he ran unopposed, thereby retaining Democratic control over the office of lieutenant governor. Aycock was sworn in for his second term on May 12, 1964.

=== Results ===
Louisiana lieutenant gubernatorial election, 1964
Party	Candidate	Votes	%
Democratic	Taddy Aycock (incumbent)	478,358	100.00
Total votes		478,358	100.00
Democratic hold			
