= 1964 United Kingdom general election in Northern Ireland =

1964 UK general election in Northern Ireland

- 15 October 1964

All 12 Northern Ireland seats in the House of Commons
- Turnout: 71.7% (▲5.8 pp)
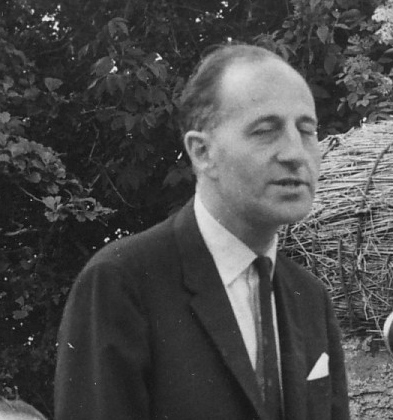
	First party	Second party
		Lab
Leader	Terence O'Neill	Tom Boyd
Party	UUP	NI Labour
Alliance	Conservative	Labour
Leader since	1963	1958
Leader's seat	Sat in Stormont	Sat in Stormont
Last election	12 seats, 77.2%	0 seats, 7.7%
Seats won	12	0
Seat change	Steady	Steady
Popular vote	401,897	102,759
Percentage	63.2%	16.1%
Swing	▼14.0 pp	▲8.4 pp

On 15 October 1964, the 1964 United Kingdom general election was held in Northern Ireland, to elect all 630 members of the House of Commons, including the 12 Northern Ireland seats.

The Ulster Unionists won all the seats in region, as they had at the previous election.

In the election as a whole, the Conservative Party, which included the Ulster Unionists, led by Sir Alec Douglas-Home, lost their majority, lost power after thirteen years in government. The Labour Party won a narrow majority and Harold Wilson was appointed as Prime Minister.

== Candidates ==
Affiliation	Candidates
Ulster Unionist Party	12
Independent Republican (Ireland)	12
Northern Ireland Labour Party	10
Ulster Liberal Party	4
Republican Labour Party	1
Total	39

== Results ==
Party	Seats					Aggregate Votes		
Party	Total	Gains	Losses	Net	Of all (%)	Total	Of all (%)	Difference
UUP	12	0	0	Steady	100.0	401,897	63.2	▼14.0
NI Labour	0	0	0	Steady	—	102,759	16.1	▲8.4
Ind. Republican	0	Did not stand in 1959			—	101,628	15.9	—N/a
Ulster Liberal	0	0	0	Steady	—	17,354	2.7	▲2.1
Republican Labour	0	New			—	14,678	2.3	New
Blank and invalid votes						2,320	—	—
Total	12			0	100.0	638,316 (Note: All valid votes excluding spoiled votes.)	100.0	0.0
Registered voters, and turnout						890,552	71.7	▲5.8

Popular vote
UUP	63.0%
NI Labour	16.1%
Ind. Republican	15.9%
Ulster Liberal	2.7%
Republican Labour	2.3%

Parliamentary seats
UUP	100.0%

== MPs elected ==
Constituency	Party	MP
Antrim North	UUP	Henry Clark
Antrim South	UUP	Knox Cunningham
Armagh	UUP	John Maginnis
Belfast East	UUP	Stanley McMaster
Belfast North	UUP	Stratton Mills
Belfast South	UUP	Rafton Pounder
Belfast West	UUP	Patricia McLaughlin
Down North	UUP	George Currie
Down South	UUP	Lawrence Orr
Fermanagh and South Tyrone	UUP	Marquess of Abercorn
Londonderry	UUP	Robin Chichester-Clark
Mid Ulster	UUP	George Forrest

== See also ==
- 1964 United Kingdom general election in England
- 1964 United Kingdom general election in Scotland
- 1964 United Kingdom general election in Wales
