= 1964 United Arab Republic parliamentary election =

- 10 March 1964
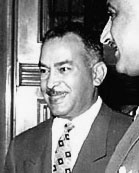
	First party
Leader	Ali Sabri
Party	ASU
Seats won	350
Percentage	100%
Prime Minister before election
Ali Sabri
ASU
Subsequent Prime Minister
Ali Sabri
ASU

Parliamentary elections were held in the United Arab Republic (now Egypt) on 10 March 1964, with a second round on 19 March. At the time the country was a one-party state and all candidates had to be members of the Arab Socialist Union (ASU). A total of 1,750 candidates contested the 350 elected seats. A further ten members were appointed by President Gamal Abdel Nasser.

== Results ==
Party	Seats
Arab Socialist Union	350
Presidential appointees	10
Total	360
Source: Nohlen et al.
