= 1964 Bury St Edmunds by-election =

UK Parliamentary by-election

The Bury St Edmunds by-election of 1964 was held on 14 May 1964 after the death of the incumbent Conservative MP, Sir William Aitken. It was retained by the Conservative candidate Eldon Griffiths.

The by-election was one of four (the others being Rutherglen, Devizes and Winchester) being held on the same day in which the seat was being defended by a candidate supporting the incumbent Conservative government. With a general election due later in the year, the results were anticipated with interest as a pointer to what might happen at the election, with the Labour candidate in Bury St Edmunds confidently predicting victory. The Glasgow Herald noted that his prediction would require a swing of over 8% and even if this prediction was achieved he would have such a small majority that the Conservatives would regain the seat later in the year.

== Result ==
Bury St Edmunds by-election, 1964
Party	Candidate	Votes	%	±%
Conservative	Eldon Griffiths	22,141	49.0	−9.8
Labour	Noel Insley	19,682	43.5	+2.2
Liberal	Richard Afton	3,387	7.5	New
Majority		2,459	5.5	−12.0
Turnout		45,210		
Conservative hold		Swing		

== Outcome ==
Of the four concurrent by-elections, it was the result at Bury St Edmunds which was the last to be known. The swing of 6% to Labour was less than that it achieved in Winchester and Rutherglen, the latter of which Labour gained, but better than in Devizes. The Glasgow Herald stated that the result was better for the Conservatives than had been expected and combined with others cast doubt on opinion polls suggesting a significant national Labour lead. It suggested that there was now hope among Conservatives that the political tide was turning in their favour.
