= 1964 Rutherglen by-election =

UK parliamentary by-election

There was a 1964 by-election for the constituency of Rutherglen in the UK House of Commons on 14 May 1964, not long before the 1964 general election.

It was a Labour gain from the Conservatives, the candidate was Gregor Mackenzie. Unlike some by-election gains, it was held at the next general election and eventually became a fairly safe Labour seat, with Mackenzie serving as MP until 1987. The defeated Conservative candidate, Iain Sproat, later served as the MP for Aberdeen South and Harwich. The Scottish National Party decided not to contest the election, even though it was party policy to contest all Scottish by-elections.

== Background ==
The by-election was one of four (the others being Bury St Edmunds, Devizes and Winchester being held on the same day in which the seat was being defended by a candidate supporting the incumbent Conservative government. With a general election due later in the year, the results were anticipated with interest as a pointer to what might happen at the election. It was felt voter turnout could be crucial and Sproat's agent, F. W. S. Craig had arranged for 1000 party workers and 300 cars to be active on polling day. The Glasgow Herald felt that Sproat could win if turnout was over 80%.

== Result ==
Rutherglen by-election, 1964
Party	Candidate	Votes	%	±%
Labour	Gregor Mackenzie	18,885	55.51	+7.58
Conservative	Iain Sproat	15,138	44.49	−7.58
Majority		3,747	11.02	N/A
Turnout		34,023		
Labour gain from Conservative		Swing	+7.6	

== Aftermath ==
The result showed a considerable swing of 7.6% against the government. While it held Winchester, there was an even larger swing of 8.5% against the Conservatives there. The Glasgow Herald considered the result in Rutherglen significant as the Conservatives had won the seat in 1951 when they had a small overall majority and swings were usually less pronounced in Scotland than the rest of the UK. The newspaper suggested that if the results were repeated at a general election the Labour Party would have a majority of about 120 seats. An editorial in The Glasgow Herald the day after the election said that while the Conservatives holding Devizes perhaps suggested the party's fortunes were improving in England, the Rutherglen result was "a rank bad one" for the party, which did not suggest that any recovery in their position was taking place in Scotland. Indeed, it further noted that there been a swing to Labour in Scotland in 1959 against the UK-wide trend, and the result suggested Labour was further improving upon this. The Herald's editorial argued that it was still possible for the Conservatives to improve their position in Scotland before the general election, which was expected to be held in October, but that the party needed to widen its Scottish horizons and improve its presentation to show the economic and political improvements the government had carried out. A further editorial the following day was more pessimistic about the Conservatives chances, particularly in Scotland. It argued the Rutherglen result "marks another stage of a Conservative decline in industrial Scotland" which had started before the 1959 general election. It also rejected the idea that Sproat's defeat could be blamed on him being an inexperienced candidate who got out of his depth, arguing that the shortcomings of a candidate should be blamed on those in the party who had selected and advised them. It concluded that the Rutherglen defeat "should at least shake the Scottish Conservatives out of the assumption that things could hardly get worse."

Mackenzie claimed the "positive swing to Labour" meant that the seat could not be considered marginal and the result was "bound to stand" at the forthcoming general election. In contrast Alec Douglas-Home wrote in a letter to Sproat that he was sure he would regain the seat for the Conservatives in the autumn. Ultimately Mackenzie's assessment proved to be correct with him easily holding the seat at the next contest in October.
