= 1964 United Kingdom general election =

- 15 October 1964

All 630 seats in the House of Commons 316 seats needed for a majority
- Opinion polls
- Registered: 35,894,054
- Turnout: 27,657,148; 77.1% (▼1.7 pp)
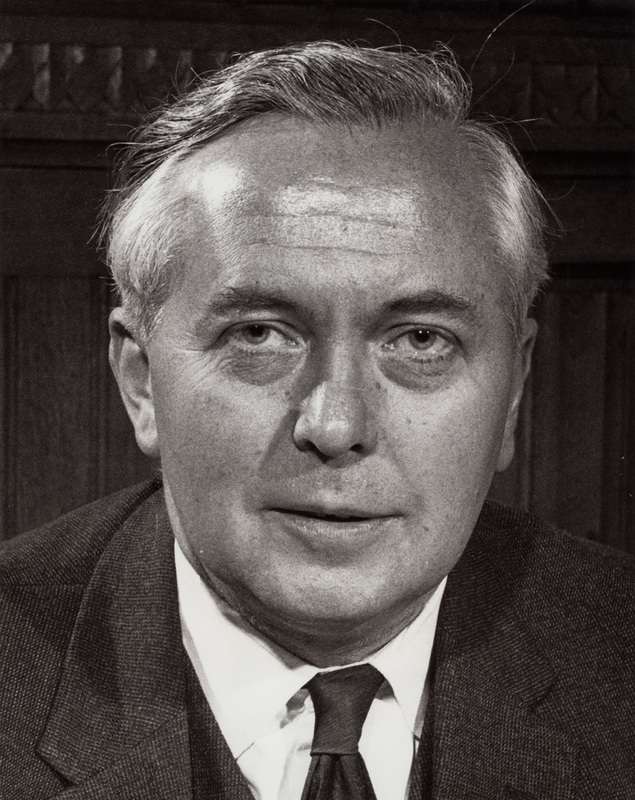

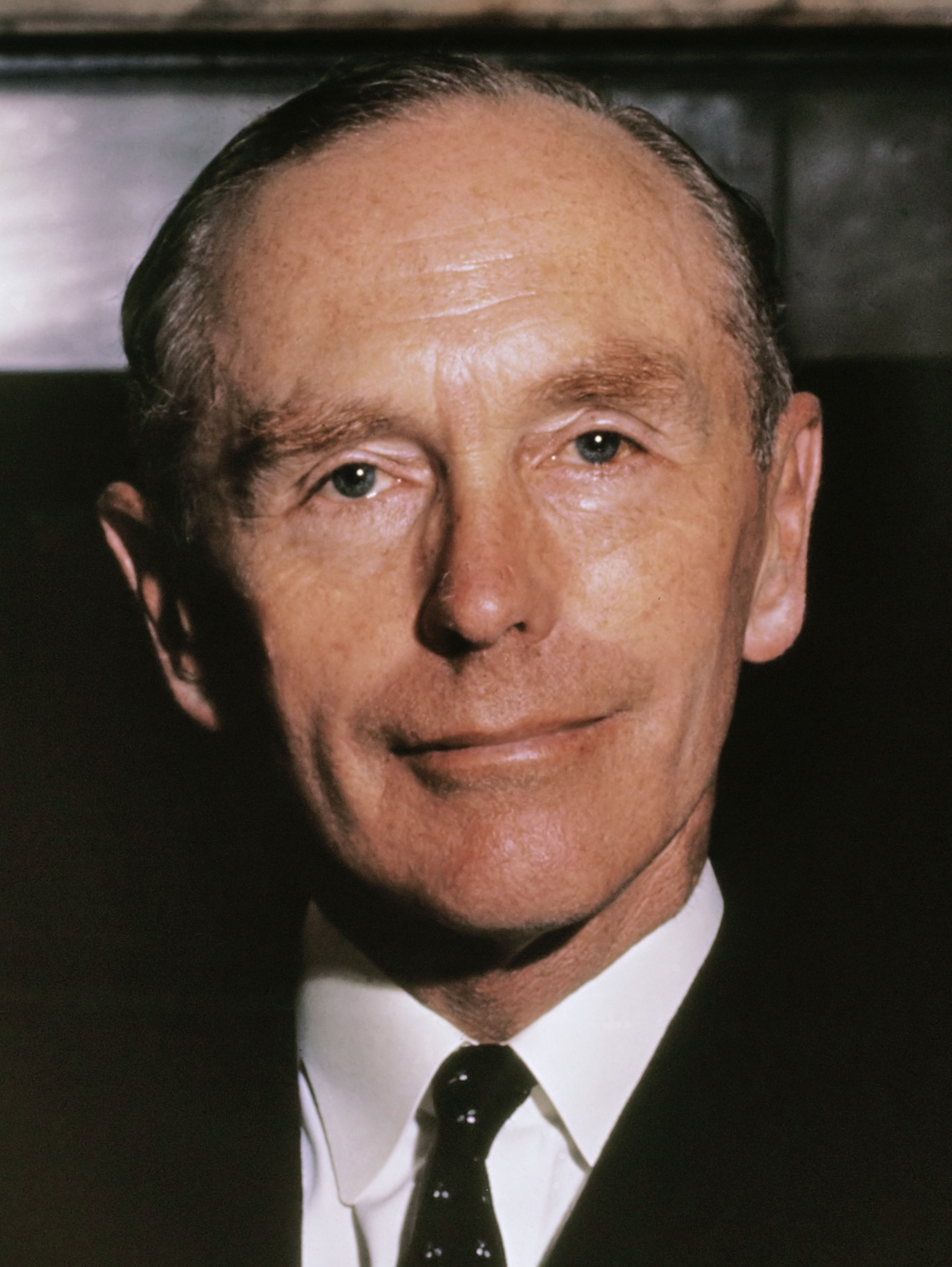

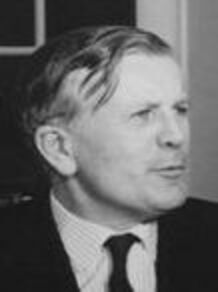
| | First party | Second party | Third party |
|---|---|---|---|
| Leader | Harold Wilson | Alec Douglas-Home | Jo Grimond |
| Party | Labour | Conservative | Liberal |
| Leader since | 14 February 1963 | 18 October 1963 | 5 November 1956 |
| Leader's seat | Huyton | Kinross and Western Perthshire | Orkney and Shetland |
| Last election | 258 seats, 43.8% | 365 seats, 49.4% | 6 seats, 5.9% |
| Seats won | 317 | 304 (Note: Figure includes Speaker of the House of Commons Sir Harry Hylton-Foster in Cities of London and Westminster, elected as such just after the general election.) | 9 |
| Seat change | ▲59 | ▼61 | ▲3 |
| Popular vote | 12,205,808 | 12,002,642 | 3,099,283 |
| Percentage | 44.1% | 43.4% | 11.2% |
| Swing | ▲0.3 pp | ▼6.0 pp | ▲5.3 pp |
- Colours denote the winning party—as shown in § Results

- Composition of the House of Commons after the election
Prime Minister before election
Alec Douglas-Home
Conservative
Prime Minister after election
Harold Wilson
Labour

A general election was held in the United Kingdom on Thursday, 15 October 1964. It resulted in the Conservatives, led by Prime Minister Alec Douglas-Home, narrowly losing to the Labour Party, led by Harold Wilson; Labour secured a parliamentary majority of four seats and ended its thirteen years in opposition since the 1951 election. At age 47, Wilson became the youngest Prime Minister since Lord Rosebery in 1894.

== Background ==
Both major parties had changed leadership in 1963. Following the sudden death of Labour leader Hugh Gaitskell early in the year, the party chose Harold Wilson (at the time, thought of as being on the party's centre-left), while Alec Douglas-Home, at the time the Earl of Home, had taken over as Conservative leader and Prime Minister in October after Harold Macmillan announced his resignation in the wake of the Profumo affair. Douglas-Home shortly afterward disclaimed his peerage under the Peerage Act 1963 in order to lead the party from the Commons, subsequently standing in the Kinross and Western Perthshire by-election.

Macmillan had led the Conservative government since January 1957. Despite initial popularity and a resounding election victory in 1959, he had become increasingly unpopular in the early 1960s, due to rising unemployment and inflation during the recession of 1960–1961 and the United States' cancellation of the Skybolt program intended to provide Britain with an independent nuclear weapons delivery system after the cancellation of the Blue Streak project. Although Macmillan ended the latter crisis with the Nassau Agreement guaranteeing US assistance in the Polaris programme of submarine-launched ballistic missiles, this also indirectly harmed his reputation after French President Charles de Gaulle vetoed Britain's accession bid to the European Communities over his scepticism of the Anglo-American "Special Relationship."

However, the Labour Party was temporarily divided due to the death of Gaitskell in 1963 and the subsequent leadership election. Although Wilson won this election against his opponents George Brown and James Callaghan, he was mistrusted within the party because of his previous unsuccessful leadership challenge to Gaitskell in 1960. The party also suffered from internal policy disputes over unilateral nuclear disarmament and Clause IV of its constitution, which committed it to nationalisation of industry.

It was for a while thought likely that the Conservatives would win the scheduled 1964 general election, albeit with a reduced majority, but the emergence of the Profumo affair in March 1963 and Macmillan's handling of the matter all but destroyed the credibility of his government. While he survived a vote of no confidence in June 1963, polling indicated that Labour would win the next election comfortably if Macmillan remained in power, which, along with health issues, prompted Macmillan to announce his resignation in the autumn of 1963.

Douglas-Home faced a difficult task in rebuilding the party's popularity with just a year elapsing between taking office and having to face a general election. Wilson had begun to try to tie the Labour Party to the growing confidence of Britain in the 1960s, asserting that the "white heat of revolution" would sweep away "restrictive practices ... on both sides of industry". The Liberal Party enjoyed a resurgence after a virtual wipeout in the 1950s, and doubled its share of the vote, primarily at the expense of the Conservatives. Although Labour did not increase its vote share significantly, the fall in support for the Conservatives led to Wilson securing an overall majority of four seats. This proved to be unworkable, and Wilson called a snap election in 1966.

== Campaign ==
The pre-election campaign was prolonged, as Douglas-Home delayed calling a general election to give himself as much time as possible to improve the prospects of his party. The Labour Party indicated that it held high popular support by winning the 1964 London local elections. Conservative leaders became more optimistic about their chances after winning three by-elections in Winchester, Bury St. Edmunds, and Devizes. The election campaign formally began on 25 September 1964 when Douglas-Home saw Queen Elizabeth II and asked for a dissolution of Parliament. The dissolution notably occurred without a formal royal prorogation and recall for the first time since 1922.

The campaign was dominated by some of the more voluble characters of the political scene at the time. While George Brown, deputy leader of the Labour Party, toured the country making energetic speeches (and the occasional gaffe), Quintin Hogg was a leading spokesman for the Conservatives. The image of Hogg lashing out at a Wilson poster with his walking stick was one of the most striking of the campaign.

The Labour Party campaigned on what historian Andrew Thorpe called "the basis of revisionism given a significant twist in the direction of Wilsonian planning, and a more dirigiste approach to industrial modernization." Labour's manifesto Let's Go with Labour for New Britain reflected Wilson's belief that social justice and technological progress would transform industry to create a planned economy capable of providing full employment, rapid economic growth, favourable balance of trade, and control of inflation. Party leaders also decided that they had lost the previous election because of their failure to appeal to the growing middle class, and adjusted strategy accordingly.

Labour called for greater co-ordination between state-run enterprises and repeated its past pledges for the renationalisation of the steel and road haulage industries, but declared that it would not nationalise any further industries. The party also promised expansions of social services, tax reform, and what would become the prices and incomes policy to control inflation. In education it sought comprehensivisation of secondary education and a higher school-leaving age, while in immigration it sought both immigration quotas restricting future entry and equal rights for immigrants who had already arrived in the country. In foreign policy it pledged a re-evaluation of previous governments' foreign aid and alliances, increased British assertiveness at the United Nations, and a build-up of the conventional components of the British Armed Forces, but did not promise unilateral nuclear disarmament as some left-wing members of the party desired. While early campaigning suggested that a Labour government would abandon the Polaris nuclear weapons programme, Wilson quickly decided to avoid this topic altogether due to the continuing popularity of an independent British nuclear deterrent. Labour's platform of a "socialist foreign policy" also criticised the Conservative government for its handling of a scandal involving the British defence contractor Ferranti, the Aden Emergency, Cypriot intercommunal violence, the escalation of the Vietnam War, arms sales to apartheid South Africa, and a contract to construct naval frigates for Francoist Spain.

Douglas-Home's unpopularity – caused by his aristocratic background, his accession to the premiership without a formal election, his economic and trade policies, and the side-lining of popular Conservative leaders such as Enoch Powell and Iain Macleod – harmed the Conservative Party in the election. Even many Conservatives condemned Douglas-Home for the Resale Prices Act 1964 abolishing resale price maintenance. Douglas-Home's predecessor Macmillan described him as an "urbane but resolute character — iron painted to look like wood". However, his campaigning did allow the Conservative Party's gap in the polls to narrow. The Conservative manifesto Prosperity with a Purpose pledged closer relations with the Atlantic world and the Commonwealth of Nations, development of nuclear power, industrial retraining, increased capital investment in British industry, and continued development of the BAC TSR-2 supersonic aircraft project. The Conservative campaign emphasised the party's diplomatic successes, such as the Nassau Agreement, the Partial Nuclear Test Ban Treaty, and the defence of Malaysia in the Borneo Confrontation. Although the Conservatives made limited appeals to new Caribbean, African, and South Asian immigrants by printing campaign literature in Hindi and Urdu, it defended the Commonwealth Immigrants Act 1962 restricting immigration of Commonwealth citizens.

As in previous elections since its decline, the Liberal Party under Jo Grimond's leadership positioned itself as a non-socialist, individualist alternative to Labour. The two key domestic policy pledges in its manifesto Think for Yourself, Vote Liberal were healthcare reform and devolution for Scotland and Wales. The Liberals also were distinguished by their internationalist and pro-European foreign policy, becoming the first major party to endorse British membership in the European Economic Union. Supporters and leaders of the Liberal Party hoped for a breakthrough in 1964 which would re-establish it as a powerful force in British politics after its near-extinction in the 1950s; the party's surprise victory in the 1962 Orpington by-election, its first in a seat outside of the "Celtic fringe" of Wales, Scotland, and the West Country in over a decade, had created optimism and a sense of momentum for a recovery. However, by 1964 the Liberals had lost much of their momentum to a series of by-election and local election losses, and faced growing financial difficulties.

Many party speakers, especially at televised rallies, had to deal with hecklers; in particular Douglas-Home was treated very roughly at a meeting in Birmingham. Douglas-Home's speeches dealt with the future of the nuclear deterrent, while fears of Britain's relative decline on the world stage, reflected in chronic balance of payment problems, helped the Labour Party's case.

By 1964, television had developed as a medium and played a much greater role than in previous British elections. The election received more coverage from current affairs programs such as BBC1's Panorama, Associated-Rediffusion's This Week, and Granada Television's World in Action, as well as political satire inspired by the success of That Was the Week That Was. The election night was broadcast live by BBC Television, presented for the fifth and final time by Richard Dimbleby, with Robin Day, Ian Trethowan, Cliff Michelmore and David Butler co-presenting.

== Opinion polling ==
- NOP: Lab swing 3.5% (Lab majority of 12)
- Gallup: Lab swing 4% (Lab majority of 23)
- Research Services: Lab swing 2.75% (Con majority of 30)
- Daily Express: Lab swing of 1.75% (Con majority of 60) (Note: This summary of opinion poll findings from the last few days of the campaign is given early in the BBC's election night coverage.)

== Aftermath ==
The Conservatives made a surprising recovery from being well behind Labour when Home became prime minister, and would have won if 900 voters in eight seats had changed votes. Labour won a very slim majority of four seats, forming a government for the first time since 1951. Labour achieved a swing of just over 3%, although its vote rose by only 0.3% and it earned a lesser number of votes than in its previous defeats of 1955 and 1959. The main shift in votes was a 5.7% swing from the Conservatives to the Liberals. The Liberals defied popular expectations of a net loss and won nearly twice as many votes as in 1959, partly because they fielded 150 more candidates. Although this was the Liberals' best electoral performance since the 1929 general election and left the party in a key parliamentary position due to Labour's slender majority, it failed to regain its pre-World War II status as a party of government as it had hoped. Wilson became Prime Minister, replacing Douglas-Home; Labour's four-seat majority was not sustainable for a full Parliament, and Wilson ultimately called another general election in 1966 which saw his majority expanded. In particular, the small majority meant the government could not implement its policy of renationalising the steel industry due to the opposition of backbenchers Woodrow Wyatt and Desmond Donnelly.

89 female candidates stood in the election, with 29 women being elected as MPs (11 for the Conservatives and 18 for Labour).

This was the only election in Britain's recent history when all seats were won by the three main parties: no minor parties, independents or splinter groups won any seats. It is also the only time that both Labour and the Conservatives have taken over 300 seats each, and was the last election in which any one party (the Conservatives) contested every single seat. The Conservatives had previously chose not to contest certain Liberal-held seats as per local-level agreements to avoid vote splitting, but ended that policy at this election. The resultant splitting of votes actually helped grant Labour a majority, by throwing two formerly Liberal-held seats in northern England to Labour; however, the outcome of the election would not have been meaningfully altered had the Liberals retained the seats, as Labour would still have had as many seats as the other two parties combined, and Liberal leader Jo Grimond did not want to support a Conservative minority government.

Douglas-Home told D. R. Thorpe that the most important reason for the Conservative loss was Iain Macleod's "The Tory Leadership" article, in which the former cabinet minister claimed that an Etonian "magic circle" conspiracy had led to him becoming prime minister. British Ambassador to the United States David Ormsby-Gore wrote to Home that "Almost anything could have tipped the balance. Khrushchev's removal from office twelve hours earlier, China’s nuclear explosion thirty-six hours earlier or just Rab [Butler] keeping his mouth shut for once." David Butler and Donald E. Stokes's influential 1969 British Election Study report Political Change in Britain attributed the Labour victory to Wilson's greater popularity than Home and the party's appeal to younger voters. After British elections in the 1980s and the 1990s challenged many of the assumptions of Butler and Stokes's model, the BES issued a second 2001 report by political scientists from the University of Texas and the University of Essex emphasizing the role of valence politics over public perception of party performance.

Working-class voters also selected Labour in greater numbers than in the previous election, due in part to the weakening of the post-war boom which had popularized the Conservatives in the 1950s, although the Conservatives attracted a greater number of female voters than before. The Conservatives tried to attract working-class voters by improving the party's relationships with trade unions through the Conservative Trade Union Councils at the party level and the new National Economic Development Council at the governmental level; however, their outreach was weakened by the Rookes v Barnard decision allowing employers to collect punitive damages from strike actions and Douglas-Home's tough approach to industrial relations. As a result, trade unions heavily supported Labour in the election and encouraged working-class support of the party. As much as 85 per cent of Labour's election spending consisted of funds raised by trade unions.

Aggregate data analyses of the results demonstrate higher turnout in constituencies dominated by the professional–managerial class, agricultural workers, council tenants, voters without automobiles, and the elderly. Many salaried professionals who ordinarily supported for the Conservatives voted for Labour because of high inflation. On the other hand, Labour's poorer performance in central and southern England and loss of five seats in that area indicated an increasing white working-class backlash against nonwhite immigration. The most notable example of this was the contest in Smethwick, in which an explicitly racist campaign by Conservative candidate Peter Griffiths stoking anxieties around deindustrialisation and a shortage of council housing by targeting immigrants unseated Shadow Foreign Secretary Patrick Gordon Walker.

== Results ==
=== Summary of seats returned ===
| Party | Leader | MPs | | Aggregate votes | |
| Party | Leader | | Of total | | Of total |
|---|---|---|---|---|---|
| Labour Party | Harold Wilson | 317 (Note: Includes 19 Co-operative Party MP, as part of the Labour-Co-op alliance.) | 50.3% | 12,205,808 | 44.1% |
| Conservative and Unionist Party | Alec Douglas-Home | 304 | 48.3% | 12,002,642 | 43.4% |
| Conservative Party (Note: Conservative and Unionist Party results for England and Wales.) | Alec Douglas-Home | 262 | 41.6% | 10,292,974 | 38.1% |
| Unionist Party | John George | 24 | 3.8% | 981,641 | 3.6% |
| Ulster Unionist Party | Terence O'Neill | 12 | 1.9% | 401,897 | 1.5% |
| National Liberal Party | Colin Thornton-Kemsley | 6 | 1.0% | 326,130 | 1.2% |
| Liberal Party | Jo Grimond | 9 | 1.4% | 3,099,283 | 11.2% |

=== Full results ===

Results of the October 1964 general election to the House of Commons of the United Kingdom
| Party | Leader | Candidates | MPs | | | | | Aggregate votes | | |
| Party | Leader | Candidates | Total | Gains | Losses | Net | Of total (%) | Total | Of total (%) | Change (%) |
|---|---|---|---|---|---|---|---|---|---|---|
| Labour | Harold; Wilson | 628 (Note: Includes 27 Co-operative Party candidates, as part of the Labour-Co-op alliance.) | 317 (Note: Includes 19 Co-operative Party MPs, as part of the Labour-Co-op alliance.) | 63 | 4 | ▲59 (Note: Includes ▲3 Co-operative Party MPs, as part of the Labour-Co-op alliance.) | 50.3 (Note: Includes 3.0% for the Co-operative Party, as part of the Labour-Co-op alliance.) | 12,205,808 (Note: Includes 566,220 for the Co-operative Party, as part of the Labour-Co-op alliance.) | 44.1 (Note: Includes 2.0% for the Co-operative Party, as part of the Labour-Co-op alliance.) | ▲0.3 (Note: Includes ▼0.4% for the Co-operative Party, as part of the Labour-Co-op alliance.) |
| Conservative (Total) | Alec; Douglas-Home | 630 | 304 | 14 | 75 | ▼61 | 48.3 | 12,002,642 | 43.4 | ▼6.0 |
| Conservative (Note: Figure includes the Unionist Party and the Ulster Unionist Party under their nation affiliations with the Conservative Party.) | Alec; Douglas-Home | 611 | 298 | 14 | 61 | ▼47 | 47.3 | 11,676,512 | 42.2 | ▼4.4 |
| National Liberal | Colin; Thornton-Kemsley | 19 | 6 | 0 | 14 | ▼14 | 1.0 | 326,130 | 1.2 | ▼1.5 |
| Liberal | Jo; Grimond | 365 | 9 | 5 | 2 | ▲3 | 1.4 | 3,099,283 | 11.2 | ▲5.3 |
| Independent; Republican | —N/a | 12 | 0 | Did not stand in 1959 | | | — | 101,628 | 0.4 | —N/a |
| Plaid Cymru | Gwynfor; Evans | 23 | 0 | 0 | 0 | Steady | — | 69,507 | 0.3 | Steady |
| SNP | Arthur; Donaldson | 15 | 0 | 0 | 0 | Steady | — | 64,044 | 0.2 | ▲0.1 |
| Communist | John; Gollan | 36 | 0 | 0 | 0 | Steady | — | 46,442 | 0.2 | ▲0.1 |
| Republican; Labour | Gerry; Fitt | 1 (Note: Leader Gerry Fitt stood in Belfast West.) | 0 | New | | | — | 14,678 | 0.1 | New |
| Independent; Liberal | —N/a | 3 | 0 | 0 | 0 | Steady | — | 14,011 | 0.1 | ▲0.1 |
| Independent | —N/a | 13 | 0 | 0 | 0 | Steady | — | 12,495 | 0.1 | ▲0.1 |
| Independent; Conservative | —N/a | 4 | 0 | 0 | 0 | Steady | — | 3,664 | 0.0 | Steady |
| British; National | John; Bean | 1 (Note: Leader John Bean stood in Southall.) | 0 | New | | | — | 3,410 | 0.0 | New |
| Anti-Common Market League | John Paul & Michael Shay | 2 | 0 | New | | | — | 3,083 | 0.0 | New |
| Independent Unionist | —N/a | 1 (Note: Candidate John M. Young stood in Caithness and Sutherland.) | 1 | 0 | 1 | ▼1 (Note: Caithness and Sutherland.) | — | 2,795 | 0.0 | —N/a |
| New Liberal | Alan; Lomas | 1 (Note: Leader Alan Ernest Lomas stood in Islington East.) | 0 | New | | | — | 2,053 | 0.0 | New |
| Nuclear Disarmament | Pat; Arrowsmith | 2 | 0 | New | | | — | 1,534 | 0.0 | New |
| Anti- Vivisection | —N/a | 1 (Note: Candidate Gabriel Barlow stood in Glasgow Maryhill.) | 0 | New | | | — | 1,231 | 0.0 | New |
| Fellowship | Ronald; Mallone | 1 (Note: General Secretary of the Fellowship Party Ronald Mallone stood in Woolwich West.) | 1 | 0 | 0 | Steady | — | 1,112 | 0.0 | Steady |
| Empire Loyalists | Arthur; Chesterton | 3 | 0 | New | | | — | 1,046 | 0.0 | New |
| Patriotic Party | Richard; Hilton | 2 | 0 | New | | | — | 539 | 0.0 | New |
| Communist Anti-Revisionist | Michael; McCreery | 1 (Note: Candidate Michael Claude Watkins Baker stood in Huyton.) | 0 | New | | | — | 899 | 0.0 | New |
| Christian; Progressive | —N/a | 1 (Note: Candidate James Lee stood in Horsham.) | 0 | New | | | — | 865 | 0.0 | New |
| Ratepayer (Romford) | —N/a | 1 (Note: Candidate Edgar Bates stood in Romford.) | 0 | New | | | — | 811 | 0.0 | New |
| Taxpayers' Coalition Party | John; Dayton | 1 (Note: Candidate P. Michael Kingston stood in Bristol West.) | 0 | New | | | — | 709 | 0.0 | New |
| Farmers' Candidate | —N/a | 1 (Note: Candidate James Hayward stood in Banbury.) | 0 | New | | | — | 534 | 0.0 | New |
| Independent Labour | —N/a | 1 (Note: Candidate John Stevenson Thomson stood in Greenock.) | 0 | Did not stand in 1959 | | | — | 458 | 0.0 | —N/a |
| National Democratic | David; Brown | 1 (Note: Candidate David Brown stood in Ipswich.) | 0 | Did not stand in 1959 | | | — | 349 | 0.0 | —N/a |
| Socialist (GB) | Collective; Leadership | 2 | 0 | 0 | 0 | Steady | — | 322 | 0.0 | Steady |
| World; Government | Gilbert; Young | 1 (Note: Candidate Gilbert Young stood in Bath.) | 0 | New | | | — | 318 | 0.0 | New |
| British and Commonwealth | Miles; Blair | 1 (Note: Candidate Miles Blair stood in Kidderminster.) | 0 | New | | | — | 310 | 0.0 | New |
| Social; Credit | Archie; Frost | 1 (Note: Candidate Archie S. Frost stood in Rugby.) | 0 | New | | | — | 304 | 0.0 | New |
| Christian socialist | —N/a | 1 (Note: Candidate Frederick Palmer stood in Dulwich.) | 0 | New | | | — | 310 | 0.0 | New |
| Blank and invalid votes | | | | | | | | 41,073 | — | — |
| Total | | 1,757 | 630 | | | 0 | 100.0 | 27,657,148 (Note: All valid votes excluding spoiled votes.) | 100.0 | 0.0 |
| Registered voters, and turnout | | | | | | | | 35,894,054 | 77.1 | ▼1.7 |

=== Votes summary ===
Popular vote
| Labour | 44.13% |
| Conservative | 43.41% |
| Liberal | 11.21% |
| Others | 1.25% |

=== Seats summary ===
Parliamentary seats
| Labour | 50.32% |
| Conservative | 48.25% |
| Liberal | 1.43% |

== Transfers of seats ==
- All comparisons are with the 1959 election.
  - In some cases the change is due to the MP defecting to the gaining party. Such circumstances are marked with a *.
  - In other circumstances the change is due to the seat having been won by the gaining party in a by-election in the intervening years, and then retained in 1964. Such circumstances are marked with a †.

| From | To | No. | Seats |
|---|---|---|---|
| Labour | Labour (HOLD) | | Aberavon, Aberdare, Aberdeen North, Abertillery, Accrington, Anglesey, Ashton-under-Lyne, Ayrshire Central, Ayrshire South, Barking, Barrow-in-Furness, Bedwellty, Belper, Birkenhead, Bishop Auckland, Blackburn, Blaydon, Bolsover, Bootle, Bosworth, Bothwell, Brecon and Radnor, Brigg, Bristol Central, Bristol South, Bristol South East^{4}, Burnley, Caernarfon, Caerphilly, Cardiff South East, Cardiff West, Carmarthen, Chester-le-Street, Chesterfield, Chorley, Coatbridge and Airdrie, Consett, Crewe, Dagenham, Dartford, Derby North, Derby South, Derbyshire North East, Dudley, Dunbartonshire East, Dunbartonshire West, Dundee East, Dundee West, Dunfermline Burghs, Durham, Durham North West, Easington, East Ham N, East Ham S, Ebbw Vale, Eccles, Edinburgh Central, Edinburgh East, Edinburgh Leith, Erith and Crayford, Falmouth and Camborne, Farnworth, Faversham, Fife West, Flintshire East, Gateshead East, Gateshead West, Glasgow Bridgeton, Glasgow Central, Glasgow Craigton, Glasgow Gorbals, Glasgow Govan, Glasgow Maryhill, Glasgow Provan, Glasgow Scotstoun, Glasgow Shettleston, Glasgow Springburn, Gloucester, Gloucestershire West, Goole, Gower, Greenock, Grimsby, Hamilton, Houghton-le-Spring, Huyton, Ilkeston, Ince, Jarrow, Kilmarnock, Kingston upon Hull East, Kingston upon Hull West, Kirkcaldy Burghs, Lanark, Lanarkshire North, Leicester NE, Leicester NW, Leicester SW, Leigh, Leyton, Lincoln, Liverpool Edge Hill, Liverpool Exchange, Liverpool Scotland, Llanelli, Loughborough, Manchester Ardwick, Manchester Cheetham, Manchester Exchange, Manchester Gorton, Manchester Openshaw, Merionethshire, Merthyr Tydfil, Midlothian, Motherwell, Neath, Nelson and Colne, Newport (Monmouthshire), Newton, Ogmore, Oldbury and Halesowen, Oldham East, Oldham West, Paisley, Pembrokeshire, Pontypool, Pontypridd, Rhondda East, Rhondda West, Rochdale, Romford, Rossendale, Rowley Regis and Tipton, St Helens, Salford East, Salford West, Sedgefield, South Shields, Southampton Itchen, Stalybridge and Hyde, Stirling and Falkirk, Stirlingshire East and Clackmannan, Stirlingshire West, Stockton-on-Tees, Sunderland North, Swansea East, Thurrock, Walthamstow W, Warrington, West Ham North, West Ham South, West Lothian, Western Isles, Westhoughton, Whitehaven, Widnes, Wigan, Workington, Wrexham |
| Labour | National Liberal | | |
| Labour | Conservative | | Eton and Slough, Smethwick |
| Liberal | Labour | | Bolton West, Huddersfield West |
| Liberal | Liberal (HOLD) | | Cardiganshire, Devon North, Montgomeryshire, Orkney and Shetland |
| National Liberal | Labour | | Luton†, Renfrewshire West, Bradford North |
| National Liberal | Liberal | | Ross and Cromarty |
| National Liberal | National Liberal (HOLD) | | Bristol North East, Harwich, Holland with Boston, Huntingdonshire, St Ives, Bradford West |
| National Liberal | Conservative | | Angus North and Mearns, Angus South, Bedfordshire South*, Dumfries†, Fife East†, Plymouth Devonport*, Denbigh*, Sheffield Hallam*, Sheffield Heeley*, Norfolk Central*† (Note: The National Liberal that had won the 1962 Central Norfolk by-election then ran as a Conservative.) |
| Conservative | Labour | | Bolton East, Buckingham, Bury and Radcliffe, Carlisle, Derbyshire South East, Dover, Epping, Glasgow Kelvingrove, Glasgow Pollok, Glasgow Woodside†, Gravesend, The Hartlepools, Heywood and Royton, Hitchin, Kingston upon Hull North, Liverpool Kirkdale, Liverpool Toxteth, Liverpool Walton, Liverpool West Derby, Manchester Blackley, Manchester Wythenshawe, Preston South, Rochester and Chatham, Rutherglen†, Stockport North, Stockport South, Sunderland South, Swansea West, Watford |
| Conservative | Liberal | | Bodmin, Inverness, Orpington† |
| Conservative | Conservative (HOLD) | | Aberdeen South, Aberdeenshire East, Aberdeenshire West, Abingdon, Aldershot, Altrincham and Sale, Argyll, Ashford, Aylesbury, Ayr, Ayrshire North and Bute, Banff, Barnet, Barry, Basingstoke, Bebington, Beckenham, Bedford, Bedfordshire Mid, Berwick and East Lothian, Bexley, Billericay, Blackpool North, Blackpool South, Bournemouth East & Christchurch, Bournemouth West, Bridlington, Bristol North West, Bristol West, Bromley, Bromsgrove, Buckinghamshire South, Cambridge, Cambridgeshire, Canterbury, Cardiff North, Cheadle, Chelmsford, Cheltenham, Chester, Chigwell, Chislehurst, Cirencester and Tewkesbury, Clitheroe, Colchester, Conway, Cornwall North, Crosby, Darlington, Darwen, West Derbyshire, Dorset North, Dorset South^{3}, Dorset West, Eastleigh, Edinburgh North, Edinburgh Pentlands, Edinburgh South, Edinburgh West, Essex SE, Exeter, Flintshire West, Folkestone and Hythe, Fylde North, Fylde South, Gainsborough, Galloway, Gillingham, Glasgow Cathcart, Glasgow Hillhead, Gloucestershire South, Gosport and Fareham, Grantham, Haltemprice, Harborough, Hemel Hempstead, Hereford, Hertford, Hertfordshire E, Hertfordshire SW, High Peak, Honiton, Horncastle, Hornchurch, Howden, Ilford North, Ilford South, Isle of Ely, Isle of Thanet, Isle of Wight, Kidderminster, Kinross and West Perthshire, Knutsford, Lancaster, Leicester South East, Leominster, Liverpool Garston, Liverpool Wavertree, Louth, Macclesfield, Maidstone, Maldon, Manchester Moss Side, Manchester Withington, Melton, Middleton and Prestwich, Monmouth, Moray and Nairn, Morecambe and Lonsdale, Nantwich, New Forest, Newbury, Northwich, Ormskirk, Plymouth Sutton, Penrith and the Border, Perth and East Perthshire, Petersfield, Poole, Portsmouth Langstone, Portsmouth South, Portsmouth West, Preston North, Reading, Renfrewshire East, Roxburgh, Selkirk and Peebles, Runcorn, Rutland and Stamford, Saffron Walden, St Albans, Sevenoaks, Southampton Test, Southend East, Southend West, Southport, Stretford, Stroud, Tavistock, Tiverton, Tonbridge, Torquay, Torrington, Totnes, Truro, Wallasey, Walthamstow East, Wanstead and Woodford, Westmorland, Winchester, Windsor, Wirral, Wokingham, Worcester, Worcestershire South, Wycombe |
| Conservative | Ind. Conservative | | |
| Ind. Conservative | Liberal | | Caithness and Sutherland |
| UUP | UUP | | North Antrim, South Antrim, Armagh, Belfast East, Belfast North, Belfast South, Belfast West, Down North, Down South, Fermanagh and South Tyrone, Londonderry, Mid Ulster |
| Conservative | Speaker | | Cities of London and Westminster |

- ^{3} Seat gained by Labour in a by-election but regained by the Conservatives in 1964.
- ^{4} Seat gained by Conservatives in a 1961 by-election but regained by Labour in another 1963 by-election.

== Incumbents defeated ==
| Party | Name | Constituency | Office held whilst in power | Year elected | Defeated by | Party |
|---|---|---|---|---|---|---|
| Conservative Party | Philip Holland | Acton | | 1959 | Bernard Floud | Labour Party |
| Conservative Party | William Compton Carr | Barons Court | | 1959 | Ivor Richard | Labour Party |
| Conservative Party | Ernest Partridge | Battersea South | | 1951 | Ernie Perry | Labour Party |
| Conservative Party | John Hollingworth | Birmingham All Saints | | 1959 | Brian Walden | Labour Party |
| Conservative Party | Leslie Seymour | Birmingham Sparkbrook | | 1959 | Roy Hattersley | Labour Party |
| Conservative Party | Leonard Cleaver | Birmingham Yardley | | 1959 | Ioan Evans | Labour Party |
| Conservative Party | Douglas Marshall | Bodmin | | 1945 | Peter Bessell | Liberal Party |
| Conservative Party | William Taylor | Bradford North | | 1950 | Ben Ford | Labour Party |
| Conservative Party | David James | Brighton Kemptown | | 1959 | Dennis Hobden | Labour Party |
| Conservative Party | John Bidgood | Bury and Radcliffe | | 1955 | David Ensor | Labour Party |
| Conservative Party | Donald Johnson | Carlisle | | 1955 | Ronald Lewis | Labour Party |
| Conservative Party | Sir Alan Glyn | Clapham | | 1959 | Margaret McKay | Labour Party |
| Conservative Party | Wilf Proudfoot | Cleveland | | 1959 | James Tinn | Labour Party |
| Conservative Party | Philip Hocking | Coventry South | | 1959 | Bill Wilson | Labour Party |
| Conservative Party | Anthony Bourne-Arton | Darlington | | 1959 | Ted Fletcher | Labour Party |
| Conservative Party | Anthony Barber | Doncaster | Minister of Health | 1951 | Harold Walker | Labour Party |
| Conservative Party | John Arbuthnot | Dover | | 1950 | David Ennals | Labour Party |
| Conservative Party | Graeme Finlay | Epping | | 1951 | Stan Newens | Labour Party |
| Conservative Party | Frank Lilley | Glasgow Kelvingrove | | 1959 | Maurice Miller | Labour Party |
| Conservative Party | Peter Kirk | Gravesend | Under-Secretary of State for War | 1955 | Albert Murray | Labour Party |
| Conservative Party | Maurice Macmillan | Halifax | | 1955 | Shirley Summerskill | Labour Party |
| Conservative Party | Tony Leavey | Heywood and Royton | | 1955 | Joel Barnett | Labour Party |
| Conservative Party | Martin Maddan | Hitchin | | 1955 | Shirley Williams | Labour Party |
| Conservative Party | Geoffrey Johnson-Smith | Holborn and St Pancras South | | 1959 | Lena Jeger | Labour Party |
| Conservative Party | Neil McLean | Inverness | | 1954 | Russell Johnston | Liberal Party |
| Conservative Party | Marcus Worsley | Keighley | | 1959 | John Binns | Labour Party |
| Conservative Party | Denys Bullard | King's Lynn | | 1959 | Derek Page | Labour Party |
| Conservative Party | Michael Coulson | Kingston upon Hull North | Parliamentary private secretary | 1959 | Henry Solomons | Labour Party |
| Conservative Party | Norman Pannell | Liverpool Kirkdale | | 1955 | James Dunn | Labour Party |
| Conservative Party | Reginald Bevins | Liverpool Toxteth | Postmaster General | 1950 | Richard Crawshaw | Labour Party |
| Conservative Party | Kenneth Thompson | Liverpool Walton | | 1950 | Eric Heffer | Labour Party |
| Conservative Party | John Woollam | Liverpool West Derby | | 1954 by-election | Eric Ogden | Labour Party |
| Conservative Party | Eric Johnson | Manchester Blackley | | 1951 | Paul Rose | Labour Party |
| Conservative Party | Eveline Hill | Manchester Wythenshawe | | 1950 | Alf Morris | Labour Party |
| Conservative Party | Gordon Matthews | Meriden | Parliamentary private secretary | 1959 | Christopher Rowland | Labour Party |
| Conservative Party | Fergus Montgomery | Newcastle upon Tyne East | Parliamentary private secretary | 1959 | Geoffrey Rhodes | Labour Party |
| Conservative Party | Geoffrey Rippon | Norwich South | | 1955 | Christopher Norwood | Labour Party |
| Conservative Party | John Cordeaux | Nottingham Central | | 1955 | Jack Dunnett | Labour Party |
| Conservative Party | Peter Tapsell | Nottingham West | | 1959 | Michael English | Labour Party |
| Conservative Party | Alan Green | Preston South | Financial Secretary to the Treasury | 1955 | Peter Mahon | Labour Party |
| Conservative Party | Hugh Linstead | Putney | | 1942 by-election | Hugh Jenkins | Labour Party |
| Conservative Party | Julian Critchley | Rochester and Chatham | | 1959 | Anne Kerr | Labour Party |
| Conservative Party | Norman Hulbert | Stockport North | | 1950 | Arnold Gregory | Labour Party |
| Conservative Party | Harold Steward | Stockport South | | 1955 by-election | Maurice Orbach | Labour Party |
| Conservative Party | Paul Williams | Sunderland South | | 1953 by-election | Gordon Bagier | Labour Party |
| Conservative Party | Hugh Rees | Swansea West | Parliamentary private secretary | 1959 | Alan Williams | Labour Party |
| Conservative Party | John Kerans | The Hartlepools | | 1959 | Ted Leadbitter | Labour Party |
| Conservative Party | Michael Hughes-Young | Wandsworth Central | Treasurer of the Household | 1955 | David Kerr | Labour Party |
| Conservative Party | Frederick Farey-Jones | Watford | | 1955 | Raphael Tuck | Labour Party |
| Conservative Party | Michael Hamilton | Wellingborough | Lord Commissioner of the Treasury | 1959 | Harry Howarth | Labour Party |
| Conservative Party | Trevor Skeet | Willesden East | | 1959 | Reg Freeson | Labour Party |
| Conservative Party | Colin Turner | Woolwich West | | 1959 | Bill Hamling | Labour Party |
| Labour Party | Charles Howell | Birmingham Perry Barr | | 1955 | Wyndham Davies | Conservative Party |
| Labour Party | Fenner Brockway | Eton and Slough | | 1950 | Anthony Meyer | Conservative Party |
| Labour Party | Albert Hilton | South West Norfolk | | 1959 by-election | Paul Hawkins | Conservative Party |
| Labour Party | Patrick Gordon Walker | Smethwick | Shadow Foreign Secretary | 1945 by-election | Peter Griffiths | Conservative Party |
| Liberal Party | Arthur Holt | Bolton West | | 1951 | Gordon Oakes | Labour Party |
| Liberal Party | Donald Wade | Huddersfield West | Deputy Leader of the Liberal Party | 1950 | Ken Lomas | Labour Party |
| Independent Liberal | Sir John MacLeod | Ross and Cromarty | | 1950 | Alasdair Mackenzie | Liberal Party |

== Televised results programmes ==
Both BBC Television and ITV provided live televised coverage of the results and provided commentary.

== See also ==
- List of MPs elected in the 1964 United Kingdom general election
- 1964 United Kingdom general election in England
- 1964 United Kingdom general election in Scotland
- 1964 United Kingdom general election in Wales
- 1964 United Kingdom general election in Northern Ireland
- Smethwick in the 1964 general election
