= 1963 Labour Party leadership election (UK) =

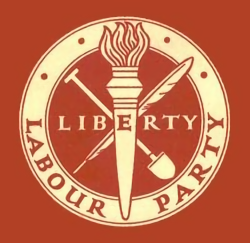
- 7–14 February 1963
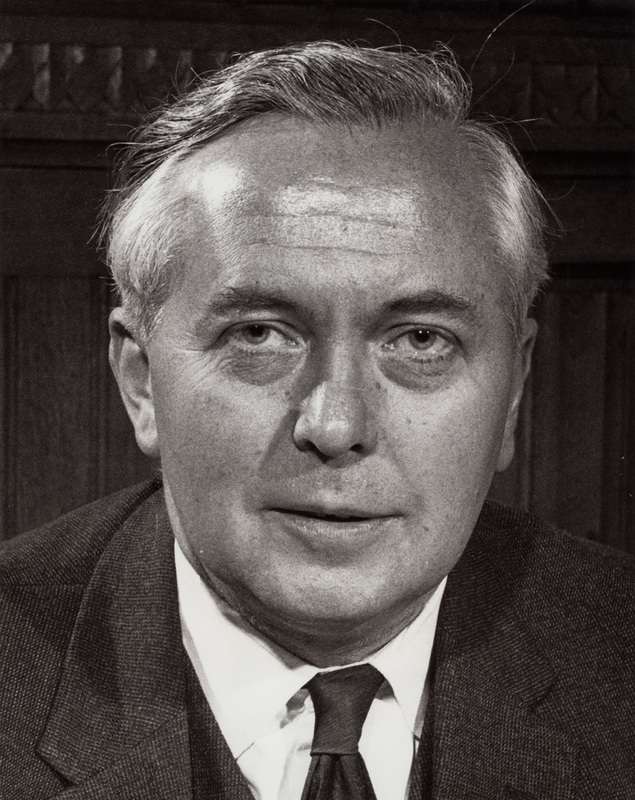

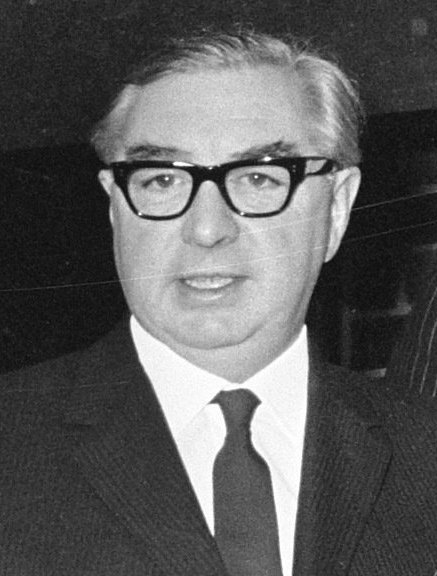

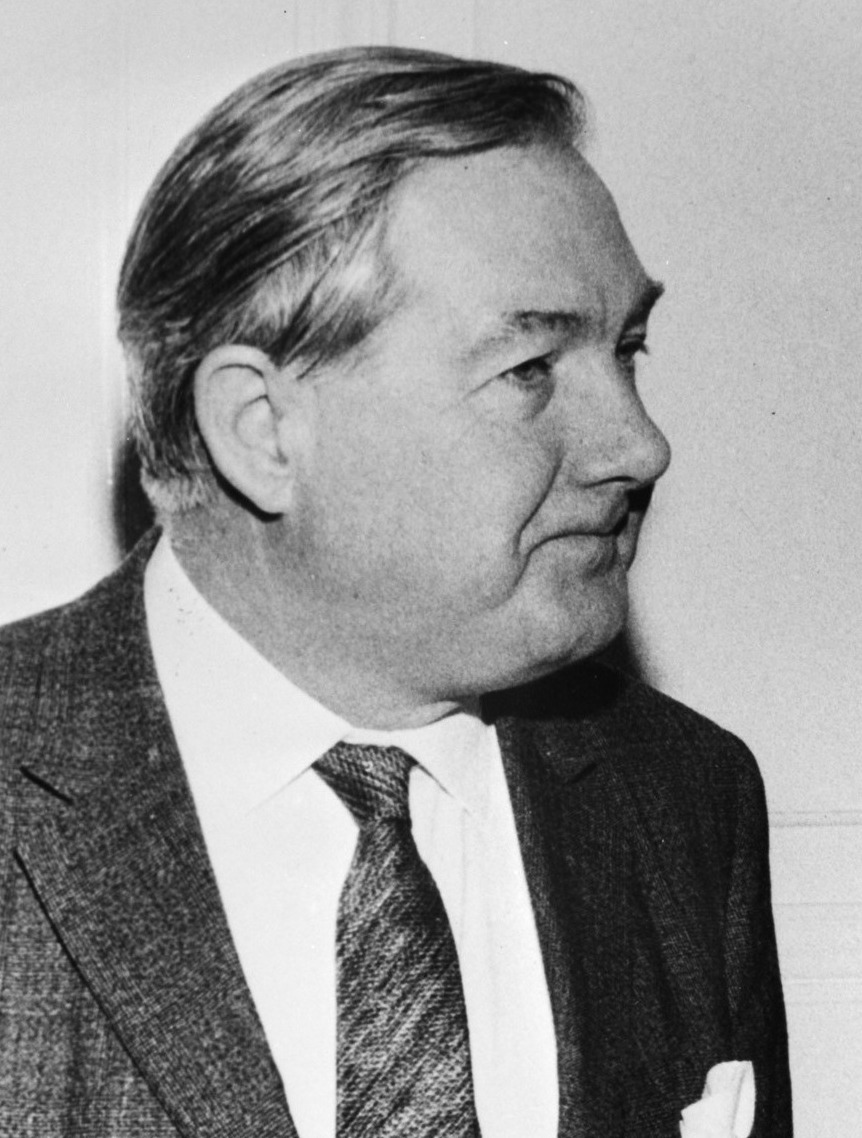
Candidate	Harold Wilson	George Brown	James Callaghan
First ballot	115 (47.1%)	88 (36.1%)	41 (16.8%)
Second ballot	144 (58.3%)	103 (41.7%)	Eliminated
Leader before election
George Brown (interim)
Hugh Gaitskell
Elected Leader
Harold Wilson

The 1963 Labour Party leadership election was held following the death of Hugh Gaitskell, party leader since 1955. He died on 18 January 1963 and was succeeded (on a temporary basis) by deputy leader George Brown.

In 1963 the Labour leader was elected by the Parliamentary Labour Party (the members of the House of Commons in receipt of the Labour whip). To be elected the winning candidate required more than half the votes. If no candidate was elected in a ballot then the last placed candidate was eliminated and a new ballot held contested by the continuing candidates. This process, known as the exhaustive ballot, was repeated until a candidate was elected.

== Candidates ==
Three candidates were nominated.

1. Deputy Leader since 1960, George Brown (born 1914), was the MP for the Derbyshire constituency of Belper from 1945. Brown was popular in the party and stood for the continuation of Gaitskell's policies, but his colleagues were well aware of his propensity to drink excessive amounts of alcohol and behave in an erratic manner – to the extent that fellow right-wing MP Tony Crosland described the selection between him and Wilson as "[choosing] between a crook and a drunk." Brown had been a junior minister before 1951.
2. Shadow Chancellor of the Exchequer James Callaghan (born 1912), an Englishman who had represented part of the Welsh city of Cardiff since 1945, was a well regarded frontbencher. He sat for Cardiff South East in 1963. Callaghan had been a junior minister before 1951. Callaghan was also a Gaitskellite and his campaign split the vote of the right wing of the party. Despite being Shadow Chancellor since 1961, journalist and historian David McKie would later write that Callaghan was "very much the outsider" in the election. Callaghan would later become Leader, and Prime Minister, in the 1970s.
3. A former Bevanite, Shadow Foreign Secretary Harold Wilson (born 1916), had been the MP for the Lancashire constituencies of Ormskirk 1945-1950 and of Huyton since 1950. He had resigned from the cabinet of Clement Attlee in 1951 on the issue of prescription charges in the National Health Service. Wilson was the most credible alternative leader for the left, so he was persuaded to seek the party leadership in a 1960 challenge to Hugh Gaitskell. In that election he received 81 votes (35.37%). He was the only one of the three leadership candidates with cabinet experience.

== Potential candidates who declined to run ==
- Michael Stewart, Shadow Minister of Housing and Local Government, Member of Parliament for Fulham

== Ballots ==
An overall majority was required for election. The results of the ballots of Labour MPs were as follows:

First ballot: 7 February 1963
Candidate	Votes	%
Harold Wilson	115	47.1
George Brown	88	36.1
James Callaghan	41	16.8
Majority	27	11.1
Turnout	244	—
Second ballot required

As a result of the first ballot, Callaghan was eliminated. The Labour Party's rules required that the winner of the contest win more than half of the votes cast. As Wilson fell short of this the remaining two candidates would face each other in a second ballot, seven days later. However it was reported that Wilson was "likely" to prevail and that it was "doubtful" Brown could be able to win the backing of the 35 Callaghan voters he would need to emerge with a majority. Although Brown had defeated Wilson for the deputy leadership the previous year, the political correspondent of The Glasgow Herald reported that the two contests could not be compared, suggesting that Brown had partly won that contest as he was seen as a contrast to the "intellectual" leader Hugh Gaitskell. The same author suggested the fact that Wilson was an "intellectual" was an advantage to him in the contest to be leader. The author also opined that Callaghan supporters, who might assumed to be more likely to back Brown, would take into consideration that Wilson was " a more credible alternative Prime Minister".

Second ballot: 14 February 1963
Candidate	Votes	%
Harold Wilson	144	58.3
George Brown	103	41.7
Majority	41	16.6
Turnout	247	—
Harold Wilson elected

Although Brown had mustered 15 extra votes compared with the first ballot, Wilson increased his total by 29 to win a comfortable victory. According to the following day's The Glasgow Herald while Wilson's win by 41 votes was larger than had been anticipated earlier in the contest, it was not a surprise as "the tide began to run strongly in his [Wilson's] favour" after the previous week's vote ballot. The same article concluded that Labour MP's had picked Wilson as the "more credible alternative Prime Minister", arguing that his performances in the House of Commons and on television were more statesman like than those of "the bluff, outspoken Mr Brown".

At 46, Wilson was Labour's youngest leader until Tony Blair became leader in 1994 at the age of 41.

== Aftermath ==
Following his election, Harold Wilson pledged to preserve party unity and continue the policy direction established under Hugh Gaitskell, declaring that he had been chosen by the party as a whole rather than by any faction. Although Wilson secured a majority of 41 votes over George Brown, the distribution of support—particularly from the party centre—was seen as ensuring a broadly balanced mandate rather than a decisive shift to the left.

Attention immediately focused on whether Brown would remain deputy leader. Brown requested time to consider his position, though Wilson publicly expressed his desire that the existing leadership team continue intact.

Wilson’s immediate priorities included consolidating support among Gaitskellite MPs and preparing a manifesto for the forthcoming general election, with work already under way on economic planning and fiscal reform proposals, including consideration of a levy on accumulated wealth and measures designed to link incomes policy with greater economic equality.
