= 1966 United Kingdom general election in Wales =

- 31 March 1966

All 36 Welsh seats to the House of Commons
- Turnout: 79.0% (▼1.1 pp)
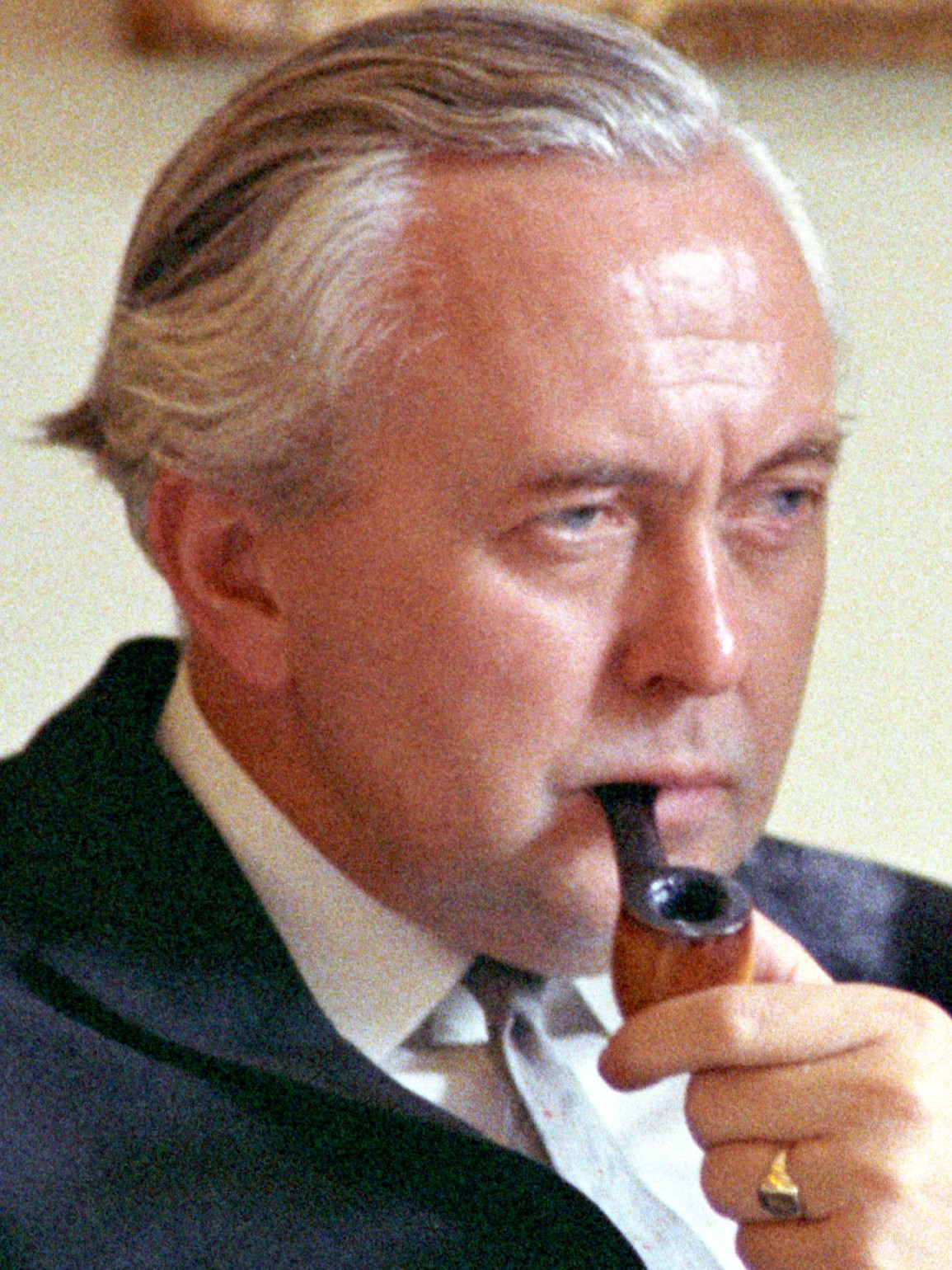

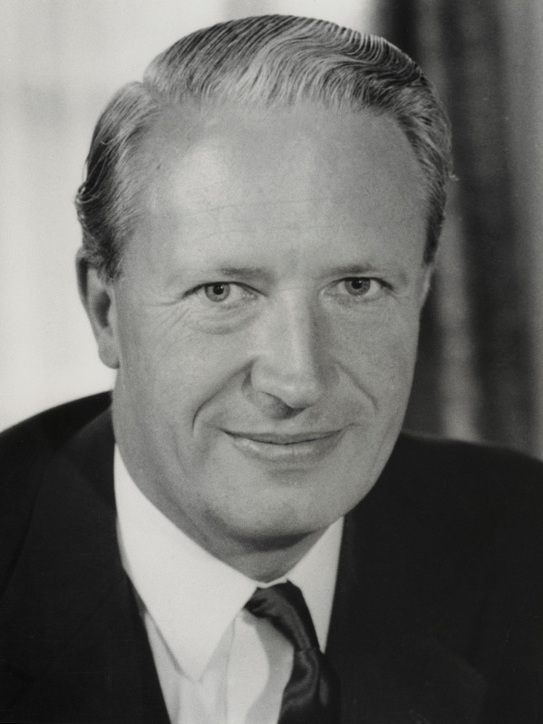

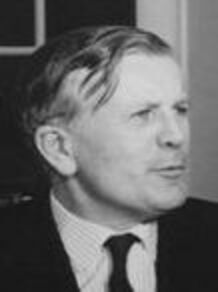
	First party	Second party	Third party
Leader	Harold Wilson	Edward Heath	Jo Grimond
Party	Labour	Conservative	Liberal
Leader since	14 February 1963	28 July 1965	5 November 1956
Leader's seat	Huyton	Bexley	Orkney and Shetland
Last election	28 seats, 57.8%	6 seats, 29.4%	2 seats, 7.3%
Seats won	32	3	1
Seat change	▲4	▼3	▼1
Popular vote	863,692	396,795	89,108
Percentage	60.7%	27.9%	6.3%
Swing	▲2.8 pp	▼1.5 pp	▼1.0 pp

On Thursday 31 March 1966, the 1966 United Kingdom general election was held in Wales, to elect all 630 members of the House of Commons, with 36 constituencies being in Wales.

The election took place only 17 months after the 1964 United Kingdom general election, with incumbent Prime Minister Harold Wilson deciding to call a snap election since his government had an unworkably small majority of only four MPs. Combined with results from across the UK, the result was a landslide victory for Wilson's Labour Party.

The election saw the Labour party win the most votes and seats in Wales, increasing its seats in Wales from 28 to 32. The Labour party won Cardiff North, Conwy and Monmouth from the Conservative Party. Labour also won Cardiganshire from the Liberal Party.

The Conservative Party retained, however, its seats of Barry, Denbigh and West Flintshire in Wales. The Liberal National Party, which had been in a constituency alliance with the Conservative Party, did not stand any candidates in Wales at this election.

The Liberal Party retained only one of its seats, being Montgomeryshire. The MP was Emlyn Hooson.

== Candidates ==
Below is a table summarising the candidates of the 1966 general election in Wales.

Affiliation	Candidates
Labour Party	36
Conservative and Unionist Party	36
Plaid Cymru	20
Liberal Party	11
Communist Party of Great Britain	8
Total	111

== Results ==
Below is a table summarising the results of the 1966 general election in Wales.

Party	Seats					Aggregate Votes		
Party	Total	Gains	Losses	Net	Of total (%)	Total	Of total (%)	Change (%)
Labour	32	4	0	▲4	88.9	863,692	60.7	▲2.8
Conservative	3	0	3	▼3	8.3	396,795	27.9	▼1.5
Liberal	1	0	1	▼1	2.8	89,108	6.3	▼1.0
Plaid Cymru	0	0	0	Steady	—	61,071	4.3	▼0.5
Communist	0	0	0	Steady	—	12,769	0.9	▲0.3
Blank and invalid votes						3,280	—	—
Total	36			0	100.0	1,423,435 (Note: All valid votes excluding spoiled votes.)	100.0	0.0
Registered voters, and turnout						1,800,925	79.0	▼1.1

Popular vote
Labour	60.7%
Conservative	27.9%
Liberal	6.3%
Plaid Cymru	4.3%
Communist	0.9%

Parliament seats
Labour	88.9%
Conservative	8.3%
Liberal	2.8%

== See also ==
- 1966 United Kingdom general election in England
- 1966 United Kingdom general election in Scotland
- 1966 United Kingdom general election in Northern Ireland
- List of MPs for constituencies in Wales (1966–1970)
