= 1966 United Kingdom general election in England =

- 31 March 1966

All 511 English seats in the House of Commons
- Turnout: 75.9% (▼1.1 pp)
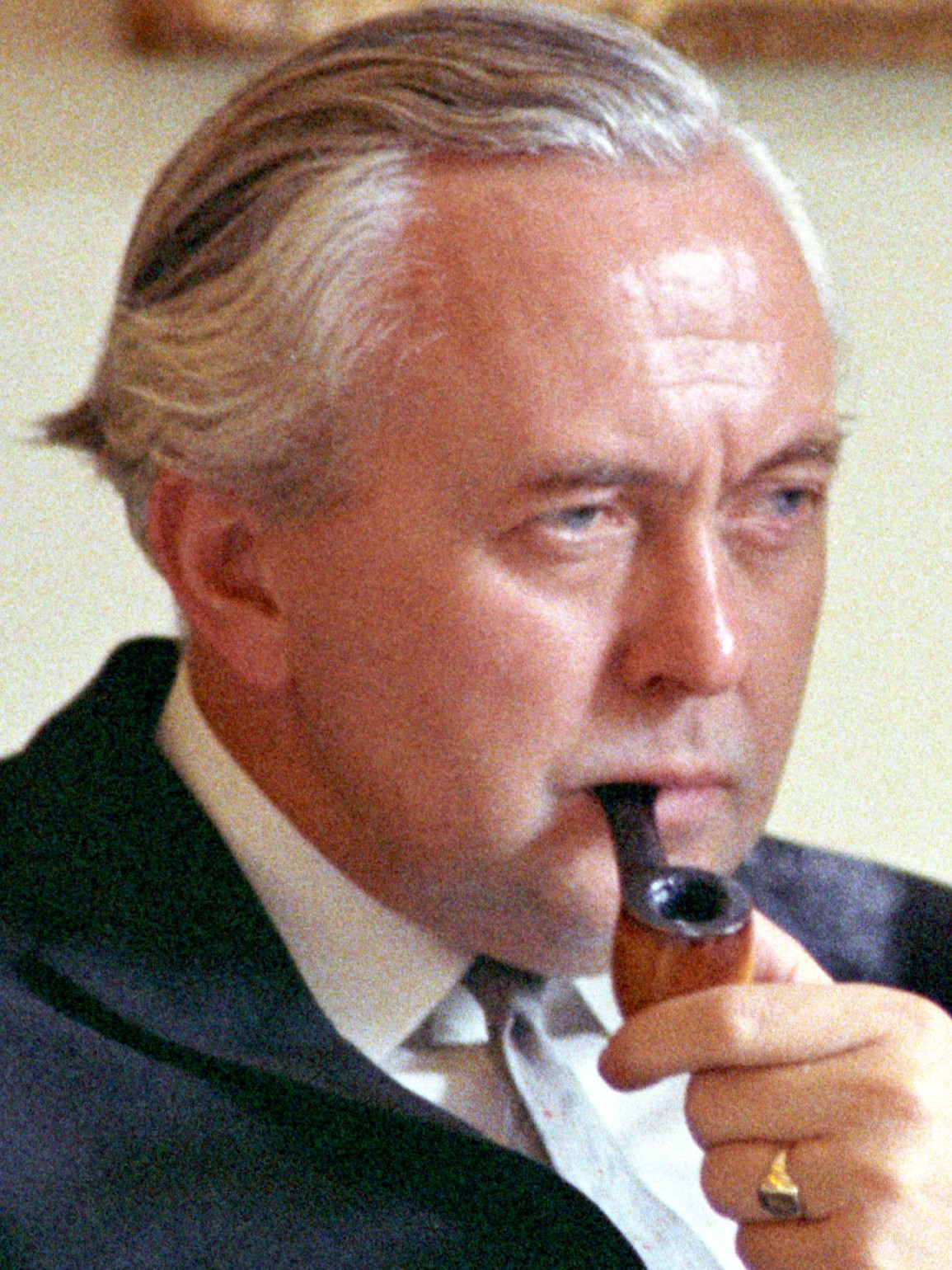

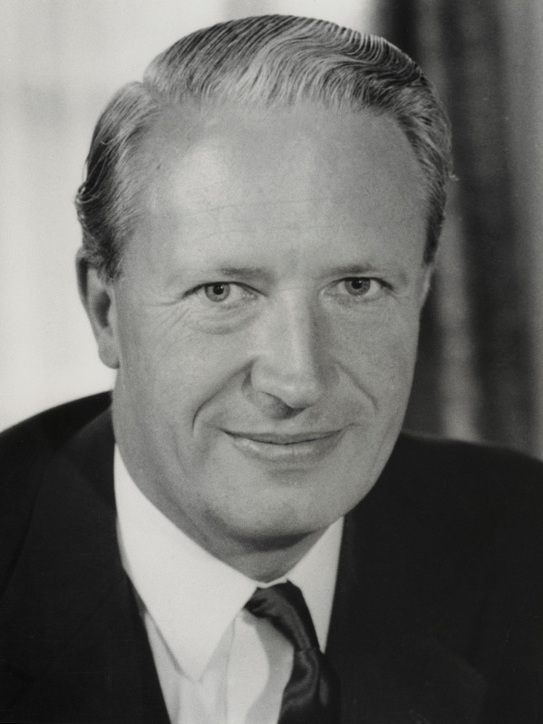

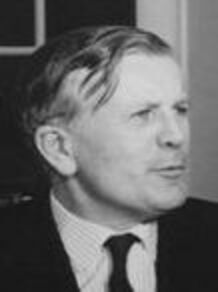
	First party	Second party	Third party
Leader	Harold Wilson	Edward Heath	Jo Grimond
Party	Labour	Conservative	Liberal
Leader since	14 February 1963	28 July 1965	5 November 1956
Leader's seat	Huyton	Bexley	Orkney and Shetland
Last election	246 seats, 43.5%	262 seats, 44.1%	3 seats, 12.1%
Seats won	286 (Note: Figure includes Speaker of the House of Commons Horace King in Southampton Itchen.)	219	6
Seat change	▲40	▼43	▲3
Popular vote	10,886,408	9,692,356	2,036,793
Percentage	48.0%	42.7%	9.0%
Swing	▲4.5 pp	▼1.4 pp	▼3.1 pp

On Thursday 31 March 1966, the 1966 United Kingdom general election was held in England, to elect all 630 members of the House of Commons, with 511 constituencies being in England.

The election took place only 17 months after the 1964 United Kingdom general election, with incumbent Prime Minister Harold Wilson deciding to call a snap election since his government had an unworkably small majority of only four MPs. Combined with results from across the UK, the result was a landslide victory for Wilson's Labour Party.

It was the last election at which the National Liberal Party stood candidates, before merging with its allies the Conservative Party in 1968.

== Candidates ==
Below is a table summarising the candidates of the 1964 general election in England.

Affiliation	Candidates
Labour Party	511
Conservative and Unionist Party	501
Liberal Party	273
Communist Party of Great Britain	34
Independent	13
National Liberal Party	9
Union Movement	4 (Note: The candidates that stood were Jeffrey Hamm in Birmingham Handsworth, Dennis Herbert Harmston in Islington South West, Frank T. Hamley in Manchester Ardwick and Leader Oswald Mosley in Shoreditch and Finsbury.)
Independent Conservative	3 (Note: The candidates that stood were Jane Ellis in Scarborough and Whitby, Christopher G Clayton-Wright in Stratford-on-Avon and Edward Moloney in Worthing.)
British National Party	3 (Note: The candidates that stood were Gerald Rowe in Deptford, R. Stanley in Smethwick and John Bean in Southall.)
Fellowship Party	1 (Note: Candidate Ronald Mallone stood in Woolwich West.)
Independent Labour	1 (Note: Candidate William Grant stood in Bootle.)
Independent Liberal	1 (Note: Candidate Elisa Sheriff stood in Fulham.)
New Liberal	1 (Note: Candidate Alan Ernest Lomas stood in Islington East.)
National Democratic Party	1 (Note: Candidate David R. M. Brown stood in Ipswich.)
Patriotic Party	1 (Note: Candidate Arthur Rossi Braybrooke stood in Fulham.)
Radical Alliance	1 (Note: Candidate Pat Arrowsmith stood in Fulham.)
Social Credit Party	1 (Note: Candidate Archie S. Frost stood in Rugby.)
Socialist Party of Great Britain	1 (Note: Candidate Harry Baldwin stood in Hampstead.)
Independent Labour Party	1 (Note: Candidate William Hanley stood in Leyton.)
Coalition Unity	1 (Note: Candidate Peter Lowe stood in Fylde North.)
National Teenage Party	1 (Note: Candidate David Edward Sutch stood in Huyton.)
Total	1,363

== Analysis ==
The incumbent Labour Party led by Prime Minister Harold Wilson won 286 seats in England, its second-highest tally of seats at the time. On the other hand, the Conservative Party, and its constituency allies the National Liberals, led by Edward Heath won only 216 seats, its lowest share of seats since the 1945 general election. It was also only the second time that the Labour Party had won more seats than the Conservatives in England since 1945.

The National Liberal Party only stood candidates in England at this election, with party losing all its seats in Scotland and Wales in 1964. Three of its MPs retained seats in England at this election, however it lost three of the six seats it had in the previous election. These were of Julian Ridsdale in Harwich, David Renton in Huntingdonshire and John Nott in St Ives. However, it lost the seat of Holland with Boston to its ally the Conservative Party, with National Liberal MP Herbert Butcher retiring from Parliament, and Conservative Richard Body winning the seat. It also lost Bristol North East and Bradford West to the Labour Party. The three remaining National Liberals resolved to formally merge with the Conservative Party after the election in 1968.

The Labour Party won an overall 40 seats from the Conservatives and National Liberal Party in England, though Patrick Duffy lost Colne Valley to Richard Wainwright of the Liberal Party. The Labour party would, however, regain the seat from the Liberal Party in the 1970 general election. The Liberal Party also won Cheadle and North Cornwall from the Conservative Party.

It was the only election between 1945 and 1997 general election in which the Labour Party won a majority of seats in England. Concurrently, this was the only election between 1945 and 1997 in which the Labour Party got a working majority in the House of Commons sufficient to last a full term in office (In 1950, 1964 and October 1974, the Labour majority was 5, 4 and 3 seats respectively).

== Results ==
Party	Seats					Aggregate votes		
Party	Total	Gains	Losses	Net	Of all (%)	Total	Of all (%)	Change (%)
Labour	286	41	1	▲40	55.8	10,886,408	48.0	▲4.5
Conservative (Total)	219	1	44	▼43	42.9	9,692,356	42.7	▼1.4
Conservative	216	1	41	▼40	50.1	9,542,577	42.1	▼1.0
National Liberal	3	0	3	▼3	1.2	149,779	0.7	▼0.2
Liberal	6	3	0	▲3	1.2	2,036,793	9.0	▼3.1
Communist	0	0	0	Steady	—	33,093	0.1	Steady
Independent	0	0	0	Steady	—	23,384	0.1	Steady
British National	0	0	0	Steady	—	5,182	0.0	Steady
Union Movement	0	Did not stand in 1964			—	4,075	0.0	—N/a
Ind. Conservative	0	0	0	Steady	—	3,206	0.0	Steady
Independent Labour	0	Did not stand in 1964			—	1,931	0.0	—N/a
New Liberal	0	0	0	Steady	—	1,127	0.0	Steady
Fellowship	0	0	0	Steady	—	906	0.0	Steady
Coalition Unity	0	New			—	826	0.0	New
National Democratic	0	0	0	Steady	—	769	0.0	Steady
Independent Liberal	0	0	0	Steady	—	716	0.0	▼0.1
National Teenage Party	0	New			—	585	0.0	New
Ind. Labour Party	0	0	0	Steady	—	441	0.0	Steady
Social Credit	0	0	0	Steady	—	397	0.0	Steady
Socialist (GB)	0	0	0	Steady	—	211	0.0	Steady
Radical Alliance (Note: Radical Alliance was successor name for the Independent Nuclear Disarmament Election Committee.)	0	0	0	Steady	—	163	0.0	Steady
Patriotic Party	0	0	0	Steady	—	163	0.0	Steady
Blank and invalid votes						39,108	—	—
Total	511			0	100.0	22,692,695 (Note: All valid votes excluding spoiled votes.)	100.0	0.0
Registered voters, and turnout						29,894,141	75.9	▼1.1

Popular vote
Labour	48.0%
Conservative	42.7%
Liberal	9.0%
Other	0.3%

Parliament seats
Labour	55.97%
Conservative	42.85%
Liberal	1.17%

== By region ==
Note: the following tables indicate the results according to the regions of England which were established in 1994, based on the county boundaries established in the 1974 local government reforms. These regions were not used at the time for the purposes of this election.

=== East Midlands ===
Party	Seats					Aggregate votes		
Party	Total	Gains	Losses	Net	Of all (%)	Total	Of all (%)	Change (%)
Labour	27	3	0	▲3	71.1	—N/a	52.7	▲4.5
Conservative	11	0	3	▼3	28.9	—N/a	41.2	▼1.0
Liberal	0	0	0	Steady	0.0	—N/a	6.1	▼3.4
Others	0	0	0	Steady	0.0	—N/a	0.1	Steady
Total	38					—N/a		

=== East of England ===
Party	Seats					Aggregate votes		
Party	Total	Gains	Losses	Net	Of all (%)	Total	Of all (%)	Change (%)
Conservative	26	0	5	▼5	63.4	—N/a	45.7	▼0.7
Labour	15	5	0	▲5	36.6	—N/a	44.9	▲4.1
Liberal	0	0	0	Steady	0.0	—N/a	9.3	▼3.4
Others	0	0	0	Steady	0.0	—N/a	0.1	Steady
Total	41					—N/a		

=== Greater London ===
Party	Seats					Aggregate votes		
Party	Total	Gains	Losses	Net	Of all (%)	Total	Of all (%)	Change (%)
Labour	65	12	0	▲12	63.7	—N/a	49.0	▲4.6
Conservative	36	0	12	▼12	35.3	—N/a	41.0	▼1.4
Liberal	1	0	0	Steady	1.0	—N/a	9.3	▼3.2
Others	0	0	0	Steady	0.0	—N/a	0.7	Steady
Total	102					—N/a		

=== North East England ===
Party	Seats					Aggregate votes		
Party	Total	Gains	Losses	Net	Of all (%)	Total	Of all (%)	Change (%)
Labour	27	0	0	Steady	87.1	—N/a	63.1	▲4.6
Conservative	4	0	0	Steady	12.9	—N/a	34.5	▼3.0
Liberal	0	0	0	Steady	0.0	—N/a	2.0	▼1.9
Others	0	0	0	Steady	0.0	—N/a	0.4	▲0.3
Total	31					—N/a		

=== North West England ===
Party	Seats					Aggregate votes		
Party	Total	Gains	Losses	Net	Of all (%)	Total	Of all (%)	Change (%)
Labour	57	5	0	▲5	68.7	—N/a	50.4	▲4.5
Conservative	25	0	6	▼6	30.1	—N/a	41.5	▼1.6
Liberal	1	1	0	▲1	1.2	—N/a	7.6	▼3.0
Others	0	0	0	Steady	0.0	—N/a	0.4	Steady
Total	83					—N/a		

=== South East England ===
Party	Seats					Aggregate votes		
Party	Total	Gains	Losses	Net	Of all (%)	Total	Of all (%)	Change (%)
Conservative	48	0	5	▼5	78.7	—N/a	49.0	▼1.4
Labour	13	5	0	▲5	21.3	—N/a	36.4	▲3.7
Liberal	0	0	0	Steady	0.0	—N/a	14.4	▼2.4
Others	0	0	0	Steady	0.0	—N/a	0.2	▲0.1
Total	61					—N/a		

=== South West England ===
Party	Seats					Aggregate votes		
Party	Total	Gains	Losses	Net	Of all (%)	Total	Of all (%)	Change (%)
Conservative	31	0	5	▼5	68.9	—N/a	45.6	▲0.2
Labour	11	5	0	▲4	24.4	—N/a	38.0	▲4.4
Liberal	3	1	0	▲1	6.7	—N/a	16.2	▼4.3
Others	0	0	0	Steady	0.0	—N/a	0.2	▼0.3
Total	45					—N/a		

=== West Midlands ===
Party	Seats					Aggregate votes		
Party	Total	Gains	Losses	Net	Of all (%)	Total	Of all (%)	Change (%)
Labour	32	4	0	▲4	59.3	—N/a	50.8	▲5.6
Conservative	22	0	4	▼4	40.7	—N/a	44.7	▼2.1
Liberal	0	0	0	Steady	0.0	—N/a	4.1	▼3.7
Others	0	0	0	Steady	0.0	—N/a	0.4	▲0.1
Total	54					—N/a		

=== Yorkshire and the Humber ===
Party	Seats					Aggregate votes		
Party	Total	Gains	Losses	Net	Of all (%)	Total	Of all (%)	Change (%)
Labour	39	3	1	▲2	69.6	—N/a	54.9	▲5.5
Conservative	16	0	3	▼3	28.6	—N/a	37.3	▼2.1
Liberal	1	1	0	▲1	1.8	—N/a	7.5	▼3.5
Others	0	0	0	Steady	0.0	—N/a	0.3	▲0.1
Total	56					—N/a		

== See also ==
- 1966 United Kingdom general election in Northern Ireland
- 1966 United Kingdom general election in Scotland
- 1966 United Kingdom general election in Wales
