= 1966 United Kingdom general election in Scotland =

- 31 March 1966

All 71 Scottish seats to the House of Commons
- Turnout: 76.0% (▼1.6 pp)
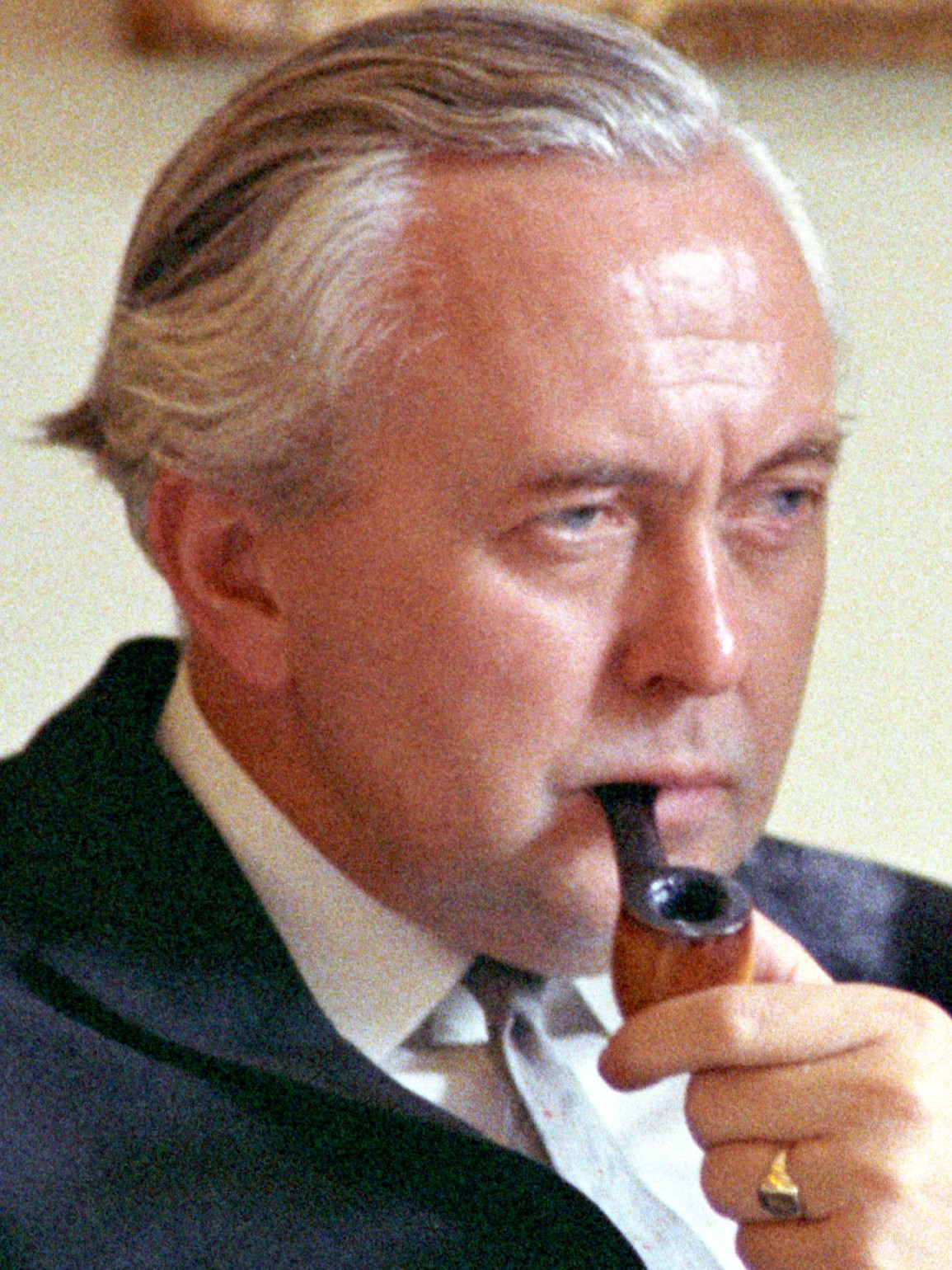

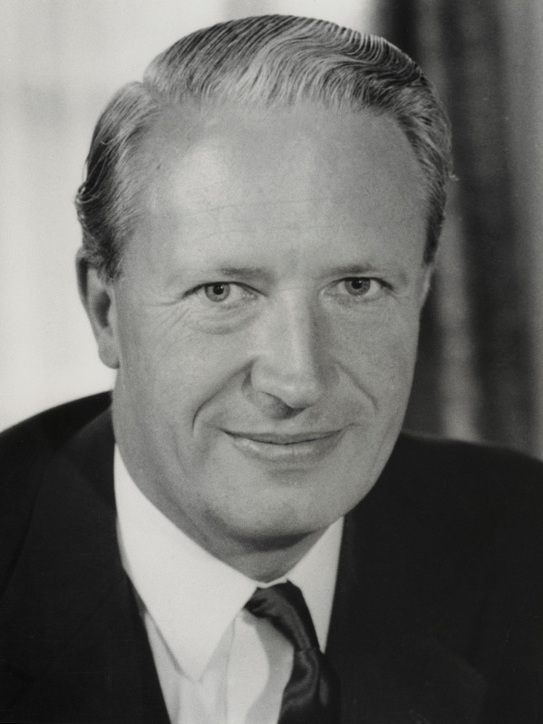

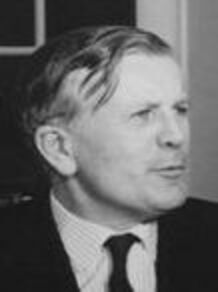
	First party	Second party	Third party
Leader	Harold Wilson	Edward Heath	Jo Grimond
Party	Labour	Conservative	Liberal
Alliance			Liberal
Leader since	14 February 1963	28 July 1965	5 November 1956
Leader's seat	Huyton	Bexley	Orkney and Shetland
Last election	43 seats, 48.7%	24 seats, 40.6%	4 seats, 7.6%
Seats won	46	20	5
Seat change	▲3	▼4	▲1
Popular vote	1,273,916	960,675	172,447
Percentage	49.9%	37.6%	6.8%
Swing	▲1.2 pp	▼3.0 pp	▼0.8 pp

On 31 March 1966, the 1966 United Kingdom general election was held in Scotland, to elect all 630 seats of the House of Commons, with 71 constituencies being in Scotland.

The election took place only 17 months after the 1964 United Kingdom general election, with incumbent Prime Minister Harold Wilson deciding to call a snap election since his government had an unworkably small majority of only four MPs. Combined with results from across the UK, the result was a landslide victory for Wilson's Labour Party.

The election was the first in which the Scottish Conservatives stood for election as an integral part of the Conservative Party, with the former Unionist Party (which had been aligned with, but separate from, the Conservatives), having merged into the Tories in April 1965.

== Candidates ==
Below is a table summarising the candidates of the 1966 general election in Scotland.

Affiliation	Candidates
Labour Party	71
Conservative and Unionist Party	71
Scottish Liberal Party	24
Scottish National Party	23
Communist Party of Great Britain	15
Independent	1 (Note: Candidate Joseph McDonagh stood in Glasgow Cathcart.)
Socialist Party of Great Britain	1 (Note: Candidate Robert Vallar stood in Glasgow Woodside.)
Total	206

== Analysis ==
The Conservative Party, in which the Unionist Party had merged in 1965, lost two seats to the Labour Party. These were Aberdeen South and Berwick and East Lothian. The Labour Party saw a slight increase in its vote share, with the Conservatives also dropping slightly. The Labour Party overall gained three seats in Scotland, with another gain from the Scottish Liberal Party. Conversely, the Conservatives lost a total of four seats in Scotland, also losing two to the Liberal Party.

Future Leader of the Liberal Party David Steel won the seat of Roxburgh, Selkirk and Peebles from the Conservative Party. Steel had initially entered Parliament at the 1965 Roxburgh, Selkirk and Peebles by-election. His retention of the seat was a gain for the Liberals in comparison to last election. The party also won West Aberdeenshire from the Conservatives. However, the party had lost Caithness and Sutherland to Labour candidate Robert Maclennan Maclennan would remain a Labour MP in the seat, until defecting to the Social Democratic Party in the 1980s, becoming its leader, as well as being a member of the successor party to the Liberals and Social Democrats, the Liberal Democrats.

== Results ==
Party	Seats					Aggregate votes		
Party	Total	Gains	Losses	Net	Of total (%)	Total	Of total (%)	Change (%)
Labour	46	3	0	▲3	64.8	1,273,916	49.9	▲1.2
Conservative	20	0	4	▼4	28.2	960,675	37.6	▼3.0
Liberal	5	2	1	▲1	7.0	172,447	6.8	▼0.8
SNP	0	0	0	Steady	—	128,474	5.0	▲2.6
Communist	0	0	0	Steady	—	16,230	0.6	▲0.1
Independent	0	Did not stand in 1964			—	516	0.0	—N/a
Socialist (GB)	0	0	0	Steady	—	122	0.0	Steady
Blank and invalid votes						5,188	—	—
Total	71			0	100.0	2,552,380 (Note: All valid votes excluding spoiled votes.)	100.0	0.0
Registered voters, and turnout						3,359,891	76.0	▼1.6

Popular vote
Labour	49.9%
Conservative	37.6%
Liberal	6.8%
SNP	5.0%
Other	0.6%

Parliamentary seats
Labour	64.8%
Conservative	28.2%
Liberal	7.0%

== See also ==
- 1966 United Kingdom general election in England
- 1966 United Kingdom general election in Wales
- 1966 United Kingdom general election in Northern Ireland
- List of MPs for constituencies in Scotland (1966–1970)
