= Opinion polling for the 1966 United Kingdom general election =

In the run-up to the 1966 general election, various polling organisations conducted opinion polling to gauge voting intention amongst the general public. Such polls, dating from the previous election in 1964 to polling day on 31 March 1966, are listed in this article.

== Graphical summaries ==
UK opinion polling for the 1966 election Conservative Labour Liberal

== Polling results ==
All Data is from PollBase

=== 1966 ===
Fieldwork	Polling Organisation	Lab	Con	Lib	Lead
31 Mar	General Election Results	48.0%	41.9%	8.5%	6.1%
Mar	Harris/Daily Express	54.1%	37.4%	7.7%	16.7%
27–29 Mar	NOP/Daily Mail	50.6%	41.6%	7.4%	9%
24–28 Mar	Gallup/Daily Telegraph	51%	40%	8%	11%
Mar	Harris/Daily Express	52.5%	40%	7.5%	12.5%
22–26 Mar	NOP/Daily Mail	52.2%	39.6%	7.6%	12.6%
Mar	Research Services	49.7%	41.6%	8.3%	8.1%
Mar	Gallup	50.5%	42%	7%	8.5%
Mar	Harris/Daily Express	53.5%	39%	7.5%	14.5%
Mar	Gallup	50.5%	42%	7%	8.5%
16–21 Mar	NOP/Daily Mail	52%	39.5%	7.8%	12.5%
Mar	Research Services	49.7%	42.4%	7.4%	7.3%
Mar	Gallup	52%	41.5%	6%	10.5%
Mar	Gallup	51%	39%	9.5%	12%
Mar	Harris/Daily Express	55%	37.5%	7.5%	17.5%
9–14 Mar	NOP/Daily Mail	52.6%	39.2%	7.7%	13.4%
10 Mar	The 43rd Parliament is dissolved and campaigning officially begins				
Mar	Research Services	49.6%	41.9%	8.1%	7.7%
Mar	Gallup	52.5%	40.5%	6.5%	12%
Mar	Gallup	51%	41%	7.5%	10%
Mar	Harris/Daily Express	54.5%	40%	5.5%	14.5%
2–7 Mar	NOP/Daily Mail	53.8%	39.4%	6.5%	14.4%
Mar	Harris/Daily Express	54%	39%	7%	15%
Mar	Research Services	49.4%	44.9%	5.2%	4.5%
Mar	Gallup/Daily Telegraph	51%	40%	7.5%	11%
23–28 Feb	NOP/Daily Mail	53%	40.1%	6.7%	12.9%
Feb	Gallup/Daily Telegraph	51%	42%	6.5%	9%
10–14 Feb	NOP/Daily Mail	53.8%	39.8%	6.3%	14%
Feb	Gallup/Daily Telegraph	50%	42.5%	7%	7.5%
27–31 Jan	NOP/Daily Mail	54.3%	39%	6.4%	15.3%
6–10 Jan	NOP/Daily Mail	53.3%	39.2%	7.3%	14.1%
Jan	Gallup/Daily Telegraph	47.5%	42%	9.5%	5.5%

=== 1965 ===
Fieldwork	Polling Organisation	Lab	Con	Lib	Lead
Dec	Gallup/Daily Telegraph	48.5%	40.5%	10%	8%
9–13 Dec	NOP/Daily Mail	55.5%	36.3%	8%	19.2%
25–30 Nov	NOP/Daily Mail	50.4%	41.6%	7.7%	8.8%
Nov	Gallup/Daily Telegraph	48.5%	42%	8.5%	6.5%
11–15 Nov	NOP/Daily Mail	56%	37.2%	6.5%	18.8%
21–25 Oct	NOP/Daily Mail	51%	40.6%	8%	10.4%
Oct	Gallup/Daily Telegraph	49%	41.5%	9%	7.5%
Sep	Gallup/Daily Telegraph	48.5%	42%	8.5%	6.5%
23–27 Sep	NOP/Daily Mail	46.4%	42.4%	10.9%	4%
9–13 Sep	NOP/Daily Mail	46.1%	43.5%	10.1%	2.6%
Aug	Gallup/Daily Telegraph	41.5%	49%	8.5%	7.5%
5–9 Aug	NOP/Daily Mail	43.1%	46.9%	9.5%	3.8%
27 Jul	Edward Heath elected Conservative Party leader				
22–26 Jul	NOP/Daily Mail	47.7%	42.4%	9.5%	5.3%
Jul	Gallup/Daily Telegraph	45%	46.5%	8%	1.5%
8–12 Jul	NOP/Daily Mail	47.3%	42.5%	9.9%	4.8%
24–29 Jun	NOP/Daily Mail	45.8%	43.7%	9.9%	2.1%
10–15 Jun	NOP/Daily Mail	47%	41.6%	10.4%	5.4%
Jun	Gallup/Daily Telegraph	42.5%	47%	9.5%	4.5%
20–24 May	NOP/Daily Mail	46.3%	42.6%	10.3%	3.7%
May	Gallup/Daily Telegraph	43%	44%	12.5%	1%
6–10 May	NOP/Daily Mail	47.2%	41.4%	11%	5.8%
Apr	Gallup/Daily Telegraph	47.5%	39.5%	12.5%	8%
8–12 Apr	NOP/Daily Mail	46.2%	40.8%	12.5%	5.4%
25–29 Mar	NOP/Daily Mail	48.7%	39.2%	11.7%	9.5%
Mar	Gallup/Daily Telegraph	46%	43.5%	9.5%	2.5%
11–15 Mar	NOP/Daily Mail	50.2%	41.1%	8.4%	9.1%
Feb	Gallup/Daily Telegraph	45%	45.5%	9%	0.5%
8–16 Feb	NOP/Daily Mail	48.2%	43.5%	8.2%	4.7%
7–11 Jan	NOP/Daily Mail	48.8%	40.2%	10.4%	8.6%
Jan	Gallup/Daily Telegraph	46.5%	42.5%	10.5%	4%

=== 1964 ===
Fieldwork	Polling Organisation	Lab	Con	Lib	Lead
Dec	Gallup/Daily Telegraph	50.5%	40%	9%	10.5%
3–7 Dec	NOP/Daily Mail	48.7%	38.8%	12.2%	9.9%
19–22 Nov	NOP/Daily Mail	51.7%	37.9%	10.4%	13.8%
Nov	Gallup/Daily Telegraph	50%	38.5%	11%	11.5%
5–8 Nov	NOP/Daily Mail	50.3%	39%	10.5%	11.3%
22–26 Oct	NOP/Daily Mail	50.7%	36.6%	12%	14.1%
15 Oct	General Election Results	44.1%	43.4%	11.2%	0.7%
