= 1966 United Kingdom general election in Northern Ireland =

- 31 March 1966

All 12 Northern Ireland seat in the House of Commons
- Turnout: 66.1% (▼5.6 pp)
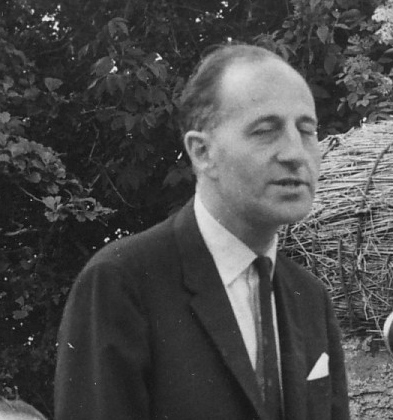
	First party	Second party
		RLP
Leader	Terence O'Neill	Gerry Fitt
Party	UUP	Republican Labour
Alliance	Conservative
Leader since	1963	1964
Leader's seat	Sat in Stormont	Ran in Belfast West (won)
Last election	12 seats, 63.2%	0 seats, 2.3%
Seats won	11	1
Seat change	▼1	▲1
Popular vote	368,629	26,292
Percentage	61.8%	4.4%
Swing	▼1.4 pp	▲2.1 pp

On 31 March 1966, the 1966 United Kingdom general election was held in Northern Ireland, to elect all 630 members of the House of Commons, including the 12 Northern Ireland seats.

The Ulster Unionists lost one seat to Gerry Fitt, leader of the new Republican Labour Party.

In the election as a whole, the Labour Party increased their majority and Harold Wilson continued as Prime Minister. The Conservative Party, which included the Ulster Unionists, were now led by Edward Heath.

== Candidates ==
Affiliation	Candidates
Ulster Unionist Party	12
Independent Republican (Ireland)	5
Northern Ireland Labour Party	4
Ulster Liberal Party	3
Republican Labour Party	1
Nationalist Party	1
Unity	1
Total	27

== Results ==
Party	Seats					Aggregate Votes		
Party	Total	Gains	Losses	Net	Of all (%)	Total	Of all (%)	Change (%)
UUP	11	0	1	▼1	91.7	368,629	61.8	▼1.4
Republican Labour	1	1	0	▲1	8.3	26,292	4.4	▲2.1
NI Labour	0	0	0	Steady	—	72,613	12.2	▼3.9
Ind. Republican	0	0	0	Steady	—	62,782	10.5	▼5.4
Ulster Liberal	0	0	0	Steady	—	29,109	4.9	▲2.2
Nationalist	0	Did not stand in 1964			—	22,167	3.7	—N/a
Unity	0	New			—	14,645	2.5	New
Blank and invalid votes						2,323	—	—
Total	12			0	100.0	596,237 (Note: All valid votes excluding spoiled votes.)	100.0	0.0
Registered voters, and turnout						902,288	66.1	▼5.6

Popular vote
UUP	61.8%
NI Labour	12.2%
Ind. Republican	10.5%
Ulster Liberal	4.9%
Republican Labour	4.4%
National	3.7%
Unity	2.5%

Parliamentary seats
UUP	91.7%
Republican Labour	8.3%

== MPs elected ==
Constituency	Party	MP
Antrim North	UUP	Henry Clark
Antrim South	UUP	Knox Cunningham
Armagh	UUP	John Maginnis
Belfast East	UUP	Stanley McMaster
Belfast North	UUP	Stratton Mills
Belfast South	UUP	Rafton Pounder
Belfast West	Republican Labour	Gerry Fitt
Down North	UUP	George Currie
Down South	UUP	Lawrence Orr
Fermanagh and South Tyrone	UUP	Marquess of Abercorn
Londonderry	UUP	Robin Chichester-Clark
Mid Ulster	UUP	George Forrest

=== By-elections ===
By-election	Date	Incumbent	Party	Winner	Party	Cause
Mid Ulster	17 April 1969	George Forrest	UUP	Bernadette Devlin	Unity	Death

== See also ==
- 1966 United Kingdom general election in England
- 1966 United Kingdom general election in Scotland
- 1966 United Kingdom general election in Wales
