= 1966 United Kingdom general election =

- 31 March 1966

All 630 seats in the House of Commons 316 seats needed for a majority
- Opinion polls
- Registered: 35,957,245
- Turnout: 27,264,747; 75.8% (▼1.3 pp)
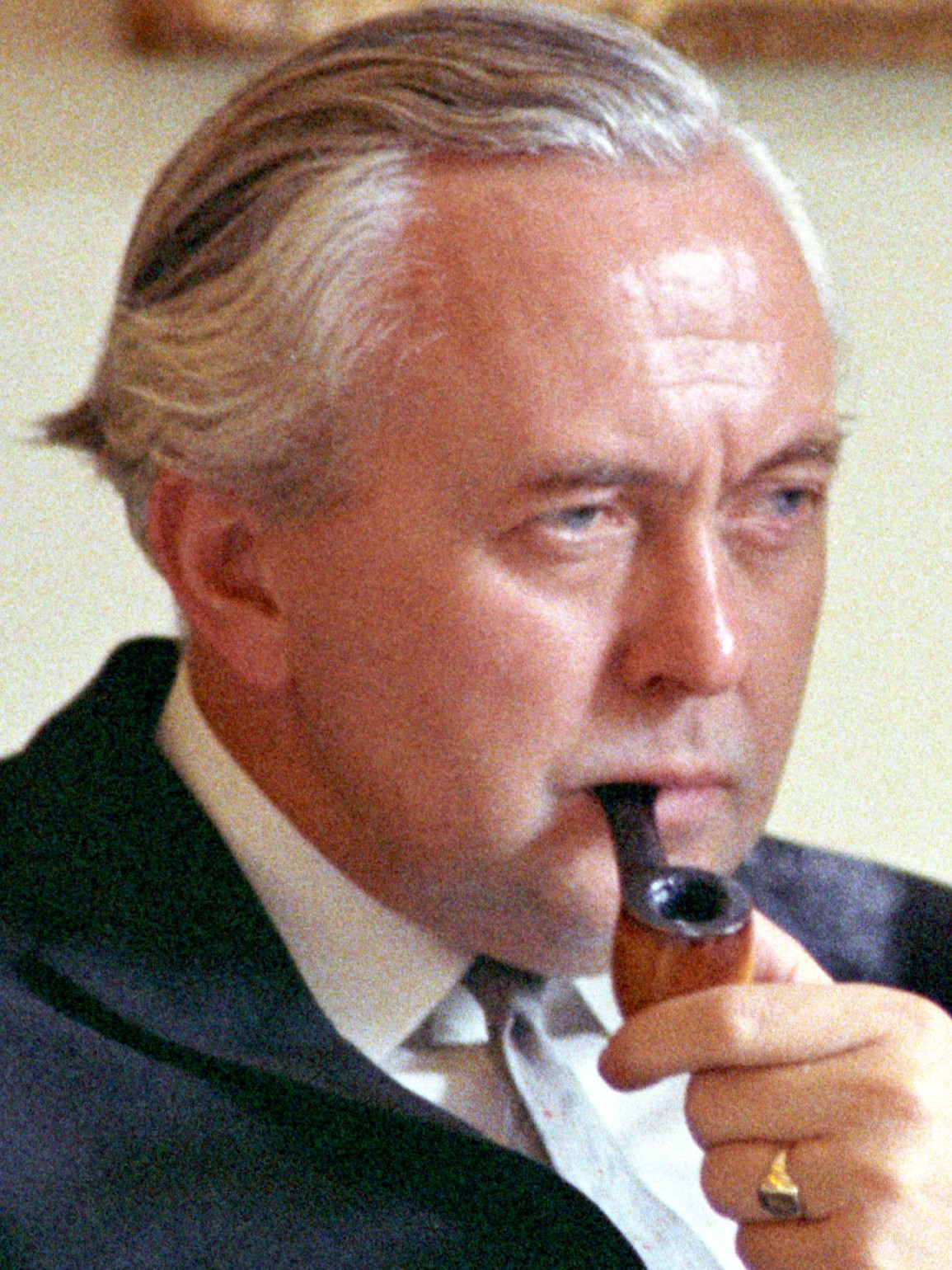

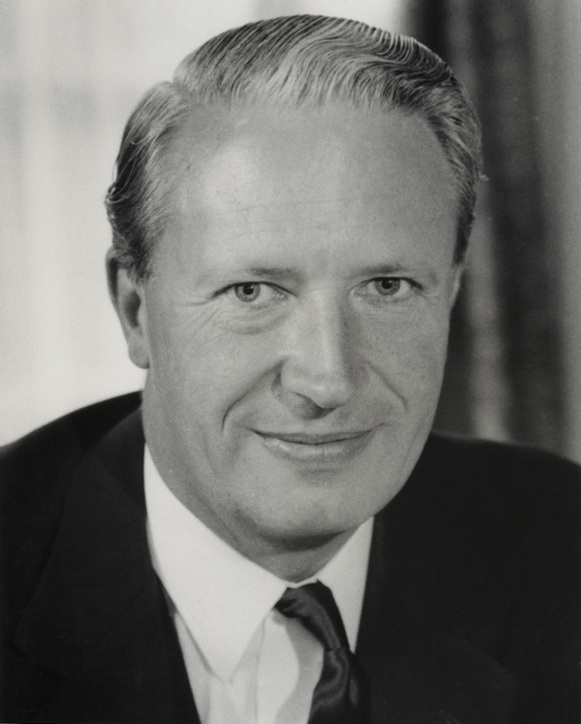

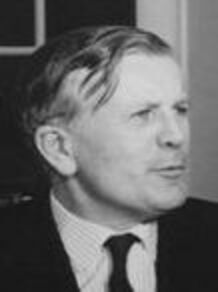
	First party	Second party	Third party
Leader	Harold Wilson	Edward Heath	Jo Grimond
Party	Labour	Conservative	Liberal
Leader since	14 February 1963	28 July 1965	5 November 1956
Leader's seat	Huyton	Bexley	Orkney and Shetland
Last election	317 seats, 44.1%	304 seats, 43.4%	9 seats, 11.2%
Seats won	364 (Note: Figure includes Speaker of the House of Commons Horace King in Southampton Itchen.)	253	12
Seat change	▲47	▼51	▲3
Popular vote	13,096,629	11,418,455	2,327,457
Percentage	48.0%	41.9%	8.5%
Swing	▲3.9 pp	▼1.5 pp	▼2.7 pp
- Colours denote the winning party—as shown in § Results

- Composition of the House of Commons after the election
Prime Minister before election
Harold Wilson
Labour
Prime Minister after election
Harold Wilson
Labour

A general election was held in the United Kingdom on Thursday 31 March 1966. The result was a landslide victory for the Labour Party led by incumbent Prime Minister Harold Wilson.

Wilson decided to call a snap election since his government, elected a mere 17 months previously, in 1964, had an unworkably small majority of only four MPs. The Labour government was returned following this snap election with a much larger majority of 96 seats. This was the last British general election in which the voting age was 21; Wilson's government passed an amendment to the Representation of the People Act in 1969 to include eligibility to vote at the age of 18, which was in place for the next general election in 1970.

This was the only election between 1945 and 1997 in which the Labour Party won a workable majority sustainable to last a full term. In the next seven general elections, the Labour Party would win a majority of seats only once (October 1974) and would lose five elections to the Conservatives.

== Background ==
Prior to the 1966 general election, Labour had performed poorly in local elections in 1965, and lost a by-election, cutting their majority to just two. Shortly after the local elections, the leader of the Conservative Party Alec Douglas-Home was replaced by Edward Heath in the 1965 leadership election.

Despite setbacks and a small majority, Labour believed it had an advantage due to the disorientation from the change of leadership at the Conservative Party, the improvement of economic conditions under its brief government, and a victory at the 1966 Kingston upon Hull North by-election. The Conservatives had not had much time to prepare their campaign, although it was more professional than previously. There had been little time for Heath to become well known among the British public, having led the party for just eight months before the election. For the Liberal Party, money was an issue: two elections in the space of just two years had left the party in a tight financial position and had to field fewer candidates. Labour ran its campaign with the slogan "You know Labour government works" and avoided commenting on controversial issues such as European integration, trade unions, and nationalisation.

Wilson scheduled speeches around the BBC 8:50 pm news bulletin. As the network broadcast his speeches live, an aide told him when he appeared on camera. Wilson immediately spoke the message he wanted viewers to hear without transition from where he was in the speech, mystifying the local audience. BBC began recording his speeches for later broadcast; a member of the Board of Governors of the BBC said "We couldn't tolerate this news editing by the Prime Minister".

The election night was broadcast live on the BBC, was presented by Cliff Michelmore, Ian Trethowan, Robin Day, Robert McKenzie and David Butler. The election was replayed on the BBC Parliament channel on the 40th anniversary of the event, and again in 2016 to mark the 50th anniversary of the election. Alastair Burnet hosted ITN's coverage.

Although the BBC's telecast was in black and white, a couple of colour television cameras were placed in the BBC election studio at Television Centre to allow CBS's Charles Collingwood and NBC's David Brinkley to file live reports from that studio by satellite and in colour for their respective networks' evening news programmes (which were transmitted at 11:30 pm British time, 6:30 pm Eastern Standard Time).

== Timeline ==
The Prime Minister, Harold Wilson, announced on 28 February that Parliament would be dissolved on 10 March, for an election to be held on 31 March. The key dates were as follows:

Thursday 10 March	Dissolution of the 43rd Parliament and campaigning officially begins
Monday 21 March	Last day to file nomination papers; 1,707 candidates enter to contest 630 seats
Wednesday 30 March	Campaigning officially ends
Thursday 31 March	Polling day
Friday 1 April	The Labour Party wins with an improved majority of 96
Monday 18 April	44th Parliament assembles
Thursday 21 April	State Opening of Parliament

== Opinion polling ==
- Research Services: 3% swing to Labour (forecast majority of 101)
- National opinion polls: 3.5% swing to Labour (forecast majority of 115)
- Gallup: 4.5% swing to Labour (forecast majority of 150)
- Express (known as Harris): 7.5% swing to Labour (forecast majority of in excess of 255)

== Aftermath ==
The Labour Party performed very well in the election and expanded its previously slim majority against the Conservative opposition to 97 seats, accomplishing a net gain of 47 seats. It won 364 seats from 48 per cent of the vote, against 253 seats from 41.4 per cent for the Conservatives and 12 seats from 8 per cent for the Liberals. A major reason for the Labour victory was the revitalization of the party's working-class support in the 1960s. It captured its highest support yet from manual laborers at 69 per cent, as well as its best performance for non-manual laborers since 1945. The government also appealed to both the right wing of the party with its cabinet dominated by junior ministers of the Attlee ministry as well as the left wing by the presence of officials such as Prime Minister Wilson, Richard Crossman, Barbara Castle, and Frank Cousins. Although the party would go on to win more seats under Tony Blair in 1997 and 2001, and again under Keir Starmer in 2024, Labour have never since matched the 48% of the popular vote they won in 1966.

== Results ==
=== Summary of seats returned ===
Party	Leader	MPs		Aggregate votes	
Party	Leader		Of total		Of total
Labour Party	Harold Wilson	364 (Note: Includes 18 Co-operative Party MP, as part of the Labour-Co-op alliance.)	57.8%	13,096,629	48.0%
Conservative and Unionist Party	Edward Heath	253	40.2%	11,418,455	41.9%
Conservative Party (Note: Conservative and Unionist Party results for Great Britain. The Unionist Party had officially merged with the Conservatives fully in 1965.)	Edward Heath	239	37.9%	10,900,047	40.0%
Ulster Unionist Party	Terence O'Neill	11	1.7%	368,629	1.4%
National Liberal Party	David Renton	3	0.5%	149,779	0.5%
Liberal Party	Jo Grimond	12	1.9%	2,327,457	8.5%
Republican Labour Party	Gerry Fitt	1	0.2%	26,292	0.1%

=== Full results ===

Results of the March 1966 general election to the House of Commons of the United Kingdom
Party	Leader	Candidates	MPs					Aggregate votes		
Party	Leader	Candidates	Total	Gains	Losses	Net	Of total (%)	Total	Of total (%)	Change (%)
Labour	Harold; Wilson	622 (Note: Includes 24 Co-operative Party candidates, as part of the Labour-Co-op alliance.)	364 (Note: Includes 18 Co-operative Party MPs, as part of the Labour-Co-op alliance.)	48	1	▲47 (Note: Includes ▼1 Co-operative Party MPs, as part of the Labour-Co-op alliance.)	57.8 (Note: Includes 2.9% for the Co-operative Party, as part of the Labour-Co-op alliance.)	13,096,629 (Note: Includes 507,372 for the Co-operative Party, as part of the Labour-Co-op alliance.)	48.0 (Note: Includes 1.9% for the Co-operative Party, as part of the Labour-Co-op alliance.)	▲3.9 (Note: Includes ▼0.1% for the Co-operative Party, as part of the Labour-Co-op alliance.)
Conservative (Total)	Edward; Heath	629	253	1	52	▼51	40.2	11,418,455	41.9	▼1.5
Conservative (Note: Figure includes the Ulster Unionist Party under its nation affiliation with the Conservative Party.)	Edward; Heath	611	250	1 (Note: Holland with Boston from the National Liberal Party.)	49	▼48	47.3	11,268,676	41.3	▼0.9
National Liberal	David; Renton	19	3	0	3	▼3	0.5	149,779	0.5	▼0.7
Liberal	Jo; Grimond	311	12	5	2	▲3	1.9	2,327,457	8.5	▼2.7
SNP	Arthur; Donaldson	23	0	0	0	Steady	—	128,474	0.5	▲0.3
Independent; Republican	—N/a	5	0	0	0	Steady	—	62,782	0.2	▼0.2
Communist	John; Gollan	57	0	0	0	Steady	—	62,092	0.2	Steady
Plaid Cymru	Gwynfor; Evans	20	0	0	0	Steady	—	61,071	0.2	▼0.1
Republican; Labour	Gerry; Fitt	1 (Note: Leader Gerry Fitt stood in Belfast West.)	1	1	0	▲1	0.2	26,292	0.1	Steady
Independent	—N/a	14	0	0	0	Steady	—	23,900	0.1	Steady
Nationalist	Eddie; McAteer	1	0	Did not stand in 1964			—	22,167	0.1	—N/a
Unity	—N/a	1	0	New			—	14,645	0.1	New
British; National	John; Bean	3	0	0	0	Steady	—	5,182	0.0	Steady
Union Movement	Oswald; Mosley	4	0	New			—	4,075	0.0	New
Independent; Conservative	—N/a	3	0	0	0	Steady	—	3,206	0.0	Steady
Independent; Labour	—N/a	1 (Note: Candidate William Grant stood in Bootle.)	0	0	0	Steady	—	1,931	0.0	Steady
New Liberal	Alan; Lomas	1 (Note: Leader Alan Ernest Lomas stood in Islington East.)	0	0	0	Steady	—	1,127	0.0	Steady
Fellowship	Ronald; Mallone	1 (Note: General Secretary of the Fellowship Party Ronald Mallone stood in Woolwich West.)	1	0	0	Steady	—	906	0.0	Steady
Coalition Unity	Peter; Lowe	1 (Note: Candidate Peter Lowe stood in Fylde North.)	0	New			—	826	0.0	New
National Democratic	David; Brown	1 (Note: Leader David Brown stood in Ipswich.)	0	0	0	Steady	—	769	0.0	Steady
Independent; Liberal	—N/a	1 (Note: Candidate Elisa Sheriff stood in Fulham.)	0	0	0	Steady	—	716	0.0	▼0.1
Teenage; Party	David; Sutch	1 (Note: Candidate David Sutch stood in Huyton.)	0	New			—	585	0.0	New
Ind. Labour Party	Emrys; Thomas	1 (Note: Candidate William Hanley stood in Leyton.)	0	Did not stand in 1964			—	441	0.0	—N/a
Social Credit	Archie; Frost	1 (Note: Candidate Archie S. Frost stood in Rugby.)	0	0	0	Steady	—	397	0.0	Steady
Socialist (GB)	Collective; Leadership	2	0	0	0	Steady	—	333	0.0	Steady
Radical; Alliance (Note: Radical Alliance was successor name for the Independent Nuclear Disarmament Election Committee.)	Pat; Arrowsmith	1 (Note: Leader Pat Arrowsmith stood in Fulham.)	0	0	0	Steady	—	163	0.0	Steady
Patriotic Party	Richard; Hilton	1 (Note: Candidate Arthur Rossi Braybrooke stood in Fulham.)	0	0	0	Steady	—	126	0.0	Steady
Blank and invalid votes								49,899	—	—
Total		1,707	630			0	100.0	27,264,747 (Note: All valid votes excluding spoiled votes.)	100.0	0.0
Registered voters, and turnout								35,957,245	75.8	▼1.3

=== Votes summary ===
Popular vote
Labour	48.04%
Conservative	41.88%
Liberal	8.54%
Others	1.55%

=== Seats summary ===
Parliamentary seats
Labour	57.78%
Conservative	40.16%
Liberal	1.90%
Others	0.16%

== Incumbents defeated ==
Party	Name	Constituency	Office held whilst in Parliament	Defeated by	Party
Conservative	Priscilla Buchan	Aberdeen South		Donald Dewar	Labour
Conservative	Forbes Hendry	Aberdeenshire West		James Davidson	Liberal
Conservative	Geoffrey Howe	Bebington		Edwin Brooks	Labour
Conservative	Norman Cole	Bedfordshire South		Gwilym Roberts	Labour
Conservative	James Kilfedder	Belfast West		Gerry Fitt	Republican Labour
Conservative	William Anstruther-Gray	Berwick and East Lothian	Chairman of the 1922 Committee	John Mackintosh	Labour
Conservative	Edward Gardner	Billericay		Eric Moonman	Labour
Conservative	Wyndham Davies	Birmingham Perry Barr		Christopher Price	Labour
Conservative	Arthur Tiley	Bradford West		Norman Haseldine	Labour
Conservative	Dudley Smith	Brentford and Chiswick		Michael Barnes	Labour
Conservative	Alan Hopkins	Bristol North East		Raymond Dobson	Labour
Conservative	Martin McLaren	Bristol North West		John Ellis	Labour
Conservative	Donald Box	Cardiff North		Ted Rowlands	Labour
Conservative	William Shepard	Cheadle		Michael Winstanley	Liberal
Conservative	Patricia Hornsby-Smith	Chislehurst		Alistair Macdonald	Labour
Conservative	Peter Thomas	Conwy		Ednyfed Hudson Davies	Labour
Conservative	James Scott-Hopkins	Cornwall North		John Pardoe	Liberal
Conservative	Richard Thompson	Croydon South		David Winnick	Labour
Conservative	Anthony Meyer	Eton and Slough		Joan Lestor	Labour
Conservative	Rolf Dudley-Williams	Exeter		Gwyneth Dunwoody	Labour
Conservative	Henry Brooke	Hampstead	Former Home Secretary	Ben Whitaker	Labour
Conservative	Anthony Courtney	Harrow East		Roy Roebuck	Labour
Conservative	David Walder	High Peak		Peter Jackson	Labour
Conservative	Godfrey Lagden	Hornchurch		Alan Lee Williams	Labour
Conservative	Albert Cooper	Ilford South		Arnold Shaw	Labour
Conservative	Humphry Berkeley	Lancaster		Stan Henig	Labour
Conservative	Christopher Chataway	Lewisham North		Roland Moyle	Labour
Conservative	Patrick McNair-Wilson	Lewisham West		James Dickens	Labour
Conservative	John Barlow	Middleton and Prestwich		Denis Coe	Labour
Conservative	Peter Thorneycroft	Monmouth	Former Chancellor of the Exchequer	Donald Anderson	Labour
Conservative	William Clark	Nottingham South		George Perry	Labour
Conservative	Montague Woodhouse	Oxford		Evan Luard	Labour
Conservative	Ian Montagu Fraser	Plymouth Sutton		David Owen	Labour
Conservative	Terence Clarke	Portsmouth West		Frank Judd	Labour
Conservative	Julian Amery	Preston North	Former Secretary of State for Air	Ronald Atkins	Labour
Conservative	Peter Emery	Reading		John Lee	Labour
Conservative	Roy Wise	Rugby		William Price	Labour
Conservative	Martin Redmayne	Rushcliffe		Antony Gardner	Labour
Conservative	Peter Griffiths	Smethwick		Andrew Faulds	Labour
Conservative	John Fletcher-Cooke	Southampton Test		Bob Mitchell	Labour
Conservative	Samuel Storey	Stretford	Chairman of Ways and Means	Ernest Davies	Labour
Conservative	William Yates	The Wrekin		Gerald Fowler	Labour
Conservative	Charles Curran	Uxbridge		John Ryan	Labour
Conservative	John Harvey	Walthamstow East		William Robinson	Labour
Conservative	Anthony Fell	Great Yarmouth		Hugh Gray	Labour
Conservative	Charles Longbottom	York		Alex Lyon	Labour
Labour	Patrick Duffy	Colne Valley		Richard Wainwright	Liberal
Liberal	Roderic Bowen	Cardigan		Elystan Morgan	Labour
Liberal	George Mackie	Caithness and Sutherland		Robert Maclennan	Labour

== Televised declarations ==
These declarations were covered live by the BBC where the returning officer was heard to say "duly elected".

From BBC Parliament Replay
Constituency	Winning party 1964	Constituency result 1966 by party						Winning party 1966
Constituency	Winning party 1964	Con	Lab	Lib	PC	SNP	Others	Winning party 1966
Cheltenham	Conservative	22,683	19,768					Conservative hold
Wolverhampton North East	Labour	12,965	21,067					Labour hold
Wolverhampton South West	Conservative	21,466	14,881					Conservative hold
Salford West	Labour	13,257	19,237					Labour hold
Salford East	Labour	9,000	18,409					Labour hold
Exeter	Conservative	18,613	22,189	4,869				Labour gain
Devon North	Liberal	15,631	6,127	16,797				Liberal hold
Smethwick	Conservative	14,550	18,440				508	Labour gain
Nelson and Colne	Labour	13,829	18,406				5,117	Labour hold
Leyton	Labour	18,157	26,803	3,851			441	Labour recovery
Huyton	Labour	20,182	41,132				585	Labour hold
Billericay	Conservative	38,371	40,013	7,587				Labour gain
Preston South	Labour	17,931	20,720					Labour hold
Bexley	Conservative	26,377	24,044	4,405				Conservative hold
Brentford and Chiswick	Conservative	14,031	14,638	2,063				Labour gain
Aberdeenshire West	Conservative	13,956	6,008	15,151				Liberal gain
Taunton	Conservative	22,359	19,216	5,460				Conservative hold
Monmouth	Conservative	25,654	28,619					Labour gain

- The 5,117 votes polled for the "Others" in Nelson and Colne were all polled for Patrick Downey, uncle of Lesley Ann Downey, who had been murdered by the Moors Murderers. Downey advocated the return of hanging.

== See also ==
- List of MPs elected in the 1966 United Kingdom general election
- 1966 United Kingdom general election in England
- 1966 United Kingdom general election in Scotland
- 1966 United Kingdom general election in Wales
- 1966 United Kingdom general election in Northern Ireland
