= List of United Kingdom Parliament constituencies (1955–1974) =

Constituencies in 1950–1955 | 1955 MPs | 1959 MPs | 1964 MPs | 1966 MPs | 1970 MPs | Constituencies in 1974–1983

This is a list of all constituencies that were in existence in the 1955, 1959, 1964, 1966, and 1970 General Elections.

Constituency	Region
Aberavon	Glamorgan
Aberdare	Glamorgan
Aberdeen North	Aberdeenshire
Aberdeen South	Aberdeenshire
Aberdeenshire East	Aberdeenshire
Aberdeenshire West	Aberdeenshire
Abertillery	Monmouthshire
Abingdon	Berkshire
Accrington	Lancashire
Acton	Greater London
Aldershot	Hampshire
Altrincham and Sale	Cheshire
Anglesey	Anglesey
Angus North and Mearns	Angus
Angus South	Angus
Antrim North	Northern Ireland
Antrim South	Northern Ireland
Argyll	Argyll
Armagh	Northern Ireland
Arundel and Shoreham	Sussex
Ashfield	Nottinghamshire
Ashford	Kent
Ashton-under-Lyne	Lancashire
Aylesbury	Buckinghamshire
Ayr	Ayrshire
Ayrshire Central	Ayrshire
Ayrshire North and Bute	Ayrshire
Ayrshire South	Ayrshire
Banbury	Oxfordshire
Banff	Banffshire
Barking	Greater London
Barkston Ash	Yorkshire, North Riding
Barnsley	Yorkshire, West Riding
Barnet	Greater London
Barons Court	Greater London
Barrow-in-Furness	Lancashire
Barry	Glamorgan
Basingstoke	Hampshire
Bassetlaw	Nottinghamshire
Bath	Somerset
Batley and Morley	Yorkshire, West Riding
Battersea North	Greater London
Battersea South	Greater London
Bebington	Cheshire
Beckenham	Greater London
Bedford	Bedfordshire
Bedfordshire Mid	Bedfordshire
Bedfordshire South	Bedfordshire
Bedwellty	Monmouthshire
Belfast East	Northern Ireland
Belfast North	Northern Ireland
Belfast South	Northern Ireland
Belfast West	Northern Ireland
Belper	Derbyshire
Bermondsey	Greater London
Berwick and East Lothian	Berwickshire and East Lothian
Berwick-upon-Tweed	Northumberland
Bethnal Green	Greater London
Bexley	Greater London
Billericay	Essex
Bilston	Staffordshire
Birkenhead	Cheshire
Birmingham All Saints	Warwickshire
Birmingham Aston	Warwickshire
Birmingham Edgbaston	Warwickshire
Birmingham Hall Green	Warwickshire
Birmingham Handsworth	Warwickshire
Birmingham Ladywood	Warwickshire
Birmingham Northfield	Warwickshire
Birmingham Perry Barr	Warwickshire
Birmingham Selly Oak	Warwickshire
Birmingham Small Heath	Warwickshire
Birmingham Sparkbrook	Warwickshire
Birmingham Stechford	Warwickshire
Birmingham Yardley	Warwickshire
Bishop Auckland	County Durham
Blackburn	Lancashire
Blackpool North	Lancashire
Blackpool South	Lancashire
Blaydon	County Durham
Blyth	Northumberland
Bodmin	Cornwall
Bolsover	Derbyshire
Bolton East	Lancashire
Bolton West	Lancashire
Bootle	Lancashire
Bosworth	Leicestershire
Bothwell	Lanarkshire
Bournemouth East and Christchurch	Dorset
Bournemouth West	Dorset
Bradford East	Yorkshire, West Riding
Bradford North	Yorkshire, West Riding
Bradford South	Yorkshire, West Riding
Bradford West	Yorkshire, West Riding
Brecon and Radnor	Brecknockshire and Radnorshire
Brentford and Chiswick	Greater London
Bridgwater	Somerset
Bridlington	Yorkshire, East Riding
Brierley Hill	Worcestershire
Brigg	Lincolnshire
Brighouse and Spenborough	Yorkshire, West Riding
Brighton Kemptown	Sussex
Brighton Pavilion	Sussex
Bristol Central	Gloucestershire
Bristol North East	Gloucestershire
Bristol North West	Gloucestershire
Bristol South	Gloucestershire
Bristol South East	Gloucestershire
Bristol West	Gloucestershire
Brixton	Greater London
Bromley	Greater London
Bromsgrove	Worcestershire
Buckingham	Buckinghamshire
Buckinghamshire South	Buckinghamshire
Burnley	Lancashire
Burton	Staffordshire
Bury and Radcliffe	Lancashire
Bury St Edmunds	Suffolk
Caernarfon	Caernarfonshire
Caerphilly	Glamorgan
Caithness and Sutherland	Caithness and Sutherland
Cambridge	Cambridgeshire
Cambridgeshire	Cambridgeshire
Cannock	Staffordshire
Canterbury	Kent
Cardiff North	Glamorgan
Cardiff South East	Glamorgan
Cardiff West	Glamorgan
Cardiganshire	Cardiganshire
Carlisle	Cumberland
Carlton	Nottinghamshire
Carmarthen	Carmarthenshire
Carshalton	Greater London
Cheadle	Cheshire
Chelmsford	Essex
Chelsea	Greater London
Cheltenham	Gloucestershire
Chertsey	Surrey
Chester	Cheshire
Chesterfield	Derbyshire
Chester-le-Street	County Durham
Chichester	West Sussex
Chigwell	Essex
Chippenham	Wiltshire
Chislehurst	Greater London
Chorley	Lancashire
Cirencester and Tewkesbury	Gloucestershire
Clapham	Greater London
Cleveland	Yorkshire, North Riding
Clitheroe	Lancashire
Coatbridge and Airdrie	Lanarkshire
Colchester	Essex
Colne Valley	Yorkshire, West Riding
Consett	County Durham
Conway	Caernarfonshire
Cornwall North	Cornwall
Coventry East	Warwickshire
Coventry North	Warwickshire
Coventry South	Warwickshire
Crewe	Cheshire
Crosby	Lancashire
Croydon North East	Greater London
Croydon North West	Greater London
Croydon South	Greater London
Dagenham	Greater London
Darlington	County Durham
Dartford	Kent
Darwen	Lancashire
Dearne Valley	Yorkshire, West Riding
Denbigh	Denbighshire
Deptford	Greater London
Derby North	Derbyshire
Derby South	Derbyshire
Derbyshire North East	Derbyshire
Derbyshire South East	Derbyshire
Derbyshire West	Derbyshire
Devizes	Wiltshire
Devon North	Devon
Dewsbury	Yorkshire, West Riding
Doncaster	Yorkshire, West Riding
Don Valley	Yorkshire, West Riding
Dorking	Surrey
Dorset North	Dorset
Dorset South	Dorset
Dorset West	Dorset
Dover	Kent
Down North	Northern Ireland
Down South	Northern Ireland
Dudley	Worcestershire
Dulwich	Greater London
Dumfries	Dumfriesshire
Dunbartonshire Central	Dunbartonshire
Dunbartonshire East	Dunbartonshire
Dunbartonshire West	Dunbartonshire
Dundee East	Angus
Dundee West	Angus
Dunfermline Burghs	Fife
Durham	County Durham
Durham North West	County Durham
Ealing North	Greater London
Ealing South	Greater London
Easington	County Durham
Eastbourne	Sussex
East Grinstead	Sussex
East Ham North	Greater London
East Ham South	Greater London
Eastleigh	Hampshire
Ebbw Vale	Monmouthshire
Eccles	Greater Manchester
Edinburgh Central	Midlothian
Edinburgh East	Midlothian
Edinburgh Leith	Midlothian
Edinburgh North	Midlothian
Edinburgh Pentlands	Midlothian
Edinburgh South	Midlothian
Edinburgh West	Midlothian
Edmonton	Greater London
Enfield East	Greater London
Enfield West	Greater London
Epping	Essex
Epsom	Surrey
Erith and Crayford	Greater London
Esher	Surrey
Essex South East	Essex
Eton and Slough	Buckinghamshire
Exeter	Devon
Eye	Suffolk
Falmouth and Camborne	Cornwall
Farnham	Surrey
Farnworth	Lancashire
Faversham	Kent
Feltham	Greater London
Fermanagh and South Tyrone	Northern Ireland
Fife East	Fife
Fife West	Fife
Finchley	Greater London
Flintshire East	Flintshire
Flintshire West	Flintshire
Folkestone and Hythe	Kent
Fulham	Greater London
Fylde North	Lancashire
Fylde South	Lancashire
Gainsborough	Lincolnshire
Galloway	Kirkcudbrightshire and Wigtownshire
Gateshead East	County Durham
Gateshead West	County Durham
Gillingham	Kent
Glasgow Bridgeton	Lanarkshire
Glasgow Cathcart	Lanarkshire
Glasgow Central	Lanarkshire
Glasgow Craigton	Lanarkshire
Glasgow Gorbals	Lanarkshire
Glasgow Govan	Lanarkshire
Glasgow Hillhead	Lanarkshire
Glasgow Kelvingrove	Lanarkshire
Glasgow Maryhill	Lanarkshire
Glasgow Pollok	Lanarkshire
Glasgow Provan	Lanarkshire
Glasgow Scotstoun	Lanarkshire
Glasgow Shettleston	Lanarkshire
Glasgow Springburn	Lanarkshire
Glasgow Woodside	Lanarkshire
Gloucester	Gloucestershire
Gloucestershire South	Gloucestershire
Gloucestershire West	Gloucestershire
Goole	Yorkshire, East Riding
Gosport and Fareham	Hampshire
Gower	Glamorgan
Grantham	Lincolnshire
Gravesend	Kent
Greenock	Renfrewshire
Greenwich	Greater London
Grimsby	Lincolnshire
Guildford	Surrey
Hackney Central	Greater London
Halifax	Yorkshire, West Riding
Haltemprice	Yorkshire, East Riding
Hamilton	Lanarkshire
Hammersmith North	Greater London
Hampstead	Greater London
Harborough	Leicestershire
Harrogate	Yorkshire, North Riding
Harrow Central	Greater London
Harrow East	Greater London
Harrow West	Greater London
The Hartlepools	County Durham
Harwich	Essex
Hastings	Sussex
Hayes and Harlington	Greater London
Hemel Hempstead	Hertfordshire
Hemsworth	Yorkshire, West Riding
Hendon North	Greater London
Hendon South	Greater London
Henley	Oxfordshire
Hereford	Herefordshire
Hertford	Hertfordshire
Hertfordshire East	Hertfordshire
Hertfordshire South West	Hertfordshire
Heston and Isleworth	Greater London
Hexham	Northumberland
Heywood and Royton	Lancashire
High Peak	Derbyshire
Hitchin	Hertfordshire
Holborn and St Pancras South	Greater London
Holland with Boston	Lincolnshire
Honiton	Devon
Horncastle	Lincolnshire
Hornchurch	Greater London
Hornsey	Greater London
Horsham and Crawley	Sussex
Houghton-le-Spring	County Durham
Hove	Sussex
Howden	Yorkshire, East Riding
Huddersfield East	Yorkshire, West Riding
Huddersfield West	Yorkshire, West Riding
Huntingdonshire	Huntingdonshire
Huyton	Lancashire
Ilford North	Greater London
Ilford South	Greater London
Ilkeston	Derbyshire
Ince	Lancashire
Inverness	Inverness-shire
Ipswich	Suffolk
Isle of Ely	Cambridgeshire
Isle of Thanet	Kent
Isle of Wight	Isle of Wight
Islington East	Greater London
Islington North	Greater London
Islington South West	Greater London
Jarrow	County Durham
Keighley	Yorkshire, West Riding
Kensington North	Greater London
Kensington South	Greater London
Kettering	Northamptonshire
Kidderminster	Worcestershire
Kilmarnock	Ayrshire
King's Lynn	Norfolk
Kingston upon Hull East	Yorkshire, East Riding
Kingston upon Hull North	Yorkshire, East Riding
Kingston upon Hull West	Yorkshire, East Riding
Kingston-upon-Thames	Greater London
Kinross and West Perthshire	Kinross-shire and Perthshire
Kirkcaldy Burghs	Fife
Knutsford	Cheshire
Lanark	Lanarkshire
Lanarkshire North	Lanarkshire
Lancaster	Lancashire
Leeds East	Yorkshire, West Riding
Leeds North East	Yorkshire, West Riding
Leeds North West	Yorkshire, West Riding
Leeds South	Yorkshire, West Riding
Leeds South East	Yorkshire, West Riding
Leeds West	Yorkshire, West Riding
Leek	Staffordshire
Leicester North East	Leicestershire
Leicester North West	Leicestershire
Leicester South East	Leicestershire
Leicester South West	Leicestershire
Leigh	Lancashire
Leominster	Herefordshire
Lewes	Sussex
Lewisham North	Greater London
Lewisham South	Greater London
Lewisham West	Greater London
Leyton	Greater London
Lichfield and Tamworth	Staffordshire
Lincoln	Lincolnshire
Liverpool Edge Hill	Lancashire
Liverpool Exchange	Lancashire
Liverpool Garston	Lancashire
Liverpool Kirkdale	Lancashire
Liverpool Scotland	Lancashire
Liverpool Toxteth	Lancashire
Liverpool Walton	Lancashire
Liverpool Wavertree	Lancashire
Liverpool West Derby	Lancashire
Llanelli	Carmarthenshire
Cities of London and Westminster	Greater London
Londonderry	Northern Ireland
Loughborough	Leicestershire
Louth, Lincolnshire	Lincolnshire
Lowestoft	Suffolk
Ludlow	Shropshire
Luton	Bedfordshire
Macclesfield	Cheshire
Maidstone	Kent
Maldon	Essex
Manchester Ardwick	Lancashire
Manchester Blackley	Lancashire
Manchester Cheetham	Lancashire
Manchester Exchange	Lancashire
Manchester Gorton	Lancashire
Manchester Moss Side	Lancashire
Manchester Openshaw	Lancashire
Manchester Withington	Lancashire
Manchester Wythenshawe	Lancashire
Mansfield	Nottinghamshire
Melton	Leicestershire
Meriden	Warwickshire
Merionethshire	Merionethshire
Merthyr Tydfil	Glamorgan
Merton and Morden	Greater London
Middlesbrough East	Yorkshire, North Riding
Middlesbrough West	Yorkshire, North Riding
Middleton and Prestwich	Lancashire
Midlothian	Midlothian
Mitcham	Greater London
Monmouth	Monmouthshire
Montgomeryshire	Montgomeryshire
Moray and Nairn	Morayshire and Nairnshire
Morecambe and Lonsdale	Lancashire
Morpeth	Northumberland
Motherwell and Wishaw	Lanarkshire
Nantwich	Cheshire
Neath	Glamorgan
Nelson and Colne	Lancashire
Newark	Nottinghamshire
Newbury	Berkshire
Newcastle-under-Lyme	Staffordshire
Newcastle upon Tyne Central	Northumberland
Newcastle upon Tyne East	Northumberland
Newcastle upon Tyne North	Northumberland
Newcastle upon Tyne West	Northumberland
New Forest	Hampshire
Newport (Monmouthshire)	Monmouthshire
Newton	Lancashire
Norfolk Central	Norfolk
Norfolk North	Norfolk
Norfolk South	Norfolk
Norfolk South West	Norfolk
Normanton	Yorkshire, West Riding
Northampton	Northamptonshire
Northampton South	Northamptonshire
Northwich	Cheshire
Norwich North	Norfolk
Norwich South	Norfolk
Norwood	Greater London
Nottingham Central	Nottinghamshire
Nottingham North	Nottinghamshire
Nottingham South	Nottinghamshire
Nottingham West	Nottinghamshire
Nuneaton	Warwickshire
Ogmore	Glamorgan
Oldbury and Halesowen	Worcestershire
Oldham East	Lancashire
Oldham West	Lancashire
Orkney and Shetland	Orkney and Shetland
Ormskirk	Lancashire
Orpington	Greater London
Oswestry	Shropshire
Oxford	Oxfordshire
Paddington North	Greater London
Paddington South	Greater London
Paisley	Renfrewshire
Peckham	Greater London
Pembroke	Pembrokeshire
Penistone	Yorkshire, West Riding
Penrith and the Border	Cumberland
Perth and East Perthshire	Perthshire
Peterborough	Northamptonshire
Petersfield	Hampshire
Plymouth Devonport	Devon
Plymouth Sutton	Devon
Pontefract	Yorkshire, West Riding
Pontypool	Monmouthshire
Pontypridd	Glamorgan
Poole	Dorset
Poplar	Greater London
Portsmouth Langstone	Hampshire
Portsmouth South	Hampshire
Portsmouth West	Hampshire
Preston North	Lancashire
Preston South	Lancashire
Pudsey	Yorkshire, West Riding
Putney	Greater London
Reading	Berkshire
Reigate	Surrey
Renfrewshire East	Renfrewshire
Renfrewshire West	Renfrewshire
Rhondda East	Glamorgan
Rhondda West	Glamorgan
Richmond (Surrey)	Surrey
Richmond (Yorks)	Yorkshire, North Riding
Ripon	Yorkshire, North Riding
Rochdale	Lancashire
Rochester and Chatham	Kent
Romford	Greater London
Ross and Cromarty	Ross and Cromarty
Rossendale	Lancashire
Rotherham	Yorkshire, West Riding
Rother Valley	Yorkshire, West Riding
Rowley Regis and Tipton	Worcestershire
Roxburgh, Selkirk and Peebles	Roxburghshire, Selkirkshire and Peeblesshire
Rugby	Warwickshire
Ruislip Northwood	Greater London
Runcorn	Cheshire
Rushcliffe	Nottinghamshire
Rutherglen	Lanarkshire
Rutland and Stamford	Rutland and Lincolnshire
Rye	Sussex
Saffron Walden	Essex
St Albans	Hertfordshire
St Helens	Lancashire
St Ives	Cornwall
St Marylebone	Greater London
St Pancras North	Greater London
Salford East	Lancashire
Salford West	Lancashire
Salisbury	Wiltshire
Scarborough and Whitby	Yorkshire, North Riding
Sedgefield	County Durham
Sevenoaks	Kent
Sheffield Attercliffe	Yorkshire, West Riding
Sheffield Brightside	Yorkshire, West Riding
Sheffield Hallam	Yorkshire, West Riding
Sheffield Heeley	Yorkshire, West Riding
Sheffield Hillsborough	Yorkshire, West Riding
Sheffield Park	Yorkshire, West Riding
Shipley	Yorkshire, West Riding
Shoreditch and Finsbury	Greater London
Shrewsbury	Shropshire
Skipton	Yorkshire, North Riding
Smethwick	Staffordshire
Solihull	Warwickshire
Somerset North	Somerset
Southall	Greater London
Southampton Itchen	Hampshire
Southampton Test	Hampshire
Southend East	Essex
Southend West	Essex
Southgate	Greater London
Southport	Lancashire
South Shields	County Durham
Southwark	Greater London
Sowerby	Yorkshire, West Riding
Spelthorne	Surrey
Stafford and Stone	Staffordshire
Staffordshire South West	Staffordshire
Stalybridge and Hyde	Cheshire
Stepney	Greater London
Stirling and Falkirk	Stirlingshire
Stirlingshire East and Clackmannan	Stirlingshire and Clackmannanshire
Stirlingshire West	Stirlingshire
Stockport North	Cheshire
Stockport South	Cheshire
Stockton-on-Tees	County Durham
Stoke Newington and Hackney North	Greater London
Stoke-on-Trent Central	Staffordshire
Stoke-on-Trent North	Staffordshire
Stoke-on-Trent South	Staffordshire
Stratford-on-Avon	Warwickshire
Streatham	Greater London
Stretford	Lancashire
Stroud	Gloucestershire
Sudbury and Woodbridge	Suffolk
Sunderland North	County Durham
Sunderland South	County Durham
Surbiton	Greater London
Surrey East	Surrey
Sutton and Cheam	Greater London
Sutton Coldfield	Warwickshire
Swansea East	Glamorgan
Swansea West	Glamorgan
Swindon	Wiltshire
Taunton	Somerset
Tavistock	Devon
Thirsk and Malton	Yorkshire, North Riding
Thurrock	Essex
Tiverton	Devon
Tonbridge	Kent
Torquay	Devon
Torrington	Devon
Totnes	Devon
Tottenham	Greater London
Truro	Cornwall
Twickenham	Greater London
Tynemouth	Northumberland
Mid Ulster	Northern Ireland
Uxbridge	Greater London
Vauxhall	Greater London
Wakefield	Yorkshire, West Riding
Wallasey	Cheshire
Wallsend	Northumberland
Walsall North	Staffordshire
Walsall South	Staffordshire
Walthamstow East	Greater London
Walthamstow West	Greater London
Wandsworth Central	Greater London
Wanstead and Woodford	Greater London
Warrington	Lancashire
Warwick and Leamington	Warwickshire
Watford	Hertfordshire
Wednesbury	Staffordshire
Wellingborough	Northamptonshire
Wells	Somerset
Wembley North	Greater London
Wembley South	Greater London
West Bromwich	Staffordshire
Westbury	Wiltshire
Western Isles	Inverness-shire, Ross and Cromarty
Westhoughton	Lancashire
West Lothian	West Lothian
Westmorland	Westmorland
Weston-super-Mare	Somerset
Whitehaven	Cumberland
Widnes	Lancashire
Wigan	Lancashire
Willesden West	Greater London
Wimbledon	Greater London
Winchester	Hampshire
Windsor	Berkshire
Wirral	Cheshire
Woking	Surrey
Wokingham	Berkshire
Wolverhampton North East	Staffordshire
Wolverhampton South West	Staffordshire
Wood Green	Greater London
Woolwich East	Greater London
Woolwich West	Greater London
Worcester	Worcestershire
Worcestershire South	Worcestershire
Workington	Cumberland
Worthing	Sussex
The Wrekin	Shropshire
Wrexham	Denbighshire
Wycombe	Buckinghamshire
Yarmouth	Norfolk
Yeovil	Somerset
York	Yorkshire
