= List of MPs for constituencies in Scotland (1966–1970) =

- Colours on map indicate the party allegiance of each constituency's MP.

This is a list of the 71 members of Parliament (MPs) elected to the House of Commons of the United Kingdom by Scottish constituencies for the Forty-fourth parliament of the United Kingdom (1966–1970) at the 1966 United Kingdom general election.

== Composition ==
| Affiliation | Members |
|---|---|
| Labour Party | 46 |
| Conservative and Unionist | 20 |
| Liberal | 5 |

== Members ==
| Constituency | MP | Party | Notes |
|---|---|---|---|
| Aberdeen North | Hector Hughes | Labour Party | |
| Aberdeen South | Donald Dewar | Labour Party | |
| Argyll | Michael Noble | Unionist Party | |
| Ayr | George Younger | Conservative Party | |
| Banffshire | Wilfred Baker | Conservative Party | |
| Berwick and East Lothian | John Mackintosh | Labour Party | |
| Bothwell | James Hamilton | Labour Party | |
| Bute and North Ayrshire | Fitzroy Maclean | Unionist Party | |
| Caithness and Sutherland | Robert Maclennan | Labour Party | |
| Central Ayrshire | Archie Manuel | Labour Party | |
| Clackmannan and East Stirlingshire | Arthur Woodburn | Labour Party | |
| Coatbridge and Airdrie | James Dempsey | Labour Party | |
| Dumfriesshire | Hector Monro | Conservative Party | |
| Dundee East | George Thomson | Labour Party | |
| Dundee West | Peter Doig | Labour Party | |
| Dunfermline Burghs | Adam Hunter | Labour Party | |
| East Aberdeenshire | Patrick Wolrige-Gordon | Conservative Party | |
| East Dunbartonshire | Cyril Bence | Labour Party | |
| East Fife | John Gilmour | Unionist Party | |
| East Renfrewshire | Betty Harvie Anderson | Conservative Party | |
| Edinburgh Central | Thomas Oswald | Labour Party | |
| Edinburgh East | George Willis | Labour Party | |
| Edinburgh Leith | James Hoy | Labour Party | |
| Edinburgh North | Lord Dalkeith | Unionist Party | |
| Edinburgh Pentlands | Norman Wylie | Unionist Party | |
| Edinburgh South | Michael Clark Hutchison | Conservative Party | |
| Edinburgh West | Anthony Stodart | Unionist Party | |
| Galloway | John Brewis | Unionist Party | |
| Glasgow Bridgeton | James Bennett | Labour Party | |
| Glasgow Cathcart | Teddy Taylor | Unionist Party | |
| Glasgow Central | Thomas McLellan McMillan | Labour Party | |
| Glasgow Craigton | Bruce Millan | Labour Party | |
| Glasgow Gorbals | Alice Cullen | Labour Party | |
| Glasgow Govan | John Rankin | Labour Co-operative | |
| Glasgow Hillhead | Tam Galbraith | Conservative Party | |
| Glasgow Kelvingrove | Maurice Miller | Labour Party | |
| Glasgow Maryhill | Willie Hannan | Labour Party | |
| Glasgow Pollok | Alex Garrow | Labour Party | Died 1966 |
| Glasgow Pollok | Esmond Wright | Conservative Party | Elected in 1967 by-election |
| Glasgow Provan | Hugh Brown | Labour Party | |
| Glasgow Scotstoun | Willie Small | Labour Party | |
| Glasgow Shettleston | Myer Galpern | Labour Party | |
| Glasgow Springburn | Dick Buchanan | Labour Party | |
| Glasgow Woodside | Neil George Carmichael | Labour Party | Resigned 1967 |
| Greenock | Dickson Mabon | Labour Party | |
| Hamilton | Tom Fraser | Labour Party | |
| Hamilton | Winnie Ewing | Scottish National Party | Elected in 1967 by-election |
| Inverness | Russell Johnston | Liberal Party | |
| Kinross and Western Perthshire | Alec Douglas-Home | Conservative Party | |
| Kilmarnock | Willie Ross | Labour Party | |
| Kirkcaldy Burghs | Harry Gourlay | Labour Party | |
| Lanark | Judith Hart | Labour Party | |
| Midlothian | Alex Eadie | Labour Party | |
| Moray and Nairn | Gordon Campbell | Conservative Party | |
| Motherwell | George Lawson | Labour Party | |
| North Angus and Mearns | Alick Buchanan-Smith | Conservative Party | |
| North Lanarkshire | Peggy Herbison | Labour Party | |
| Orkney and Zetland | Jo Grimond | Liberal Party | |
| Paisley | John Robertson | Labour Party | |
| Perth and East Perthshire | Ian MacArthur | Unionist Party | |
| Ross and Cromarty | Alasdair Mackenzie | Liberal Party | |
| Roxburgh, Selkirk and Peebles | David Steel | Liberal Party | |
| Rutherglen | Gregor Mackenzie | Labour Party | |
| South Angus | Jock Bruce-Gardyne | Conservative Party | |
| South Ayrshire | Emrys Hughes | Labour Party | |
| Stirling and Falkirk Burghs | Malcolm MacPherson | Labour Party | |
| West Aberdeenshire | James Davidson | Liberal Party | |
| West Dunbartonshire | Tom Steele | Labour Party | |
| West Fife | Willie Hamilton | Labour Party | |
| West Lothian | Tam Dalyell | Labour Party | |
| West Renfrewshire | Norman Buchan | Labour Party | |
| West Stirlingshire | William Baxter | Labour Party | |
| Western Isles | Malcolm Macmillan | Labour Party | |

== See also ==
- Lists of MPs for constituencies in Scotland
