= List of MPs elected in the 1966 United Kingdom general election =

1966–1970 Parliament of the United Kingdom
←	1964–1966 Parliament	1970–February 1974 Parliament	→
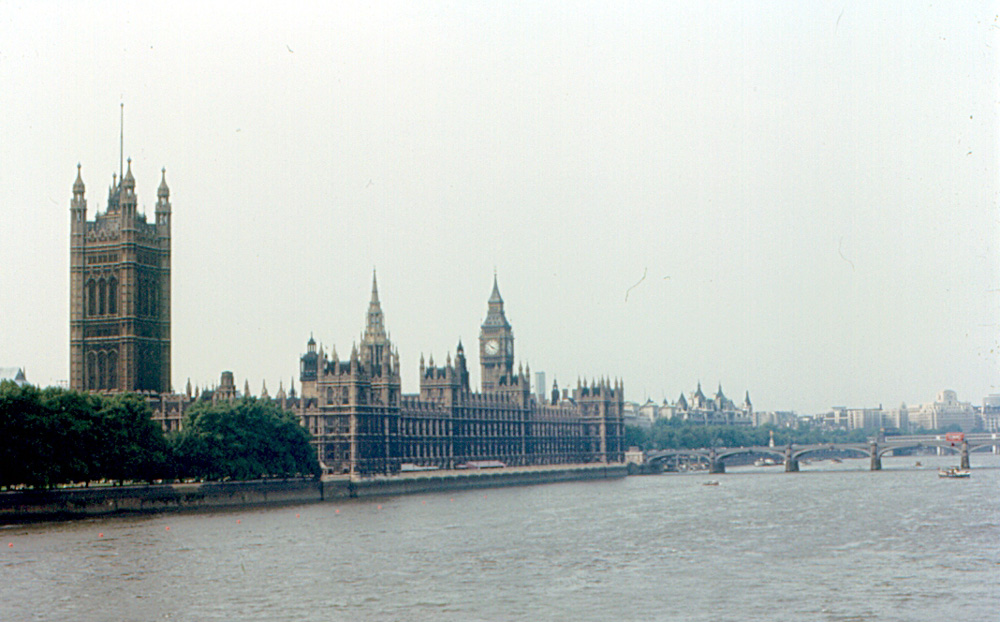
- Palace of Westminster in 1968

Overview
- Legislative body: Parliament of the United Kingdom
- Term: 31 March 1966 – 29 May 1970
- Election: 1966 United Kingdom general election
- Government: Second Wilson ministry

House of Commons
- Members: 630
- Speaker: Horace King
- Leader: Herbert Bowden; Richard Crossman; Fred Peart
- Prime Minister: Harold Wilson
- Leader of the Opposition: Edward Heath
- Third-party leader: Jo Grimond; Jeremy Thorpe

House of Lords
- Lord Chancellor: Baron Gardiner

Crown-in-Parliament Elizabeth II

Sessions
- 1st: 18 April 1966 – 27 October 1967
- 2nd: 31 October 1967 – 25 October 1968
- 3rd: 30 October 1968 – 22 October 1969
- 4th: 28 October 1969 – 29 May 1970

This is a list of members of Parliament elected at the 1966 United Kingdom general election, held on 31 March.

== By nation ==
- List of MPs for constituencies in Scotland (1966–1970)
- List of MPs for constituencies in Wales (1966–1970)

== Composition ==
These representative diagrams show the composition of the parties in the 1966 general election.

Note: This is not the official seating plan of the House of Commons, which has five rows of benches on each side, with the government party to the right of the speaker and opposition parties to the left, but with room for only around two-thirds of MPs to sit at any one time.

Affiliation	Members
Labour Party	364
Conservative Party	253
Liberal Party	12
Republican Labour Party	1
Total	630
Effective government majority	98

This is a list of members of Parliament elected to the Parliament of the United Kingdom at the 1966 general election, held on 31 March.

Notable newcomers to the House of Commons included David Owen, John Nott, Michael Heseltine, Jack Ashley, Donald Dewar, Gwyneth Dunwoody, John Pardoe, David Winnick, Gerry Fitt and Andrew Faulds.

Table of contents:

A B C D E F G H I J K L M N O P R S T U V W Y

== A ==
Constituency	MP	Party
Aberavon	John Morris	Labour
Aberdare	Arthur Probert	Labour
Aberdeen North	Hector Hughes	Labour
Aberdeen South	Donald Dewar	Labour
Aberdeenshire East	Patrick Wolrige-Gordon	Conservative
Aberdeenshire West	James Davidson	Liberal
Abertillery	Clifford Williams	Labour
Abingdon	Airey Neave	Conservative
Accrington	Arthur Davidson	Labour
Acton	Bernard Floud	Labour
Aldershot	Eric Errington	Conservative
Altrincham and Sale	Anthony Barber	Conservative
Anglesey	Cledwyn Hughes	Labour
Angus North and Mearns	Alick Buchanan-Smith	Conservative
Angus South	Jock Bruce-Gardyne	Conservative
Antrim North	Henry Clark	Ulster Unionist
Antrim South	Sir Knox Cunningham	Ulster Unionist
Argyll	Michael Noble	Conservative
Armagh	John Maginnis	Ulster Unionist
Arundel and Shoreham	Henry Kerby	Conservative
Ashfield	David Marquand	Labour
Ashford	Bill Deedes	Conservative
Ashton-under-Lyne	Robert Sheldon	Labour
Aylesbury	Spencer Summers	Conservative
Ayr	Hon. George Younger	Conservative
Ayrshire Central	Archie Manuel	Labour
Ayrshire North and Bute	Fitzroy Maclean	Conservative
Ayrshire South	Emrys Hughes	Labour
== B ==
Banbury	Neil Marten	Conservative
Banffshire	Wilfred Baker	Conservative
Barking	Tom Driberg	Labour
Barkston Ash	Michael Alison	Conservative
Barnet	Reginald Maudling	Conservative
Barnsley	Roy Mason	Labour
Barons Court	Ivor Richard	Labour
Barrow-in-Furness	Albert Booth	Labour
Barry	Raymond Gower	Conservative
Basingstoke	David Mitchell	Conservative
Bassetlaw	Fred Bellenger	Labour
Bath	Edward Brown	Conservative
Batley and Morley	Alfred Broughton	Labour
Battersea North	Douglas Jay	Labour
Battersea South	Ernest Perry	Labour
Bebington	Edwin Brooks	Labour
Beckenham	Philip Goodhart	Conservative
Bedford	Brian Parkyn	Labour
Bedfordshire, Mid	Stephen Hastings	Conservative
Bedfordshire South	Gwilym Roberts	Labour
Bedwellty	Harold Finch	Labour
Belfast East	Stanley McMaster	Ulster Unionist
Belfast North	Stratton Mills	Ulster Unionist
Belfast South	Rafton Pounder	Ulster Unionist
Belfast West	Gerry Fitt	Republican Labour
Belper	George Brown	Labour
Bermondsey	Bob Mellish	Labour
Berwick and East Lothian	John Mackintosh	Labour
Berwick upon Tweed	Antony Lambton	Conservative
Bethnal Green	William Hilton	Labour Co-operative
Bexley	Edward Heath	Conservative
Billericay	Eric Moonman	Labour
Bilston	Robert Edwards	Labour Co-operative
Birkenhead	Edmund Dell	Labour
Birmingham All Saints	Brian Walden	Labour
Birmingham Aston	Julius Silverman	Labour
Birmingham Edgbaston	Jill Knight	Conservative
Birmingham Hall Green	Reginald Eyre	Conservative
Birmingham Handsworth	Sir Edward Boyle, Bt.	Conservative
Birmingham Ladywood	Victor Yates	Labour
Birmingham Northfield	Donald Chapman	Labour
Birmingham Perry Barr	Christopher Price	Labour
Birmingham Selly Oak	Harold Gurden	Conservative
Birmingham Small Heath	Denis Howell	Labour
Birmingham Sparkbrook	Roy Hattersley	Labour
Birmingham Stechford	Roy Jenkins	Labour
Birmingham Yardley	Ioan Evans	Labour Co-operative
Bishop Auckland	James Boyden	Labour
Blackburn	Barbara Castle	Labour
Blackpool North	Norman Miscampbell	Conservative
Blackpool South	Peter Blaker	Conservative
Blaydon	Robert Woof	Labour
Blyth	Eddie Milne	Labour
Bodmin	Peter Bessell	Liberal
Bolsover	Harold Neal	Labour
Bolton East	Robert Howarth	Labour
Bolton West	Gordon Oakes	Labour
Bootle	Simon Mahon	Labour
Bosworth	Woodrow Wyatt	Labour
Bothwell	James Hamilton	Labour
Bournemouth East and Christchurch	John Cordle	Conservative
Bournemouth West	John Eden	Conservative
Bradford East	Edward Lyons	Labour
Bradford North	Ben Ford	Labour
Bradford South	George Craddock	Labour
Bradford West	Norman Haseldine	Labour Co-operative
Brecon and Radnor	Tudor Watkins	Labour
Brentford and Chiswick	Michael Barnes	Labour
Bridgwater	Gerald Wills	Conservative
Bridlington	Richard Wood	Conservative
Brierley Hill	J. E. Talbot	Conservative
Brigg	Lance Mallalieu	Labour
Brighouse and Spenborough	Colin Jackson	Labour
Brighton Kemptown	Dennis Hobden	Labour
Brighton Pavilion	Sir William Teeling	Conservative
Bristol Central	Arthur Palmer	Labour Co-operative
Bristol North East	Raymond Dobson	Labour
Bristol North West	John Ellis	Labour
Bristol South (UK Parliament constituency)	William A. Wilkins	Labour
Bristol South East	Tony Benn	Labour
Bristol West (UK Parliament constituency)	Robert Cooke	Conservative
Brixton	Marcus Lipton	Labour
Bromley	John Hunt	Conservative
Bromsgrove	James Dance	Conservative
Buckingham	Robert Maxwell	Labour
Buckinghamshire South	Ronald Bell	Conservative
Burnley	Daniel Jones	Labour
Burton	John Jennings	Conservative
Bury and Radcliffe	David Ensor	Labour
Bury St Edmunds	Eldon Griffiths	Conservative
== C ==
Caernarfon	Goronwy Roberts	Labour
Caerphilly	Ness Edwards	Labour
Caithness and Sutherland	Bob Maclennan	Labour
Cambridge	Robert Davies	Labour
Cambridgeshire	Francis Pym	Conservative
Cannock	Jennie Lee	Labour
Canterbury	David Crouch	Conservative
Cardiff North	Edward Rowlands	Labour
Cardiff South East	James Callaghan	Labour
Cardiff West	George Thomas	Labour
Cardiganshire	Elystan Morgan	Labour
Carlisle	Ronald Lewis	Labour
Carlton	Philip Holland	Conservative
Carmarthen	Lady Megan Lloyd George	Labour
Carshalton	Walter Elliot	Conservative
Cheadle	Michael Winstanley	Liberal
Chelmsford	Norman St John-Stevas	Conservative
Chelsea	Marcus Worsley	Conservative
Cheltenham	Douglas Dodds-Parker	Conservative
Chertsey	Lionel Heald	Conservative
Chester, City of	John Temple	Conservative
Chesterfield	Eric Varley	Labour
Chester-le-Street	Norman Pentland	Labour
Chichester	Walter Loveys	Conservative
Chigwell	John Biggs-Davison	Conservative
Chippenham	Daniel Awdry	Conservative
Chislehurst	Alistair Macdonald	Labour
Chorley	Clifford Kenyon	Labour
Cirencester and Tewkesbury	Nicholas Ridley	Conservative
Cities of London and Westminster	Sir John Smith	Conservative
Clapham	Margaret McKay	Labour
Cleveland	James Tinn	Labour
Clitheroe	Sir Francis Pearson	Conservative
Coatbridge and Airdrie	James Dempsey	Labour
Colchester	Antony Buck	Conservative
Colne Valley	Richard Wainwright	Liberal
Consett	David Watkins	Labour
Conway	Ednyfed Hudson Davies	Labour
Cornwall, North	John Pardoe	Liberal
Coventry East	Richard Crossman	Labour
Coventry North	Maurice Edelman	Labour
Coventry South	William Wilson	Labour
Crewe	Scholefield Allen	Labour
Crosby	Graham Page	Conservative
Croydon North-East	Bernard Weatherill	Conservative
Croydon North-West	Fred Harris	Conservative
Croydon South	David Winnick	Labour
== D ==
Dagenham	John Parker	Labour
Darlington	Edward Fletcher	Labour
Dartford	Sydney Irving	Labour Co-operative
Darwen	Charles Fletcher-Cooke	Conservative
Dearne Valley	Edwin Wainwright	Labour
Denbigh	Geraint Morgan	Conservative
Deptford	Hon. John Silkin	Labour
Derby North	Niall MacDermot	Labour
Derby South	Philip Noel-Baker	Labour
Derbyshire North East	Tom Swain	Labour
Derbyshire South East	Trevor Park	Labour
Derbyshire West	Aidan Crawley	Conservative
Devizes	Hon. Charles Morrison	Conservative
Devon, North	Jeremy Thorpe	Liberal
Dewsbury	David Ginsburg	Labour
Don Valley	Richard Kelley	Labour
Doncaster	Harold Walker	Labour
Dorking	George Sinclair	Conservative
Dorset North	Sir Richard Glyn	Conservative
Dorset South	Evelyn King	Conservative
Dorset West	Simon Wingfield Digby	Conservative
Dover	David Ennals	Labour
Down North	George Currie	Ulster Unionist
Down South	Lawrence Orr	Ulster Unionist
Dudley	George Wigg	Labour
Dulwich	Hon. Samuel Silkin	Labour
Dumfries	Hector Monro	Conservative
Dunbartonshire East	Cyril Bence	Labour
Dunbartonshire West	Tom Steele	Labour
Dundee East	George Thomson	Labour
Dundee West	Peter Doig	Labour
Dunfermline Burghs	Adam Hunter	Labour
Durham	Charles Grey	Labour
Durham North West	Ernest Armstrong	Labour
== E ==
Ealing North	William Molloy	Labour
Ealing South	Brian Batsford	Conservative
Easington	Manny Shinwell	Labour
East Grinstead	Geoffrey Johnson-Smith	Conservative
East Ham North	Reg Prentice	Labour
East Ham South	Albert Oram	Labour
Eastbourne	Charles Taylor	Conservative
Eastleigh	David Price	Conservative
Ebbw Vale	Michael Foot	Labour
Eccles	Lewis Carter-Jones	Labour
Edinburgh Central	Thomas Oswald	Labour
Edinburgh East	George Willis	Labour
Edinburgh Leith	James Hoy	Labour
Edinburgh North	Walter Scott	Conservative
Edinburgh Pentlands	Norman Wylie	Conservative
Edinburgh South	Michael Hutchison	Conservative
Edinburgh West	Anthony Stodart	Conservative
Edmonton	Austen Albu	Labour
Enfield East	John Mackie	Labour
Enfield West	Iain Macleod	Conservative
Epping	Stanley Newens	Labour
Epsom	Peter Rawlinson	Conservative
Erith and Crayford	James Wellbeloved	Labour
Esher	William Robson Brown	Conservative
Essex South East	Bernard Braine	Conservative
Eton and Slough	Joan Lestor	Labour
Exeter	Gwyneth Dunwoody	Labour
Eye	Harwood Harrison	Conservative
== F ==
Falmouth and Camborne	John Dunwoody	Labour
Farnham	Maurice Macmillan	Conservative
Farnworth	Ernest Thornton	Labour
Faversham	Terence Boston	Labour
Feltham	Russell Kerr	Labour
Fermanagh and South Tyrone	James Hamilton	Ulster Unionist
Fife East	Sir John Gilmour, Bt.	Conservative
Fife West	Willie Hamilton	Labour
Finchley	Margaret Thatcher	Conservative
Flint East	Eirene White	Labour
Flint West	Nigel Birch	Conservative
Folkestone and Hythe	Albert Costain	Conservative
Fulham	Michael Stewart	Labour
Fylde North	Walter Clegg	Conservative
Fylde South	Claude Lancaster	Conservative
== G ==
Gainsborough	Marcus Kimball	Conservative
Galloway	John Brewis	Conservative
Gateshead East	Bernard Conlan	Labour
Gateshead West	Harry Randall	Labour
Gillingham	Frederick Burden	Conservative
Glasgow Bridgeton	James Bennett	Labour
Glasgow Cathcart	Teddy Taylor	Conservative
Glasgow Central	Thomas McMillan	Labour
Glasgow Craigton	Bruce Millan	Labour
Glasgow Gorbals	Alice Cullen	Labour
Glasgow Govan	John Rankin	Labour Co-op
Glasgow Hillhead	Tam Galbraith	Conservative
Glasgow Kelvingrove	Maurice Miller	Labour
Glasgow Maryhill	William Hannan	Labour
Glasgow Pollok	Alex Garrow	Labour
Glasgow Provan	Hugh Brown	Labour
Glasgow Scotstoun	William Small	Labour
Glasgow Shettleston	Myer Galpern	Labour
Glasgow Springburn	Richard Buchanan	Labour
Glasgow Woodside	Neil Carmichael	Labour
Gloucester	Jack Diamond	Labour
Gloucestershire South	Frederick Corfield	Conservative
Gloucestershire West	Charles Loughlin	Labour
Goole	George Jeger	Labour
Gosport and Fareham	Reginald Bennett	Conservative
Gower	Ifor Davies	Labour
Grantham	Joseph Godber	Conservative
Gravesend	Albert Murray	Labour
Greenock	Dickson Mabon	Labour Co-op
Greenwich	Richard Marsh	Labour
Grimsby	Anthony Crosland	Labour
Guildford	David Howell	Conservative
== H ==
Hackney Central	Herbert Butler	Labour
Hackney North and Stoke Newington	David Weitzman	Labour
Halifax	Shirley Summerskill	Labour
Haltemprice	Patrick Wall	Conservative
Hamilton	Thomas Fraser	Labour
Hammersmith North	Frank Tomney	Labour
Hampstead	Benjamin Whitaker	Labour
Harborough	John Farr	Conservative
Harrogate	James Ramsden	Conservative
Harrow Central	Anthony Grant	Conservative
Harrow East	Roy Roebuck	Labour
Harrow West	John Page	Conservative
The Hartlepools	Edward Leadbitter	Labour
Harwich	Julian Ridsdale	Conservative and Nat Lib
Hastings	Neill Cooper-Key	Conservative
Hayes and Harlington	Arthur Skeffington	Labour
Hemel Hempstead	James Allason	Conservative
Hemsworth	Alan Beaney	Labour
Hendon North	Ian Orr-Ewing	Conservative
Hendon South	Sir Hugh Lucas-Tooth	Conservative
Henley	John Hay	Conservative
Hereford	David Gibson-Watt	Conservative
Hertford	Lord Balniel	Conservative
Hertfordshire East	Derek Walker-Smith	Conservative
Hertfordshire South West	Gilbert Longden	Conservative
Heston and Isleworth	Reader Harris	Conservative
Hexham	Geoffrey Rippon	Conservative
Heywood and Royton	Joel Barnett	Labour
High Peak	Peter Jackson	Labour
Hitchin	Shirley Williams	Labour
Holborn and St Pancras South	Lena Jeger	Labour
Holland with Boston	Richard Body	Conservative
Honiton	Robert Mathew	Conservative
Horncastle	Peter Tapsell	Conservative
Hornchurch	Alan Lee Williams	Labour
Hornsey	Hugh Rossi	Conservative
Horsham	Peter Hordern	Conservative
Houghton-le-Spring	Tom Urwin	Labour
Hove	Martin Maddan	Conservative
Howden	Paul Bryan	Conservative
Huddersfield East	Joseph Mallalieu	Labour
Huddersfield West	Kenneth Lomas	Labour
Huntingdonshire	David Renton	Conservative and Nat Lib
Huyton	Harold Wilson	Labour
== I ==
Ilford North	Tom Iremonger	Conservative
Ilford South	Arnold Shaw	Labour
Ilkeston	Raymond Fletcher	Labour
Ince	Michael McGuire	Labour
Inverness	Russell Johnston	Liberal
Ipswich	Dingle Foot	Labour
Isle of Ely	Harry Legge-Bourke	Conservative
Isle of Thanet	William Rees-Davies	Conservative
Isle of Wight	Mark Woodnutt	Conservative
Islington East	Eric Fletcher	Labour
Islington North	Gerald Reynolds	Labour
Islington South West	Albert Evans	Labour
== J ==
Jarrow	Ernest Fernyhough	Labour
== K ==
Keighley	John Binns	Labour
Kensington North	George Rogers	Labour
Kensington South	William Roots	Conservative
Kettering	Geoffrey de Freitas	Labour
Kidderminster	Tatton Brinton	Conservative
Kilmarnock	William Ross	Labour
King's Lynn	Derek Page	Labour
Kingston upon Hull East	Harry Pursey	Labour
Kingston upon Hull North	Kevin McNamara	Labour
Kingston upon Hull West	James Johnson	Labour
Kingston-upon-Thames	John Boyd-Carpenter	Conservative
Kinross and West Perthshire	Alec Douglas-Home	Conservative
Kirkcaldy Burghs	Harry Gourlay	Labour
Knutsford	Walter Bromley-Davenport	Conservative
== L ==
Lanark	Judith Hart	Labour
Lancaster	Stanley Henig	Labour
Leeds East	Denis Healey	Labour
Leeds North East	Keith Joseph	Conservative
Leeds North West	Donald Kaberry	Conservative
Leeds South	Merlyn Rees	Labour
Leeds South East	Alice Bacon	Labour
Leeds West	Charles Pannell	Labour
Leek	Harold Davies	Labour
Leicester North East	Tom Bradley	Labour
Leicester North West	Barnett Janner	Labour
Leicester South East	John Peel	Conservative
Leicester South West	Herbert Bowden	Labour
Leigh	Harold Boardman	Labour
Leominster	Clive Bossom	Conservative
Lewes	Tufton Beamish	Conservative
Lewisham North	Roland Moyle	Labour
Lewisham South	Carol Johnson	Labour
Lewisham West	James Dickens	Labour
Leyton	Patrick Gordon-Walker	Labour
Lichfield and Tamworth	Julian Snow	Labour
Lincoln	Dick Taverne	Labour
Liverpool Edge Hill	Arthur Irvine	Labour
Liverpool Exchange	Bessie Braddock	Labour
Liverpool Garston	Tim Fortescue	Conservative
Liverpool Kirkdale	James Dunn	Labour
Liverpool Scotland	Walter Alldritt	Labour
Liverpool Toxteth	Richard Crawshaw	Labour
Liverpool Walton	Eric Heffer	Labour
Liverpool Wavertree	John Tilney	Conservative
Liverpool West Derby	Eric Ogden	Labour
Llanelli	Jim Griffiths	Labour
Londonderry	Robin Chichester-Clark	Ulster Unionist
Loughborough	John Cronin	Labour
Louth	Sir Cyril Osborne	Conservative
Lowestoft	Jim Prior	Conservative
Ludlow	Jasper More	Conservative
Luton	William Howie	Labour
== M ==
Macclesfield	Sir Arthur Vere Harvey	Conservative
Maidstone	John Wells	Conservative
Maldon	Alastair Harrison	Conservative
Manchester Ardwick	Leslie Lever	Labour
Manchester Blackley	Paul Rose	Labour
Manchester Cheetham	Harold Lever	Labour
Manchester Exchange	William Griffiths	Labour
Manchester Gorton	Konni Zilliacus	Labour
Manchester Moss Side	Frank Taylor	Conservative
Manchester Openshaw	Charles Morris	Labour
Manchester Withington	Sir Robert Cary, Bt.	Conservative
Manchester Wythenshawe	Alf Morris	Labour Co-operative
Mansfield	Don Concannon	Labour
Melton	Mervyn Pike	Conservative
Meriden	Christopher Rowland	Labour
Merioneth	William Edwards	Labour
Merthyr Tydfil	S.O. Davies	Labour
Merton and Morden	Humphrey Atkins	Conservative
Middlesbrough East	Arthur Bottomley	Labour
Middlesbrough West	Jeremy Bray	Labour
Middleton and Prestwich	Denis Coe	Labour
Midlothian	Alex Eadie	Labour
Mitcham	Robert Carr	Conservative
Monmouth	Donald Anderson	Labour
Montgomery	Emlyn Hooson	Liberal
Moray and Nairn	Gordon Campbell	Conservative
Morecambe and Lonsdale	Alfred Hall-Davis	Conservative
Morpeth	Will Owen	Labour Co-operative
Motherwell	George Lawson	Labour
== N ==
Nantwich	Robert Grant-Ferris	Conservative
Neath	Donald Coleman	Labour
Nelson and Colne	Sydney Silverman	Labour
New Forest	Oliver Crosthwaite-Eyre	Conservative
Newark	Edward Bishop	Labour
Newbury	Hon. John Astor	Conservative
Newcastle-under-Lyme	Stephen Swingler	Labour
Newcastle upon Tyne Central	Ted Short	Labour
Newcastle upon Tyne East	Geoffrey Rhodes	Labour Co-operative
Newcastle upon Tyne North	William Elliott	Conservative
Newcastle upon Tyne West	Robert Brown	Labour
Newport	Roy Hughes	Labour
Newton	Frederick Lee	Labour
Norfolk, Central	Ian Gilmour	Conservative
Norfolk, North	Bert Hazell	Labour
Norfolk, South	John Hill	Conservative
Norfolk, South West	Paul Hawkins	Conservative
Normanton	Albert Roberts	Labour
Northampton	Reginald Paget	Labour
Northamptonshire South	Arthur Jones	Conservative
North Lanarkshire	Margaret Herbison	Labour
Northwich	John Foster	Conservative
Norwich North	George Wallace	Labour
Norwich South	Christopher Norwood	Labour
Norwood	John Fraser	Labour
Nottingham Central	Jack Dunnett	Labour
Nottingham North	William Whitlock	Labour
Nottingham South	George Perry	Labour
Nottingham West	Michael English	Labour
Nuneaton	Frank Cousins	Labour
== O ==
Ogmore	Walter Padley	Labour
Oldbury and Halesowen	John Horner	Labour
Oldham East	Charles Mapp	Labour
Oldham West	Leslie Hale	Labour
Orkney and Shetland	Jo Grimond	Liberal
Ormskirk	Douglas Glover	Conservative
Orpington	Eric Lubbock	Liberal
Oswestry	John Biffen	Conservative
Oxford	Evan Luard	Labour
== P ==
Paddington North	Ben Parkin	Labour
Paddington South	Nicholas Scott	Conservative
Paisley	John Robertson	Labour
Peckham	Freda Corbet	Labour
Pembrokeshire	Desmond Donnelly	Labour
Penistone	John Mendelson	Labour
Penrith and the Border	William Whitelaw	Conservative
Perth and East Perthshire	Ian MacArthur	Conservative
Peterborough	Harmar Nicholls	Conservative
Petersfield	Joan Quennell	Conservative
Plymouth Devonport	Joan Vickers	Conservative
Plymouth Sutton	David Owen	Labour
Pontefract	Joseph Harper	Labour
Pontypool	Leo Abse	Labour
Pontypridd	Arthur Pearson	Labour
Poole	Oscar Murton	Conservative
Poplar	Ian Mikardo	Labour
Portsmouth Langstone	Ian Lloyd	Conservative
Portsmouth South	Bonner Pink	Conservative
Portsmouth West	Frank Judd	Labour
Preston North	Ronald Atkins	Labour
Preston South	Peter Mahon	Labour
Pudsey	Joseph Hiley	Conservative
Putney	Hugh Jenkins	Labour
== R ==
Reading	John Lee	Labour
Reigate	John Vaughan-Morgan	Conservative
Renfrewshire East	Betty Harvie Anderson	Conservative
Renfrewshire West	Norman Buchan	Labour
Rhondda East	Elfed Davies	Labour
Rhondda West	Iorwerth Thomas	Labour
Richmond (Surrey)	Anthony Royle	Conservative
Richmond (Yorks)	Timothy Kitson	Conservative
Ripon	Malcolm Stoddart-Scott	Conservative
Rochdale	Jack McCann	Labour
Rochester and Chatham	Anne Kerr	Labour
Romford	Ron Ledger	Labour Co-operative
Ross and Cromarty	Alasdair Mackenzie	Liberal
Rossendale	Tony Greenwood	Labour
Rother Valley	David Griffiths	Labour
Rotherham	Brian O'Malley	Labour
Rowley Regis and Tipton	Peter Archer	Labour
Roxburgh, Selkirk and Peebles	David Steel	Liberal
Rugby	William Price	Labour
Ruislip-Northwood	Petre Crowder	Conservative
Runcorn	Mark Carlisle	Conservative
Rushcliffe	Antony Gardner	Labour
Rutherglen	Gregor Mackenzie	Labour
Rutland and Stamford	Kenneth Lewis	Conservative
Rye	Godman Irvine	Conservative
== S ==
Saffron Walden	Peter Kirk	Conservative
St Albans	Victor Goodhew	Conservative
St Helens	Leslie Spriggs	Labour
St Ives	John Nott	Nat Lib and Conservative
St Marylebone	Quintin Hogg	Conservative
St Pancras North	Kenneth Robinson	Labour
Salford East	Frank Allaun	Labour
Salford West	Stanley Orme	Labour
Salisbury	Michael Hamilton	Conservative
Scarborough and Whitby	Michael Shaw	Conservative
Sedgefield	Joseph Slater	Labour
Sevenoaks	John Rodgers	Conservative
Sheffield Attercliffe	John Hynd	Labour
Sheffield Brightside	Richard Winterbottom	Labour
Sheffield Hallam	John Osborn	Conservative
Sheffield Heeley	Frank Hooley	Labour
Sheffield Hillsborough	George Darling	Labour Co-operative
Sheffield Park	Frederick Mulley	Labour
Shipley	Geoffrey Hirst	Conservative
Shoreditch and Finsbury	Ronald Brown	Labour
Shrewsbury	John Langford-Holt	Conservative
Skipton	Burnaby Drayson	Conservative
Smethwick	Andrew Faulds	Labour
Solihull	Percy Grieve	Conservative
Somerset North	Paul Dean	Conservative
South Shields	Arthur Blenkinsop	Labour
Southall	Sydney Bidwell	Labour
Southampton Itchen	Horace King	Speaker
Southampton Test	Bob Mitchell	Labour
Southend East	Stephen McAdden	Conservative
Southend West	Paul Channon	Conservative
Southgate	Hon. Anthony Berry	Conservative
Southport	Ian Percival	Conservative
Southwark	Raymond Gunter	Labour
Sowerby	Douglas Houghton	Labour
Spelthorne	Sir Beresford Craddock	Conservative
Stafford and Stone	Hon. Hugh Fraser	Conservative
Stalybridge and Hyde	Fred Blackburn	Labour
Stepney	Peter Shore	Labour
Stirling and Falkirk	Malcolm MacPherson	Labour
Stirlingshire East and Clackmannan	Arthur Woodburn	Labour
Stirlingshire West	William Baxter	Labour
Stockport North	Arnold Gregory	Labour
Stockport South	Maurice Orbach	Labour
Stockton-on-Tees	Bill Rodgers	Labour
Stoke-on-Trent Central	Robert Cant	Labour
Stoke-on-Trent North	John Forrester	Labour
Stoke-on-Trent South	Jack Ashley	Labour
Stratford-on-Avon	Angus Maude	Conservative
Streatham	Duncan Sandys	Conservative
Stretford	Ernest Davies	Labour
Stroud	Anthony Kershaw	Conservative
Sudbury and Woodbridge	Keith Stainton	Conservative
Sunderland North	Frederick Willey	Labour
Sunderland South	Gordon Bagier	Labour
Surbiton	Nigel Fisher	Conservative
Surrey East	Charles Doughty	Conservative
Sutton and Cheam	Richard Sharples	Conservative
Sutton Coldfield	Geoffrey Lloyd	Conservative
Swansea East	Neil McBride	Labour
Swansea West	Alan Williams	Labour
Swindon	Francis Noel-Baker	Labour
== T ==
Taunton	Edward du Cann	Conservative
Tavistock	Michael Heseltine	Conservative
The Wrekin	Gerald Fowler	Labour
Thirsk and Malton	Robin Turton	Conservative
Thurrock	Hugh Delargy	Labour
Tiverton	Robin Maxwell-Hyslop	Conservative
Tonbridge	Richard Hornby	Conservative
Torquay	Frederic Bennett	Conservative
Torrington	Peter Mills	Conservative
Totnes	Ray Mawby	Conservative
Tottenham	Norman Atkinson	Labour
Truro	Geoffrey Wilson	Conservative
Twickenham	Gresham Cooke	Conservative
Tynemouth	Irene Ward	Conservative
== U ==
Ulster, Mid	George Forrest	Ulster Unionist
Uxbridge	John Ryan	Labour
== V ==
Vauxhall	George Strauss	Labour
== W ==
Wakefield	Walter Harrison	Labour
Wallasey	Ernest Marples	Conservative
Wallsend	Ted Garrett	Labour
Walsall North	William Wells	Labour
Walsall South	Henry d'Avigdor-Goldsmid	Conservative
Walthamstow East	William Robinson	Labour
Walthamstow West	Edward Redhead	Labour
Wandsworth Central	David Kerr	Labour
Wanstead and Woodford	Patrick Jenkin	Conservative
Warrington	Thomas Williams	Labour Co-operative
Warwick and Leamington	John Hobson	Conservative
Watford	Raphael Tuck	Labour
Wednesbury	John Stonehouse	Labour Co-operative
Wellingborough	Harry Howarth	Labour
Wells	Lynch Maydon	Conservative
Wembley North	Eric Bullus	Conservative
Wembley South	Ronald Russell	Conservative
West Bromwich	Maurice Foley	Labour
West Ham North	Arthur Lewis	Labour
West Ham South	Elwyn Jones	Labour
West Lothian	Tam Dalyell	Labour
Westbury	Dennis Walters	Conservative
Western Isles	Malcolm Macmillan	Labour
Westhoughton	Tom Price	Labour
Westmorland	Michael Jopling	Conservative
Weston-super-Mare	David Webster	Conservative
Whitehaven	Joseph Symonds	Labour
Widnes	James MacColl	Labour
Wigan	Alan Fitch	Labour
Willesden East	Reginald Freeson	Labour
Willesden West	Laurence Pavitt	Labour Co-operative
Wimbledon	Cyril Black	Conservative
Winchester	Morgan Morgan-Giles	Conservative
Windsor	Charles Mott-Radclyffe	Conservative
Wirral	Selwyn Lloyd	Conservative
Woking	Cranley Onslow	Conservative
Wokingham	William van Straubenzee	Conservative
Wolverhampton North East	Renee Short	Labour
Wolverhampton South West	Enoch Powell	Conservative
Wood Green	Joyce Butler	Labour Co-operative
Woolwich East	Christopher Mayhew	Labour
Woolwich West	William Hamling	Labour
Worcester	Peter Walker	Conservative
Worcestershire, South	Gerald Nabarro	Conservative
Workington	Fred Peart	Labour
Worthing	Terence Higgins	Conservative
Wrexham	James Idwal Jones	Labour
Wycombe	John Hall	Conservative
== Y ==
Yarmouth	Hugh Gray	Labour
Yeovil	John Peyton	Conservative
York	Alex Lyon	Labour

== By-elections ==
See the list of United Kingdom by-elections.

== See also ==
- List of parliaments of the United Kingdom
- UK general election, 1966
- List of United Kingdom by-elections
