= List of MPs for constituencies in Wales (1966–1970) =

This is a list of members of Parliament (MPs) elected to the House of Commons of the United Kingdom by Welsh constituencies for the Forty-Fourth Parliament of the United Kingdom (1966–1970).

Most MPs elected for Welsh constituencies at the 1966 United Kingdom general election, held on 31 March 1966, served a full term but there were three by-elections.

The list is sorted by the name of the MP.

== Composition ==
Affiliation	Members
Welsh Labour Party	32
Welsh Conservative Party	3
Welsh Liberal Party	1
Total	36

== MPs ==
MP	Constituency	Party	In constituency since
Leo Abse	Pontypool	Labour Party	1958 by-election
Donald Anderson	Monmouth	Labour Party	1966
Nigel Birch	West Flintshire	Conservative Party	1950
James Callaghan	Cardiff South East	Labour Party	1945
Donald Coleman	Neath	Labour Party	1964
Elfed Davies	Rhondda East	Labour Party	1959
Ifor Davies	Gower	Labour Party	1959
S. O. Davies	Merthyr Tydfil	Labour Party	1934 by-election
Desmond Donnelly	Pembrokeshire	Labour Party	1950
Ness Edwards	Caerphilly	Labour Party	1939 by-election
Will Edwards	Merioneth	Labour Party	1966
Harold Finch	Bedwellty	Labour Party	1950
Michael Foot	Ebbw Vale	Labour Party	1960 by-election
Raymond Gower	Barry	Conservative Party	1951
Jim Griffiths	Llanelli	Labour Party	1936 by-election
Emlyn Hooson	Montgomery	Liberal Party	1962 by-election
Ednyfed Hudson Davies	Conwy	Labour Party	1966
Cledwyn Hughes	Anglesey	Labour Party	1951
Roy Hughes	Newport	Labour Party	1966
Idwal Jones	Wrexham	Labour Party	1955
Megan Lloyd George	Carmarthen	Labour Party	1957 by-election
Neil McBride	Swansea East	Labour Party	1963 by-election
Elystan Morgan	Cardiganshire	Labour Party	1966
Geraint Morgan	Denbigh	Conservative Party	1959
John Morris	Abervaon	Labour Party	1959
Walter Padley	Ogmore	Labour Party	1950
Arthur Pearson	Pontypridd	Labour Party	1938 by-election
Arthur Probert	Aberdare	Labour Party	1954 by-election
Goronwy Roberts	Caernarfon	Labour Party	1950
Ted Rowlands	Cardiff North	Labour Party	1966
George Thomas	Cardiff West	Labour Party	1945
Iorwerth Thomas	Rhondda West	Labour Party	1950
Tudor Watkins	Brecon and Radnor	Labour Party	1945
Alan J. Williams	Swansea West	Labour Party	1964
Clifford Williams	Abertillery	Labour Party	1965 by-election
Eirene White	East Flintshire	Labour Party	1950

== By-elections ==
There were three by-elections during this period:

- 1966 Carmarthen by-election won by Gwynfor Evans, the first ever Plaid Cymru Member of Parliament
- 1967 Rhondda West by-election won by Labour candidate Alec Jones
- 1968 Caerphilly by-election won by Labour candidate Alfred Evans

== See also ==
- 1966 United Kingdom general election
