= 1965 Conservative Party leadership election =

British Conservative Party leadership election

27 July 1965	1975 →
- Registered: 303
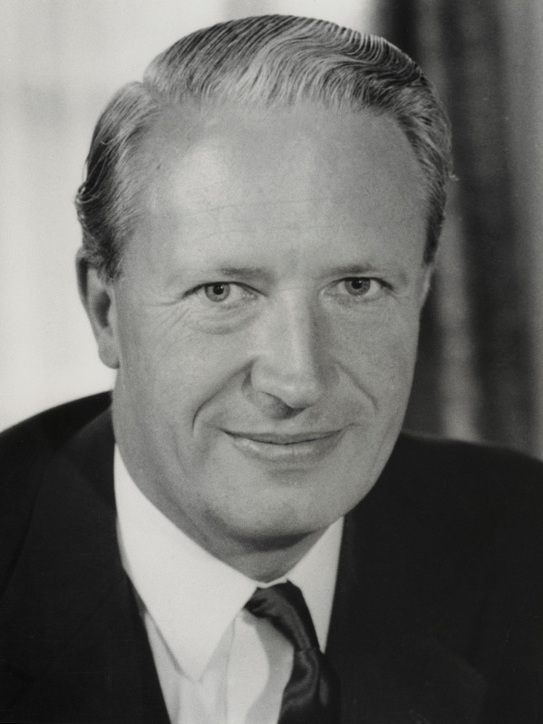

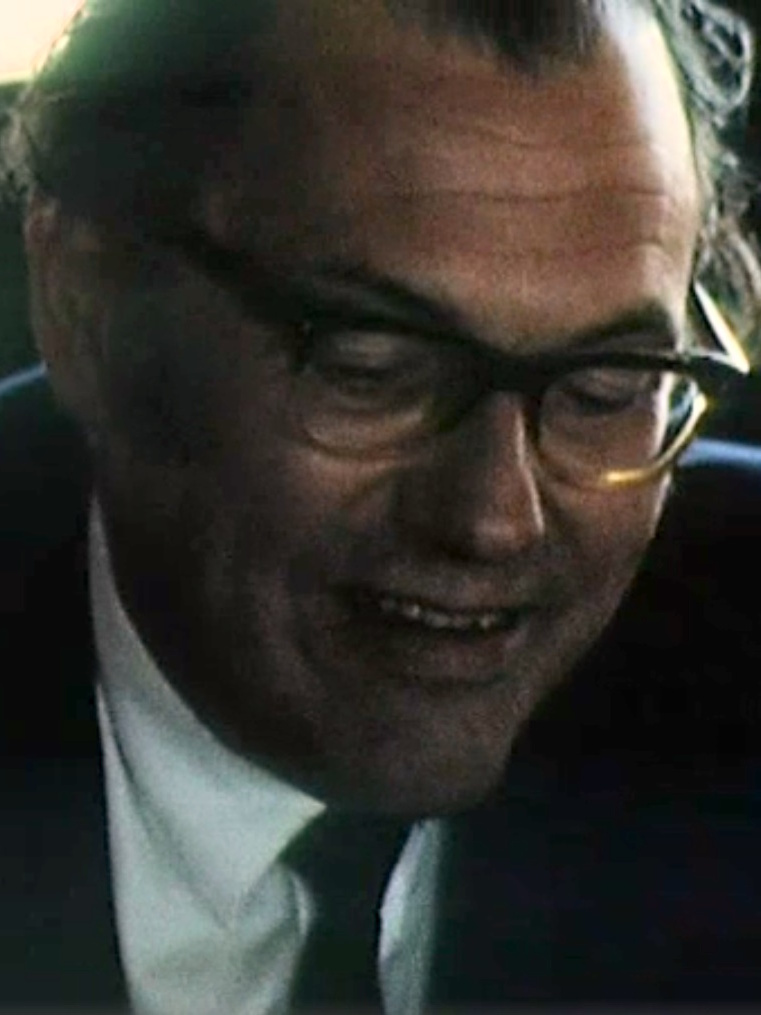

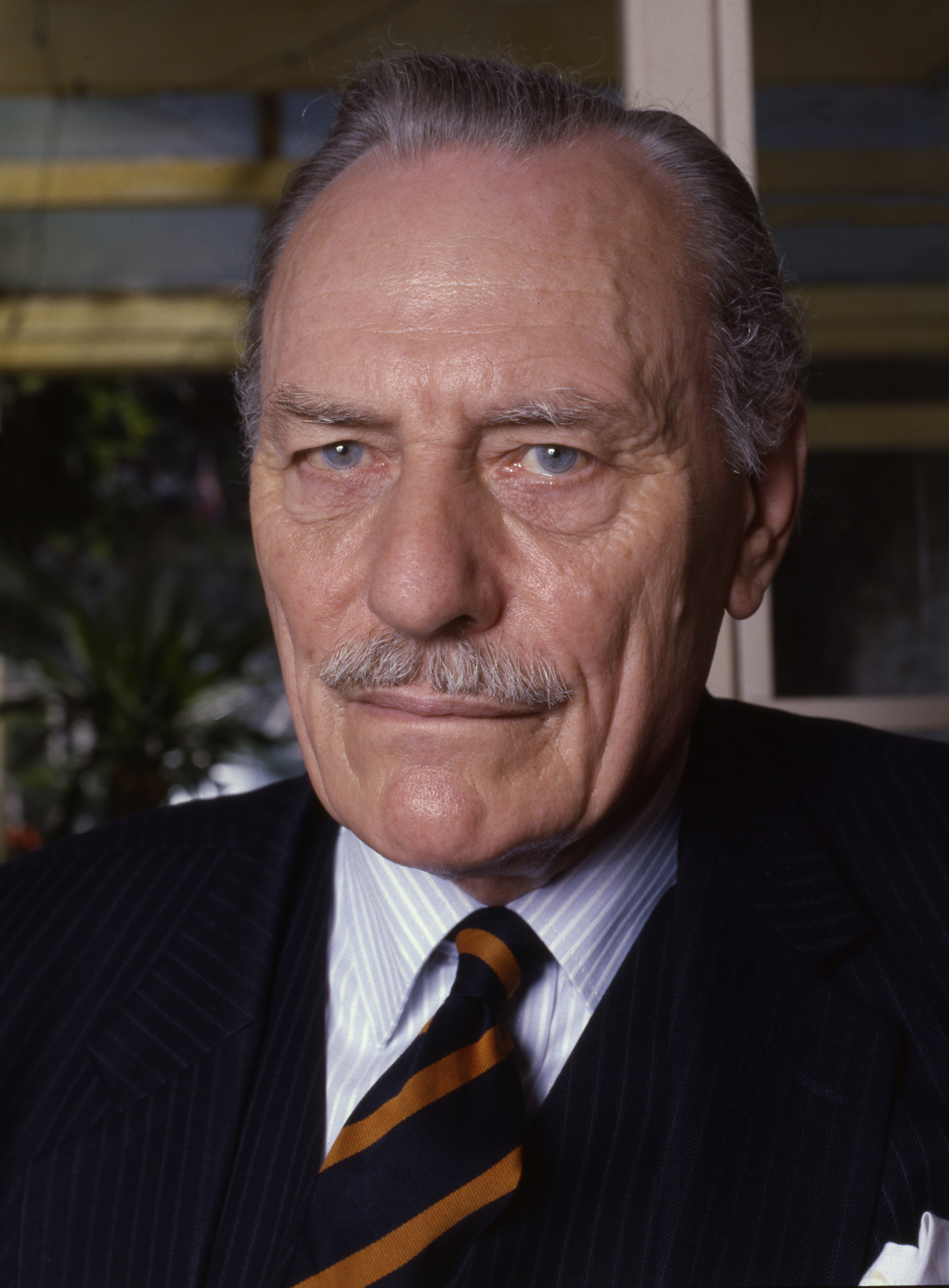
Candidate	Edward Heath	Reginald Maudling	Enoch Powell
Popular vote	150	133	15
Percentage	50.4%	44.6%	5.0%
Leader before election
Alec Douglas-Home
Elected Leader
Edward Heath

The 1965 Conservative Party leadership election was held in July 1965 to elect Alec Douglas-Home's successor as Leader of the Conservative Party. Edward Heath, the Shadow Chancellor of the Exchequer, was elected with 50.4 per cent of the vote, defeating Reginald Maudling, the Shadow Foreign Secretary on 44.6 per cent.

It was the first formal leadership election to be held by the Parliamentary Conservative Party. Previous leaders had emerged through a consultation process, but this procedure had fallen into disrepute following the manoeuvrings over the leadership at the 1963 party conference which had led to the appointment of Douglas-Home, who at the time was a hereditary peer in the House of Lords and not an elected member of Parliament. The plans for how the election would work were published in February 1965, and agreed upon by the parliamentary party thereafter.

== Candidates ==
=== Declared candidates ===
- Edward Heath, Shadow Chancellor of the Exchequer, Member of Parliament for Bexley
- Reginald Maudling, Shadow Foreign Secretary, Member of Parliament for Barnet
- Enoch Powell, Shadow Minister of Transport, Member of Parliament for Wolverhampton South West

=== Potential candidates who declined to stand ===
- Quintin Hogg, Shadow Minister without Portfolio, Member of Parliament for St Marylebone
- Selwyn Lloyd, Shadow Leader of the House of Commons, Member of Parliament for Wirral
- Iain Macleod, Shadow Minister for Steel, Member of Parliament for Enfield West
- Duncan Sandys, Shadow Commonwealth Secretary and Shadow Secretary of State for the Colonies, Member of Parliament for Streatham
- Christopher Soames, Shadow Secretary of State for Defence, Member of Parliament for Bedford
- Peter Thorneycroft, Shadow Home Secretary, Member of Parliament for Monmouth

== Election campaign ==
The former prime minister Alec Douglas-Home triggered the election on 23 July 1965, by resigning at a full meeting of the 1922 Committee in committee room 14.

It was widely assumed that both Edward Heath, Shadow Chancellor, and Reginald Maudling, Shadow Foreign Secretary, would stand. Members of the "magic circle" of old Etonians chose not to contend the election, with widespread agreement that a younger and modern face was needed to front the Conservative Party.

Another potential "modernising" candidate, Iain Macleod, ruled himself out immediately. He might have received 40 to 45 votes had he stood, but he instead endorsed Heath.

Other names that were seen as possible contenders were Quintin Hogg, Peter Thorneycroft and Enoch Powell, Shadow Transport Minister (who eventually did stand). Some were angered by Powell's candidature, as a complication in an otherwise clear contest.

Maudling, the most experienced and publicly known of the candidates, was generally considered to be the favourite. Heath's prospects were seen as either tie-ing or preventing Maudling from reaching the 15% lead needed to win outright. It was also thought that Powell would take support away from Heath, whose backers predominantly came from northern England and industrial cities (such as Birmingham and Wolverhampton), as opposed to Maudling's geographically wider support. Heath, however, fought a more effective leadership campaign, organised by his young lieutenant Peter Walker, and by the eve of the election, the Heath camp believed they had a clear lead. Maudling, by contrast, fought a lacklustre campaign. He assumed, for example, that William Whitelaw would vote for him, but he voted for Heath.

The election was managed by the Chairman of the 1922 Committee, Sir William Anstruther-Gray. The result of the ballot on 27 July was as follows:

Only ballot: 27 July 1965
Candidate	Votes	%
Edward Heath	150	50.4
Reginald Maudling	133	44.6
Enoch Powell	15	5.0
second ballot required, but Maudling withdrew

The rules in place required the victor to have both an absolute majority (which Heath had narrowly achieved) and, in the first ballot, at least a 15% lead of votes actually cast (not counting abstaining members - this would be changed in the mid-1970s review of the rules). As Heath had not achieved the latter hurdle, the election could therefore have gone to further rounds. However, Maudling conceded defeat and Heath was duly declared leader.

Powell had not expected to win, but said he had "left his visiting card", i.e. publicly demonstrated himself to be a potential future leader. However, the 1965 leadership contest showed Powell's lack of support in the Parliamentary Party, and thereafter Heath felt able to call his bluff. In 1968 Heath sacked Powell from the Conservative front bench after Powell had delivered the Rivers of Blood speech, although he held great sway over public opinion in the following years. However, by the next time a leadership vote was held (in 1975) he had become an Ulster Unionist and so was no longer eligible.
