= Rhondda West by-election =

Rhondda West by-election may refer to one of two by-elections held in the British House of Commons constituency of Rhondda West:

- 1920 Rhondda West by-election
- 1967 Rhondda West by-election
