= 1933 Rhondda East by-election =

UK parliamentary by-election

The 1933 Rhondda East by-election was a parliamentary by-election held on 28 March 1933 for the British House of Commons constituency of Rhondda East in Wales.

== Vacancy ==
The seat had become vacant when the Labour Member of Parliament (MP) Lt-Col David Watts-Morgan had died on 23 February 1933, aged 65. He had held the seat since the constituency was created for the 1918 general election.

== 1931 general election ==
The previous contest was comfortably won by Labour; Watts-Morgan polled 68.1% of the vote in a two-way contest with the Communist, Arthur Horner. There was no candidate standing in support of the National Government.

== Candidates ==
The Communist, Arthur Horner, was standing here for the third time. The new Labour candidate, William Mainwaring, a local miners agent, was contesting a parliamentary election for the first time. None of the leading Labour figures who had lost their seats at the last General Election expressed an interest in standing here. The Liberal Party, who had not contested this seat last time, fielded another first time candidate in Professor William D. Thomas. Thomas stood in opposition to the National Government. Still no candidate supporting the National Government was prepared to stand here.

As a result, the election campaign remained an essentially local affair.

== Result ==
1933 Rhondda East by-election
Party	Candidate	Votes	%	±%
Labour	William Mainwaring	14,127	42.5	−25.6
Communist	Arthur Horner	11,228	33.8	+1.9
Liberal	William D. Thomas	7,851	23.6	N/A
Majority		2,899	8.7	−27.5
Turnout		33,206	74.9	+1.2
Registered electors		44,311		
Labour hold		Swing		

== Aftermath ==
If the Communist Party was to re-gain a parliamentary foothold, its best prospects were always going to be in a seat like Rhondda East at a time when the Labour Party was demoralised. Despite having such ideal conditions, it could not make the breakthrough.

William Mainwaring's victory started his parliamentary career which went on unbroken until 1959. Arthur Horner, despite having built a local electoral base for the Communist Party, was replaced as candidate for 1935 by the party's national leader, Harry Pollitt. Horner never made it to parliament. William Thomas did not stand for parliament again.

== See also ==
- Rhondda East constituency
- 1920 Rhondda West by-election
- 1967 Rhondda West by-election
- Rhondda (district)
- Lists of United Kingdom by-elections
- United Kingdom by-election records
