= Alec Jones =

British politician (1924–1983)

The Right Honourable Alec Jones MP

Shadow Secretary of State for Wales
- In office 14 June 1979 – 20 March 1983
- Leader: James Callaghan; Michael Foot
- Preceded by: John Morris
- Succeeded by: Denzil Davies

Parliamentary Under-Secretary of State for Wales
- In office 12 June 1975 – 4 May 1979
- Prime Minister: Harold Wilson; James Callaghan
- Preceded by: Ted Rowlands
- Succeeded by: Michael Roberts

Under-Secretary of State, Health and Social Security
- In office 18 October 1974 – 12 June 1975
- Prime Minister: Harold Wilson
- Preceded by: Robert Brown
- Succeeded by: Michael Meacher

Member of Parliament for Rhondda Rhondda West (1967–1974)
- In office 9 March 1967 – 20 March 1983
- Preceded by: Iorwerth Rhys Thomas
- Succeeded by: Allan Rogers

Personal details
- Born: Trevor Alec Jones; 12 August 1924 Clydach Vale, Rhondda, Wales
- Died: 20 March 1983 (aged 58) Tonypandy, Rhondda, Wales
- Party: Labour
- Spouse: Mildred Maureen Evans (m. 1950)
- Children: 1 son
- Education: Bangor Normal College

Trevor Alec Jones (12 August 1924 – 20 March 1983) was a British Labour Party politician who served as Member of Parliament (MP) for Rhondda West from 1967 to 1974 and Rhondda from 1974 until his death in 1983. He held ministerial positions in the governments of Harold Wilson and James Callaghan, serving as Parliamentary Under-Secretary of State for Health and Social Security (1974–1975) and Parliamentary Under-Secretary of State for Wales (1975–1979). Following Labour's defeat in the 1979 general election, he became Principal Opposition spokesman on Welsh affairs and Shadow Secretary of State for Wales until his death.

== Early life and education ==
Jones was born on 12 August 1924 in Clydach Vale, Rhondda, the son of Alexander (Alec) Jones. He was educated at Rhondda County Boys' Grammar School in Porth. During World War II, Jones worked as a clerk to the Rhondda Urban District Council from 1940 to 1942, before serving in the Royal Air Force from 1942 to 1945.

After the war, Jones attended Bangor Normal College from 1945 to 1947, where he obtained a teaching qualification. He subsequently worked as a teacher, first in Essex from 1947 to 1949, and then at Blaenclydach secondary school from 1949 to 1967. During this period, he joined the Labour Party in 1945 and became actively involved in local politics.

== Political career ==
Before entering Parliament, Jones was active in Labour politics, serving as chairman of the Wood Green Constituency Labour Party and secretary of the Rhondda West Constituency Labour Party from 1965 to 1967. He also served as secretary of the Rhondda branch of the National Association of Labour Teachers and acted as political agent to Iorwerth Thomas, the Member of Parliament for Rhondda West.

=== Entry to Parliament ===
Jones's opportunity to enter Parliament came following the death of Iorwerth Thomas on 3 December 1966. Having served as Thomas's political agent, Jones was selected as the Labour candidate for the resulting by-election. He won the seat on 9 March 1967 and served as MP for Rhondda West until the constituency was abolished in the February 1974 general election.

Following boundary changes, Jones was elected as MP for the newly constituted Rhondda constituency in February 1974, which he represented until his death in 1983. During his parliamentary career, Jones established one of the safest Labour seats in Britain, achieving a majority of more than 38,000 votes in the 1979 general election.

=== Ministerial career ===
Following Labour's victory in the October 1974 general election, Jones was appointed as Parliamentary Under-Secretary of State for Health and Social Security in Harold Wilson's government on 18 October 1974. In this role, he succeeded Robert Brown and served until 12 June 1975, when he was succeeded by Michael Meacher.

On 12 June 1975, Jones was promoted to Parliamentary Under-Secretary of State for Wales in the Welsh Office, serving under Secretaries of State John Morris and later during the James Callaghan government. He held this position until Labour's defeat in the 1979 general election on 4 May 1979. As Parliamentary Under-Secretary for Wales, Jones had special responsibility for housing, land reclamation, local government and devolution during a crucial period for Welsh governance.

=== Opposition years ===
Following Labour's defeat in 1979, Jones was appointed as Principal Opposition spokesman on Welsh affairs, effectively serving as Shadow Secretary of State for Wales under James Callaghan and later Michael Foot. He was made a Privy Councillor in 1979, granting him the style "The Right Honourable". Jones also served as secretary to the Welsh Parliamentary Labour Party during this period. He continued in this role until his death in March 1983, shortly before the 1983 general election.

== Personal life ==
On 12 August 1950, Jones married Mildred Maureen Evans, daughter of William T. Evans. The couple had one son. They lived at 58 Kenry Street, Tonypandy, in the Rhondda Valley.

== Death ==
Jones had suffered from a heart condition for several years prior to his death. He died at his home in Tonypandy on 20 March 1983, at the age of 58, just weeks before the 1983 general election. His death was announced in the House of Commons on 21 March 1983, with the Speaker expressing "our sense of the loss we have sustained and our sympathy with the relatives of the right hon. Member." Jones was cremated at Glyntaff Crematorium. He was succeeded as MP for Rhondda by Allan Rogers, who won the seat in the subsequent general election.

Parliament of the United Kingdom
Preceded by Iorwerth Rhys Thomas	Member of Parliament for Rhondda West; 1967–February 1974	Constituency abolished
New constituency	Member of Parliament for Rhondda; February 1974–1983	Succeeded by Allan Rogers
