= Elfed Davies, Baron Davies of Penrhys =

British politician (1913-1992)

Gwilym Elfed Davies, Baron Davies of Penrhys (9 October 1913 – 28 April 1992) was a Welsh Labour Party politician.

Born in Pontygwaith, Rhondda to Welsh-speaking parents, David and Miriam Elizabeth Davies, Elfed was educated at the Tylorstown Rhondda Elementary School before becoming a coal miner.

Davies joined the South Wales Miners' Federation, and was chair of its Tylorstown Lodge from 1934, then treasurer from 1940, and secretary from 1954. From 1958 to 1959, he was the chair of the Aberdare and Rhondda District of the National Union of Mineworkers (UK).

Davies was active in the Labour Party, serving on the executive of the Rhondda East Divisional Labour Party, and the Rhondda Borough Labour Party. From 1954 to 1961, he served on Glamorgan County Council. He was elected as member of parliament (MP) for Rhondda East at the 1959 general election, and from 1964 until 1968, was Parliamentary Private Secretary to Ray Gunter, the Minister of Power.

Davies served in Parliament until his constituency was abolished at the February 1974 general election. He was subsequently created a life peer as Baron Davies of Penrhys, of Rhondda in the County of Mid Glamorgan on 8 July 1974. In retirement, he served on the South Wales Electricity Board, and the National Sports Council for Wales.

Parliament of the United Kingdom
Preceded by William Mainwaring	Member of Parliament for Rhondda East; 1959 – February 1974	Constituency abolished
