= William Abraham (trade unionist) =

Welsh trade unionist and politician

The Right Honourable William Abraham
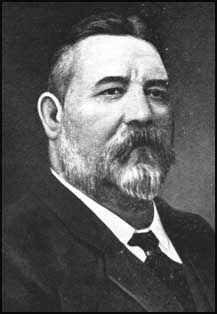

Member of Parliament for Rhondda West Rhondda (1885–1918)
- In office 1885–1920
- Preceded by: Constituency established
- Succeeded by: William John

Personal details
- Born: 14 June 1842 Cwmafan, Glamorgan, Wales
- Died: 14 May 1922 (aged 79) Pentre, Glamorgan, Wales
- Party: Labour (1910–1922); Liberal–Labour (1885–1910)

William Abraham (14 June 1842 – 14 May 1922), universally known by his bardic name, Mabon, was a Welsh trade unionist and Liberal/Labour politician, and a member of parliament (MP) from 1885 to 1920. Although an MP for 35 years, it was as a trade unionist that Abraham is most well known. Initially a pioneer of trade unionism, who fought to enshrine the principle of workers' representation against the opposition of the coal-owners, he was regarded in later life as a moderate voice believing that disputes should be solved through conciliation rather than industrial action. This drew him into conflict with younger and more militant leaders from the 1890s onwards. Although the defeat of the miners in the Welsh coal strike of 1898 was a clear defeat for Mabon's strategy, his prestige was sufficient to ensure that he became the first president of the South Wales Miners' Federation which was established in the wake of the dispute. Abraham was noted for his powerful speaking voice, and was a renowned orator in English and Welsh.

== Early life ==
Abraham was born in Cwmafan, Glamorgan, the fourth son of Thomas and Mary Abraham. He was educated at Cwmafan National School but left at a young age, becoming a tinplater before finding work at the local colliery as a 'door boy' (Note: A door boy opened and closed the doors regulating the passage of air for ventilation underground.) at the age of ten. In 1864 Abraham, with another eleven Welsh miners, agreed to work in a copper mine in Chile for three years. Sailing to Valparaíso via Cape Horn, the ship had to avoid both storms and the Spanish Navy who were attempting to block trade with their rebel colonies in South America. When they arrived at the mine there was no work and so Abraham returned to the coast and managed to gain working passage on a ship back to Britain. After being away for thirteen months he was fortunate to regain his old job. After a slump in 1869 he was placed on short time, he switched to a tinplate works in Swansea.

It was around the 1870s that he became known as a singer and poet, adopting the eisteddfod name Gwilym Mabon, soon Mabon was the title by which he would be best known. Abraham continued working in the mining industry and by 1871 was working at the Caergynydd Pit in Waunarlwydd, near Swansea.

== Early trade union history ==
In 1871 Abraham became a representative for the cause of his fellow miners, when he negotiated for the workers of the Caergynnydd Pit in a dispute with the managers. During the dispute, Lewis Morgan of the Abergorchy Colliery, who was the Rhondda advocate of the Amalgamated Association of Miners, travelled to Waunarlwydd to speak to the miners. Lewis persuaded Abraham to form a Union at the colliery, and Abraham was eventually appointed as the miners' agent for the Loughor District of the A.A.M. in 1872, and represented the district at national conferences in Manchester and Wallsend. Despite helping to enroll 8,000 miners into the A.A.M. for his district, funds for the union were severely stretched after a series on strikes during the early to mid-1870s. In 1875, during another strike, the (mine) Owners' Association, discovering the A.A.M. was low on funds, ruthlessly switched a 10 percent wage cut to a 15 percent cut. Only the anthracite district remained loyal to Mabon.

The miners were forced back to work and the A.A.M. became bankrupt and was dissolved. This left Abraham as the only miners' agent in the entire South Wales area, as the other agents were forced to find other forms of employment. Abraham left Waunarlwydd and travelled to the Rhondda, a rapidly growing mining area, and in 1877 joined the Cambrian Miners' Association, one of the few union wings of the A.A.M. to survive the parent union's collapse. Despite now being a prominent unionist, the spirit of the miners' within the Rhondda Valley was so low, that when he first addressed a meeting in Pentre in 1877 only 30 people attended. Abraham continued speaking to the miners, and by April 1877, at a meeting in Llwynypia it was agreed that the union should be rebuilt and contributions should be made to a District Fund. The Cambrian Miners' Association was reorganised and with Abraham as leader the membership grew from nothing in 1877 to 14,000 members in 1885, making it the largest of the seven district in the South Wales coalfield.

== Parliamentary career ==
William Abraham c1895

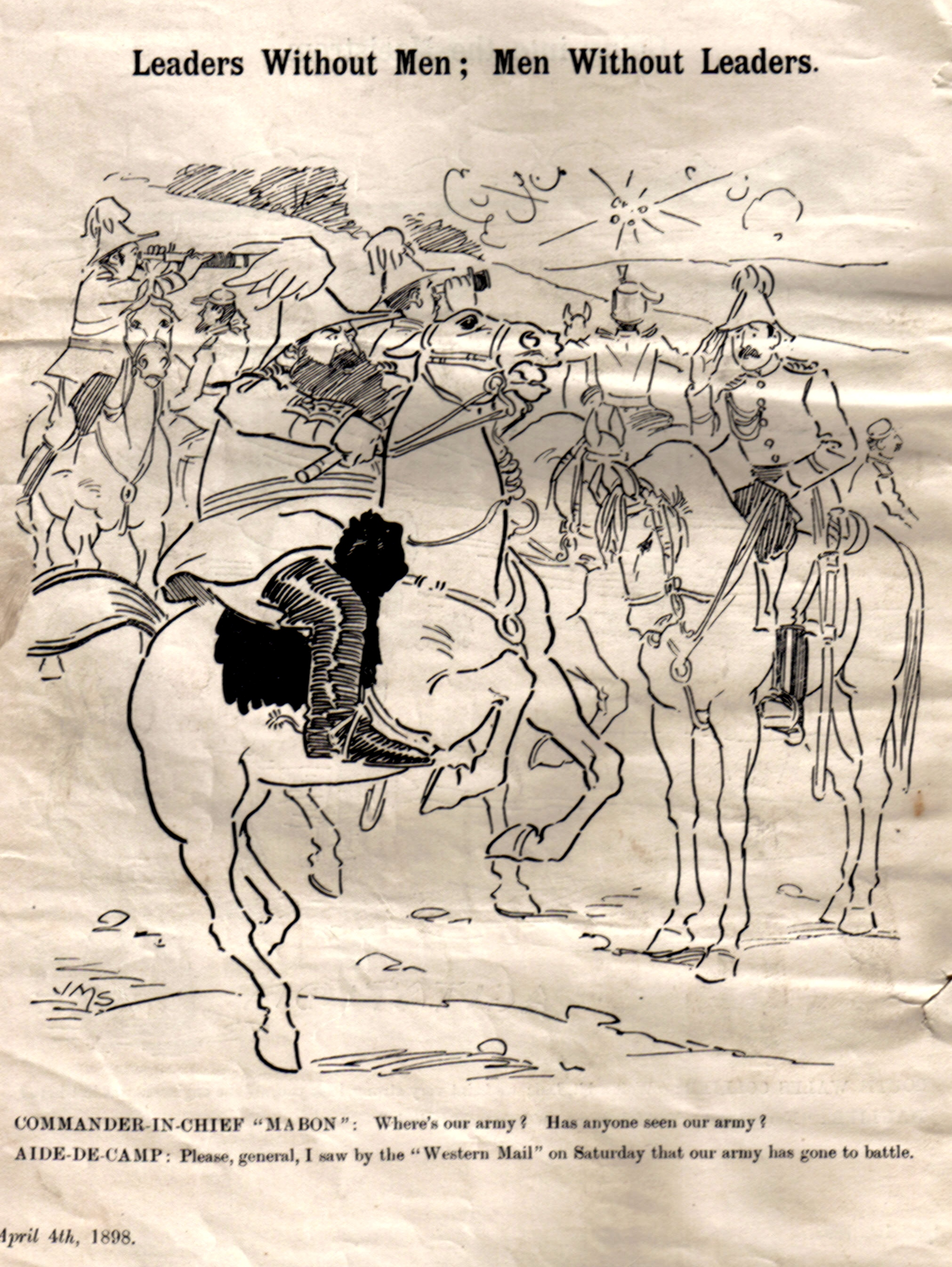
Western Mail cartoon by JM Staniforth of Abraham during 1898 coal strike

In 1874 Abraham was briefly mentioned as a possible candidate in the Carmarthen Boroughs constituency in opposition to Arthur Stepney and Charles Nevill, although there was no real prospect of him standing. During a fiercely contrasted election, it was alleged, however, that Abraham was 'specially retained to influence and prejudice the colliers and other men against Mr Nevill.' These efforts were in vain, however, as Nevill won the election.

Abraham was elected at the 1885 general election as the Liberal–Labour (Lib–Lab) MP for the new Rhondda constituency in Wales, one of twelve Lib–Lab MPs elected that year. However, following his election, Abraham did not seek to develop a power-base beyond the Liberal association which was dominated by those who had opposed him in 1885. Although he championed the cause of labour he believed that it could be accommodated within the Liberal programme.

In 1898 he was one of the chief negotiators on behalf of the colliers in the Welsh coal strike of 1898, and although the miners were unsuccessful in their action it saw the creation of the South Wales Miners' Federation of which Abraham became president.

Before his re-election at the January 1910 general election, he and most other Lib–Lab MPs from the Miners' Federation of Great Britain joined the Labour Party.

He held the Rhondda seat until its abolition at the 1918 general election, when he was elected for the new Rhondda West constituency. He resigned his seat in 1920, and died two years later aged 79.

== Sources ==
=== Books and Journals ===
- Craig, F. W. S. (1983) [1969]. British parliamentary election results 1918–1949 (3rd ed.). Chichester: Parliamentary Research Services. ISBN 0-900178-06-X.
- Lewis, E.D. (1959). The Rhondda Valleys. London: Phoenix House.
- Lloyd, John Edward; Jenkins, R.T. (1958). The Dictionary of Welsh Biography Down to 1940. Cardiff: William Lewis.
- McCririck, Mary (1963). Stories of Wales: Book 3. Denbigh: Gee & Sons Ltd.
- Morgan, Kenneth O. (1981). Rebirth of a Nation. Wales 1889-1980. Oxford: Oxford University Press. ISBN 0-19-821760-9.
- Morgan, Kenneth O (1991). Wales in British Politics 1868–1922 (3rd ed.). Cardiff: University of Wales Press. ISBN 0708311245.
- Pretty, David A. (June 2001). "David Morgan ('Dai o'r Nant'), miners' agent. A Portrait of Leadership in the South Wales Coalfield". Welsh History Review. 20 (3): 495–531.
- Williams, Chris (1996). Democratic Rhondda: Politics and Society 1885-1951. Cardiff: University of Wales Press.

=== Online ===
- Lloyd, John Edward; Jenkins, R.T. (1958). The Dictionary of Welsh Biography Down to 1940. Cardiff: William Lewis.

Parliament of the United Kingdom
New constituency	Member of Parliament for Rhondda; 1885–1918	Constituency abolished
New constituency	Member of Parliament for Rhondda West; 1918–1920	Succeeded by William John
Trade union offices
Preceded by New position	Agent for the Anthracite District of the South Wales Miners' Federation; 1898–1900	Succeeded by Daronwy Isaac
Preceded by New position	Agent for the Rhondda District of the South Wales Miners' Federation; 1898–1901	Succeeded by David Watts Morgan
Preceded by new position	President of the South Wales Miners' Federation; 1898–1912	Succeeded by William Brace
Preceded by William Mullin and James O'Grady	Trades Union Congress representative to the American Federation of Labour; 1904; With: James Wignall	Succeeded by David Gilmour and William Mosses
Preceded by Enoch Edwards	Treasurer of the Miners' Federation of Great Britain; 1904–1918	Succeeded by James Robson
