= Will John (politician) =

Welsh Labour Party politician

John in 1923

William John (6 October 1878 – 27 August 1955) was a Welsh Labour Party politician, and a member of parliament (MP) for thirty years.

At the 1920 Rhondda West by-election, he was elected as MP for the safe Labour constituency of Rhondda West, and held the seat until he retired from the House of Commons at the 1950 general election.

He was Labour's Deputy Chief Whip from 1942 to 1945, serving in Winston Churchill's war-time coalition government as Comptroller of the Household from 1942 to 1944 and as a Lord of the Treasury from 1944 to 1945.

Parliament of the United Kingdom
Preceded by William Abraham	Member of Parliament for Rhondda West; 1920 – 1950	Succeeded by Iorwerth Thomas
Political offices
Preceded by William Whiteley	Comptroller of the Household (Government whip); 1942–1944	Succeeded by George Mathers
Trade union offices
Preceded by David Watts Morgan	Agent for the Rhondda District of the South Wales Miners' Federation; 1915–1920; With: A. J. Cook (1919–1920)	Succeeded by A. J. Cook and David Lewis
