= Gwilym Rowlands =

Welsh Conservative Party politician

Sir Gwilym Rowlands CBE JP (2 December 1878 – 16 January 1949) was a Welsh Conservative Party politician.

Rowlands was the son of Rowland Rowlands, who was manager of the Penygraig Colliery Company in the Rhondda. He was educated at Penygraig Board School and Health School, and became a member of Rhondda Urban District Council from 1913 to 1919 and from 1922 to 1929.

He first stood for election to the House of Commons as a Coalition Conservative candidate at a by-election in 1920 in the Labour Party-held constituency of Rhondda West, but lost by a wide margin. Despite being an official Coalition Conservative candidate, Rowlands described himself as "Labour in the Conservative interest", having been nominated by the local Conservative workingmen's clubs. (He was president of Dunraven Conservative Club in Penygraig and Vice-President of Ton-Pentre Conservative Club in Ystrad). He stood again in Rhondda West at the 1922 general election, losing by a wider margin.

Rowlands was unsuccessful again at Caerphilly in 1923 and 1924, and at Pontypool 1929, but finally won a seat at the 1935 general election in Flintshire. He stood down from Parliament at the 1945 general election.

Roberts was appointed a Commander of the Order of the British Empire (CBE) in the 1928 Birthday Honours for political and public services in Rhondda.

Parliament of the United Kingdom
Preceded by Frederick Llewellyn-Jones	Member of Parliament for Flintshire; 1935 – 1945	Succeeded by Nigel Birch
