= David Watts Morgan =

Welsh politician (1867–1933)

David Watts Morgan CBE DSO JP
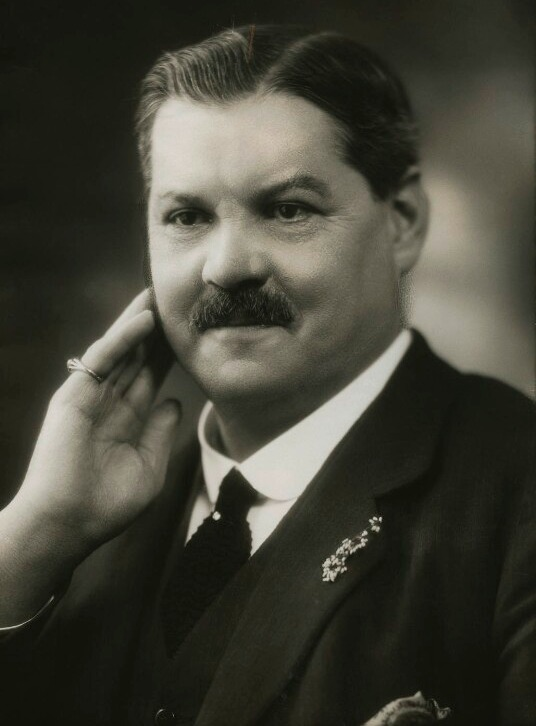
- David Watts Morgan in 1923

Member of Parliament for Rhondda East
- In office 1918–1933
- Preceded by: new constituency
- Succeeded by: William Mainwaring

Personal details
- Born: 18 December 1867 Skewen, Wales
- Died: 23 February 1933 (aged 65) Porth, Wales
- Party: Labour Party 1918–1933
- Awards: Distinguished Service Order; Commander of the Order of the British Empire

Military service
- Allegiance: United Kingdom
- Branch/service: British Army
- Years of service: 1914–1919
- Rank: Lieutenant-Colonel
- Unit: 10th and 17th Battalions, Welsh Regiment Works Battalion, King's Liverpool Regiment Labour Corps
- Battles/wars: First World War: Battle of Cambrai (1917)

David Watts Morgan, CBE, DSO, JP (18 December 1867 – 23 February 1933), who later in life hyphenated his name to Watts-Morgan, was a Welsh trade unionist, a Labour politician, and a Member of Parliament (MP) from 1918 to 1933.

Described as "[straddling] the transition in south Wales miners' politics from Lib-Labism to socialism, but ... never fully representative of either", Morgan encouraged Rhondda miners to enlist in the army in 1914 following the outbreak of the First World War, and was appointed Commander of the Order of the British Empire for his efforts. He initially served in the Welsh Regiment, before becoming a lieutenant-colonel in the Labour Corps. Morgan was awarded the Distinguished Service Order for bravery at the Battle of Cambrai in 1917, earning him the nickname "Dai Alphabet" in South Wales.

== Early life ==
David Watts Morgan was born in Skewen, Wales, in 1867 to Thomas and Margaret Morgan. He was educated at Skewen Elementary School until the age of eleven, when he began work as a pit boy, helping miners with the less strenuous work such as manning ventilation doors. At the age of seventeen he was employed as a coal miner in Ynyshir in the Rhondda. In 1880 Watts Morgan became a checkweighman at the newly opened National Colliery in Wattstown, a responsible position that involved tallying the weight of coal extracted by each miner when it reached the surface. During his time at Wattstown he took evening classes to become a mining engineer. He never practised once qualified, but the knowledge he gained was useful to him in his role as the leader of several mine rescues, and gave him a practical knowledge that informed his later political life.

== Trade unionism ==
From checkweighman Watts Morgan rose to the position of district miners' agent in 1898, becoming a member of the Rhondda Labour and Liberal Association (RLLA). Watts Morgan followed in the political Liberalism of William "Mabon" Abraham, and began speaking at RLLA meetings and banquets. In 1899 the Porth and Cymmer seat for the Glamorgan County Council (GCC) fell vacant, and Watts Morgan was seen as a viable candidate from both Liberal and Labour standpoints, but was surprisingly defeated at the by-election by local timber merchant David Jenkins. The next year Jenkins declined to stand for re-election, but the miners' district committee refused Watts Morgan time off from his agent's duties and the seat was won uncontested by colleague James Baker.

In 1902, James Baker died at the age of 41, leaving an opening in the GCC. On this occasion Watts Morgan was permitted to advance as a Labour candidate and was returned unopposed. By 1903 he was being talked of as a possible candidate for a south Wales parliamentary constituency. He joined the South Wales Miners' Federation at its inception and by 1902 he was pushing for a greater political role for the organisation. By 1908 the Federation was making great headway in the Rhondda and was substantially improving conditions for the miners. At this time Watts Morgan was Agent and District Secretary at No.1 Rhondda District under William Abraham.

A moderate leader, he worked fruitlessly alongside William Abraham to resolve the 1910–11 Cambrian Combine dispute, after the two men were shunned by the more radical miners' leaders. Although espousing Gladstonian Liberalism and opposing the affiliation of The Miners' Federation of Great Britain to the Labour Party, Watts Morgan joined the more radical and Marxist Plebs' League and sat on the board of governors for the Central Labour College.

== Military service ==
On 4 August 1914, Watts Morgan enlisted as a private in the 10th Battalion (1st Rhondda) of the Welsh Regiment, one of the service battalions formed as part of Kitchener's Army. He was commissioned as a lieutenant in the 17th Battalion (1st Glamorgan) on 7 October, and was promoted to captain on 16 January 1916. Watts Morgan was not initially sent to France, being used instead as a strong voice in the recruitment of men from the Rhondda into the British Army. He also took part in recruitment campaigns in North Wales, where his fluency in the Welsh language was invaluable. Watts Morgan regularly made known his opposition to "peace cranks" who were "insulting the boys of whom we are all so proud." In March 1915, a committee of Rhondda figures presented Morgan with a cheque for 100 guineas to mark his contribution to recruiting, and the Western Mail named him "The Organiser of Victory".

On 15 May 1916 Watts Morgan transferred to a Works Battalion of the King's Liverpool Regiment, he was promoted to major on 24 November 1916, and went to serve in France. The Works Battalions were absorbed by the Labour Corps (forerunner of the Royal Pioneer Corps) in 1917. Watts Morgan was three times Mentioned in Despatches, and on 4 May 1918 was awarded the Distinguished Service Order for leading his pioneer unit in a counter-attack against German forces that were breaking through British lines. The citation for this award was published on 5 July 1918 and read:

T./Maj. David Watts Morgan, Labour Corps. For conspicuous gallantry and devotion to duty. When his camp was heavily shelled with a few N.C.O.'s and men he turned some dug-outs into a temporary dressing station and assisted the wounded in the vicinity. When shelling rendered his position untenable he brought back his men in good order. He displayed great coolness and resource.

After the armistice he commanded a demobilisation station; for his work there he received a letter of thanks from the king. Despite the Oxford Dictionary of National Biography reporting Watts Morgan being promoted to lieutenant-colonel on 8 March 1919, his retirement from the forces, the London Gazette entry of May 1919 describes him as major. Until early June 1921 he is described in The Times and London Gazette as Major D. Watts Morgan, later in the month this changed to Lieutenant-Colonel Watts Morgan. On 30 March 1920 was appointed Commander of the Order of the British Empire for "services in connection with recruiting in South Wales".

== Member of Parliament ==
In February 1918, Watts Morgan was selected as the Labour candidate for the newly formed Rhondda East constituency. As one of the "patriotic" miners' leaders, the Lloyd George coalition did not run a candidate against him, therefore Watts Morgan was elected to the seat unopposed. There was evidence that some wished to run a Liberal candidate against Watts Morgan, but nothing came of it. Watts Morgan made his maiden speech in the House of Commons in April 1919, on one of his special interests, housing. He addressed the House on the state and shortage of housing in the Welsh coalfields as "the chief cause of the industrial unrest. People have been herded together, and that is the reason why there is much unrest in our district at present".

Not a regular speaker in the House, Watts Morgan busied himself with work on various committees, dealing mainly with gas, electricity, river pollution, the Home Office and the Police Council. Despite his work on private bills and his friendly relationship with Prime Minister Ramsay MacDonald he was never considered for office. In the 1922 election, Watts Morgan was forced to contest his seat for the first time when he was challenged by Frederick William Heale. Watts Morgan made it clear that he would defend the interests of ex-servicemen and those injured in industry; he opposed the temperance demand for the local veto. It was a close result for a Rhondda election; Heale lost by just over 3,000 votes. The 1923 election was a different affair, with Watts Morgan defeating Conservative candidate Alfred John Orchard by nearly 13,000 votes.

Watts Morgan was a socialist and trade unionist, but he was also a strong anti-communist and opposed "the local men of Moscow", trade unionists who had embraced communism and whom he saw as extremists. In the 1929 election his main rival was well-known local Liberal Dr. R. D. Chalke, but the biggest interest came from the first communist challenger in the Rhondda, Arthur Horner. Although Watts Morgan had been unwell for the first few months of the year, he roused himself to attend the Ferndale May Day demonstration. When he discovered he was sharing the platform with Communist Party of Great Britain members, Horner, A. J. Cook and Dai Lloyd Davies, he left the stage and joined the crowd so he could heckle Horner's speech from the floor. Watts Morgan described Horner as "the emissary of the blood-stained Comintern of Russia ... working to break down the democratic Government and Trades Union organization of this country." He had little cause for concern, and was re-elected to Rhondda East by a majority of almost 9,000. A smaller turnout in the 1931 election and the absence of a Liberal candidate may have led to Horner making a considerable advance against Watts Morgan in the number of votes polled, but Watts Morgans' majority remained substantial. Watts Morgan's death in 1933 forced a by-election, which was won by William Mainwaring.

== Personal life ==
Watts Morgan was married twice, first to Elizabeth Williams then to Blanche Amy Morgan. Blanche was herself a strong campaigner for miners' rights, and was among a group of agents' wives who promoted the provision of pithead baths, bathing areas for the miners at the surface. She was outspoken in her views, and once supported a political rival of her husband's party, forcing Watts Morgan to make a public apology.

Watts Morgan was a keen sportsman and enjoyed playing golf and bowls. He was a member of several organisations including the Freemasons', Ivorites' and Foresters' friendly societies and was president of the Rhondda and Pontypridd district of the British Legion. A Calvinist Methodist his local place of worship was Bethlehem Church in Porth.

Watts Morgan died at his home in Porth on 23 February 1933 while still in office. He was survived by his wife, two sons, and four daughters. Thousands of people lined the route along which his funeral cortege passed on its way to his burial at Llethr Du cemetery in Trealaw. Local shops and businesses closed as a mark of respect.

== Notes ==
Parliament of the United Kingdom
New constituency	Member of Parliament for Rhondda East; 1918–1933	Succeeded by William Mainwaring
Trade union offices
Preceded by John Wadsworth and Joe Williams	Auditor of the Trades Union Congress; 1906; With: Alfred Smalley	Succeeded by Walter Gee and S. H. Whitehouse
Preceded by William Abraham	Agent for the Rhondda District of the South Wales Miners' Federation; 1901–1915	Succeeded by William John
Preceded by W. E. Harvey and James E. Tattersall	Auditor of the Trades Union Congress; 1912; With: Edward Judson	Succeeded by James Brown and Edward Duxbury
