= Cwm Clydach, Rhondda Cynon Taf =

Coordinates: 51.625°N 3.486°W

Cwm Clydach
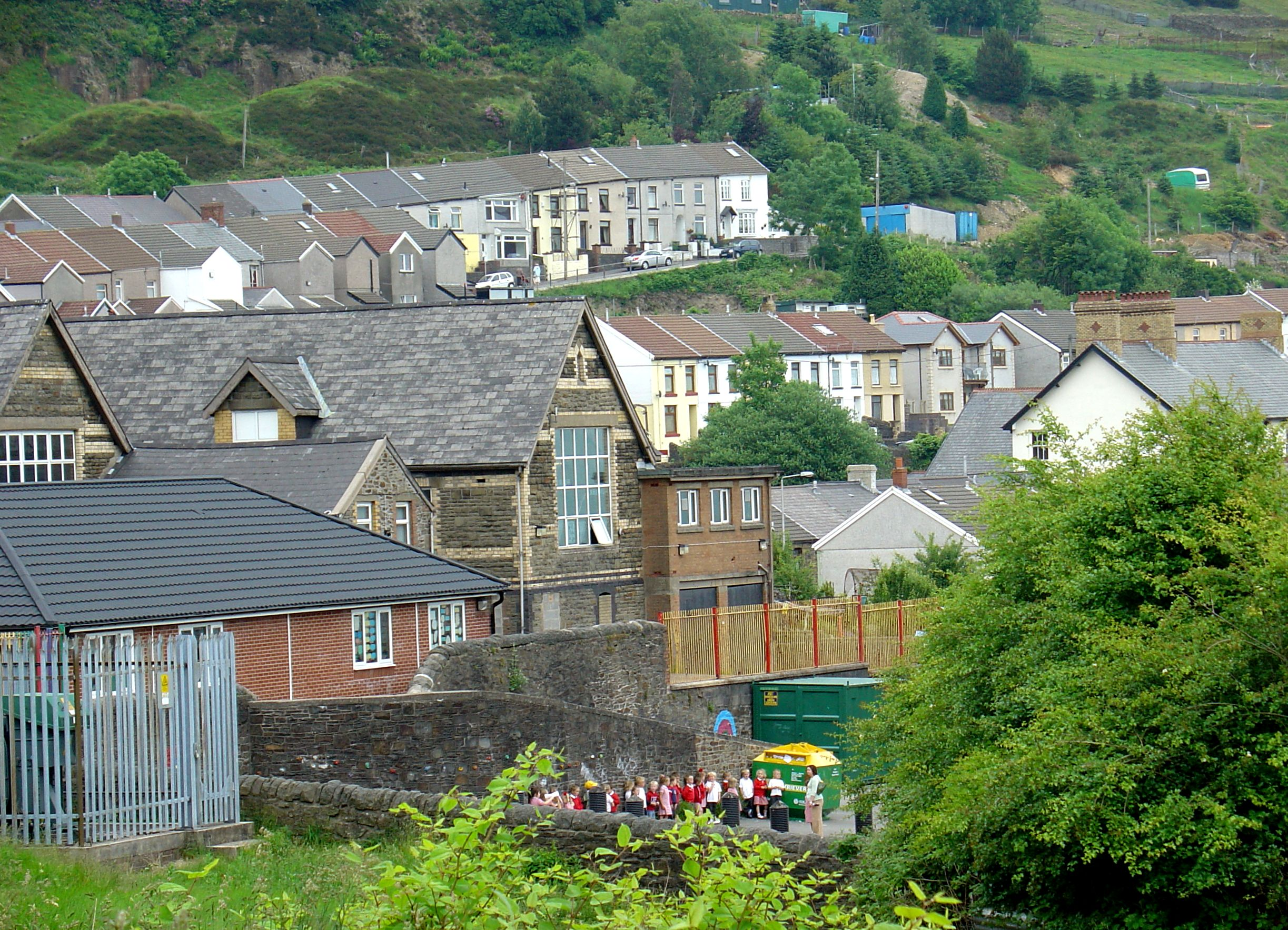
- Population: 2,799 (2011 census)
- OS grid reference: SS982930
- Principal area: Rhondda Cynon Taf
- Preserved county: Mid Glamorgan
- Country: Wales
- Sovereign state: United Kingdom
- Post town: TONYPANDY
- Postcode district: CF40
- Dialling code: 01443
- Police: South Wales
- Fire: South Wales
- Ambulance: Welsh
- UK Parliament: Rhondda
- Senedd Cymru – Welsh Parliament: Rhondda
- List of places UK Wales Rhondda Cynon Taf Map of the community

Cwm Clydach is a community and electoral ward to the northwest of Tonypandy in Rhondda Cynon Taf, Wales. The community and ward covers the valley of the Nant Clydach, which includes the conjoined villages of Clydach Vale and Blaenclydach.

The community includes Cwm Clydach Countryside Park, created on the site of a coal mine, which has two lakes and is a haven for birds, insects and newts.

== History ==
Prior to the arrival of industrialisation in the mid 1800s, the valley comprised part of the farms of Blaen Clydach, Pwllyrhebog, Ffynnon-dwym, and Penpant Clydach. A railway line was laid by the Taff Vale Railway in the 1850s and, by 1875, there were three coal mines in the valley, Cwm Clydach Colliery (opened 1864), Blaen Clydach Colliery (opened in 1875) and Clydach Vale Colliery. The grid of residential streets of Clydach Vale, Blaen Clydach and Penpant Clydach was established by the end of the century. Blaenclydach Drift Mine was opened in 1912.

The collieries gradually closed, Clydach Vale Colliery (known as The Cambrian) closing in 1966.

== Ward ==
The electoral ward of Cwm Clydach is coterminous with the boundaries of the community. Since the formation of Rhondda Cynon Taf in 1995 it has elected a county councillor to sit on Rhondda Cynon Taf County Borough Council. With the exception of 1999-2004 (when it was represented by Plaid Cymru) it has been represented by the Labour Party.
