= Rhondda (UK Parliament constituency) =

UK Parliament constituency (1974–2024)

- Former county constituency for the House of Commons
- Boundary of Rhondda in Wales
- Preserved county: Mid Glamorgan
- Electorate: 50,262 (December 2019)
- Major settlements: Porth, Tonypandy, Treherbert, Treorchy, Tylorstown

1974–2024
- Seats: One
- Created from: Rhondda East and Rhondda West
- Replaced by: Rhondda and Ogmore

1885–1918
- Seats: One
- Type of constituency: County constituency
- Created from: Glamorganshire
- Replaced by: Rhondda East and Rhondda West
- Senedd: Rhondda, South Wales Central

Rhondda was a constituency (Note: A borough constituency (for the purposes of election expenses and type of returning officer).) in Wales in the House of Commons of the UK Parliament. It was represented since its 1974 recreation by the Labour Party. (Note: As with all constituencies, the constituency elects one Member of Parliament (MP) by the first past the post system of election at least every five years.)

The constituency was abolished as part of the 2023 periodic review of Westminster constituencies and under the June 2023 final recommendations of the Boundary Commission for Wales for the 2024 general election. The entire constituency became part of the new seat of Rhondda and Ogmore.

== Boundaries ==
Map of boundaries 2010–2024

1974–1983: The Municipal Borough of Rhondda.

1983–2010: The Borough of Rhondda.

2010–2024: The Rhondda Cynon Taff County Borough electoral divisions of Cwm Clydach, Cymmer, Ferndale, Llwyn-y-pia, Maerdy, Pentre, Pen-y-graig, Porth, Tonypandy, Trealaw, Treherbert, Treorchy, Tylorstown, Ynyshir, and Ystrad.

The Westminster constituency of Rhondda was based around the western edge of the Rhondda Cynon Taf council area, with population centres including Treherbert, Maerdy, Tylorstown, Tonypandy, and Pen-y-Graig. The seat bordered the constituencies of Cynon Valley, Ogmore, Pontypridd, and Aberavon.

== History ==
This constituency was first created under the Redistribution of Seats Act 1885, for the 1885 general election. For the 1918 general election it was divided into Rhondda East and Rhondda West.

The constituency was reunited in 1974. Since 1974, the constituency has always had a large Labour majority, and in the 1987 general election was the safest seat for any party, anywhere in Britain. In 2001, it was the only seat in the country where Liberal Democrats lost their deposit, and the Conservative Party also lost their deposit in their worst performance outside Northern Ireland.

=== Early history: the 1885 general election ===
The constituency was formed following the Representation of the People Act 1884, as a result of the rapid growth of population in the two valleys over the previous twenty years. During the 1880s the demand for working men representatives in the ranks of the Parliamentary Liberal Party were increasingly vociferous and there was a precedent for a Liberal-Labour (Lib-Lab) candidate in South Wales as Thomas Halliday had contested Merthyr Tydfil in 1874.

The local trade union, the Rhondda Steam Coal Miners' Association, laid claim to the candidacy as early as 1883, on the basis that the franchise had been extended to many working men within the county constituencies and that in Mabon, their agent for six years they had the ideal candidate. The local Liberal Association, however, formed in early 1885, was dominated by middle-class business and professional men, and included a disproportionate number of colliery officials. . Lewis Davis of Ferndale, brother of David Davis, Maesyffynnon, one of the leading coalowners in the valley, was selected as president of the association. Ministers, including William Morris of Noddfa, Treorchy were also prominent. At a meeting in April 1885 six names were put forward as possible candidates for the nomination, including Lewis Davis, Mabon and Alfred Thomas, a leading figure in the municipal life of Cardiff. Shortly afterwards, Lewis Davis was invited by the Association to be its parliamentary candidate and defeated Mabon in a ballot by 143 votes to 51. In spite of his selection, however, he declined and proposed that his son, the 22-year-old Frederick Lewis Davis, be the candidate. In a further ballot, F. L. Davis again defeated Mabon by 125 votes to 56.

The refusal of the trade union movement to accept this decision and to support an independent campaign by Mabon is regarded as an important watershed in the political history of South Wales. In terms of policy there was little apparent difference between the candidates, with the only notable difference being that Mabon supported the payment of MPs while Davis did not. The campaign was therefore waged on other grounds. Davis's supporters claimed that Mabon lacked legitimacy, having been rejected by the Liberal Association. Mabon's adherents, in turn, claimed that the miners' had held mass meetings throughout the two valleys to promote his candidature long before the middle-class-dominated Association was established. Davis's youth and inexperience was a major issue, although he had qualified as a barrister. There were also claims of intimidation on both sides. Mabon's supporters were said to be victimised at the workplace while several of Davis's meetings were disrupted by violence.

Class therefore became a major issue in the campaign. The vast majority of Mabon' supporters were trade union activists and working men, along with a relatively small number of tradesmen and professionals, some of whom had links of one form or another to the miners' union. These included Walter H. Morgan of Pontypridd, often described as the miners' lawyer. One nonconformist minister, supported Mabon, namely John Salisbury Edwards of Treorchy. In contest, Davis had the support of the vast majority of the middle-classes in the Rhondda, and natural deference together with the paternalistic influence of the Davis family, in the Rhondda Fach in particular, was a factor.

On polling day, Mabon scored a clear and decisive victory.

General election 1885: Rhondda
Party	Candidate	Votes	%	±%
Lib-Lab	William Abraham	3,859	56.3	N/A
Liberal	Frederick Lewis Davis	2,992	43.7	N/A
Majority		867	12.6	N/A
Turnout		6,851	83.5	N/A
Lib-Lab win (new seat)				

Despite the fierce contest the two wings of the Liberal Party in the Rhondda were soon reconciled. After the result, the Davis family accepted Mabon's victory and he was not challenged thereafter for the parliamentary seat. Following the election, Mabon's supporters established the Rhondda Labour and Liberal Association which shortly afterwards absorbed the rival Liberal Association which had supported Davis. Mabon was returned unopposed the following year.

General election 1886: Rhondda
Party	Candidate	Votes	%	±%
Lib-Lab	William Abraham	Unopposed		
Registered electors				
Lib-Lab hold				

== Members of Parliament ==
=== 1885–1918 ===
Election	Member	Party
1885	William Abraham	Lib-Lab
1910	William Abraham	Labour
1918	Constituency abolished: See Rhondda East and Rhondda West	

=== 1974–2024 ===
Election	Member	Party	Notes
Feb 1974	Alec Jones	Labour	Shadow Welsh Secretary 1979–1983. Died in office March 1983; no by-election held due to imminent general election.
1983	Allan Rogers	Labour	
2001	Chris Bryant	Labour	Shadow Cabinet Member 2011–16
2024	Constituency abolished		

== Election results 1885–1910 ==
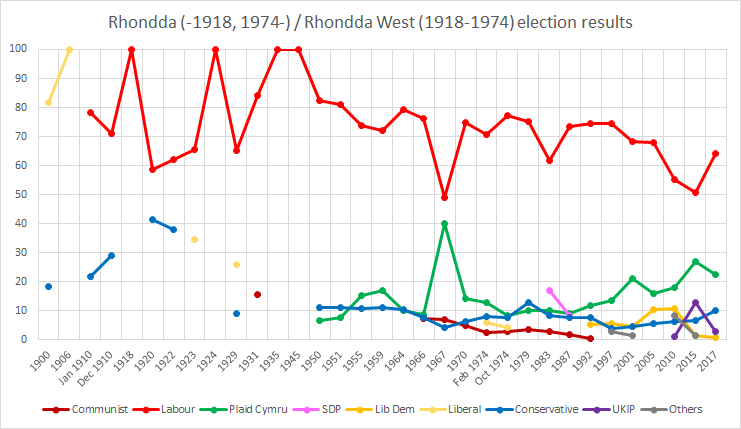
Rhondda election results

=== Elections in the 1880s ===
General election 1885: Rhondda
Party	Candidate	Votes	%	±%
Lib-Lab	William Abraham	3,859	56.3	N/A
Liberal	Frederick Lewis Davis	2,992	43.7	N/A
Majority		867	12.6	N/A
Turnout		6,851	83.5	N/A
Registered electors		8,210		
Lib-Lab win (new seat)				

General election 1886: Rhondda
Party	Candidate	Votes	%	±%
Lib-Lab	William Abraham	Unopposed		
Registered electors				
Lib-Lab hold				

=== Elections in the 1890s ===
General election 1892: Rhondda
Party	Candidate	Votes	%	±%
Lib-Lab	William Abraham	Unopposed		
Registered electors				
Lib-Lab hold				

General election 1895: Rhondda
Party	Candidate	Votes	%	±%
Lib-Lab	William Abraham	Unopposed		
Registered electors				
Lib-Lab hold				

=== Elections in the 1900s ===
William Abraham

General election 1900: Rhondda
Party	Candidate	Votes	%	±%
Lib-Lab	William Abraham	8,383	81.7	N/A
Conservative	Robert Hughes	1,874	18.3	N/A
Majority		6,509	63.4	N/A
Turnout		10,257	81.7	N/A
Registered electors		12,549		
Lib-Lab hold		Swing	N/A	

General election 1906: Rhondda
Party	Candidate	Votes	%	±%
Lib-Lab	William Abraham	Unopposed		
Registered electors				
Lib-Lab hold				

=== Elections in the 1910s ===
General election January 1910: Rhondda
Party	Candidate	Votes	%	±%
Labour	William Abraham	12,436	78.2	N/A
Conservative	Harold Lloyd	3,471	21.8	N/A
Majority		8,965	56.4	N/A
Turnout		15,907	90.2	N/A
Registered electors		17,640		
Labour hold		Swing	N/A	

General election December 1910: Rhondda
Party	Candidate	Votes	%	±%
Labour	William Abraham	9,073	71.0	−7.2
Conservative	Harold Lloyd	3,701	29.0	+7.2
Majority		5,372	42.0	−14.4
Turnout		12,774	72.4	−17.8
Registered electors		17,640		
Labour hold		Swing	−7.2	

== Election results 1974–2024 ==
=== Elections in the 1970s ===
General election February 1974: Rhondda
Party	Candidate	Votes	%	±%
Labour	Alec Jones	36,880	70.7	N/A
Plaid Cymru	Glyn Powell James	6,739	12.9	N/A
Conservative	Peter Leyshon	4,111	7.9	N/A
Liberal	Dennis James Austin	3,056	5.9	N/A
Communist	Arthur True	1,374	2.6	N/A
Majority		30,141	57.8	N/A
Turnout		52,160	80.0	N/A
Registered electors		65,192		
Labour win (new seat)				

General election October 1974: Rhondda
Party	Candidate	Votes	%	±%
Labour	Alec Jones	38,654	77.1	+6.4
Plaid Cymru	Donald Morgan	4,173	8.3	−4.6
Conservative	Peter Leyshon	3,739	7.5	−0.4
Liberal	Dennis James Austin	2,142	4.3	−1.6
Communist	Arthur True	1,404	2.8	+0.2
Majority		34,481	68.8	+11.0
Turnout		50,488	76.2	−3.8
Registered electors		65,787		
Labour hold		Swing		

General election 1979: Rhondda
Party	Candidate	Votes	%	±%
Labour	Alec Jones	38,007	75.2	−1.9
Conservative	Peter Leyshon	6,526	12.9	+5.4
Plaid Cymru	Glyn James	4,226	10.2	+1.9
Communist	Arthur True	1,819	3.6	+0.8
Majority		31,481	62.3	−6.5
Turnout		50,578	79.8	+3.6
Registered electors		63,412		
Labour hold		Swing		

=== Elections in the 1980s ===
General election 1983: Rhondda
Party	Candidate	Votes	%	±%
Labour	Allan Rogers	29,448	61.7	−13.5
SDP	Allan Lloyd	8,078	16.9	N/A
Plaid Cymru	Geraint Davies	4,845	10.2	±0.0
Conservative	Peter Meyer	3,973	8.3	−4.6
Communist	Arthur True	1,350	2.8	−0.8
Majority		21,370	44.8	−17.5
Turnout		47,694	76.2	−3.6
Registered electors		62,587		
Labour hold		Swing		

General election 1987: Rhondda
Party	Candidate	Votes	%	±%
Labour	Allan Rogers	35,015	73.4	+11.7
Plaid Cymru	Geraint Davies	4,261	8.9	−1.3
SDP	John York-Williams	3,930	8.2	−8.7
Conservative	Stephen Reid	3,611	7.8	−0.5
Communist	Arthur True	869	1.8	−1.0
Majority		30,754	64.5	+19.7
Turnout		47,686	78.3	+2.1
Registered electors		60,931		
Labour hold		Swing		

=== Elections in the 1990s ===
General election 1992: Rhondda
Party	Candidate	Votes	%	±%
Labour	Allan Rogers	34,243	74.5	+1.1
Plaid Cymru	Geraint Davies	5,427	11.8	+2.9
Conservative	John Richards	3,588	7.8	±0.0
Liberal Democrats	Paul Nicholls-Jones	2,431	5.3	−2.9
Communist (PCC)	Mark Fischer	245	0.5	−1.3
Majority		28,816	62.7	−1.8
Turnout		45,934	76.6	−1.7
Registered electors		59,955		
Labour hold		Swing	−0.8	

General election 1997: Rhondda
Party	Candidate	Votes	%	±%
Labour	Allan Rogers	30,381	74.5	±0.0
Plaid Cymru	Leanne Wood	5,450	13.4	+1.6
Liberal Democrats	Rodney Berman	2,307	5.7	+0.4
Conservative	Steven Whiting	1,551	3.8	−4.0
Referendum	Stephen Gardiner	658	1.6	N/A
Green	Kevin Jakeway	460	1.1	N/A
Majority		24,931	61.1	−1.6
Turnout		40,807	71.5	−5.1
Registered electors		57,105		
Labour hold		Swing	−0.8	

=== Elections in the 2000s ===
General election 2001: Rhondda
Party	Candidate	Votes	%	±%
Labour	Chris Bryant	23,230	68.3	−6.2
Plaid Cymru	Leanne Wood	7,183	21.1	+7.7
Conservative	Peter Hobbins	1,557	4.6	+0.8
Liberal Democrats	Gavin Cox	1,525	4.5	−1.2
Independent	Glyndwr Summers	507	1.5	New
Majority		16,047	47.2	−13.9
Turnout		34,002	60.6	−10.9
Registered electors		56,121		
Labour hold		Swing	−7.0	

General election 2005: Rhondda
Party	Candidate	Votes	%	±%
Labour	Chris Bryant	21,198	68.1	−0.2
Plaid Cymru	Percy Jones	4,956	15.9	−5.2
Liberal Democrats	Karen Roberts	3,264	10.5	+6.0
Conservative	Paul Stuart-Smith	1,730	5.6	+1.0
Majority		16,242	52.1	+4.9
Turnout		31,148	61.0	+0.4
Registered electors		50,461		
Labour hold		Swing	+2.5	

=== Elections in the 2010s ===
General election 2010: Rhondda
Party	Candidate	Votes	%	±%
Labour	Chris Bryant	17,183	55.3	−12.8
Plaid Cymru	Geraint Davies	5,630	18.1	+2.2
Liberal Democrats	Paul Wasley	3,309	10.6	+0.1
Independent	Philip Howe	2,599	8.4	N/A
Conservative	Juliette Henderson	1,993	6.4	+0.8
UKIP	Taffy John	359	1.2	N/A
Majority		11,553	37.2	−14.9
Turnout		31,072	60.3	−0.7
Registered electors		51,554		
Labour hold		Swing	−7.5	

General election 2015: Rhondda
Party	Candidate	Votes	%	±%
Labour	Chris Bryant	15,976	50.7	−4.6
Plaid Cymru	Shelley Rees-Owen	8,521	27.0	+8.9
UKIP	Ron Hughes	3,998	12.7	+11.5
Conservative	Lyn Hudson	2,116	6.7	+0.3
Liberal Democrats	George Summers	474	1.5	−9.1
Green	Lisa Rapado	453	1.4	N/A
Rejected ballots		56		
Majority		7,455	23.6	−13.6
Turnout		31,538	60.9	+0.6
Registered electors		51,811		
Labour hold		Swing	−6.8	

Of the 56 rejected ballots:

- 34 were either unmarked or it was uncertain who the vote was for.
- 22 voted for more than one candidate.

General election 2017: Rhondda
Party	Candidate	Votes	%	±%
Labour	Chris Bryant	21,096	64.1	+13.4
Plaid Cymru	Branwen Cennard	7,350	22.3	−4.7
Conservative	Virginia Crosbie	3,333	10.1	+3.4
UKIP	Janet Kenrick	880	2.7	−10.0
Liberal Democrats	Karen Roberts	277	0.8	−0.7
Majority		13,746	41.8	+18.2
Turnout		32,886	65.2	+4.3
Registered electors		50,514		
Labour hold		Swing	+9.1	

The seat saw the fewest Conservative votes on mainland Great Britain in 2017, 22 fewer than in Manchester Gorton; likewise as to the Liberal Democrat votes, 18 votes fewer than in Blaenau Gwent.

General election 2019: Rhondda
Party	Candidate	Votes	%	±%
Labour	Chris Bryant	16,115	54.4	−9.7
Conservative	Hannah Jarvis	4,675	15.8	+5.7
Plaid Cymru	Branwen Cennard	4,069	13.7	−8.6
Brexit Party	John Watkins	3,733	12.6	N/A
Liberal Democrats	Rodney Berman	612	2.1	+1.3
Green	Shaun Thomas	438	1.5	N/A
Majority		11,440	38.6	−3.2
Turnout		29,642	59.0	−6.2
Registered electors		50,262		
Labour hold		Swing		

== See also ==
- Rhondda (Senedd constituency)
- List of parliamentary constituencies in Mid Glamorgan
- List of parliamentary constituencies in Wales
- A map of Glamorganshire in 1885, showing its new divisions.

== Bibliography ==
- Williams, Chris (1996). Democratic Rhondda: politics and Society 1885–1951. Cardiff: University of Wales Press.
- Morgan, Kenneth O. (1960). "Democratic Politics in Glamorgan, 1884–1914". Morgannwg. 4: 5–27.
