= 1920 Rhondda West by-election =

UK parliamentary by-election

← 1918	21 December 1920	1922 →
Candidate	John	Rowlands
Party	Labour	Unionist
Popular vote	14,035	9,959
Percentage	58.5%	41.5%
MP before election
Abraham
Labour
Subsequent MP
John
Labour

The 1920 Rhondda West by-election was a parliamentary by-election held on 21 December 1920 for the British House of Commons constituency of Rhondda West in Wales.

The seat had become vacant when the constituency's Labour Member of Parliament (MP), William Abraham, resigned from Parliament. He had held the seat since its creation at the 1918 general election, when he was returned unopposed. He had been the MP for the previous Rhondda constituency from its creation for the 1885 general election.

The result of the contest was a victory for the Labour candidate, William John, who won with a majority of 4,076 votes over Gwilym Rowlands. Rowlands described himself as "Labour in the Conservative interest", but was an official Conservative Party candidate.

John represented the constituency until he retired from the House of Commons at the 1950 general election.

1920 Rhondda West by-election
Party		Candidate	Votes	%	±%
	Labour	William John	14,035	58.5	N/A
C	Unionist	Gwilym Rowlands	9,959	41.5	N/A
Majority			4,076	17.0	N/A
Turnout			23,949	70.2	N/A
Registered electors			34,203		
	Labour hold		Swing	N/A	
C indicates candidate endorsed by the coalition government.

== See also ==
- Rhondda West (UK Parliament constituency)
- 1967 Rhondda West by-election
- Rhondda
- Lists of United Kingdom by-elections
