= Iorwerth Thomas =

British politician (1895-1966)

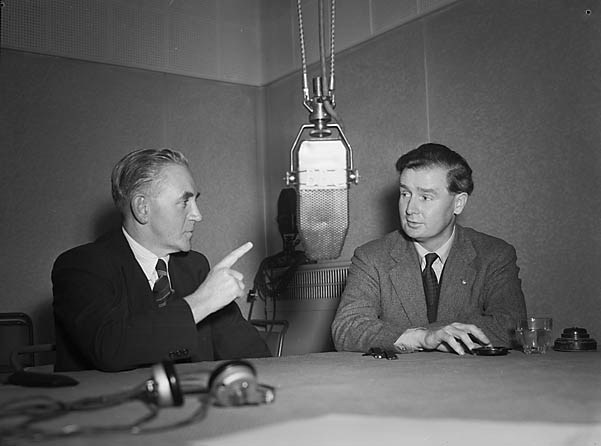
- BBC debate between Iorwerth Thomas and Gwynfor Evans

Member of Parliament for Rhondda West
- In office 23 February 1950 – 3 December 1966
- Preceded by: William John
- Succeeded by: Alec Jones

Personal details
- Born: Iorwerth Rhys Thomas; 22 January 1895 Cwmparc, Rhondda, Wales
- Died: 3 December 1966 (aged 71) Cwmparc, Rhondda, Wales
- Party: Labour
- Spouse: Annie Mary Davies (m. 1920; died 1956)
- Children: 1 son, 1 daughter
- Occupation: Miner, checkweighman

Iorwerth Rhys Thomas (22 January 1895 – 3 December 1966) was a Welsh Labour Party politician who served as Member of Parliament (MP) for Rhondda West from 1950 until his death in 1966. A former miner and trade union leader, he was a prominent figure in the South Wales Miners' Federation for over 30 years and served as chairman of Rhondda Borough Council from 1938 to 1939. In Parliament, Thomas was a consistent opponent of Welsh nationalism and the Parliament for Wales movement of the 1950s.

== Early life and education ==
Thomas was born on 22 January 1895 in Cwmparc, Rhondda, the son of David William Thomas, a self-employed greengrocer. He was educated at a local elementary school, and in 1908, at the age of 13, he began working at the Dare Colliery in Cwmparc. Despite his early entry into manual labour, Thomas was committed to self-improvement and attended evening classes in economics and history. He joined the Labour Party in 1918.

== Mining and trade union career ==
In 1922, Thomas was promoted to the position of checkweighman at Cwmparc, a role that involved ensuring fair measurement of coal output and protecting miners' interests. He became a prominent figure within the South Wales Miners' Federation and the National Union of Mineworkers, serving in these organisations for more than 30 years. Thomas held a number of offices in the Park and Dare Lodge, which was the largest miners' lodge in the South Wales coalfield.

During the 1926 coalminers' strike, Thomas played a leading role as chairman of the Park and Dare Lodge. His involvement in industrial disturbances during the strike led to his sentencing to three months' imprisonment, demonstrating his commitment to the miners' cause and willingness to face legal consequences for his trade union activities.

== Local government career ==
In 1928, Thomas was elected as a member of Rhondda Borough Council, beginning a 23-year career in local government. He demonstrated considerable administrative ability, chairing many of the council's committees and ultimately serving as chairman of the council from 1938 to 1939. He remained a member of the council until 1951, providing continuity and experience during a period of significant social and economic change in the Rhondda Valley.

Beyond local government, Thomas served on a number of joint industrial councils for Wales and Monmouthshire, reflecting his expertise in industrial relations and economic matters. From 1947 to 1949, he was a member of the South Wales Electricity Board, contributing to the post-war development of electrical infrastructure in the region.

== Parliamentary career ==
In the 1950 general election, Thomas was elected as Labour MP for Rhondda West, succeeding William John. He continued to represent the constituency until his death in 1966, serving for 16 years in Parliament. Throughout his parliamentary career, Thomas maintained a particular interest in economic and industrial matters, drawing on his extensive experience in mining and trade union affairs.

=== Political positions ===
Thomas was a consistent and vocal opponent of Welsh nationalism throughout his parliamentary career. He fought relentlessly against the Parliament for Wales movement that gained momentum during the 1950s, viewing it as contrary to the interests of working-class Wales. His opposition to Welsh nationalist politics led him to publicly attack Plaid Cymru on several occasions.

In October 1965, Thomas was highly critical of the recommendations of the Hughes-Parry Report on the Legal Status of the Welsh Language. The Hughes-Parry Report had recommended establishing the principle of equal validity for Welsh and English languages in legal proceedings and public administration, but Thomas opposed these proposals as part of his broader resistance to Welsh nationalist initiatives.

Thomas also demonstrated a pragmatic approach to social issues, supporting the Conservative government's measure in 1960 to allow public houses to open on Sundays, breaking with traditional Welsh Sunday closing laws that had been in place since the Sunday Closing (Wales) Act 1881.

== Personal life ==
In October 1920, Thomas married Annie Mary Davies, daughter of D.J. Davies. She was also active in Labour politics in the area, supporting her husband's political career and engaging in local political activities. The couple had one son and one daughter. Annie Mary died in July 1956, ten years before her husband.

== Death ==
Thomas died on 3 December 1966 at the age of 71 at his home at 94 Park Road, Cwmparc, Rhondda. His death created a vacancy in the Rhondda West constituency, leading to the 1967 by-election in which his former political agent, Alec Jones, was elected as his successor.

Parliament of the United Kingdom
Preceded by William John	Member of Parliament for Rhondda West; 1950–1966	Succeeded by Alec Jones
