= 1967 Rhondda West by-election =

UK parliamentary by-election

The 1967 Rhondda West by-election was a parliamentary by-election held on 9 March 1967 for the British House of Commons constituency of Rhondda West in Wales.

The seat had become vacant when the constituency's Labour Member of Parliament (MP), Iorwerth Thomas, died on 3 December 1966, aged 71. He had held the seat since the 1950 general election.

The result of the contest was a victory for the Labour candidate, Alec Jones, who won with a majority of 2,306 over Plaid Cymru's H. Vic Davies.

Jones represented the constituency until his death in March 1983. No by-election was held because of the imminence of the 1983 general election.

1967 Rhondda West by-election
Party	Candidate	Votes	%	±%
Labour	Alec Jones	12,373	49.0	−27.1
Plaid Cymru	Henry Vic Davies	10,067	39.9	+31.2
Communist	Arthur True	1,723	6.8	−0.6
Conservative	Gareth Neale	1,075	4.3	−3.5
Majority		2,306	9.1	−58.3
Turnout		25,238	82.2	+1.9
Registered electors		30,692		
Labour hold		Swing	-29.1	

== See also ==
- Rhondda West (UK Parliament constituency)
- 1920 Rhondda West by-election
- Rhondda
- Lists of United Kingdom by-elections
