= Rhondda East =

UK Parliament constituency (1918–1974)

- Former borough constituency for the House of Commons

1918–1974
- Seats: One
- Created from: Rhondda and South Glamorganshire
- Replaced by: Rhondda

Rhondda East was a parliamentary constituency which returned one Member of Parliament (MP) to the House of Commons of the Parliament of the United Kingdom from 1918 until 1974. Along with Rhondda West it was formed by dividing the old Rhondda constituency.

== History ==
Rhondda East was for a time a heartland of the Communist Party of Great Britain, who formed the main opposition on the council. For a time, Annie Powell was the only Communist mayor in Britain. Harry Pollitt, General Secretary of the CPGB, narrowly failed to win the seat in 1945.

== Boundaries ==
1918–1949: The Urban District of Rhondda seventh, eighth, ninth, and tenth wards, and part of the sixth.

1950–1974: The Urban District of Rhondda seventh, eighth, ninth, tenth, and eleventh wards, and part of the sixth.

== Members of Parliament ==
Election	Member	Party
1918	David Watts-Morgan	Labour
1933 by-election	William Mainwaring	Labour
1959	Elfed Davies	Labour
Feb 1974	constituency abolished: see Rhondda	

== Election results ==
=== Elections in the 1910s ===
General election 1918: Rhondda East
Party	Candidate	Votes	%	±%
Labour	David Watts-Morgan	Unopposed		
Registered electors				
Labour hold				

=== Elections in the 1920s ===
General election 1922: Rhondda East
Party	Candidate	Votes	%	±%
Labour	David Watts-Morgan	17,146	55.0	N/A
National Liberal	Frederick William Heale	14,025	45.0	New
Majority		3,121	10.0	N/A
Turnout		31,171	80.9	N/A
Labour hold		Swing		

General election 1923: Rhondda East
Party	Candidate	Votes	%	±%
Labour	David Watts-Morgan	21,338	71.9	+16.9
Unionist	Alfred John Orchard	8,346	28.1	New
Majority		12,992	43.8	+33.8
Turnout		29,684	74.6	−6.3
Labour hold		Swing		

General election 1924: Rhondda East
Party	Candidate	Votes	%	±%
Labour	David Watts-Morgan	Unopposed		
Registered electors				
Labour hold				

General election 1929: Rhondda East
Party	Candidate	Votes	%	±%
Labour	David Watts Morgan	19,010	50.2	N/A
Liberal	Richard David Chalke	10,269	27.0	New
Communist	Arthur Horner	5,789	15.2	New
Unionist	John Francis Powell	2,901	7.6	New
Majority		8,741	23.2	N/A
Turnout		37,969	84.7	N/A
Labour hold		Swing	N/A	

=== Elections in the 1930s ===
General election 1931: Rhondda East
Party	Candidate	Votes	%	±%
Labour	David Watts-Morgan	22,086	68.1	+17.9
Communist	Arthur Horner	10,359	31.9	+16.7
Majority		11,727	36.2	+13.0
Turnout		32,445	73.7	−11.0
Labour hold		Swing		

1933 Rhondda East by-election
Party	Candidate	Votes	%	±%
Labour	William Mainwaring	14,127	42.5	−25.6
Communist	Arthur Horner	11,228	33.8	+1.9
Liberal	William Thomas	7,851	23.6	New
Majority		2,899	8.7	−27.5
Turnout		33,206	74.9	+1.2
Labour hold		Swing		

General election 1935: Rhondda East
Party	Candidate	Votes	%	±%
Labour	William Mainwaring	22,088	61.8	−6.3
Communist	Harry Pollitt	13,655	38.2	+6.3
Majority		8,433	23.6	−12.6
Turnout		35,743	80.8	+6.1
Labour hold		Swing		

=== Elections in the 1940s ===
General election 1945: Rhondda East
Party	Candidate	Votes	%	±%
Labour	William Mainwaring	16,733	48.4	−13.4
Communist	Harry Pollitt	15,761	45.5	+7.3
Plaid Cymru	James Kitchener Davies	2,123	6.1	New
Majority		972	2.9	−20.7
Turnout		34,617	82.8	+2.0
Labour hold		Swing	−10.3	

=== Elections in the 1950s ===
General election 1950: Rhondda East
Party	Candidate	Votes	%	±%
Labour	William Mainwaring	26,645	75.9	+26.5
Communist	Harry Pollitt	4,463	12.7	−32.8
Conservative	George Nicholls	2,634	7.5	New
Plaid Cymru	David Davies	1,357	3.9	−2.2
Majority		22,182	63.2	+60.3
Turnout		35,099	87.5	+4.7
Labour hold		Swing	+29.7	

General election 1951: Rhondda East
Party	Candidate	Votes	%	±%
Labour	William Mainwaring	27,958	81.2	+5.3
Conservative	Oliver Stutchbury	3,522	10.3	+2.8
Communist	Idris Cox	2,948	8.6	−4.1
Majority		24,436	70.9	+7.7
Turnout		34,428	85.5	−2.0
Labour hold		Swing	+1.8	

General election 1955: Rhondda East
Party	Candidate	Votes	%	±%
Labour	William Mainwaring	21,859	72.6	−8.6
Communist	Annie Powell	4,544	15.1	+6.5
Conservative	Herbert R Rowlands	3,711	12.3	+2.0
Majority		17,315	57.5	−13.4
Turnout		30,114	85.5	0.0
Labour hold		Swing	−7.6	

General election 1959: Rhondda East
Party	Candidate	Votes	%	±%
Labour	Elfed Davies	20,565	65.2	−7.4
Communist	Annie Powell	4,580	14.5	−0.6
Conservative	David Peace	3,629	11.5	−0.8
Plaid Cymru	Noel Williams	2,776	8.8	New
Majority		15,985	50.7	−6.8
Turnout		31,550	83.2	−2.3
Labour hold		Swing	−3.4	

=== Elections in the 1960s ===
General election 1964: Rhondda East
Party	Candidate	Votes	%	±%
Labour	Elfed Davies	20,510	71.2	+6.0
Communist	Annie Powell	3,385	11.8	−2.7
Conservative	David Purnell	2,548	8.9	−2.6
Plaid Cymru	Glyn P James	2,361	8.2	−0.6
Majority		17,125	59.4	+8.7
Turnout		28,804	79.5	−3.7
Labour hold		Swing	+4.4	

General election 1966: Rhondda East
Party	Candidate	Votes	%	±%
Labour	Elfed Davies	21,567	77.4	+2.2
Communist	Annie Powell	2,349	8.4	−3.4
Plaid Cymru	Glyn Pryce James	2,088	7.5	−0.7
Conservative	William Kenneth R. Ricketts	1,857	6.7	−2.2
Majority		19,218	69.0	+9.6
Turnout		27,861	78.5	−1.0
Labour hold		Swing	+2.7	

=== Elections in the 1970s ===
General election 1970: Rhondda East
Party	Candidate	Votes	%	±%
Labour	Elfed Davies	19,602	68.7	−8.7
Plaid Cymru	Glyn Pryce James	6,931	24.3	+16.8
Conservative	Richard C. Mullett	1,359	4.8	−1.9
Communist	Arthur Jones	659	2.3	−6.1
Majority		12,671	44.4	−24.6
Turnout		28,551	77.4	−1.1
Labour hold		Swing	−12.8	

== See also ==
- 1933 Rhondda East by-election

== Sources ==
- Leigh Rayment's Historical List of MPs – Constituencies beginning with "H" (part 3)
- http://www.psr.keele.ac.uk/ (Election results from 1951 to the present)
- F. W. S. Craig, British Parliamentary Election Results 1918 - 1949
- F. W. S. Craig, British Parliamentary Election Results 1950 - 1970
