= William Mainwaring =

Welsh miner and politician (1884–1971)

William Henry Mainwaring (1884 – 18 May 1971) was a Welsh coal miner, lecturer and trade unionist, who became a long-serving Labour Party Member of Parliament. Both as a trade unionist and a politician he struggled, largely successfully to counter Communist influence. He was said to have spoken "with passion and fire on behalf of his fellow miners".

== Mining ==
Mainwaring was born in Swansea and went to local schools, leaving to work as miner in the South Wales coalfield. He was a member of the South Wales Miners' Federation, and through their sponsorship was able to continue his education at the Central Labour College in London where he studied economics.

== Labour College lecturer ==
After two years at the college, he returned to the coal face, but in 1919, Mainwaring was appointed as a lecturer in Economics and Vice-Principal of the Central Labour College. This college, which renamed as The Labour College in 1920, was founded by the South Wales Miners' Federation and the National Union of Railwaymen, but most of the students were South Wales miners; opponents suspected the college was "class teaching for revolutionary aims".

== Miners' agent ==
Mainwaring ran for the South Wales nomination for a candidate to be Secretary of the Miners Federation of Great Britain in 1924, but was narrowly defeated by A. J. Cook. Mainwaring polled 49,617 against Cook's 50,123 votes. Cook went on to win the post and vacated his previous post as miners' agent for the Rhondda district; Mainwaring was appointed to succeed him. He was one of two agents for the district, and with his fellow agent Alderman David Lewis, Mainwaring had to fight the attempts by members of the Communist Party of Great Britain to gain influence. In 1928, under Communist influence, the lodges of the Rhondda Miners' Federation called for a membership ballot to elect their representative on the South Wales Miners' Federation executive. Mainwaring and Lewis offered their resignations but the district committee refused to accept them.

=== Industrial dispute ===
After a new law allowed the miners' working day to increase to 7½ hours, the South Wales coalowners decided to reduce the wages of miners in November 1930. Mainwaring declared that the new terms of employment were "absolutely preposterous" and threatened to lead a strike. However, after lengthy negotiations, the South Wales miners agreed to work under the new terms "under protest". Communists picketed the Lewis Merthyr colliery at Trehafod in Rhondda, and nearly half of the men did not go in to work.

Mainwaring did get the South Wales nomination for the secretaryship of the Miners' Federation of Great Britain in 1932, after the death of A. J. Cook. A preferential voting system was used, and Mainwaring came in third place on first preference votes, being eliminated from the voting.

== Rhondda East byelection ==
The death of Lieutenant-Colonel David Watts-Morgan, the Labour Member of Parliament (MP) for Rhondda East, in early 1933 left a vacancy for a Labour candidate in which the influence of the miners was predominant. Mainwaring's name was immediately mentioned as a possible candidate, with rivals including Alderman David Lewis, Mrs Watts-Morgan (the widow of the former MP), and some local party figures. Mainwaring was selected, and faced opposition from Arthur Horner of the Communist Party and William Thomas, a local Liberal, in the byelection.

Mainwaring received a letter of support from Labour Party leader George Lansbury, and an appeal from the President, vice-president and General Secretary of the South Wales Miners' Federation was made for all miners and their families to vote for him. The Labour Party had won easily in a straight fight with Arthur Horner at the previous election, but the decision of the Liberal Party to fight an energetic campaign (the Liberal candidate was allied with David Lloyd George and opposed to the National Government) was thought to have given the party a scare because Labour had benefited from Liberal votes in 1931. Mainwaring predicted that he would get between 20,000 and 22,000 votes. In the event, Mainwaring won with 14,127 votes, with Horner second having increased his vote compared with 1931.

== Parliament ==
In Parliament, Mainwaring concentrated on mining issues, calling in July 1933 for the Home Secretary to examine the circumstances of the Bedwas colliery dispute where miners and their families had been imprisoned for breaches of the peace. He moved the rejection of the government's Coal Mines Bill in 1934, arguing that legislation dealing with coal mines was futile while the mines were in private ownership, and had evaded previous acts. He was also active on issues affecting the unemployed, where he consistently opposed attempts to reduce unemployment benefit; in 1935 he warned that agitation on the subject in South Wales would "spread like a flame throughout the country".

=== Arms industry ===
During the 1930s he was a pacifist, criticising private armament firms for "trafficking in the blood of nations". Mainwaring also moved to delete a provision which would criminalise possession of documents which if distributed to the armed forces would incite disaffection, pointing to the fact that some parts of holy scripture might be included within the description and declaring his certainty that his own possessions included enough to keep him in prison forever. He also moved a motion in 1936 that called for the government to be given full power to take action against profiteers in the event of war; this motion was agreed.

At the 1935 general election, Mainwaring had to defend his seat against the Communist leader Harry Pollitt. The Communists caused some amusement when they appealed to Labour to withdraw their candidate to stop splitting the working-class vote. Mainwaring succeeded in increasing his majority to 8,433.

=== Employment law ===
In the new Parliament, Mainwaring won sixth place on the ballot to introduce a Private Member's Bill and chose to try to make employers liable for injuries to workmen caused by the negligence of fellow workmen. When debated, a Conservative MP moved to reject the Bill, and the Government declared their opposition; the Bill was defeated by 146 to 85. In the next session, Mainwaring won again, this time in first place; he introduced the Workmen's Compensation Bill, which aimed to compensate more dependents of employees for injuries caused in the workplace. He was again met with a motion for rejection which was passed by only six votes (115 to 109).

=== Unemployment ===
Mainwaring organised a march of the unemployed from South Wales to Westminster in November 1936, calling for work. When the Minister of Labour went in a delegation to South Wales to unveil charity gifts, Mainwaring urged the people of South Wales to refuse to meet them and to "turn the insult back in their faces". He criticised the Government for failing to direct industry to the "Special areas" in South Wales suffering unemployment, pointing to statistics which showed they had been developed elsewhere.

=== Rhodesia ===
Outside his normal area, Mainwaring was named as a member of the Royal Commission on Rhodesia in 1938. He went on a long visit to the territories in August 1938 to gather evidence, and then went on to visit the Rand in South Africa. Mainwaring endorsed the report of the Royal Commission which called for a single Governor for the three territories of Northern Rhodesia, Southern Rhodesia and Nyasaland.

=== Wartime ===
During the wartime coalition, Mainwaring was not always prepared to go along with the Labour Party's alliance with the Conservatives. He supported an amendment to criticise the poor position of old age and widow pensioners in 1942, along with 48 other Labour MPs but against the wishes of the front bench. He also voted to criticise the Government for delaying implementation of the Beveridge Report in February 1943.

== 1945 general election ==
At the 1945 general election, Mainwaring faced a tough fight against Harry Pollitt who had kept up his connection with the Rhondda East constituency. Although the Liberal Party did not field a candidate, the Welsh nationalists of Plaid Cymru did. Senior Labour figures including Professor Harold Laski spoke for Mainwaring, who was put under pressure by the Communists' identifying with the working class while the Labour national campaign made a bid for middle-class votes.

=== Civil aviation ===
Mainwaring succeeded in winning a very narrow victory by 972 votes. He was a notably less frequent speaker in the post-war Parliaments, but kept up his allegiance to the left. In 1946 he broke with the whip to support an amendment to the Civil Aviation Bill which required the directors of the new airline corporations to be full-time, and to oppose a Lords amendment affecting the Air Traffic Advisory Council. However Mainwaring opposed an amendment to exclude men from Wales and Monmouthshire from the liability to do National Service, declaring that "no decent man or woman in Wales would support the amendment".

== Korean war ==
At the 1950 general election, Harry Pollitt made his third challenge to win the Rhondda East constituency. However, the outbreak of the Cold War against Soviet Union was thought to have alienated many in the coalfield. At the poll, Mainwaring obtained a majority of 22,182 and Pollitt barely retained his deposit. Mainwaring was a strong supporter of the Government policy of fighting the Korean War, which he declared to be in the interests of workers of Britain.

== Welsh nationalism ==
Mainwaring became a staunch opponent of Welsh nationalism. In 1955 he denounced the assumption that the English "were in some peculiar way wholly foreign and alien to Wales", and ridiculed basing a nation on "poets, preachers and musicians". He supported reform of the system of leasehold ownership to allow leasehold tenants to buy their freeholds, attacking the sale of estates to financiers.

== Personal life ==
Married housewife Jessie Emily Lizette Hazell (1881–1950) in 1914. They had one daughter, Joyce, in 1919.

== Retirement ==
After being little active in his last Parliament, Mainwaring announced his retirement a year before the 1959 general election. He lived to the age of 87.

Parliament of the United Kingdom
Preceded by Lt.-Col. David Watts-Morgan	Member of Parliament for Rhondda East; 1933 – 1959	Succeeded by Elfed Davies
Trade union offices
Preceded by A. J. Cook and David Lewis	Agent for the Rhondda District of the South Wales Miners' Federation; 1922–1933; With: David Lewis	Succeeded by W. H. May
