= Rhondda West =

UK Parliament constituency (1918–1974)

- Former borough constituency for the House of Commons

1918–1974
- Seats: One
- Created from: Rhondda and Mid Glamorganshire
- Replaced by: Rhondda

Rhondda West was a parliamentary constituency centred on the Rhondda district of Wales. It returned one Member of Parliament (MP) to the House of Commons of the Parliament of the United Kingdom, elected by the first past the post system. Along with Rhondda East it was formed by dividing the old Rhondda constituency.

== History ==
The constituency was created for the 1918 general election, and abolished for the February 1974 general election.

== Boundaries ==
Throughout its existence the constituency included the towns of Treorchy and Tonypandy.

1918–1974: The Urban District of Rhondda first, second, third, fourth, and fifth wards, and part of the sixth.

== Members of Parliament ==
Election	Member	Party
1918	William Abraham	Labour
1920 by-election	William John	Labour
1950	Iorwerth Thomas	Labour
1967 by-election	Alec Jones	Labour
Feb 1974	constituency abolished: see Rhondda	

== Election results ==
=== Elections in the 1910s ===
General election 1918: West Rhondda
Party	Candidate	Votes	%	±%
Labour	William Abraham	Unopposed		
Registered electors				
Labour win (new seat)				

=== Elections in the 1920s ===
1920 Rhondda West by-election
Party		Candidate	Votes	%	±%
	Labour	William John	14,035	58.5	N/A
C	Unionist	Gwilym Rowlands	9,959	41.5	New
Majority			4,076	17.0	N/A
Turnout			23,949	70.2	N/A
	Labour hold		Swing	N/A	
C indicates candidate endorsed by the coalition government.

General election 1922: Rhondda West
Party	Candidate	Votes	%	±%
Labour	William John	18,001	62.1	+3.6
Unionist	Gwilym Rowlands	10,990	37.9	−3.6
Majority		7,011	24.2	+7.2
Turnout		28,991	83.7	+13.5
Labour hold		Swing	+3.6	

General election 1923: Rhondda West
Party	Candidate	Votes	%	±%
Labour	William John	18,206	65.4	+3.3
Liberal	John Robert Jones	9,640	34.6	New
Majority		8,566	30.8	+6.6
Turnout		27,846	78.5	−5.2
Labour hold		Swing		

General election 1924: West Rhondda
Party	Candidate	Votes	%	±%
Labour	William John	Unopposed		
Registered electors				
Labour hold				

General election 1929: Rhondda West
Party	Candidate	Votes	%	±%
Labour	William John	23,238	65.1	N/A
Liberal	Moelwyn Hughes	9,247	25.9	New
Unionist	Wilfred Augustus Prichard	3,210	9.0	New
Majority		13,991	39.2	N/A
Turnout		35,695	86.7	N/A
Labour hold		Swing	N/A	

=== Elections in the 1930s ===
General election 1931: Rhondda West
Party	Candidate	Votes	%	±%
Labour	William John	23,024	84.3	+19.2
Communist	John Leigh Davies	4,296	15.7	New
Majority		18,728	68.6	+21.4
Turnout		27,320	66.7	−20.0
Registered electors		40,950		
Labour hold		Swing	+19.2	

General election 1935: Rhondda West
Party	Candidate	Votes	%	±%
Labour	William John	Unopposed		
Labour hold				
Registered electors		41,032		

=== Elections in the 1940s ===
General election 1945: Rhondda West
Party	Candidate	Votes	%	±%
Labour	William John	Unopposed		
Labour hold				
Registered electors		39,652		

This was the last occasion in the United Kingdom when a seat saw a walkover at a general election outside Northern Ireland and not as a result of a by-election; the other being Liverpool Scotland. Both seats returned a Labour MP unopposed in the 1945 general election.

=== Elections in the 1950s ===
General election 1950: Rhondda West
Party	Candidate	Votes	%	±%
Labour	Iorwerth Thomas	27,150	82.37	N/A
Conservative	JP Driscoll	3,632	11.02	New
Plaid Cymru	James Kitchener Davies	2,183	6.62	New
Majority		23,518	71.35	N/A
Turnout		32,965	87.94	N/A
Registered electors		37,484		
Labour hold		Swing	N/A	

General election 1951: Rhondda West
Party	Candidate	Votes	%	±%
Labour	Iorwerth Thomas	26,123	81.06	−1.31
Conservative	E Simons	3,635	11.02	0.00
Plaid Cymru	James Kitchener Davies	2,467	7.66	+1.04
Majority		22,488	69.78	−1.57
Turnout		32,225	86.36	−1.58
Registered electors		37,315		
Labour hold		Swing	-0.79	

General election 1955: Rhondda West
Party	Candidate	Votes	%	±%
Labour	Iorwerth Thomas	21,288	73.80	−7.26
Plaid Cymru	Glyndwr Powell James	4,424	15.34	+7.68
Conservative	Charles PT Burke	3,134	10.86	−0.16
Majority		16,864	58.46	−11.32
Turnout		28,846	80.25	−6.11
Registered electors		35,943		
Labour hold		Swing	-7.47	

General election 1959: Rhondda West
Party	Candidate	Votes	%	±%
Labour	Iorwerth Thomas	21,130	71.99	−1.81
Plaid Cymru	Glyndwr Powell James	4,978	16.96	+1.62
Conservative	Francis Pym	3,242	11.05	+0.19
Majority		16,152	55.03	−3.43
Turnout		29,350	85.20	+4.95
Registered electors		34,450		
Labour hold		Swing	-1.72	

=== Elections in the 1960s ===
General election 1964: Rhondda West
Party	Candidate	Votes	%	±%
Labour	Iorwerth Thomas	20,713	79.3	+7.3
Conservative	Norman Lloyd-Edwards	2,754	10.5	−0.5
Plaid Cymru	Henry Victor Davies	2,668	10.2	−6.8
Majority		17,959	68.8	+13.8
Turnout		26,135	80.7	−4.5
Registered electors		32,401		
Labour hold		Swing	+3.89	

General election 1966: Rhondda West
Party	Candidate	Votes	%	±%
Labour	Iorwerth Thomas	19,060	76.12	−3.13
Plaid Cymru	Henry Victor Davies	2,172	8.67	−1.54
Conservative	Bryan Sandford-Hill	1,955	7.81	−2.73
Communist	Arthur True	1,853	7.40	New
Majority		16,888	67.45	−1.29
Turnout		25,040	80.28	−0.38
Registered electors		31,189		
Labour hold		Swing	-0.80	

By-election 1967: Rhondda West
Party	Candidate	Votes	%	±%
Labour	Alec Jones	12,373	49.0	−27.1
Plaid Cymru	Henry Victor Davies	10,067	39.9	+31.2
Communist	Arthur True	1,723	6.8	−0.6
Conservative	Gareth Neale	1,075	4.3	−3.5
Majority		2,306	9.1	−58.3
Turnout		25,238	82.2	−1.9
Labour hold		Swing	−29.1	

=== Elections in the 1970s ===
General election 1970: Rhondda West
Party	Candidate	Votes	%	±%
Labour	Alec Jones	18,779	74.8	−1.3
Plaid Cymru	Henry Victor Davies	3,528	14.1	+5.4
Conservative	John D. Morgan	1,610	6.4	−1.4
Communist	Arthur True	1,201	4.8	−2.6
Majority		15,251	60.7	−6.7
Turnout		25,118	81.4	+1.1
Registered electors		30,854		
Labour hold		Swing	−3.4	

== See also ==
- 1920 Rhondda West by-election
- 1967 Rhondda West by-election
