= Campbell Case =

1924 British political scandal

J.R. Campbell, circa 1924.

The Campbell Case of 1924 involved charges against a British communist newspaper editor, J. R. Campbell, for alleged "incitement to mutiny" caused by his publication of a provocative open letter to members of the military. The decision of the government of British Prime Minister Ramsay MacDonald, who later suspended prosecution of the case ostensibly because of pressure from backbenchers in his Labour Party, proved to be instrumental in bringing down the short-lived first Labour government.

In October 1925, after a number of posters had appeared that advocated the formation of soldiers' and sailors' committees and denounced the use of troops against workers, further articles in issues of the Workers' Weekly, dated 7 and 14 August 1925, called for members of the military to resist orders ("If you must shoot, don't shoot the workers"). That caused the newly appointed Attorney General Douglas Hogg, with the overt encouragement of the Home Secretary, William Joynson Hicks, to authorise a fresh prosecution under the Incitement to Mutiny Act 1797. The new round of prosecutions embroiled not only Campbell but also eleven other members of the Communist Party, Willie Gallacher, Wal Hannington, Albert Inkpin, Harry Pollitt, William Rust, R. Page Arnot, Tom Bell, Ernest Cant, Arthur MacManus, J. T. Murphy and Tom Wintringham.

== Background ==
J. R. Campbell was the acting editor of Workers Weekly, a newspaper of the Communist Party of Great Britain (CPGB). In its 25 July 1924 edition, the paper contained a provocative article for the "Anti-War Week Campaign" being conducted by the party, "An Open Letter to the Fighting Forces." The article read in part:

Comrades:

You never joined the Army or Navy because you were in love with warfare, or because you were attracted to the glamour of the uniform. In nine cases out of ten you were compelled to join the services after a long fight against poverty and misery caused by prolonged unemployment…

Repressive regulations and irksome restrictions are intentionally imposed upon you. And when war is declared you are supposed to be filled with a longing to "beat the enemy." The enemy consists of working men like yourselves, living under the same slave conditions…

Soldiers, sailors, airmen, flesh of our flesh and bone of our bone, the Communist Party calls upon you to begin the task of not only organising passive resistance when war is declared, or when an industrial dispute involves you, but to definitely and categorically let it be known that, neither in the class war nor a military war, will you turn your guns on your fellow workers, but instead will line up with your fellow workers in an attack upon the exploiters and capitalists, and will use your arms on the side of your own class…

Refuse to shoot down your fellow workers!

Refuse to fight for profits!

Turn your weapons on your oppressors!"

— Workers Weekly

== Withdrawal of first indictment ==
On 6 August, it was announced in the British House of Commons that the Attorney General for England and Wales, Sir Patrick Hastings, had advised the prosecution of Campbell under the Incitement to Mutiny Act 1797 but pressure from a number of Labour backbenchers had forced the government to withdraw the charges on 13 August. Along with allegations of pro-Soviet activity, that allowed the Liberals and the Conservatives to brand Labour as under the control of radical left-wing groups.

Although the actual motion of censure moved by Sir Robert Horne MP in the terms "That the conduct of His Majesty's Government in relation to the institution and subsequent withdrawal of criminal proceedings against the editor of the 'Workers' Weekly' is deserving of the censure of this House" was expressly rejected by 198 votes to 359, an alternative motion, proposed by Sir John Simon MP, "That a Select Committee be appointed to investigate and report upon the circumstances leading up to the withdrawal of the proceedings recently instituted by the Director of Public Prosecutions against Mr. Campbell", was passed by 364 to 198.

The government, however, had made clear that it regarded both motions as votes of confidence and so British Prime Minister Ramsay MacDonald requested and obtained a dissolution the following day. It would be the largest government defeat in the House of Commons until the Brexit vote on 16 January 2019. Later, the 1924 general election was called, which Labour lost to a majority Conservative government.

== Fall of MacDonald government ==
In a pamphlet published after the fall of the MacDonald government, the Communist Party published a message by Campbell defending his decision to publish the aggressive anti-militarist articles that he did in the Workers Weekly:

...[T]he Communist Party of Great Britain had to call attention to the fact that the Labour Government, while talking of its attachment to the cause of peace, was continuing the policy of previous imperialist governments. We had to expose to the Labour movement the true nature of this policy and to ask the Labour movement, if it was sincerely opposed to war, to fight war by all the means in its power.

On the question of armaments, we advocated the policy of no credits for capitalist armaments.

On the question of empire, we advocated that the Labour movement should force the government to abandon the brutal and cowardly repression of the struggling colonial peoples.

We asserted that the Labour Government could prove its attachment to peace in a practical fashion, by publishing the secret treaties and the secret war plans in the archives of the Foreign and War Offices.

== Trial and conviction on new charges ==
A year later, in October 1925, after a number of posters had appeared that advocated the formation of soldiers' and sailors' committees and denounced the use of troops against workers, further articles in issues of the Workers' Weekly, dated 7 and 14 August 1925, called for members of the military to resist orders ("If you must shoot, don't shoot the workers"). That caused the newly appointed Attorney General Douglas Hogg, with the overt encouragement of the Home Secretary, William Joynson Hicks, to authorise a fresh prosecution under the Incitement to Mutiny Act 1797.

The new round of prosecutions embroiled not only Campbell but also eleven other members of the Communist Party, Willie Gallacher, Wal Hannington, Albert Inkpin, Harry Pollitt, William Rust, R. Page Arnot, Tom Bell, Ernest Cant, Arthur MacManus, J. T. Murphy and Tom Wintringham. The defendants were charged with "conspiring between 1st January 1924 and 21st October 1925 to

1. utter and publish seditious libels;
2. to incite persons to commit breaches of the Incitement to Mutiny Act 1797; and
3. to endeavour to seduce from their duty persons serving in HM Forces to whom might come certain publications, to wit Workers Weekly, and others, and to incite them to mutiny".

After an eight-day trial at the Old Bailey all of the defendants were convicted. Those with prior convictions Gallacher, Hannington, Inkpin, Pollitt and Rust being given sentences of twelve months imprisonment, and Campbell and the others received terms of six months. Those receiving the lesser term had all refused an offer by the judge of a non-custodial sentence in return for a declaration that they would not engage in further political activities similar to those which formed the basis of the charges.

== See also ==
- Communist Party of Great Britain
- Zinoviev Letter

== Sources ==
- "A Barrister", Justice in England. Left Book Club edition. London: Victor Gollancz,1938.
- David Williams, Not in the Public Interest, London: Hutchinson, 1965.
