= Workers' Weekly =

Workers' Weekly may refer to:

- Workers' Weekly (UK), newspaper by the Communist Party of Great Britain 1923–1927
- Workers' Weekly (Australia), newspaper by the Communist Party of Australia 1923–1939
