= J. R. Campbell (communist) =

British communist activist and newspaper editor

J. R. Campbell MM

2nd General Secretary of the Communist Party of Great Britain (Note: Campbell held the title of 'Political Secretary' from July 1928 to February 1929, and in May 1929, when he became subordinate to his successor, Harry Pollitt.)
- In office February 1929 – May 1929
- Preceded by: Albert Inkpin
- Succeeded by: Harry Pollitt

Personal details
- Born: John Ross Campbell; 15 October 1894 Paisley, Scotland
- Died: 18 September 1969 (aged 74)
- Party: Communist Party of Great Britain
- Occupation: Editor of Workers' Weekly
- Known for: Co-founder of the CPGB; Principal in the Campbell Case

John Ross Campbell MM (14 October 1894 – 18 September 1969) was a British communist activist and newspaper editor. Campbell was a co-founder of the Communist Party of Great Britain and briefly served as its second leader from July 1928 to July 1929. He is best remembered as the principal in the Campbell Case. In 1924, Campbell was charged under the Incitement to Mutiny Act for an article published in the paper Workers' Weekly. The article called on British soldiers to "let it be known that, neither in the class war nor in a military war, will you turn your guns on your fellow workers, but instead will line up with your fellow workers in an attack upon the exploiters and capitalists." He was sentenced to six months in prison.

The decision by the Labour government of Prime Minister Ramsay MacDonald to withdraw prosecution of Campbell lead to the loss of a confidence vote in the House of Commons, forcing the elections which ended the first Labour government in October 1924. Campbell remained a top leader and leading public figure associated with the CPGB from the 1920s to the 1960s.

== Early years ==
Campbell was born on 15 October 1894 in Paisley, Scotland. He joined the British Socialist Party in 1912. During the First World War, he served in the Royal Naval Division and was wounded in active service. He suffered multiple gunshot wounds, as well as contracting gangrene in the front-line trenches of the battle of the Somme, requiring amputation of both feet to the instep. He was awarded the Military Medal for bravery in battle.

Following the war, Campbell returned to Scotland and was active in the Clyde Workers' Committee. From 1921 to 1924 he edited its newspaper, The Worker. He followed the British Socialist Party into the newly formed Communist Party of Great Britain (CPGB), of which he was a founding member, and served on its Central Committee from its re-organisation in 1923.

Campbell and his close associate Willie Gallacher were joint secretaries of the British Bureau of the Red International of Labour Unions, with Tom Mann chairman of the organisation.

== The Campbell Case of 1924 ==
In 1924, Campbell moved to London to become acting editor of the CPGB's Workers' Weekly newspaper. On 25 July 1924, Campbell published an article entitled "An Open Letter to Fighting Forces", which called on the armed forces to unite to form "the nucleus of an organisation that will prepare the whole of the soldiers, sailors and airmen, not merely to refuse to go to war, or to refuse to shoot strikers during industrial conflicts, but will make it possible for the workers, peasants and soldiers and airmen to go forward in a common attack upon the capitalists and smash capitalism for ever, and institute the reign of the whole working class." The article, written anonymously by Harry Pollitt, together with a similar article published on 1 August 1924, was the basis for Campbell being charged under the Incitement to Mutiny Act 1797.

This became known as the "Campbell Case", and when the first Labour government dropped the prosecution, the combined Conservative and Liberal Party opposition won a vote of no confidence, which in turn led to the 1924 general election.

Campbell defended the Communist Party's decision to publish the aggressive articles in a pamphlet published late in 1924:

... [T]he Communist Party of Great Britain had to call attention to the fact that the Labour Government, while talking of its attachment to the cause of peace, was continuing the policy of previous imperialist governments. We had to expose to the Labour movement the true nature of this policy and to ask the Labour movement, if it was sincerely opposed to war, to fight war by all the means in its power.

On the question of armaments, we advocated the policy of no credits for capitalist armaments.

On the question of empire, we advocated that the Labour movement should force the government to abandon the brutal and cowardly repression of the struggling colonial peoples.

We asserted that the Labour Government could prove its attachment to peace in a practical fashion, by publishing the secret treaties and the secret war plans in the archives of the Foreign and War Offices.

== Later political career ==
In 1925, Campbell was one of twelve members of the Communist Party convicted at the Old Bailey under the Incitement to Mutiny Act. He was sentenced to six months in prison, but was released before the UK general strike of May 1926.

Campbell was elected to the Executive Committee of the Communist International in 1928, and used the opportunity to argue against its hostility to joint work with the Labour Party.

During the 1930s, Campbell was one of the public figures most closely identified with the CPGB in the public eye, along with Harry Pollitt and Willie Gallacher.

In 1931, he unsuccessfully fought a by-election in the safe Labour seat of Ogmore in Wales, and would fight the same seat in the 1931 general election, this time finishing in third place to the Conservatives.

In 1932, Campbell became the foreign editor of the CPGB's Daily Worker newspaper, then later in the decade became its assistant editor, and in 1939 served briefly as its editor. In that same year, he published Soviet Policy and Its Critics, largely a defence of the Moscow Trials, having spent a year in Moscow observing the events.

On 3 September 1939, Prime Minister Neville Chamberlain spoke to the nation on the BBC, announcing the declaration of war between Britain and Nazi Germany. Along with CPGB leader Harry Pollitt, Campbell sought to portray the conflict against Hitler as a continuation of the anti-fascist fight. However, backed with the knowledge of the details of the Molotov–Ribbentrop Pact and seeking to preserve the Soviet Union by turning Hitler's attention to Western Europe, the Comintern quickly signalled that the conflict was to be portrayed by the world communist movement as an "Imperialist War" between two more or less equally culpable blocs of capitalist nations.

Pollitt and Campbell remained opposed to this interpretation of the conflict. On 2 and 3 October the governing Central Committee of the CPGB met and voted 21–3 in favour of the Communist International's "Imperialist War" thesis. Pollitt was removed from his position as general secretary and Campbell as Daily Worker editor at that time, although the cashiering of the third member of the minority, Willie Gallacher, the CPGB's only Member of Parliament, was considered unthinkable. Neither Pollitt nor Campbell publicly fought the party over its new Moscow-determined orientation and neither was expelled for their dissent. When the party line on the war changed once again following Hitler's invasion of the USSR in June 1941, both Pollitt and Campbell were restored to the party's good graces.

From 1949 to 1959, Campbell again served as editor of the Daily Worker. In 1956, he supported the Soviet invasion of Hungary, although in 1968 he condemned the Soviet invasion of Czechoslovakia. In the 1951 general election he stood against Winston Churchill in the Woodford constituency, gaining 871 votes (1.34 per cent).

Campbell died on 18 September 1969.

== Published works ==
- Direct Action: An Outline of Workshop and Social Organisation. With William Gallacher. Glasgow: Scottish Workers' Committees, 1919.
- My Case. London: Communist Party of Great Britain, n.d. [1924].
- What Is the Use of Parliament? The Limitations of Parliamentary Democracy as Disclosed in the General Election, 1924. London: Communist Party of Great Britain, n.d. [c. 1925].
- The Communist Party on Trial: J.R. Campbell's Defence: The Speech for the Defence. London: Communist Party of Great Britain, n.d. [1925].
- Communism and Industrial Peace. London: Communist Party of Great Britain, 1928.
- Red Politics in the Trade Unions: Who Are the Disrupters? London: Communist Party of Great Britain, 1928.
- Is Labour Lost? The New Labour Party's Programme Examined. London: Communist Party of Great Britain, 1928.
- Rationalisation and British Industry. London: Trinity Trust, 1928.
- Preparing for Revolt. With N. Lenin. London: Modern Books, 1929.
- Only Communism Can Conquer Unemployment: A Reply to Lloyd George and Others. London: Communist Party of Great Britain, n.d. [1929].
- Arguments of the Opponents of the United Front in England. London: Modern Books, 1936.
- Peace — But How? A Workshop Talk. London: Communist Party of Great Britain, n.d. [c. 1936].
- Spain Organises for Victory: The Policy of the Communist Party of Spain. With Jesús Hernández and Joan Comorera. London: Communist Party of Great Britain, n.d. [1937].
- Spain's "Left" Critics. London: Communist Party of Great Britain, 1937.
- Questions and Answers on Communism. London: Lawrence and Wishart, 1938.
- Soviet Policy and Its Critics. London: Victor Gollancz, 1939.
- Doing Well Out of the War? London: Communist Party of Great Britain, 1941.
- Russia's Way to Victory. London: Modern Books, n.d. [1941].
- Socialism through Victory: A Reply to the Policy of the ILP. Glasgow: Scottish District Committee, Communist Party of Great Britain, n.d. [1942].
- Disquiet on the Home Front. London: Trinity Trust, 1943.
- The War Worker and the Second Front. London: Trinity Trust, 1944.
- Trotskyist Saboteurs. London: Daily Worker League, 1944.
- The Plan of British Socialism. London: Trinity Trust, 1944.
- Post War "Daily Worker" Conference, 12 May: J.R. Campbell Reports. London: Daily Worker League, n.d. [1945].
- Over to Peace: Communist Policy for the Conversion of Industry. London: Communist Party of Great Britain, 1945.
- The Communist Answer to the Challenge of our Time: A Reprint of the Lectures. With John Lewis, J.D. Bernal, Randall Swingler, B. Farrington, and H. Levy. London: Thames, 1947.
- A Socialist Solution to the Crisis. London: Communist Party of Great Britain, n.d. [1948].
- William Rust, A Fighter for the People. With William Rust. London: Peoples' Press Printing Society, 1949.
- The Story of the Daily Worker. With William Rust and Allen Hunt. London: Peoples' Press Printing Society, 1949.
- Welfare State or Warfare State? An Appeal to Every Sincere Labour Man and Woman. With Harry Pollitt and R. Palme Dutt. London : People's Press Printing Society, n.d. [1950].
- Creative Marxism versus Vulgar "Marxism." New York: American Marxist Association, 1955.
- Some Economic Illusions in the Labour Movement. London: Lawrence and Wishart, 1959.
- Robert Burns "the Democrat" (1759–1959). Glasgow: Communist Party, Scottish Committee, n.d. [1959].
- 40 Fighting Years: The Communist Record, 1920 – 1960: Some Highlights in the Life of the Communist Party of Great Britain. London: Communist Party of Great Britain, 1960.
- The Case for Higher Wages: The Incomes Policy Racket Exposed. London: Communist Party of Great Britain, 1963.
- Hands Off the Trade Unions. London: Communist Party of Great Britain, 1965.

Party political offices
Preceded by Albert Inkpin	General Secretary of the Communist Party of Great Britain; February – May 1929	Succeeded by Harry Pollitt
Media offices
Preceded by Rajani Palme Dutt	Editor of the Workers' Weekly; 1924–1926	Succeeded by Tom Wintringham
Preceded by Dave Springhall	Editor of the Daily Worker; 1939	Succeeded by William Rust
Preceded by William Rust	Editor of the Daily Worker; 1949–1959	Succeeded by George Matthews
