= Robert Page Arnot =

British Communist journalist and politician (1890–1986)

- Born: 15 December 1890; Greenock
- Died: 18 May 1986 (aged 95)
- Other names: Robin
- Citizenship: United Kingdom
- Education: Glasgow University
- Known for: Founding member of the Communist Party of Great Britain (CPGB). Conscientious objector
- Notable work: Labour Monthly (co-founder, contributor and editor)
- Criminal charges: Refusing conscription – Conscientious objector (1917). Mutiny – charged under the Incitement to Mutiny Act 1797 (1925).
- Criminal penalty: Refusing conscription – forced labour (1917-1919). Attempted mutiny – 6 months prison (1925-1926)
- Spouse(s): Leila Ward (m. 1916, divorced) Olive Budden (m. 1935)
- Children: 1

Robert "Robin" Page Arnot (15 December 1890 – 18 May 1986), best known as R. Page Arnot, was a British Communist journalist, author, and Party functionary.

== Early years ==
Robert Page Arnot, known to his friends as "Robin", was born in 1890 at Greenock, the son of a newspaper editor. He attended Glasgow University where he helped form the University Socialist Federation in 1912, along with G. D. H. Cole and others. He also wrote for the Independent Labour Party's publication, Labour Leader, using the pseudonym "Jack Cade."

In 1912 the Fabian socialists Sidney and Beatrice Webb established the Fabian Research Department, which evolved into the Labour Research Department. One of the volunteers attracted by this new trade union-based research organisation was Arnot; he became its secretary in 1914, a position he held until 1927.

In 1916 Arnot refused conscription into the British army during World War I. He was imprisoned for two years as a conscientious objector, and served the time in the Wakefield Work Centre. When he was freed at the war's conclusion in 1918, he returned to his post in the Labour Research Department. In 1919, in response to labour unrest in the nation's coal mines, the British government established a Committee of Inquiry. The evidence marshalled by the Labour Research Department—in support of the Miners' Federation demands for higher wages, shorter hours, and government ownership of the mines—was largely the work of Arnot.

== Political career ==
In 1920 Arnot was a founding member of the Communist Party of Great Britain (CPGB). Coming from a background as a guild socialist, he favoured close integration of the CPGB with the broader labour movement, including affiliation as a member organisation under the Labour Party's umbrella.

In 1921 he co-founded, along with R. Palme Dutt and W. N. Ewer, the Labour Monthly journal, and remained a regular contributor and associate editor until the journal's last issue in March 1981.

In 1925 Arnot was among the 12 Communists charged under the Incitement to Mutiny Act 1797. He was found guilty and jailed for six months. He was released on the eve of the 1926 General Strike and helped form the Northumberland and Durham Joint Strike Committee. After the strike ended, Arnot returned to the Labour Research Department as its Director of Research, and wrote a book about the event titled The General Strike and the Miners' Struggle.

Arnot was elected to the governing Central Committee of the CPGB at the party's 9th Congress in 1927. He was returned to the Central Committee at the 10th and 11th Congresses in 1929, the 12th Congress in 1932, the 13th Congress in 1935, and the 14th Congress in 1937. However, he was not among the 24 members elected by the 15th Congress in 1938.

Arnot was an elected delegate to the 6th World Congress of the Communist International ("Comintern"), held in Moscow in 1928. He acted as a British representative to the Comintern over the next decade. In Labour Monthly articles, he defended the Moscow Trials and chastised both the Manchester Guardian and the politician Emrys Hughes for their criticism of the trials. Arnot accepted the Soviet government's argument that it was eradicating a "fifth column" of fascist agents who had infiltrated important positions.

=== Postwar ===
Arnot was a prolific pamphleteer and author. From 1949 to 1975, he wrote a six-volume history of the British mineworkers. In his later years, though he no longer held a post in the Communist Party, he continued to pour his energy into Labour Monthly. He also publicly fought the revisionist trend that he believed was taking control of the CPGB.

Arnot was known for possessing a large private collection of labour movement documents. Most were from the 20th century, for instance, he had a bound volume of transcripts of all the BBC radio bulletins issued during the 1926 General Strike. Among his older artifacts was a volume of printed annual reports, from 1873–1887, of the Amalgamated Association of Miners of West Bromwich.

In early 1986, Arnot was arrested and accused of being a Soviet spy. He was released in what seemed to many as a cover-up and bribe. He had allegedly been seen meeting with a Soviet intelligence officer multiple times. He denied the accusations. The British counter-intelligence agency MI5 conducted an investigation, the results of which are classified and not to be disclosed until 2056.

== Death ==
Arnot died on 18 May 1986, at the age of 95. He left behind his lifelong comrade and wife, Olive.

== Publications by R. Page Arnot ==
- Trade Unionism on the Railways: Its History and Problems. Written with G. D. H. Cole. London: George Allen and Unwin, 1917.
- Nationalisation of the Mines. n.c. [London]: Daily Herald, n.d. [c. 1919].
- Facts from the Coal Commission. Westminster: Labour Research Department, 1919.
- Further Facts from the Coal Commission: Being a History of the Second Stage of the Coal Industry Commission, with Excerpts from the Evidence Compiled by R. Page Arnot. London: Allen and Unwin, 1919.
- The Russian Revolution: A Narrative and a Guide for Reading. London: Labour Research Department, 1923.
- Fight the Slave Plan: The Dawes Plan Exposed. London: Communist Party of Great Britain, n.d. [c. 1924].
- The Politics of Oil: An Example of Imperialist Monopoly. London: Labour Research Department, 1924.
- The General Strike, May 1926: Its Origin and History. London: Labour Research Department, 1926.
- The General Strike and the Miners' Struggle. London: Labour Research Department, 1926.
- History of the Labour Research Department. London: Labour Research Department, 1926.
- Exit: The Trade Disputes Act. London: Labour Research Department, n.d. [c. 1927].
- Soviet Russia and Her Neighbors. Written with Jerome Davis. New York: Vanguard Press, 1927.
- How Britain Rules India. London: Communist Party of Great Britain, 1929.
- Slavery or Socialism?. London: Communist Party of Great Britain, n.d. [c. 1934].
- William Morris: A Vindication. London: Martin Lawrence, 1934.
- A Short History of the Russian Revolution from 1905 to the Present Day. In Two Volumes. London: Victor Gollancz, 1937.
- Fascist Agents Exposed in the Moscow Trials. Written with Tim Buck. London: Communist Party of Great Britain, 1938.
- Twenty Years: The Policy of the Communist Party of Great Britain from its Foundation, July 31st, 1920. London: Lawrence and Wishart, 1940.
- Soviet Leaders: Stalin. Sydney: Current Book Distributors, n.d. [c. 1942].
- 1917-1942: From Tsardom to Soviet Power. London: Russia Today Society, 1942.
- Japan. London: Labour Monthly, n.d. [c. 1942].
- Japan: Strength and Weaknesses. London: Trinity Trust, 1942.
- What is Common Wealth?. London: Communist Party of Great Britain, 1943.
- There are No Aryans: A Popular Study of the Bogus Race Doctrines of the Nazis (and Others) in the Light of Reason and Scientific Facts, with Special Reference to Anti-Semitism. London: Labour Monthly, n.d. [1943]. Australian edition: Sydney: Current Book Distributors, 1944.
- May Day 1945. London: Communist Party of Great Britain, 1945.
- The Miners: A History of the Miners' Federation of Great Britain, 1889–1910. London: Allen and Unwin, 1949.
- Bernard Shaw and William Morris: A Lecture, Given on May 11, 1956. London: William Morris Society, 1957.
- William Morris: The Man and the Myth. London: Lawrence and Wishart, 1964.
- The Impact of the Russian Revolution in Britain. London: Lawrence and Wishart, 1967.
- South Wales Miners, Glowyr de Cymru: A History of the South Wales Miners' Federation (1914–1926). Cardiff : Cymric Federation Press, 1975.
- The Miners: One Union, One Industry: A History of the National Union of Mineworkers, 1939–46. London: Allen and Unwin, 1979.
