= People's Publishing House (India) =

Indian publisher

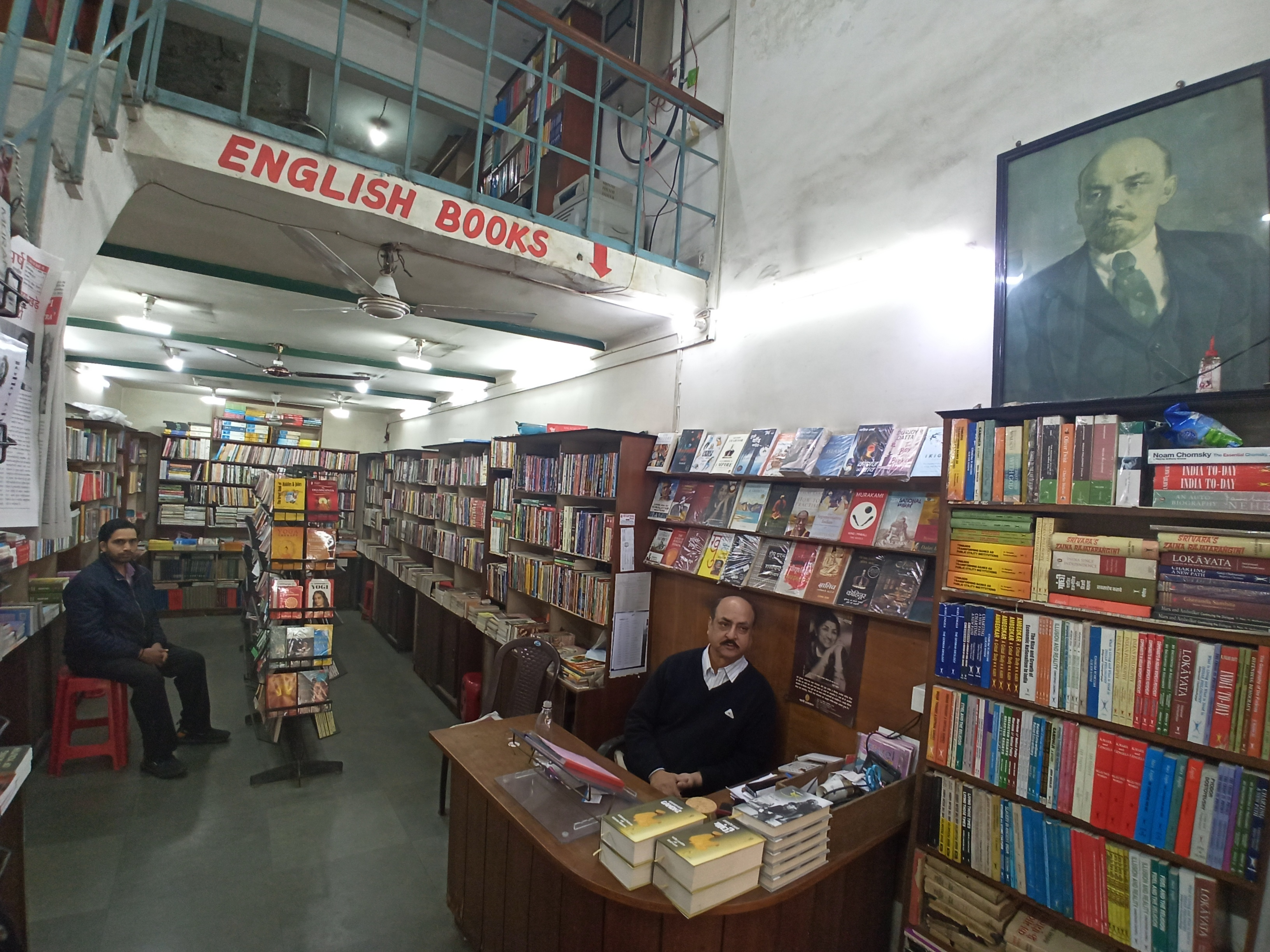
- Status: Active
- Founded: 1942; 84 years ago
- Founder: Communist Party of India
- Country of origin: India
- Headquarters location: 5E, Rani Jhansi Road, New Delhi – 110055, India.
- Key people: Sudhakar Reddy; Bhalchandra Kango; Narayana Kankanala; Atul Kumar Anjan
- Publication types: Books
- Nonfiction topics: History, Politics, Marxism, Literature, Children's Literature, philosophy
- Official website: www.pphbooks.net

People's Publishing House (PPH) is an Indian publisher. It is headquartered in New Delhi. PPH publishes books on topics including politics, history, art and culture, novels, children's literature, autobiographies, but primarily caters to Marxist and progressive literature. PPH was officially established in 1942, when the British Indian government legalised the Communist Party of India. PPH was incorporated as a trust in 1947. The current publishers of PPH are Sudhakar Survaram Reddy, Bhalchandra Khanderao Kango, Narayana Kankanala and Atul Kumar Anjan

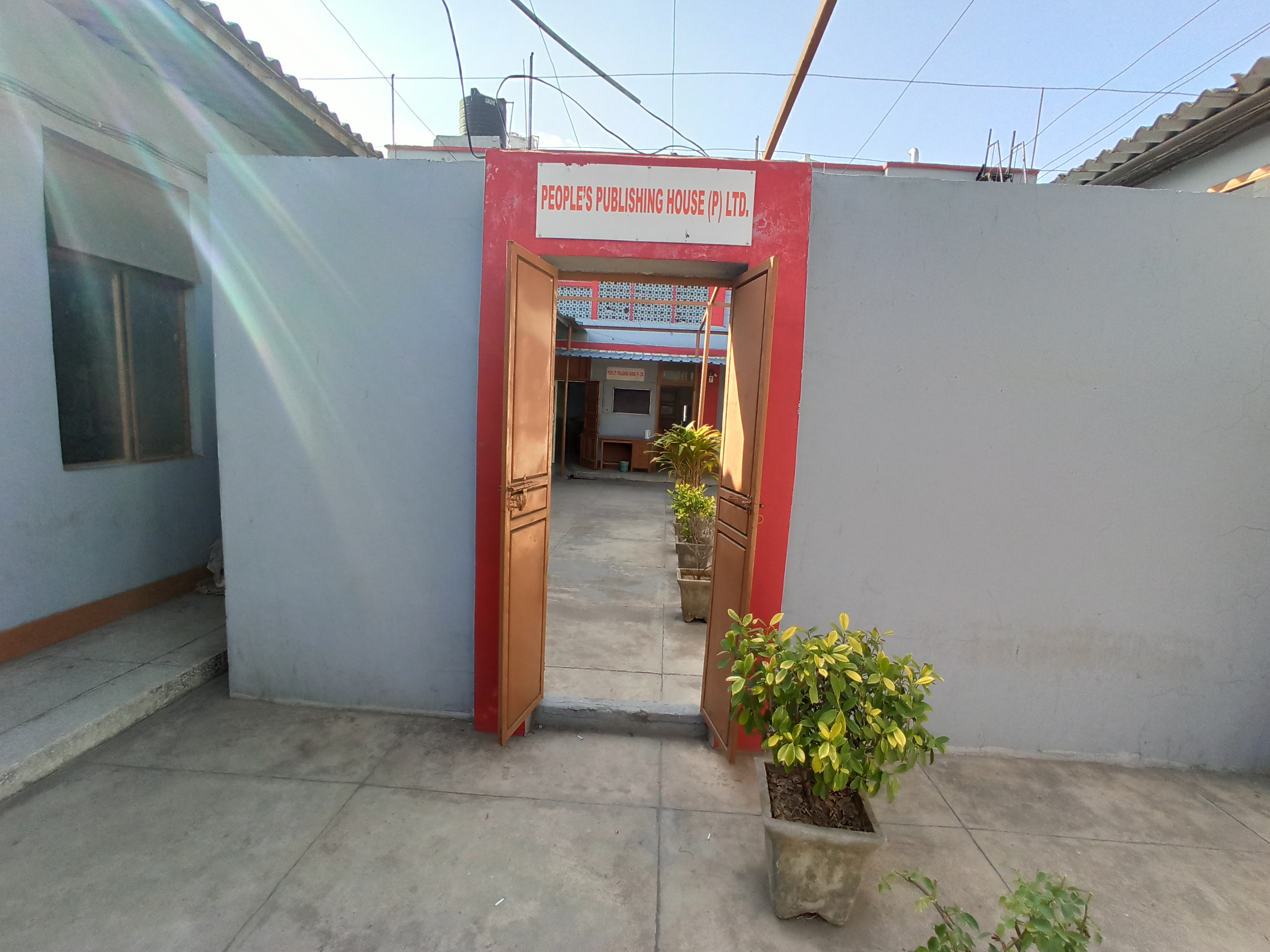
PPH Headquarters, Rani Jhansi Road, New Delhi

Presently, apart from its headquarters at Rani Jhansi Road and in New Delhi, PPH has three other branches in Delhi. They are in Jawaharlal Nehru University, Connaught Place Showroom, and at CPI Headquarters at Ajoy Bhawan. Outside Delhi, PPH has branch offices in Lucknow and Ranchi as well. There is also a People's Book House, operating in Patna. In Maharashtra, PPH was renamed as Lok Vangmay Griha (House of People's Literature in Marathi), which is located at Bhupesh Gupta Bhavan, Leningrad Chowk, Mumbai. Apart from its own Printing Press at Prabhadevi, Mumbai, it also operates a book shop, People's Book House, at Horniman Circle of Mumbai city. In Rajasthan, there exists a Rajasthan People's Publishing House (RPPH), which is a separate entity closely linked with Communist Party of India. Narendra Acharya who is on the board of directors of RPPH is State Secretary of the Communist Party of India's Rajasthan State Council. RPPH was established in 1978, and is located at Chameliwala Market in state capital Jaipur.

The PPH occasionally publish works by foreign Marxist authors, with special copyright arrangements with the original publishing houses. In the 1980's, PPH and RPPH had jointly published Soviet books in Hindi, with Raduga Publishers Moscow. These books were printed in the Soviet Union, but carried the names and logo of these three publishing houses. PPH was a major importer and distributor of Soviet books in India between 1943 and 1995.

== History ==
Although the Communist Party of India (CPI) was established as a political party in October 1920, it was constantly suppressed by the British Indian government and had to work as an underground movement. In June 1941, Adolf Hitler attacked the USSR and CPI changed its strategy in viewing World War II not as an "imperialistic war" but as a "people's war against fascism". It also decided to support the Allied powers so as to defeat Nazi Germany. In July 1942, the British rulers of India legalised the Communist Party of India in return for its support to the British war effort. With this, CPI was also permitted to import books from the USSR and to publish its own party literature. Thus, People's Publishing House (PPH) started as a publishing and book distributing arm of the Communist Party of India in 1942. It was officially incorporated as a private limited company on 12 March 1947.

Although the PPH was officially established in 1942, after the CPI was legalised, the underground CPI had already published booklets under the name People's Publishing House since 1921. In 1921 it published a 43-page booklet titled Thesis on the organization and Structure of the communist Parties. This booklet was also published in the same year in Hindi as well. In 1935, PPH published Frank Verulam's 46-page booklet titled Imperialism and the People. In 1939, PPH published Dona Torr's 31 pages booklet From Imperialist War to People's War.

In 1942, CPI rented a three-storey house, Raj Bhuvan, on the Sandhurst Road (now Sardar Vallabhbhai Patel Marg) in Bombay. CPI's Party Headquarters (popularly known as PHQ) was established in this building. Several senior leaders of CPI and other workers used to live and work in the PHQ along with their families. People's Publishing House (PPH) and the Hand Composing section of New Age Printing Press was also housed in the Raj Bhuvan building. The Hand Composing department of New Age Printing Press was located on the ground floor of Raj Bhuvan. Nearby, on Khetwadi Road, another half portion of a building, known as RK Building, and the top storey of another house was also rented by CPI. An English Linotype machine was established on the Khetwadi Road building, and New Age Printing Press was also housed there. PPH's retail office was established on the third floor of this building. On the First Floor of the RK Building, Photographer Sunil Janah used to have a Darkroom.

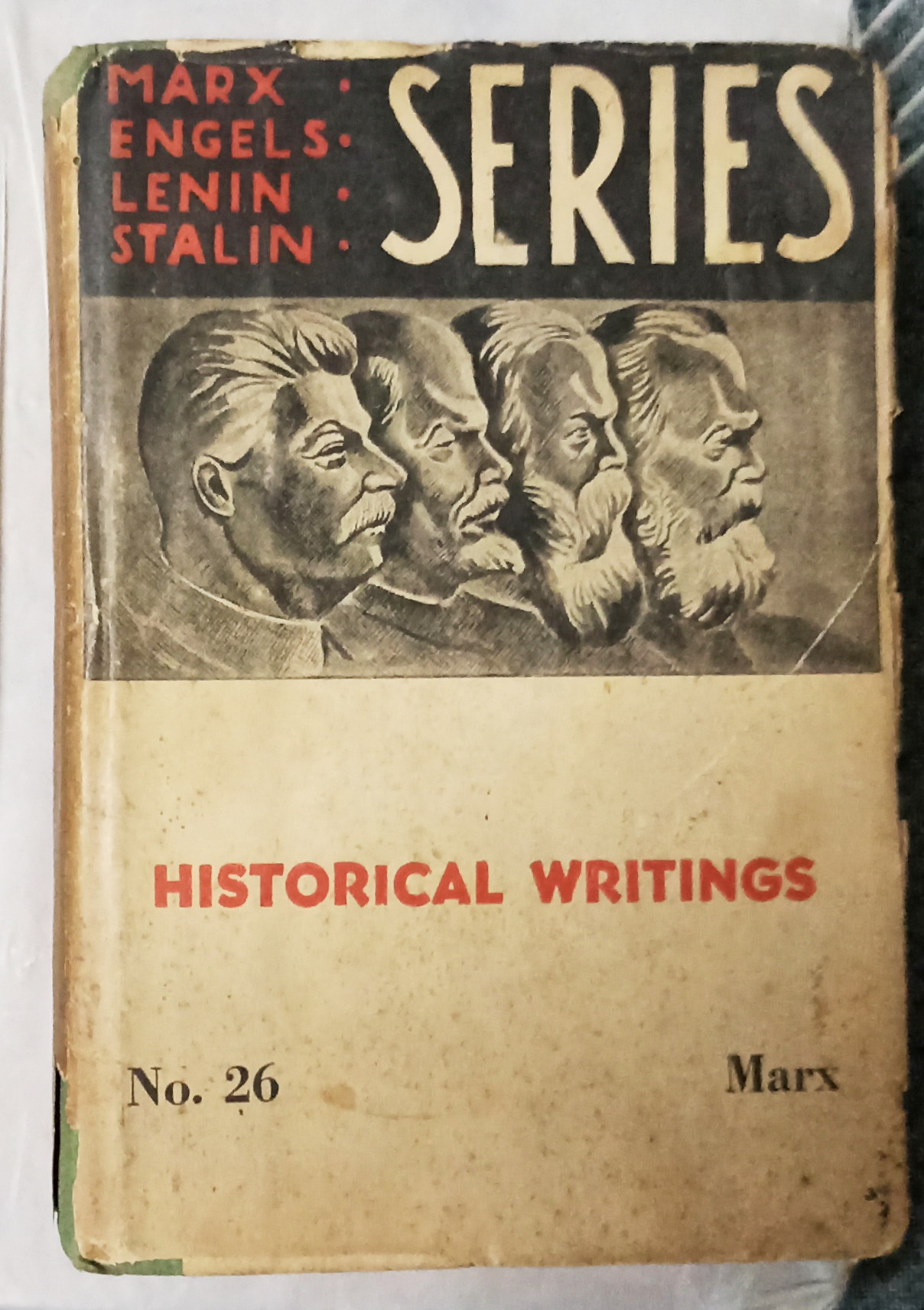
Historical Writings Series, PPH Bombay, 1944 Edition

PC Joshi, then General Secretary of CPI, had started publication of its English mouthpiece People's War and its Hindi edition Lok Yuddh (लोक युद्ध) on 2 October 1942, that was published from CPI Headquarters at Raj Bhuvan and printed from New Age Printing Press on Khetwadi Road. After the end of the Second World War, B.T. Ranadive had decided to change the name of People's War to People's Age. In its formative years, PPH only published Marxist classics; literature belonging to the Second World War; and one or two story books by Soviet writers. The first book came out of the press in November 1942 and it was Gangadhar Adhikari's From Peace Front to People's War. The first edition that was published in November 1942 was in booklet form. The second edition, published in June 1944, was an enlarged one. Adhikari was the former General Secretary of CPI, who served this position between 1933 and 1935. In 1942, PPH also published a 46-page booklet by Sharaf Athar Ali titled Against Hitler – The Voice of Free Germany. PPH also published, in 1943, Mikhail Sholokhov's story Hate; Elena Kononenko's story Tanya; and Nikolai Tikhonov's Tales of Leningrad as separate booklets. Tanya was also translated into Gujrati and Urdu. Its Urdu translation was done by Ali Sardar Jafri. In 1943, PPH also reprinted The Army of the Soviet Union by Prof. I Minz. This book was originally published a year before, in 1942, in Moscow.

In April 1943, PPH published a pamphlet titled Kisans on the March - For Food and Freedom, edited by the communist leader E. M. S. Namboodiripad who later became the first chief minister of Kerala.

From 1943 onwards, PPH started to distribute Soviet books in India. National Book Agency (NBA), which was based in Calcutta, had started distributing Soviet books in 1945. NBA was established by noted Marxist leader Muzaffar Ahmad along with his colleagues Rebati Burman and Suren Kar in 1939. NBA is still functioning today from its historic premises 12 A, Bankim Chatterjee Street, Calcutta. Both PPH and NBA were the only distributor of Soviet books in British India.

In 1944, PPH published Otto Kunsinen's Finland Unmasked, which was a 35-page booklet and available for 6 Annas; Friedrich Engels's Ludwig Feurbach; and Molotov's New Powers of the Soviet Republics. In the same year it also published PC Joshi's booklet Among Kisan Patriots.

In 1944 PPH started publication of a two volume series of Historical Writings of Karl Marx and Friedrich Engels. It was the first Indian edition of Marx and Engels's works. Volume 1 of this series was published in 1944 and volume 2 was published in 1945. In 1944, PPH also published a 459-page book titled The History of the October Revolution that was edited by Maxim Gorky, Vyacheslav Molotov, Kliment Voroshilov, Sergei Kirov, Andrei Zhdanov and Joseph Stalin. Maxim Gorky's reminiscences Days with Lenin was published by PPH in January 1944.

Just a few months before Indian independence, PPH was organised as a trust on 12 March 1947, and it became a private limited company. In the same year PPH established a branch in Lahore city, which became a big publishing house in Pakistan after independence. Another branch was established in Lucknow. Another entity was established under the name People's Book House in Rangoon city of Burma.

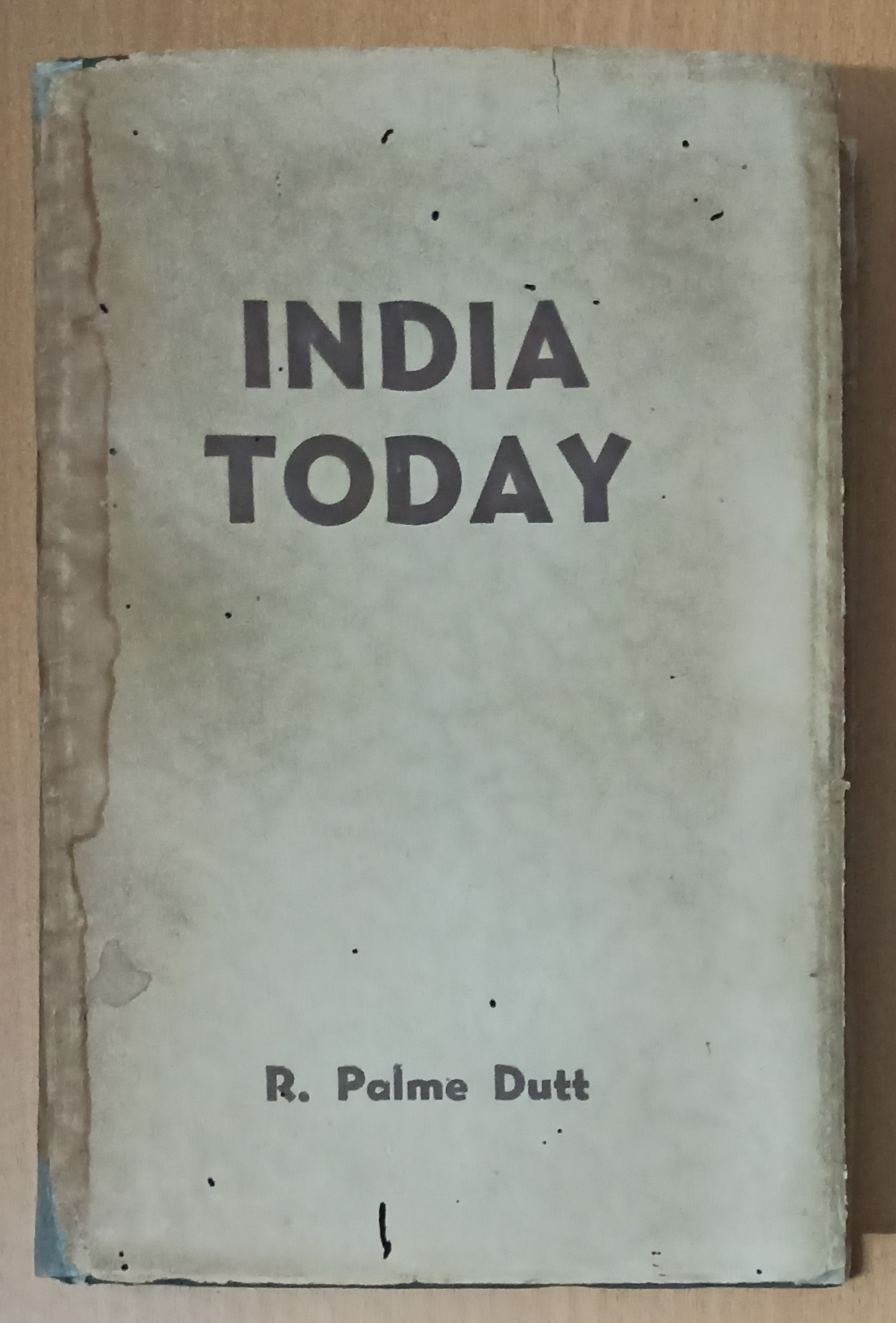
India Today, 1947 Edition

In several other cities of India, namely Nagpur, Poona, Patna, Trichur, Allahabad and Calicut, several People's Book Houses (PBH) were established in 1947 selling Soviet books and magazines. In Vijaywada, a Prajashakti Publishing House was established in 1947. Prajasakti Book House is a sizable publisher and bookseller of the Andhra Pradesh and the Telangana region. In 1947 PPH published the first Indian edition of the book India Today by R. Palme Dutt.

During the late 1940s, all the People's Book Houses, National Book Agency (NBA) and Prajasakti Publishing House had directly served as the branches of PPH. Presently, NBA and Prajasakti are no longer associated with PPH, and are currently associated with Communist Party of India (Marxist), which split from the CPI in 1964.

CPI started a Telangana Rebellion preceding independence. This movement gained momentum which led to, in 1948, most of the CPI's important leaders going underground to avoid arrest. PPH was not flourishing during this time, but in order to distribute books and other literature in Delhi, two volunteers, Atul Sawani and Madan Bakaya, arrived from Bombay and established a book shop called Delhi Book Centre on Irwin Road (now Baba Kharak Singh Marg) in Connaught Place. This area was a calm market of Delhi in those days and intellectuals of Delhi often walked through this market to search for books. So for CPI, having a book shop in this area was of important value. But because of Telangana Rebellion, this was done very discretely and in different names to avoid attention of police. In 1950 a Marx House was established by CPI in Connaught Place, which was a meeting place for intellectuals and Soviet books and periodicals were available here for sale. It functioned for a year or two. CPI also opened a third book shop, Minerva Book Stall, in Connaught Place at this time. During this time of the Telangana Rebellion, the offices and Bombay Headquarters of PPH were also raided by the police in search of proscribed literature.

In 1951, CPI ended the Telangana Rebellion and the Nehru Government had lifted its sanctions on the party. Just before the General Elections of 1951, CPI headquarters had moved from Bombay to Delhi. It was first established on Keeling Road (now Tolstoy Marg) in Connaught Place. In 1952, it was shifted to a building called Pahwa Mansion on Asaf Ali Road. A nearby building, called Khanna Building, was also rented. Several volunteers from both the newspaper Janyug (meaning People's Age in Hindi) and PPH were moved from Dev Nagar (Rohtak Road, Delhi) into this Khanna Building and it became the PPH headquarter in Delhi for next couple of years. The New Age Printing Press was accommodated in Paharganj area.

In 1951, a few leaders of CPI had opened a book shop called Progs Books in Connaught Place. It became a meeting point of CPI members from all over the country.

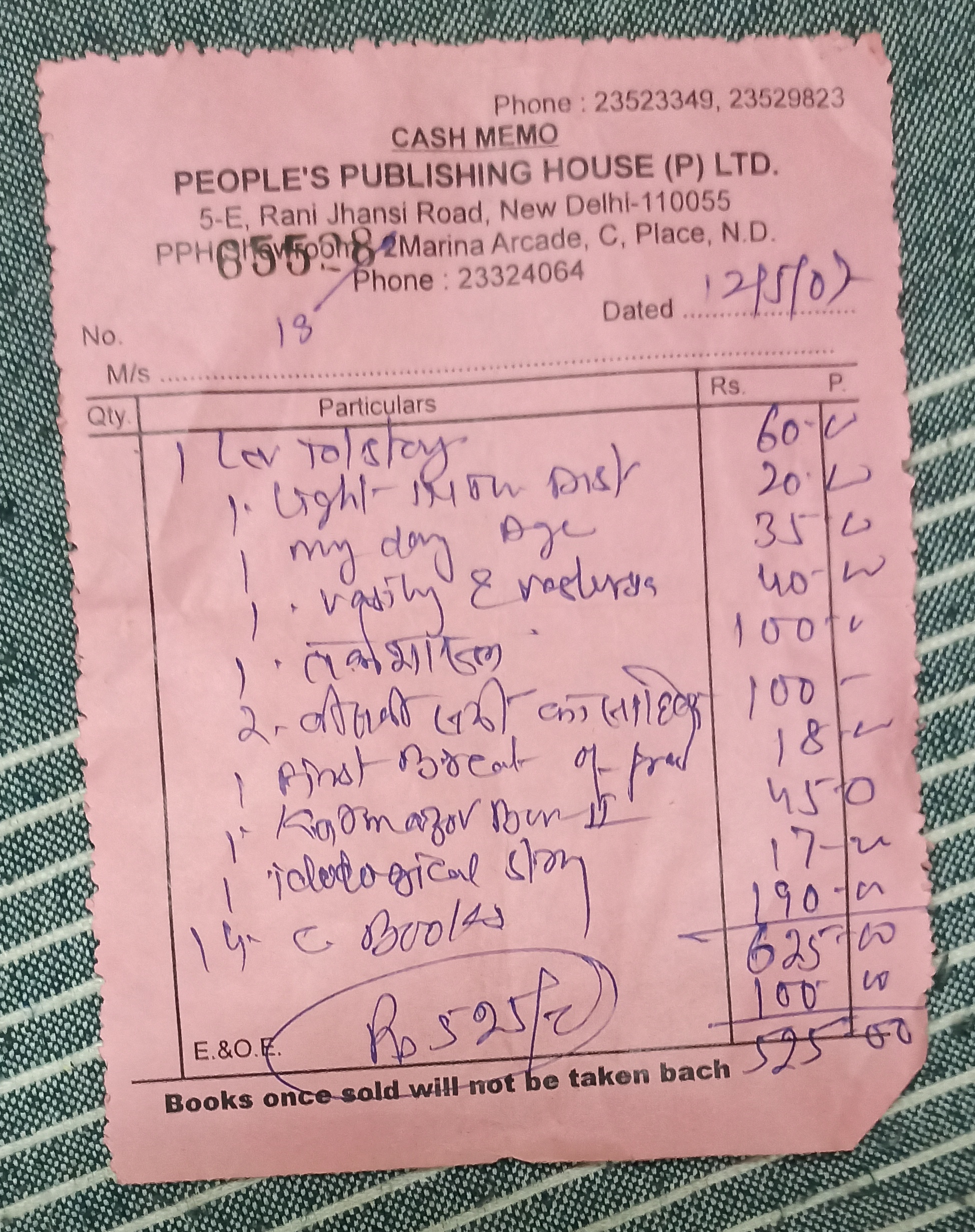
PPH bill of 2007, marking an address change of Connaught Place Showroom

By 1953, Delhi Book Centre was moved to Paharganj in the same building as New Age Printing Press. In the same year, Connaught Place Showroom of PPH was established by renting half of a shop from the chemist Nath Brothers. In its heyday, many stalwarts of Indian culture, cinema and literature including Ali Sardar Jafri, Kaifi Azmi, Shabana Azmi and Annu Kapoor and others used to visit this showroom and purchase books.

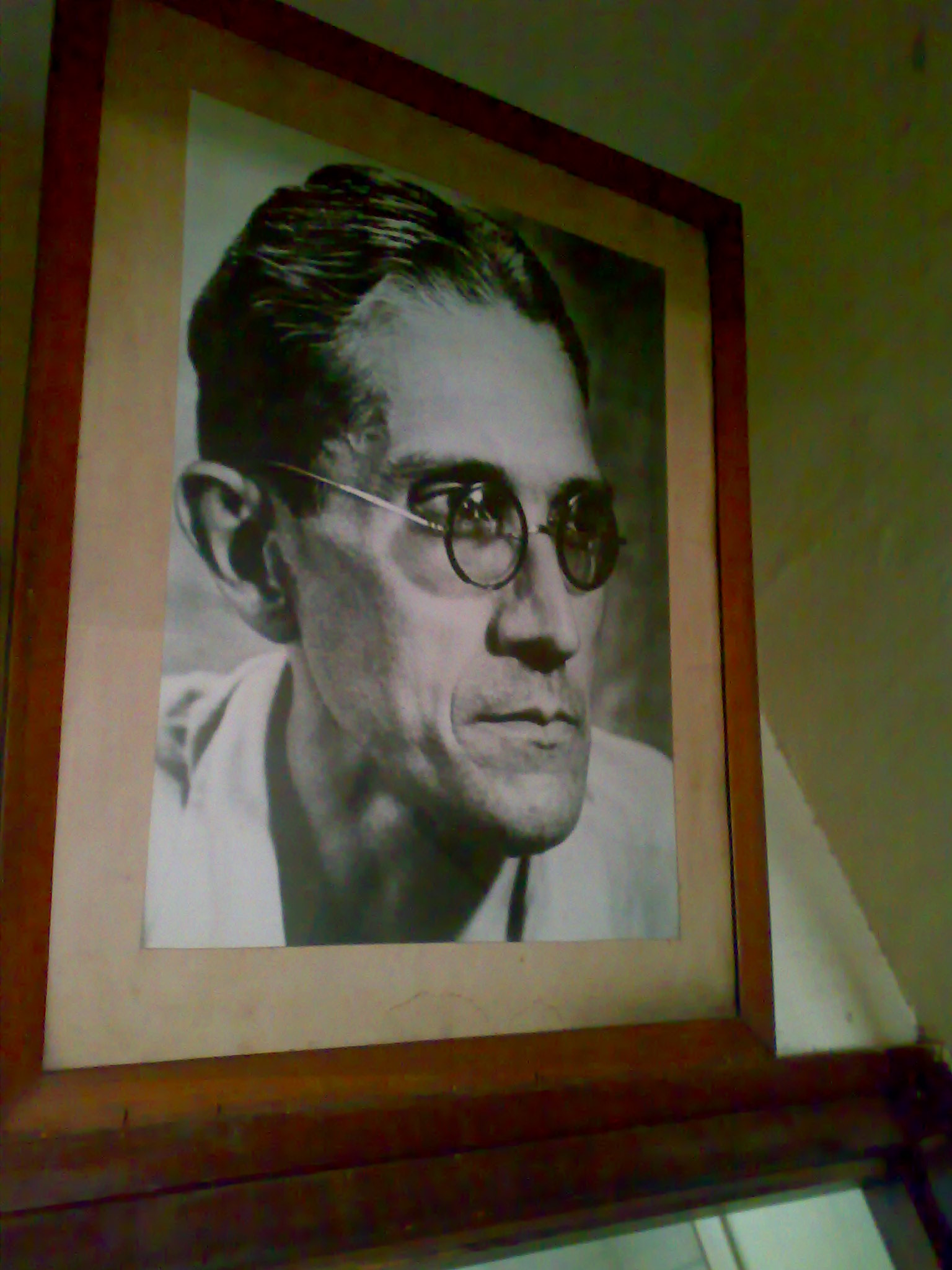
RPD's Portrait at PPH Headquarters, Rani Jhansi Road

Between 1956 and 1958, CPI established a three-storey building for PPH on 5E, M.M. Road of Delhi (now Rani Jhansi Road, Jhandewalan, Delhi). New Age Printing Press was established on the ground floor of this building, from where the newspaper Janyug and the English newspaper New Age were printed. People's Publishing House was established on the second floor of this building. This building was named R. Palme Dutt Bhawan, after the noted British Communist leader who visited India in 1946. On the second floor stairs of this building hung a photo of R. Palme Dutt that was taken by CPI in 1946 during his India visit. This photograph was there until very recently and might have been moved to CPI headquarters at Ajoy Bhawan in Delhi.

By 1948, PPH was publishing and selling books by the Hindi author Rahul Sankrityayan all over India, despite the fact that he had resigned from the Communist Party. Hindi author Ram Vilas Sharma had started his literary career at PPH. In 1950s, noted Hindi writer Nirmal Verma and veteran leader of Communist Party of India (Marxist) Ram Aasre were associated with PPH and had translated Soviet Books for the publishing house. Verma translated Alexander Fadeyev's Parajay, The Rout (पराजय) and the stories of Alexander Kuprin into Hindi. Aasre translated Maxim Gorky's Literary Portraits (साहित्यिक संस्मरण) into Hindi.

Narottam Nagar translated 21 Russian Stories (21 रूसी कहानियाँ) and Mikhail Saltykov-Shchedrin's Stories (नेकी और बदी) into Hindi.

In the months leading to the collapse of Soviet Union, there was a period of political instability in USSR. During this time, PPH stopped receiving Marxist literature because of policy changes in the USSR. When Indian readers feared that Russian books were going to disappear forever, they rushed to PPH bookstores to buy entire volumes of Marx and Lenin. After the dissolution of the Soviet Union in 1991, Russians kept on supplying books to PPH till 1995. PPH continued selling these books until early 2000s from huge stockpiles that it purchased during the Soviet era. For importing Soviet Books into India, PPH directly dealt with Soviet Exports Agency for Books and Periodicals – Mezhdunarodnaya Kniga (MK).

== Soviet literature and India ==
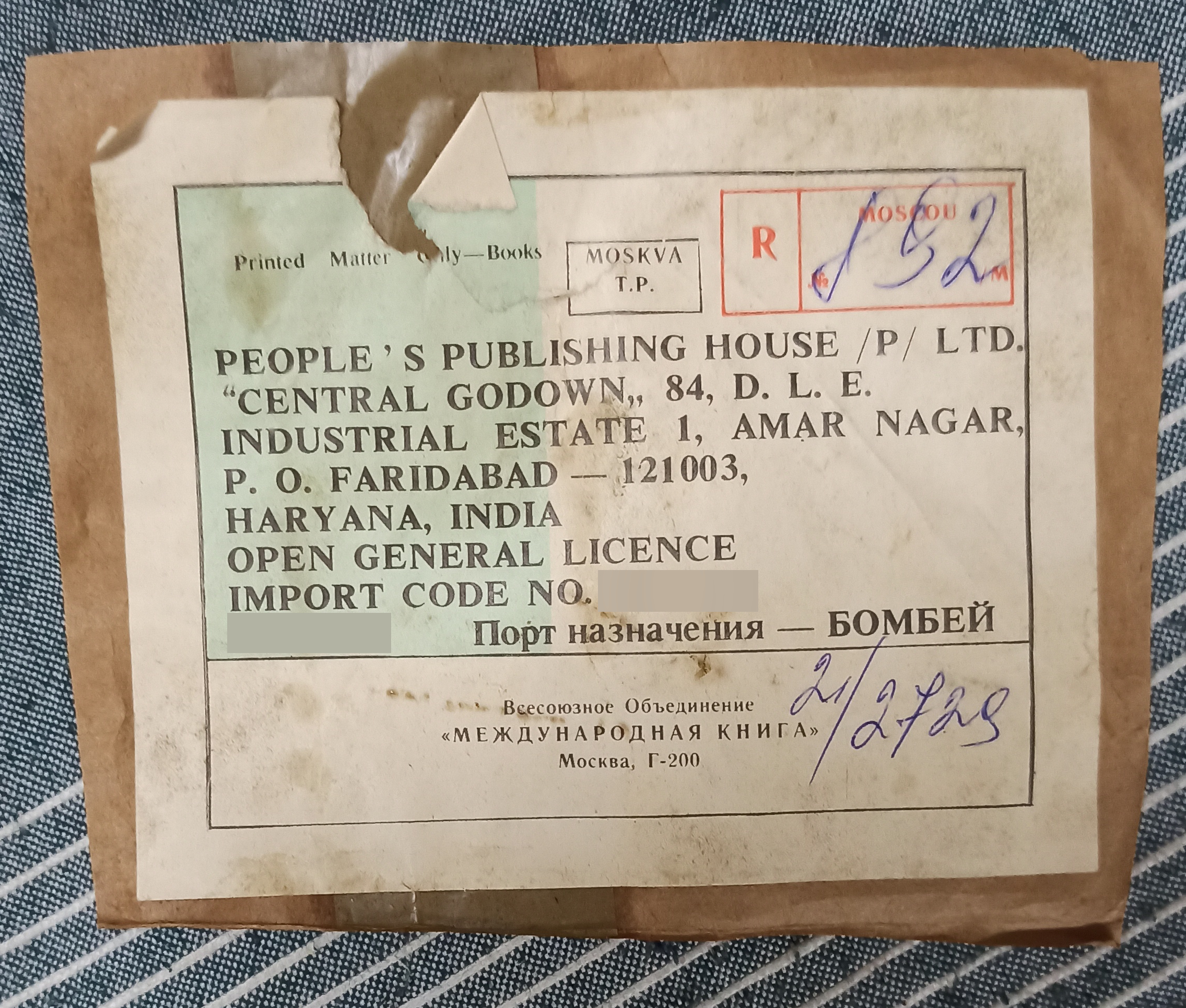
PPH Address Label, found on a parcel sent by Mezhdunarodnaya Kniga.

On the eve of India's independence in 1946, Jawaharlal Nehru had sent K.P.S. Menon, then Indian ambassador to China, to Paris. His task was to meet Soviet Foreign Minister Vyacheslav Molotov on the outskirts of the Paris Peace Conference. Menon gave Molotov a letter from Nehru, in which he wished to establish diplomatic relations with the USSR. In April 1947, a few months before Indian independence, Soviet Union and India formally established diplomatic ties.

Many years prior to these formal diplomatic ties, literature had served as the first contact between the two countries. After the Communist Party of India was legalised by the British in 1942, it started to disseminate Soviet literature through its publishing house PPH. In the same year, the magazine Soviet Union News started publication in Delhi. Apart from news from USSR (published under a column titled "TASS"), it contained stories by Russian authors and other cultural stories. Its price was 3 Annas and it mentioned a post box in Delhi as its registered address. Later, in the year 1947, after the establishment of the Soviet Embassy in India, Representatives of TASS in India revived the publication of a 1930s era Soviet magazine called Soviet Land. This magazine resembled Soviet Union News. The only difference was that it was entirely published and printed by TASS instead of USSR. It was published in 13 other Indian languages including Hindi and Bengali.

Beginning in the 1980s, PPH had distributed Soviet literature in many small towns of India by participating and organising stalls in local level fairs of these small towns. This had led to widespread reach of Soviet books and periodicals amongst the Indian masses. PPH also used to sell Soviet books by dispatching a specially designed van to these towns. This van acted as a bookshop on wheels.

== Impact ==
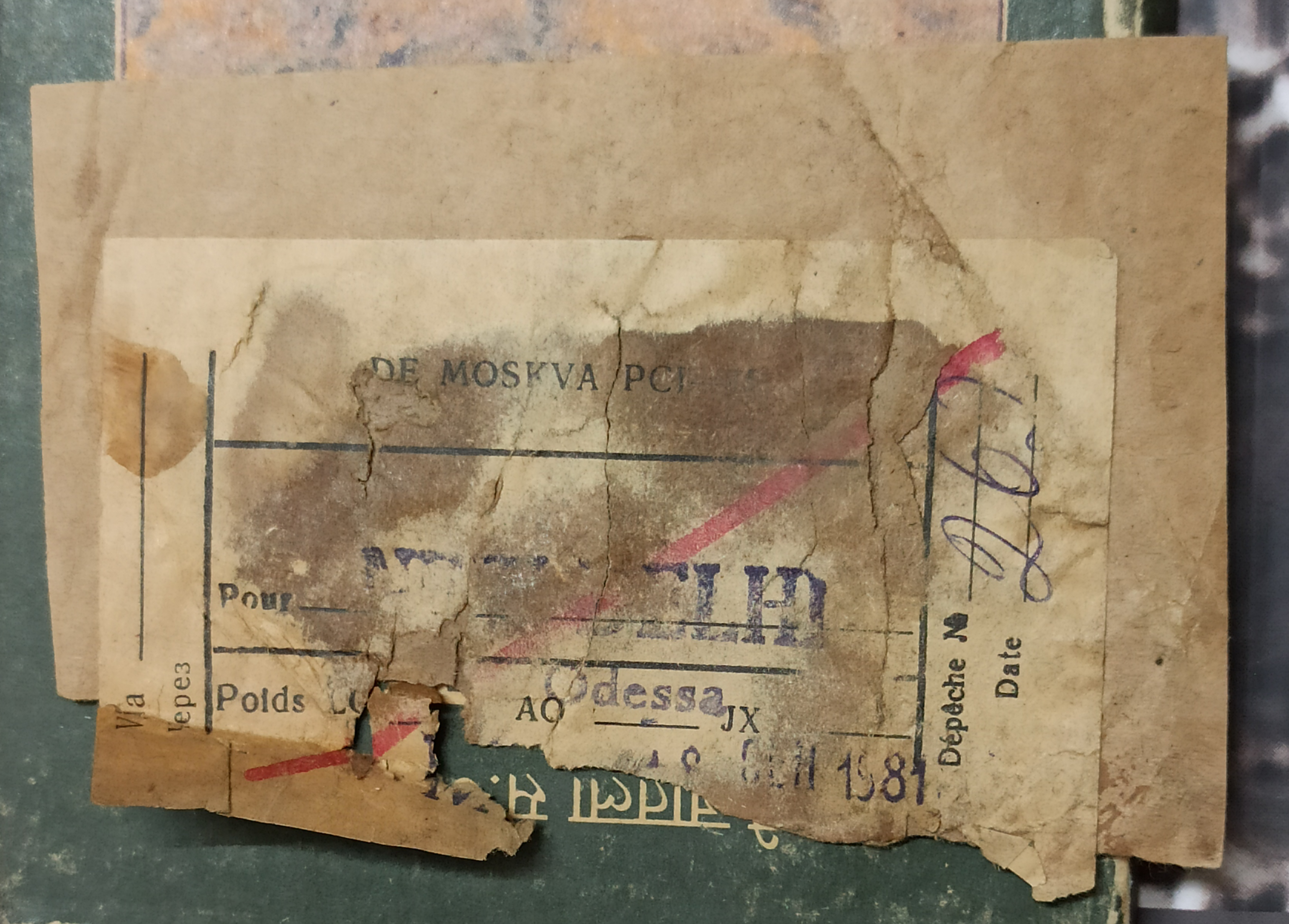
A Russian Postmark of Odessa Port, dating 18 September 1981, found on PPH Parcel

A large number of Soviet Books started appearing on the shelves of Indian readers. Many people who grew up in India in the 1970s,1980s up to the 1990s are still nostalgic about these books with their colourful pages full of art and cartoons.

Not only in the field of literature and children's literature, but also heavily subsidised Soviet textbooks in science and technology, had founded their base among the students of the Indian universities, who considered them much cheaper compared to their American or British counterparts. Through the PPH, Soviet Union had supplied these technical text books to Indian students.

== See also ==
- Interview of PPH Publisher Dr. BN Kango in Hindi
- Interview of PPH Connaught Place Bookshop Manager Mr. Rishav Kumar in Hindi (with English Subtitles)
- A documentary on "Soviet Literature and India", which features interview of PPH Managing Director Mr. Shamim Faizi (in English)
