= Marjorie Pollitt =

British teacher and communist activist

Marjorie Edna Pollitt, born Marjorie Brewer (1902–1991) was a British teacher and communist activist.

Marjorie Brewer was a founder member of the Communist Party of Great Britain (CPGB) in 1920. In 1925 she married Harry Pollitt. During the 1926 General Strike she was arrested and charged with sedition for distributing The Workers Bulletin, a Communist newsletter. Fined £50, she was dismissed from her teaching post, and risked having her teaching certificate suspended.

In the 1950 general election she unsuccessfully contested Hendon North for the Communist Party.

Pollitt, by now a widow, migrated to Australia in 1967 to be with their daughter Jean Suggett, who lived in Adelaide.

In 1989 she published her autobiography, A Rebel Life with the Ultimo-based publisher Red Pen.

== Works ==
- Defeat of Trotskyism. London: Communist Party of Great Britain, 1937.
- A Rebel Life: Marjorie Pollitt recalls her life and times. Ultimo: Red Pen Publications, 1989. With an introduction by Laurie Aarons. ISBN 9780909913687
