= Harry Pollitt =

British communist (1890–1960)

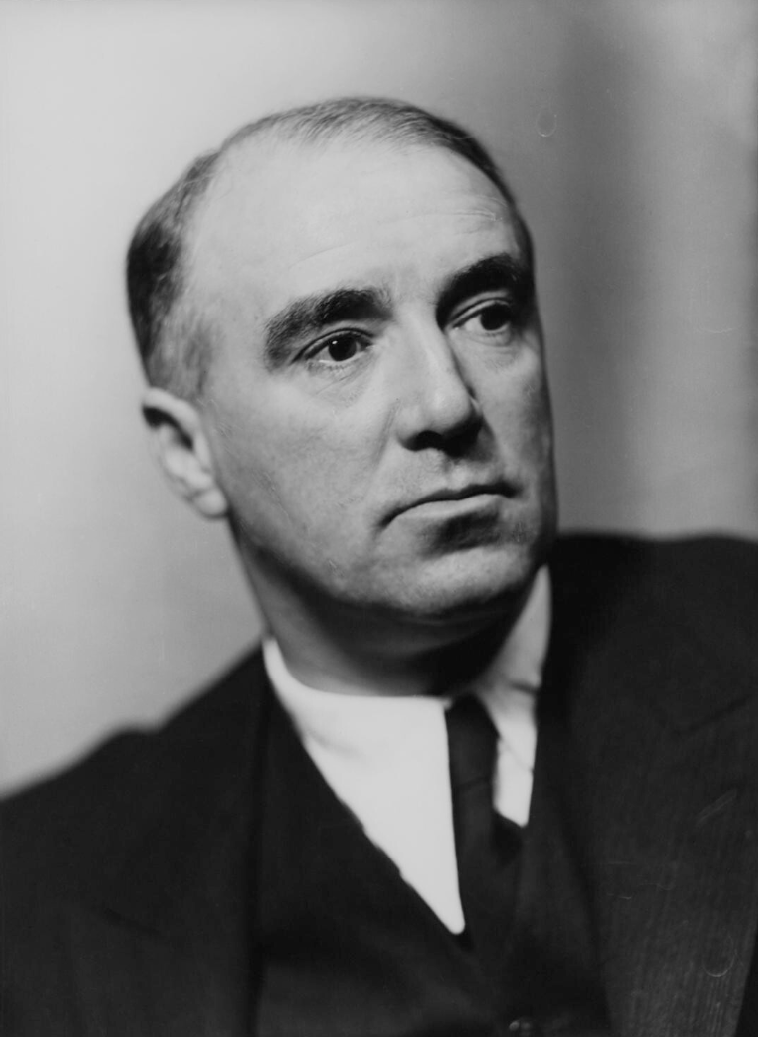
- Pollitt in 1934

3rd & 5th General Secretary of the Communist Party of Great Britain (Note: In May 1929, Pollitt assumed leadership of the CPGB with the title of 'Organisational Secretary', before becoming General Secretary in July 1929.)
- In office June 1941 – 13 May 1956
- Preceded by: R. Palme Dutt
- Succeeded by: John Gollan
- In office July 1929 – 11 October 1939
- Preceded by: J. R. Campbell
- Succeeded by: R. Palme Dutt

General Secretary of the National Minority Movement
- In office August 23, 1924 – c. July 1929
- Preceded by: Office established
- Succeeded by: Office abolished

Personal details
- Born: 22 November 1890 Droylsden, Lancashire, England
- Died: 27 June 1960 (aged 69) Great Australian Bight, aboard SS Orion
- Resting place: Golders Green Crematorium, Golders Green, London
- Party: Communist Party of Great Britain
- Other political affiliations: Workers' Socialist Federation National Minority Movement
- Spouse: Marjorie Brewer (m. 1925)
- Children: 2
- Parent(s): Samuel Pollitt; Mary Louisa
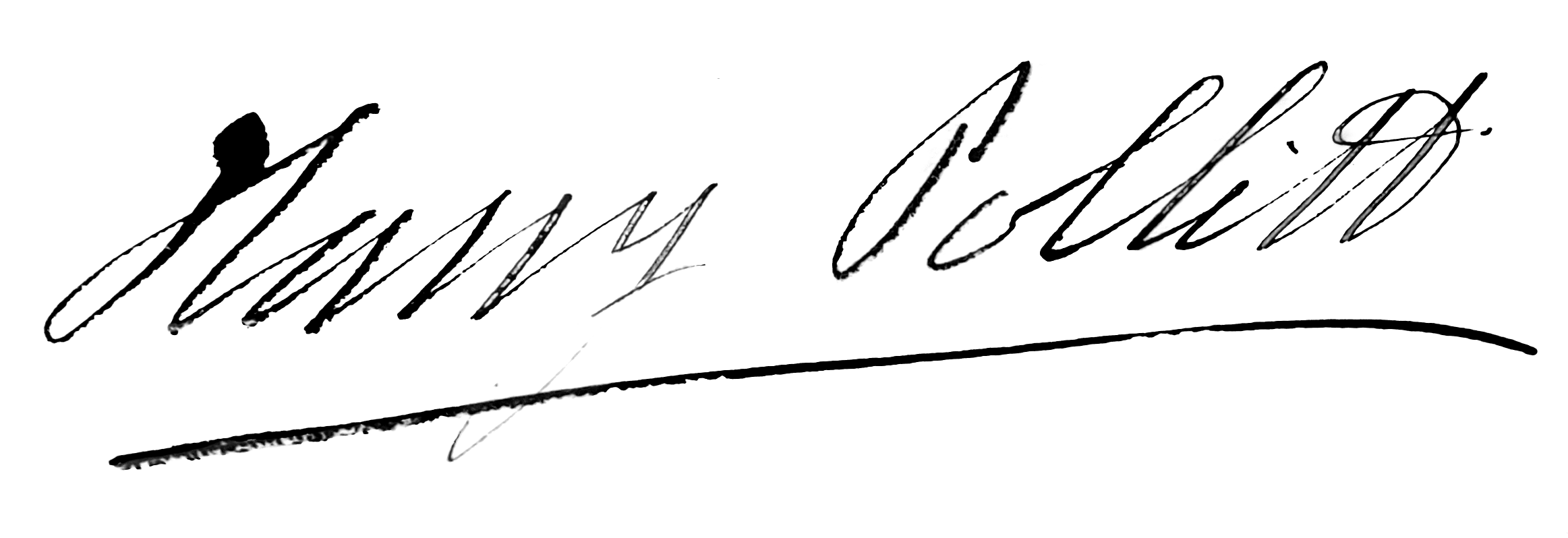
- Signature

Harry Pollitt (22 November 1890 – 27 June 1960) was a British communist who served as the General Secretary of the Communist Party of Great Britain (CPGB) from July 1929 to September 1939 and again from 1941 until his death in 1960. Pollitt spent most of his life advocating communism. Ideologically a Marxist–Leninist, Pollitt was an adherent particularly of Joseph Stalin even after Stalin's death and rise of Nikita Khrushchev. Pollitt's acts included opposition to the Allied intervention in the Russian Civil War and Polish–Soviet War, support for the Spanish Republicans during the Spanish Civil War, both support for and opposition to the war against Nazi Germany, defence of the communist coup in Czechoslovakia, and support for the 1956 Soviet invasion of Hungary.

He contested seats in a number of parliamentary elections, but never won. Throughout his time as leader of CPGB, he was in direct secret radio contact with Moscow as CPGB's "Code Holder", and was monitored by the British security services.

== Early life ==
=== Childhood and early career ===
Pollitt was born on 22 November 1890 in Droylsden, Lancashire. He was the second of six children of Samuel Pollitt (1863–1933), a blacksmith's striker, and his wife, Mary Louisa (1868–1939), a cotton spinner, daughter of William Charlesworth, a joiner. Pollitt's parents were socialists, and his mother was a member of the Independent Labour Party before joining the Communist party when it was formed in 1920.

Three of his siblings died in infancy. The death of his younger sister Winifred particularly affected Pollitt, who said that he would "pay God out. Pay everybody out for making my sister suffer". Pollitt began work at the age of 12, alongside his mother. The suffering of his mother, who regularly worked standing in water wearing only wooden clogs, also particularly affected Pollitt, who later said that he "swore that when I grew up I would pay the bosses out for the hardships that she suffered". Pollitt later became a boilermaker and metal craftsman.

During the First World War, Pollitt was exempt from conscription as a skilled worker. Pollitt gained experience leading a strike in Southampton in 1915 and later described being inspired by the 1917 October Revolution, saying it showed that "workers like me ... had defeated the boss class". By this time Pollitt was already a member of Sylvia Pankhurst's Workers' Socialist Federation and had gained experience with public speaking.

=== Communist campaigner ===
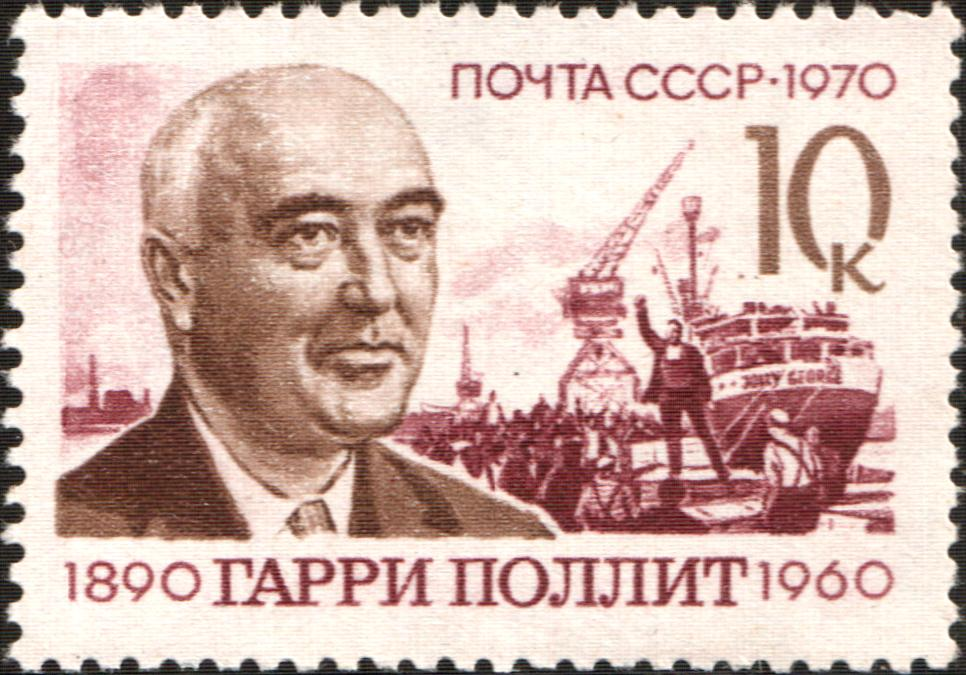
A USSR stamp of 1970 commemorating Harry Pollitt and his role in preventing the SS Jolly George from carrying arms to Poland

In September 1919, Pollitt was appointed full-time national organiser of the Hands Off Russia campaign to protest against Allied intervention in the Russian Civil War, for which Pankhurst had obtained funding from Moscow. Pollitt tired of his desk-bound job and went back to work in the Port of London. Whilst there, Pollitt helped convince London dock workers not to load the freighter SS Jolly George on 10 May 1920, as she was bound with munitions for Poland, which at that time was fighting against Soviet Russia in the Polish–Soviet War. With support from Ernest Bevin, then a senior official in the dockers' union, the ship's owners were forced by the dockers to unload her cargo of munitions, and she sailed on 15 May 1920 without them. Pollitt failed to prevent a number of other ships laden with arms for Poland, including the Danish steamer Neptune on 1 May 1920, and two Belgian barges.

In August 1920 the Communist Party of Great Britain (CPGB) was founded by an agreement unifying various left-wing bodies, including the British Socialist Party, of which Pollitt was a member in addition to his WSF membership. Pollitt, thus a founding member of the party, attended the CPGB's founding "Utility Convention". The following year Pollitt visited the Soviet Union. During his visit, he met and shook hands with Vladimir Lenin, an experience he later described as the greatest day of his life. According to the October 1921 issue of Freedom, on his return Pollitt stated that he had seen evidence that Russian anarchists were plotting to restore Tsarism and spoke approvingly of the suppression of anarchism in Russia.

Pollitt was involved in a criminal case against five men he accused of kidnapping him in March 1925 whilst he was on his way to address a meeting of communists in Liverpool. According to Pollitt, he had been taken off a train and held in Wales over a weekend in order to prevent him reaching Liverpool, though treated mildly. The men, who were all members of the British Fascists, were acquitted by the jury following testimony that characterised the "kidnapping" as unserious and a denial from the head of the Liverpool branch of the fascist party that they had authorised any kidnapping of Pollitt. The Labour party conference that year passed a motion condemning the acquittal by the jury of those accused of kidnapping Pollitt as an example of class-prejudice, and calling for representation of workers on juries.

On 10 October 1925, Pollitt married Marjorie Brewer at Caxton Hall, Westminster. Marjorie Edna Brewer (1902–1991) was a communist schoolteacher; the marriage eventually produced a son and a daughter. His best man and witness was fellow CPGB activist and organiser Percy Glading, who would later be convicted of spying for the Soviet Union and imprisoned. A week later, Pollitt was one of 12 members of the Communist Party convicted at the Old Bailey on charges of seditious libel and incitement to mutiny. Pollitt was given a 12-month sentence as a previous offender, which he served in Wandsworth prison. Historian C. L. Mowat described the trial as "the chief instance of a purely political trial in the interwar years".

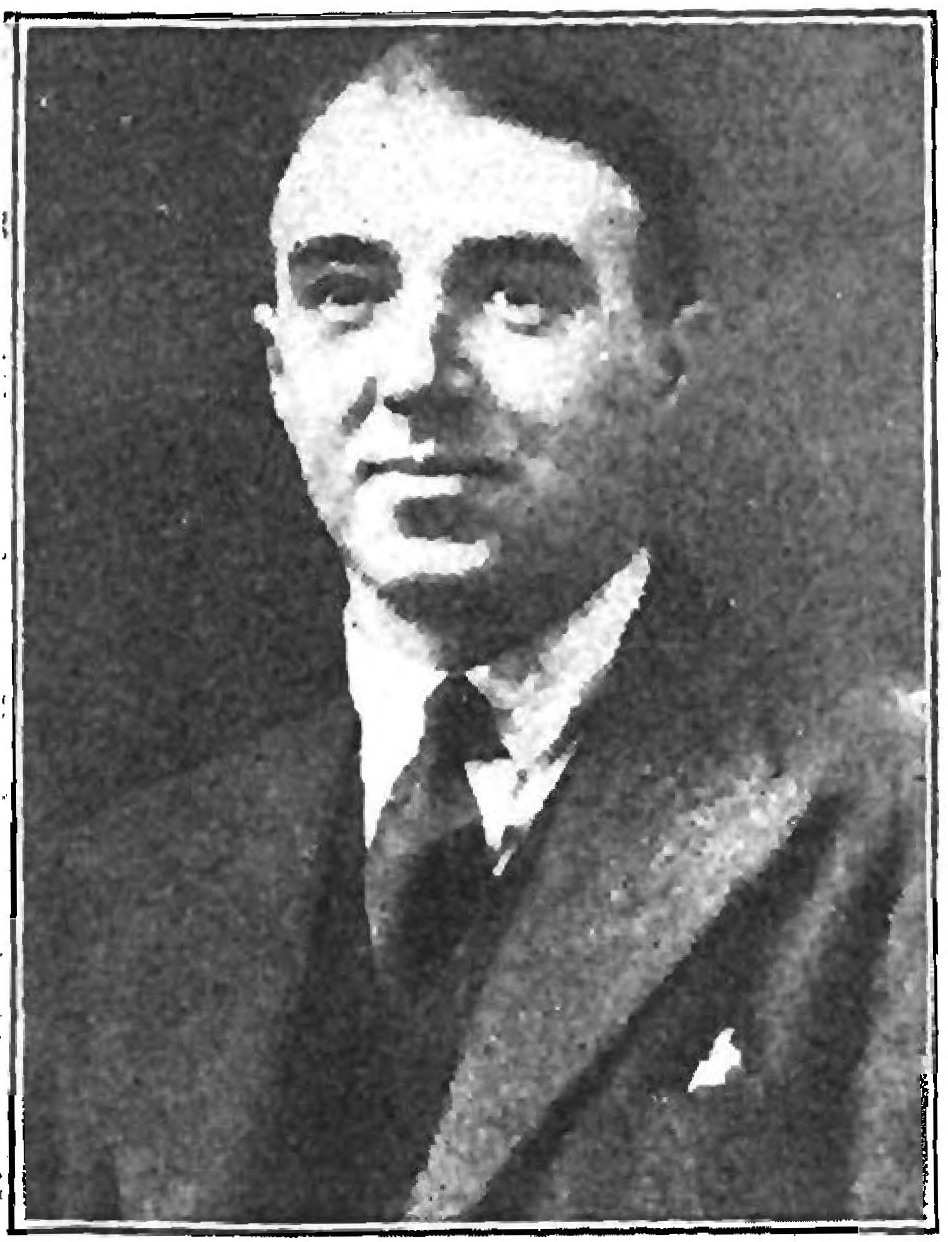
Pollitt c. 1928

Pollitt travelled again to Moscow in October 1927, and attended a meeting at which the CPGB was roundly criticised for its failure to criticise the British labour movement. During the same visit, Pollitt met privately with Joseph Stalin and Nikolai Bukharin, who, over Pollitt's protests, ordered that the CPGB should abandon its "United Front" policy and campaign as widely as possible at the next election, even where the CPGB stood no chance of winning and would draw votes away from the Labour candidate, thus allowing the Conservatives to win. This policy of attacking other left-wing organisations was known as the "Class-against-Class" policy, and remained in place until 1932 when, as leader, Pollitt was able to get it relaxed for trade unions, though it remained in place for other parts of the left.

In addition to his role in the CPGB, from the early 1920s Pollitt served as national secretary of the British Bureau of the Red International of Labour Unions (AKA Profintern), an organisation aimed at countering the Amsterdam International and rallying militant trade unionists within existing unions to win those unions over to communism. The Comintern characterised the British Bureau as "not an organisation of unions, but only of revolutionary minorities of unions". On the founding of the National Minority Movement (NMM) in 1924, the British Bureau was folded into it and Pollitt was made its national secretary, a position he remained in until 1929. As secretary of the NMM, Pollitt opposed trying to form new communist-oriented unions aimed at replacing established unions under the "Class-against-Class" policy.

== Leadership of the CPGB ==
=== Pre-World War II and the Great Purge ===
In 1929 the CPGB elected Pollitt General Secretary with Joseph Stalin's approval. Pollitt replaced Albert Inkpin, who had attracted disapproval from the Comintern by opposing the "Class-against-Class" policy and perceived softness towards others on the left. On his appointment, Stalin told him, "You have taken a difficult job on, but I believe you will tackle it all right". Pollitt was selected as he had impressed people in the CPGB and in Moscow as a Comintern loyalist and effective organiser, particularly when representing the Comintern at a meeting of the Communist Party USA in March 1929. Pollitt stated that he saw his role as defending the Communist Party of the Soviet Union (CPSU) "through thick and thin". Unlike Inkpin, Pollitt was willing to criticise the Labour party as "social-fascists".

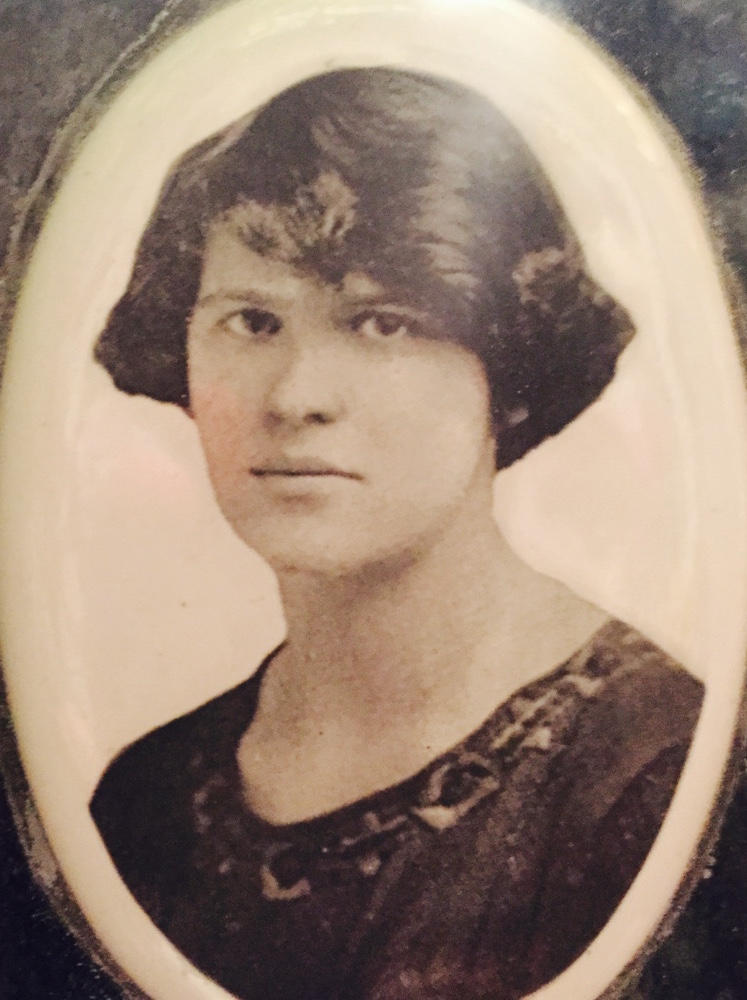
Rose Cohen, a CPGB member and friend of Pollitt, executed during the Great Purge

Pollitt made clear in his public statements his loyalties to the Soviet Union and to CPSU General Secretary Joseph Stalin. He was a defender of the Moscow Trials, in which Stalin had his political and military opponents executed or otherwise disposed of. In the Daily Worker of 12 March 1938 Pollitt told the world that "the trials in Moscow represent a new triumph in the history of progress". The article was illustrated by a photograph of Stalin with Nikolai Yezhov, whose likeness would be retouched out of the photograph following his 1940 fall from favour and execution.

In 1934 Pollitt and Tom Mann, treasurer of the National Unemployed Workers' Movement (NUWM), were summonsed on charges of sedition in relation to speeches they gave in Trealaw and Ferndale in Wales. Pollitt and Mann were acquitted of all charges by Swansea assizes. The arrests took place on the eve of a meeting in Bermondsey which Mann and Pollitt were due to attend that was to be the culmination of the 1934 Hunger March.

Pollitt travelled again to Moscow in 1935. Whilst there he was invited to make a broadcast on the BBC radio programme The Citizen and His Government, commenting on the difference between the UK and the USSR. The invitation was withdrawn after opposition from the Foreign Office. He did not appear on BBC radio until the 1945 election.

When Pollitt's friend Rose Cohen, to whom he had proposed marriage on a number of occasions, was put on trial in Moscow in 1937 during Stalin's Great Purge, the CPGB opposed efforts by the British government to get Cohen released, describing her arrest as an internal affair of the Soviet Union. Pollitt privately tried to intervene on her behalf, but by the time he did so she had already been shot. Pollitt placed himself at risk by questioning Cohen's arrest in this fashion, as Béla Kun had, under torture, identified him as a "Trotskyist" and "British spy", though Osip Piatnitsky had refused to confirm these accusations when arrested by the NKVD in 1937. Twenty years after Cohen's death, Pollitt requested information from Moscow about whether she was still alive, stating, untruthfully, that there was press interest in Britain about her whereabouts.

In contrast to Pollitt's concern over Rose Cohen, when CPGB member Freda Utley tried to get Pollitt to intercede with Moscow on behalf of her Russian husband, who was arrested and died in a labour camp in 1938, Pollitt refused. Pollitt also failed to intervene to help George Fles and his wife, Arcadi Berdichevsky and his wife, and a number of other British communists who were arrested by the NKVD and tortured, shot, or imprisoned in the Gulag during Stalin's purge.

Pollitt defied Moscow by opposing the introduction of conscription in Britain in 1939. Pollitt's opposition to conscription led to protests from the French Communist Party, which had supported conscription in France.

=== Spanish Civil War ===
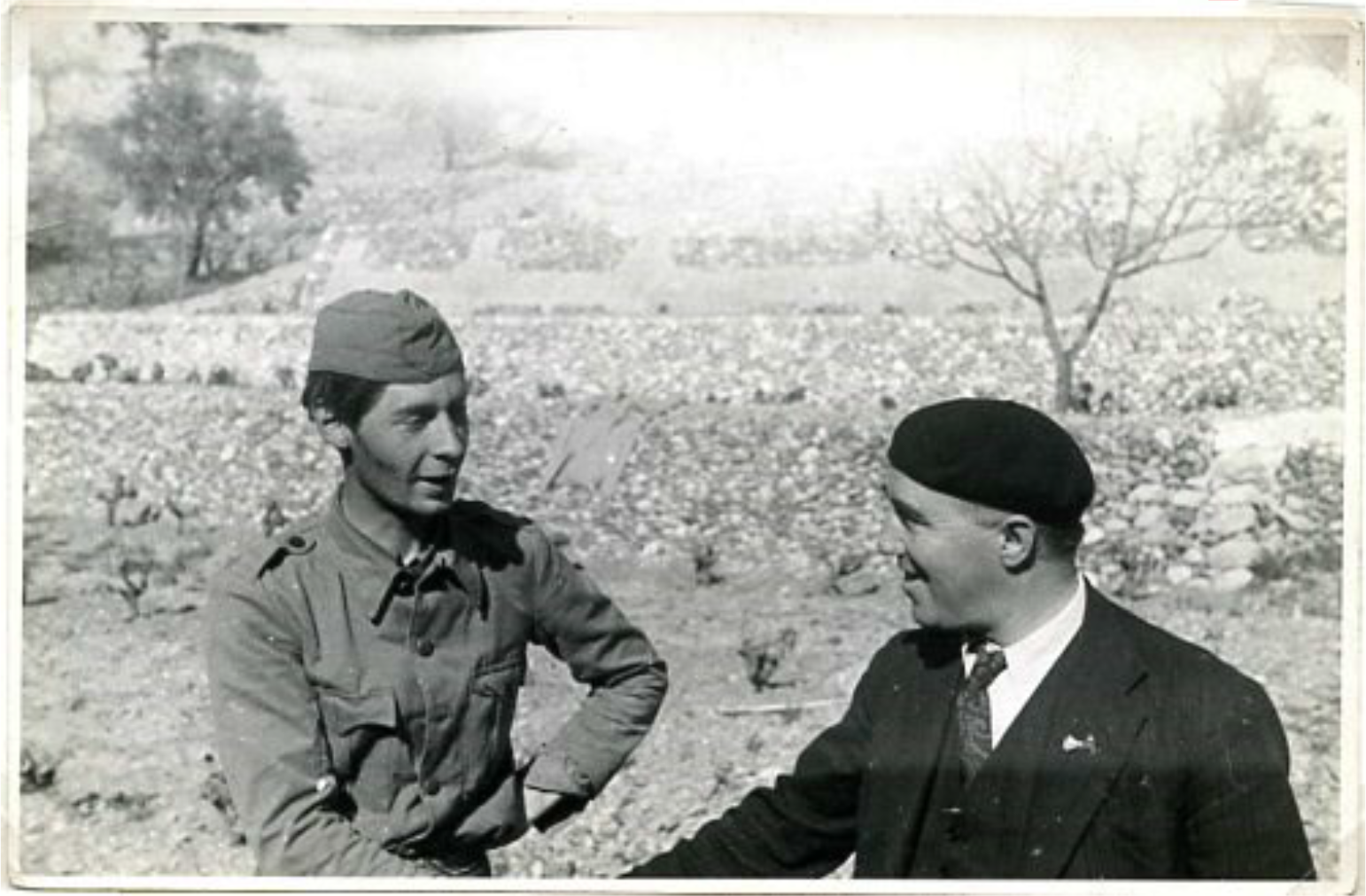
Pollitt (right) meets David Guest in Spain

During the 1936–39 Spanish Civil War Pollitt visited the country five times, each time giving speeches to the British Battalion that was part of one of the International Brigades supporting the Republican side. Pollitt also played a role in approving or vetoing applications from British volunteers to join the International Brigades. One such veto was against George Orwell, whom Pollitt believed to be politically unreliable. Pollitt wrote letters of condolence to the families of British communists killed in Spain.

In August 1937, Pollitt intervened in a dispute between the leadership of the British Battalion regarding tactics, the reliability of Spanish Republican troops that had fought with the battalion and other matters. He recalled the five leading members of the battalion involved in the dispute (Tapsell, Cunningham, Aitken, Copeman and Williams) to Britain. Copeman and Tapsell, who had been critical of Spanish Republican forces and tactics, were ordered to return to Spain, whilst Cunningham, Williams and Aitken were ordered to remain in Britain.

=== Communications with Moscow and surveillance by MI5 ===
From 1933 until November 1939, Pollitt was in radio contact with Moscow as the CPGB's "code holder". Contact ceased when he resigned as leader of the CPGB and the code used to communicate with him was changed, though it was re-established in 1941.

From 1931, Olga Gray, an MI5 agent, infiltrated the party and was for a time Pollitt's personal secretary. In Operation MASK (1934–1937), John Tiltman and his colleagues of the Government Code and Cypher School were able to break the code and decrypt radio messages between Moscow and some of its foreign parties, such as the CPGB. They revealed the Comintern's close supervision of the Communist Party and Pollitt, as well as the substantial financial support the CPGB received from Moscow. Among other things, Pollitt was instructed to rebut news leaks about a Stalinist purge. Some messages were addressed to code names, while others were signed by Pollitt. In his transmissions to Moscow, Pollitt regularly pleaded for more funding from the Soviet Union. One 1936 coded instruction advised Pollitt to publicise the plight of Ernst Thälmann, a German Communist leader who had been arrested by the Nazis and who later died at Sachsenhausen concentration camp. Pollitt replied that he was "having difficulties" getting British statesmen to make public declarations supporting Thälmann but that they promised they would speak privately with German officials in London. In one of the more amusing dispatches, Pollitt (1936) informed his Soviet contact about a recent visit to France to make campaign appearances for candidates from the French Communist Party. "At great inconvenience went to Paris to speak in the election campaign". Pollitt went on to complain that he "kept sitting two days and comrades refused to allow me to speak. Such treatment as I received in Paris is a scandal."

Pollitt also told Gray, whose class background would make her less conspicuous aboard an ocean liner than the CPGB's mostly working-class membership, with delivering money, instructions, and a questionnaire to a contact in India. The strain of this mission caused Gray to resign as Pollitt's secretary, though she remained in touch with Percy Glading, and in 1937 provided evidence that led to the conviction of Glading on spying charges.

CPGB members, including Harry Pollitt, were the subject of monitoring by the British security services in the 1930s, '40s, and '50s. These included the planting of a listening device in their King Street offices in 1942. MI5 also had an unidentified source close to Percy Glading who regularly reported Pollitt's doings to them (including Pollitt's dissatisfaction with Reg Birch); MI5 and Special Branch had sources at Pollitt's 60th birthday celebrations.

=== World War II ===
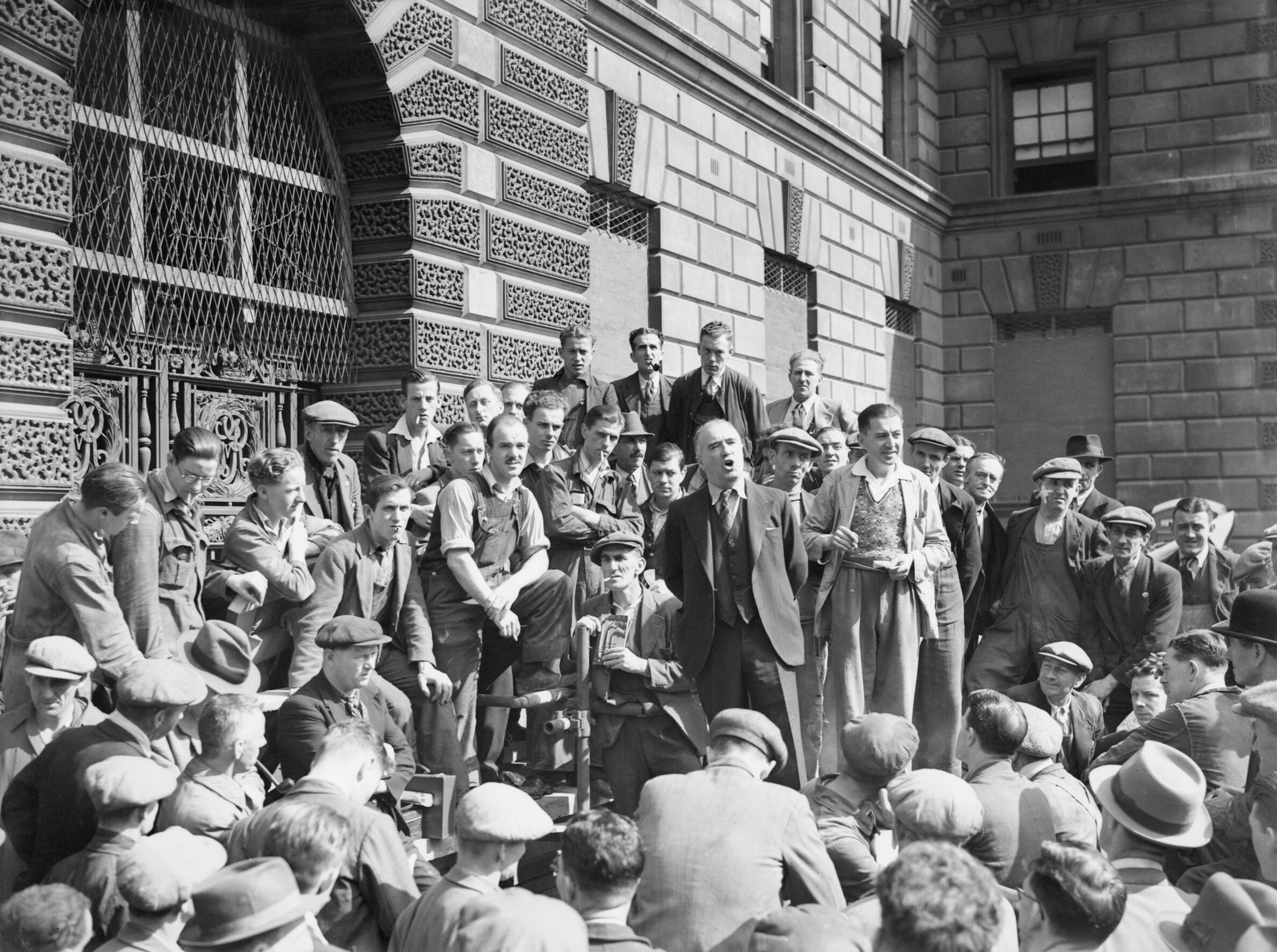
Harry Pollitt giving a public speech to workers in Whitehall, London, 1941

With the outbreak of war between Britain and Nazi Germany on 3 September 1939, despite the Molotov–Ribbentrop pact, Pollitt welcomed the British declaration of war on Nazi Germany, calling for a "struggle on two fronts", involving the "military defeat of Hitler and the political defeat of Chamberlain" in his pamphlet How To Win The War, which was also ambivalent about rearmament. When this turned out to be contrary to the Comintern line received from Moscow on 14 September, and reiterated by the CPGB's Comintern representative on 24 September (as Rajani Palme Dutt, who succeeded him as General Secretary, had warned him it would be) he was forced to resign. By November 1939, Pollitt had disavowed his pro-war view, saying that by supporting the war he had "played into the hands of the class enemy".

During 1940–1941, under instructions from Moscow, the party followed a policy of "revolutionary defeatism". This was a strategy that assumed that the goals of the Communist Party could be accelerated by quickening the defeat of Britain in the war against Nazi Germany. Douglas Hyde stated that the attitude of those advocating this policy was to regard "the almost inevitable defeat of Britain [...] as a magnificent opportunity". Pollitt criticised the war policies of the Chamberlain government, describing them as seeking to exploit the war against "Hitler's fascism" to "impose certain aspects of that same fascism on the workers". The anti-war position of the CPGB during 1939–1941 was later cited by James Middleton, along with the CPGB's perceived lack of independence from Moscow, as a reason for refusing Harry Pollitt's application to affiliate the CPGB with the Labour Party.

On instructions from Georgi Dimitrov in Moscow, Pollitt was retained in a six-member political bureau after his removal. He was reinstated as the leader of the CPGB after Operation Barbarossa the Germany invasion of the Soviet Union in 1941, again in response to instructions received from Moscow. Moscow also overturned Dutt's previous position of criticising the Churchill government and characterising the war as a struggle for socialism, instead endorsing Pollitt's position of offering full support to the Churchill government and avoiding inflaming anti-socialist opinion. Dimitrov had doubts about Pollitt's reliability, and in 1942 questioned what he saw as Pollitt's "strange behaviour" in allowing what he believed to be the penetration of the CPGB by the British security services, saying that he did not know whether Pollitt was doing this "deliberately" or if "English intelligence is taking advantage of his lack of vigilance".

After Barbarossa, Harry Pollitt became a strong supporter of the opening of a second front in Europe against Nazi Germany by the Western Allies. Pollitt also urged Jawaharlal Nehru to moderate his demands for Indian independence for the duration of the war. When strike action was proposed during the war, Pollitt was opposed to it as it would damage the war effort. Pollitt's adherence to an electoral truce unilaterally called by the CPGB after Barbarossa led to instances of CPGB campaigning in favour of Conservative candidates in wartime by-elections.

As the CPGB's membership of the Comintern had been a barrier to affiliation with the Labour Party, Pollitt took the opportunity given by the dissolution of the Comintern in May 1943 to apply again to affiliate with the Labour Party but this was again rejected by Labour's central committee, who again cited the CPGB's previous opposition to the war against Nazi Germany. At the 1945 general election, Politt's CPGB pursued a "Progressive Majority" strategy, and sought to coordinate its electoral strategy with the Labour Party, though the Labour Party did not reciprocate. As a result, rather than putting up 50 candidates as had been proposed, the CPGB put up candidates in only 21 seats, of whom only two were returned.

=== Post WWII and later life ===
Pollitt supported the 1948 communist coup in Czechoslovakia, characterising it as the work of "millions of lads" who were "led by their Shop stewards" to overthrow capitalism. During 1948 Pollitt also condemned the Marshall Plan, calling it a war plan and called for Ernest Bevin, the Foreign Secretary, to be dismissed over what he described as the deliberate prolongation of the talks on the Marshall Plan and the economic impact of Bevin's policies.

In 1951 the CPGB adopted The British Road To Socialism as their party programme, replacing For Soviet Britain. The programme was championed by Pollitt, committed the CPGB to independence from Moscow, and a constitutional or parliamentary (as opposed to revolutionary) path to power. It stated that the CPGB was committed to decision-making through internal party democracy. In spite of these commitments, the programme had actually been personally dictated to Pollitt by Stalin in a series of secret meetings in the Kremlin.

On the death of Stalin, Pollitt wrote that he had been "the greatest man of our time". He went on to say that "[n]ever before in the history of humanity ha[d] there been such universal grief" as the people of the world "mourned him with tears in their eyes and with deep uncontrollable sorrow". Pollitt was also a member of the guard of honour at Stalin's funeral.

The advent of Nikita Khrushchev presented the CPGB with problems. The CPGB had followed the Moscow line to attack Tito's neutralist government in Yugoslavia; when Khrushchev visited Belgrade in 1955, the CPGB was forced to recant these attacks. Pollitt faced another crisis when Khrushchev, in his 1956 Secret Speech, attacked the legacy of Stalin. Pollitt's embarrassment was heightened by the fact that he had been present in Moscow for the party congress at which the speech took place, but along with the other foreign delegates had been excluded from the session at which it had been given.

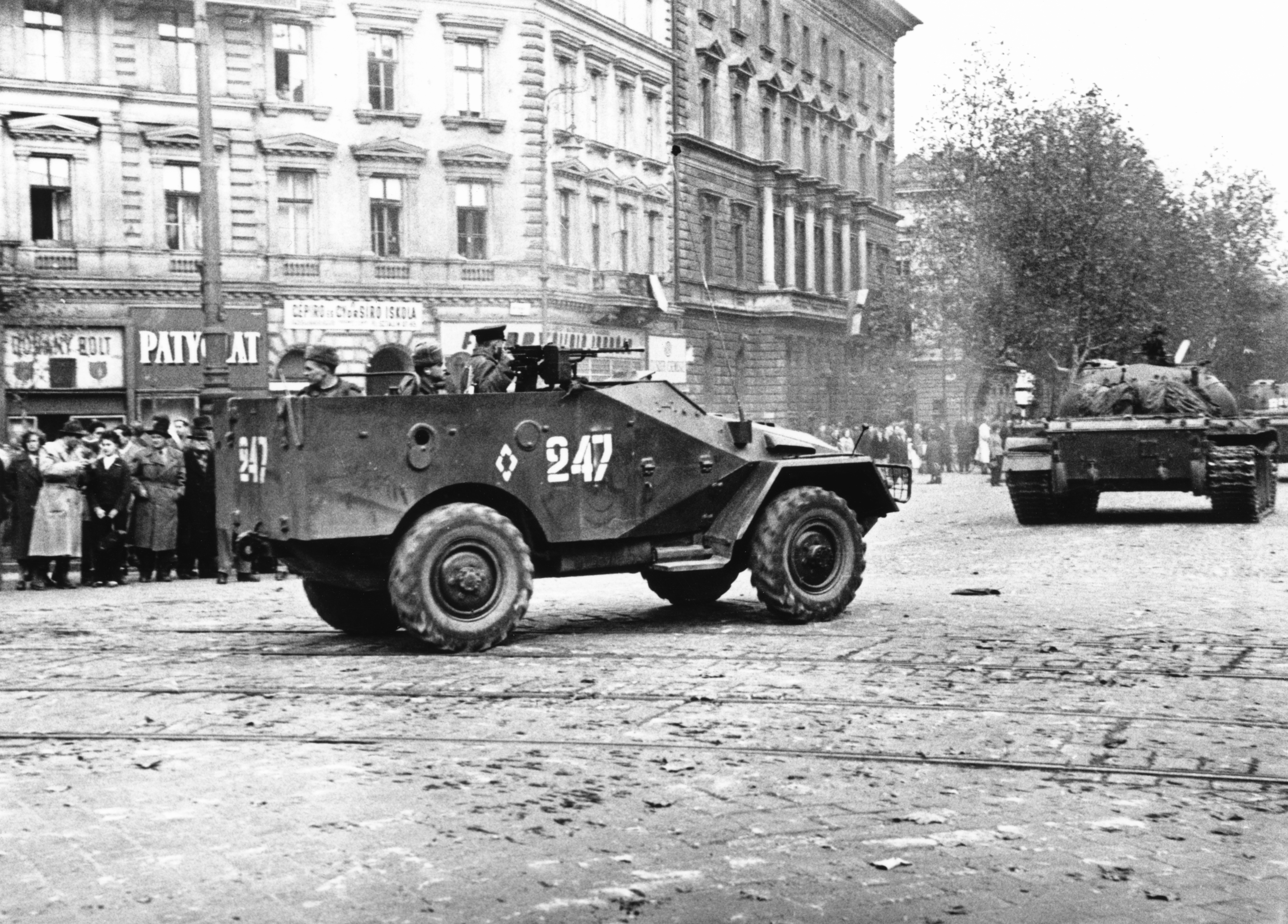
Soviet troops in Budapest, November 1956

Pollitt, suffering from worsening health in his final years, resigned as General Secretary in May 1956, with John Gollan succeeding him, and was appointed CP Chairman. When Khruschev's denunciation of Stalin was formally made public the following month, Pollitt stated that he was "too old to go into reverse and denigrate a man he had admired above all others for more than a quarter of a century". Pollitt also refused to take down a portrait of Stalin that hung in his living room, saying that "He's staying there as long as I'm alive".

The Soviet repression of the Hungarian Revolution of November 1956 made the CPGB crisis worse, particularly as the party had taken the position that the Eastern Bloc countries, of which Hungary was one, were allowed to do as they pleased. Pollitt supported the Soviet invasion of Hungary, stating that it had "saved Hungary from fascism". Most of the party's intellectual figures, including Doris Lessing and E. P. Thompson, and many ordinary members resigned. Others, likeEric Hobsbawm, chose to stay in the party to try to reform it.

In 1959, when British communist journalist Alan Winnington (whom Pollitt had recruited to the CPGB) became disillusioned with Chinese politics, Pollitt arranged for him to travel from China to East Germany, where Winnington spent the remainder of his life as an author and film actor. Winnington was extremely grateful, and after Pollitt's death he described him as "the greatest Englishman I have known."

== Electoral record ==
Pollitt contested a number of parliamentary elections, but did not win any. His first electoral outing was in the Durham, Seaham constituency in 1929, where he received 1,431 votes (2.9% of the total vote). He then contested the London East End Stepney, Whitechapel, and St. George's constituency in 1930, where he received 2,106 votes (9.6% of votes). He contested the same constituency again in 1931 and received 2,658 votes (11.2% of vote). In 1933 he contested the Derbyshire, Clay Cross constituency and received 3,434 votes (10.6% of the vote). In a 1940 by-election in the Silvertown division of West Ham he received only 966 votes (6.2% of the vote) to the Labour candidate's 14,343.

He stood as the CPGB candidate for election in Rhondda East in South Wales three times. In 1935, he lost to the Labour candidate 61.8% to 38.2%, with a margin of 8,433 votes. In the 1945 general election he came within a thousand votes of winning the seat from the Labour candidate, with 15,761 votes (45.5% of the vote) compared to the Labour candidate's 16,733 votes (48.4% of the vote). In 1950 he suffered a heavy defeat, receiving only 4,463 votes (12.7% of the vote) compared to the Labour candidate's 26,645 votes (75.9% of the vote).

== Death and legacy ==
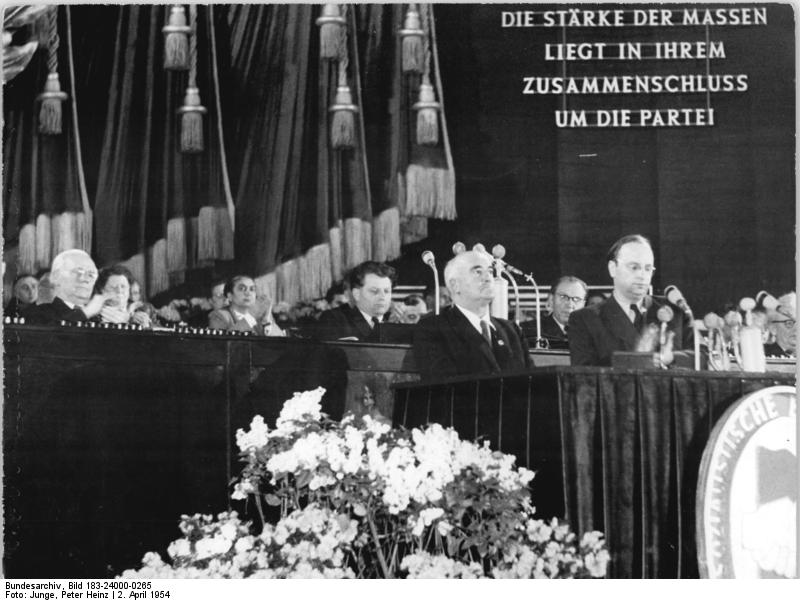
Harry Pollitt attending the 4th party conference of the East German communist party, 1954

After years of worsening health, Pollitt died at age 69 of a cerebral haemorrhage while returning on the SS Orion from a speaking tour of Australia on 27 June 1960. The liner had departed from Adelaide en route to Fremantle, when, at 2 a.m., Pollitt suffered a stroke.

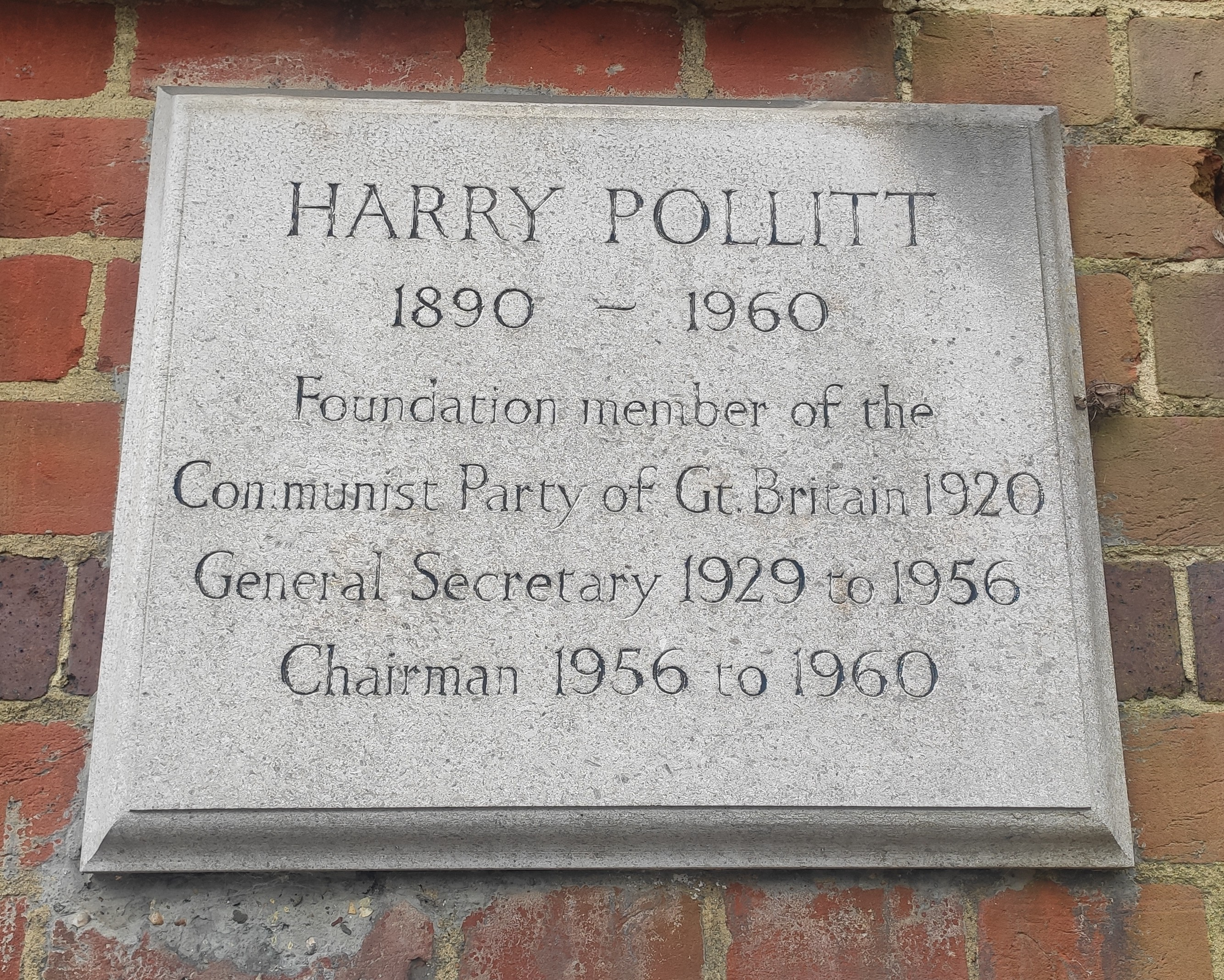
Plaque dedicated to Pollitt at Golders Green Crematorium

He was cremated at Golders Green on 9 July, and was survived by his wife and two children, Brian and Jean.

The Labour History Archive and Study Centre at the People's History Museum in Manchester holds the collection of the Communist Party of Great Britain. This collection includes the papers of Pollitt, which covers the years 1920 to 1960.

In 1971, a Soviet-operated, East German-built Type 17 merchant ship was named after Pollitt. The ship was renamed Natalie in 1996 and scrapped the next year. A plaque dedicated to the memory of Pollitt was unveiled by the Mayor of Tameside on 22 March 1995 outside Droylsden Library. He is also commemorated in the song "The Ballad of Harry Pollitt", which was originally written during his lifetime, and hence inaccurately describes his murder. The American folk band The Limeliters included the song on their 1961 album The Slightly Fabulous Limeliters. The song was heavily criticised in the April 1972 edition of Marxism Today, the official journal of the CPGB, as "sickening" and "full of the vilest insults against the memory of Harry Pollitt".

== Notes ==
Party political offices
Preceded by Albert Inkpin	General Secretary of the Communist Party of Great Britain; 1929 – 1939	Succeeded by Rajani Palme Dutt
Preceded by Rajani Palme Dutt	General Secretary of the Communist Party of Great Britain; 1941 – 1956	Succeeded by John Gollan
