= R. Palme Dutt =

British communist and journalist (1896–1974)

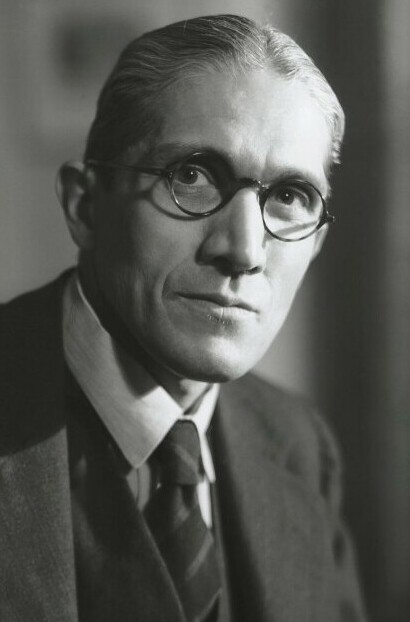
- Palme Dutt, 1943.

4th General Secretary of the Communist Party of Great Britain
- In office October 1939 – June 1941
- Preceded by: Harry Pollitt
- Succeeded by: Harry Pollitt

Personal details
- Born: Rajani Palme Dutt; 19 June 1896 Cambridge, Cambridgeshire, England
- Died: 20 December 1974 (aged 78) Highgate, London, England
- Party: Communist Party of Great Britain
- Spouse: Salme Pekkala-Dutt (m. 1924; died 1964)
- Parents: Upendra Dutt (father); Anna Palme (mother)
- Relatives: Olof Palme (first-cousin, once removed); Hella Wuolijoki (sister-in-law); Erkki Tuomioja (great-nephew)
- Education: The Perse School
- Alma mater: Balliol College, Oxford
- Occupation: Editor of Workers' Weekly

Rajani Palme Dutt (Bengali pronunciation: [rɔd͡ʒoni pam dɔtːo]; 19 June 1896 – 20 December 1974) was a British political figure, journalist and theoretician who served as the fourth general secretary of the Communist Party of Great Britain during World War II from October 1939 to June 1941. His classic book India Today heralded the Marxist approach in Indian historiography.

== Early life and family ==
Rajani Palme Dutt was born in 1896 on Mill Road in Cambridge, England. His father, Dr. Upendra Dutt, was a Bengali surgeon, his mother Anna Palme was Swedish. Dr. Upendra Dutt belonged to the family of Romesh Chunder Dutt. Anna Palme was a great aunt of the future Prime Minister of Sweden Olof Palme. Rajani's sister was the statistician Elna Palme Dutt, who went on to become an official of the International Labour Organization in Geneva. He, along with his older brother Clemens Palme Dutt, was a founding member of the Communist Party of Great Britain.

Dutt was educated at the Perse School, Cambridge and Balliol College, Oxford where he obtained a first-class degree in Classics, after being suspended for a time because of his activities as a conscientious objector in World War I, during which his writing was deemed subversive propaganda.

On 5 August 1924, Palme Dutt married Salme Pekkala-Dutt, an Estonian-British communist politician, essayist, writer and translator, in Stockholm. Palme Dutt had come to Great Britain in 1920 as a representative of the Communist International. Palme Dutt was the brother-in-law of the Finnish–Estonian writer Hella Wuolijoki and was the great-uncle of the Finnish politician Erkki Tuomioja.

== Political career ==
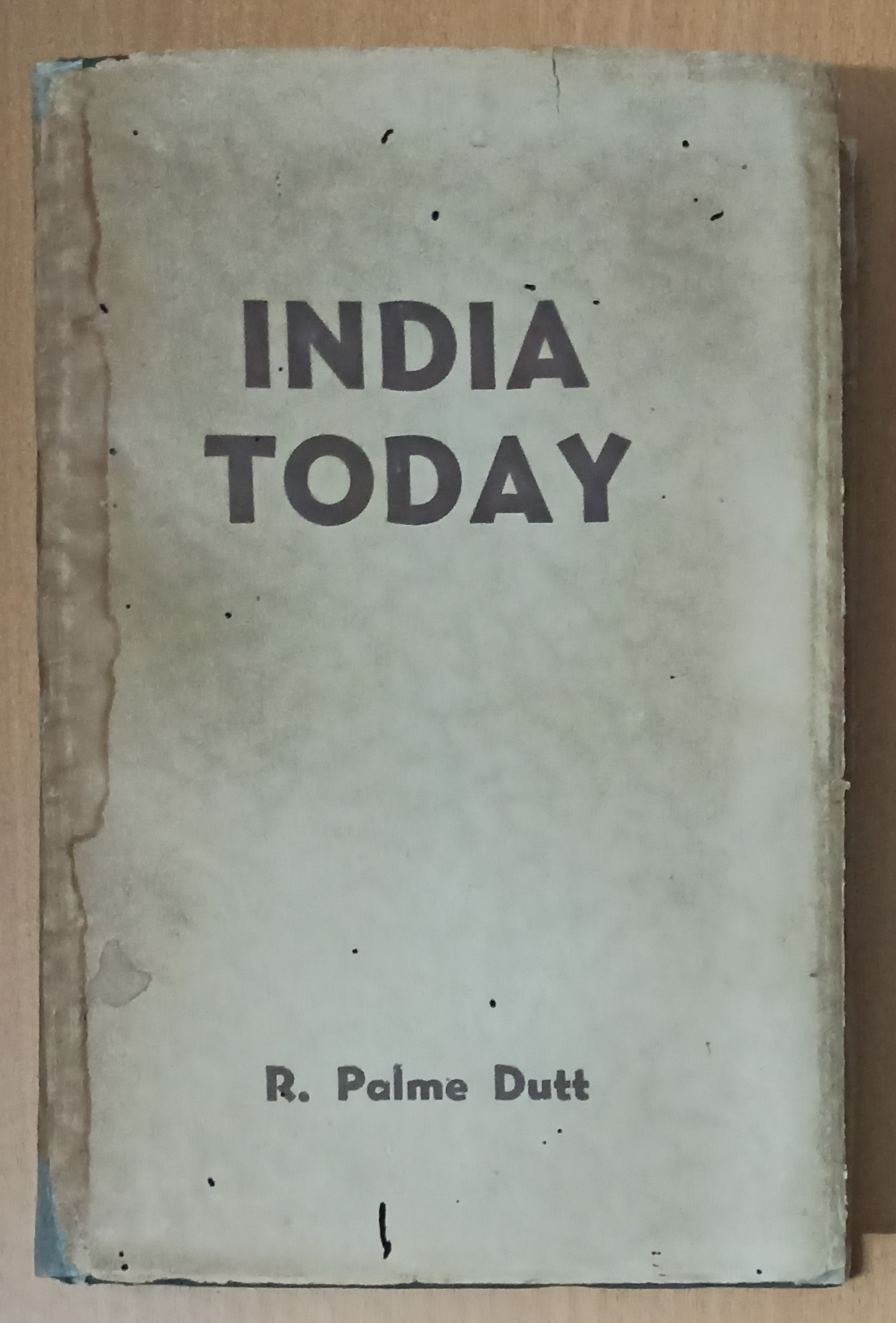
India Today, 1947 Edition, published by People’s Publishing House, Bombay, India.

Dutt made his first connections with the Socialist Movement in England during his school days, before the outbreak of the First World War. He was expelled from Oxford University in October 1917 for organising a socialist meeting. He joined the British Labour Movement as a full time worker in 1919, when he joined the Labour Research Department, a left-wing statistical bureau. Together with Harry Pollitt he was one of the founder members of the Communist Party of Great Britain (CPGB) in 1920. In 1921 he founded a monthly magazine called Labour Monthly, a publication that he edited until his death, and also visited India.

In 1922, Dutt was named the editor of the party's weekly newspaper, the Workers' Weekly.

Dutt was on the executive committee of the CPGB from 1923 to 1965 and was the party's chief theorist for many years.

Dutt first visited the Soviet Union in 1923, where he attended deliberations of the Executive Committee of the Communist International (ECCI) relating to the British movement. He was elected an alternate to the ECCI Presidium in 1924.

Following an illness in 1925 which forced him to stand down as editor of Workers' Weekly, Dutt spent several years in Belgium and Sweden as a representative of the Comintern. He also played an important role for the Comintern by supervising the Communist Party of India for some years.

Palme Dutt was loyal to the Soviet Union and to the Stalinist line. In 1939, when the CPGB General Secretary Harry Pollitt supported the United Kingdom entering World War II, Palme Dutt promoted Joseph Stalin's line and forced Pollitt's temporary resignation. As a result, he became the party's General Secretary until Pollitt was reappointed in 1941, after the German invasion of the Soviet Union cause a reversal in the party's attitude on the war.

His book Fascism and Social Revolution presents a scathing criticism and analysis of fascism, with a study of the rise of fascism in Germany, Italy and other countries. He defined fascism as a movement, that historically developed without any guiding theory - a movement that substitutes for its theory "a ragbag of borrowings from every source to cover the realities and practice of modern monopolist capitalism in the period of crisis and of extreme class-war." Dutt fiercely criticizes engaging with fascist "theory" and ideology on its face value and finds causes of fascism in the reality of world economic crisis of 1914 and 1929. According to Dutt, capitalist crisis created a situation, where capitalism could no longer justify itself on rational grounds and the irrationality of fascism was a consciously used tool to direct people into a movement popular in form, but anti-popular in content that serves to destroy the working class revolution and chain the workers to the capitalist state while claiming to be "anticapitalist". In Dutt's analysis, fascism, like liberal democracy or social-democracy is just another form of bourgeois dictatorship, a tool of the bourgeoisie that is used when capitalist crisis is extremely severe and all other methods of gathering working-class support for capitalism have failed. In the book Dutt also directs a lot of attention towards post-war social-democracy, which he blames for betraying the workers' revolution and directly helping the advance of fascism by disorganising the working class from the inside and preventing any militant action: "Fascism operates primarily by coercion alongside of deception; Social Democracy operates primarily by deception, alongside of coercion."

After Stalin's death, Palme Dutt's reaction to Nikita Khrushchev's Secret Speech played down its significance, with Dutt arguing that Stalin's "sun" unsurprisingly contained some "spots". A hardliner in the party, he disagreed with its criticisms of the Soviet invasion of Czechoslovakia in 1968 and opposed its increasingly Eurocommunist line in the 1970s. He retired from his party positions but remained a member until his death in 1974. According to the historian Geoff Andrews, the Communist Party of the Soviet Union was still paying the CPGB around £15,000 a year "for pensions" into the 1970s, recipients of which "included Rajani Palme Dutt".

The Labour History Archive and Study Centre at the People's History Museum in Manchester has Palme Dutt's papers in its collection, spanning from 1908 to 1971.

== India visit ==
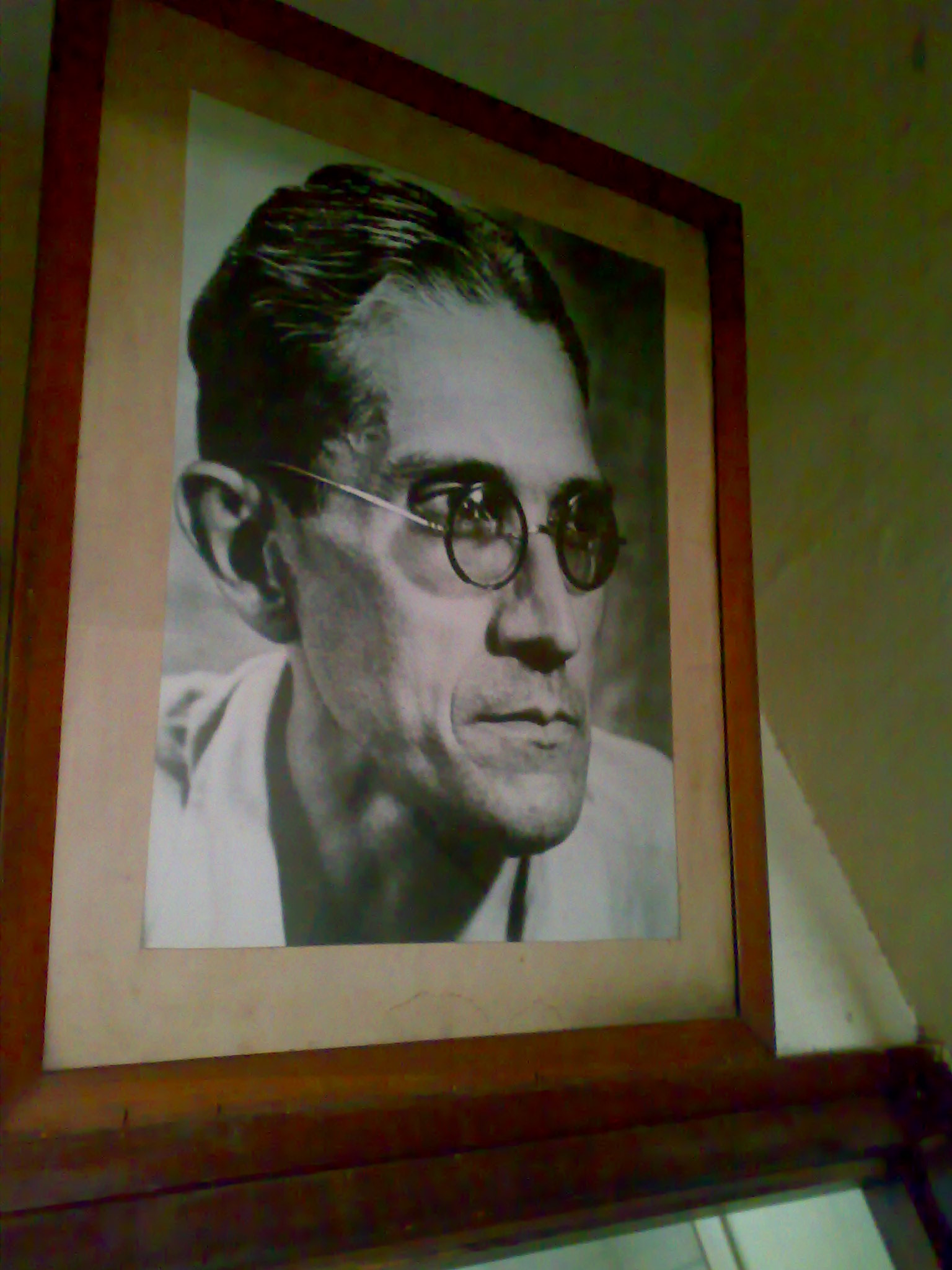
RPD Portrait at PPH, Jhandewalan, Delhi

In 1946 the British Indian Government permitted RPD to visit his father's country for the first time since 1921, this time as a special correspondent for the Daily Worker. The visit lasted four months, during which he spoke at several rallies in different cities of India, all organised by the Communist Party of India. During this time he also interacted with many of that Party's workers, along with senior leaders including PC Joshi. During this visit he also met several important leaders of India including Mahatma Gandhi, Jawaharlal Nehru, Vallabhbhai Patel, Mohammad Ali Jinnah and Stafford Cripps. He was also invited by newly-built All India Radio for a broadcast. His visit had such a profound effect upon Indian Communists that when they established the headquarters of their “People’s Publishing House (PPH)” in Jhandewalan, Delhi, between 1956 and 1958 they named the building the “R. Palme Dutt Bhawan” (Bhawan meaning Building) after RPD. On that building's second floor stairwell hung a portrait of RPD taken during his 1946 visit to India, remaining there until very recently and now possibly hanging in the Party's headquarters at Ajoy Bhawan.

== Works ==
- 1920: The Sabotage of Europe
- 1920: The Two Internationals
- 1921: Back to Plotinus, Review of Shaw's Back to Methusela: A Metaphysical Pentateuch
- 1921: Psycho-Analysing the Bolshevik, Review of Kolnai's Psycho-analysis and Sociology
- 1922: The End of Gandhi
- 1923: The British Empire
- 1923: The Issue in Europe
- 1925: Empire Socialism (pamphlet)
- 1926: The Meaning of the General Strike (pamphlet)
- 1926: Trotsky and His English Critics
- 1928: Indian Awakening
- 1931: India
- 1931: Capitalism or Socialism in Britain? (pamphlet)
- 1933: Democracy and Fascism (pamphlet)
- 1933: A Note on the Falsification of Engels' Preface to "Marx’s 'Class Struggles in France"
- 1934: Fascism and Social Revolution
- 1935: The Question of Fascism and Capitalist Decay
- 1935: British Policy and Nazi Germany
- 1935: The British-German Alliance in the Open
- 1935: For a united Communist Party : an appeal to I.L.P'ers and to all revolutionary workers
- 1936: In Memory of Shapurji Saklatvala
- 1936: Anti-Imperialist People's Front in India, written with Ben Bradley
- 1936: Left Nationalism in India
- Spain Organises for Victory: The Policy of the Communist Party of Spain.: On the Eve of the Indian National Congress, with Harry Pollitt and Ben Bradley
- 1936: "World Politics, 1918-1936"
- 1938: Review of Marx & Engels on the U.S. Civil War
- 1939: Why this War? (pamphlet)
- 1940: Twentieth Anniversary of the Communist Party of Great Britain
- 1940: India Today
- 1947: Declaration on Palestine, at the Empire Communist Parties Conference, London on 26 February to 3 March 1947
- 1949: Introductory Report on Election Programme
- 1953: Stalin and the Future
- 1953: The crisis of Britain and the British Empire (new and revised edition 1957)
- 1955: India Today and Tomorrow
- 1963: Problems of Contemporary History
- 1964: The Internationale
- 1967: Whither China?

== Footnotes ==
Media offices
| Preceded by New publication Thomas A. Jackson as editor of The Communist | Editor of Workers' Weekly; 1923–1924 | Succeeded by J. R. Campbell |
| Preceded by Idris Cox | Editor of the Daily Worker; 1936–1938 | Succeeded by Dave Springhall |
Party political offices
| Preceded by Harry Pollitt | Acting General Secretary of the Communist Party of Great Britain; 1939–1941 | Succeeded by Harry Pollitt |
