= William Rust (journalist) =

British newspaper editor

William Charles Rust
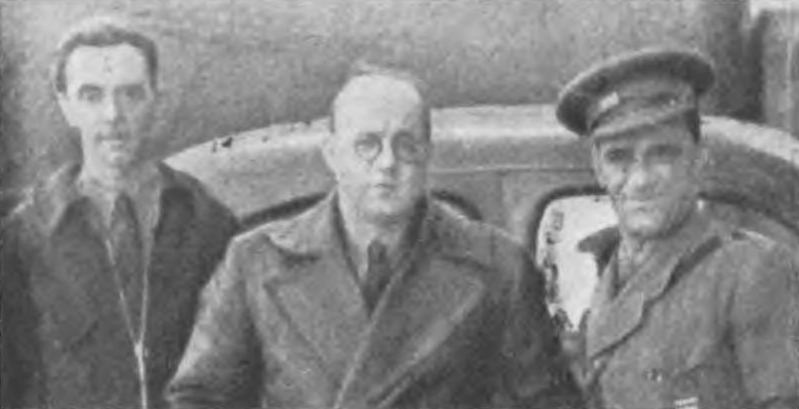
- Commissar John Mahon (left) and Bill Rust (center) with Lieutenant Colonel Vladimir Ćopić, 1937
- Born: 24 April 1903; Camberwell, London, England
- Died: 3 February 1949 (aged 45); London, England
- Occupations: Journalist, war correspondent, comintern worker, newspaper editor
- Employer: Daily Worker
- Political party: Communist Party of Great Britain (CPGB)
- Spouses: Kathleen O'Donoghue; Tamara Kravetz
- Children: 1

William Charles Rust (24 April 1903 – 3 February 1949) was a British newspaper editor and communist activist.

== Biography ==
Born in Camberwell, Rust began working at Hulton's Press Agency before moving to the Workers Dreadnought newspaper produced by Sylvia Pankhurst. He joined the Communist Party of Great Britain (CPGB) shortly after its foundation, and in 1923 he joined its executive, as a representative of the Young Communist League. In July 1924 he attended the Fifth Congress of the Communist International in Moscow.

In 1925, Rust was one of 12 members of the Communist Party convicted at the Old Bailey under the Incitement to Mutiny Act 1797, and was given 12 months' imprisonment. His wife Kathleen gave birth to their daughter Rosa the same year.

Between 1928 and 1930 Rust worked for Comintern in Moscow, moving there with his family. He returned in 1930, becoming the first editor of the party's newspaper, the Daily Worker. He was in the post for two years, before becoming the CPGB's representative in Moscow, then after a period as a party organiser in Lancashire, he became the Daily Worker's correspondent with the International Brigades in the Spanish Civil War.

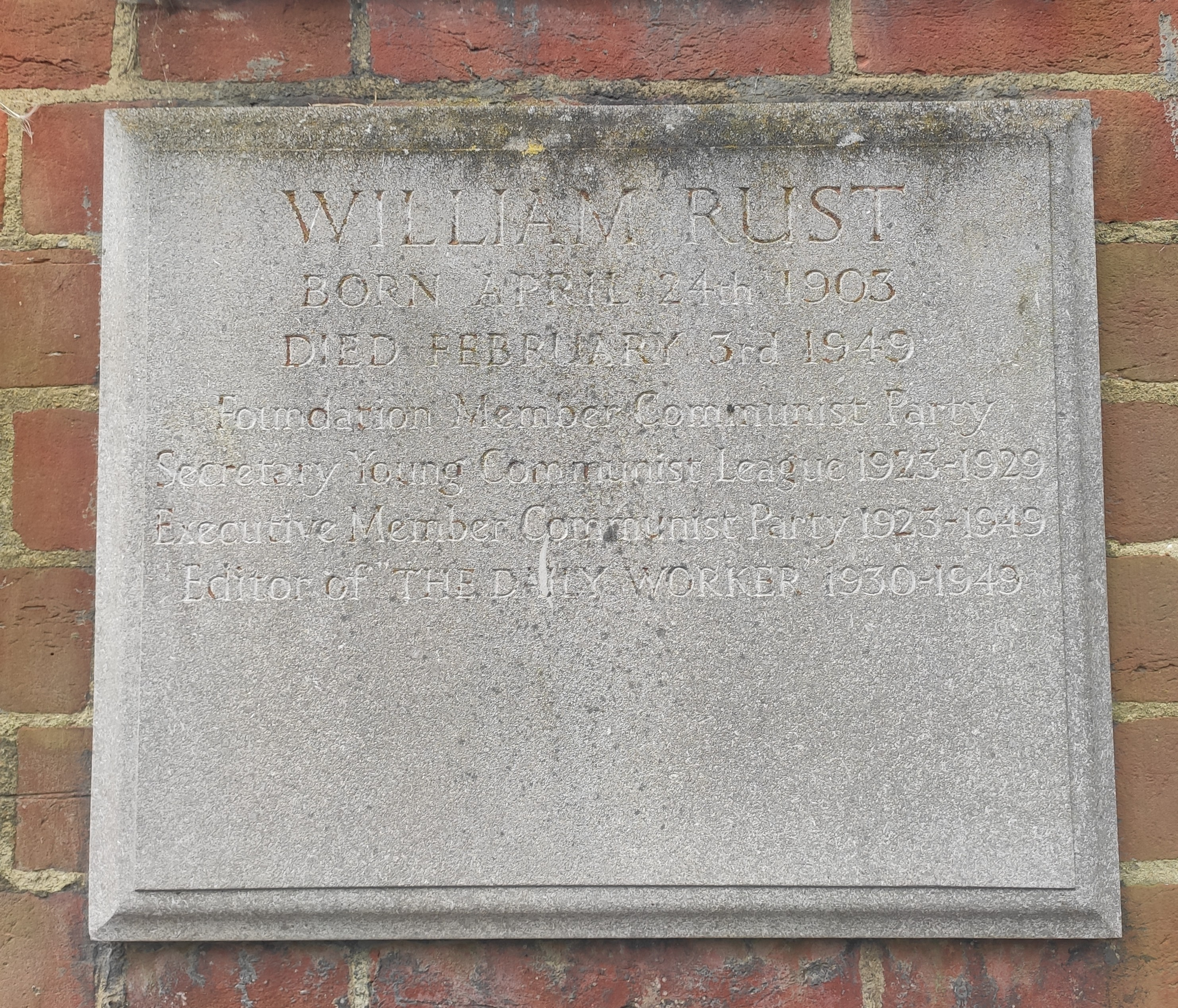
Plaque dedicated to Rust at Golders Green Crematorium

Rust returned as editor of the Daily Worker in 1939, remaining in the post until his death from a heart attack in 1949, aged 45. He was cremated at Golders Green Crematorium.

Rust's first wife Kathleen had stayed on in the Soviet Union following their estrangement, returning later in the 1930s. Their daughter Rosa remained until the 1940s, was caught up in the 1941 ethnic cleansing of the Volga Germans, then spent time in forced labour camps before being allowed to return to Britain in 1943. Rust was married a second time to Tamara Kravetz, who, following his death, was remarried, in 1954, to Wogan Philipps, who acceded to his father's peerage as 2nd Baron Milford in 1962 and became the only Communist to sit in the House of Lords.

== Footnotes ==
Party political offices
Preceded by New position	Secretary of the Young Communist League; 1921–29?	Succeeded by Wally Tapsell
Media offices
Preceded by New position	Editor of the Daily Worker; 1930–32	Succeeded by Jimmy Shields
Preceded by John Ross Campbell	Editor of the Daily Worker; 1939–49	Succeeded by John Ross Campbell
