= Workers' Weekly (UK) =

British political newspaper

The Workers' Weekly was the official newspaper of the Communist Party of Great Britain, established in February 1923. The publication was succeeded by Workers' Life in January 1927 following a successful libel action against the paper. This was in turn replaced by The Daily Worker on the first day of January 1930.

== History ==
=== Forerunners ===
Workers' Weekly had its origins in the earlier press of the British revolutionary socialist movement. With the founding of the Communist Party of Great Britain (CPGB) in August 1920, the constituent parties such as the British Socialist Party (BSP) and the Workers' Socialist Federation (WSF) ceased to exist as did the BSP's paper weekly newspaper, The Call. A new publication was established for the new political party called The Communist.

The Communist began on 5 August 1920, just four days after the completion of the conference (the Congress of London) which founded the CPGB. The publication continued without interruption until its 131st issue, dated 3 February 1923. The paper was in many ways a direct continuation of The Call, retaining the same look and style, the same editor, and even continuing the serialization of articles begun in the earlier publication.

The first editor was Fred Willis, former editor of the BSP's weekly, assisted by Raymond Postgate. The paper maintained a circulation of between 8,000 and 9,000 during 1920, after which time the circulation began to rise rapidly due to improvements in the publication's design. Francis Meynell took over as editor around the first of 1921 and by 5 February 1921, circulation stood at 25,000. Sales continued to rise throughout the year, touching the 60,000 mark at the time of the raid on party offices in May 1921.

Towards the end of April 1921, Member of Parliament J. H. Thomas successfully sued The Communist for libel, naming its editors, printer, and publisher in the action. The pressure of this legal action and subsequent raid of party offices by the police had the effect of making production of the paper extraordinarily difficult. The Independent Labour Party's printing house abruptly stopped production of an issue of the paper in midstream after coming to an agreement with the Director of Public Prosecutions not to produce any more Communist material.

In July 1921, Postgate took over for Meynell as editor of The Communist. He continued in that role until giving way in favour of T.A."Tommy" Jackson in May 1922.

By the autumn of 1922, the print run of The Communist had declined to around the 20,000 mark, with actual sales in the vicinity of just 8,000.

It was clear to Communist Party leaders that a drastic makeover for the publication was due.

=== Establishment of Workers' Weekly ===
In the spring of 1923, the Communist Party of Great Britain felt itself at low ebb. Leading theoretician Andrew Rothstein minced no words in an article in the party's monthly theoretical magazine:

"What is the position of our party today? Despite the terrifying pictures drawn by the Morning Post and the British Empire Union, we in the party know to our cost, and do not conceal it...that our party numbers only some thousands of members, of whom perhaps half are "active," i.e., propagandists, agitators, organizers, literature-sellers, writers, etc. The party has not a great many more members than those organisations which were represented at the first and second unity congresses in August 1920 and January 1921.... We have some members active in the trade unions, less in the trades councils, and very few in the workshops.... The masses do not attend branch meetings. We shall find them where they are to be found daily — at the 'point of production': the workshop, pit, depot, stores, or office....

"How can we extend our influence in the workshops? By means of the Workers' Weekly: by making it interesting to those in the workshops; by reflecting in it the daily life of the workshops; by building it up, in short, around letters from the workships, because the constitute the first link in the chain, the first like that we must take hold of and hold on to with all our might, knowing that only in that way we shall arrive at what we desire."

The governing Executive Committee of the CPGB had decided to replace The Communist with a new publication called the Workers' Weekly. The first issue of the new paper was dated 10 February 1923. The change of name was to reflect a parallel change in the publication's approach, emphasizing the daily life and shop concerns of the working class as well as noteworthy events in the Labour Movement. In his article in the monthly theoretical magazine of the CPGB announcing the switch, Andrew Rothstein declared that the revamped publication was to mark a move away from being "a weekly journal for the orthodox Communist household" and towards becoming "a live reporter and interpreter of the working class life and struggle."

R. Palme Dutt was editor of the revamped publication. Following the Comintern's emphasis of the day, the new paper attached particular importance to letters from worker-correspondents, publishing over 2,500 letters and reports submitted from the grassroots in its first year.

On 17 February 1923 the paper explicitly stated the change in direction:

"We want a paper made by the workers for the workers. Our news is working class news supplied by the workers on the spot. It may not be very wonderful news yet, but you can improve that for us by seeing that we get the news that you won't get in other papers. It is the news of the workers."

Circulation once again began to rise. The first issue of The Workers' Weekly had a press run of 19,000 and sold out within 24 hours of publication. By the end of March, the press run had increased considerably, to over 50,000 copies.

=== Dissolution ===
Circulation peaked at 80,000 copies in August 1926, in the aftermath of the 1926 General Strike. Trouble lay ahead, however, as at the end of January 1927 a successful legal action for libel forced the publication into bankruptcy. A new party paper was established at that time called Workers' Life, a publication which attained a circulation of 60,000 copies a week by that summer.

In London on 1 January 1930, under a banner headline reading "Workers of the World, Unite," a new daily newspaper of the Communist Party of Great Britain called The Daily Worker was born. It took the same name as the American Communist daily established in 1923. The editor of the paper was a 26-year-old named William Rust, whose editorial experience had included a brief stint at the helm of the paper of the Young Communist League.

With the appearance of the Daily Worker, its less frequent forerunner, The Workers' Weekly, ceased publication.

== See also ==
- Daily Worker/Morning Star
