= Communist Party of Great Britain election results =

UK political party election results

This article lists the Communist Party of Great Britain's election results in UK parliamentary elections.

== Summary of general election performance ==
Average vote share of Communist Party of GB candidates at each General Election

Year	Number of Candidates	Total votes	Average voters per candidate	Percentage of vote	Saved deposits	Change (percentage points)	Number of MPs
1922	5	30,684	6,137	0.2	3	N/A	1
1923	4	39,448	9,862	0.2	4	0.0	0
1924	8	55,346	6,918	0.3	7	+0.1	1
1929	25	50,634	2,205	0.2	4	-0.1	0
1931	26	74,824	2,878	0.3	5	+0.1	0
1935	2	27,177	13,589	0.1	2	−0.2	1
1945	21	102,780	4,894	0.4	9	+0.3	2
1950	100	91,765	918	0.3	3	−0.1	0
1951	10	21,640	2,164	0.1	0	−0.2	0
1955	17	33,144	1,950	0.1	2	0.0	0
1959	18	30,896	1,716	0.1	1	0.0	0
1964	36	46,442	1,290	0.2	0	+0.1	0
1966	57	62,092	1,089	0.2	0	0.0	0
1970	57	37,970	655	0.1	0	−0.1	0
1974 February	44	32,743	744	0.1	1	0.0	0
1974 October	29	17,426	601	0.1	0	0.0	0
1979	38	16,858	444	0.1	0	0.0	0
1983	35	11,606	332	0.0	0	−0.1	0
1987	19	6,078	320	0.0	0	−0.1	0

== Election results ==
=== By-elections, 1921–22 ===
By-election	Candidate	Votes	%	Position
1921 Caerphilly by-election	Bob Stewart	2,592	10.3	3

=== 1922 general election ===
Constituency	Candidate	Votes	%	Position
Bethnal Green North East	Walter Windsor	5,659	35.3	2
Dundee	Willie Gallacher	5,906	5.0	6
Greenock	Alec Geddes	9,776	34.1	2
Motherwell	Walton Newbold	8,262	33.3	1

This list does not include Shapurji Saklatvala, a member of the party who was elected for the Labour Party, nor Joe Vaughan who also stood for the Labour Party.

=== 1923 general election ===
Constituency	Candidate	Votes	%	Position
Dundee	Willie Gallacher	10,380	10.1	5
Glasgow Kelvingrove	Aitken Ferguson	10,021	39.0	2
Greenock	Alec Geddes	10,335	38.8	2
Motherwell	Walton Newbold	8,712	37.4	2

This list does not include William Paul, Morgan Philips Price, Shapurji Saklatvala, Joe Vaughan or Ellen Wilkinson, party members who stood for the Labour Party.

=== 1924 general election ===
Constituency	Candidate	Votes	%	Position
Battersea North	Shapurji Saklatvala	15,096	50.9	1
Bethnal Green South West	Joe Vaughan	6,024	40.9	2
Birmingham West	Robert Dunstan	7,158	32.1	2
Dundee	Bob Stewart	8,340	6.7	5
Greenock	Alec Geddes	7,590	29.0	2
Manchester Rusholme	William Paul	5,328	20.2	3
Nottingham East	Tom Mann	2,606	10.8	3
Streatham	Alfred Wall	3,204	13.8	3

=== By-elections, 1924–29 ===
By-election	Candidate	Votes	%	Position
1928 Aberdeen North by-election	Aitken Ferguson	2,618	12.9	3

=== 1929 general election ===
Constituency	Candidate	Votes	%	Position
Aberdeen North	Aitken Ferguson	1,686	5.8	3
Battersea North	Shapurji Saklatvala	6,554	18.6	3
Bethnal Green South West	Robert Dunstan	1,368	7.7	3
Bothwell	Helen Crawfurd	1,677	5.5	3
Caerphilly	Jock Wilson	829	2.2	4
Dundee	Bob Stewart	6,160	3.6	5
Dunfermline Burghs	Jack Leckie	1,712	6.5	3
Glasgow St Rollox	George Middleton	613	1.9	3
Greenock	Alec Geddes	7,005	25.1	3
Hackney South	J. T. Murphy	331	1.1	4
Hamilton	Frank Moore	395	1.6	3
Limehouse	Walter Tapsell	245	1.0	4
Manchester Platting	Joseph Vaughan	401	1.0	3
Mansfield	Rose Smith	533	1.1	4
Motherwell	Isabel Brown	984	3.4	4
Ogmore	John Ross Campbell	1,525	3.8	4
Rhondda East	Arthur Horner	5,789	15.2	3
Rutherglen	Alex Moffat	842	2.5	4
Seaham	Harry Pollitt	1,431	2.9	4
Sheffield Attercliffe	George Fletcher	1,731	5.5	4
Spen Valley	Shaukat Usmani	242	0.6	3
Tottenham South	Henry Sara	490	1.5	4
Wallsend	Wal Hannington	744	1.8	4
West Fife	Willie Gallacher	6,040	20.5	2
Wigan	Frank Bright	1,307	2.8	3

=== By-elections, 1929–31 ===
By-election	Candidate	Votes	%	Position
1929 Leeds South East by-election	Bill Brain	512	4.2	2
1929 Kilmarnock by-election	Isabel Brown	1,448	4.4	3
1930 Sheffield Brightside by-election	J. T. Murphy	1,084	4.4	4
1930 Glasgow Shettleston by-election	Shapurji Saklatvala	1,459	5.8	4
1930 Shipley by-election	Willie Gallacher	701	1.7	4
1930 Whitechapel and St Georges by-election	Harry Pollitt	2,106	9.6	4
1931 Ogmore by-election	John Ross Campbell	5,219	21.2	2

=== 1931 general election ===
Constituency	Candidate	Votes	%	Position
Aberdeen North	Helen Crawfurd	3,980	11.1	3
Battersea North	Shapurji Saklatvala	3,021	8.9	3
Bethnal Green South West	Joe Vaughan	2,970	17.4	3
Bermondsey West	Wal Hannington	873	4.2	3
Birmingham Duddeston	Bernard Moore	327	1.2	3
Bothwell	Barney McCourt	1,677	6.5	3
Burnley	Jim Rushton	512	0.8	3
Dundee	Bob Stewart	10,264	5.8	5
Edinburgh Central	Fred Douglas	1,319	4.5	3
Glasgow Gorbals	Harry McShane	2,626	7.9	3
Glasgow Springburn	A. Haines	1,997	5.8	3
Gorton	Chris Flanagan	1,000	2.6	3
Greenock	Aitken Ferguson	6,440	18.2	3
Greenwich	Kath Duncan	2,024	4.5	3
Hammersmith North	Ted Bramley	697	2.2	3
Liverpool Scotland	Leo McGree	1,544	5.6	3
Ogmore	John Ross Campbell	3,099	8.2	3
Rhondda East	Arthur Horner	10,359	31.9	2
Rhondda West	John Leigh Davies	4,296	15.7	2
St Pancras North	William Shepherd	456	1.3	3
St Pancras South East	Shaukat Usmani	332	1.2	3
Seaham	George Lumley	677	1.3	3
Sheffield Attercliffe	George Fletcher	2,790	8.5	3
Sheffield Brightside	J. T. Murphy	1,571	4.1	3
West Fife	Willie Gallacher	6,829	22.1	3
Whitechapel and St Georges	Harry Pollitt	2,658	11.2	3

=== By-elections, 1931–35 ===
By-election	Candidate	Votes	%	Position
1932 Dunbartonshire by-election	Hughie McIntyre	2,870	7.5	4
1933 Rhondda East by-election	Arthur Horner	11,228	33.8	2
1933 Clay Cross by-election	Harry Pollitt	3,434	10.8	3
1933 Skipton by-election	James Rushton	704	1.7	4
1934 Hammersmith North by-election	Ted Bramley	614	2.4	3
1934 Merthyr by-election	Wal Hannington	3,409	9.5	4

=== 1935 general election ===
Constituency	Candidate	Votes	%	Position
Rhondda East	Harry Pollitt	13,655	38.2	2
West Fife	Willie Gallacher	13,462	37.4	1

=== By-elections, 1935–45 ===
By-election	Candidate	Votes	%	Position
1939 Stretford by-election	Eric Gower	1,514	5.1	3
1940 Silvertown by-election	Harry Pollitt	966	6.2	2
1940 Bow and Bromley by-election	Isabel Brown	506	4.2	2
1941 Dunbartonshire by-election	Malcolm MacEwen	3,862	15.0	2

=== 1945 general election ===
Constituency	Candidate	Votes	%	Position
Abingdon	John Clement Dix Dunman	1,668	4.4	4
Birmingham Handsworth	Jessie Eden	1,390	3.4	5
Birmingham Sparkbrook	Rajani Palme Dutt	1,853	7.6	3
Coventry East	Bill Alexander	3,986	7.0	3
Glasgow Central	Bob Cooney	2,709	12.7	3
Glasgow Shettleston	Peter Kerrigan	4,122	12.3	4
Greenock	John Ross Campbell	5,900	17.2	3
Hackney South	William Rust	4,891	24.2	3
Harrow East	Gladys Driver	3,493	5.9	4
Hornsey	George John Jones	10,058	21.5	3
Kirkcaldy Burghs	John McArthur	2,898	8.5	4
Mile End	Phil Piratin	5,075	47.6	1
Preston	Pat J. Devine	5,168	3.8	6
Rhondda East	Harry Pollitt	15,761	45.5	2
Rossendale	Bill Whittaker	1,663	4.6	4
Sevenoaks	Ken Thompson	676	1.6	4
Sheffield Brightside	Howard Hill	4,115	13.0	3
Sheffield Hallam	Gordon Herbert Cree	2,253	6.7	4
Sunderland	Tommy Richardson	4,501	3.3	5
West Fife	Willie Gallacher	17,636	42.2	1
Westminster Abbey	Bill Carritt	2,964	17.6	3

=== By-elections, 1945–50 ===
By-election	Candidate	Votes	%	Position
1948 Wigan by-election	Thomas Rowlandson	1,647	3.4	3
1948 Glasgow Gorbals by-election	Peter Kerrigan	4,233	16.9	3
1949 St Pancras North by-election	John Mahon	854	3.0	3

=== 1950 general election ===
Constituency	Candidate	Votes	%	Position
Aberdare	Alistair Wilson	1,382	3.1	4
Aberdeen North	Bob Cooney	1,391	2.7	4
Abingdon	John Clement Dix Dunman	396	0.9	4
Acton	Albert F. Papworth	663	1.5	4
Ashton-under-Lyne	H. H. Blackwell	459	1.1	3
Battersea North	John Mahon	655	1.8	4
Bedford	Betty Lynette Matthews	207	0.5	4
Bethnal Green	G. Midwater	610	1.9	4
Bexley	Charles Job	481	0.9	4
Birkenhead	S. Coulthard	971	1.8	4
Birmingham Northfield	Dick Etheridge	479	1.0	4
Birmingham Sparkbrook	Jim Crump	355	0.9	3
Birmingham Yardley	J. Falconer	347	0.8	4
Bradford East	H. Green	543	1.2	4
Brentford and Chiswick	Joseph Henry Parker	401	1.0	4
Bristol South East	Jack F. Webb	524	1.1	4
Burnley	Bill Whittaker	526	1.0	3
Chesterfield	Bas Barker	554	1.0	4
Cirencester and Tewkesbury	Wogan Philipps	423	0.9	4
Cities of London and Westminster	Bill Carritt	888	1.7	4
Clapham	G. M. Draper	619	1.3	4
Coventry East	Bill Alexander	487	1.0	4
Croydon West	Bob Jarvie	336	0.7	4
Dagenham	George Bridges	883	1.5	4
Deptford	Les Stannard	562	1.3	4
Don Valley	Sammy Taylor	1,007	1.9	3
Dover	Bob Morrison	474	0.9	4
Dundee East	Dave Bowman	1,093	2.2	3
East Ham South	E. Thomas	401	1.1	4
Edinburgh Central	Donald Renton	646	1.9	4
Eton and Slough	P. L. N. Smith	614	1.5	4
Eye	Lee Chadwick	277	0.6	4
Fulham East	R. Ellesmere	399	1.1	4
Glasgow Bridgeton	D. Kelly	858	2.5	4
Glasgow Gorbals	Peter Kerrigan	2,426	5.9	3
Glasgow Govan	William Lauchlan	1,547	3.7	4
Glasgow Scotstoun	Bob McIlhone	1,088	2.6	4
Glasgow Shettleston	Malcolm MacEwen	1,678	4.1	3
Glasgow Springburn	Robert F. Horne	1,764	4.1	4
Greenock	John Ross Campbell	1,228	3.0	4
Hackney South	John R. Betteridge	2,199	3.8	4
Hampstead	R. Gore	1,603	2.8	4
Harrow East	Bill Seaman	633	1.2	4
Hayes and Harlington	Frank Foster	593	1.6	4
Hendon North	Marjorie Pollitt	918	2.0	4
Hornsey	George John Jones	1,191	1.9	4
Huyton	Leo McGree	387	0.9	4
Ilford South	Dave Kelly	913	1.6	4
Islington South West	Alfred Bender	834	1.8	4
Kensington North	M. J. Eyre	551	1.3	4
Kettering	L. P. O'Connor	368	0.6	4
Kilmarnock	Isabel Brown	860	2.2	4
Leeds North East	Bert Ramelson	612	1.6	4
Leicester North East	Frederick C. Westacott	327	0.7	4
Lewisham South	J. W. Jones	635	1.3	4
Liverpool Scotland	Jack Coward	615	1.4	3
Manchester Blackley	Ben Ainley	562	1.1	4
Manchester Gorton	Syd Abbott	873	1.7	4
Manchester Wythenshawe	Frances Dean	588	1.3	4
Mansfield	Les Ellis	482	0.9	4
Middlesbrough East	N. Levy	367	0.8	4
Motherwell	R. Henderson	1,007	2.4	4
Neath	Alun Thomas	1,584	3.5	4
Newcastle-upon-Tyne East	R. McNair	492	0.9	3
Nottingham North West	Arthur West	719	1.5	4
Ogmore	Mavis Llewellyn	1,691	3.5	3
Oldham West	W. Mawdsley	438	0.9	4
Oxford	Ernest Keeling	494	0.8	4
Paddington North	Daniel Cohen	417	1.2	4
Peckham	T. Gibson	886	1.8	4
Poplar	H. Watson	540	1.4	4
Portsmouth West	George Swanton	251	0.5	3
Preston North	P. J. Devine	366	0.8	4
Rhondda East	Harry Pollitt	4,463	12.7	2
St Pancras North	T. Aherne	967	1.9	4
Sheffield Brightside	Howard Hill	1,081	2.3	3
Sheffield Hillsborough	M. Bennett	759	1.5	3
Sheffield Park	Arthur Fullard	909	2.0	3
Shipley	L. T. Robb	237	0.6	4
Southall	J. A. Purton	839	1.7	4
South Shields	F. O. Smith	415	0.7	4
Southwark	Joe Bent	668	1.3	4
Stalybridge and Hyde	D. P. Herrick	389	0.8	4
Stepney	Phil Piratin	5,991	12.5	3
Stirling and Falkirk	G. McAlister	801	1.8	4
Swindon	Ike Gradwell	295	0.7	4
Totnes	Edwin Tapscott	423	0.8	4
Tottenham	G. Cross	802	1.5	4
Vauxhall	Margot Heinemann	508	1.3	4
Warrington	James Joseph Grady	496	1.1	4
Wembley South	N. Gill	430	1.0	4
West Dunbartonshire	Finlay Hart	1,198	2.9	3
West Fife	Willie Gallacher	9,301	21.6	3
West Ham South	W. Norris	730	1.6	4
West Lothian	J. Borrowman	664	1.5	4
Wigan	Thomas Rowlandson	1,243	2.4	4
Willesden West	David Michaelson	938	1.7	4
Woodford	William George Philip Brooks	827	1.3	4
Woolwich East	Rajani Palme Dutt	601	1.4	4
Wycombe	Elizabeth Rose Leigh	199	0.4	4

=== By-elections, 1950–51 ===
By-election	Candidate	Votes	%	Position
1950 Sheffield Neepsend by-election	Bill Moore	729	2.4	3

=== 1951 general election ===
Constituency	Candidate	Votes	%	Position
Dundee West	Dave Bowman	1,508	2.7	3
East Dunbartonshire	Arnold Henderson	2,158	4.1	3
Glasgow Gorbals	Peter Kerrigan	2,553	6.2	3
Hackney South	John Betteridge	1,744	3.0	3
Lewisham South	John Mahon	578	1.2	3
Rhondda East	Idris Cox	2,948	8.6	3
Sheffield Brightside	Howard Hill	1,116	2.5	3
Stepney	Ted Bramley	3,436	7.3	3
West Fife	William Lauchlan	4,728	10.5	3
Woodford	John Ross Campbell	871	1.3	3

=== By-elections, 1951–55 ===
By-election	Candidate	Votes	%	Position
1954 Motherwell by-election	John Gollan	1,457	4.3	3

=== 1955 general election ===
Constituency	Candidate	Votes	%	Position
Birmingham Perry Barr	Bert Pearce	928	2.5	3
Dundee West	Dave Bowman	1,335	2.6	3
East Dunbartonshire	Arnold Henderson	2,448	4.9	3
Glasgow Gorbals	Peter Kerrigan	2,491	6.8	3
Glasgow Springburn	Finlay Hart	1,532	5.5	3
Hackney North and Stoke Newington	Aubrey Morris	1,525	3.4	4
Hackney Central	John Betteridge	1,530	3.5	3
Hayes and Harlington	Frank Foster	886	2.6	3
Hornsey	George John Jones	1,442	2.6	3
Nottingham North	John Peck	916	1.9	3
Rhondda East	Annie Powell	4,544	15.1	2
St Pancras North	Jock Nicolson	1,303	3.0	3
Sheffield Brightside	Howard Hill	1,461	3.5	3
Southwark	Joe Bent	959	2.4	3
Stepney	Solly Kaye	2,888	7.6	3
West Fife	William Lauchlan	4,728	10.5	3
Wigan	Thomas Rowlandson	1,567	3.4	3

=== By-elections, 1955–59 ===
By-election	Candidate	Votes	%	Position
1958 Wigan by-election	Mick Weaver	972	2.5	3

=== 1959 general election ===
Constituency	Candidate	Votes	%	Position
Birmingham Perry Barr	Bert Pearce	424	1.1	4
Dundee West	Dave Bowman	1,087	2.1	3
East Dunbartonshire	Arnold Henderson	2,200	4.0	3
Glasgow Gorbals	Peter Kerrigan	1,932	5.9	3
Glasgow Govan	Gordon McLennan	1,869	4.9	4
Glasgow Springburn	Finlay Hart	1,235	4.5	3
Hayes and Harlington	Frank Foster	527	1.4	4
Hornsey	George John Jones	1,107	2.0	4
Neath	Jim David	1,962	4.6	3
Nottingham North	John Peck	1,331	2.6	4
Rhondda East	Annie Powell	4,580	14.5	2
St Pancras North	Jock Nicolson	1,230	3.0	4
Sheffield Brightside	Howard Hill	1,373	3.3	3
Southwark	Joe Bent	1,395	3.6	3
Stepney	Solly Kaye	2,548	6.7	3
West Fife	William Lauchlan	3,828	8.4	4
Wigan	Mick Weaver	945	2.0	3
Willesden West	Les Burt	1,324	3.0	3

=== By-elections, 1959–64 ===
By-election	Candidate	Votes	%	Position
1962 West Lothian by-election	Gordon McLennan	1,511	3.6	5
1963 Swansea East by-election	Bert Pearce	773	2.5	6
1963 Leeds South by-election	Bert Ramelson	670	2.2	4
1963 Luton by-election	Tony Chater	490	1.1	4
1963 Dundee West by-election	Dave Bowman	1,170	2.6	4
1963 Manchester Openshaw by-election	Eddie Marsden	1,185	4.9	3

=== 1964 general election ===
Constituency	Candidate	Votes	%	Position
Aberavon	Julian Tudor Hart	1,260	2.7	4
Battersea North	Gladys Easton	471	2.0	4
Birmingham Small Heath	George Jelf	926	3.3	3
Coventry East	Harry Bourne	1,138	1.9	3
Dagenham	Kevin Halpin	1,070	2.1	4
Dundee West	Dave Bowman	1,228	2.4	3
East Dunbartonshire	Jimmy Reid	1,171	2.0	3
Glasgow Gorbals	Margaret Hunter	1,339	5.6	3
Glasgow Govan	Gordon McLennan	1,378	4.4	3
Glasgow Springburn	Neil McLellan	950	3.7	4
Goole	William Carr	1,165	2.8	3
Hayes and Harlington	Frank Stanley	873	2.6	3
Hornsey	Max Morris	1,258	2.6	4
Islington South West	John Moss	1,377	5.1	3
Kinross and Western Perthshire	C. M. Grieve	127	0.5	4
Leeds South	Bert Ramelson	928	2.6	3
Liverpool Scotland	Tom Cassin	725	2.8	3
Llanelli	Bob Hitchon	1,061	2.2	5
Luton	Tony Chater	567	1.2	3
Manchester Openshaw	Eddie Marsden	1,947	5.1	3
Mitcham	Sid French	657	1.2	4
Motherwell	James Sneddon	1,565	4.0	3
Neath	Jim David	2,432	6.0	3
Newcastle-upon-Tyne Central	Tom Welch	532	1.8	3
Nottingham North	John Peck	1,579	3.1	3
Pontypool	Eddie Jones	1,329	3.6	3
Rhondda East	Annie Powell	3,385	11.8	2
St Pancras North	Jock Nicolson	1,140	3.4	4
Sheffield Brightside	Howard Hill	1,356	3.5	3
Southwark	Joe Bent	1,599	4.9	3
Stepney	Solly Kaye	2,454	7.9	3
Swindon	Ike Gradwell	944	2.1	3
West Fife	William Lauchlan	3,273	7.5	3
West Lothian	Irene Swan	610	1.2	4
Wigan	Mick Weaver	988	2.4	3
Willesden West	Les Burt	1,130	3.0	3

=== 1966 general election ===
Constituency	Candidate	Votes	%	Position
Aberavon	Julian Tudor Hart	1,620	3.6	3
Aberdare	Alistair Wilson	2,305	6.4	4
Aberdeen North	Margaret Rose	719	1.7	4
Battersea North	Gladys Easton	650	3.0	3
Birkenhead	Barry Williams	604	1.5	3
Birmingham Northfield	Derek Robinson	1,029	1.6	3
Birmingham Small Heath	George Jelf	477	1.8	3
Birmingham Stechford	Bill Dunn	998	2.6	3
Bothwell	Thomas Woods	1,209	2.7	3
Bristol North West	Brian Underwood	595	1.2	3
Coventry East	Harry Bourne	1,368	2.3	4
Dagenham	George Wake	1,373	2.9	3
Dundee West	Dave Bowman	1,217	2.5	4
East Dunbartonshire	Jimmy Reid	1,548	2.5	4
Eccles	Michael Bennett	1,239	3.0	3
Edinburgh Leith	Honor Arundel	279	1.0	3
Erith and Crayford	Laurie Smith	556	1.3	4
Fulham	Peter Robson	256	0.7	4
Glasgow Gorbals	Margaret Hunter	819	4.1	3
Glasgow Govan	Gordon McLennan	1,378	4.4	3
Glasgow Provan	John Jackson	988	2.3	3
Glasgow Scotstoun	Hugh Boyd	2,395	5.4	3
Glasgow Springburn	Neil McLellan	867	3.7	4
Goole	William Carr	952	2.3	3
Greenock	William Dunn	702	2.1	4
Hackney North and Stoke Newington	Monty Goldman	1,491	4.2	3
Hayes and Harlington	Frank Stanley	698	2.1	3
Hornsey	Max Morris	1,184	2.5	4
Islington South West	John Moss	756	3.0	5
Leeds South	Bert Ramelson	714	2.1	3
Liverpool Scotland	Tom Cassin	779	3.9	3
Llanelli	Bob Hitchon	1,211	2.6	4
Luton	Tony Chater	586	1.2	4
Manchester Openshaw	Eddie Marsden	1,479	4.3	3
Mansfield	Fred Westacott	590	1.3	4
Mitcham	Sid French	580	1.1	4
Motherwell	James Sneddon	1,508	4.1	3
Neath	Jim David	1,632	4.2	3
Newcastle-upon-Tyne Central	Tom Welch	404	1.6	3
Nottingham North	John Peck	1,070	2.1	3
Pontypool	Eddie Jones	897	2.5	3
Rhondda East	Annie Powell	2,349	8.4	2
Rhondda West	Arthur True	1,853	7.4	4
St Pancras North	Jock Nicolson	1,253	3.8	3
Sheffield Brightside	Howard Hill	989	2.8	3
Sheffield Park	Cyril Morton	1,022	3.3	3
Southwark	Joe Bent	1,404	4.7	3
Stepney	Solly Kaye	2,209	7.3	3
Stirling and Falkirk	P. McIntosh	767	1.7	4
Stockton-on-Tees	Ernest Jones	710	1.8	3
Stoke-on-Trent South	Sam Lomas	2,262	5.1	3
Swansea East	Bill Jones	902	2.2	4
Swindon	Ike Gradwell	838	2.0	3
West Fife	Archie Macmillan	1,542	3.6	4
West Lothian	Irene Swan	567	1.1	4
Wigan	Mick Weaver	858	2.2	3
Willesden West	Les Burt	1,140	3.1	3

=== By-elections, 1966–70 ===
By-election	Candidate	Votes	%	Position
1967 Glasgow Pollok by-election	Alexander Murray	694	1.8	5
1967 Rhondda West by-election	Arthur True	1,723	6.8	3
1967 Manchester Gorton by-election	Victor Eddisford	437	1.0	5
1968 Sheffield Brightside by-election	Robert Wilkinson	1,069	4.2	3
1969 Glasgow Gorbals by-election	John Kay	361	2.5	4
1969 Swindon by-election	Judith Gradwell	1,723	1.3	4

=== 1970 general election ===
Constituency	Candidate	Votes	%	Position
Aberavon	Julian Tudor Hart	1,102	2.4	4
Aberdare	Alistair Wilson	1,317	3.5	4
Aberdeen North	Margaret Rose	521	1.2	5
Acton	Maurice Costin	258	0.9	4
Battersea North	D. Welsh	179	1.0	4
Birkenhead	Barry Williams	351	0.9	4
Birmingham Northfield	Derek Robinson	605	0.9	3
Birmingham Stechford	Sidney Pegg	298	0.7	4
Bristol North West	W. E. Williams	227	0.5	4
Coventry East	John Hosey	841	1.4	3
Dagenham	George Wake	982	2.2	3
Dundee West	Harry McLevy	809	1.6	4
Dunfermline	John Neilson	462	1.2	4
East Dunbartonshire	Jimmy Reid	1,656	2.3	5
Eccles	Terry Keenan	643	1.5	3
Edinburgh Leith	Irene Swan	413	1.0	4
Glasgow Gorbals	John Kay	376	2.5	4
Glasgow Govan	Thomas Biggam	326	1.5	4
Glasgow Provan	John Jackson	601	1.4	4
Glasgow Scotstoun	Hugh Boyd	846	1.8	4
Glasgow Springburn	Neil McLellan	423	1.8	4
Greenock	William Dunn	559	1.6	3
Hackney North and Stoke Newington	Monty Goldman	793	2.4	3
Hayes and Harlington	Peter Pink	372	1.1	3
Hornsey	Max Morris	624	1.4	4
Huddersfield East	Ethel Beresford	308	0.8	4
Huyton	Joe Kenny	890	1.2	4
Islington South West	Marie Betteridge	509	2.4	4
Lanark	David McDowall	1,273	1.9	4
Leeds East	Joan Bellamy	513	1.0	3
Leeds South East	Bernard Scott	198	1.1	4
Liverpool Exchange	Roger O'Hara	775	4.2	3
Llanelli	Bob Hitchon	603	1.2	5
Luton	Tony Chater	447	1.0	3
Manchester Openshaw	Bernard Panter	552	1.7	3
Mansfield	Fred Westacott	628	1.4	3
Mitcham	Sid French	638	1.3	3
Motherwell	James Sneddon	1,829	4.7	4
Neath	Bert Pearce	579	1.5	4
Nottingham North	John Peck	741	1.5	4
Pontypool	B. Watkinson	435	1.1	4
Rhondda East	Arthur Jones	659	2.3	4
Rhondda West	Arthur True	1,201	4.8	3
St Pancras North	Gordon McLennan	670	2.4	3
Sheffield Brightside	Gordon Ashberry	665	2.0	3
Sheffield Park	Cyril Morton	637	2.1	3
Southwark	E. Hume	1,128	4.5	3
Stepney	Solly Kaye	1,468	5.8	3
Stockton-on-Tees	Ernest Jones	369	0.9	3
Stoke-on-Trent South	Sam Lomas	364	1.1	3
Swansea East	Bill Jones	563	1.4	4
Swindon	Ike Gradwell	456	1.0	3
Walsall North	Don Brayford	597	1.2	3
West Fife	Marie Betteridge	855	1.7	4
West Lothian	Chris Bett	459	0.8	4
Wigan	Jack Kay	672	1.6	3
Willesden West	Les Burt	515	1.6	3
Wolverhampton South West	Pete Carter	189	0.5	4

=== By-elections, 1970–74 ===
By-election	Candidate	Votes	%	Position
1972 Merthyr Tydfil by-election	Arthur Lewis Jones	1,519	4.7	4

=== February 1974 general election ===
Constituency	Candidate	Votes	%	Position
Aberdare	Alistair Wilson	1,038	2.6	4
Birmingham Northfield	Derek Robinson	368	0.7	4
Bootle	Ronald Morris	586	1.3	4
Bothwell	David Bolton	562	1.2	5
Brent South	Les Burt	380	0.9	5
Central Dunbartonshire	Jimmy Reid	5,928	14.6	3
Central Fife	Alex Maxwell	2,019	4.4	4
Clackmannan and Eastern Stirlingshire	George Bolton	322	0.6	4
Coventry North East	John Hosey	838	1.8	4
Dagenham	George Wake	1,169	2.4	3
Dundee West	Harry McLevy	673	1.3	4
East Kilbride	David McDowell	693	1.3	4
Eccles	Terry Keenan	404	0.9	4
Edinburgh East	Irene Swan	274	0.6	5
Glasgow Garscadden	Sammy Barr	635	1.6	4
Glasgow Pollok	Thomas Biggam	377	0.8	4
Glasgow Provan	John Jackson	749	2.0	4
Glasgow Queen's Park	John Kay	372	1.3	4
Glasgow Springburn	Neil McLellan	478	1.4	4
Greenock and Port Glasgow	Alexander Murray	483	1.1	5
Hackney North and Stoke Newington	Monty Goldman	532	1.6	5
Huddersfield East	Tony Drake	246	0.6	5
Islington South and Finsbury	Marie Betteridge	492	1.8	4
Leeds South East	Bill Innes	405	1.2	4
Liverpool Scotland Exchange	Roger O'Hara	505	2.5	4
Llanelli	Bob Hitchon	507	1.0	5
Manchester Openshaw	Philip Widdall	312	1.0	5
Mansfield	Fred Westacott	675	1.3	3
Merthyr Tydfil	Arthur Lewis Jones	369	1.2	5
Mitcham and Morden	Sid French	507	1.0	4
Motherwell and Wishaw	James Sneddon	1,066	2.7	4
Nottingham North	John Peck	754	1.3	4
Pontypool	Graham Williams	498	1.2	5
Rhondda	Arthur True	1,374	2.6	5
St Pancras North	Gordon McLennan	466	1.7	4
Sheffield Brightside	Vi Gill	513	1.3	4
Sheffield Park	Cyril Morton	521	1.1	4
Stepney and Poplar	Kevin Halpin	1,278	3.6	3
Stockton-on-Tees	Ernest Jones	791	1.2	3
Stoke-on-Trent South	Sam Lomas	489	0.9	4
Swansea East	Bill Jones	507	1.2	4
Tooting	Lou Lewis	337	0.9	4
Walsall North	Joe Richards	819	1.6	3
West Lothian	Chris Bett	438	0.7	4

=== October 1974 general election ===
Constituency	Candidate	Votes	%	Position
Aberdare	Alistair Wilson	1,028	2.7	5
Birmingham Northfield	Derek Robinson	180	0.3	5
Bootle	Ronald Morris	516	1.2	4
Central Dunbartonshire	Jimmy Reid	3,417	8.7	4
Central Fife	Alex Maxwell	1,040	2.4	4
Coventry North East	John Hosey	309	0.7	5
Dagenham	George Wake	569	1.3	4
Dundee West	Harry McLevy	381	0.8	5
Eccles	Terry Keenan	348	0.8	4
Edinburgh East	Irene Swan	213	0.5	5
Glasgow Provan	John Jackson	503	1.4	4
Glasgow Queen's Park	John Kay	354	1.4	5
Glasgow Springburn	Neil McLellan	352	1.1	5
Hackney North and Stoke Newington	Monty Goldman	418	1.5	5
Islington South and Finsbury	Marie Betteridge	512	2.2	4
Leeds South East	Bill Innes	317	1.1	4
Liverpool Scotland Exchange	Roger O'Hara	556	2.9	4
Manchester Openshaw	Philip Widdall	300	1.0	4
Mansfield	Fred Westacott	448	0.9	4
Merthyr Tydfil	Tom Roberts	509	1.7	5
Mitcham and Morden	Sid French	281	0.6	4
Motherwell and Wishaw	James Sneddon	946	2.4	5
Nottingham North	John Peck	525	1.0	5
Rhondda	Arthur True	1,404	2.8	5
Sheffield Park	Cyril Morton	403	1.0	4
Stepney and Poplar	Kevin Halpin	617	2.0	4
Tooting	Lou Lewis	268	0.8	4
Walsall North	Joe Richards	465	1.0	4
West Lothian	Chris Bett	247	0.4	5

=== By-elections, 1974–79 ===
By-election	Candidate	Votes	%	Position
1978 Glasgow Garscadden by-election	Sammy Barr	407	1.1	5

=== 1979 general election ===
Constituency	Candidate	Votes	%	Position
Aberavon	Gerald Rowden	406	0.8	5
Aberdare	Mary Winter	518	1.4	4
Birmingham Sparkbrook	Roger Murray	715	2.4	3
Cardiff Central	Richard Spencer	112	0.3	6
Central Dunbartonshire	Daniel McCafferty	1,017	2.6	5
Central Fife	Alex Maxwell	1,172	2.5	4
Coventry North East	Paul Corrigan	390	0.8	5
Dagenham	Dan Connor	553	1.2	5
Dundee West	Raymond Mennie	316	0.6	4
East Kilbride	David McDowell	658	1.1	4
Eccles	Terry Keenan	368	0.8	4
Edinburgh East	Carol Downes	173	0.4	4
Flint East	Glyn Davies	307	0.5	5
Glasgow Garscadden	Sammy Barr	374	1.0	4
Glasgow Maryhill	Peter Smith	287	0.8	5
Glasgow Provan	John Jackson	377	1.1	4
Glasgow Queen's Park	John Kay	263	1.1	4
Hackney North and Stoke Newington	Monty Goldman	440	1.5	5
Hayes and Harlington	John Mansfield	249	0.6	5
Islington South and Finsbury	Marie Betteridge	330	1.4	5
Leeds South East	James Rodgers	190	0.7	4
Liverpool Scotland Exchange	Roger O'Hara	421	2.3	4
Llanelli	Bob Hitchon	617	1.2	5
Luton East	Tom Mitchell	107	0.3	5
Manchester Openshaw	Philip Widdall	174	0.6	4
Merthyr Tydfil	Chris Dennett	223	0.7	5
Motherwell and Wishaw	James Sneddon	740	1.9	4
Norwich North	Andy Panes	106	0.3	6
Nottingham North	John Peck	1,071	2.0	4
Paisley	June Tait	145	0.3	5
Rhondda	Arthur True	1,819	3.6	4
Sheffield Park	Gordon Ashberry	279	0.7	5
Stepney and Poplar	Kevin Halpin	413	1.3	6
Stockton-on-Tees	Jim Smith	243	0.4	6
Swansea East	Bill Jones	308	0.7	4
Tooting	Lou Lewis	233	0.7	5
West Lothian	Bill Sneddon	404	0.6	4

=== By-elections, 1979–83 ===
By-election	Candidate	Votes	%	Position
1982 Birmingham Northfield by-election	Peter Sheppard	349	0.8	5
1982 Glasgow Queen's Park by-election	John Kay	339	2.1	4
1983 Bermondsey by-election	Robert Gordon	50	0.2	10

=== 1983 general election ===
Constituency	Candidate	Votes	%	Position
Bethnal Green and Stepney	J. Rees	243	0.8	5
Birmingham Edgbaston	P. A. Davies	169	0.5	6
Birmingham Northfield	Peter Sheppard	420	0.8	4
Bristol South	A. Chester	224	0.5	5
City of London and Westminster South	A. Spence	161	0.5	6
Clydebank and Milngavie	Jim Bollan	308	0.8	5
Coventry North East	John Meacham	193	0.4	5
Dagenham	D. Walshe	141	0.4	5
Dunfermline East	Alex Maxwell	864	2.4	5
Ealing Acton	S. Pulley	192	0.4	4
East Kilbride	W. Doolan	256	0.5	5
Eccles	B. Cottam	485	1.0	4
Edinburgh Central	D. Carson	119	0.3	5
Falkirk East	Fiona McGregor	334	0.9	5
Glasgow Central	J. P. McGoldrick	347	1.1	5
Glasgow Garscadden	Sammy Barr	218	0.6	5
Glasgow Maryhill	P. Smith	274	0.8	5
Glasgow Provan	I. Jackson	294	1.0	5
Greenwich	F. Hooks	149	0.4	6
Hackney North and Stoke Newington	Monty Goldman	426	1.2	5
Hackney South and Shoreditch	Dave Green	246	0.6	8
Leeds Central	J. M. Rogers	314	0.8	5
Lewisham East	Geoff Roberts	135	0.3	6
Linlithgow	M. Parnell	199	0.5	5
Liverpool Riverside	John C. Blevin	261	0.7	4
Llanelli	Bob Hitchon	371	0.8	5
Manchester Gorton	Malcolm Cowle	333	0.8	4
Nottingham North	John Peck	1,184	2.5	4
Rhondda	Arthur True	1,350	2.8	5
Sheffield Central	Vi Gill	296	0.7	4
Swansea East	Bill Jones	294	0.7	5
Thurrock	J. Paul	199	0.4	6
Tooting	R. E. Lewis	181	0.4	6
Vauxhall	Dave Cook	199	0.5	6
Warley East	H. S. Randhawa	217	0.6	4

=== By-elections, 1983–87 ===
By-election	Candidate	Votes	%	Position
1984 Cynon Valley by-election	Mary Winter	642	1.9	5

=== 1987 general election ===
Constituency	Candidate	Votes	%	Position
Bethnal Green and Stepney	Sarah Louise Gasquoine	232	0.7	4
Birmingham Small Heath	Peter Raymond Sheppard	154	0.5	5
Bristol West	Veronica Ralph	134	0.3	5
Coventry North East	Tom McNally	310	0.7	4
Dundee West	Steve Matthewson	308	0.7	5
Glasgow Central	John Patrick McGoldrick	265	0.8	6
Glasgow Govan	Douglas Chalmers	237	0.6	5
Greenwich	Patricia Clinton	58	0.2	6
Hackney South and Shoreditch	Dave Green	403	1.0	4
Leeds Central	Bill Innes	355	0.9	4
Linlithgow	John Glassford	154	0.3	5
Liverpool Riverside	Katherine Anne Gardner	601	1.7	4
Motherwell South	Robert Somerville	223	0.6	5
Newcastle-upon-Tyne East	Joseph Keith	362	0.9	4
Nottingham North	John Peck	879	1.7	4
Rhondda	Arthur True	869	1.8	5
Sheffield Central	Keith Edward Petts	203	0.5	5
Southwark and Bermondsey	Peter Nigel Power	108	0.3	4
Vauxhall	Dave Cook	223	0.5	5

=== By-elections, 1987–90 ===
By-election	Candidate	Votes	%	Position
1988 Glasgow Govan by-election	Douglas Chalmers	281	0.9	6
1989 Pontypridd by-election	David Richards	239	0.6	6
