= 1969 Glasgow Gorbals by-election =

1969 UK parliamentary by-election

The 1969 Glasgow Gorbals by-election was a parliamentary by-election held on 30 October 1969 for the House of Commons constituency of Glasgow Gorbals in Glasgow. It was one of five UK parliamentary by-elections held on that day.

== Background ==
The seat had become vacant when the sitting Labour Member of Parliament (MP), Alice Cullen had died on 31 May 1969, aged 78. She had held the seat since the by-election in 1948 following the resignation of her Labour predecessor, George Buchanan. The moving of the writ was much delayed and finally announced in early-October. Because of the recess and parliamentary convention, the formal campaign only lasted two weeks.

Labour had a good record in the seat, and in 1966, Cullen's had polled 73.1% of the votes, 50.3% ahead of the second placed Conservative candidate. The constituency's electorate had shrunk considerably in the past few years. In 1955, there had been a total of 56,627 electors, but by the time of the by-election this number had fallen to just 25,057.

Labour's nominee to defend the seat was Frank McElhone, aged 40, who was a fruiterer. The Conservatives chose William Shearer, a 59-year-old builder, while the Scottish National Party (SNP) ran Tom Brady, an electrical engineer aged 26. All three men were also sitting Glasgow councillors. As this was the first by-election in Scotland since the SNP's capture of Hamilton in 1967, there was interest in how well the SNP would perform, though privately Labour were said to be confident of victory and thought that the SNP would finish "a poor second or third."

On the day of the election, bookmakers made Labour favourites to hold the seat with odds of 10 to 1 on, with odds on SNP and Conservative victories being quoted as 6–1 against and 16–1 against respectively. An editorial in The Glasgow Herald on the day of the by-election reflected these odds stating that "as it stands, Frank McElhone looks as certain as these things can be to take the seat for Labour." However it predicted a tight contest for second place, arguing that the Conservative Shearer had fought a good campaign which might help him to just finish in front of the SNP.

== Result ==
The result of the contest was a victory for the Labour Party candidate, Frank McElhone, who won with a majority of 4,163 votes over the SNP candidate Tom Brady.

Glasgow Gorbals by-election, 1969
| Party | Candidate | Votes | % | ±% |
|---|---|---|---|---|
| Labour | Frank McElhone | 7,834 | 53.4 | −19.7 |
| SNP | Tom Brady | 3,671 | 25.0 | New |
| Conservative | William Shearer | 2,732 | 18.6 | −4.2 |
| Communist | John Kay | 361 | 2.5 | −1.6 |
| Workers Party of Scotland | Matt Lygate | 72 | 0.5 | New |
| Majority | | 4,163 | 28.4 | −21.8 |
| Turnout | | 14,670 | 58.5 | −3.3 |
| Labour hold | | Swing | | |

== Aftermath ==
Covering the by-election result the next day, John Warden, the political correspondent of The Glasgow Herald reported that the result was a disappointment for the SNP, arguing that "By the standards of any serious contender as a third party the S.N.P. were knocked out in Gorbals" and that given "the claims and ambitions of their leaders they need to do better than the 25% of the votes they won yesterday." Warden further argued that the result signaled "a weakening of the urban strength" that the SNP relied on and that while no one would "write the Nationalists off... the S.N.P. challenge has now been cut down to size." Warden also argued that of the four seats Labour held in the five by-elections held that day (they lost the fifth in Swindon to the Conservatives), the Gorbals result was the only one where the result was not too close for comfort for the Party.

At the subsequent general election the following June the three main candidates faced off again, with McElhone greatly increasing his majority and vote share. Shearer also slightly increased his vote share and finished second, but the SNP vote share fell from 25% to 7.4% and Brady lost his deposit.

== See also ==
- Glasgow Gorbals (UK Parliament constituency)
- 1948 Glasgow Gorbals by-election
- List of United Kingdom by-elections (1950–1979)
- 1969 Islington North by-election
- 1969 Newcastle-under-Lyme by-election
- 1969 Paddington North by-election
- 1969 Swindon by-election
