= William Whitlock (politician) =

British politician (1918–2001)

William Charles Whitlock

Member of Parliament for Nottingham North
- In office 1959–1983
- Preceded by: James Harrison
- Succeeded by: Richard Ottaway

Personal details
- Party: Labour
- Born: 20 June 1918; Southampton, Hampshire, England
- Died: 2 November 2001 (aged 83); Leicester, England
- Education: Itchen Grammar School
- Alma mater: University of Southampton
- Occupations: Politician; British Army Officer
- Military career
- Allegiance: United Kingdom
- Branch: British Army
- Service years: 1939-1946
- Units: Hampshire Regiment; British 1st Airborne Division
- Conflicts: World War II; Dunkirk evacuation; Operation Market Garden

William Charles Whitlock (Southampton, 20 June 1918 – 2 November 2001, Leicester) was a British Labour Party politician.

Whitlock was educated at Itchen Grammar School and the University of Southampton. He volunteered for the British Army upon graduation, and soon joined the Hampshire Regiment. Part of the British Expeditionary Force (BEF), he was one of those evacuated on the last day at Dunkirk, escaping aboard a fishing trawler in June 1940. At the end of 1940, he volunteered for the airborne forces. Assigned to the British 1st Airborne Division, he landed near Nijmegen during Operation Market Garden in September 1944 and was one of the relatively few British airborne troops to escape death or capture during the operation. An excellent linguist, he remained in the Army for an extra year, acting as a German translator during the occupation.

He was appointed as an area organiser of the Union of Shop, Distributive and Allied Workers in 1946. In 1957, he became President of the Leicester City Labour Party.

Whitlock was elected as the Member of Parliament (MP) for Nottingham North in 1959. Throughout his career, he was a champion of improved conditions for office workers. A party whip from 1962, Whitlock was appointed Vice-Chamberlain of the Household in 1964, and retained the office until 1966. He was then briefly a Lord Commissioner of the Treasury before being appointed Comptroller of the Household. In 1967, he was again briefly a Commissioner of the Treasury before being appointed Under-Secretary of State for Commonwealth Relations. At that office, he was responsible for African affairs, and he advocated the admission of Asians expelled from Uganda into Britain. At the merger of the Foreign Office and Commonwealth Relations in 1968, he became Parliamentary Under-Secretary of State for Foreign and Commonwealth Affairs. Sent in 1969 to negotiate with the fledgling government of Anguilla, then seceding from Saint Kitts and Nevis, he was unceremoniously expelled from the country at gunpoint. The incident ended his ministerial career.

In 1983, he unexpectedly lost his seat to the Conservative Party candidate Richard Ottaway as part of Labour's national landslide defeat that year. The margin of defeat of 362 votes (0.8%) was less than the 1,184 votes gained by the Communist candidate John Peck.

== Sources ==
- Times Guide to the House of Commons, 1966 and 1983
- The Almanac of British Politics 1999
- Leigh Rayment's Historical List of MPs

Parliament of the United Kingdom
Preceded by James Harrison	Member of Parliament for Nottingham North; 1959–1983	Succeeded by Richard Ottaway
Political offices
Preceded by Graeme Bell Finlay	Vice-Chamberlain of the Household; 1964–1966	Succeeded by Jack McCann
Preceded by Charles Frederick Gray	Comptroller of the Household; 1966–1967	Succeeded by William Howie
Preceded by Lord Beswick	Under-Secretary of State for Commonwealth Affairs; 1967 – 1968	Office Abolished
New institution	Under-Secretary of State for Foreign and Commonwealth Affairs; 1968 – 1969	Succeeded by Evan Luard
