= Graham Allen (politician) =

British Labour Party politician

Vice-Chamberlain of the Household
- In office 27 July 1998 – 8 June 2001
- Prime Minister: Tony Blair
- Preceded by: Janet Anderson
- Succeeded by: Gerry Sutcliffe

Lord Commissioner of the Treasury
- In office 8 May 1997 – 27 July 1998
- Prime Minister: Tony Blair
- Chancellor: Gordon Brown
- Preceded by: Gyles Brandreth
- Succeeded by: Clive Betts

Member of Parliament for Nottingham North
- In office 11 June 1987 – 3 May 2017
- Preceded by: Richard Ottaway
- Succeeded by: Alex Norris

Personal details
- Born: 11 January 1953 (age 73) Nottingham, Nottinghamshire, England
- Party: Labour
- Spouse: Allyson Stewart
- Education: University of Leeds, London Guildhall University
- Website: parliament..graham-allen

Graham William Allen (born 11 January 1953) is a British Labour Party politician, who was the Member of Parliament (MP) for Nottingham North from 1987 to 2017. He stood down at the 2017 general election.

== Early life ==
Graham Allen was born in 1953 in Aspley, Nottingham. He is the cousin of SDP politician Rosie Barnes (née Allen).

He was educated at the local Robert Shaw Primary School and Forest Fields Grammar School in Forest Fields. He graduated from City of London Polytechnic, and received an MA from the University of Leeds.

He joined the Labour Party in 1971 whilst employed as a warehouse worker. He worked from 1978 to 1983 as a Research Officer for the Labour Party. In 1982 he was elected as a councillor in the London Borough of Tower Hamlets, where he served until 1986. He was a local government officer at Greater London Council between 1983 and 1984, before working for the trade union movement, running the first political fund ballots, and then with the GMB until his election in 1987.

== Parliamentary career ==
Allen was elected as the Labour MP for the Nottingham North constituency at the 1987 general election, gaining the seat from the Conservative's Richard Ottaway with a majority of 1,665 votes. His majority at the 2010 general election was 8,138.

After helping to organise Tony Blair's leadership campaign, Allen was given a series of shadow portfolios, including social security, transport and the environment. After the Labour Party came to power at the 1997 general election Allen became a government whip until after the 2001 general election, when he returned to the backbenches.

Allen was liberated by his move to the backbenches, which freed him to speak out publicly on the few elements of government policy he opposed. Allen took a stand against the Iraq War, and with his Constituency Agent Ian Murphy, he stood at the forefront of a successful campaign to recall Parliament in September 2002, attempting to organise an unofficial recall if the House would not formally sit.

Allen sat on a number of parliamentary select committees, and was the chair of the Political and Constitutional Reform Select Committee in the House of Commons from 2010 to 2015. He is also a member of the Speaker's Committee on the Electoral Commission.

Allen is a patron of Humanists UK (formerly British Humanist Association) and has campaigned against faith schools in the United Kingdom. He is an honorary associate of the National Secular Society.

In 2011, he voted against military intervention in Libya.

Allen announced he would stand down at the 2017 general election due to ill health.

=== Democratic reform ===
Allen was a proponent of democratic reform and supported independent local government, some proportional representation and a fully elected House of Lords. He introduced a bill calling for a written constitution in the UK.

In 1995, he wrote "Reinventing Democracy" and in November 2002 he published The Last Prime Minister: Being Honest About the UK Presidency, claiming that the UK effectively had a presidency. He argued that the Prime Minister (or 'President', as he referred to the office throughout the book) should be directly and separately elected in order for a better separation of powers. This new arrangement, he argued, would be best spelled out "in plain English" in a written constitution. Allen argues that a codified constitution would institutionalise the informal powers that the British prime minister has obtained, subsequently creating a system of checks and balances that act to limit the power of the prime minister.

Allen expanded on this in 2019, when he launched plans for a Citizens Convention on UK Democracy with cross-party support from MPs including Vince Cable, David Davis, Dominic Grieve, Caroline Lucas and Tom Watson. The convention aimed to involve millions of people in a process of recommending changes to improve democracy including a review of the Parliamentary "Second Chamber", the House of Lords, devolution and the regions, paying for politics, the voting system and a written constitution to enshrine in law things done by convention that do not currently exist in a statute.

The convention was planned to convene in 2020 and run through to the end of 2021.

=== Early intervention ===
Allen was a strong advocate of early intervention in social issues. He wrote "Early Intervention, good parents, great kids, better citizens" with Iain Duncan Smith in 2009. He wrote two reports for the government on the topic in 2011.

=== Constituency ===
In October 2005, Allen became the first MP to chair a Local Strategic Partnership, which was subsequently renamed One Nottingham. Allen set it the mission of making Nottingham an "Early Intervention City".

Parliament of the United Kingdom
Preceded by Richard Ottaway	Member of Parliament for Nottingham North; 1987–2017	Succeeded by Alex Norris
Political offices
Preceded by Janet Anderson	Vice-Chamberlain of the Household; 1998–2001	Succeeded by Gerry Sutcliffe
