= Dave Springhall =

British communist activist

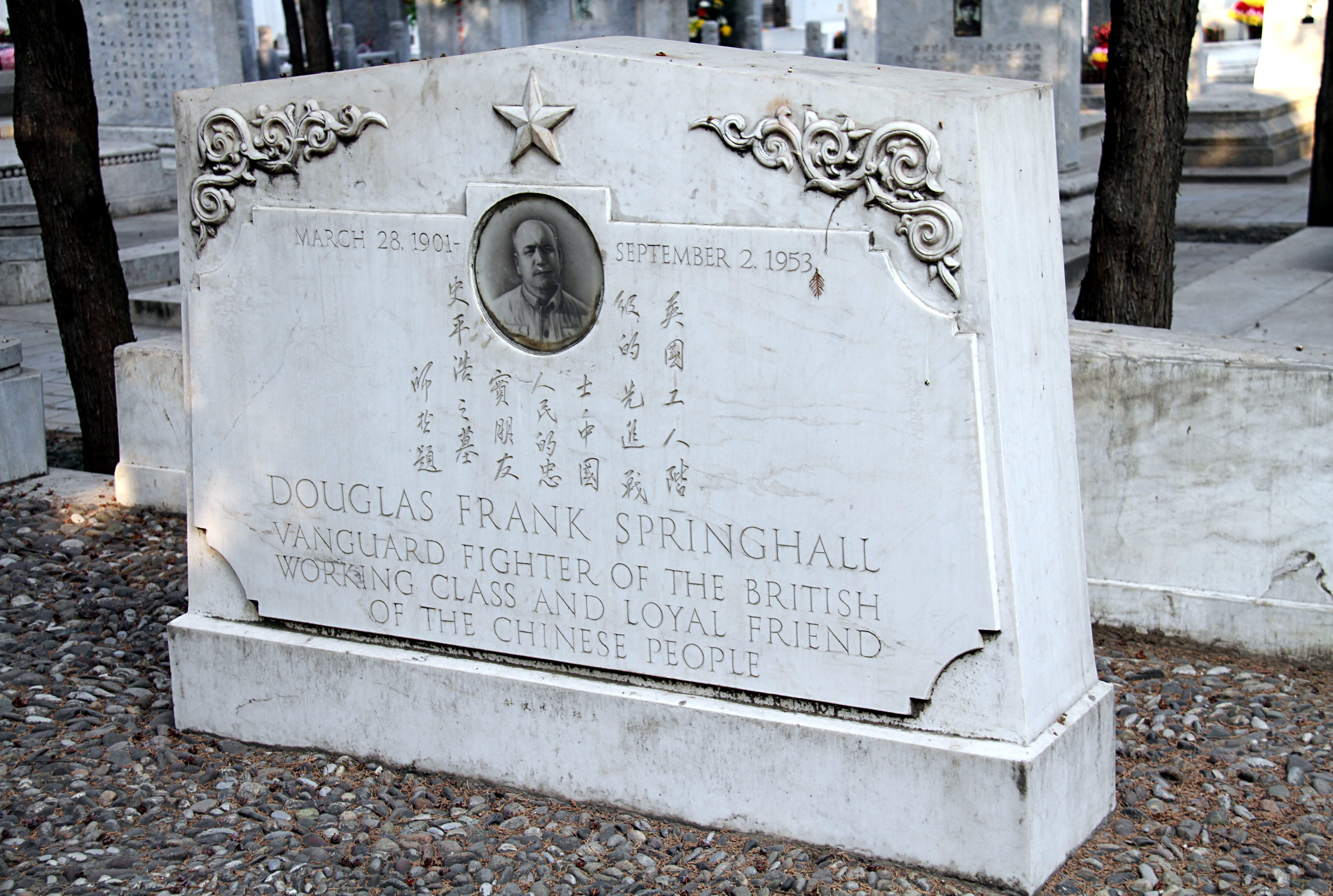
Headstone for Douglas Frank Springhall on the Babaoshan Revolutionary Cemetery in Beijing.

Douglas Frank Springhall (28 March 1901 – 2 September 1953), known as Dave Springhall, was a British communist activist.

Born in Kensal Green, Springhall joined the Royal Navy at the age of fifteen, during World War I. In 1920, he wrote "Discontent on the Lower Deck", an article for the communist publication Workers' Dreadnought, leading to his dismissal from the Navy for "associating with extremists".

Springhall joined the Communist Party of Great Britain (CPGB) and its affiliated Young Communist League (YCL). He worked as a builder, but struggled to find employment, focussing his time on the National Unemployed Workers' Committee Movement and the trade union movement. He stood as a Labour Party candidate for Richmond Town Council, then later as a Communist candidate, but was not elected.

In 1924, Springhall was a delegate to the Fifth Congress of the Communist International, and also the Fourth Congress of the Young Communist International. In 1926, following the imprisonment of William Rust, he became Acting Secretary of the YCL, serving during the British general strike, for which he was twice jailed himself. From 1928 to 1931, Springhall studied at the International Lenin School. He then returned to the UK, when he led moves to expel Trotskyists from the CPGB. From this period on, he may have been working for the GRU. By 1937 he was secretary of the London district of the Communist party and a member of the party's Political Bureau.

== Spanish Civil War ==
During the Spanish Civil War, Springhall served as the first political commissar of the British Battalion of the XV International Brigade, later becoming Assistant Commissar of the XV International Brigade. Although politically experienced, he was described as "a pleasant, but hopelessly obtuse and humourless man ... he seemed to be a well-intentioned man who was completely out of his depth in the position in which he found himself". On 12 January 1937, following the Battle of Lopera and tensions between British and Irish volunteers, he called a meeting to discuss the issue. The stormy meeting resulted in the Irish volunteers voting to join the Abraham Lincoln Battalion. The meeting may have been a political miscalculation, but Irish volunteers saw it as a deliberate stunt by British Communists to ruin the chances of forming an Irish national unit. Springhall later admitted he was glad the Irish group had left, but he was blamed by many senior communist figures for a "grave political mistake". Although he was shot at the Battle of Jarama, on 27 February 1937, the bullet passed through his cheeks and he was not seriously wounded. He returned to the UK in 1938.

== World War II ==
On his return to the UK he became editor of the Daily Worker, then briefly served as the CPGB's representative in Moscow. He returned to the UK again to ensure that the party supported the Molotov–Ribbentrop Pact. General Secretary Harry Pollitt opposed this and was removed, Springhall working as National Organiser to lead the party alongside Rust and Rajani Palme Dutt. The British government were concerned in early 1940 having seen copies of secret lecture notes by Springhall urging comrades in the armed forces to "initiate all effective actions against the war". MI5 reported that Springhall was a "dangerous type of Communist agitator" and exempted from military service as he would "certainly constitute a serious menance to morale and discipline" in the armed forces.

In 1943, Springhall was caught receiving secret documents from Olive Mary Sheehan, a clerk in the Air Ministry telecommunications office, who was also cadres leader of the secret Air Ministry group of the Communist Party. After his arrest and interrogation by MI5, he was found guilty under the Official Secrets Act on 28 July 1943 of obtaining "for a purpose prejudicial to the safety or interests of the State information which might be useful to the enemy". He was given a seven-year prison sentence. He was thought to have been spying since 1941. He was subsequently removed from his party posts. It subsequently emerged that he had also obtained classified information from Ormond Uren of the Special Operations Executive. He served four-and-a-half years of a seven-year penal servitude sentence. On his release, he worked in advertising before travelling through Eastern Europe to China, where he worked as an advisor to the Chinese Information Bureau of the Press Administration. He travelled to Moscow in 1953 to receive treatment for throat cancer, but died there aged 52. His grave is located at the Babaoshan Revolutionary Cemetery in Beijing.

Media offices
Preceded by Rajani Palme Dutt	Editor of the Daily Worker; 1938–1939	Succeeded by John Ross Campbell
Party political offices
Preceded by Robbie Robson	London District Secretary of the Communist Party of Great Britain; 1930s–1937	Succeeded by Ted Bramley
Preceded by Robbie Robson	National Organiser of the Communist Party of Great Britain; 1940–1943	Succeeded by Peter Kerrigan
Military offices
Preceded by New position	Political Commissar of the British Battalion; 1936 – 1937	Succeeded by George Aitken
