= Richard Ottaway =

British Conservative politician (born 1945)

The Right Honourable Sir Richard Ottaway
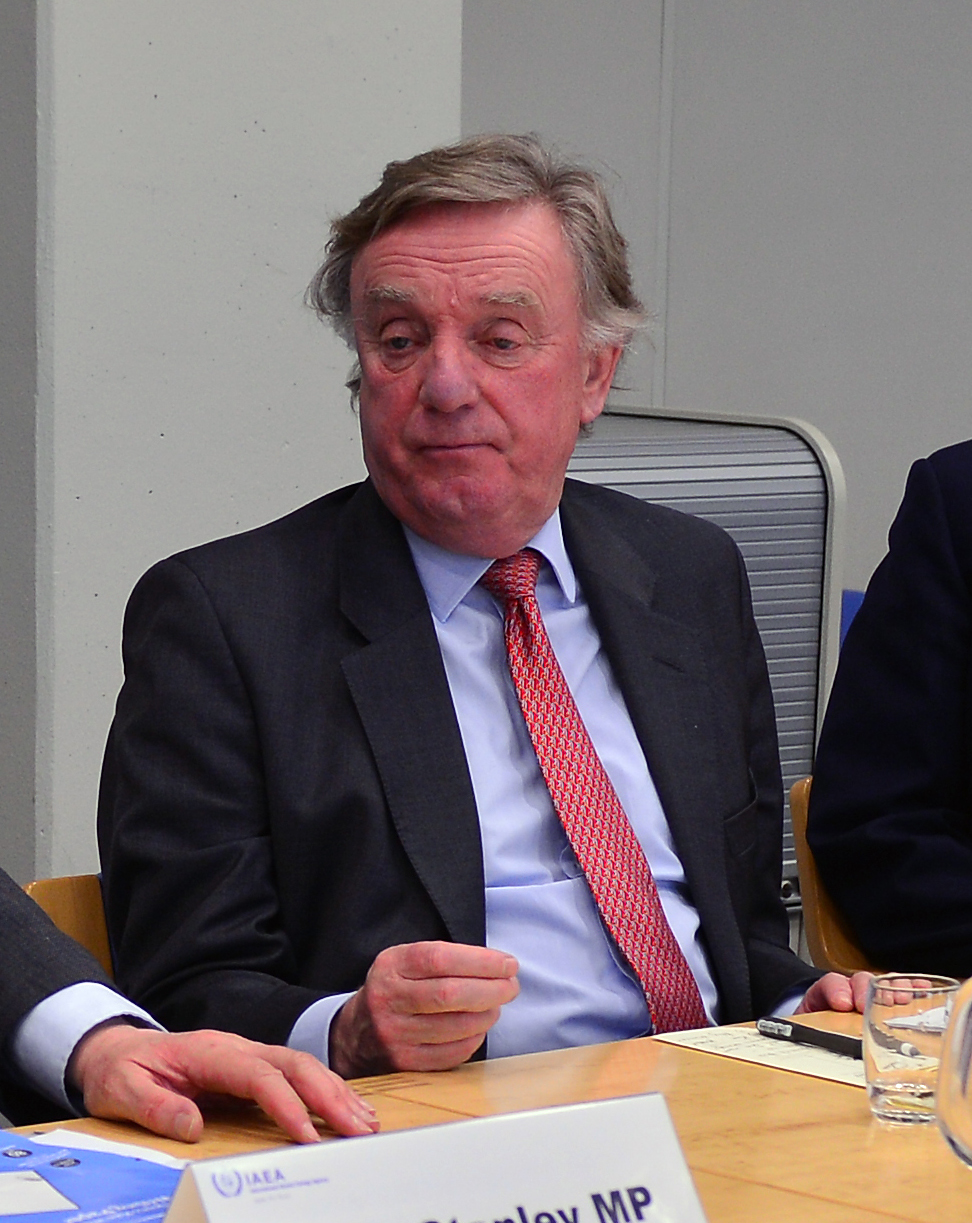

Chair of the Foreign Affairs Select Committee
- In office 17 May 2010 – 30 March 2015
- Preceded by: Mike Gapes
- Succeeded by: Crispin Blunt

Shadow Secretary of State for the Environment
- In office 15 March 2004 – 10 May 2005
- Leader: Michael Howard
- Preceded by: Caroline Spelman
- Succeeded by: Oliver Letwin (Environment, Food and Rural Affairs)

Lord Commissioner of the Treasury
- In office 23 July 1996 – 1 May 1997
- Prime Minister: John Major
- Preceded by: Derek Conway
- Succeeded by: Jim Dowd

Member of Parliament for Croydon South
- In office 9 April 1992 – 30 March 2015
- Preceded by: William Clark
- Succeeded by: Chris Philp

Member of Parliament for Nottingham North
- In office 9 June 1983 – 18 May 1987
- Preceded by: William Whitlock
- Succeeded by: Graham Allen

Personal details
- Born: 24 May 1945 (age 81) Sonning, England
- Party: Conservative
- Spouse: Nicola Ottaway
- Education: Britannia Royal Naval College; University of Bristol

Military service
- Allegiance: United Kingdom
- Branch/service: Royal Navy
- Years of service: 1961–1970
- Rank: Lieutenant

Sir Richard Geoffrey James Ottaway (born 24 May 1945) is a British Conservative Party politician and consultant. He was the Member of Parliament for Croydon South from 1992 to 2015. Ottaway also served as the MP for Nottingham North from 1983 to 1987.

== Early life ==
Ottaway was born on 24 May 1945 in Sonning, Berkshire. He attended Backwell School, a secondary modern school in Backwell, North Somerset. He joined the Royal Navy as an artificer apprentice in 1961 and undertook officer training at the Britannia Royal Naval College in Dartmouth in 1965. He also served as the Royal Navy officer between 1965 and 1970 as a Lieutenant, deployed in HMS Beachampton, HMS Nubian, and the aircraft carrier HMS Eagle. He served as a lieutenant commander in the Royal Naval Reserve (RNR) from 1971 to 1980.

Ottaway studied law at Bristol University, graduating in 1974. He qualified as a solicitor in 1977, specializing in maritime and commercial law, and was a partner of William A. Crump & Son in London in 1981–87. He was a director of Coastal States Petroleum (UK) Ltd in 1988–95.

== Parliamentary career ==
Ottaway was Conservative MP for Nottingham North from 1983 to 1987. This was a safe Labour Party seat, which he won unexpectedly with a majority of 362 in the Conservative landslide following the Falklands War. Unsurprisingly the seat reverted to Labour in 1987, when he was defeated by Graham Allen. Ottaway re-entered Parliament in 1992 when he won the constituency of Croydon South.

On re-entering parliament in 1992, Ottaway served as Parliamentary Private Secretary to Michael Heseltine MP and from October 1995 he was a Government Whip. In opposition from 1997, he was a Front Bench spokesman as Shadow Minister for London and Local Government, Shadow Defence Minister, Shadow Paymaster General and Shadow Secretary of State for the Environment.

Between 2005 and 2010 Parliament he was a member of the Intelligence and Security Committee, Vice Chairman of the 1922 Committee and a member of the Conservative Party. After the 2010 election, he became the first Chairman of the Foreign Affairs Select Committee to be elected by MPs from all parliamentary parties.

In 2011, he was declared The Week's "Backbencher of the Year" based on his committee's enquiry into Afghanistan that was highly critical of Government policy and urged the UK to do more to encourage the US to talk with the Taliban in pursuance of peace.

Ottaway chaired the All Party Parliamentary London 2012 Olympic and Paralympic Group and was a member of the All Party Parliamentary Group for Population, Development and Reproductive Health. In 2012 he won the Population Institute's Global Media Award for ground-breaking research into population growth. His report Sex, Ideology and Religion: 10 Myths about World Population won the Institute's Best Essay category.

As a long-standing campaigner for the right of terminally ill people to die at home of their choosing, Ottaway tabled a historic backbench committee debate on assisted suicide in the House of Commons in March 2012. This resulted in Parliament agreeing for the first time that it is not in the public interest to prosecute people who compassionately help a loved one requesting assistance to die. However, assisting suicide is still illegal and the issue is controversial. He subsequently made the case for assisted dying – suicide with the help of medical professionals. In October 2012, he debated at the Oxford Union in favour of the motion: This House Would Legalise Assisted Dying, and won by 167 to 131 votes.

In October 2012, Ottaway announced his decision not to stand in 2015. He was appointed to the Privy Council in October 2013. On 12 November 2013, Chris Philp was selected to become the next Conservative parliamentary candidate for Croydon South.

Ottaway was knighted in the 2014 New Year Honours for parliamentary and political service.

=== Foreign Affairs Select Committee ===
After the 2010 General Election, Ottaway was elected Chairman of the House of Commons Select Committee on Foreign Affairs. The Committee's enquires included the Foreign and Commonwealth Office's Human Rights work, the UK's relations with Saudi Arabia and Bahrain, foreign policy implications of and for a separate Scotland, and the future of the EU. Through correspondence with Foreign Secretary William Hague, he raised concerns about the legality of arming rebels in Syria. He led an inquiry into the UK's relationship with Hong Kong, a former British colony, 30 years after the Joint Declaration amid series pro-democracy protests.

Ottaway voted for the Iraq War based on evidence presented to Parliament but subsequently regretted his decision as he believed parliament and the country had been misled. Ottaway was a member of the Foreign Affairs Committee in 2003 when the committee took evidence from David Kelly, the former UN weapons inspector who revealed details of the dossier on weapons of mass destruction in Iraq. His questioning of Prime Minister Tony Blair on 4 February 2003 revealed that Blair had not appreciated that Iraq possessed only defensive battlefield or small-calibre weaponry rather than long-range weapons of mass destruction when he made his speech in the Iraq debate that led to the House of Commons voting in favour of war. Ottaway asserted that if that information had been conveyed to MPs “those weapons might not have been described as weapons of mass destruction threatening the region and the stability of the world”.

=== Europe ===
Ottaway was a founding member of the European Mainstream Group, formed in February 2013 to articulate a positive Conservative attitude to Europe as set out by David Cameron in his Bloomberg Speech.

As Chairman of the Foreign Affairs Committee, Ottaway presided over an inquiry into the Future of the EU and supported a referendum on EU Referendum Bill. On 15 May 2013, he made the economic case for staying in the EU in the Queen’s Speech debate on economic growth. He answered his main opponent on the day in an article in ConservativeHome.

=== Scrap Metal Dealers Act 2013 ===
In 2013, Ottaway celebrated the passing of his Private Member’s Bill to crack down on metal theft and the desecration of war memorials by tighter regulation of scrap metal dealers. His interest in metal theft dated back to 2009, when thieves stole lead from a constituency parish church.

The Bill won overwhelming support in both Houses as well as from the Government. It was backed by organisations including The Royal British Legion, War Memorials Trust, Church of England, Network Rail, BT, the Energy Networks Association, the Institute of Directors, the Federation of Small Businesses, Arts Council England, Tate Galleries, the Henry Moore Foundation, the Local Government Association, British Transport Police and the British Metals Recycling Association. The Scrap Metal Dealers Act 2013 received Royal Assent on 28 February 2013 and was implemented on 1 October 2013, in time for the centenary of the outbreak of the First World War.

=== 2009 expenses scandal ===
During the Daily Telegraph expenses scandal it was revealed that Ottaway claimed for a second home nine miles south of the constituency, with another house minutes from Parliament. Ottaway apologised to constituents for his part in 'allowing an indefensible system of allowances to develop' and announced he would let Croydon South party members decide his fate in a vote of confidence. The local association's President, Lord Bowness, chaired the meeting, which ended in a secret ballot that Ottaway won.

Among his expenses claims between April 2004 and March 2008 were £59.99 on light bulbs and £48 for modifying a scarifier. He paid back £2,025 that he had claimed as half of the price of an orthopaedic bed and £1,400 for homeware and electrical goods. David Cameron's Conservative head office scrutiny panel did not ask him to pay back any more.

=== 2014 incident with constituents ===
It was reported that Ottaway called the police for 'security' when a group of constituents – most of whom were of pension age – visited his office to hand in a petition against the 'Gagging Law' (Transparency of Lobbying, non-Party Campaigning, and Trade Union Administration Bill) on 17 January 2014. A Metropolitan Police spokesman said: "Officers spoke to all parties. No offences were identified and the officers left." Ottaway, however, was reported as saying that he would do the same again.

== Personal life ==
Ottaway married Nicky, a magistrate and former international television production executive, in 1982. He is also an enthusiastic amateur yachtsman, winning several regattas in Daring keelboat class in Cowes. He is a member of the Royal Thames Yacht Club, the Royal London Yacht Club, and the Island Sailing Club.

He is the nephew of the actor James Ottaway.

Parliament of the United Kingdom
Preceded by William Whitlock	Member of Parliament for Nottingham North; 1983–1987	Succeeded by Graham Allen
Preceded by William Clark	Member of Parliament for Croydon South; 1992–2015	Succeeded by Chris Philp
Preceded by Mike Gapes	Chair of the Foreign Affairs Committee; 2010–2015	Succeeded by Crispin Blunt
Political offices
Preceded by Caroline Spelman	Shadow Secretary of State for the Environment; 2004–2005	Succeeded by Oliver Letwin as Shadow Secretary of State for Environment, Food and Rural Affairs
