= Glasgow Gorbals =

Former parliamentary constituency in the United Kingdom

- Former burgh constituency for the House of Commons
- Subdivision: County of city of Glasgow

1918–1974
- Seats: One
- Created from: Mid Lanarkshire
- Replaced by: Glasgow Queen's Park, Glasgow Govan

Glasgow Gorbals was a parliamentary constituency in the city of Glasgow. From 1918 until 1974, it returned one Member of Parliament (MP) to the House of Commons of the Parliament of the United Kingdom, elected by the first-past-the-post system.

== Boundaries ==
The Representation of the People Act 1918 provided that the constituency was to consist of "That portion of the city which is bounded by a line commencing at a point on the municipal boundary at the centre line of the River Clyde about 77 yards east of the centre of Rutherglen Bridge, thence southwestward along the municipal boundary to the centre of the Caledonian Railway Main Line from Glasgow to Rutherglen, thence north-westward along the centre line of the said Caledonian Railway to the centre line of the Glasgow and South Western Railway, thence south-westward along the centre line of the said Glasgow and South Western Railway to the centre line of Victoria Road, thence northward along the centre line of Victoria Road, Eglinton Street, Bridge Street and Glasgow Bridge to the centre line of the River Clyde, thence south-eastward along the centre line of the River Clyde to the point of commencement."

1950–1955: The County of the City of Glasgow wards of Gorbals and Hutchesontown, and part of Govanhill ward.

1955–1974: The County of the City of Glasgow wards of Gorbals and Hutchesontown, and parts of Govanhill and Kingston wards.

== Members of Parliament ==
Election	Member	Party
1918	George Barnes	Coalition Labour
1922	George Buchanan	Labour
1931	George Buchanan	Ind. Labour
1939	George Buchanan	Labour Party
1948 by-election	Alice Cullen	Labour
1969 by-election	Frank McElhone	Labour
Feb 1974	constituency abolished: see Glasgow Queen's Park	

== Election results ==
=== Elections in the 1970s ===
General election 1970: Glasgow Gorbals
Party	Candidate	Votes	%	±%
Labour	Frank McElhone	10,260	69.3	−3.8
Conservative	William Shearer	3,071	20.8	−2.0
SNP	Thomas Brady	1,089	7.4	N/A
Communist	John Kay	376	2.5	−1.6
Majority		7,189	48.6	−1.6
Turnout		14,796	59.7	−2.0
Labour hold		Swing		

=== Elections in the 1960s ===
1969 Glasgow Gorbals by-election
Party	Candidate	Votes	%	±%
Labour	Frank McElhone	7,834	53.4	−19.7
SNP	Thomas Brady	3,671	25.0	New
Conservative	William Shearer	2,732	18.6	−4.2
Communist	John Kay	361	2.5	−1.6
Workers (Scotland)	Matt Lygate	72	0.5	New
Majority		4,163	28.4	−21.8
Turnout		14,670	58.5	−3.3
Labour hold		Swing		

General election 1966: Glasgow Gorbals
Party	Candidate	Votes	%	±%
Labour	Alice Cullen	14,453	73.1	+1.7
Conservative	William C Hunter	4,513	22.8	−0.2
Communist	Margaret Hunter	819	4.1	−1.5
Majority		9,940	50.2	+1.8
Turnout		19,785	61.7	−2.8
Labour hold		Swing		

General election 1964: Glasgow Gorbals
Party	Candidate	Votes	%	±%
Labour	Alice Cullen	16,931	71.4	+8.1
Unionist	William C Hunter	5,455	23.0	−7.8
Communist	Margaret Hunter	1,339	5.6	−0.3
Majority		11,476	48.4	+15.8
Turnout		23,725	64.5	−3.7
Labour hold		Swing		

=== Elections in the 1950s ===
General election 1959: Glasgow Gorbals
Party	Candidate	Votes	%	±%
Labour	Alice Cullen	20,731	63.3	+2.1
Unionist	William C Hunter	10,072	30.8	−1.3
Communist	Peter Kerrigan	1,932	5.9	−0.9
Majority		10,659	32.6	+3.5
Turnout		32,735	68.2	+3.0
Labour hold		Swing		

General election 1955: Glasgow Gorbals
Party	Candidate	Votes	%	±%
Labour	Alice Cullen	22,567	61.2	−0.6
Unionist	William B Thomson	11,839	32.1	+0.1
Communist	Peter Kerrigan	2,491	6.8	+0.6
Majority		10,728	29.1	−0.8
Turnout		36,897	65.2	−10.9
Labour hold		Swing		

General election 1951: Glasgow Gorbals
Party	Candidate	Votes	%	±%
Labour	Alice Cullen	25,288	61.8	+2.8
Unionist	James A Young	13,069	32.0	+0.5
Communist	Peter Kerrigan	2,553	6.2	+0.3
Majority		12,219	29.9	+3.3
Turnout		40,910	76.1	−0.7
Labour hold		Swing		

General election 1950: Glasgow Gorbals
Party	Candidate	Votes	%	±%
Labour	Alice Cullen	24,137	58.0	−22.0
Unionist	James A Young	13,078	31.4	+11.5
Communist	Peter Kerrigan	2,435	5.9	New
Anti-Partition	William McGuinness	1,959	4.7	New
Majority		11.059	26.6	−33.4
Turnout		41,609	77.3	+19.9
Labour hold		Swing		

=== Elections in the 1940s ===
1948 Glasgow Gorbals by-election
Party	Candidate	Votes	%	±%
Labour	Alice Cullen	13,706	54.56	−25.44
Unionist	W. Roxburgh	7,181	28.59	+8.59
Communist	Peter Kerrigan	4,233	16.85	+16.85
Majority		6,525	25.97	−34.01
Turnout		25,120		
Labour hold		Swing	+17.02	

General election 1945: Glasgow Gorbals
Party	Candidate	Votes	%	±%
Labour	George Buchanan	21,073	80.0	+74.1
Unionist	Ian Mactaggart	5,269	20.0	+9.9
Majority		15,804	60.0	N/A
Turnout		26,342	56.9	
Labour gain from Ind. Labour Party		Swing		

=== Elections in the 1930s ===
General election 1935: Glasgow Gorbals
Party	Candidate	Votes	%	±%
Ind. Labour Party	George Buchanan	22,860	75.02	
Unionist	M. Bloch	5,824	19.11	
Labour	Alexander Burnett	1,786	5.86	
Majority		17,036	55.91	N/A
Turnout		31,470		
Ind. Labour Party gain from Independent Labour		Swing		

General election 1931: Glasgow Gorbals
Party	Candidate	Votes	%	±%
Independent Labour	George Buchanan	19,278	58.12	
Unionist	M. Bloch	11,264	33.96	
Communist	Harry McShane	2,626	7.92	New
Majority		8,014	24.16	N/A
Turnout		33,168		
Independent Labour gain from Labour		Swing		

=== Elections in the 1920s ===
General election 1929: Glasgow Gorbals
Party	Candidate	Votes	%	±%
Labour	George Buchanan	25,134	74.8	+8.9
Unionist	Maurice Bloch	8,457	25.2	−8.9
Majority		16,677	49.6	+17.8
Turnout		33,591	68.5	−4.5
Registered electors		49,004		
Labour hold		Swing	+8.9	

General election 1924: Glasgow Gorbals
Party	Candidate	Votes	%	±%
Labour	George Buchanan	19,480	65.9	−1.3
Unionist	Robert McLellan	10,092	34.1	+1.3
Majority		9,388	31.8	−2.6
Turnout		29,572	73.0	+9.5
Registered electors		40,483		
Labour hold		Swing	−1.3	

General election 1923: Glasgow Gorbals
Party	Candidate	Votes	%	±%
Labour	George Buchanan	17,211	67.2	+12.7
Unionist	Robert McLellan	8,392	32.8	New
Majority		8,819	34.4	+7.3
Turnout		25,603	63.5	−11.6
Registered electors		40,331		
Labour hold		Swing		

General election 1922: Glasgow Gorbals
Party	Candidate	Votes	%	±%
Labour	George Buchanan	16,478	54.5	+20.2
National Liberal	James Erskine Harper	8,276	27.4	N/A
Independent Communist	John Maclean	4,027	13.3	New
Liberal	Francis John Robertson	1,456	4.8	New
Majority		8,202	27.1	N/A
Turnout		30,237	75.1	+21.9
Registered electors		40,251		
Labour gain from Coalition Labour		Swing		

=== Elections in the 1910s ===
General election 1918: Glasgow Gorbals
Party	Candidate	Votes	%	±%
Coalition Labour	*George Barnes	14,247	65.7	
Labour	John Maclean	7,436	34.3	
Majority		6,811	31.4	
Turnout		21,683	53.2	
Registered electors		40,765		
Coalition Labour win (new seat)				

* Barnes did not receive the Coalition Coupon and was therefore an unofficial candidate.
