= Ernie Cant =

British communist activist (1890-1982)

Ernest Walter Cant (1890 – 1982) was a British communist activist.

== Biography ==
Born in Stoke Newington, Cant joined the Young Socialist League at age 15, and quickly became involved with the successful campaign against wage reductions at the Thames Iron Works. He was appointed as the organiser of the Young Socialist League in 1912, and then as the London organiser of its parent group, the British Socialist Party (BSP) in 1914. He was in the BSP's majority faction opposing British involvement in World War I, and wrote extensively in the party newspaper, The Call.

Due to his war opposition, Cant registered as a conscientious objector and was imprisoned in 1917. Two years later, with the war over, he commenced a hunger strike to protest his continued incarceration, and was soon released. He was then appointed the BSP's Scottish organiser and, in this role, participated in the discussions that formed the Communist Party of Great Britain (CPGB).

The CPGB appointed Cant as its first London District Organiser, although he left the position in mid-1925. Later in 1925, he was one of twelve CPGB leaders arrested on charges of disseminating seditious Communist literature, and encouraging others to violate the Incitement to Mutiny Act. He was imprisoned for six months. Upon his release, he relocated to South Wales, where he spoke in support of miners during their lock-out. He then moved to the Soviet Union, and worked for the International Class War Prisoners Aid Movement and for the Comintern.

Beginning in the early 1930s, Cant was the CPGB organiser in Nottingham, where he attempted to build support among miners, and was also active in the local co-operative movement. He was sacked from his CPGB post, but party leader Harry Pollitt intervened to help Cant find work with the Russian Oil Products company. Cant remained a CPGB member until his death in 1982.

Party political offices
Preceded by New position	London District Secretary of the Communist Party of Great Britain; 1920 – 1925	Succeeded by Robbie Robson
