= Robbie Robson (communist) =

British communist activist (1897–1973)

Robert William Robson (6 April 1897 – 1973), known as Robbie Robson, was a British communist activist. He was born in Guisborough to a working-class family. He served in the British Army during World War I, and was discharged in May 1919. When the Communist Party of Great Britain (CPGB) formed in 1920, he was a founding member.

In 1925, Robson's British passport was declared invalid for travel within the British Empire, but he nonetheless visited Australia in late 1927 on behalf of the Comintern. In that same year, he was appointed the CPGB's London District Organiser, and was elected to the party's Central Committee. In 1933 he moved to lead the party's Organisation Department. As such, he led recruitment of volunteers for the British Battalion in the Spanish Civil War. MI5 believed he was also involved in spying.

During World War II, Robson became ill with tuberculosis. He withdrew from political activity and moved to Timberscombe in Somerset, to recuperate. His wife, Eileen Potter, became interested in religion. MI5 tried to use the local vicar to get Robson to defect, but were unsuccessful.

Party political offices
Preceded by Ernie Cant	London District Secretary of the Communist Party of Great Britain; 1927–1933	Succeeded by Dave Springhall
Preceded by Idris Cox	National Organiser of the Communist Party of Great Britain; 1933–1940	Succeeded by Dave Springhall
