= Alice Cullen =

British politician (1891–1969)

Alice Cullen JP
- Cullen, c. 1950

Member of Parliament for Glasgow Gorbals
- In office 30 September 1948 – 31 May 1969
- Preceded by: George Buchanan
- Succeeded by: Frank McElhone

Personal details
- Born: Alice McLaughlin; 18 March 1891
- Died: 31 May 1969 (aged 78) Glasgow, Scotland
- Party: Labour
- Spouses: Harry Bartlett (m. 1914; died 1919); Pearce Cullen (m. 1920, died); William Reynolds (m. 1950; died 1961)
- Children: 2

Alice Cullen, JP (née McLaughlin; 18 March 1891 – 31 May 1969) was a Scottish Labour Party politician who was the member of parliament for Glasgow Gorbals from 1948 until her death. She was the first female Roman Catholic MP.

== Early life and family ==
Born Alice McLaughlin in 1891, she was educated at Lochwinnoch Elementary School. The Oxford Dictionary of National Biography says she was "probably" born in Lochwinnoch. She married Harry Bartlett in 1914, and they had a daughter. However, their marriage was brief, as he died in 1919. The following year, she married Pearce Cullen, and they had two daughters. After her second husband died, she was married to William Reynolds from 1950 until his death in 1961, but kept the surname Cullen.

During her first marriage, she moved to Hutchesontown in Glasgow. She joined the Independent Labour Party in 1916.

== Political career ==
Cullen was a member of Glasgow Corporation from 1935 until 1945, and became a justice of the peace in 1941. She was elected to the House of Commons as the member of parliament for the constituency of Glasgow Gorbals, which was safe for Labour, at a by-election in 1948. She competed with three men to secure the position, which was vacated due to the resignation of the previous MP, George Buchanan, who assumed the position of Chairman of the National Assistance Board.

She remained MP for the rest of her life, and was particularly noted for her dedication to housing and welfare issues. She was MP for Glasgow Gorbals at the time of "The Gorbals Vampire" incident in September 1954 when hundreds of schoolchildren went searching the Southern Necropolis cemetery armed with stakes to find a vampire with iron teeth. She led the city council in blaming horror comics and films for the incident. This resulted to a call for the ban of American horror comics to minors which she supported, along with all the other Glasgow MPs.

A play loosely based on this incident, The Gorbals Vampire, was performed at the Citizens Theatre in Glasgow in October 2016.

== Death ==
Cullen died from a heart attack at her home in Springburn, Glasgow, on 31 May 1969, at the age of 78.

Parliament of the United Kingdom
Preceded by George Buchanan	Member of Parliament for Glasgow Gorbals; 1948–1969	Succeeded by Frank McElhone
