= Rose Kerrigan =

British activist (1903–1995)

- Rose Kerrigan c. 1925. Image from Spartacus Educational.
- Born: 11 February 1903; Dublin, Ireland
- Died: 10 July 1995 (aged 92); London, England
- Known for: Scottish communist

Rose Kerrigan (née Klasko) was a member of the Communist Party of Great Britain.

== Early life ==
Rose Klasko was born in Dublin, Ireland in 1903. Her Jewish parents were born in Russia, and moved to Glasgow via Dublin. She was one of five children and had a large extended family that had settled in Glasgow. Her father worked as a tailor and had socialist, anti-war, political views. He supported the cause of the Suffragettes.

Rose attended the Stow Practice Normal School, which was on the site of the old Stow College in Cowcaddens, Glasgow. She then attended the Hebrew School in Garnethill. She attended the Socialist Sunday School in Glasgow and was involved in the Glasgow rent strikes 1915. She was involved in the anti-war movement in World War I and World War II, and was sacked from her first job for speaking out against the war. She was influenced by many activists during her political life, including James Maxton, Philip Snowden, Ethel Snowden, Thomas Hastie Bell, and Helen Crawfurd. She was also an active Trade Unionist and had served her apprenticeship in activism throughout the Red Clydeside movement.

== Later life ==
Rose joined the Communist Party of Great Britain in 1923. She married Peter Kerrigan, an engineering worker, who was also a member, in 1926. He helped to lead the General Strike in Glasgow. Her husband was a representative to the Comintern, and became a political commissar during the Spanish Civil War. Rose raised money for the cause.

Her campaign continued throughout her life, she fought for Nuclear Disarmament. She still fought for the rights of individuals even throughout her retirement, in particular that of old age pensioners.
