= Peter Kerrigan =

British communism activist

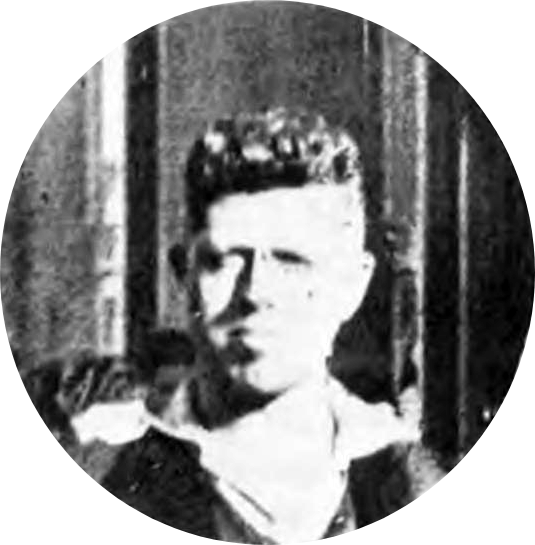
Kerrigan c. 1938

Peter Kerrigan (26 June 1899 – 15 December 1977) was a communist activist in Britain.

== Early years ==
Born in the Hutchesontown area of Glasgow, Kerrigan was apprenticed on the railways before serving in the Royal Scots from 1918 until 1920. He joined the Communist Party of Great Britain (CPGB) in 1921, but left in 1922 after the party declined to oppose Labour Party candidates in the general election.

Kerrigan rejoined the CPGB in 1924 and also became active in the Amalgamated Engineering Union (AEU), achieving particular prominence during the British General Strike. He married fellow communist Rose Klasko in 1926. He attended the Third Congress of the Red International of Labour Unions and the Fifth Congress of the Comintern and in 1927 was elected to the Executive of the CPGB.

In 1929, Kerrigan attended the Lenin School in Moscow, and the following year, he was appointed the CPGB's Scottish Organiser. He was active in organising anti-unemployment marches and supporting Willie Gallacher's successful Parliament candidacy in West Fife. In 1935, he became the CPGB's representative to the Comintern.

== Spanish Civil War ==
During the Spanish Civil War he served as commissar for English-speaking volunteers in the International Brigade, then later as the Spanish correspondent of the Daily Worker. He took part in the Battle of Lopera, the Battle of Jarama and the Battle of the Ebro.

From 1939 until 1942 Kerrigan served as the CPGB's industrial organiser, then national organiser from 1943 to 1951. He stood for Parliament at Glasgow Shettleston in 1945 and in the Glasgow Gorbals from 1948 onwards, but was unsuccessful on all occasions.

Kerrigan became the CPGB's national industrial organiser again in 1951, holding the post until 1965. In 1957, he acted as returning officer in a hotly disputed Electrical Trades Union election involving a CPGB member. This resulted in party members being found guilty of conspiracy and fraud, and after a further incident in 1964, he stepped down from the party executive.

== Later life and death ==
After the death of Francisco Franco, Kerrigan worked to raise money for the previously underground communist newspaper Mundo Obrera.

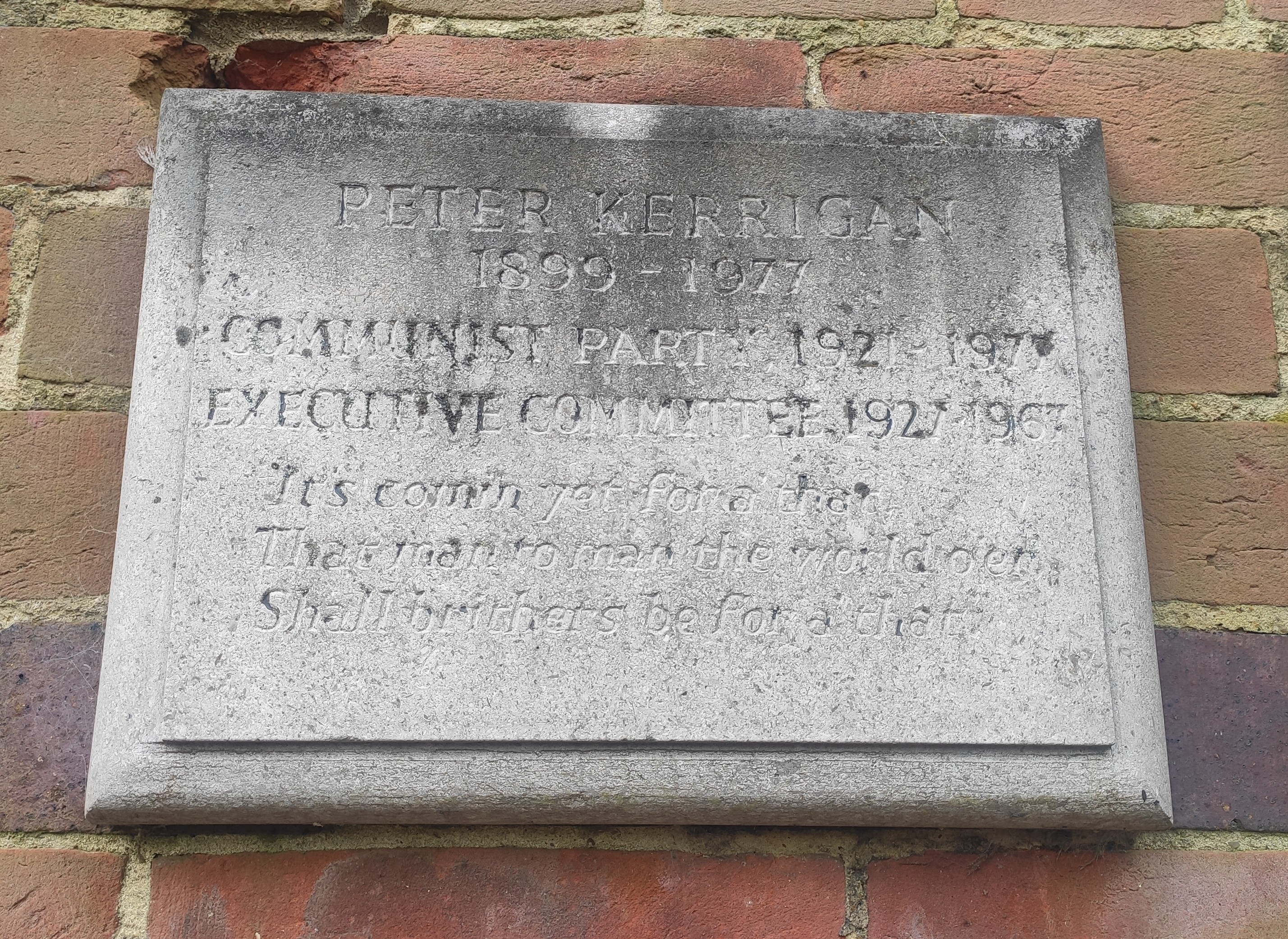
Plaque dedicated to Kerrigan at Golders Green Crematorium

Kerrigan died in 1977 at the age of 78. He was cremated at Golders Green Crematorium.

Party political offices
Preceded by Dave Springhall	National Organiser of the Communist Party of Great Britain; 1943 - 1951	Succeeded by Mick Bennett
Preceded by George Allison	National Industrial Organiser of the Communist Party of Great Britain; 1951–1966	Succeeded by Bert Ramelson
