= Workers Party of Scotland =

Defunct Scottish political party

The Workers Party of Scotland or Workers Party of Scotland (Marxist-Leninist) was a small anti-revisionist Marxist-Leninist political party formed in 1966 and based in Scotland.

== History ==
The Workers Party of Scotland (Marxist-Leninist) was formed in October 1966, by seven members of the Scottish branch of the Committee to Defeat Revisionism, for Communist Unity, including party chairman Tom Murray, a veteran of the International Brigades. The party campaigned for Scottish independence and took part in elections, including the 1969 Gorbals by-election, when they came last behind the Communist Party. They published a long-term journal Scottish Vanguard and others including Red Clydesider and Dundee and Tayside Vanguard. Membership of the party declined in the course of the late 70s and the group became moribund with the death of Tom Murray in 1983.

In 1972, founder and Gorbals electoral candidate Matt Lygate and fellow WPS(ML) member Colin Lawson were convicted (along with two non-members) for armed robbery of the Royal Bank of Scotland, having been arrested the previous year following a tip off. The WPS (ML) released a statement that Lygate's group acted without authorisation although their purported aim had been to raise money for party funds. Lygate received the longest prison sentence in Scottish legal history for a non-violent crime, receiving 24 years and serving 11. They were originally to be prosecuted for treason, the first case since John Maclean, but the charges were later dropped to bank robbery.

After Lygate's release from prison, he appeared in Glasgow to announce the relaunch of the party as the Workers Party of Scotland, stating that there were now 30 to 40 members. They produced leaflets against the poll tax.
