= Bob Cooney (activist) =

Scottish communist activist (1907–1984)

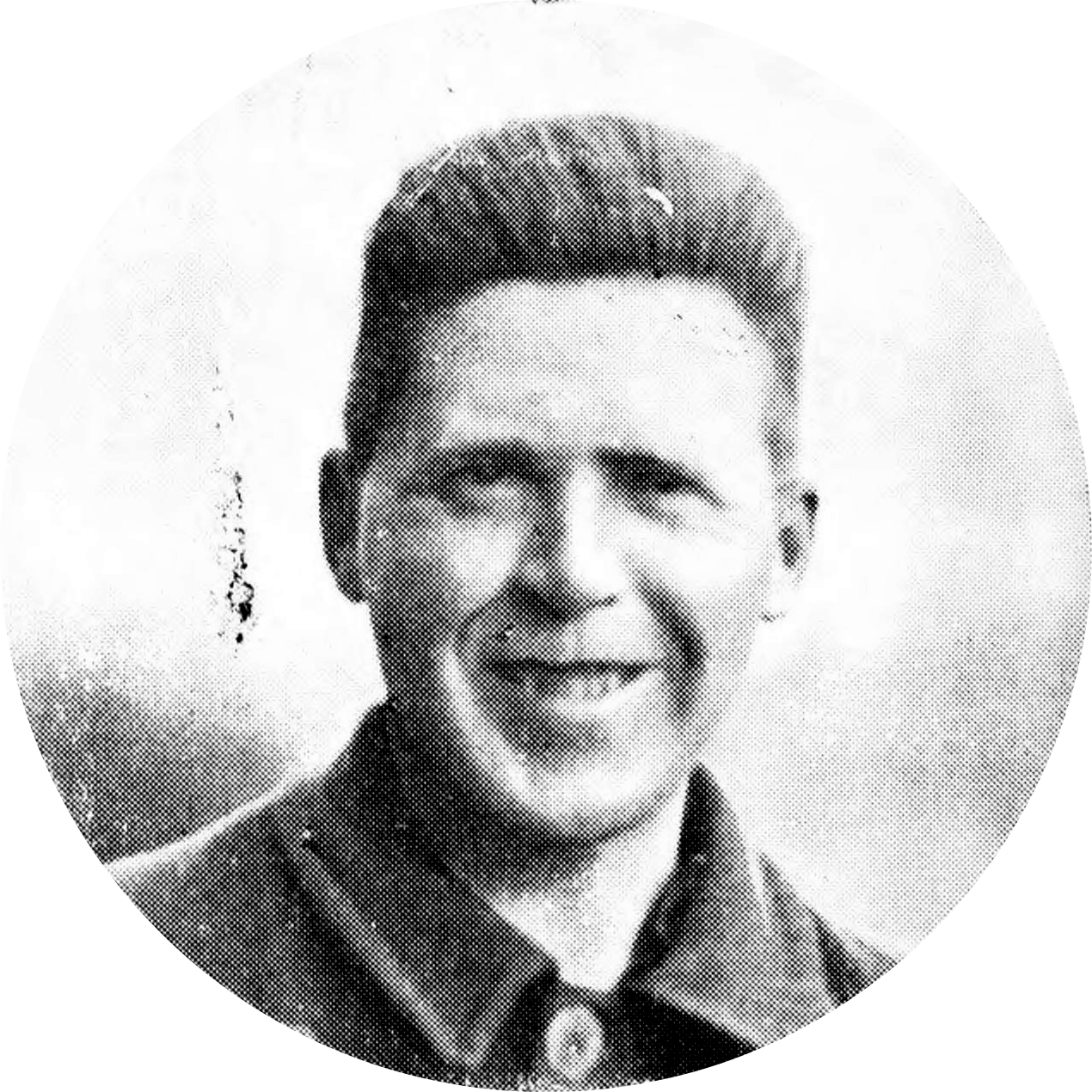
Cooney in Spain c. 1938

Robert Hunt Cooney (November 1907 (Note: There are contradictory reports on his date of birth: 12 November 1907; or 19 November 1907) – 15 August 1984) was a Scottish communist activist, political commissar and poet.

== Biography ==
Robert Hunt Cooney was born in Sunderland in November 1907 to Sandy, a barrel maker, and Jean, a former cotton spinner, and moved to Aberdeen shortly afterwards following his father's death in 1909. He later worked as a clerk in a pawn shop.

He joined the Communist Party of Great Britain in 1928. and regularly engaged in counterprotests against fascist rallies, including by the British Union of Fascists. Following an arrest for one of these demonstrations, for which he was sent to Craiginches Prison, he fought for the International Brigades in the Spanish Civil War and became a political commissar of the British Battalion.

He stood for Glasgow Central in the 1945 general election, finishing third out of four candidates with 2,709 votes, representing 12.7% of votes cast. He was also a candidate in the 1950 general election for Aberdeen North, finishing last of four candidates with 1,391 votes, 2.7% of the total.

In 1955, he moved to Birmingham, following difficulties finding employment in Aberdeen, and worked as a heavy equipment operator. During this time, he lived with Ian Campbell's family and was a member of the Amalgamated Engineering Union. Upon retiring in 1973, he returned to Aberdeen.

In 1982, Cooney published a poetry collection, When of Heroes We Sing, consisting of songs and poems he had written throughout his life. On the subject, he said "I've always been interested in folk singing. A lot of the old songs are stories of the working people over the ages".

== Death and legacy ==
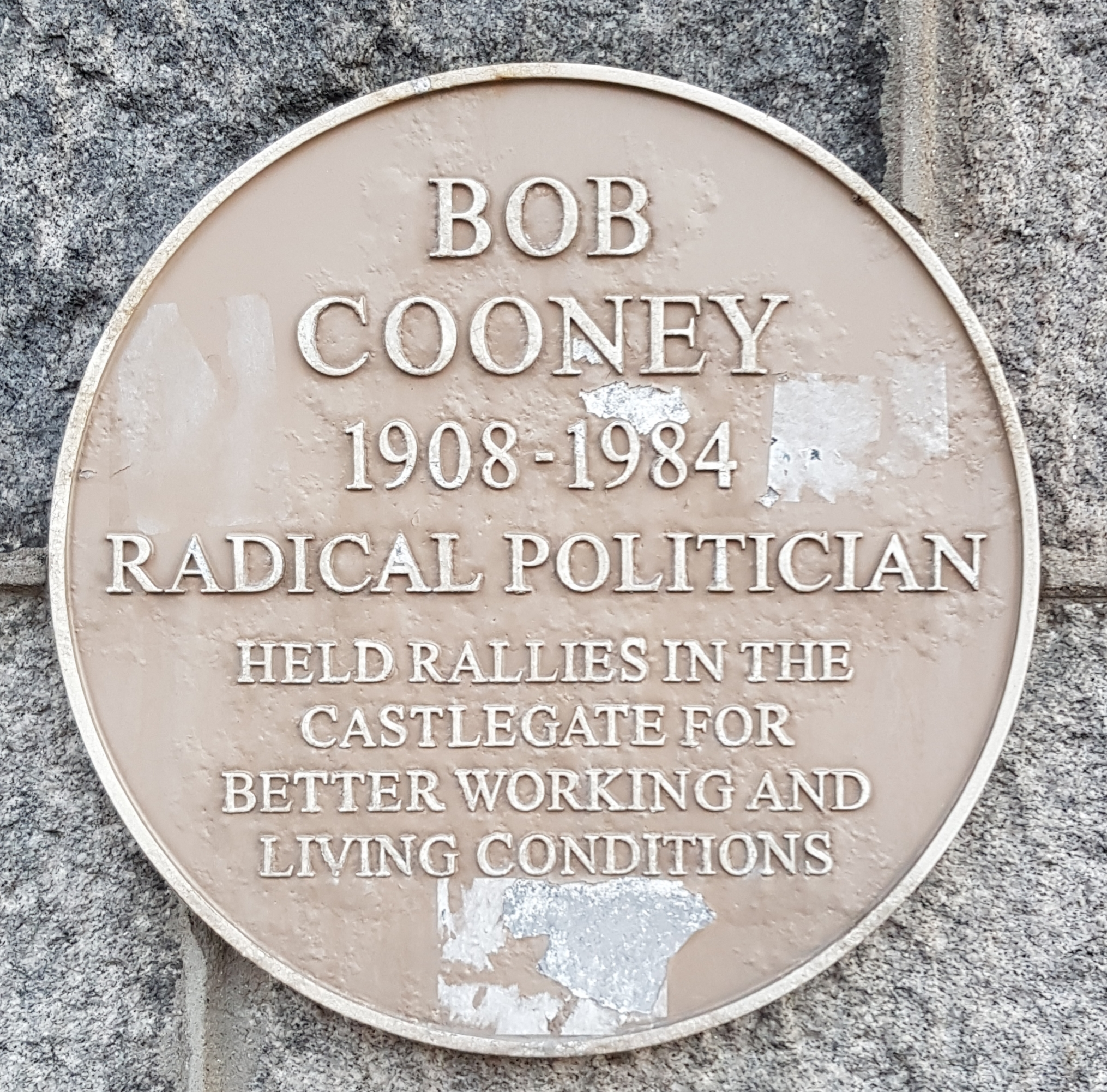
Commemorative plaque

Bob Cooney died in Aberdeen on 15 August 1984 at the age of 76. and a concert was held in his honour at Aberdeen Arts Centre on 16 August 1986, with Ian Campbell and Dick Gaughan among the performers. In 1997, the residential area Bob Cooney Court in Berryden was named in his honour. and, in 2005, a plaque dedicated to him was installed in Castlegate. A posthumous autobiography, Proud Journey: a Spanish Civil War memoir, was published by the Marx Memorial Library in October 2015.

== Awards ==
He was awarded the Hans Beimler Medal in July 1966 for his role in the Spanish Civil War.

== Bibliography ==
- When of Heroes We Sing. Aberdeen Folk Song Club. 1982
- Proud Journey: a Spanish Civil War memoir. Marx Memorial Library. 2015
