= 1948 Glasgow Gorbals by-election =

UK parliamentary by-election

A 1948 by-election for the constituency of Glasgow Gorbals in the United Kingdom House of Commons was held on 30 September 1948, caused by the appointment as Chair of the National Assistance Board of the incumbent Labour MP George Buchanan. The result was a hold for the Labour Party, with their candidate Alice Cullen.

== Result ==
Glasgow Gorbals 1948 by-election
Party	Candidate	Votes	%	±%
Labour	Alice Cullen	13,706	54.6	−25.4
Unionist	W. Roxburgh	7,181	28.6	+8.6
Communist	Peter Kerrigan	4,233	16.8	New
Majority		6,525	26.0	−34.0
Turnout		25,120		
Labour hold		Swing	+17.0	

== Previous election ==
General election 1945: Glasgow Gorbals
Party	Candidate	Votes	%	±%
Labour	George Buchanan	21,073	80.0	+74.1
Unionist	A Mactaggart	5,269	20.0	+9.9
Majority		15,804	60.0	N/A
Turnout		26,342	56.9	
Labour hold		Swing		
