= Sid French =

General Secretary of the New Communist Party of Britain
- In office 1977–1979
- Preceded by: post created
- Succeeded by: Eric Trevett

Surrey District Secretary of the Communist Party of Great Britain
- In office 1950–1977
- Preceded by: post created

London District Treasurer of the Communist Party of Great Britain
- In office 1946–1950

Personal details
- Born: 1920 London, United Kingdom
- Died: 1979 (aged 58–59) London, United Kingdom
- Party: CPGB (1934–77); New Communist Party (since 1977)
- Spouse: Ruth Harris

Sid French (1920–1979) was a British communist activist and organiser, former Surrey district secretary of the Communist Party of Great Britain (CPGB) and the founding general secretary of the New Communist Party of Britain.

== Early years ==
Sid French in his youth

He was born in 1920, to Ernie French, an active communist, and Ethel Wilkinson, from a family with left-wing views. Sid's sister, Doris, joined the CPGB in 1942, but had been politically active with communists in the 1930s.

French joined the Young Communist League at the age of 14. He first worked in an accountant's office and then as a reporter for the South London Press.

== Military service ==
In 1941, during World War II, he was called up and served in the Royal Air Force. Promoted to Sergeant in 1942, French was posted to Gibraltar and later to North Africa and Italy. While on active service French wrote an article for Labour Monthly about the problems facing the Gibraltarians under war conditions. In Algiers he met Henri Alleg, a French communist journalist, who later joined the Algerian resistance against French colonialism and spent five years in prison for his activities.

== Full-time CPGB official ==
In 1946, he was appointed to be what was then the full-time post of treasurer of the London District of the Communist Party of Great Britain. In 1950, he was appointed secretary of the newly formed Surrey District Committee of the CPGB in 1950. He remained in that position for more than twenty five years until he resigned, together with other supporters, to establish the New Communist Party on 15 July 1977.

Despite the later characterisation of him by detractors as being an unflinching Stalinist, French was actually long known to be critical of personality cults – especially those involving himself. For example, he opposed the sending of a special message and gift to Joseph Stalin on his 70th birthday.

== Differences with CPGB ==
He was a disciplined communist and often subordinated his views to those of the party. For example, despite the fact that he privately had serious doubts about the electoral strategy of the CPGB he stood as a candidate in the Mitcham constituency five times, the last being in 1974. Related to this concern, was his long-standing criticism of the downgrading of the CPGB's policy of support for the Labour Party. He was also member of the Political Purposes Committee of the Royal Arsenal Co-operative Society for many years and, for a while, even the vice-chair, a unique position to be in for a Labour Party-affiliated mass organisation.

French's critical eye had begun early on in his full-time career and appeared to be a feature throughout his time as a CPGB full-time official. Although many shared his concerns, including the CPGB's own later leadership, he had been an early and vocal critic, within the confines of internal discussion, of the CPGB's immediate post-war shift away from organising workplace branches. Whilst twenty years later, he was one of those firmly opposed to changing the name of the Daily Worker to The Morning Star in 1966.

It might be thought that French and the Communist Party had moved a considerable way from each other over those two decades. Yet, although it is possible to discern a cumulative build-up of views held by French that significantly distanced him from the mainstream within the Communist Party from at least around 1962, it would take another 15 years for this to formally take the form of an organisational breach.

It might be thought that his role as the lead political worker in the Surrey District of the CPGB clearly enabled him to maintain a semi-detached position within it. Yet, in many ways, he had seemed at odds with the CPGB's strategic plan, the British Road to Socialism, ever since it had been first adopted in 1950.

== Heading toward the split ==
Sid French as CPGB Surrey District Secretary

From the 1968 Soviet invasion of Czechoslovakia, and the resulting schism in the CPGB, Sid French clearly saw the New Communist Party (NCP) project in the same light as the Bolsheviks and Mensheviks split within the Russian Social Democratic and Labour Party. His Surrey District began to operate as a factional entity within the Young Communist League, which was much more destabilised by differences over the events in Czechoslovakia in 1968 than the CPGB.

The intensity of conflict within the YCL was much fuelled by the flagrantly hostile attitudes of the bulk of its national leadership. The fact that much of this leadership delighted in anti-Soviet rhetoric contrasted starkly with French and those around him who were especially associated with a relatively uncritical stance regarding the Soviet Union and its policies.

By the end of the 1970s, French's Surrey district won supporters in a few parts of the country to its view that the CPGB had abandoned a principled Leninist view. During the inner-party discussion on the 1977 draft of the British Road to Socialism, French was especially sharply critical of the new text. This dropped the term 'dictatorship of the proletariat', accepted a seemingly gradualist approach to the achievement of socialism and gave a commitment to always honour the verdict of the electorate, even to the extent of a socialist government standing down if it failed to achieve a renewed mandate.

== Foundation of the New Communist Party ==
Ruth Harris, wife of Sid French

The Surrey District took the adoption of the programme as a signal for a breakaway, which had been mooted to have the sympathy of several thousand CPGB members, although only several hundred in actuality joined the New Communist Party of Britain (NCP) when it was founded on 15 July 1977.

It was clearly a personal achievement of sorts for French, though others would point to the manner in which Marxist thinkers in the CPGB and YCL now began to be targeted heavily by Eurocommunists. Within a mere three to four years a virtually open war had begun inside the CPGB, in which the particular stance of the NCP appeared not so relevant as the CPGB imploded.

== Personal life ==
In 1953, he married Dr Ruth Harris, a Jewish working-class woman who rose to be a consultant paediatrician. She died in 1980. They had two children, Jean and John. French was also an avid cricket fan and regularly attended matches at The Oval.
