= Margaret Hunter =

Scottish communist activist and trade unionist

- Born: Margaret Anderson; 11 November 1922; Bridgeton, Glasgow
- Died: 21 February 1986 (aged 63); London
- Known for: Communist activism and trade unionism

Margaret Annie Hunter (born Anderson; 11 November 1922 – 21 February 1986) was a Scottish communist activist and trade unionist who is known for playing an active role in the Communist Party of Great Britain from the 1940s until her retirement in the early 1970s and eventual death in 1986.

== Personal life ==
Hunter was born in Bridgeton, Glasgow to mother Margaret Rippey and father James Anderson, who was a milk salesman. She grew up in Polmadie as the youngest of five children, attending Queen's Park Secondary School. Her first job was working as a typist for the British Oxygen Company, before later working at Barr and Stroud, where she met fellow communist James Hunter, whom she married in 1946.

== Political activism ==
Hunter joined the CPGB's youth wing, the Young Communist League, in 1937 at the age of 14, before joining the CPGB in 1940. Not long after, while she was the T&G trade union's factory convener at Barr and Stroud, Hunter became secretary of the CPGB's Knightswood branch. She went on to become a full-time party secretary in Glasgow and ran in local elections in Dalmarnock in 1947 and 1949.

In 1958, Hunter become the party's Scottish organiser, part of the Scottish secretariat. She played a key role in organising the CPGB's 1958 celebrations to mark the bicentenary of Robert Burns' birth. When Helen Crawfurd Anderson died in 1954, Hunter made an oration at her funeral, at which she said the international socialist movement had lost "one of its finest representatives".

She ran for election to the UK Parliament in the Glasgow Gorbals constituency in 1964 (1,339 votes; 5.6%) and 1966 (819 votes; 4.1%).

In 1963, she relocated from Glasgow to London to work as the party's national women's officer, which saw her continue to sit on the CPGB's Executive Committee, while also co-ordinating the work of the national Women's Advisory Committee (WAC).

== Death ==
Hunter became unwell while taking part in a political delegation to East Germany in the early 1970s, which led her to retire from political activism. She continued to live in London until her death in 1986.

Party political offices
Preceded by ?	National Women's Officer of the Communist Party of Great Britain; 1963–1972	Succeeded by Jean Styles
