= Finlay Hart =

Scottish politician (1901–1989)

Finlay Hart (1901 – 27 December 1989) was a Scottish communist activist and politician. He served twice as a communist councillor in Clydebank, from 1935-38 and 1965-70.

Hart was born in Clydebank in 1901 and attended Clydebank High School. His political activism began when he joined the Workers International Industrial Union in 1915 while employed in Dalmuir at the William Beardmore and Company shipyard. In 1917 he participated in the Red Clydeside movement and joined the Socialist Labour Party; he was part of its majority that founded the Communist Party of Great Britain (CPGB). In 1923 he emigrated to Edmonton in Canada in an attempt to find work. While there he became a member of the Communist Party of Canada, but then returned to Clydebank in 1926, where he worked as a plumber.

In 1934, Hart helped lead a Glasgow-to-London hunger march. The following year, he was elected as Clydebank's first communist councillor, and remained in office until 1938. Besides sitting on the CPGB Central Committee from 1935 to 1943, Hart held District Secretary posts for the Party: in Scotland in 1935, in the North Midlands from 1939 to 1940, and in South Yorkshire from 1940 to 1942. In 1935 he was a delegate to the 7th World Congress of the Communist International in Moscow.

After World War II, Hart was chairman of the shipbuilding shop stewards at the Blythswood Shipyard in Scotstoun. He was an early advocate for merging the boilermaker, shipwright, and blacksmith unions into a consolidated labour federation, which became the Amalgamated Society of Boilermakers, Shipwrights, Blacksmiths and Structural Workers.

Hart stood for Parliament on three occasions: West Dunbartonshire in 1950; Glasgow Springburn in 1955 and again in 1959, but he was never elected. During the 1950s, he served as Chairman of the Scottish Committee of the CPGB. He retired from his Party posts in 1963.

After an absence of thirty years, he was elected again as Clydebank's communist councillor in 1965, and was also elected to the Dunbartonshire County Council. He later became Provost of Clydebank. In the early 1970s after the collapse of the Upper Clyde Shipbuilders company, he helped organize a "work-in" action.

On 27 December 1989, Finlay Hart died of a stroke at Gartnavel General Hospital in Glasgow's West End. He was 88.
