= Ted Bramley =

British communist activist (1905–1989)

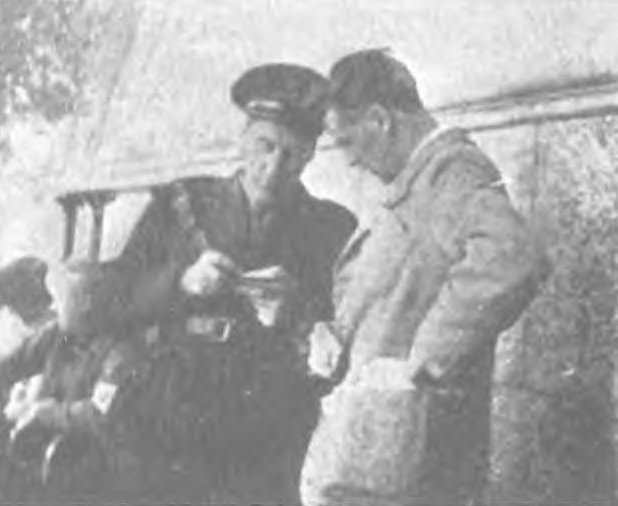
Bramley (right) with Commissar George Aitken in Spain, 1937

Edward F. Bramley (17 June 1905 – 25 February 1989) was a British communist activist.

== Biography ==
Born in Westminster, Edward Bramley went by the name "Ted". While still young, he moved with his family to Detroit, but they returned to London during World War I. He became an engineer and joined the Amalgamated Engineering Union.

Bramley's father was a member of the Social Democratic Federation and the Industrial Workers of the World. Ted joined the Communist Party of Great Britain (CPGB) in 1927. He steadily rose through the ranks, joining the London District Committee in 1932. He attended a Communist International meeting the next year. He stood in Hammersmith North at the 1931 general election, and again in a 1934 by-election, but did not come close to winning.

Bramley wished to fight in the Spanish Civil War, but the CPGB refused him permission to do so, preferring him to remain in the UK, and appointing him as London District Secretary in 1937. He again hoped to enlist during World War II, but was rejected because he had contracted tuberculosis in the 1930s. Instead, he focused on his Party work, leading a movement to occupy London Underground stations during bombing raids. This effort contributed to his election in 1946 to the London County Council in Mile End. He served alongside fellow communist Jack Gaster.

While a councillor, Bramley led a movement to occupy empty luxury flats, in order to house returning service personnel. He was charged with conspiracy, and received a suspended sentence. Facing illness, he resigned as London District Secretary in 1947, but continued to stand in elections, failing to hold his council seat in 1949, then standing unsuccessfully in Stepney at the 1951 general election.

Around this time, Bramley retired to Hertfordshire and tried his hand at farming. He started writing about agricultural questions for the Daily Worker.

== Personal life ==
Bramley married Margaret Ogilvie (1917–2002) in 1939. He met her while recovering from his bout with tuberculosis. They had three children; Ian (1943), Richard (1947) and Glen (1949).

Ted Bramley died on 25 February 1989. He was 83 years old.

Party political offices
Preceded by Dave Springhall	London District Secretary of the Communist Party of Great Britain; 1937–1947	Succeeded by John Mahon
