= Nottingham North =

Parliamentary constituency in the United Kingdom, 1955-2024

Coordinates: 53.00°N 1.19°W

- Former borough constituency for the House of Commons
- Boundary of Nottingham North in Nottinghamshire

- Location of Nottinghamshire within England
- County: Nottinghamshire
- Electorate: 64,578 (December 2010)
- Major settlements: Bulwell

1955–2024
- Created from: Nottingham East, Nottingham West and Broxtowe
- Replaced by: Nottingham North and Kimberley

Nottingham North was a constituency (Note: A borough constituency (for the purposes of election expenses and type of returning officer)) represented in the House of Commons of the UK Parliament. (Note: As with all constituencies, the constituency elects one Member of Parliament (MP) by the first past the post system of election at least every five years.)

Under the 2023 Periodic Review of Westminster constituencies, the constituency was abolished. Subject to major boundary changes – including gaining the communities of Kimberley and Nuthall in the Borough of Broxtowe, the Nottingham City ward of Leen Valley ward from Nottingham South, and losing Bilborough ward in exchange – it was reformed as Nottingham North and Kimberley, which was first contested in the 2024 general election.

== Constituency profile ==
The constituency consisted mostly of residential areas, a majority of neighbourhoods of which were council housing. Of these a slight majority, rather than being social housing, is now private under the Right to Buy, such as Bulwell. Overall, its census Super Output Areas have the lowest income of the three Nottingham constituencies, and was the city's safest seat for the Labour Party, though 2017 and 2019 saw considerable increases in the Conservative vote, in line with other Leave and heavily working-class areas, making this seat Nottingham's most marginal for Labour. Male unemployment in 2010 was significantly higher than female unemployment in this constituency, which had the highest overall percentage of claimants in the county of Nottinghamshire, slightly more than Nottingham East.

Causes of Unemployment

The decline of coal mining and the textile industry in the area in 1970–2000 brought the highest unemployment in the county to Nottingham North, with a peak of 12.8% of its residents being registered unemployed in 2009.

== Boundaries ==
Map of boundaries 2010-2024

1955–1974: The County Borough of Nottingham wards of Byron, Mapperley, Portland, and St Albans, and the Urban District of Hucknall.

1974–1983: The County Borough of Nottingham wards of Byron, Forest, Mapperley, Portland, Radford, and St Albans.

1983–2010: The City of Nottingham wards of Aspley, Beechdale, Bestwood Park, Bilborough, Bulwell East, Bulwell West, Byron, Portland, and Strelley.

2010–2024: The City of Nottingham wards of Aspley, Basford, Bestwood, Bilborough, Bulwell, and Bulwell Forest.

== History ==
The constituency was created in 1955 and elected Labour candidates as MPs until Richard Ottaway (Note: MP for Croydon South 1992–2015) surprisingly gained it for the Conservative Party in their landslide victory of 1983, before narrowly losing in 1987 to Graham Allen, for Labour, who held it until 2017 when he stood down after 30 years of service. Alex Norris then won the seat for Labour in the 2017 general election.

== Members of Parliament ==
Election	Member	Party
1955	James Harrison	Labour
1959	Bill Whitlock	Labour
1983	Richard Ottaway	Conservative
1987	Graham Allen	Labour
2017	Alex Norris	Labour Co-op

== Elections ==
Election results for Nottingham North

=== Elections in the 2010s ===
General election 2019: Nottingham North
Party	Candidate	Votes	%	±%
Labour Co-op	Alex Norris	17,337	49.1	−11.1
Conservative	Stuart Bestwick	12,847	36.4	+5.3
Brexit Party	Julian Carter	2,686	7.6	New
Liberal Democrats	Christina Morgan-Danvers	1,582	4.5	+2.7
Green	Andrew Jones	868	2.5	+1.1
Majority		4,490	12.7	−16.4
Turnout		35,320	53.1	−4.2
Labour Co-op hold		Swing	-8.2	

General election 2017: Nottingham North
Party	Candidate	Votes	%	±%
Labour Co-op	Alex Norris	23,067	60.2	+5.6
Conservative	Jack Tinley	11,907	31.1	+10.1
UKIP	Stephen Crosby	2,133	5.6	−12.9
Liberal Democrats	Tadeusz Jones	674	1.8	−0.6
Green	Kirsty Jones	538	1.4	−1.7
Majority		11,160	29.1	−4.5
Turnout		38,319	57.3	+3.7
Labour Co-op hold		Swing	-2.3	

General election 2015: Nottingham North
Party	Candidate	Votes	%	±%
Labour	Graham Allen	19,283	54.6	+6.0
Conservative	Louise Burfitt-Dons	7,423	21.0	−3.8
UKIP	Stephen Crosby	6,542	18.5	+14.6
Green	Katharina Boettge	1,088	3.1	New
Liberal Democrats	Tony Sutton	847	2.4	−14.7
TUSC	Cathy Meadows	160	0.5	New
Majority		11,860	33.6	+9.8
Turnout		35,343	53.6	−0.6
Labour hold		Swing	+4.9	

Class War Party originally announced Ben Turff as candidate, but he failed to stand.

General election 2010: Nottingham North
Party	Candidate	Votes	%	±%
Labour	Graham Allen	16,648	48.6	−10.6
Conservative	Martin Curtis	8,508	24.8	+6.7
Liberal Democrats	Tim Ball	5,849	17.1	−0.3
BNP	Simon Brindley	1,944	5.7	New
UKIP	Irenea Marriott	1,338	3.9	−1.5
Majority		8,138	23.8	−17.3
Turnout		34,285	54.2	+5.8
Labour hold		Swing	−8.7	

=== Elections in the 2000s ===
General election 2005: Nottingham North
Party	Candidate	Votes	%	±%
Labour	Graham Allen	17,842	58.7	−5.8
Conservative	Priti Patel	5,671	18.7	−5.1
Liberal Democrats	Tim Ball	5,190	17.1	+6.5
UKIP	Irena Marriott	1,680	5.5	New
Majority		12,171	40.0	−0.7
Turnout		30,383	49.1	+2.4
Labour hold		Swing	−0.3	

General election 2001: Nottingham North
Party	Candidate	Votes	%	±%
Labour	Graham Allen	19,392	64.5	−1.2
Conservative	Martin Wright	7,152	23.8	+3.5
Liberal Democrats	Rob Lee	3,177	10.6	+2.6
Socialist Labour	Andrew Botham	321	1.1	New
Majority		12,240	40.7	−4.7
Turnout		30,042	46.7	−16.3
Labour hold		Swing	−2.3	

=== Elections in the 1990s ===
General election 1997: Nottingham North
Party	Candidate	Votes	%	±%
Labour	Graham Allen	27,203	65.7	+10.0
Conservative	Gillian Shaw	8,402	20.3	−14.8
Liberal Democrats	Rachel Oliver	3,301	8.0	−0.6
Referendum	Joe Neal	1,858	4.5	New
Socialist	Andy Belfield	637	1.5	New
Majority		18,801	45.4	+24.8
Turnout		41,401	63.0	−12.0
Labour hold		Swing		

General election 1992: Nottingham North
Party	Candidate	Votes	%	±%
Labour	Graham Allen	29,052	55.7	+10.8
Conservative	Ian G. Bridge	18,309	35.1	−6.5
Liberal Democrats	Anthony Skelton	4,477	8.6	−3.1
Natural Law	Alwyn C. Cadman	274	0.5	New
Majority		10,743	20.6	+17.3
Turnout		52,112	75.0	+2.4
Labour hold		Swing	+8.7	

=== Elections in the 1980s ===
General election 1987: Nottingham North
Party	Candidate	Votes	%	±%
Labour	Graham Allen	22,713	44.9	+6.2
Conservative	Richard Ottaway	21,048	41.6	+2.2
Alliance	Sumal Fernando	5,912	11.7	−7.7
Communist	John Peck	879	1.7	−0.8
Majority		1,665	3.3	N/A
Turnout		69,620	72.6	+6.5
Labour gain from Conservative		Swing	+2.0	

General election 1983: Nottingham North
Party	Candidate	Votes	%	±%
Conservative	Richard Ottaway	18,730	39.5	−1.7
Labour	William Whitlock	18,368	38.7	−8.2
Alliance	Leighton Williams	9,200	19.4	+10.2
Communist	John Peck	1,184	2.5	+0.5
Majority		362	0.8	N/A
Turnout		71,807	66.1	−1.5
Conservative gain from Labour		Swing	+3.3	

=== Elections in the 1970s ===
General election 1979: Nottingham North
Party	Candidate	Votes	%	±%
Labour	William Whitlock	25,028	46.86	−1.24
Conservative	P Waine	21,956	41.11	+6.33
Liberal	J Stockley	4,900	9.17	−5.38
Communist	John Peck	1,071	2.01	+0.99
National Front	R Pratt	454	0.85	−0.69
Majority		3,072	5.75	
Turnout		78,996	67.61	
Labour hold		Swing	-3.79	

General election October 1974: Nottingham North
Party	Candidate	Votes	%	±%
Labour	William Whitlock	24,694	48.10	
Conservative	M F Spungin	17,853	34.78	
Liberal	M Crew-Gee	7,470	14.55	
National Front	D Caine	792	1.54	New
Communist	John Peck	525	1.02	
Majority		6,841	13.32	
Turnout		76,490	67.11	
Labour hold		Swing		

General election February 1974: Nottingham North (new boundaries)
Party	Candidate	Votes	%	±%
Labour	William Whitlock	25,435	44.78	
Conservative	M F Spungin	20,990	36.95	
Liberal	P Edwards	9,623	16.94	
Communist	John Peck	754	1.33	
Majority		4,445	7.83	
Turnout		75,866	74.87	
Labour win (new boundaries)				

(Boundary changes for 1974)

General election 1970: Nottingham North
Party	Candidate	Votes	%	±%
Labour	William Whitlock	25,898	52.83	
Conservative	William Derbyshire	18,616	37.98	
Liberal	Peggy Edwards	3,763	7.68	New
Communist	John Peck	741	1.51	
Majority		7,282	14.85	
Turnout		70,672	69.36	
Labour hold		Swing		

=== Elections in the 1960s ===
General election 1966: Nottingham North
Party	Candidate	Votes	%	±%
Labour	William Whitlock	30,260	60.62	
Conservative	Jeffery Nicholas Lewis Tillett	18,590	37.24	
Communist	John Peck	1,070	2.14	
Majority		11,670	23.38	
Turnout		67,321	74.15	
Labour hold		Swing		

General election 1964: Nottingham North
Party	Candidate	Votes	%	±%
Labour	William Whitlock	29,535	57.14	
Conservative	Peter Fry	20,578	39.81	
Communist	John Peck	1,579	3.05	
Majority		8,957	17.33	
Turnout		66,477	77.76	
Labour hold		Swing		

=== Elections in the 1950s ===
General election 1959: Nottingham North
Party	Candidate	Votes	%	±%
Labour	William Whitlock	24,005	47.19	
Conservative	Alan G Blake	18,952	37.26	
Liberal	Stanley Thomas	6,581	12.94	New
Communist	John Peck	1,331	2.62	
Majority		5,053	9.93	
Turnout		59,638	85.30	
Labour hold		Swing		

General election 1955: Nottingham North
Party	Candidate	Votes	%	±%
Labour	James Harrison	26,552	55.40	
Conservative	Ian G Colvin	20,462	42.69	
Communist	John Peck	916	1.91	
Majority		6,090	12.71	
Turnout		60,234	79.57	
Labour win (new seat)				

== See also ==
- List of parliamentary constituencies in Nottinghamshire
