= John Peck (politician) =

British Communist and Green politician (1922–2004)

John Harold Peck (August 1922 – 28 March 2004) was a British communist politician, known for contesting a large number of elections before finally winning one. He served as a Nottingham City Councillor from 1987 to 1997, for the Communist Party of Great Britain and then the Green Party.

== Early life ==
Born in Caistor in Lincolnshire, Peck grew up in Scunthorpe and was educated at Scunthorpe Grammar School.

He was a pilot with the Royal Air Force Volunteer Reserve during the Second World War. Flying Officer Peck was awarded the Distinguished Flying Cross in 1945. Inspired both by experience of postings in Calcutta and the American Deep South, and also an uncle who was an active communist, he joined the Communist Party of Great Britain (CPGB) in 1944.

== Political activism ==
After the war, Peck worked at Scunthorpe Steelworks and became an active trade unionist. He first stood for election for the CPGB in the November 1946 Borough of Scunthorpe elections. In 1947, he took only 146 votes for the Scunthorpe seat of Lindsey County Council. In 1948, he moved to Nottingham to take up a full-time post for the CPGB area committee, and in 1955 began regularly contesting the Bulwell ward of Nottingham City Council. He also contested Nottingham North at the 1955 general election, the first of ten unsuccessful attempts to win the seat. In his election campaigns, Peck often used photographs of himself in RAF uniform, wearing his medals, something which proved controversial with other CPGB members.

Peck became a well-known figure in Nottingham, and in the 1960 film Saturday Night and Sunday Morning, he is shown speaking to a meeting at the gates of a factory. He served as first secretary, then president, of the Bulwell Tenants Association, and during the 1970s he was vice-president and president of the Nottingham Trades Council.

During the 1980s, Peck served as national election agent for the CPGB, briefly as acting national organiser, and eventually was elected to the CPGB's executive committee. However, he increasingly came into conflict with other local members, becoming one of the few supporters of the Eurocommunist leadership in the area.

== Electoral success ==
In May 1987, Peck finally won the Nottingham City Council seat of Bulwell East, at his 36th attempt. After a by-election in November 1988 until May 1990 the city council was under no overall control; both Labour and the Conservatives held 27 seats. As the only other councillor, Peck, effectively held the casting vote. He generally sided with Labour, but voted against them to prevent a reorganisation of council departments.

In 1990, with the CPGB on the verge of dissolution, Peck defected to the Green Party of England and Wales, for which he held his seat at three elections, until he retired in 1997. In total, he contested 49 elections at various levels, a record acknowledged by the Guinness Book of Records.

== Retirement ==
Peck published his autobiography, Persistence: The Story of a British Communist, in 2001 while leading the Nottingham Pensioners' Action Group. He died in 2004 after suffering ill health.

== See also ==
- Communist Party of Great Britain election results
- Perennial candidate
