= John Mahon (politician) =

British communist political activist (1901–1975)

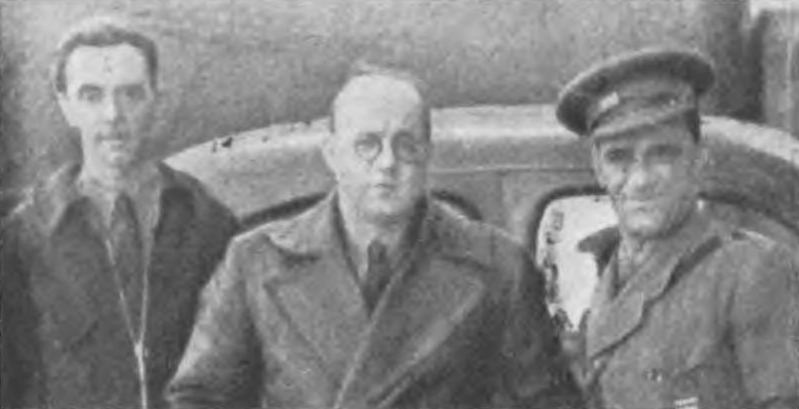
Commissar John Mahon (left) and Bill Rust (center) with Lieutenant Colonel Vladimir Ćopić, 1937

John Augustus Mahon (1 December 1901 – 17 May 1975) was a British communist political activist.

The son of socialist leader John Lincoln Mahon, John Mahon was born in Dublin, but grew up in London. He was educated at St Olave's and St Saviour's Grammar School before finding employment at an engineering works.

Mahon was a founding member of the Communist Party of Great Britain (CPGB), and soon became a full-time political worker in the party. He first achieved prominence in the party's National Minority Movement (NMM) in the 1920s. He was known for his antipathy toward existing trade unions, taking one of the more hardline views of the party's "class against class" policy. By the start of the 1930s, the NMM was winding down, but Mahon was named editor of its newspaper, The Worker. He served as the election agent for party leader Harry Pollitt's unsuccessful campaign in the 1930 Whitechapel and St Georges by-election, and in 1931 was appointed as the CPGB's representative to the Profintern. In this role, Mahon visited Moscow, attending a meeting of the Executive Committee of the Communist International. Meanwhile, matters came to a head over his political views after party theoretician Rajani Palme Dutt wrote in support of Mahon, but Pollitt was able to manoeuvre the party into dissolving the NMM and refocusing on work in the existing trade unions.

With the NMM no longer in existence, Mahon found a role as Industrial Organiser for the London District of the CPGB. In 1937, he served as Political Commissar for the British Battalion in the Spanish Civil War, but soon returned to London. In 1947, he replaced Ted Bramley as District Secretary, and was also elected to the party's Executive Committee for the first time. He stood unsuccessfully for election on three occasions: in the 1949 St Pancras North by-election, in Battersea North at the 1950 general election, and in Lewisham South in 1951. He retired from his party posts in 1966, and was replaced as District Secretary by Frank Stanley.

Mahon spent his retirement writing a biography of Harry Pollitt, which was published in 1974.

John Mahon died on 17 May 1975 in Leatherhead, Surrey. He was 73.

Party political offices
Preceded by Ted Bramley	London District Secretary of the Communist Party of Great Britain; 1947 – 1966	Succeeded by Frank Stanley
