= Matt Lygate =

Scottish Marxist activist and bank robber

Matthew (Matt) Lygate (26 December 1938 – 10 January 2012) was a Scottish Marxist revolutionary, political activist, tailor, poet, artist and founder of the Workers Party of Scotland. Convicted of bank robbery in 1972, he served the longest ever sentence in Scottish legal history for robbery despite not committing bodily harm, serving 11 years of a 24-year sentence in HM Prison Edinburgh. He is noted for his strong anti-revisionist stance and adoption of Maoism in the 1960s.

== Early life ==
Lygate was born in Govan, Glasgow and he was educated at St Gerard's Senior Secondary School in Glasgow, leaving aged fifteen. His family moved to Sunderland as a teenager. At a young age he joined the CPGB. When called for National Service, Lygate refused to join the British Army because he considered it "imperialist" and fled to New Zealand. He spent six years in New Zealand and visited some other countries before his return to Scotland.

== Return To UK ==
Upon return to the UK, Lygate became active in the Scottish and Irish republican movements. He was also a leading socialist, and in 1967 founded the Workers Party of Scotland, and was a founding member of the John Maclean Society. The WPS claimed to be, "based fundamentally upon the Communist Manifesto of Marx and Engels and the subsequent development of Marxism by Lenin, Stalin, Mao Tsetung, Enver Hoxha and John Maclean". Lygate supported Scottish home-rule and advocated to socialism in Scotland in tradition with John Maclean and the Red Clydeside. The WPS grew slowly and mimicked similar far-left groups that were sprouting across Europe in the 1960s. The WPS supported the revival of Gaelic and published works of Mao Tsetung in Gaelic. Lygate contested numerous by-elections, however, firmly believed that socialism could only be established through revolution. He and the WPS defended the actions of the Army of the Provisional Government, often referred to as the "Tartan Terrorists".

== Bank Robbery ==
Lygate knew that the party was short of funds, stunting its growth. In 1971, along with 3 others (William "Bill" McPherson, Colin Lawson and Ian Doran), Lygate robbed two banks, netting the party £14,000. However, McPherson and Doran committed two more robberies on their own; it was then that a shotgun was fired and gave police a lead, eventually leading to the arrest of the four.

== In Court ==
Lygate appeared at the High Court in Glasgow, with the trial lasting eleven days. On the tenth day of the trial, Lygate dismissed his counsel. He pleaded not guilty, arguing that he robbed capitalist institutions who had robbed the working-class, and that his case was a matter of the working-class versus the state. He made an infamous long speech about capitalism's violence against the working man, however was sentenced to 24 years in HM Prison Edinburgh. He was sentenced on 20 March 1972. Upon being sentenced in the public gallery Lygate clenched his fist and shouted, "Long live the workers of Scotland!". The sentence given to him was on par with the Great Train Robbers and some of the worst IRA convicts. Many criticisms of his sentence would arise arguing that it was politically motivated. A lawyer commented later on Lygate's case that he was given 8 years for robbery and 16 for politics.

== Prison ==
In prison Lygate still agitated the Crown, refusing to wear his prison uniform and spent time on hunger strike. He devoted much of his time to teaching his fellow inmates how to read, write and paint. He wrote many poems and sent portraits done by him to families of inmates. He protested for prisoners rights and set-up numerous organizations for prisoners' rights. He also spent some time reading and taking a course in sociology. During Lygate's imprisonment his father died. More than five years of his term was spent as a category A high risk prisoner. The Scottish Republican Socialist Party (SRSM) used the Queen's Park by-election to protest for the release of Lygate in 1982. Siol Nan Gaidheal also supported his release. On 19 September 1983, after serving 11 years of his sentence, Lygate was released on parole.

== After Prison ==
After prison, the WPS became active again and its membership grew. Lygate and the WPS participated in anti-Poll Tax demonstrations across the UK and actively organised the working class. Lygate founded the small bookshop 'Phoenix Press', it was during this time he meet his partner, Linda, and had 3 children. Lygate claimed, "I am not a Trotskyist... I am a Marxist-Leninist and an anarchist in the true sense." According to a report of one conference which he attended in November 1983: "As befits a conference attended by such veteran anti-imperialist supporters of the Asian socialist countries as Comrade Matt Lygate, delegates repeatedly stressed the vanguard role of the Asian communist tradition and the teachings of the great leaders Comrade Mao Zedong and Comrade Kim Il Sung. A reception was held in a warm atmosphere overflowing with proletarian internationalism, at which the delegates joined together in singing revolutionary songs including the ‘Song of General Kim Il Sung’, ‘Scots wha hae’, ‘the Soldier’s Song’ and ‘the Internationale’." Lygate was nominated to become Rector of Glasgow University, Lygate was the first of the six candidates to be knocked out. He was twice nominated for honorary degrees at Glasgow and Edinburgh University, he rejected both of them believing that they might corrupt him from his working class route. Lygate claimed to be an early driving force of the anti-poll tax movement, however his health worsened. Finally in the late 1990s he was forced out of politics completely due to ill health.

== Death ==
In latter life, Lygate suffered from Alzheimer's disease which deteriorated his short-term memory. It was noted that even in the final stages of the disease he could still recite poems by Robert Burns. He died on 20 January 2012, having been hit by a train.

In struggle, man can use his mind,

And know himself the better, With courage bold he'll battle on

And free himself from fetter.

— Matt Lygate

== See also ==
- John MacLean
- Vladimir Lenin
- Scottish Republicanism
