= George Buchanan (politician) =

British politician (1890-1955)

The Right Honourable George Buchanan
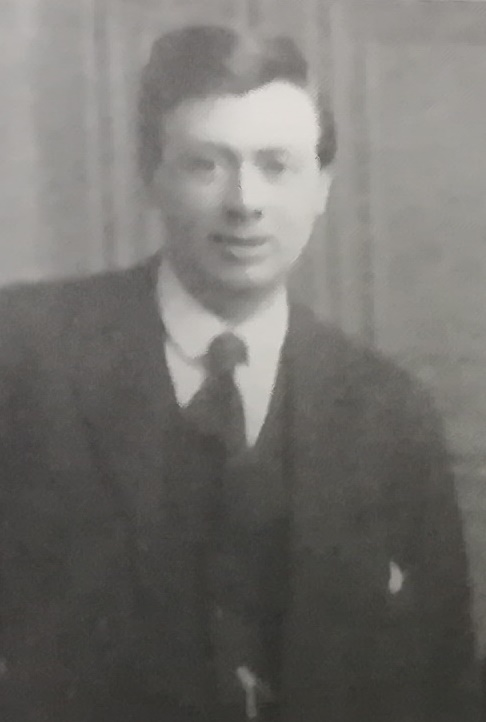
- Buchanan in 1921

Minister of Pensions
- In office 7 October 1947 – 2 July 1948
- Monarch: George VI
- Prime Minister: Clement Attlee
- Preceded by: John Burns Hynd
- Succeeded by: Hilary Marquand

Under-Secretary of State for Scotland
- In office 4 August 1945 – 7 October 1947; Served with Tom Fraser
- Monarch: George VI
- Prime Minister: Clement Attlee
- Sec. of State: Joseph Westwood

Chairman of the National Assistance Board
- In office 1948–1953

Member of Parliament for Glasgow Gorbals
- In office 15 November 1922 – 2 July 1948
- Preceded by: George Barnes
- Succeeded by: Alice Cullen

Personal details
- Born: 30 November 1890 Cairo, Egypt
- Died: 28 June 1955 (aged 64) Glasgow, Scotland, UK
- Party: Labour
- Other political affiliations: Independent Labour Party

George Buchanan (30 November 1890 – 28 June 1955) was a Scottish patternmaker, trade union activist and Member of Parliament.

Buchanan was born in Glasgow, Scotland. A committed socialist, he joined the Independent Labour Party (ILP).

Buchanan was vice-chairman of Glasgow Trades Council and sat on the City Council from 1919 to 1923. At the 1922 general election, he was elected to the House of Commons as the Member of Parliament (MP) for Glasgow Gorbals.

Buchanan supported Home Rule for Scotland and he was associated with the Scottish Home Rule Association. In 1924 he introduced a Scottish Home Rule Bill but despite support from Scottish MPs it was talked out by the Opposition.

In 1932, Buchanan became Chairman of the United Patternmakers Association of Great Britain, which he held for 16 years. He initially agreed with James Maxton's moving the ILP out of the mainstream Labour Party but decided to leave it to rejoin Labour in 1939.

At the 1945 general election, Buchanan retained the seat of Glasgow Gorbals and attained the largest increase in percentage of voters in recorded UK history. After the election, the new prime minister, Clement Attlee, appointed Buchanan as Under-Secretary of State for Scotland. Buchanan also later served as Minister of Pensions.

Buchanan resigned from Parliament in 1948 to take up the position of Chairman of the National Assistance Board and was succeeded by Alice Cullen, who had already succeeded him as the candidate for Glasgow Gorbals.

He died in 1955, at 64.

Parliament of the United Kingdom
Preceded by George Barnes	Member of Parliament for Glasgow Gorbals; 1922–1948	Succeeded by Alice Cullen
Preceded by John Hynd	Minister of Pensions; 7 October 1947 to 2 July 1948	Succeeded by Hilary Marquand
Trade union offices
Preceded by Albert E. Wardale	President of the United Patternmakers' Association; 1932–1946	Succeeded by Ellis Smith
