= Islington South =

Islington South may refer to:

- Islington South and Finsbury (UK Parliament constituency) (1974–present)
- Islington South (UK Parliament constituency) (1885–1950)
- Islington South (London County Council constituency) (1889–1949)

== See also ==
- Islington South West (UK Parliament constituency) (1950–1974)
- Islington South West (London County Council constituency) (1949–1965)
