= Muriel Morgan Gibbon =

British journalist, novelist, and politician

Morgan Gibbon in 1929

Muriel Morgan Gibbon (14 January 1887 – 1975), was a British journalist, novelist, barrister and Liberal Party politician.

== Early life ==
Morgan Gibbon was born the daughter of Reverend J. Morgan Gibbon, of Stamford Hill Congregational Church. She was educated at Girton College, Cambridge where she earned a Master of Arts in the Classics.

== Professional career ==
Morgan Gibbon worked as a journalist. She was also a novelist; her publications included:

- Jan (1920)
- Helen Marsden - A Novel
- The Alternative (1921)
- John Peregrine's Wife (1922)
- Others Came
- Justin Keyes
- The Pharisees (1922)
- No 7 Paradise
- Curious Fool (1939)

She received a call to the bar by the Middle Temple in 1938 and practised in the divorce courts. In 1962 she was present in the courtroom when Elizabeth Lane took her seat as the first female Divorce Court commissioner.

== Political career ==
Morgan Gibbon joined David Lloyd George supporting National Liberals in 1922, serving on the Hackney North committee. She was selected as prospective parliamentary Liberal candidate for the Norwood division of Lambeth in 1926. She first ran as Liberal London County Council candidate for Islington South in 1928. She was adopted as the Liberal parliamentary candidate for Hackney South in February 1929 and contested the general election a few months later, finishing second to Herbert Morrison. She did not stand for parliament again. During the 1931 General Election, she spoke in support of Herbert Morrison in his election campaign. She joined the Labour Party in November 1931.

=== Electoral record ===
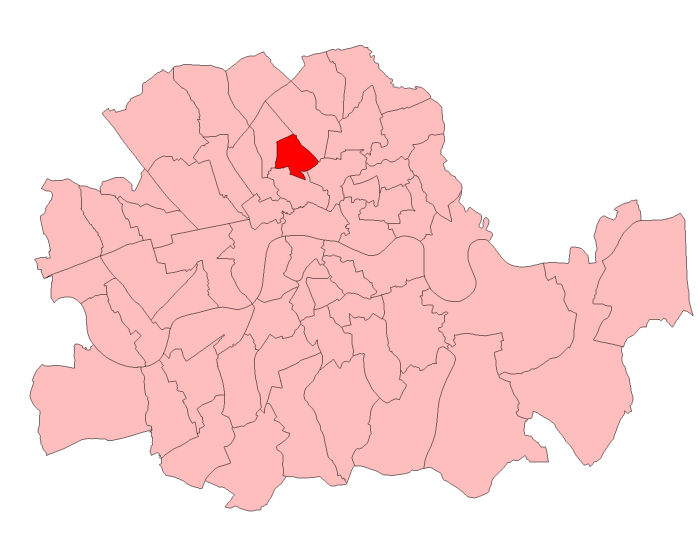
Islington South

1928 London County Council election: Islington South
Party	Candidate	Votes	%	±%
Labour	Charles R Bennett	5,272	22.34	
Labour	George House	5,266	22.31	
Municipal Reform	Tom Howard	4,876	20.66	
Municipal Reform	William Thoresby Cooksey	4,786	20.28	
Liberal	Muriel Morgan Gibbon	1,713	7.26	
Liberal	David Eifion Puleston Evans	1,689	7.16	
Majority		480	2.03	
Labour gain from Municipal Reform		Swing		
Labour gain from Municipal Reform		Swing		

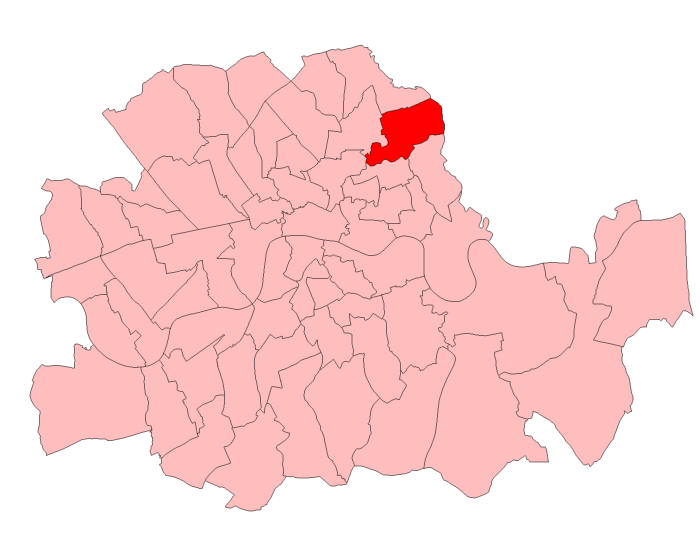
Hackney South

General Election 1929: Hackney South
Party	Candidate	Votes	%	±%
Labour	Herbert Morrison	15,590	51.2	+4.7
Unionist	Tresham Lever	8,222	27.0	n/a
Liberal	Muriel Morgan Gibbon	6,302	20.7	−32.8
Communist	J. T. Murphy	331	1.1	n/a
Majority		7,368	24.2	n/a
Turnout		30,445	69.2	−3.3
Registered electors		43,997		
Labour gain from Liberal		Swing	+18.8	
