= Charles Higham =

Charles Higham may refer to:

- Charles Higham (archaeologist) (born 1939), British archaeologist, specialising in the archaeology of Southeast Asia
- Charles Higham (biographer) (1931–2012), biographer and poet, son of Sir Charles Higham
- Sir Charles Higham (publicist) (1886–1938), British publicist, author and member of Parliament
