= Frank Milton =

British Liberal Party politician and magistrate

Milton in 1928

Sir Frank Milton (born Frank Milton Lowenstein; 6 January 1906 – 8 January 1976) was a British Liberal Party politician and magistrate.

== Background ==
Milton was born in Hampstead, London, the son of G. Lowenstein, Director of S. Japhet & Co. Ltd of London. He was educated at Bembridge School, St John's College, Oxford where he received a Master of Arts. In 1924, he dropped his surname of Lowenstein.

In 1940, he married Barbara McFadyean. In 1945 the marriage was dissolved. In 1954 he married Iris Averil Neave. They had two adopted sons. He was knighted in 1970.

== Professional career ==
Milton received a Call to Bar, Lincoln's Inn in 1930. He became a Bencher in 1967. He worked on the south-eastern circuit. He served in the War of 1939–45 in the Royal Artillery, reaching the rank of Major. He was a Metropolitan Magistrate from 1952–67. He was Chairman of Epping Group Hospital Management Committee from 1958–63. He was a Member of the Standing Committee on Criminal Law Revision from 1959. He was a Member of the Committee on Immigration Appeals from 1966–67. He was a Member of the Committee on the Distribution of Criminal Business from 1974. He was the Deputy Chairman of Hertfordshire Quarterly Sessions from 1965–71. He was Chief Metropolitan Magistrate on 1967–75.

== Political career ==
Milton was Liberal candidate for the South Islington division of London at the 1929 General Election. It was not a promising seat as the Liberals had come a clear third at the previous election. He came third and only managed to retain the Liberal share of the vote;

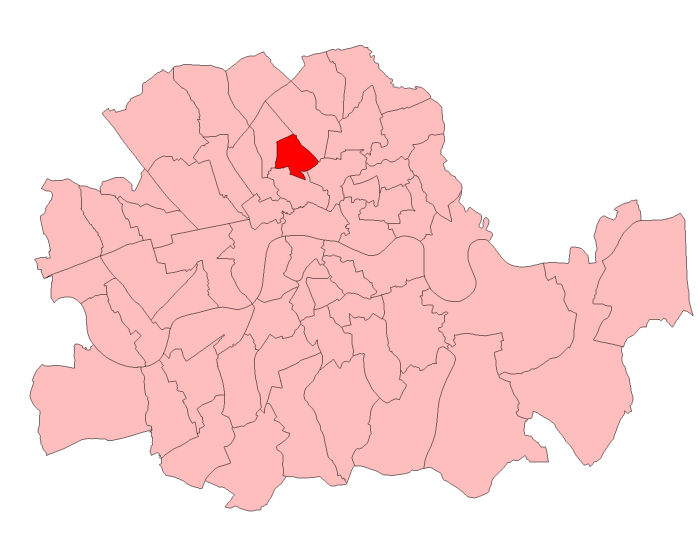
Islington South in the County of London, showing boundaries used in 1929

General Election 30 May 1929: Islington South Electorate 44,490
Party	Candidate	Votes	%	±%
Labour	William Sampson Cluse	13,737	46.6	+3.8
Unionist	Tom Forrest Howard	9,418	32.0	−3.9
Liberal	Frank Milton	6,316	21.4	+0.1
Majority		4,319	14.6	
Turnout			66.2	−3.2
Labour hold		Swing	+3.8	

He did not stand for parliament again.
