= Islington South (London County Council constituency) =

London County Council constituency

- Former constituency for the London County Council

Former constituency
- Created: 1889
- Abolished: 1949
- Member(s): 2
- Replaced by: Islington South West

Islington South was a constituency used for elections to the London County Council between 1889 and 1949. The seat shared boundaries with the UK Parliament constituency of the same name.

== Councillors ==
Year	Name	Party	Name	Party
1889	George Samuel Elliott	Progressive	Richard Roberts	Progressive
1898	George Samuel Elliott	Independent Progressive	Howell Jones Williams	Progressive
1901	George Samuel Elliott	Moderate	Howell Jones Williams	Progressive
1904	George Dew	Progressive	Howell Jones Williams	Progressive
1925	William Thoresby Cooksey	Municipal Reform	Tom Howard	Municipal Reform
1928	Charles Bennett	Labour	George House	Labour
1931	William Thoresby Cooksey	Municipal Reform	Tom Howard	Municipal Reform
1934	John Dugdale	Labour	Eric Fletcher	Labour
1941	George Leonard Parker	Labour	Eric Fletcher	Labour
1946	George Percival Wright	Labour	Eric Fletcher	Labour

== Election results ==
1889 London County Council election: Islington South
Party	Candidate	Votes	%	±%
Progressive	George Samuel Elliott	2,663		
Progressive	Richard Roberts	1,284		
Progressive	Alfred Memory	1,012		
Independent	Spencer Furlong	713		
Progressive hold		Swing	N/A	
Progressive hold		Swing	N/A	

1892 London County Council election: Islington South
Party	Candidate	Votes	%	±%
Progressive	George Samuel Elliott	Unopposed	N/A	
Progressive	Richard Roberts	Unopposed	N/A	
Progressive hold		Swing	N/A	
Progressive hold		Swing	N/A	

1895 London County Council election: Islington South
Party	Candidate	Votes	%	±%
Progressive	George Samuel Elliott	1,962		
Progressive	Richard Roberts	1,632		
Ind. Conservative	A. A. Saltern Willett	886		
Independent Labour	F. A. White	233		
Ind. Labour Party	J. Morgan	73		
Ind. Labour Party	James Frederick Shilaker	44		
Progressive hold		Swing	N/A	
Progressive hold		Swing	N/A	

1898 London County Council election: Islington South
Party	Candidate	Votes	%	±%
Independent	George Samuel Elliott	2,377		
Progressive	Howell Jones Williams	2,172		
Moderate	Frank Kimber Bull	1,543		
Progressive hold		Swing		
Independent gain from Progressive		Swing		

1901 London County Council election: Islington South
Party	Candidate	Votes	%	±%
Progressive	Howell Jones Williams	unopposed	n/a	n/a
Independent	George Samuel Elliott	unopposed	n/a	n/a
Progressive hold		Swing	n/a	
Independent hold		Swing	n/a	

1904 London County Council election: Islington South
Party	Candidate	Votes	%	±%
Progressive	Howell Jones Williams	2,536		
Progressive	George Dew	2,437		
Independent	George Samuel Elliott	1,770		
Independent	S. Lambert	1,526		
Independent Progressive	A. Memory	356		
Majority				
Progressive hold		Swing		

1907 London County Council election: Islington South
Party	Candidate	Votes	%	±%
Progressive	George Dew	2,996		
Progressive	Howell Jones Williams	2,929		
Municipal Reform	S. Lambert	2,217		
Municipal Reform	C. Moffatt	2,076		
Independent	George Samuel Elliott	854		
Independent	E. J. James	179		
Majority				
Progressive hold		Swing		

1910 London County Council election: Islington South
Party	Candidate	Votes	%	±%
Progressive	Howell Jones Williams	2,855	26.7	
Progressive	George Dew	2,841	26.6	
Municipal Reform	S. Lambert	2,515	23.5	
Municipal Reform	Violet Douglas-Pennant	2,475	23.2	
Majority				
Progressive hold		Swing		

1913 London County Council election: Islington South
Party	Candidate	Votes	%	±%
Progressive	George Dew	3,197	26.6	+0.0
Progressive	Howell Jones Williams	3,195	26.6	−0.1
Municipal Reform	A. Dingli	2,829	23.5	+0.0
Municipal Reform	William Hunt	2,807	23.3	+0.1
Majority		366	3.0	
Progressive hold		Swing	-0.0	

1919 London County Council election: Islington South
Party	Candidate	Votes	%	±%
Progressive	Howell Jones Williams	Unopposed	N/A	N/A
Progressive	George Dew	Unopposed	N/A	N/A
Progressive hold		Swing	N/A	
Progressive hold		Swing	N/A	

1922 London County Council election: Islington South
Party	Candidate	Votes	%	±%
Progressive	Howell Jones Williams	4,916	25.6	n/a
Progressive	George Dew	4,882	25.4	n/a
Municipal Reform	A. Hudson	4,735	24.7	n/a
Municipal Reform	Hampton Lewis	4,665	24.3	n/a
Majority		147	0.7	n/a
Progressive hold		Swing	n/a	
Progressive hold		Swing	n/a	

1925 London County Council election: Islington South
Party	Candidate	Votes	%	±%
Municipal Reform	Tom Howard	4,701		
Municipal Reform	William Thoresby Cooksey	4,669		
Labour	M. Coleman	4,071		
Labour	Stanley Morgan	4,046		
Majority				
Municipal Reform gain from Progressive		Swing	n/a	
Municipal Reform gain from Progressive		Swing	n/a	

1928 London County Council election: Islington South
Party	Candidate	Votes	%	±%
Labour	Charles R Bennett	5,272	22.34	
Labour	George House	5,266	22.31	
Municipal Reform	Tom Howard	4,876	20.66	
Municipal Reform	William Thoresby Cooksey	4,786	20.28	
Liberal	Muriel Morgan Gibbon	1,713	7.26	
Liberal	David Eifion Puleston Evans	1,689	7.16	
Majority		480	2.03	
Labour gain from Municipal Reform		Swing		
Labour gain from Municipal Reform		Swing		

1931 London County Council election: Islington South
Party	Candidate	Votes	%	±%
Municipal Reform	Tom Howard	5,177		
Municipal Reform	William Thoresby Cooksey	5,019		
Labour	George House	4,676		
Labour	Charles R Bennett	4,613		
Majority				
Municipal Reform gain from Labour		Swing		
Municipal Reform gain from Labour		Swing		

1934 London County Council election: Islington South
Party	Candidate	Votes	%	±%
Labour	Eric Fletcher	5,765		
Labour	John Dugdale	5,626		
Municipal Reform	Tom Howard	4,797		
Municipal Reform	William Thoresby Cooksey	4,587		
Majority				
Labour gain from Municipal Reform		Swing		
Labour gain from Municipal Reform		Swing		

1937 London County Council election: Islington South
Party	Candidate	Votes	%	±%
Labour	Eric Fletcher	7,805		
Labour	John Dugdale	7,717		
Municipal Reform	F. Martineau	4,192		
Municipal Reform	D. Walker-Smith	4,131		
Majority				
Labour hold		Swing		
Labour hold		Swing		

1946 London County Council election: Islington South
Party	Candidate	Votes	%	±%
Labour	Eric Fletcher	4,032		
Labour	George Percival Wright	3,848		
Conservative	Tom Howard	2,030		
Conservative	Deakin	1,998		
Majority				
Labour hold		Swing		
Labour hold		Swing		
