= 1947 Islington West by-election =

UK Parliamentary by-election

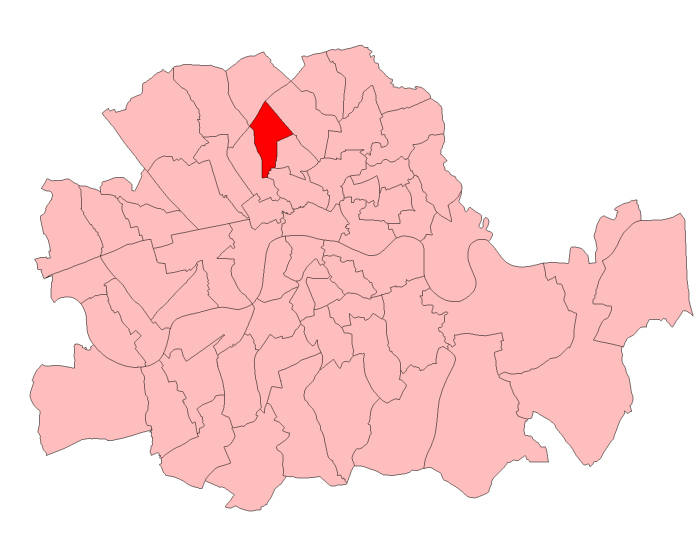
Islington West in the County of London, showing boundaries used in 1947

The 1947 Islington West by-election was held on 25 September 1947.

The by-election was held due to the appointment to hereditary peerage of the incumbent Labour MP, Frederick Montague.

== Previous election ==
General election, 5 July 1945: Islington West
Party	Candidate	Votes	%	±%
Labour	Frederick Montague	11,496	73.8	+18.8
Conservative	E. T. Hope	4,090	26.2	−18.8
Majority		7,406	47.6	+37.6
Turnout		15,586	60.1	+7.5
Labour hold		Swing	+18.8	

== Result ==
It was won by the Labour candidate Albert Evans, albeit with a reduced share of the poll compared to 1945.

1947 Islington West by-election
Party	Candidate	Votes	%	±%
Labour	Albert Evans	8,760	57.2	−16.6
Conservative	Tom Forrest Howard	4,084	26.6	+0.4
Liberal	Edwin Malindine	2,459	16.0	New
Independent	L. J. Wildman	33	0.2	New
Majority		4,676	30.6	−17.0
Turnout		15,336	51.4	−8.7
Labour hold		Swing	-8.5	
