= Albert Evans (politician) =

British politician

Member of Parliament for Islington South West Islington West (1947–1950)
- In office 25 September 1947 – 29 May 1970
- Preceded by: Frederick Montague
- Succeeded by: George Cunningham

Personal details
- Born: 10 June 1903
- Died: 4 December 1988 (aged 85)
- Party: Labour

Albert Evans (10 June 1903 – 4 December 1988), was a British Labour Party politician.

A master engraver, Evans became involved in the Labour movement in the 1920s, and was elected to Islington Borough Council in 1936. In March 1946 he was elected to the London County Council to represent Islington West.

He was first elected to Parliament at a by-election in 1947, when the Labour Member of Parliament for Islington West, Frederick Montague, was elevated to the peerage as Baron Amwell.

The Islington West constituency was abolished for the 1950 general election, when Evans was elected in the new Islington South West constituency. He held the seat until he retired from the House of Commons at the 1970 general election.

== See also ==
- Dorothy Galton (sister-in-law)

Parliament of the United Kingdom
Preceded by Frederick Montague	Member of Parliament for Islington West; 1947–1950	Constituency abolished
New constituency	Member of Parliament for Islington South West; 1950–1970	Succeeded by George Cunningham
