= Howell Jones Williams =

Welsh politician

Williams

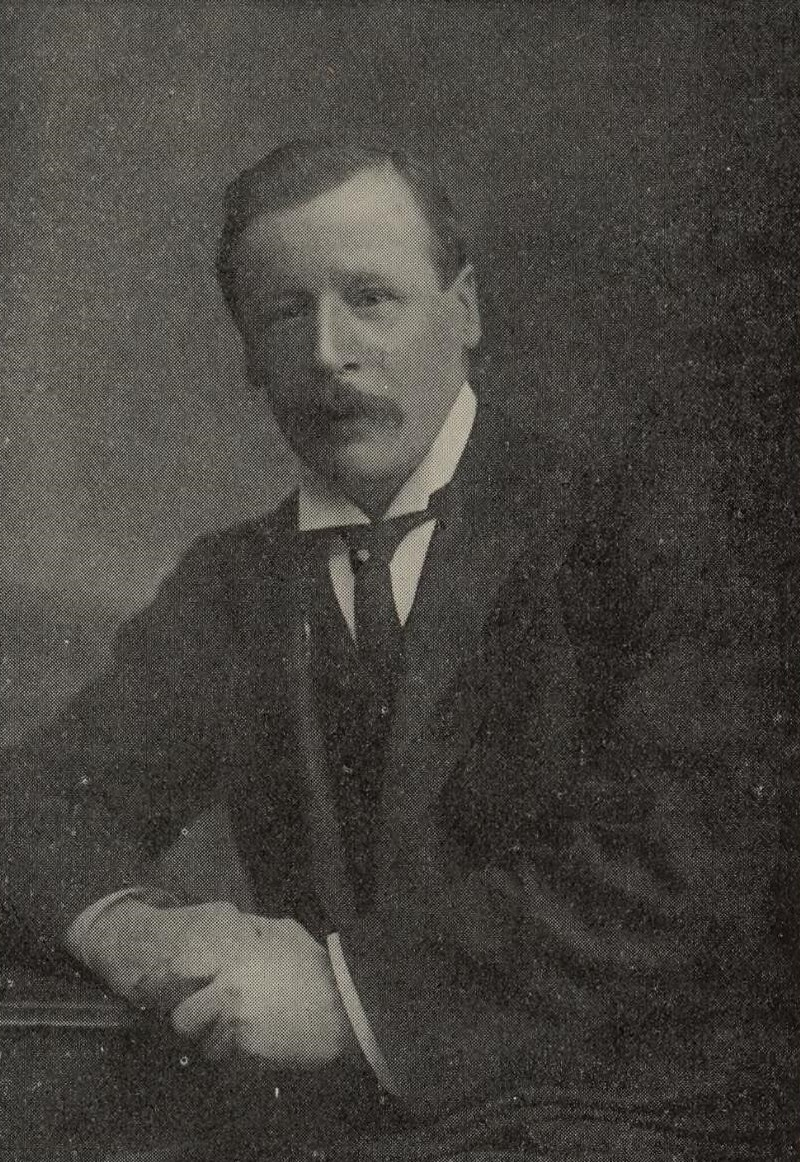
Howell J. Williams

Sir Howell Jones Williams DL JP (died 13 August 1939), was a Welsh Progressive politician and a prominent London builder. He represented Islington South on the London County Council from 1898 to 1925.

== Background ==
Williams was born in Merioneth, Wales, but spent his adult life in London. He was a prominent builder and city council member. Williams success in London did not remove him from his Welsh roots. He was an active member of the London Welsh community; this is highlighted by his 1923-1924 presidency of the London Welsh Trust. Additionally, he acted as the Sheriff of Merionethshire in 1917.

Williams was married and had three sons.

His sons were Howell Williams (circa 1895), Captain Arthur Ifor Meakin Williams (1895 - 9 October 1918), Meyrick Richard M Williams (1900 - 1967)

== Building ==
Some of the more noteworthy buildings constructed by Williams are the Daily Mail and Evening News Offices on the Thames Embankment, Rotherhithe Town Hall, and a substantial number of buildings along Gray's Inn Road. Of particular note are buildings for the Benchers of Gray's Inn and the London Welsh Centre.

The London Welsh Centre was built on a 15,000 square foot lot that Williams purchased for this purpose. Upon completion of the building, he gifted it to the Young Wales Association for their use.

While not constructed directly by Williams, the David's Wing of the Royal Northern Hospital was built with donations from Williams. With donations of £158,000, Williams was the hospitals largest benefactor. The building has since been demolished but a memorial wall of plaques remains; one of these plaques recognizes Williams' contribution to the building.

== Political career ==
Williams was Progressive candidate for the Rotherhithe division of Southwark, at a by-election on 31 March 1894. He was elected to the London County Council (LCC), holding the seat for the party. He served until the full elections in 1895. He was Progressive candidate for the Islington South division at the 1898 LCC elections. He was elected, holding the seat for the party. He was re-elected for Islington South at the next seven elections. He was a Justice of the Peace in the County of London. He was a Deputy Lieutenant and served as High Sheriff of Merionethshire from 1917–18. He was knighted in 1921. He was Deputy Chairman of the London County Council in 1921.

=== Electoral record ===
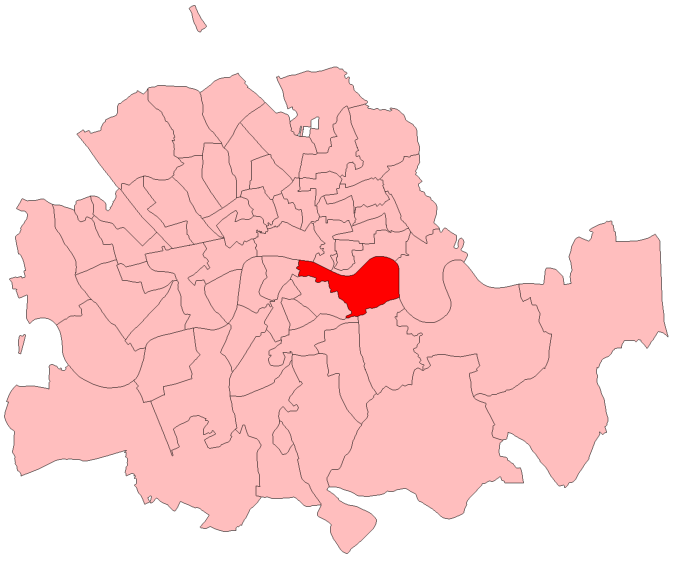
Rotherhithe in London 1885-1918

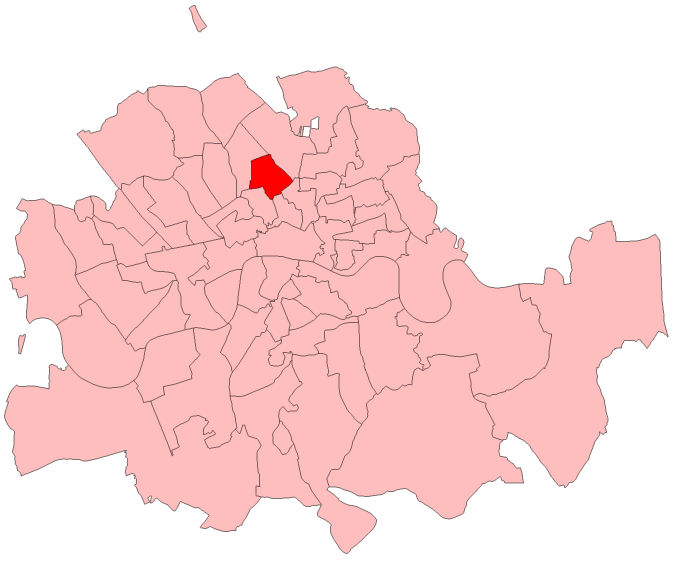
Islington South in London 1885-1918

1901 London County Council election: Islington South
Party	Candidate	Votes	%	±%
Progressive	Howell Jones Williams	unopposed	n/a	n/a
Independent	George Samuel Elliott	unopposed	n/a	n/a
Progressive hold		Swing	n/a	
Independent hold		Swing	n/a	

1910 London County Council election: Islington South
Party	Candidate	Votes	%	±%
Progressive	Howell Jones Williams	2,855	26.7	
Progressive	George Dew	2,841	26.6	
Municipal Reform	S Lambert	2,515	23.5	
Municipal Reform	Violet Douglas-Pennant	2,475	23.2	
Majority				
Progressive hold		Swing		

1913 London County Council election: Islington South
Party	Candidate	Votes	%	±%
Progressive	George Dew	3,197	26.6	+0.0
Progressive	Howell Jones Williams	3,195	26.6	−0.1
Municipal Reform	A Dingli	2,829	23.5	+0.0
Municipal Reform	William Hunt	2,807	23.3	+0.1
Majority		366	3.0	
Progressive hold		Swing	-0.0	

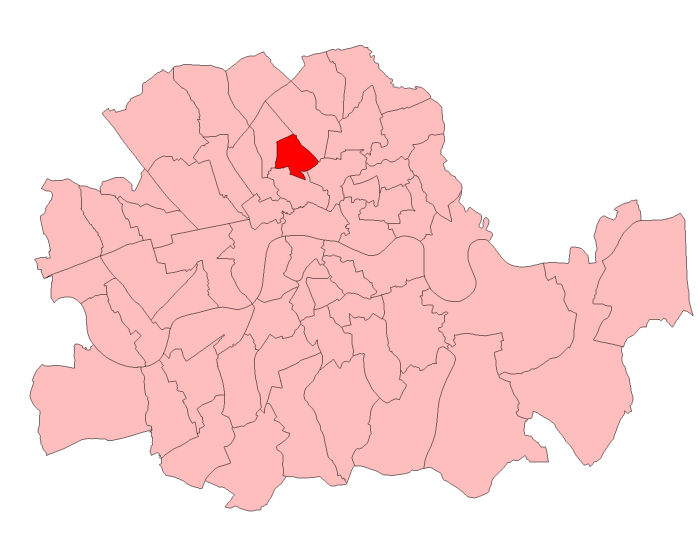
Islington South in London 1918-49

1919 London County Council election: Islington South
Party	Candidate	Votes	%	±%
Progressive	Howell Jones Williams	Unopposed	n/a	n/a
Progressive	George Dew	Unopposed	n/a	n/a
Progressive hold		Swing	n/a	
Progressive hold		Swing	n/a	

1922 London County Council election: Islington South
Party	Candidate	Votes	%	±%
Progressive	Sir Howell Jones Williams	4,916	25.6	n/a
Progressive	George Dew	4,882	25.4	n/a
Municipal Reform	A Hudson	4,735	24.7	n/a
Municipal Reform	G Hampton Lewis	4,665	24.3	n/a
Majority		147	0.7	n/a
Progressive hold		Swing	n/a	
Progressive hold		Swing	n/a	
