= List of parliamentary constituencies in Islington =

The Islington area of North London, England, has been represented in the House of Commons of the Parliament of the United Kingdom through several parliamentary constituencies:

	1885–1950	1950–1974	1974–1983	1983–present
Islington Central			Feb 1974–1983	
Islington East	1885–Feb 1974			
Islington North	1885–present			
Islington South	1885–1950			
Islington West	1885–1950			
Islington South and Finsbury			Feb 1974–present	
Islington South West		1950–Feb 1974		

== See also ==
- List of parliamentary constituencies in London
