= Jack Stanley =

British trade union leader

Jack Stanley (1885 – 2 April 1957) was a British trade union leader.

Born in Liverpool, Stanley grew up in Salford. He worked in a foundry and joined the United Society of Boilermakers and Iron and Steel Shipbuilders. In 1922, he transferred to the British Iron, Steel and Kindred Trades Association (BISAKTA), and was elected as secretary of its Manchester branch the following year.

Within BISAKTA, steel erectors felt that they should have a distinct section. Stanley worked with George House to form this, the Constructional Engineering Union, and became its full-time Northern organiser. The union grew rapidly, and became independent in 1930. Stanley succeeded House as its general secretary in 1939.

Stanley was known as a left-wing activist. He was a member of the board of the Labour Publishing Society, which launched the Socialist Fellowship in 1949, and published Socialist Outlook, a newspaper associated with Gerry Healy. Under his leadership, the union affiliated to the Movement for Colonial Freedom.

Stanley announced that he would retire in May 1957, but he died before he was able to do so.

Trade union offices
Preceded by George House	Secretary of the Constructional Engineering Union; 1939–1957	Succeeded by Ernie Patterson
