= Richard Chamberlain (MP for Islington West) =

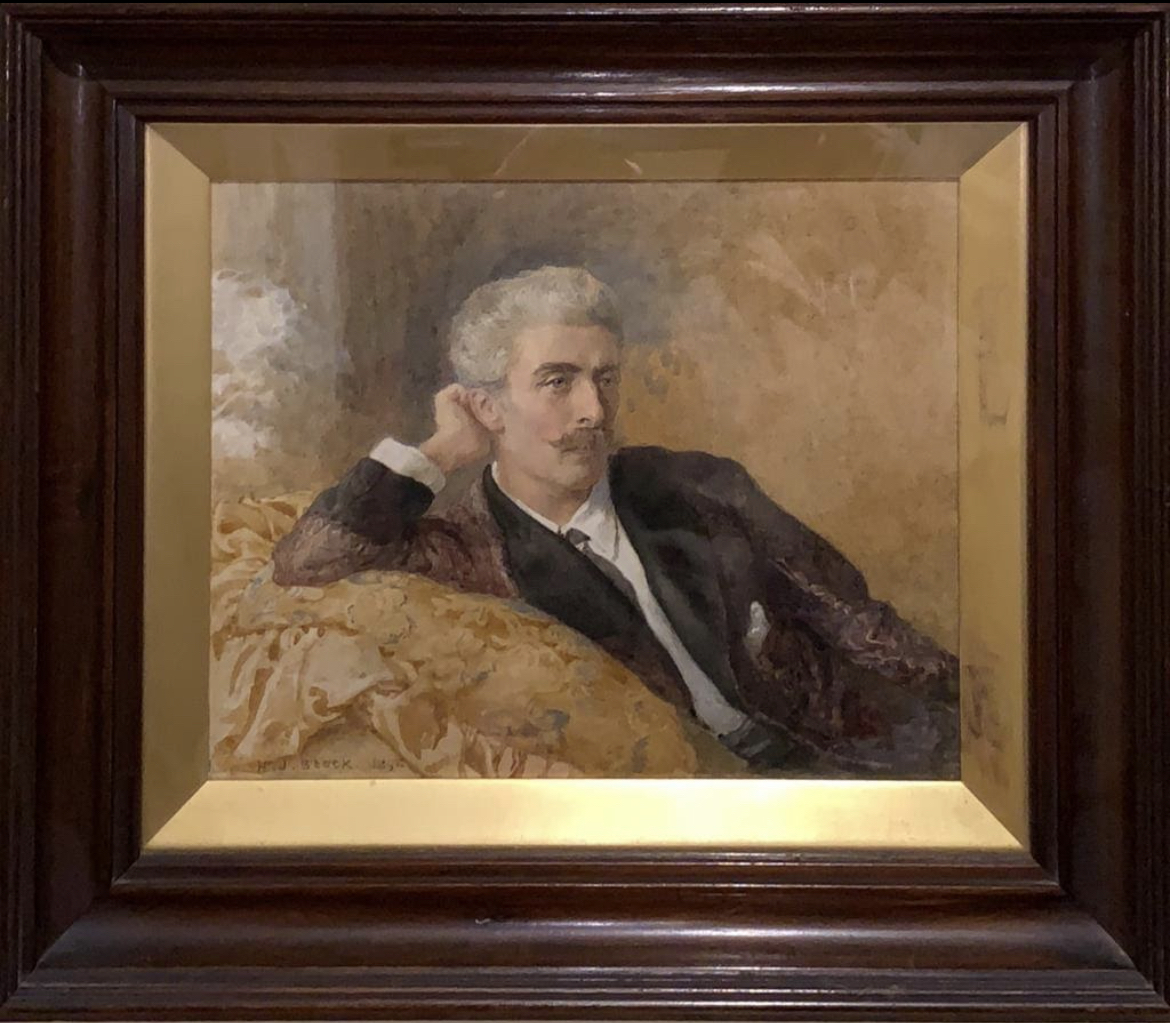

Richard Chamberlain (7 July 1840 – 2 April 1899) was a Liberal and later Liberal Unionist politician in the United Kingdom.

== Life ==
The younger brother of Joseph Chamberlain, he was born in Camberwell to Joseph Chamberlain (1796–1874) and Caroline Harben (1806–1875).

Chamberlain was Mayor of Birmingham from 1879 to 1880, and later Member of Parliament (MP) for Islington West from 1885 to 1892.

He died at age 58 and was buried at Key Hill Cemetery, Hockley, Birmingham.

== Family ==
Chamberlain married firstly, in 1872, Mary Dawes, daughter of the ironmaster Henry William Dawes of Kenilworth, and secondly, in 1887, Rahmen Theodora Swinburne, daughter of Sir John Swinburne, 7th Baronet.

His relative Robert Francis Martineau was also a City of Birmingham alderman and a member of the Birmingham University council.

Parliament of the United Kingdom
New constituency	Member of Parliament for Islington West; 1885–1892	Succeeded by Thomas Lough
