= Kenneth Robinson (British politician) =

British politician (1911–1996)

The Right Honourable Sir Kenneth Robinson

Chair of the Arts Council of Great Britain
- In office 1977–1982
- Prime Minister: James Callaghan, Margaret Thatcher
- Preceded by: Lord Gibson
- Succeeded by: William Rees-Mogg

Minister for Planning and Land
- In office 1 November 1968 – 6 October 1969
- Prime Minister: Harold Wilson
- Preceded by: Office Created
- Succeeded by: Office Abolished

Minister of Health
- In office 18 October 1964 – 1 November 1968
- Prime Minister: Harold Wilson
- Preceded by: Anthony Barber
- Succeeded by: Richard Crossman

Member of Parliament for St. Pancras North
- In office 10 March 1949 – 18 June 1970
- Preceded by: George House
- Succeeded by: Albert Stallard

Personal details
- Born: 19 March 1911 Warrington, England
- Died: 16 February 1996 (aged 84) London, England
- Party: Labour
- Spouse: Elizabeth Edwards (m. 1941; died 1993)
- Children: 1

Sir Kenneth Robinson (19 March 1911 – 16 February 1996) was a British Labour politician who served as Minister of Health in Harold Wilson's first government, from 1964 to 1968, when the position was merged into the new title of Secretary of State for Social Services.

== Early life ==
The son of Dr Clarence Robinson and a nurse, Ethel Marion Linell, Kenneth Robinson was born on 19 March 1911 in Warrington, northwest England. He was educated at Malsis School in North Yorkshire, before attending Oundle School up to the point of his father dying when he was just 15 years old. After his mother pulled him from the school because of costs, he later worked as a writer, insurance broker and company secretary. He joined the Royal Navy during World War II as an ordinary seaman, was commissioned in 1942 and promoted to lieutenant-commander in 1944. He served on HMS King George V. Robinson's education was remarkable in that he received no further education after the age of 15 and was entirely self-taught.

== Political career ==
Robinson was a St Pancras borough councillor from 1945 to 1949. He was elected to the House of Commons as Member of Parliament (MP) for St Pancras North in a by-election in 1949. He was a government assistant whip from 1950 until 1951. He joined the cabinet and was made a Privy Counsellor in 1964. Reforms he oversaw include the banning on cigarette television advertising and the reintroduction of prescription charges. When his position of Minister of Health was abolished in 1968, Robinson was appointed Minister for Planning and Land, only for this position to be abolished a year later. Robinson left Parliament in 1970.

Robinson gained particular notice and respect in his capacity as health minister. He was always willing to listen, and indeed took informal advice from his local general practitioners (GPs) during difficult negotiations over the GP Charter in 1965. John Horder stated of Robinson's role as Minister of Health: "Kenneth brought to this crisis a mind that was well prepared and the calmness, consideration and personality which we all have known". Robinson noticed problems with Britain's approach to general practice medicine, and quickly sought to reach agreement with practitioners and change the organisation, funding, and nature of practice in the system. Robinson published the first consultative document on reorganisation and the need for administrative reform of the National Health Service. One compromise he instituted was to reduce the number of hospital beds, under an argument of current under-utilisation, and in agreement with the medical profession. In return, the government lifted the limits on fees that medical consultants could charge to patients. These actions helped to form the basis for the 1966 General Practitioner's Charter, which Robinson negotiated with Dr James Cameron, the General Medical Services Committee chairman. Robinson also placed emphasis on nursing, appointing Sir Brian Salmon to a special committee of management experts and nurses, which looked into ways to advise and prepare senior staff at hospitals for their posts.

=== Opposition to Scientology in 1960s ===
Robinson had served as the first chairman of the National Association of Mental Health (now known as Mind). His interest in mental health issues brought him into conflict with the Church of Scientology, considered to hold controversial views on mental health: as Minister, he told Parliament that he was satisfied that Scientology was "totally valueless in promoting health and… that people seeking help with problems of mental health can gain nothing" from its teachings. Robinson stated that there was a "grave concern" among local government at the time about Scientology, and its potential effects on the town of East Grinstead. Robinson stated in 1968 in the House of Commons that Scientology was "a pseudo-philosophical cult". Time magazine also quoted Robinson as stating that the Church of Scientology was "socially harmful… a potential menace to the personality" and "a serious danger to health". In this speech, Robinson referred to the Anderson Report, cited additional evidence of why the group should be considered a cult, and stated that there was evidence children were being indoctrinated. Robinson announced that a series of measures would be undertaken against Scientology in Britain.

In 1968, the Church of Scientology started publishing articles that were of defamatory nature toward Robinson. Eventually Robinson sued the Church of Scientology of California and L. Ron Hubbard for libel. The case appeared before Justice Desmond Ackner, and was entitled: Robinson v Church of Scientology of California and Others. This resulted in a settlement between the parties in June 1973, where the Church of Scientology acknowledged that there was no truth to the published allegations, and offered its apologies to Robinson along with a "substantial sum to mark the gravity of the libels".

=== Support of reforms of laws ===
Robinson supported reform of the laws governing suicide in England and Wales (which was a criminal offence at the time) and in 1958 tabled a motion in the House of Commons. Despite opposition from the Conservative Home Secretary, Rab Butler, Robinson's motion attracted the support of over 150 fellow MPs within days. However, Robinson's views on the subject were much more in tune with the changing times and he was supported in his campaign by such diverse bodies as the Church of England, the Magistrates' Association and the British Medical Association. The Times (London) ran an editorial in 1958 which proclaimed "Attempted suicide seems to have become punishable in England almost by accident," when it noted suicide was not a criminal offence in Scotland. The law regarding suicide as a criminal offence in England and Wales was repealed in 1961 and Robinson's contribution to remove the stigma of suicide from the statute books cannot be overestimated.

He was also campaigner for homosexual law reform and a member of the Homosexual Law Reform Society's executive committee. In June 1960, he introduced the first full-scale Commons debate on the Wolfenden Report's proposals to end the law which criminalised consenting sex between men in private. He had also put forward a bill in 1961 to legalise abortion. His bill failed but Robinson was Minister of Health in 1967 when the Abortion Act 1967 came into force. In 1967, Robinson announced the British government's intentions to limit forms of promotional advertising for cigarettes and cigarette-coupon schemes. Matthew Hilton described him as "a persistent Labour critic of the tobacco industry". Robinson helped to put forth the 1968 Health Services and Public Health Act, which made home help service for the elderly a mandate to the government, rather than a permissive duty. Robinson was supportive of voluntary hospitals and health services, and voiced his encouragement to these institutions in a speech to the National Association of Leagues of Hospital Friends.

He later joined the Social Democratic Party.

== Other roles ==
Robinson served as Chairman of English National Opera from 1972 to 1977, of the Greater London Council's London Transport Executive from 1975 to 1978, and of the Arts Council of Great Britain from 1977 to 1982.

He was knighted in April 1983 for services to the Arts.

== Personal life and death ==
In 1941, Robinson married Elizabeth Edwards (d. 1993), and they had a daughter. Robinson died from a heart attack at the Royal Free Hospital in London on 16 February 1996, at the age of 84.

== Bibliography ==
Robinson wrote a biography of Wilkie Collins (1951), and a young person's guide to Parliament, Look at Parliament (1962).

== See also ==
- Mind (charity)
- Scientology and psychiatry
- Enquiry into the Practice and Effects of Scientology
- Believe What You Like: What happened between the Scientologists and the National Association for Mental Health

Parliament of the United Kingdom
Preceded by George House	Member of Parliament for St. Pancras North; 1949–1970	Succeeded by Albert Stallard
Preceded by Anthony Barber	Minister of Health; 1964–1968	Succeeded by Richard Crossman; Secretary of State for Social Services
Political offices
Preceded by Lord Gibson	Chair of the Arts Council of Great Britain; 1977–1982	Succeeded by William Rees-Mogg
Business positions
Preceded by Sir Richard Way	Chairman, London Transport Executive; 1975–1978	Succeeded by Ralph Bennett
