= Islington West =

Parliamentary constituency in the United Kingdom, 1885–1950

- Former borough constituency for the House of Commons

1885–1950
- Seats: one
- Created from: Finsbury
- Replaced by: Islington South West

Islington West was a borough constituency in the Metropolitan Borough of Islington, in North London.

It returned one Member of Parliament (MP) to the House of Commons of the Parliament of the United Kingdom from 1885 until it was abolished for the 1950 general election. Elections were held using the first past the post voting system.

== Boundaries ==
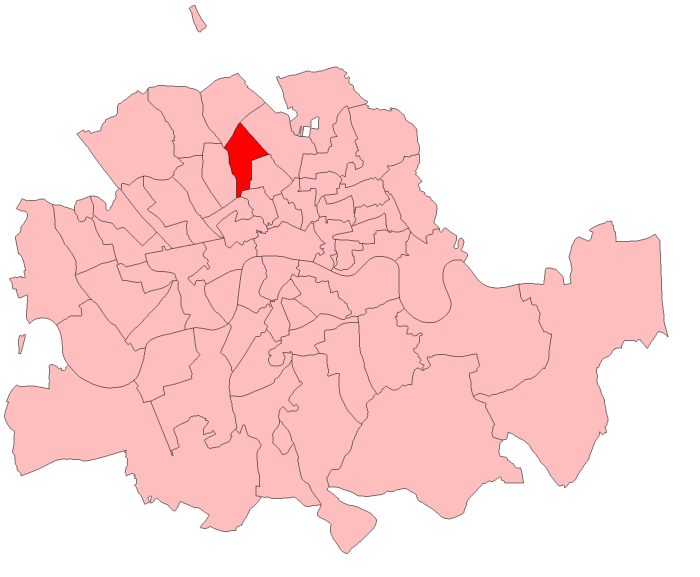
Islington West in London 1885–1918

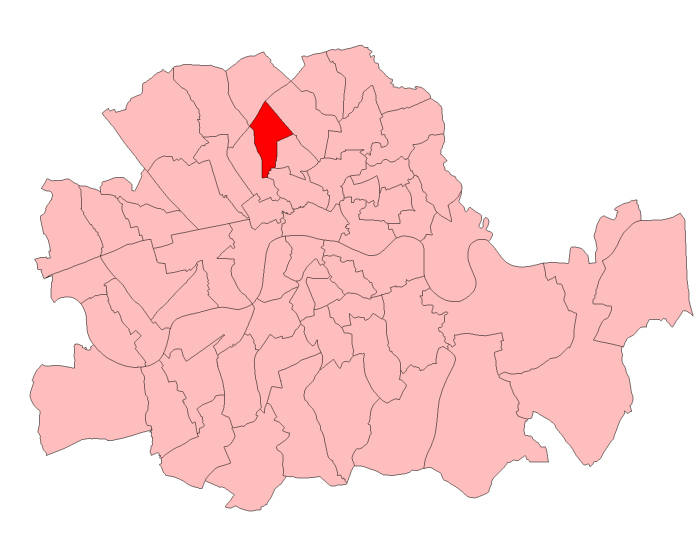
Islington West in London 1918–50

1918–1950: The Metropolitan Borough of Islington wards of Lower Holloway and Thornhill.

== Members of Parliament ==
Election	Member	Party
1885	Richard Chamberlain	Liberal
1886	Richard Chamberlain	Liberal Unionist
1892	Thomas Lough	Liberal
1918	Sir George Elliott	Unionist
1922	James Despencer-Robertson	Unionist
1923	Frederick Montague	Labour
1931	Patrick Donner	Conservative
1935	Frederick Montague	Labour
1947	Albert Evans	Labour
1950	constituency abolished: see Islington South West	

== Elections ==
=== Elections in the 1880s ===
General election 1885: Islington West
Party	Candidate	Votes	%	±%
Liberal	Richard Chamberlain	3,470	60.6	
Conservative	George Danford Thomas	2,256	39.4	
Majority		1,214	21.2	
Turnout		5,726	78.7	
Registered electors		7,276		
Liberal win (new seat)				

General election 1886: Islington West
Party	Candidate	Votes	%	±%
Liberal Unionist	Richard Chamberlain	2,793	65.0	+25.6
Liberal	William Archibald Macdonald	1,501	35.0	−25.6
Majority		1,292	30.0	N/A
Turnout		4,294	59.0	−19.7
Registered electors		7,276		
Liberal Unionist gain from Liberal		Swing	+25.6	

=== Elections in the 1890s ===
Thomas Lough

General election 1892: Islington West
Party	Candidate	Votes	%	±%
Liberal	Thomas Lough	3,385	56.0	+21.0
Liberal Unionist	Richard Chamberlain	2,655	44.0	−21.0
Majority		730	12.0	N/A
Turnout		6,040	72.2	+13.2
Registered electors		8,365		
Liberal gain from Liberal Unionist		Swing	+21.0	

General election 1895: Islington West
Party	Candidate	Votes	%	±%
Liberal	Thomas Lough	3,494	53.5	−2.5
Liberal Unionist	George Barham	3,031	46.5	+2.5
Majority		463	7.0	−5.0
Turnout		6,525	72.9	+0.7
Registered electors		8,950		
Liberal hold		Swing	−2.5	

=== Elections in the 1900s ===
General election 1900: Islington West
Party	Candidate	Votes	%	±%
Liberal	Thomas Lough	3,178	50.1	−3.4
Liberal Unionist	F H Medhurst	3,159	49.9	+3.4
Majority		19	0.2	−6.8
Turnout		6,337	69.8	−3.1
Registered electors		9,074		
Liberal hold		Swing	−3.4	

Thomas Lough

General election 1906: Islington West
Party	Candidate	Votes	%	±%
Liberal	Thomas Lough	4,116	53.2	+3.1
Liberal Unionist	F H Medhurst	3,618	46.8	−3.1
Majority		498	6.4	+6.2
Turnout		7,734	83.8	+14.0
Registered electors		9,229		
Liberal hold		Swing	+3.1	

=== Elections in the 1910s ===
General election January 1910: Islington West
Party	Candidate	Votes	%	±%
Liberal	Thomas Lough	3,768	51.7	−1.5
Liberal Unionist	Savile Crossley	3,514	48.3	+1.5
Majority		254	3.4	−3.0
Turnout		7,282	85.2	+1.4
Registered electors		8,544		
Liberal hold		Swing	−1.5	

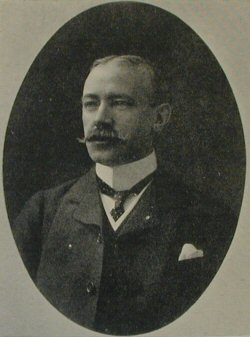
William Black

General election December 1910: Islington West
Party	Candidate	Votes	%	±%
Liberal	Thomas Lough	3,549	54.3	+2.6
Conservative	William George Black	2,985	45.7	−2.6
Majority		564	8.6	+5.2
Turnout		6,534	76.5	−8.7
Registered electors		8,544		
Liberal hold		Swing	+2.6	

General Election 1914–15:

Another General Election was required to take place before the end of 1915. The political parties had been making preparations for an election to take place and by July 1914, the following candidates had been selected;

- Liberal: Thomas Lough
- Unionist:

General election 1918: Islington West
Party		Candidate	Votes	%	±%
C	Unionist	George Elliott	4,996	45.4	−0.3
	Liberal	Thomas Lough	2,616	23.7	−30.6
	Labour	John Thomas Sheppard	2,300	20.9	New
	NFDDSS	Ernest Miles Taylor	1,105	10.0	New
Majority			2,380	21.7	N/A
Turnout			11,017	42.1	−34.6
Registered electors			26,197		
	Unionist gain from Liberal		Swing	+15.2	
C indicates candidate endorsed by the coalition government.

=== Elections in the 1920s ===
General election 1922: Islington West
Party	Candidate	Votes	%	±%
Unionist	James Despencer-Robertson	7,335	38.9	−6.5
Liberal	Henry Mills	6,643	35.3	+11.6
Labour	W. J. Lewington	4,856	25.8	+4.9
Majority		692	3.6	−18.1
Turnout		18,834	57.5	+15.4
Registered electors		32,775		
Unionist hold		Swing	−9.1	

General election 1923: Islington West
Party	Candidate	Votes	%	±%
Labour	Frederick Montague	7,955	41.4	+15.6
Unionist	James Despencer-Robertson	5,829	30.3	−8.6
Liberal	Joseph William Molden	5,443	28.3	−7.0
Majority		2,126	11.1	N/A
Turnout		19,227	57.7	+0.2
Registered electors		33,351		
Labour gain from Unionist		Swing	+12.1	

General election 1924: Islington West
Party	Candidate	Votes	%	±%
Labour	Frederick Montague	10,174	45.3	+3.9
Unionist	James Despencer-Robertson	9,499	42.3	+12.0
Liberal	Joseph William Molden	2,780	12.4	−15.9
Majority		675	3.0	−8.1
Turnout		22,453	67.2	+9.5
Registered electors		33,427		
Labour hold		Swing	−4.1	

General election 1929: Islington West
Party	Candidate	Votes	%	±%
Labour	Frederick Montague	13,768	55.2	+9.9
Unionist	James Despencer-Robertson	6,921	27.7	−14.6
Liberal	David Eifion Puleston Evans	4,267	17.1	+4.7
Majority		6,847	27.5	+24.5
Turnout		24,956	60.2	−7.0
Registered electors		41,466		
Labour hold		Swing	+12.3	

=== Elections in the 1930s ===
General election 1931: Islington West
Party	Candidate	Votes	%	±%
Conservative	Patrick Donner	14,487	59.22	
Labour	Frederick Montague	9,977	40.78	
Majority		4,510	18.44	N/A
Turnout		24,464	58.00	
Conservative gain from Labour		Swing		

General election 1935: Islington West
Party	Candidate	Votes	%	±%
Labour	Frederick Montague	11,340	55.00	
Conservative	Frederick Ponsonby	9,280	45.00	
Majority		2,060	10.00	N/A
Turnout		20,620	52.63	
Labour gain from Conservative		Swing		

General Election 1939–40

Another General Election was required to take place before the end of 1940. The political parties had been making preparations for an election to take place and by the Autumn of 1939, the following candidates had been selected;

- Labour: Frederick Montague
- Conservative: ET Hope
- Liberal: WC Woodroofe

=== Elections in the 1940s ===
General election 1945: Islington West
Party	Candidate	Votes	%	±%
Labour	Frederick Montague	11,496	73.8	+18.8
Conservative	E.T. Hope	4,090	26.2	−18.8
Majority		7,406	47.6	+37.6
Turnout		15,586	60.1	+7.5
Labour hold		Swing	+18.8	

1947 Islington West by-election
Party	Candidate	Votes	%	±%
Labour	Albert Evans	8,760	57.2	−16.6
Conservative	Tom Howard	4,084	26.6	+0.4
Liberal	Edwin Malindine	2,459	16.0	New
Independent	L.J. Wildman	33	0.2	New
Majority		4,676	30.6	−17.0
Turnout		15,336	51.4	−8.7
Labour hold		Swing	-8.5	

== See also ==
- List of parliamentary constituencies in Islington
