= Albert Rollit =

British politician

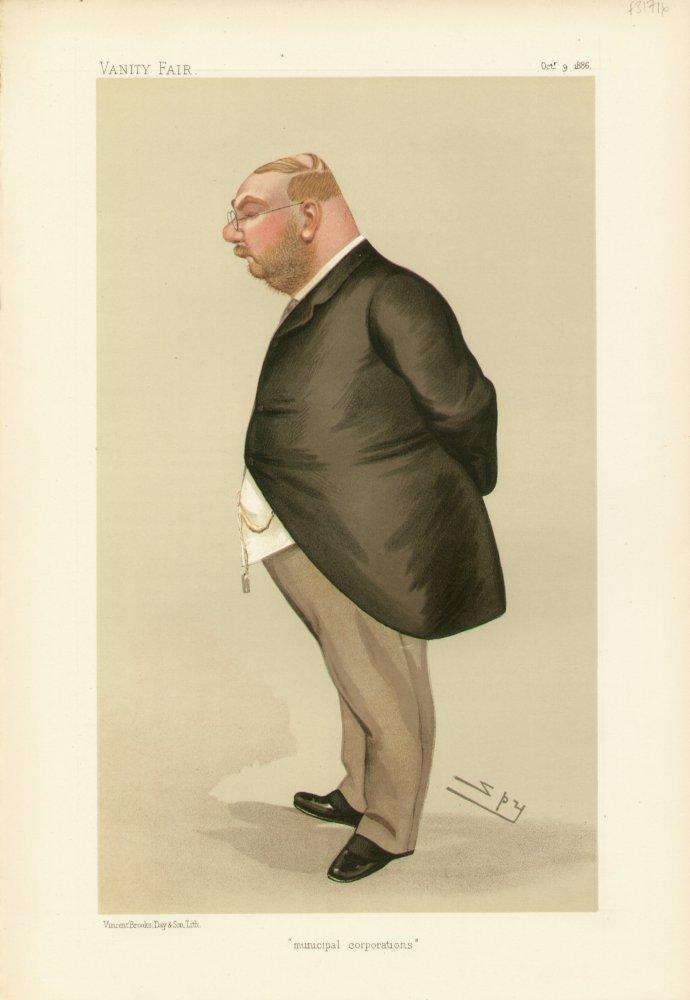
"municipal corporations". Caricature by Spy published in Vanity Fair in 1886.

Sir Albert Kaye Rollit (1842 – 12 August 1922) was a British politician, lawyer, and businessman.

== Career ==
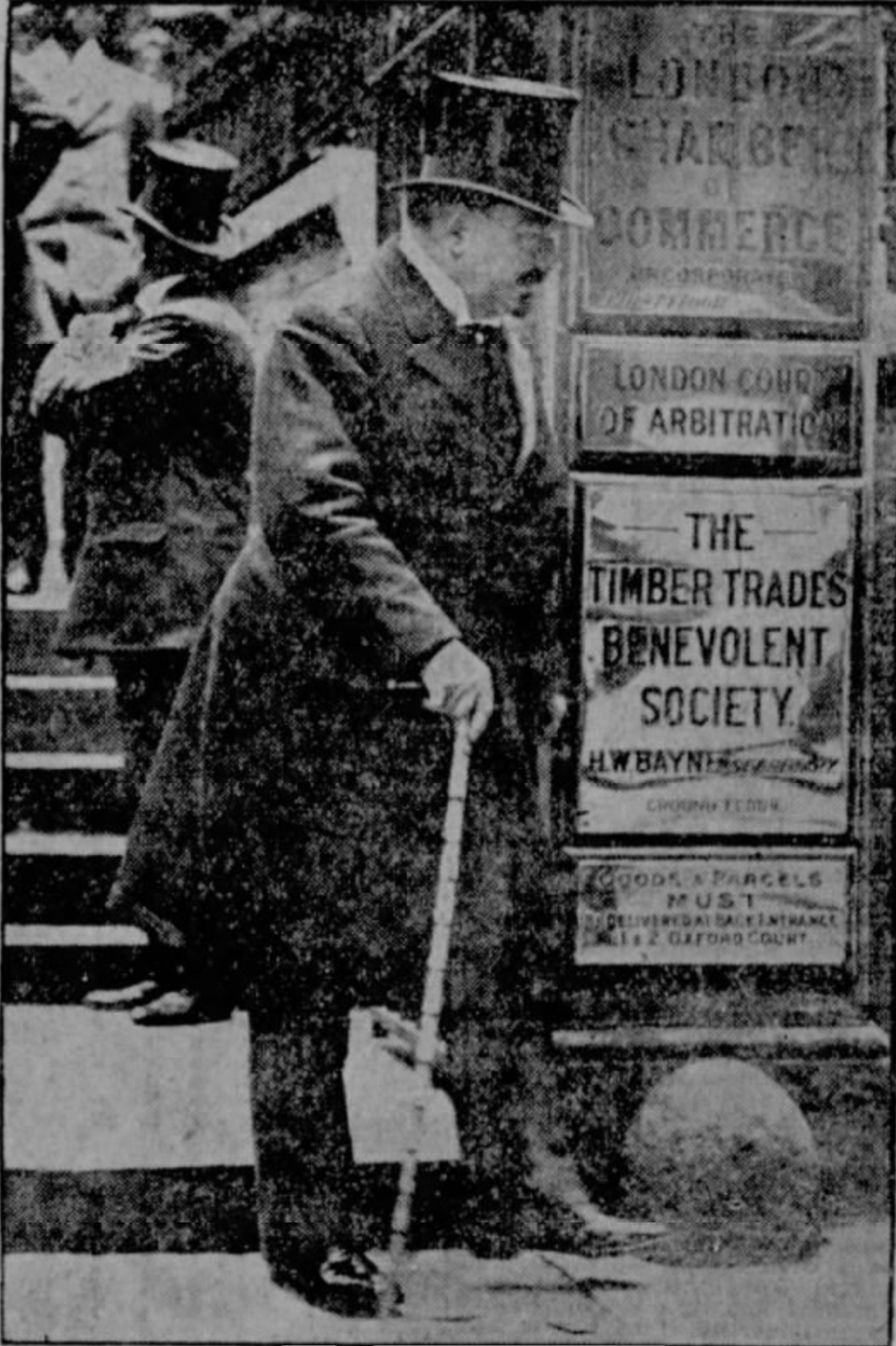

Born in Hull, he became a solicitor and went on to become president of the Law Society. He later became a shipowner. He was Mayor of Hull from 1883 to 1885. In 1886, he was elected as a Conservative Member of Parliament for the South Islington constituency. In 1892 he put forward a private member's bill in favour of women's suffrage, which failed narrowly. Having opposed Chamberlain's Tariff Reform proposals, he was defeated in the 1906 general election, and failed to get elected as a Liberal in Epsom in 1910. As a businessman he was well known on the Continent of Europe and acted as consul-general for Romania from 1911 until his death. He was also a magistrate in Berkshire, where he resided at Sutherland Grange at Dedworth, adjoining Windsor, with his second wife.

He received the honorary degree Doctor of Laws (LL.D.) from the Victoria University of Manchester in February 1902, in connection with the 50th jubilee celebrations of the establishment of the university. He was elected a Fellow of the Royal Horticultural Society in 1902.

In 1902, Rollit received the decoration Officer of the Legion d'honeur from the French Republic in recognition of his services towards the development of commercial relations between the United Kingdom and France, and especially for his services in connection with the Universal Exhibition of 1900.

In 1911 he served as an arbitrator of the massive nationwide English strikes.

== Personal life ==
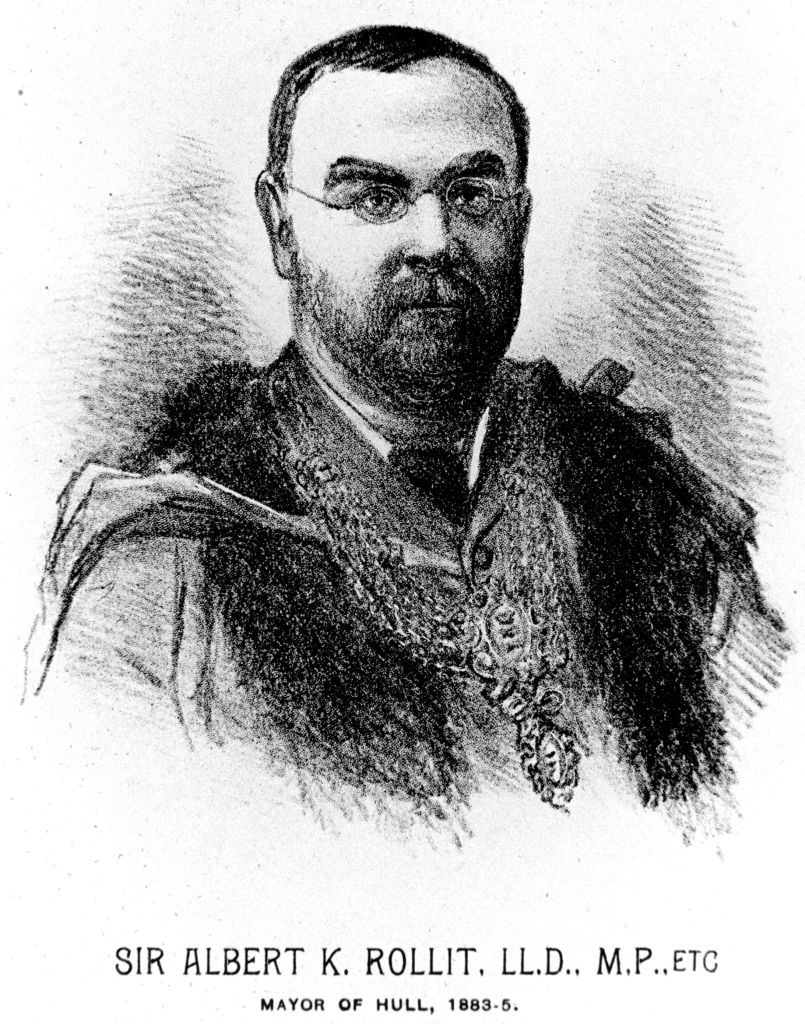
Rollit

Rollit married twice. His second wife was Mary, Dowager Duchess of Sutherland. He was her third husband. In 1898 her jewellery, then valued at £30,000, was stolen by international jewel-thief William Johnson, known as 'Harry the Valet'. Johnson stole the jewellery while she was travelling by train from Paris to London with her husband, (Rollit), her brother, his wife and the Duchess's footman and maid. The case was investigated by Inspectors Walter Dew, Walter Dinnie and Frank Froest.

He had a daughter; Emma Rollit, who married a Captain Richard Todd Ellison of the 2nd Life Guards at St Paul's Church, Knightsbridge, London on 7 November 1886.

== Honours ==
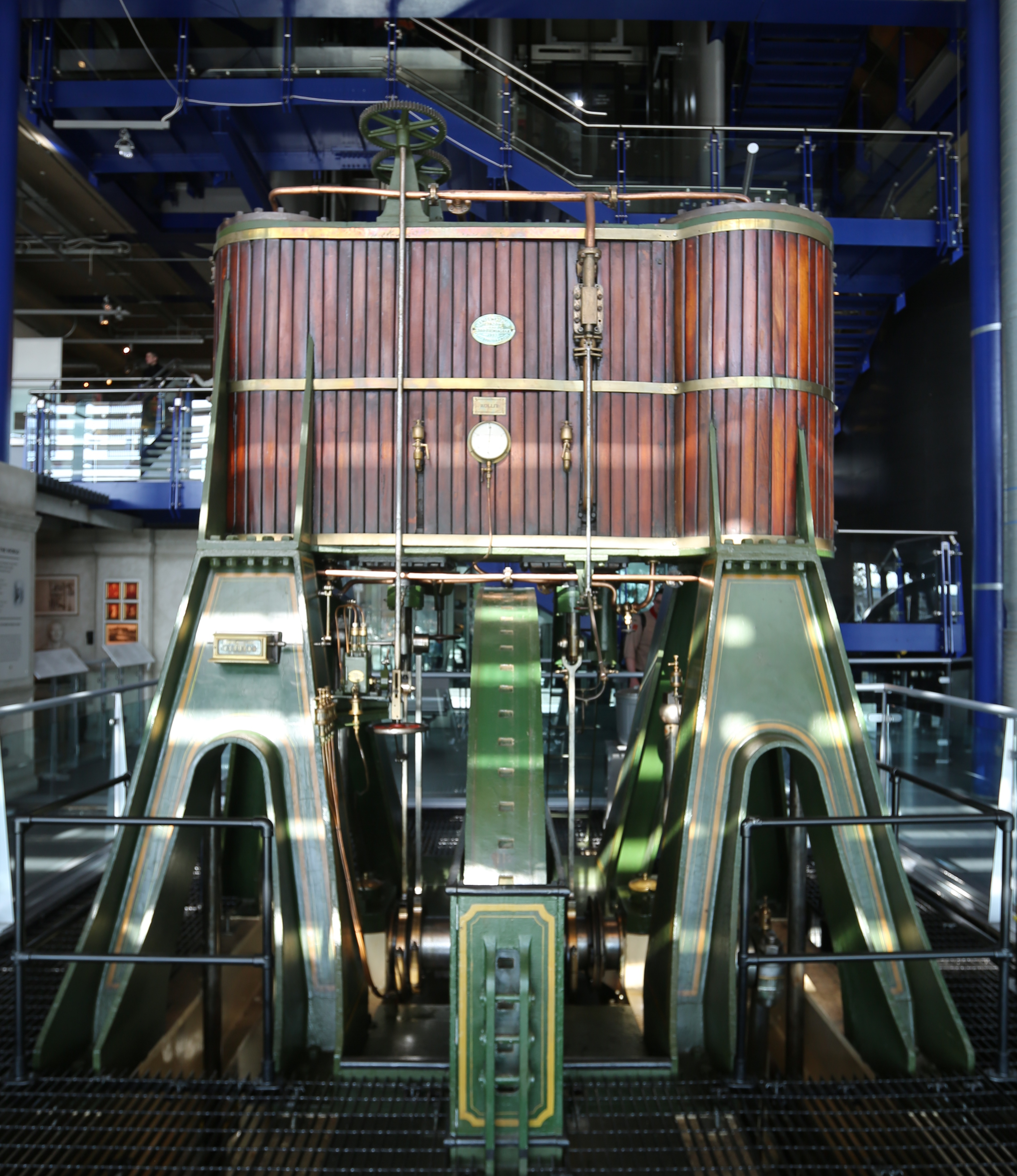
The Rollit engine at Thinktank, Birmingham Science Museum

The Rollit steam pumping engine, built in 1883, and which formerly pumped sewage at Hull, was named in his honour. It is now preserved at Thinktank, Birmingham Science Museum, and carries a brass plaque bearing the name.

Parliament of the United Kingdom
Preceded by Henry Spicer	Member of Parliament for Islington South; 1886–1906	Succeeded by Thomas Wiles
Party political offices
Preceded by Ellis Ashmead-Bartlett	Chairman of the National Union of Conservative and Constitutional Associations; 1889	Succeeded by Frederick Dixon-Hartland
