= Patrick Donner =

British politician

Sir Patrick William Donner (4 December 1904 – 19 August 1988) was a British member of parliament (MP) and a member of the influential Finland-Swedish Donner family.

His family moved from Helsinki, Finland, to London in 1919. His mother was Scottish Violet McHutchen and his father was Ossian Donner, who headed Finland's first diplomatic mission in London 1919 to 1925. The family later settled in England for good, and his father became a British citizen.

Donner studied English literature at Exeter College, Oxford and later entered business. He was elected at the 1931 election as Conservative MP for Islington West. The seat being marginal, Donner was selected for the safe Conservative seat of Basingstoke for the 1935 election against the wishes of Conservative Central Office, who preferred Sir Francis Oswald Lindley. The papers of Sir Henry Maxence Cavendish Drummond Wolff appear to indicate that Sir Oswald Mosley interviewed Donner to decide upon his suitability to serve as MP for the Basingstoke constituency, which had previously been held by two right-wing Conservatives, Drummond Wolff and Viscount Lymington.

Donner also featured as writer for New Pioneer, an antisemitic and pro-German journal bankrolled by Lymington and closely linked to the British People's Party.

In Parliament, Donner was active on British Empire and Indian policy, playing an important part in the India Defence League. He served in the Royal Air Force during World War II and was knighted in the 1953 Coronation Honours. He served as Basingstoke's MP for 20 years, stepping down at the 1955 election. He was High Sheriff of Hampshire in 1967.

Donner's memoirs, Crusade: A Life Against the Calamitous Twentieth Century, were released in 1984.

Parliament of the United Kingdom
Preceded by Frederick Montague	Member of Parliament for Islington West; 1931–1935	Succeeded by Frederick Montague
Preceded by Henry Maxence Cavendish Drummond Wolff	Member of Parliament for Basingstoke; 1935 – 1955	Succeeded by Denzil Freeth
