= 1949 St Pancras North by-election =

UK parliamentary by-election

A by-election for the constituency of St Pancras North in the United Kingdom House of Commons was held on 10 March 1949, caused by the resignation of the incumbent Labour MP George House. The result was a hold for the Labour Party, with their candidate Kenneth Robinson.

== Result ==
St Pancras North by-election, 1949
Party	Candidate	Votes	%	±%
Labour	Kenneth Robinson	16,185	57.5	−6.3
Conservative	N S Shields	11,118	39.5	+4.8
Communist	John Mahon	854	3.0	New
Majority		5,067	18.0	−11.1
Turnout		28,157	65.1	−5.9
Labour hold		Swing		

== Previous result ==
General election 1945: St Pancras North
Party	Candidate	Votes	%	±%
Labour	George House	16,738	63.8	+21.5
Conservative	Robert Grant-Ferris	9,108	34.7	−19.0
Independent	JB Gilmour	403	1.5	New
Majority		7,630	29.1	N/A
Turnout		26,249	71.1	+2.7
Labour hold		Swing		
