= Baron Amwell =

Title in the Peerage of the United Kingdom

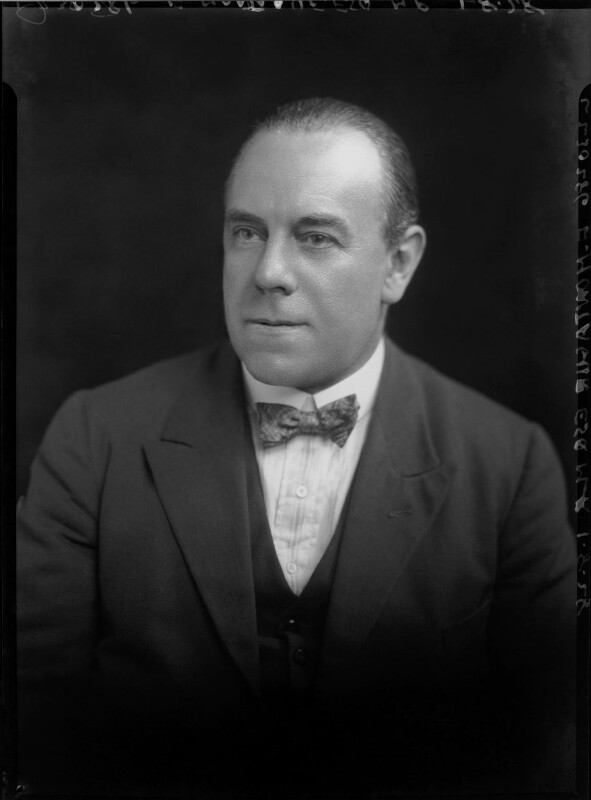
Frederick Montague, 1st Baron Amwell of Islington, photographed in 1928

Baron Amwell, of Islington in the County of London, is a title in the Peerage of the United Kingdom. It was created on 16 July 1947 for the Labour politician Frederick Montague. He had previously represented Islington West in the House of Commons and served as Under-Secretary of State for Air from 1929 to 1931. As of 2025 the title is held by his great-grandson, the fourth Baron, who succeeded his father in 2024.

== Barons Amwell (1947) ==
- Frederick Montague, 1st Baron Amwell (1876–1966)
- Frederick Norman Montague, 2nd Baron Amwell (1912–1990)
- Keith Norman Montague, 3rd Baron Amwell (1943–2024)
- Ian Keith Montague, 4th Baron Amwell (born 1973)

The heir apparent is the present holder's son the Hon. Oliver Montague (born 2007)
