= Thomas Lough =

Irish-British politician

Thomas Lough c1895

Thomas Lough c1905

The Rt. Hon. Thomas Lough, P.C. (1850 – 11 January 1922), was an Anglo-Irish radical Liberal Party politician.

He was born in County Cavan, Ireland, to Mathew Lough and Martha Steel, and was educated at The Royal School in Cavan Town and at Wesleyan Connexional School, Dublin.

He worked as a tea merchant in London from 1880. He was an unsuccessful Liberal candidate for Truro at the 1886 general election and in 1888 appointed Ramsay MacDonald as a private secretary. Lough was Liberal member of parliament (MP) for Islington West from 1892 until 1918. He was Parliamentary Secretary to the Board of Education from 1905 until 1908.

Thomas along with his younger brother Arthur Steel Lough were pioneers of the Drummully Agricultural Co-operative & Dairy Society in 1896, later to become Killeshandra Co-operative Agricultural Dairy Society and progressed to become one of Ireland's leading dairy companies, now internationally known as Lakeland Dairies.

He was Lord Lieutenant of Cavan from 1907 until his death, and was appointed a Privy Counsellor in 1908. As part of the former position, he was Custos Rotulorum for County Cavan

== Sources ==
- Who Was Who

Parliament of the United Kingdom
Preceded by Richard Chamberlain	Member of Parliament for Islington West; 1892–1918	Succeeded by Sir George Elliott
Political offices
Preceded by Sir William Anson	Parliamentary Secretary to the Board of Education; 1905–1908	Succeeded by Thomas McKinnon Wood
Honorary titles
Preceded by Edward James Saunderson	Lord Lieutenant of Cavan; 1907–1922	Office abolished
