= Henry Spicer =

Henry Spicer (1837 – 18 October 1915) was an English stationer and Liberal politician.

Spicer was born at Islington, the son of Henry Spicer and his wife Sarah. His father was a wholesale stationer of the firm of Spicer Bros. Spicer received a congregationalist education at Mill Hill School, and New College, St. John's Wood. He graduated at the University of London and joined the wholesale stationery business. He was a J.P. for Middlesex, and a Member of London School Board.

In the 1885 general election, Spicer was elected Member of Parliament for Islington South but lost the seat in the 1886 general election. Spicer's wife Lucy was from Calcutta.

Parliament of the United Kingdom
New constituency	Member of Parliament for Islington South; 1885–1886	Succeeded by Albert Rollit
