= Fred Montague, 1st Baron Amwell =

British politician

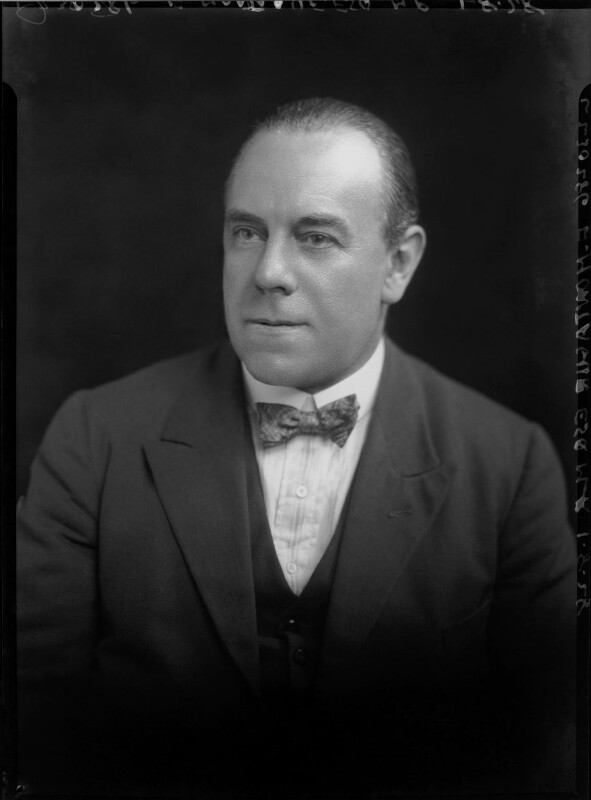
- Born: 8 October 1876
- Died: 15 October 1966 (aged 90)

Frederick Montague, 1st Baron Amwell, CBE (8 October 1876 – 15 October 1966) was a British Labour Party politician.

Amwell was the son of John Montague and Mary Ann Manderson. His birth was registered in Holborn, Middlesex in the fourth quarter of 1876. He worked as a newsboy and as a shop assistant and later became a copywriter and political agent. He served in the First World War, achieving the rank of Lieutenant in the 1st Battalion of the Northamptonshire Regiment. After the war he was an Alderman of the Islington Council between 1919 and 1925. In 1923 Amwell was elected to the House of Commons as Member of Parliament (MP) for Islington West, a seat he held until 1931 and again from 1935 to 1947, and served under Ramsay MacDonald as Under-Secretary of State for Air from 1927 to 1931. He did not serve in the National Government but held office in Winston Churchill's war coalition as Parliamentary Secretary to the Ministry of Transport from 1940 to 1941 and to the Ministry of Aircraft Production from 1941 to 1942. He was made a CBE in 1946 and in 1947 he was raised to the peerage as Baron Amwell, of Islington in the County of London.

Lord Amwell married Constance Mary, daughter of James Craig, in 1911. They had one son and two daughters. Lady Amwell died in 1964. Amwell survived her by two years and died in October 1966, aged 90. He was succeeded in the barony by his only son Frederick.

Montague was a keen magician and served as a vice-president of London's Magicians' Club. He wrote Westminster Wizardry, a book on magic tricks.

Parliament of the United Kingdom
Preceded by James Despencer-Robertson	Member of Parliament for Islington West; 1923 – 1931	Succeeded by Patrick William Donner
Preceded by Patrick William Donner	Member of Parliament for Islington West; 1935 – 1947	Succeeded by Albert Evans
Peerage of the United Kingdom
New creation	Baron Amwell; 1947–1966	Succeeded by Frederick Norman Montague
