= Charles Garland (British politician) =

British politician and chemist

Charles Samuel Garland FRIC FIC (23 June 1887 – 6 December 1960) was a British Conservative Party politician and chemist.

Born in Stourbridge, Worcestershire, he was the son of Charles Garland and his Annie née Mayo. He was educated at Wilson's School, Camberwell and the Royal College of Science. He graduated with a Bachelor of Science degree from the University of London, subsequently becoming an Associate of the Royal College of Science, a Fellow of the Royal Institute of Chemistry and Chartered Member of the Institution of Chemical Engineers.

At the 1922 general election he was elected as Conservative member of parliament for Islington South but lost his seat when a further election was held in the following year.

For the rest of his life he was involved in the chemical industry. From 1925 to 1951, he was vice president and honorary treasurer of the National Union of Manufacturers and its president from 1956 to 1958. He also held the office of president of the British Association of Chemists in 1925-26 and of the Institution of Chemical Engineers in 1941–42. He was also a crown governor and fellow of the Imperial College of Science and Technology.

Parliament of the United Kingdom
Preceded by Charles Frederick Higham	Member of Parliament for Islington South; 1922–1923	Succeeded by William Sampson Cluse
