= Lord Lieutenant of Cavan =

Ceremonial officer in Cavan, Ireland

This is a list of people who have served as Lord-Lieutenant of Cavan.

There were lieutenants of counties in Ireland until the reign of James II, when they were renamed governors. The office of Lord Lieutenant was recreated on 23 August 1831, and is pronounced as 'Lord Lef-tenant'. The Lord Lieutenant also acted as Custos Rotulorum for the county.

== Governors ==
- Charles Coote, 1st Earl of Bellomont
- John Maxwell, 2nd Earl of Farnham
- John Maxwell-Barry, 5th Baron Farnham: 1805–1831

== Lord Lieutenants ==
- Thomas Taylour, 2nd Marquess of Headfort: 17 October 1831 – 6 December 1870
- John Young, 1st Baron Lisgar: 3 April 1871 – 6 October 1876
- John Butler, 6th Earl of Lanesborough: 18 December 1876 – July 1900
- Somerset Maxwell, 10th Baron Farnham: 18 July 1900 – 22 November 1900
- Colonel Edward James Saunderson: 21 December 1900 – 21 October 1906
- Thomas Lough: 15 March 1907 – 11 January 1922
