= Thomas Wiles =

Thomas Wiles MP, circa 1906

Thomas Wiles (19 June 1861 – 18 May 1951) was a British Liberal Party politician.

== Family ==
He was the youngest son of Joseph Wiles of St Albans. He married in 1890, Winifred Alice Crassweller of Highbury. They had one son and two daughters. He was educated at Amersham Hall School.

== Business career ==
He was Life Governor of Joseph Wiles & Son, Ltd, grain merchants, of Mark Lane, London. He was Chairman of the Corn Exchange. He was Chairman of the Anglo-Portuguese Colonial and Overseas Bank, Ltd.

== Political career ==
He was elected to the London County Council for South-West Bethnal Green in a by-election 3 February 1900, and took his seat the following week. For some years he was Whip to the Progressive party. He was Chairman of the Port of London Authority. He was Chairman of the Royal Surgical Aid Society. He was Liberal MP for Islington South in 1906–18. He was Parliamentary Private Secretary to Thomas McKinnon Wood when he was Under-Secretary of State for Foreign Affairs in 1908–11, continuing until 1912 while Wood served as Financial Secretary to the Treasury. He was Secretary to the London Liberal MPs. He was made a member of the Privy Council of the United Kingdom in 1916. He was a Justice of the Peace in Oxfordshire. His parliamentary career ended when he lost his Islington South seat in 1918 when the Coalition Government coupon was given to his Unionist opponent. He attempted a return to parliament at the 1922 General Election, again at Islington South, but in a close three-way contest, he finished second. His final parliamentary contest came at Eastbourne, at the 1923 General Election, when he finished second.

Parliament of the United Kingdom
Preceded by Albert Rollit	Member of Parliament for Islington South; 1906–1918	Succeeded by Charles Frederick Higham
