= George Dew (politician) =

British politician and trade unionist (1853 or 1854–1931)

George Dew (1853 or 1854 – 5 April 1931) was a British politician and trade unionist, who served on London County Council.

Dew worked as a carpenter, and became prominent in the Amalgamated Society of Carpenters and Joiners. Through it, he won a seat on the executive of the London Trades Council, and he also served on Lambeth Metropolitan Borough Council. In later years, he served as secretary of the London Building Industries' Federation.

In 1898, Dew was appointed as an alderman on London County Council. He also served on the Metropolitan Water Board, as secretary of the National Association for the Extension of Workmen's Trains and Trams, and as president of the Hearts of Oak Friendly Society.

Dew was a supporter of the Labour Party, which adopted him as a potential candidate for the 1906 UK general election, but he failed to be selected to contest a seat. At the 1904 London County Council election, he switched to a seat in Islington South, which he held until he retired in 1925.
