= Constructional Engineering Union =

Former trade union of the United Kingdom

- Merged into: Amalgamated Union of Engineering Workers
- Founded: 1924
- Dissolved: 1971
- Headquarters: Lower Marsh, London
- Location: United Kingdom
- Members: 5,500
- Key people: George House
- Affiliations: TUC, STUC, NFBTO, Labour

The Constructional Engineering Union (CEU) was a trade union representing steel erectors and other workers involved in steel construction in the United Kingdom.

== History ==
The union was founded in 1924 as a section of the Iron and Steel Trades Confederation (ISTC). It left the ISTC and became an independent union in 1930. In 1971, the union merged with the Amalgamated Union of Engineering and Foundry Workers to form the Amalgamated Union of Engineering Workers, becoming the largely autonomous construction section of the new union.

== Election results ==
The union sponsored a successful Labour Party candidate in several Parliamentary elections.

Election	Constituency	Candidate	Votes	Percentage	Position
1964 general election	Bothwell	James Hamilton	27,556	60.4	1
1966 general election	Bothwell	James Hamilton	27,166	61.0	1
1970 general election	Bothwell	James Hamilton	26,431	54.7	1

== General Secretaries ==
1924: George House
1939: Jack Stanley
1957: Ernie Patterson
1968: Eddie Marsden
