= George Elliott (British politician) =

British politician

Sir George Elliott

Member of Parliament for Islington West
- In office 1918–1922
- Preceded by: Thomas Lough
- Succeeded by: James Despencer-Robertson

Personal details
- Born: 1847
- Died: 4 May 1925 (aged 77–78)
- Party: Conservative
- Other political affiliations: Coalition Coupon (1918); Moderate Party (London) (former); Progressive Party (London) (former)
- Spouse: Elizabeth
- Children: 6

Sir George Samuel Elliott (1847 – 4 May 1925) was a British businessman and politician.

== Career ==
Born in Islington, he was educated at the City of London School and entered business as a refreshment contractor with premises at Upper Street. In 1875, he was elected to Islington Vestry. He subsequently became a member of the Islington Board of Guardians: during his 38 years membership he was chairman for 20 years and vice-chairman for 9.

When the first elections to the London County Council were held in January 1889, Elliott was elected as one of two councillors representing Islington South. Originally a member of the Liberal-backed Progressive Party, he was re-elected in 1892 and 1895. There was some doubt as to his party allegiance by the time of the 1898 election: as a Unionist he was seen as being aligned to the Conservative supported opposition Moderate Party, although he was nominated by the Progressives. He was later described as an "Independent Progressive", and at the 1901 election was returned unopposed, taking the Moderate whip. He stood at the 1904 council election as an independent, but was defeated.

Elliott was elected to the Islington Borough Council as a Conservative, and was thirteen times mayor of Islington: in 1902/03, from 1906–09, and from 1910–18. As mayor during the First World War he was largely responsible for raising the 21st (Service) Battalion (Islington), The Middlesex Regiment. He was knighted in 1917.

At the 1918 general election he was elected as Coalition Conservative Member of Parliament for Islington West. He retired from parliament at the next general election in 1922.

== Personal life ==
He married Elizabeth Frances Hellier, Upottery, Devon and the couple had six children.

== Death ==
He died suddenly at his home "The Chalkpit", Maidenhead, Berkshire, in 1925. He was buried at Abney Park Cemetery. in plot ref. L08 Grave 079852

Parliament of the United Kingdom
Preceded by Thomas Lough	Member of Parliament for Islington West; 1918–1922	Succeeded by James Despencer-Robertson
Civic offices
Preceded by William Crump	Mayor of Islington; 1902–1903	Succeeded by Andrew Mitchell Torrance
Preceded by Henry Mills	Mayor of Islington; 1906–1909	Succeeded by Henry James Clarke
Preceded by Henry James Clarke	Mayor of Islington; 1910–1919	Succeeded by Ernest Henry King
