= Charles Higham (biographer) =

English writer

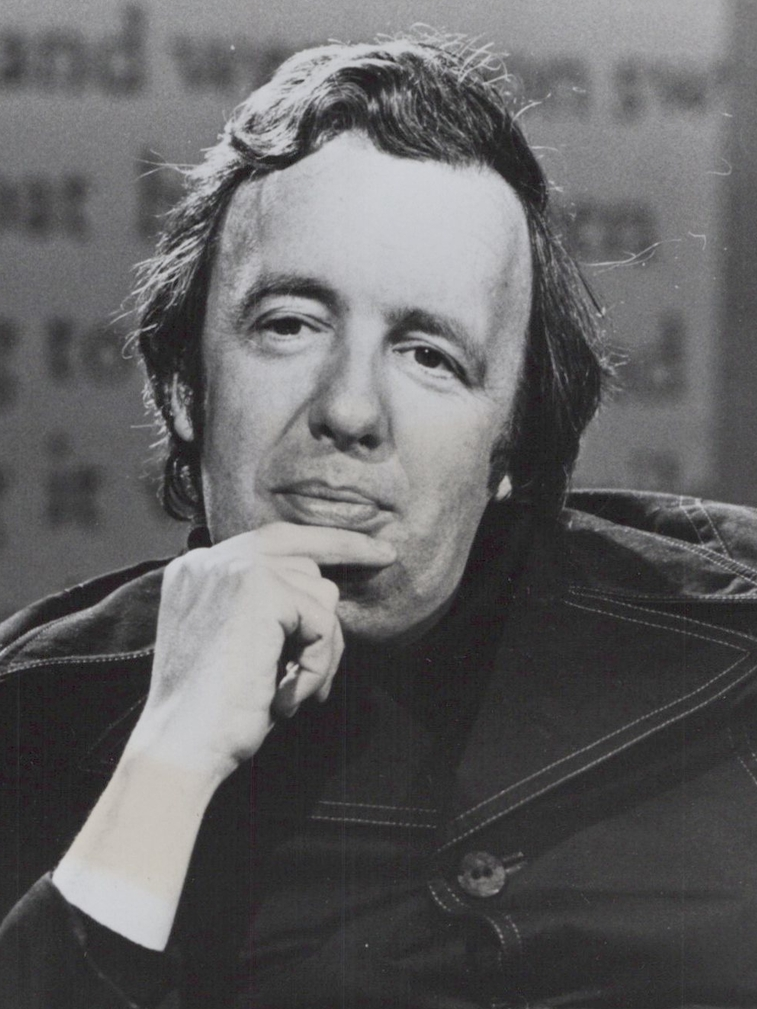
Higham in 1972

Charles Higham (/ˈhaɪəm/; 18 February 1931 – 21 April 2012) was an English author, editor and poet.

After moving to Australia in 1954, Higham began a career in journalism before moving to the United States in 1969. In the United States, he became known as a celebrity biographer, mainly of film stars, such as Katharine Hepburn and Errol Flynn. The latter book, among several during Higham's career, was criticized for fabrications. Close friends of another of his subjects, Orson Welles, in particular Peter Bogdanovich, were critical of Higham's interpretation of his career.

== Early life and career ==
Born in London, Higham was the son of former MP and advertising mogul Sir Charles Higham and his fourth wife, Josephine Janet Keuchenius Webb. Higham's parents divorced when he was three, and thereafter Charles lived with his mother. His father died four years later. After Sir Charles' death the family lived in modest circumstances during and after World War II. Higham published two books of verse in England, before moving to Sydney, Australia in 1954. There he became a journalist and critic for The Sydney Morning Herald and, later, the Sydney Daily Mirror. Higham became literary editor of The Bulletin, the country's leading weekly, in 1964, and published three more collections of verse.

In the 1960s, Higham compiled a number of horror anthologies for the Australian publisher Horwitz. The majority of stories in the anthologies were by writers from the US and UK, with many being reprinted from Montague Summers's 1936 anthology The Grimoire and Other Supernatural Stories. Australian writer Terry Dowling acknowledged the influence of Higham's horror anthologies on his own writing in an essay published in Stephen Jones Horror: Another 100 Best Books.

== Biographies ==
Higham was a regents' professor for a short time in 1969 at UC Santa Cruz. While there he claimed to have found lost footage of It's All True, Orson Welles's uncompleted Latin American triptych of more than a quarter century before. The footage was already known to the studio archivists.

In The Films of Orson Welles (1970) and in Orson Welles: The Rise and Fall of an American Genius (1985), he said that Welles suffered from a "fear of completion" that led him to abandon projects when they were nearly finished because others could then be blamed for their flaws. Friends of Welles, in particular Peter Bogdanovich, criticized this thesis; some writers have found it insightful. "It is a facile explanation," wrote Joseph McBride in 1993, "that leaves out much in the way of historical and cultural context but nevertheless contains a germ of truth." In the 1970s, he contributed freelance articles on film to The New York Times, and was a frequent guest on talk shows.

Higham's first bestseller was Kate (1975), the first authorized biography of Katharine Hepburn. This success was followed by Bette: the Life of Bette Davis, a biography of Lucille Ball, and The Duchess of Windsor (1988, 2005). In the book about Wallis Simpson (later the Duchess of Windsor), he claimed she had learned unusual sexual practices in the brothels of Peking and was the lover of Count Ciano and Ribbentrop. Journalist Paul Foot described Higham's biography of Wallis Simpson in the London Review of Books as "an important book. But there is a great deal wrong with it. He has provided his critics with plenty of hostages. Again and again, he quotes the most scurrilous and unlikely gossip, without proving it."

According to Higham and Roy Moseley in their biography of Cary Grant (1989), the actor was on the grounds of the home of actress Sharon Tate on the night in 1969 that she was murdered. Higham admitted in an interview that the association was "poorly documented." The book suffered from many contradictory statements. In a reference to Sophia Loren, Higham described Loren as Grant's former lover four pages after indicating they did not have a physical relationship. Barbara Shulgasser, in The New York Times wrote that the book's "obsession with Grant's sexuality is more a reflection of the authors' keen perception of what sells books than of any allegiance to the dictates of ethical journalism."

After the publication of Higham's book Howard Hughes, according to Margalit Fox of The New York Times, "his assertions that Hughes had a romance with Cary Grant, was centrally involved in Watergate, offering material assistance to some of the conspirators, and quite possibly died of AIDS all raised eyebrows in the news media." The work became the basis of Martin Scorsese's film The Aviator (2004). Higham's Trading with the Enemy: The Nazi American Money Plot 1933-1949 and American Swastika: The Shocking Story of Nazi Collaborators in Our Midst From 1933 to the Present Day presented his claims about the US industry's links with Nazi Germany. He wrote in a tabloid style of investigative journalism. He also published Sisters: The Story of Olivia de Havilland and Joan Fontaine in 1984, about the long running feud between the sister-actresses. He also wrote The Art of the American Film and a biography of Florenz Ziegfeld.

Higham also wrote Murder in Hollywood: Solving a Silent Screen Mystery on the death of William Desmond Taylor and a biography of Jennie Churchill, Dark Lady: Winston Churchill's Mother and Her World (2006).

With Roy Moseley (b. 1938), in addition to the book on Cary Grant, he wrote biographies of Merle Oberon, and Queen Elizabeth II and Prince Philip, Duke of Edinburgh (Elizabeth and Philip: The Untold Story 1991).

Higham published his autobiography, In and Out of Hollywood: A Biographer's Memoir, in 2009, which was both criticized as "unashamedly self-promoting" and praised as "very good" and unsparing of himself.

Higham had his share of detractors. The Daily Telegraph called Higham "a much-feared and notoriously bitchy celebrity biographer whose works fell squarely in the 'unauthorised' category." The British newspaper also observed that "critics remarked on how much of his work was based on the testimony of anonymous witnesses" and that Higham repeatedly mined "the themes of fascism, closet homosexuality and sexual perversion." The Sydney Morning Herald remarked that Higham's writing style veered "from scholarship to sensationalism... but his wealth of new details were often newsworthy.... Higham never lost the ability to irritate to get a good story. In this sense he was the best kind of gadfly as a journalist."

=== Errol Flynn controversy ===
In 1980, Higham's "most sensational work," Errol Flynn: The Untold Story appeared. In this biography he alleged that Errol Flynn was a fascist sympathizer, who spied for the Nazis before and during World War II and a bisexual who had affairs with many men. "I don't have a document that says A, B, C, D, E, Errol Flynn was a Nazi agent," Higham said in an interview, "But I have pieced together a mosaic that proves that he is." Lawrence S. Dietz in his New York Times review at the time of the book's first publication complained about the writer's "shoddy reporting, about the must-have-happeneds that Mr. Higham constructs to use material contained in the documents he has read." James Wolcott, writing for The New York Review of Books, described the biography's preoccupation with the subject's sex life as "keyhole-peeping porn, written by a man whose mind has turned to pulp." Members of Flynn's family unsuccessfully sued Higham and the book's publisher for libel, a claim which was dismissed on appeal in 1983 because the suit was on behalf of someone who was deceased.

Tony Thomas, in Errol Flynn: The Spy Who Never Was (Citadel, 1990) and Buster Wiles in My Days With Errol Flynn: The Autobiography of a Stuntman (Roundtable, 1988) identified Higham's claims as fabrications, an assertion substantiated by viewing the FBI documents, which were altered – rather than quoted verbatim – by Higham. In 2000 Higham restated his claim that Flynn had been a German agent, which he said was corroborated by Anne Lane, secretary to MI5 chief Sir Percy Sillitoe from 1946 to 1951, who had been responsible for maintaining Flynn's file there (although he never saw the file, and could not even confirm its physical existence); and also by journalist Gerry Brown, who said he had been briefed by the Ministry of Defence.

== Personal life ==
In his autobiography, Higham claimed he was molested by his stepmother and says he entered into his 1952 marriage even though he was homosexual. He and his wife Norine Lillian Cecil separated in 1956, but remained friends; she later adopted a lesbian lifestyle. Higham lived with his partner Richard V. Palafox, a nurse, until Palafox's death in 2010, in Los Angeles. His personality was described as "unpleasant"; he habitually insulted restaurant waiters, and would often sit at tables for the better part of an hour before looking at a menu. He died on 21 April 2012, in Los Angeles.

Higham received a Prix des Créateurs from Eugène Ionesco in 1978 for his biography of Marlene Dietrich, and a poetry prize.

== Books ==
- They Came to Australia (ed. with Alan Brissenden) (1961)
- Australians Abroad (ed. with Michael Wilding) (1967)
- The Films of Orson Welles (1970)
- Hollywood in the Forties (co-written with Joel Greenberg) (1970)
- Ziegfeld (1972)
- Cecil B. DeMille: A Biography of the Most Successful Film Maker of Them All (1973)
- The Art of the American film, 1900-1971 (1973)
- Kate: The Life of Katharine Hepburn (1976)
- Charles Laughton: An Intimate Biography (1976)
- The Adventures of Conan Doyle: The Life of the Creator of Sherlock Holmes (1976)
- Marlene: The Life of Marlene Dietrich (1977)
- Celebrity Circus (1979)
- Errol Flynn: The Untold Story (1980)
- Bette, the Life of Bette Davis (1981)
- Princess Merle: The Romantic Life of Merle Oberon (1983) with Roy Moseley, ISBN 0-698-11231-8
- Trading with the Enemy: The Nazi American Money Plot 1933-1949 (1983), ISBN 0-440-09064-4
- Sisters: The Story of Olivia De Havilland and Joan Fontaine (1984)
- American Swastika: Americas involvement with the Nazis in WWII New York: Doubleday & Company, Inc. Garden City, 1985.
- Audrey: a Biography of Audrey Hepburn (1985)
- Orson Welles: The Rise and Fall of An American Genius (1985)
- Brando: The Unauthorized Biography (1987)
- Cary Grant: The Lonely Heart (1989)
- The Duchess of Windsor: The Secret Life (1988), (2005)
- Elizabeth and Philip: The Untold Story of the Queen of England and Her Prince (1991)
- Merchant of Dreams: Louis B. Mayer, M.G.M., and the Secret Hollywood (1993)
- Howard Hughes: The Secret Life (1993)
- Rose: The Life and Times of Rose Fitzgerald Kennedy (1995)
- Murder in Hollywood: Solving a Silent Screen Mystery (2004)
- In and Out of Hollywood: A Biographer’s Memoir (2009)
