= George House (British politician) =

British politician (1892–1949)

Member of Parliament for St Pancras North
- In office 5 July 1945 – 8 February 1949
- Preceded by: Robert Grant-Ferris
- Succeeded by: Kenneth Robinson

Personal details
- Born: 7 March 1892
- Died: 8 February 1949 (aged 56)
- Party: Labour

George House (7 March 1892 – 8 February 1949) was a British Labour Party politician.

He originally worked as a printer, later becoming a steel erector. He was secretary of the Constructional Engineering Union from 1924 - 1939.

He was twice a member of the London County Council: representing Islington South from 1928 to 1931 and St Pancras North from 1937 to 1949.

He was elected at the 1945 general election as Member of Parliament (MP) for St Pancras North, but died in office less than four years later, aged 56.

Parliament of the United Kingdom
Preceded by Robert Grant-Ferris	Member of Parliament for St Pancras North; 1945–1949	Succeeded by Kenneth Robinson
Trade union offices
Preceded by New position	Secretary of the Constructional Engineering Union; 1924 – 1939	Succeeded by Jack Stanley
