= William Cluse =

William Sampson Cluse (20 December 1875 – 8 September 1955) was a British Labour Party politician.

Born in Islington, he was orphaned at the age of five, by the time he was eleven Cluse was working part-time. At the age of fifteen he was apprenticed to the printing trade. In 1900 he entered politics, joining the Social Democratic Federation.

During the First World War he served in the Royal Army Medical Corps. Following the war he entered local government when he was elected to Islington Borough Council as a Labour Party councillor representing Tollington ward in 1919. At the 1922 municipal elections he was elected to the council again, this time as a representative of St Peter's Ward.

At the 1923 general election he was elected Member of Parliament for Islington South. Re-elected twice, he lost his seat at the 1931 general election. He regained the seat in 1935, retiring from parliament at the 1950 general election. He held a minor post in the war-time coalition government as Parliamentary Private Secretary to the Minister of Transport and then to the Minister of Aircraft Production.

On 17 December 1942, Anthony Eden, the foreign secretary, gave the first formal news of the Holocaust to the House of Commons. Cluse, an infrequent speaker, suggested that members "rise in their places" to observe a minute of silent protest. They did.

He married Alice Louise Warner in 1902 and the couple had two children.

Parliament of the United Kingdom
Preceded by Charles Garland	Member of Parliament for Islington South; 1923–1931	Succeeded by Tom Howard
Preceded by Tom Howard	Member of Parliament for Islington South; 1935–1950	Succeeded by Constituency abolished
Media offices
Preceded by Walton Newbold	Editor of the Social Democrat; 1931–1933	Succeeded by Publication closed
