= Charles Higham (publicist) =

British publicist and politician

Sir Charles Frederick Higham
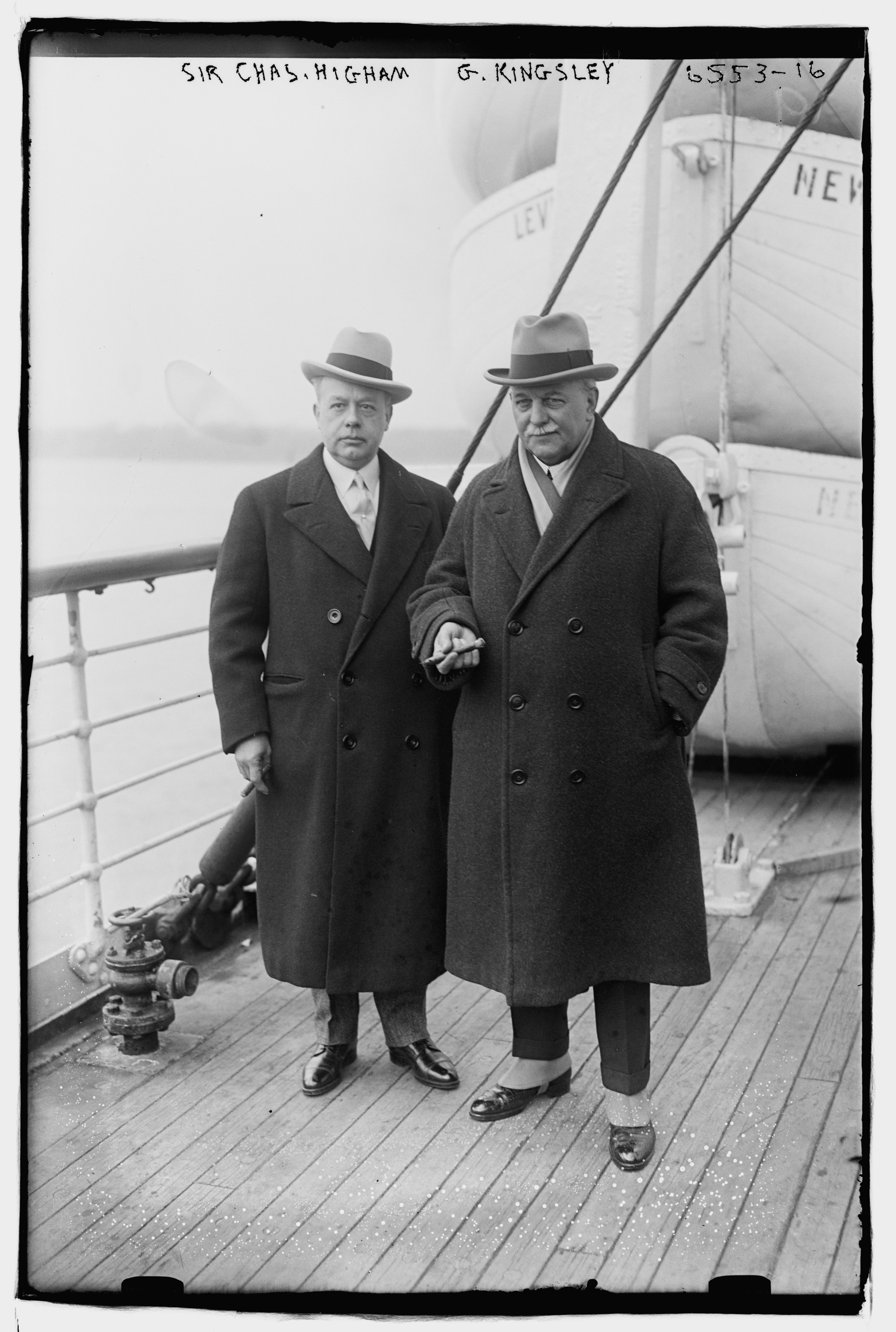
- Sir Charles Higham (on left), c. 1920

Member of Parliament for Islington South
- In office 1918–1922
- Preceded by: Thomas Wiles
- Succeeded by: Charles Samuel Garland

Personal details
- Born: 17 January 1876 Walthamstow, London, England
- Died: 24 December 1938 (aged 62) Godstone, Surrey, England
- Political party: Conservative
- Occupation: Publicist, advertising consultant

Sir Charles Frederick Higham (/ˈhaɪəm/; 17 January 1876 – 24 December 1938) was a British publicist, advertising consultant prominent in World War I and a Conservative Party politician elected as the Member of Parliament for Islington South in the County of London for one term, from 1918 to 1922.

== Background, upbringing and emigration ==
Born in Walthamstow, he was the eldest son of Charles and Emily Higham. His father, a solicitor's clerk, died when he was nine years old. Along with his mother and two brothers he emigrated to the United States shortly after his father's death. Leaving home aged 13, he had a series of varied jobs including chemist's assistant, newspaper reporter and assistant hotel manager.

== Advertising in Britain ==
In 1906 he returned to England, eventually establishing his own advertising agency, Charles F. Higham Limited.

During the First World War the importance in waging a successful war against Germany and Austria-Hungary of advertising for army recruitment was realised by the government and Higham was appointed a member of the Committee on Recruiting Propaganda. He was later appointed Director of Publicity for the National War Savings Committee. He was knighted in 1921 for his wartime creativity and services.

== Term in the House of Commons for Islington South ==
At the 1918 general election that followed the war, Higham was elected Coalition Conservative MP for Islington South. He chose to only serve a single term, standing down at the 1922 general election. In 1924–25 he visited America to popularise tea-drinking, also publicising the British Empire Exhibition. He was also made a Freeman of the City of London, and in 1930 was presented with the Publicity Cup by the Lord Mayor.

== Publications and personal life ==
He was the author of a number of books on advertising including Scientific Distribution (1918), Looking Forward: Mass Education Through Publicity (1920), Advertising and the Man-in-the-street (1929) and Advertising: Its Use and Abuse (1931).

Higham married five times. He died at his home in South Godstone, Surrey, on Christmas Eve, 1938, of pneumonia and cancer of the mouth. A son, also Charles Higham, from his fourth marriage (to Josephine Janet Keuchenius Webb), became a biographer and writer and his daughter, Anna Higham went on to become a teacher.

== Arms ==
Coat of arms of Charles Higham
Notes Granted 2 April 1924. Crest In front of a horse’s head in armour proper a portcullis chained Or. Escutcheon Sable an inescutcheon Argent on a chief indented Or a lion passant guardant of the field. Motto I Am Master Of My Fate

Parliament of the United Kingdom
Preceded by Thomas Wiles	Member of Parliament for Islington South; 1918–1922	Succeeded by Charles Samuel Garland
