= Islington South West =

Parliamentary constituency in the United Kingdom, 1950–1974

- Former borough constituency for the House of Commons
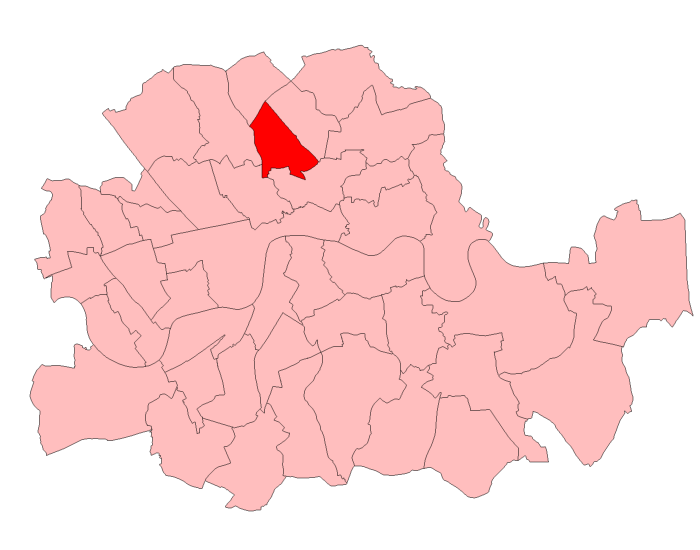
- Islington South West boundaries from 1950–74

- Islington Metropolitan Borough in 1916

1950–February 1974
- Seats: one
- Created from: Islington South and Islington West
- Replaced by: Islington Central and Islington South and Finsbury

Islington South West was a parliamentary constituency in the Metropolitan Borough of Islington, in North London.

It returned one Member of Parliament (MP) to the House of Commons of the Parliament of the United Kingdom from 1950 until it was abolished for the February 1974 general election.

== Boundaries ==
The Metropolitan Borough of Islington wards of Barnsbury, Lower Holloway, St Mary, St Peter, and Thornhill.

In 1966, 12.9% of the constituency was born in the New Commonwealth.

== Members of Parliament ==
Election	Member	Party
1950	Albert Evans	Labour
1970	George Cunningham	Labour
Feb 1974	constituency abolished: see Islington South & Finsbury	

== Election results ==
=== Elections in the 1950s ===
General election 1950: Islington South West
Party	Candidate	Votes	%	±%
Labour	Albert Evans	30,201	64.74	
Conservative	Tom Howard	13,012	27.89	
Liberal	George William Waddilove	2,602	5.58	
Communist	Alfred Bender	834	1.79	
Majority		17,189	36.85	
Turnout		46,649	74.60	
Labour win (new seat)				

General election 1951: Islington South West
Party	Candidate	Votes	%	±%
Labour	Albert Evans	31,637	68.20	
Conservative	Tom Howard	14,750	31.80	
Majority		16,887	36.40	
Turnout		46,387	75.17	
Labour hold		Swing		

General election 1955: Islington South West
Party	Candidate	Votes	%	±%
Labour	Albert Evans	24,935	68.12	
Conservative	Colin GS Hodgkinson	11,667	31.88	
Majority		13,268	36.24	
Turnout		36,602	62.04	
Labour hold		Swing		

General election 1959: Islington South West
Party	Candidate	Votes	%	±%
Labour	Albert Evans	22,362	65.13	
Conservative	Nicholas Scott	11,974	34.87	
Majority		10,388	30.26	
Turnout		34,336	60.64	
Labour hold		Swing		

=== Elections in the 1960s ===
General election 1964: Islington South West
Party	Candidate	Votes	%	±%
Labour	Albert Evans	17,589	65.17	+0.04
Conservative	Nicholas Scott	8,023	29.73	−5.14
Communist	John F Moss	1,377	5.10	New
Majority		9,566	35.44	+5.18
Turnout		26,989	51.53	−9.11
Registered electors		52,373		
Labour hold		Swing	+2.59	

General election 1966: Islington South West
Party	Candidate	Votes	%	±%
Labour	Albert Evans	16,206	64.95	−0.22
Conservative	Alan Hardy	5,903	23.66	−6.07
Independent	Harry Weston	1,271	5.09	New
Union Movement	Dennis Herbert Harmston	816	3.27	New
Communist	John F Moss	756	3.03	−2.07
Majority		10,303	41.29	+5.85
Turnout		24,952	50.93	−0.60
Registered electors		48,995		
Labour hold		Swing	+2.93	

=== Election in the 1970s ===
General election 1970: Islington South West
Party	Candidate	Votes	%	±%
Labour	George Cunningham	12,876	60.89	
Conservative	John Szemerey	6,601	31.21	
New Liberal	Alan Ernest Lomas	1,161	5.49	New
Communist	Marie Betteridge	509	2.41	
Majority		6,275	29.68	
Turnout		21,147	48.84	
Labour hold		Swing		

== See also ==
- List of parliamentary constituencies in London
