= Edwin Malindine =

British politician

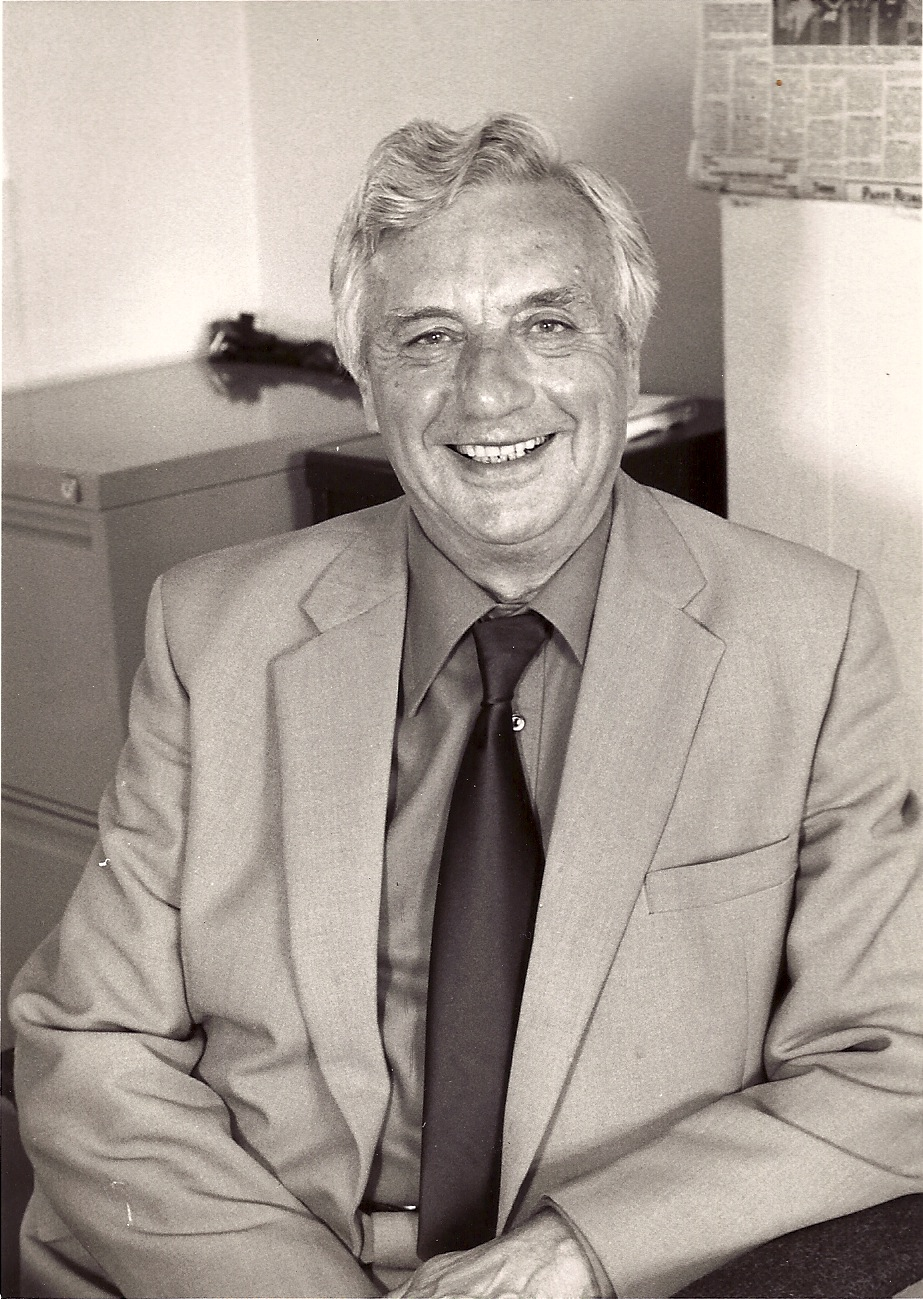
Edwin Malindine

Edwin Thomas Malindine (1 January 1910 – 5 September 1993) was a Liberal Party politician.

Malindine worked in the lubrication industry, and was elected to Bethnal Green Borough Council for the Liberal Party, initially becoming the youngest councillor in England. He stood for the party in East Leyton at the 1935 general election, but lost his deposit. During World War II, he served in the Royal Army Service Corps. He stood for Parliament unsuccessfully at Wood Green in 1945, Wellingborough in 1950, Southgate in 1951, by which time he was vice-Chairman of the London Liberal Party.

He continued to try for election, only narrowly missing out in North Cornwall in 1955 and 1959. He served as President of the Liberal Party from 1961–1962, but thereafter concentrated on his business concerns, becoming Chairman and Managing Director of Sternol Ltd in 1971.

Party political offices
Preceded by Andrew Hunter Arbuthnot Murray	President of the Liberal Party; 1961–1962	Succeeded by Felix Brunner
