= Tom Howard (British politician) =

British politician

Tom Forrest Howard DCM (23 December 1888 – 12 June 1953) was a British politician.

== Early life ==
Howard left school at the age of fourteen to become a bookbinder. He established his own stationery business at the age of nineteen. He became involved in Conservative politics before the First World War, and was a supporter of the Tariff Reform League. During the war he fought on the Western Front, and was awarded the Distinguished Conduct Medal for conspicuous gallantry at the Battle of Cambrai. He ended the war with the rank of sergeant major.

== Local elections ==
In 1922 he fought his first election, winning a seat on Finsbury Borough Council, serving until 1925. In 1925 he was elected to the London County Council as one of two councillors representing Islington South. He was a member of the Municipal Reform Party, the Conservative-backed group that held a majority on the county council. He lost his county council seat at the next election in 1928, but regained it in 1931, before being unseated again in 1934.

== Parliamentary elections ==
Howard first contested an election to the House of Commons in 1924 as Conservative candidate for Islington South. He failed to be elected, and contested the seat in 1929, again without success.

On his third attempt he was elected MP for Islington South at the 1931 general election, benefiting from a collapse in the Labour vote. At the next election in 1935 the Labour Party regained the seat.

Howard continued to contest elections up to his death: at Islington South in 1945, at a 1947 by-election at Islington West in 1947, and at Islington South West in 1950 and 1951.

He was President of the Islington South West Conservative Association at the time of his death, aged 64, in a London hospital in 1953.

Parliament of the United Kingdom
Preceded by William Cluse	MP for Islington South; 1931–1935	Succeeded by William Cluse
