= Islington South (UK Parliament constituency) =

Parliamentary constituency in the United Kingdom, 1885–1950

- Former borough constituency for the House of Commons

1885–1950
- Seats: one
- Created from: Finsbury
- Replaced by: Islington South West

Islington South was a parliamentary constituency in the Metropolitan Borough of Islington in North London. It returned one Member of Parliament (MP) to the House of Commons of the Parliament of the United Kingdom.

The constituency was created for the 1885 general election, and abolished for the 1950 general election.

== Boundaries ==
=== 1885–1918 ===
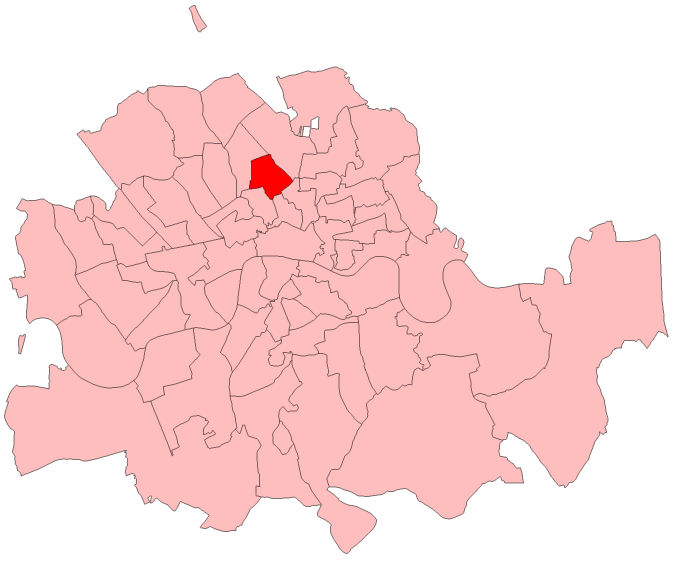
Islington South in London 1885–1918

The constituency was defined as comprising 3 wards of the parish of Islington: Barnsbury, St Mary and St Peter. These wards were used for the election of vestryman under the Metropolis Management Act 1855.

=== 1918–1950 ===
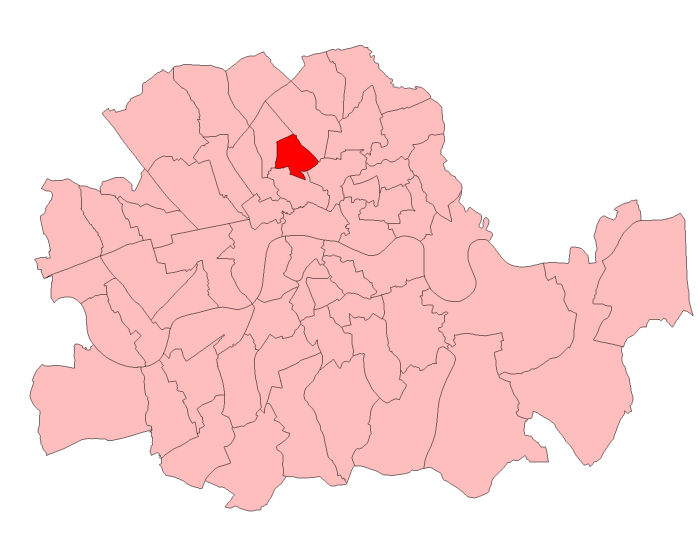
Islington South in London 1918–50

Under the Representation of the People Act 1918 constituencies in the County of London were redefined in terms of the Metropolitan Boroughs created in 1900. The constituency was defined as comprising three wards of the Metropolitan Borough of Islington having the same names as the previous wards: Barnsbury, St Mary and St Peter.

== Members of Parliament ==
Election	Member	Party
1885	Henry Spicer	Liberal
1886	Sir Albert Rollit	Conservative
1906	Thomas Wiles	Liberal
1918	Charles Higham	Unionist
1922	Charles Garland	Unionist
1923	William Cluse	Labour
1931	Tom Howard	Conservative
1935	William Cluse	Labour
1950	constituency abolished	

== Elections ==
=== Elections in the 1880s ===
General election 1885: Islington South
Party	Candidate	Votes	%	±%
Liberal	Henry Spicer	3,050	54.9	
Conservative	Henry Wildey Wright	2,502	45.1	
Majority		548	9.8	
Turnout		5,552	79.0	
Registered electors		7,024		
Liberal win (new seat)				

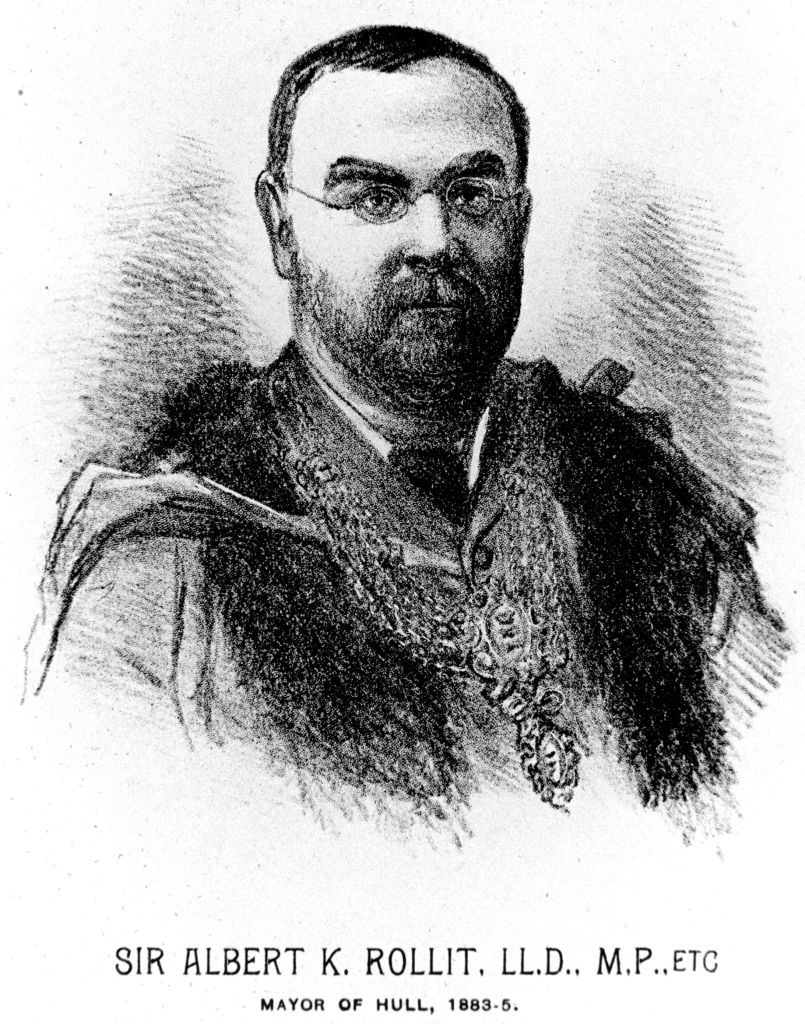
Sir Albert Rollit

General election 1886: Islington South
Party	Candidate	Votes	%	±%
Conservative	Albert Rollit	2,774	55.7	+10.6
Liberal	Henry Spicer	2,208	44.3	−10.6
Majority		566	11.4	N/A
Turnout		4,982	70.9	−8.1
Registered electors		7,024		
Conservative gain from Liberal		Swing	+10.6	

=== Elections in the 1890s ===
General election 1892: Islington South
Party	Candidate	Votes	%	±%
Conservative	Albert Rollit	3,194	52.6	−3.1
Liberal	William Digby	2,873	47.4	+3.1
Majority		321	5.2	−6.2
Turnout		6,067	73.1	+2.2
Registered electors		8,299		
Conservative hold		Swing	−3.1	

General election 1895: Islington South
Party	Candidate	Votes	%	±%
Conservative	Albert Rollit	3,563	60.3	+7.7
Liberal	Heber Hart	2,342	39.7	−7.7
Majority		1,221	20.6	+15.4
Turnout		5,905	71.6	−1.5
Registered electors		8,244		
Conservative hold		Swing	+7.7	

=== Elections in the 1900s ===
General election 1900: Islington South
Party	Candidate	Votes	%	±%
Conservative	Albert Rollit	3,881	70.0	+9.7
Liberal	James Andrew Strahan	1,665	30.0	−9.7
Majority		2,216	40.0	+19.4
Turnout		5,546	63.1	−8.5
Registered electors		8,796		
Conservative hold		Swing	+9.7	

Thomas Wiles

General election 1906: Islington South
Party	Candidate	Votes	%	±%
Liberal	Thomas Wiles	3,606	55.7	+25.7
Conservative	Albert Rollit	1,991	30.8	−39.2
Ind. Conservative	W. Hunt (Note: Supported by the Tariff Reform League)	870	13.5	New
Majority		1,615	24.9	N/A
Turnout		6,467	77.3	+14.2
Registered electors		8,361		
Liberal gain from Conservative		Swing	+32.5	

=== Elections in the 1910s ===
General election January 1910: Islington South
Party	Candidate	Votes	%	±%
Liberal	Thomas Wiles	3,917	55.1	−0.6
Conservative	David Faber	3,187	44.9	+14.1
Majority		730	10.2	−14.7
Turnout		7,104	85.9	+8.6
Liberal hold		Swing		

General election December 1910: Islington South
Party	Candidate	Votes	%	±%
Liberal	Thomas Wiles	3,494	55.5	+0.4
Conservative	Lionel Wormser Harris	2,803	44.5	−0.4
Majority		691	11.0	+0.8
Turnout		6,297	76.2	−9.7
Liberal hold		Swing		

General Election 1914–15:

Another General Election was required to take place before the end of 1915. The political parties had been making preparations for an election to take place and by July 1914, the following candidates had been selected;

- Liberal: Thomas Wiles
- Unionist:

General election 1918: Islington South
Party		Candidate	Votes	%	±%
C	Unionist	Charles Higham	6,885	53.9	+9.4
	Liberal	Thomas Wiles	5,883	46.1	−9.4
Majority			1,002	7.8	N/A
Turnout			12,768	44.1	−32.1
Registered electors			28,976		
	Unionist gain from Liberal		Swing	+9.4	
C indicates candidate endorsed by the coalition government.

=== Elections in the 1920s ===
General election 1922: Islington South
Party	Candidate	Votes	%	±%
Unionist	Charles Garland	7,877	36.1	−17.8
Liberal	Thomas Wiles	7,352	33.6	−12.5
Labour	Frederick Pethick-Lawrence	6,634	30.3	New
Majority		525	2.5	−5.3
Turnout		21,863	64.2	+20.1
Registered electors		34,029		
Unionist hold		Swing	−2.7	

General election 1923: Islington South
Party	Candidate	Votes	%	±%
Labour	William Cluse	7,764	37.0	+6.7
Liberal	Edward Brotherton-Ratcliffe	7,531	35.9	+2.3
Unionist	Charles Garland	5,691	27.1	−9.0
Majority		233	1.1	N/A
Turnout		20,986	60.9	−3.3
Registered electors		34,462		
Labour gain from Unionist		Swing	+2.2	

General election 1924: Islington South
Party	Candidate	Votes	%	±%
Labour	William Cluse	10,347	42.8	+5.8
Unionist	Tom Howard	8,668	35.9	+8.8
Liberal	Edward Brotherton-Ratcliffe	5,158	21.3	−14.6
Majority		1,679	6.9	+5.8
Turnout		24,173	69.4	+8.5
Registered electors		34,818		
Labour hold		Swing	−1.5	

General election 1929: Islington South
Party	Candidate	Votes	%	±%
Labour	William Cluse	13,737	46.6	+3.8
Unionist	Tom Howard	9,418	32.0	−3.9
Liberal	Frank Milton	6,316	21.4	+0.1
Majority		4,319	14.6	+7.7
Turnout		29,471	66.2	−3.2
Registered electors		44,490		
Labour hold		Swing	+3.9	

=== Elections in the 1930s ===
General election 1931: Islington South
Party	Candidate	Votes	%	±%
Conservative	Tom Howard	18,071	62.4	+29.4
Labour	William Cluse	10,910	37.6	−9.0
Majority		7,161	24.8	N/A
Turnout		28,981	64.8	−1.4
Conservative gain from Labour		Swing		

General election 1935: Islington South
Party	Candidate	Votes	%	±%
Labour	William Cluse	12,526	52.4	+14.8
Conservative	Tom Howard	11,398	47.6	−14.8
Majority		1,128	4.8	N/A
Turnout		23,924	56.7	−8.1
Labour gain from Conservative		Swing		

General Election 1939–40

Another General Election was required to take place before the end of 1940. The political parties had been making preparations for an election to take place and by the Autumn of 1939, the following candidates had been selected;

- Labour: William Cluse
- Conservative: Tom Howard

=== Elections in the 1940s ===
General election 1945: Islington South
Party	Candidate	Votes	%	±%
Labour	William Cluse	12,893	72.5	+20.1
Conservative	Tom Howard	4,877	27.5	−20.1
Majority		8,016	45.0	+40.2
Turnout		17,770	64.0	+3.3
Labour hold		Swing		

== See also ==
- Islington constituencies

== Notes and references ==
Notes

References

- Leigh Rayment's Historical List of MPs – Constituencies beginning with "I"
- British Parliamentary Election Results 1885–1918, compiled and edited by F.W.S. Craig (Macmillan Press 1974)
- Debrett's Illustrated Heraldic and Biographical House of Commons and the Judicial Bench 1886
- Debrett's House of Commons and the Judicial Bench 1901
- Debrett's House of Commons and the Judicial Bench 1918
