= Geojedo =

Island in Geoje, South Korea

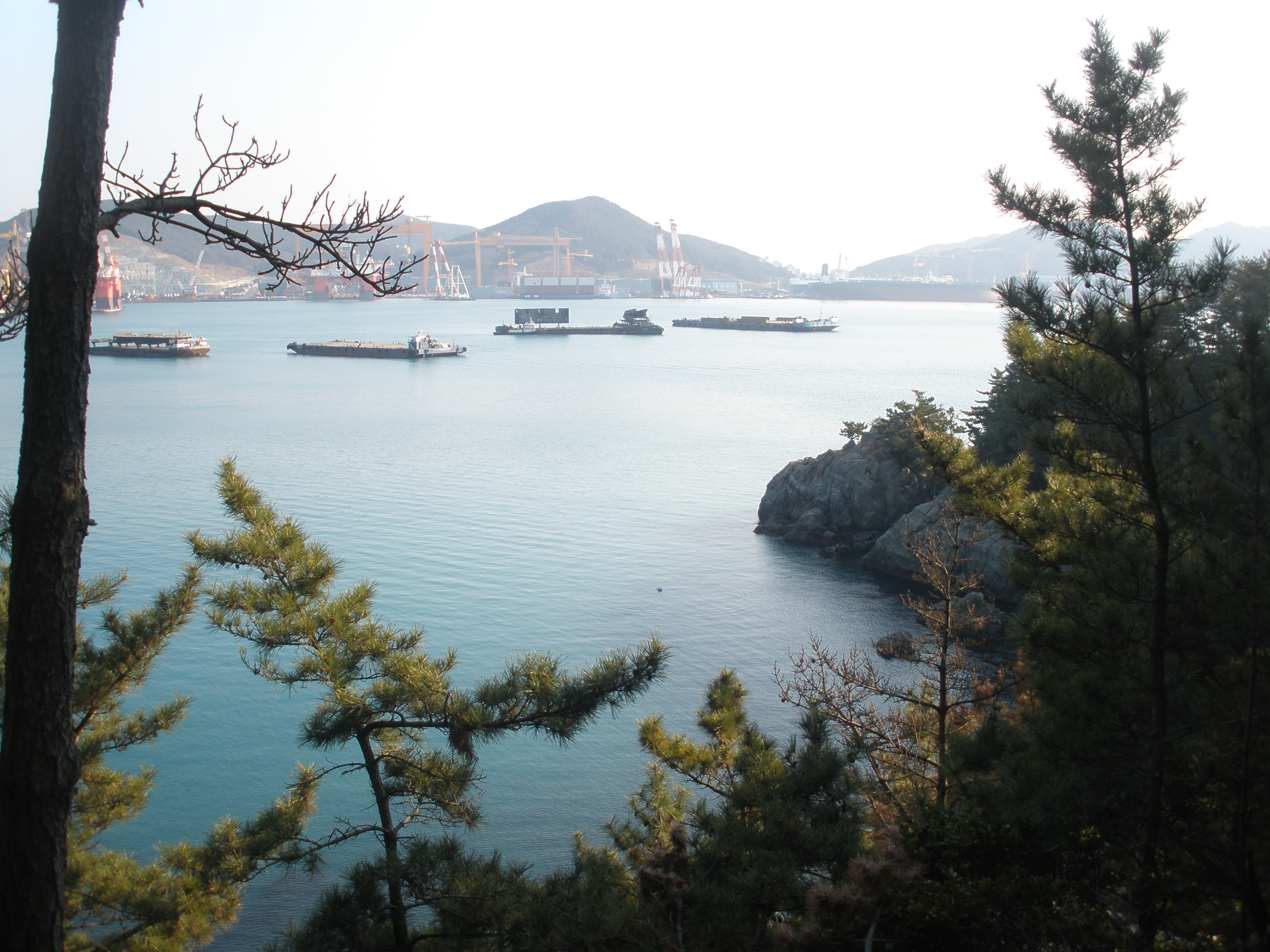
- Off the coast of the island, with shipyards and ships in view (2011)
- Interactive map of Geojedo

Geography
- Location: Korea Strait
- Coordinates: 34°51′29″N 128°37′06″E
- Area: 383.44 km^{2} (148.05 sq mi)
- Highest elevation: 580 m (1900 ft)
- Highest point: Gara

Administration
- Republic of Korea
- Province: Gyeongsangnam-do
- Largest settlement: Geoje (pop. 242,077)
- Democratic People's Republic of Korea (claimed)
- Province: South Kyōsang Province

Demographics
- Ethnic groups: Korean

Korean name
- Hangul: 거제도
- Hanja: 巨濟島
- RR: Geojedo
- MR: Kŏjedo

Geojedo (Korean: 거제도), or Geoje Island, is the principal island of Geoje, South Gyeongsang Province, South Korea. It is accessible from the mainland via two bridges at nearby Tongyeong. Gohyeon is the largest town on the island.

After Jeju Island, Geojedo is the second-largest island in South Korea; it has an area of 383.44 square kilometres (148.05 sq mi). The island has several peaks: Gara (580 metres, 1,900 ft), Daegeum (437.5 metres, 1,435 ft) and Guksabong (400 metres, 1,300 ft). Geojedo is known for its rich deposits of granite. The island's southern belt, together with part of Namhaedo in Namhae County, comprises Hallyeo Maritime National Park.

Geojedo has several natural harbors. Shipbuilding is the largest industry on the island. It is home to Daewoo Shipbuilding and Marine Engineering (DSME) in the city of Okpo, and Samsung Heavy Industries (SHI) in the city of Gohyeon (Geoje City), the second- and third-largest shipyards in South Korea.

The island is linked to the mainland city of Busan by the Busan–Geoje Bridge, which was opened in December 2010.

The population of Geojedo is 232,807, as of October 2024.

== Etymology ==
The name comes from Korean Geoje 'Great Crossing Island'; from 巨 'great, large', 濟 'crossing, ferry' and 島 'island'.

== History ==
During the Three Kingdoms period, Geojedo was one of twelve states of Byeonhan (변한), then called Dokno (독로국; 瀆盧國). In 757 A.D., during the Silla period (신라시대), King Gyeongdeok began to use the name Geoje County (거제군) to refer to the island.

In the Korea and Joseon dynasty period, after the area called Giseong (기성현) was split off from Geoje 거제현 in 1914, the Geoje area was mistakenly called Tongyeong (통영군). During this period, the island was a strategic location between Japan and the Korean Peninsula, and was invaded by the Empire of Japan.

When the Japanese invaded Tongyeong in 1592, the Navy Headquarters of Three Provinces was established in Geoje, which served as a command for naval battles in the area. Among these were the Battle of Okpo in May 1592, the Battle of Geojedo (옥포해전) on July 28 of the same year, and the Gyeonnaeryang (견내량해전), which is also known as the Hansan Great Victory (한산대첩). In 1597, the first and only naval defeat of the Japanese in Korean history took place at Chilcheon, Geoje (칠천량해전).

During the Korean War in 1951, UN Forces established the Geoje POW Camp to accommodate captured North Koreans. 31 prisoners died during conflicts there. Koje Unscreened (1953), a booklet written by journalists Alan Winnington and Wilfred Burchett, focused on the poor conditions in the camp.

In 1953, Geoje became an independent county, and in the early 1970s, the shipbuilding industry began producing ships, which led to population growth. In 1995, Geoje had a large enough population to be classified as a city (시). It is now the hub of the shipbuilding industry, a major component of Korea's economic development.

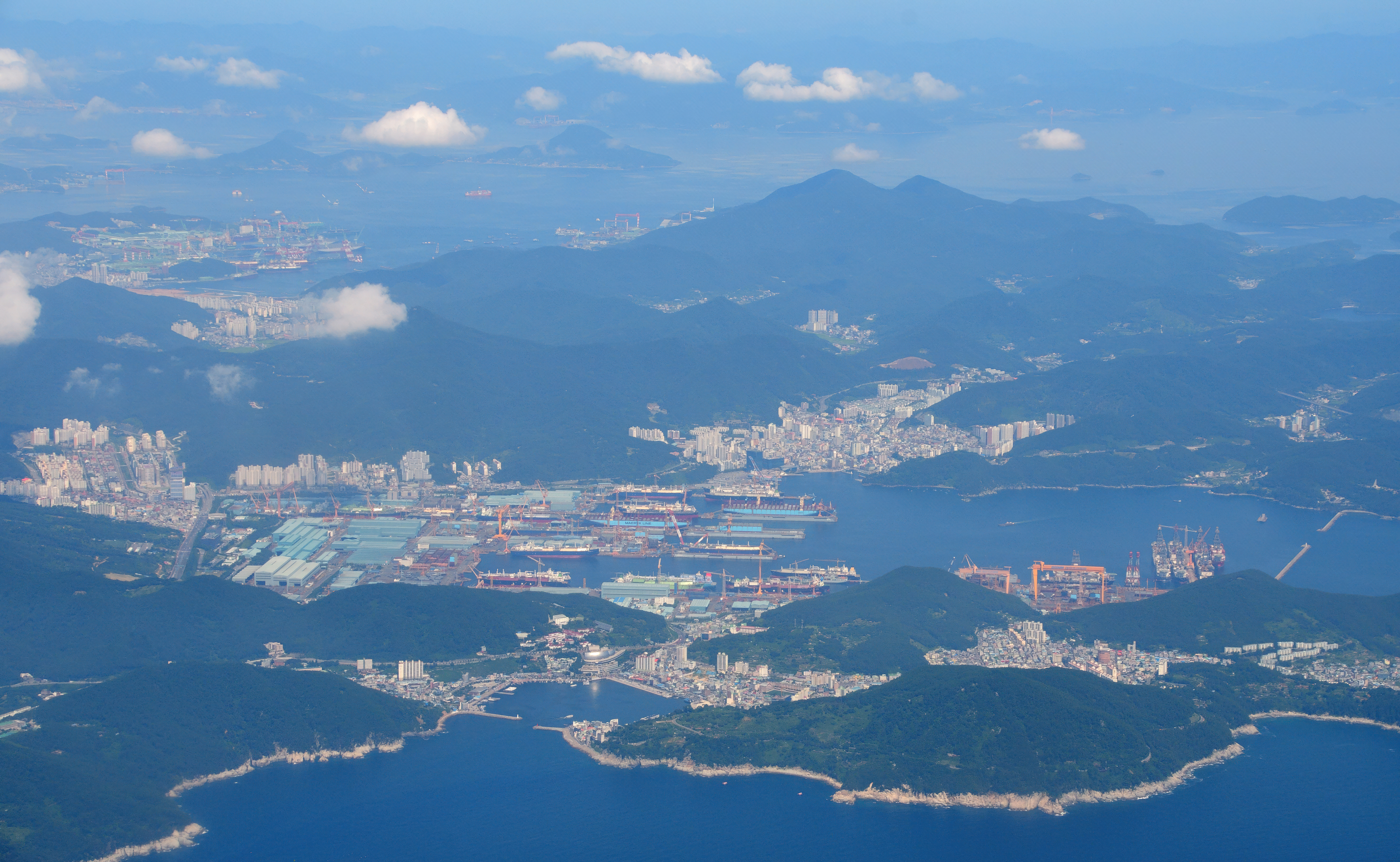
Aerial view of Daewoo Shipbuilding & Marine Engineering's facilities on Geoje (2017)

Geoje is home to two Presidents of South Korea: Kim Young-sam (1993–1998) and Moon Jae-in (2017-2022).

In December 1950, Geojedo was the final port of call of SS Meredith Victory after it was used to evacuate about 14,000 North Korean civilians from Hungnam.

== See also ==
- Islands of South Korea
- Geography of South Korea
