= Bill Wainwright =

British communist activist

- Born: William Wainwright; November 24, 1908
- Died: October 27, 2000 (aged 91)
- Political party: The Communist Party of Great Britain

William Wainwright (24 November 1908 – 27 October 2000) was a British communist who served as the assistant general secretary of the Communist Party of Great Britain from 1956 until 1959. An active journalist, he was the deputy editor of the Morning Star, and he was an antifascist during World War II.

== Early life and education ==
Bill Wainwright was born on 24 November 1908. He grew up in the East End of London, and studied chemistry at the Chelsea Polytechnic. Later, he became an associate of the Institute of Chemistry of Great Britain.

== Career ==
=== The Communist Party of Great Britain ===
In 1931, Wainwright joined the Communist Party of Great Britain through the Fulham branch. Succeeding Sam Aaronovitch, he became the leader of the National Cultural Committee in 1955, and, in 1956, he became the party's assistant general secretary after John Gollan replaced Harry Pollitt as the general secretary, opening the post. From 1959 until 1975, he was a member of the party's Executive Committee. He also served as the national organiser of the Young Communist League, and, after World War II, he was the general secretary of the British Soviet Friendship Society.

As a communist, he criticised the actions of the Trades Union Congress and the Labour Party during the General Strike of 1926. Nikita Khrushchev's secret speech in 1956 led Wainwright to regret the CPGB's defense of the Soviet leadership, and he disagreed with the Soviet invasion of Hungary during the Hungarian Revolution of 1956.

=== Journalism ===
Wainwright was editor of the Young Communist League newspaper Challenge. He was also the editor of the Daily Worker and the deputy editor of the Morning Star.

After standing down as the deputy editor of the Morning Star, Wainwright worked part-time as the newspaper's science editor. He was fired from this role in June 1984 during a dispute between the CPGB and the People's Press Printing Society. Protests led to his reinstatement several months later.

=== Activities during World War II ===
During World War II, Wainwright was a member of the Home Guard. He also served as the secretary of the British Peace Committee, the British arm of the World Peace Council; he continued this work after the war ended.

Wainwright organised anti-fascist opposition from within his flat in World's End, Chelsea. When he heckled Oswald Mosley at the 1934 meeting of the British Union of Fascists in west London, he was removed from the premises and beaten up.

== Death ==
Wainwright died on 27 October 2000; he was 91 years old. He was predeceased by his wife Molly, who died in 1991.

Party political offices
Preceded by George Matthews	Assistant General Secretary of the Communist Party of Great Britain; 1956–1959	Succeeded by Bill Alexander
