= I saw the truth in Korea =

1950 exposé about the massacre of civilians during the Korean War

- Author: Alan Winnington
- Language: English
- Subject: Korean War
- Publisher: People's Press Printing Society
- Publication date: 1950
- Publication place: United Kingdom

I saw the truth in Korea: Facts and photographs that will shock Britain! (1950) was a British journalistic leaflet written by Alan Winnington, one of the only two native speaking English journalists to cover the Korean War from the northern side. The leaflet contains photographic and eyewitness evidence of mass graves near Daejeon containing the corpses of thousands of civilians executed by South Korean forces during the Korean War. It was published in 1950 by People's Press Printing Society which also published for the Daily Worker for which Winnington was working as a journalist.

The leaflet claims that an approximate 7,000 corpses of executed civilians had been hastily buried in a mountain valley close to Daejeon. During the Korean War the United States military accused the leaflet of being an "atrocity fabrication", however United States military archives declassified in 1999 have since released new photographs showing the massacre of civilians as it happened.

The publishing of this leaflet, along with Winnington's favourable coverage of the North Korean forces during the Korean War, led to Winnington's reputation being attacked by the British government who then made him stateless by refusing to renew his passport.

Currently, the leaflet and its contents are being used as a guide by historians and activists in South Korea to uncover the locations of mass graves in Daejeon, and has played a role in the creation of a Peace Park in the area set to be completed 2024 which will commemorate the victims of the war crimes exposed by the leaflet.
