= Tony Chater =

British newspaper editor (1929–2016)

Anthony Philip John "Tony" Chater (21 December 1929 – 2 August 2016) was a British newspaper editor, political candidate, and Communist activist.

== Early life ==
Born in Northampton, Chater attended Northampton Town and County Grammar School, and joined the Communist Party of Great Britain (CPGB) whilst in the sixth form. He then studied at Queen Mary, University of London, gaining a first (BSc, 1951) and a PhD in chemistry in 1954. While studying for his PhD, he met his future wife Janice who was reading chemistry and maths.

After a two-year post-doctoral research fellowship at Dominion Experimental Farm in Canada, and another year at Brussels University studying biochemistry, Chater returned to Britain to teach. He initially worked at Northampton Technical High School, later Blyth Grammar School, Norwich, and from 1960 at the Luton College of Technology where he remained until 1969.

Chater stood in the 1963 Luton by-election as the CPGB's parliamentary candidate but finished last, gaining only 593 votes. Despite this, he stood again in Luton in 1964, 1966 and 1970, each time without success.

== Morning Star ==
After serving as Chair of the CPGB in 1968–69, Chater began working full-time for the party as its head of press and publicity. In 1974 he swapped jobs with George Matthews to become editor of the Morning Star, a daily newspaper associated with the party. He attempted to get the party executive to prioritise increasing sales, but with limited results. In 1982 the paper, run by the People's Press Printing Society (PPPS), was coming into open conflict with the CPGB over whether to back the shop stewards movement. The following year, the revisionist party leadership attempted to remove Chater's supporters from the executive of the PPPS, but the reverse occurred: Chater's opponents were defeated. Chater, however, was expelled from the CPGB in January 1985. An opposition coalesced around him and Mick Costello, but they were defeated at the 1987 Party Congress and subsequently founded the Communist Party of Britain.

Chater stepped down as editor of the Morning Star in 1995. He was an avid reader in his last years until his health declined due to vascular dementia. He died on 2 August 2016. He was survived by his wife Janice and three sons.

Media offices
Preceded by George Matthews	Editor of The Morning Star; 1974–1995	Succeeded by John Haylett
