= Hermes 3000 =

Make of typewriter

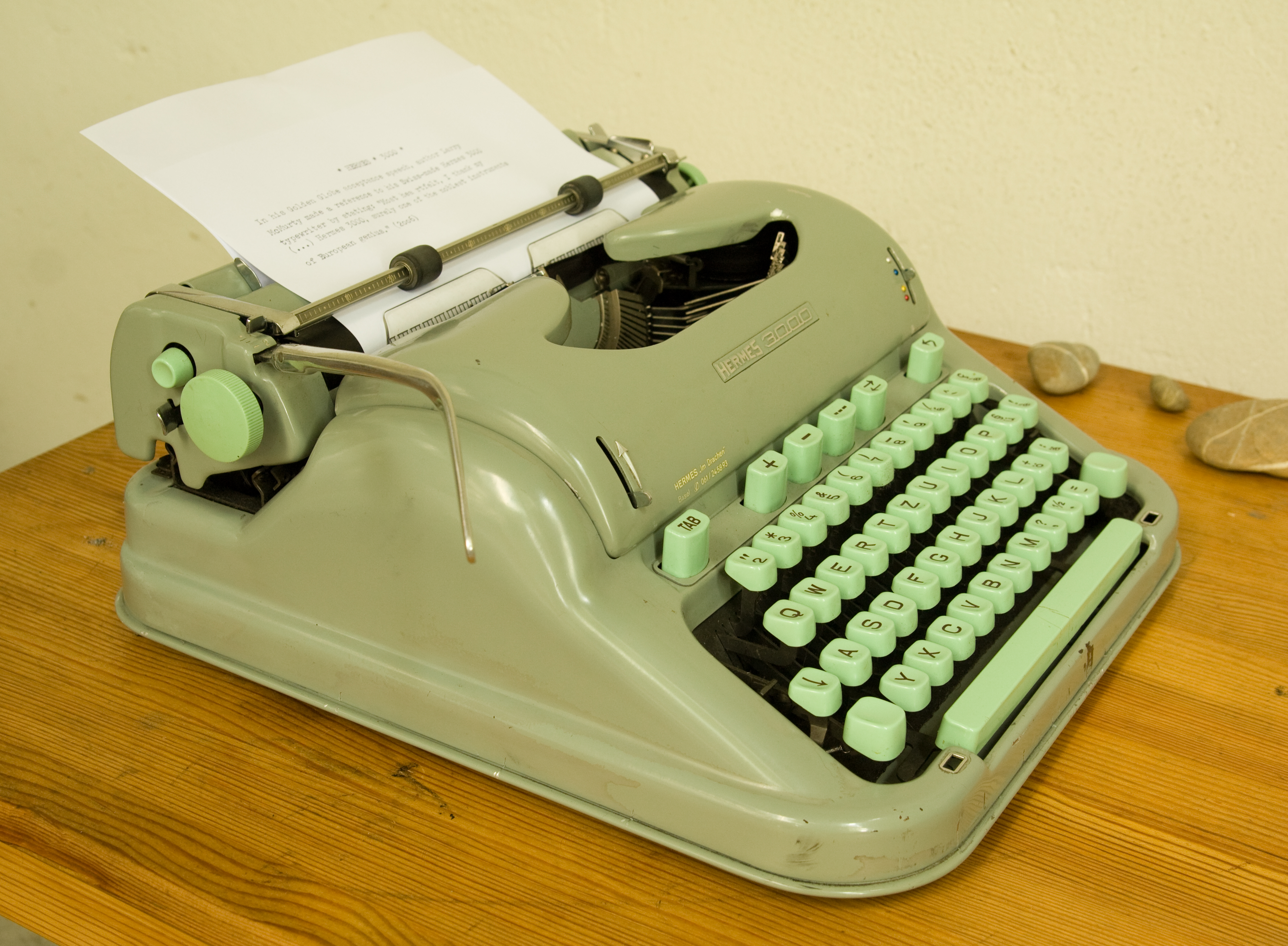
Hermes 3000 typewriter

The Hermes 3000 is a lightweight, segment-shifted portable typewriter manufactured by Paillard-Bolex. "Bulbous" and "angular" in shape,it came with a fitted, hard-shell removable cover. The machines were built in Yverdon, Switzerland, by Paillard S.A.

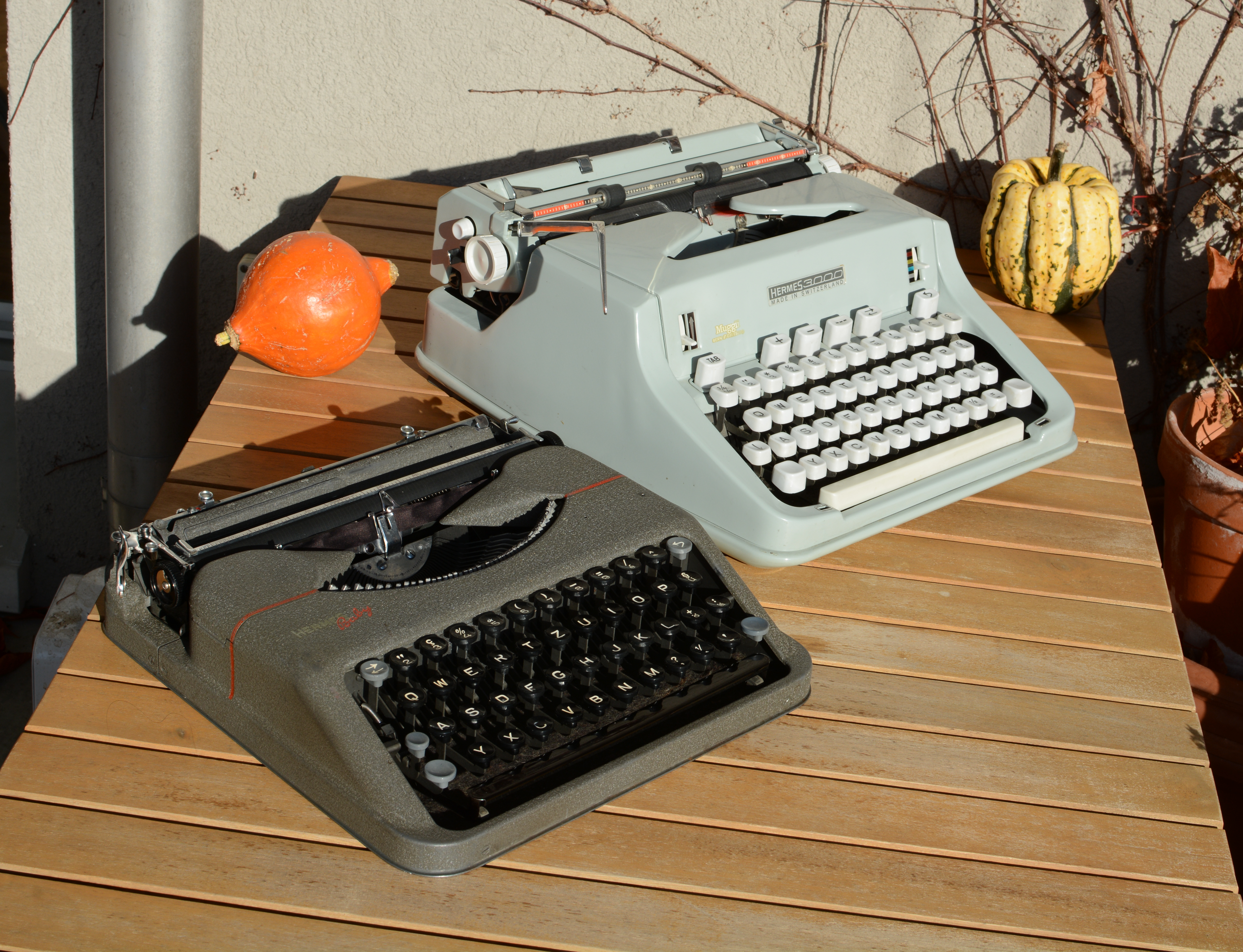
Hermes 3000 from 1970 (back), in front of it is a Hermes Baby

The Hermes 3000 was introduced in 1958 as a successor to the Hermes 2000. The original Model 1 was produced until 1966; with subsequent design modifications to the external casing and a variety of subtle changes in colour finishes, the Hermes 3000 was manufactured into the 1980s. Although it was a portable machine, the Hermes 3000 had a few deluxe features, such as a "beyond the margins" key, which could also be depressed to free any jammed keys and return them to their resting position. The typewriters predominantly came in a light green (occasionally described as a mint or "sea-foam green") colour.

== In popular culture ==
William Kotzwinkle's 1972 novel was named Hermes 3000 after the machine. During his acceptance speech for Best Screenplay (Brokeback Mountain) at the 2006 Golden Globes, author Larry McMurtry specifically mentioned his Hermes 3000, stating: "Most heartfelt, I thank my typewriter. My typewriter is a Hermes 3000, surely one of the noblest instruments of European genius. It has kept me for thirty years out of the dry embrace of the computer".

Other notable users of the machine are Sam Shepard, Eugène Ionesco and Stephen Fry. Beat writer Jack Kerouac wrote his final novel, Vanity of Duluoz, on the Hermes 3000 in 1966. In a March 2018 auction at Bonhams in London, the Hermes 3000 on which Sylvia Plath had typed her only novel — The Bell Jar — in 1962 was sold for £26,000 ($46,071). (Note: Described in The Financial Times as "a mint-green Hermes 3000 typewriter, lightly smudged, bought in Boston in 1959", The Guardian later noted that the Bonhams' sale placed the value of Plath's Hermes "comfortably above Jack Kerouac’s, also a green Hermes, which pulled in $22,500 (£16,000), and John Updike’s $4,375 (£3,110)".) In 2013, in an appearance on BBC Radio 4's Desert Island Discs, actor Tom Hanks named the Hermes 3000 as the luxury item he would choose to take with him. (Note: Hanks has been described as a "connoisseur" of typewriters, possessing 250 of the machines. In a 2013 opinion piece for The New York Times, Hanks described the Hermes range as the "Cadillac of typewriters".)
