= Ben Chacko =

English journalist

- Born: 1984 (age 41–42); Camden, London, England
- Education: Pate's Grammar School; St John's College, Oxford
- Occupation: Journalist
- Years active: 2010–present
- Known for: Editor of the Morning Star

Ben Patrick Chacko (born 1984) is an English journalist who is the editor of the Morning Star. After joining the newspaper in 2010, he became editor in 2015.

== Early life ==
Chacko was born in Camden, London. He was brought up in Cheltenham, and educated at the local Pate's Grammar School, and St John's College, Oxford, where he studied Mandarin Chinese.

His father, Francis Chacko, who came to Britain from India at the age of eight, is an actuary, (Note: Francis Xavier Chacko, M.A., qualified as a Fellow of the Institute of Actuaries in 1992. In 1993, he was working for Eagle Star Life Assurance Co. Ltd. in Cheltenham, according to the List of Members 1993–1994, published by the Institute of Actuaries, 1993.) while his Lancastrian mother Sarah (née Willcock) is a software engineer who studied for a DPhil at the University of Oxford. His brother is the tax barrister, Thomas Chacko, of Pump Court Tax Chambers.

Chacko credits his conversion to communism to a recommendation from his mother when he was a teenager that he abandon the Socialist Worker newspaper, published by the Socialist Workers Party, for something more genuinely "leftie", such as the Morning Star. Chacko found the Star "a real revelation".

By the age of 15, Chacko was attending meetings of the Young Communist League. He edited Challenge, the journal of the Young Communist League and was a member of the student union council at Oxford.

== Career ==
Chacko was appointed editor of the Morning Star in May 2015, the youngest editor of the paper since its founding editor, William Rust. He joined the paper as a sub-editor in 2010, and was subsequently deputy features editor, assistant editor and deputy editor before being appointed acting editor in July 2014. "The Star is the most precious and only voice we have in the daily media", said the Labour MP Jeremy Corbyn at the time of Chacko's appointment in May 2015. "I look forward to working with Ben in promoting socialism and progress".

== Political views ==
After leaving university, Chacko lived in China for a few years. The country, according to him, is evidence that "you can run a society without surrendering to the idea that the market is always right". Post-Soviet Russia, on the other hand, he describes as "a gangster capitalist state run by oligarchs".

In summer 2015, he told Josh Glancy of The Sunday Times: "We need a revolution in politics to overturn the power of private ownership... That doesn't mean you'd have people storming Buckingham Palace. It could be a revolution that is enacted by people in parliament as a result of a mass movement for change".
