= Koje Unscreened =

1953 journalistic booklet

- Authors: Wilfred Burchett and Alan Winnington
- Language: English
- Subjects: Korean War, human rights, prisoners of war
- Genre: Journalism
- Publisher: Britain-China Friendship Association
- Publication date: 1953
- Pages: 111

Koje Unscreened is a journalistic booklet published in 1953 and jointly written by Wilfred Burchett and Alan Winnington, the only two native English speaking journalists to cover the Korean War from the northern side of the conflict.

The book covers the infamous prisoner of war camp on Geojedo which was run by the United States military during the Korean War, and focuses primarily on both a riot in the camp on 10 June 1952 and the poor treatment of prisoners. Both authors compare the American treatment of POWs to Nazi concentrations camps such as Belsen. The book's content is largely based on interviews with escaped former inmates supplemented with Red cross reports and literature published in 1952, and accuses the Americans and their allies of torture, rape, murder, forced conscription of enemy troops, and forced tattooing of prisoners.

== Comments by historians ==
Koje Unscreened has been used as a primary source for studying the Korean War by numerous historians. Historian Charles Steuart Young, described Koje Unscreened as containing "substantial insider information that had trickled out of the camps" and that the book "adds detail to events documented in other sources."

== Editions ==
Multiple editions were published, including a self-published version in China, and a version published in Britain by the Britain-China Friendship Association.
