= George Matthews (journalist) =

British communist activist and newspaper editor

- Born: 24 January 1917
- Died: 29 March 2005 (aged 88)
- Education: Bedford Modern School
- Alma mater: University of Reading
- Known for: Newspaper Columnist, Editor and Communist
- Political party: Labour (1936–1940); CPGB (1938–1991); Democratic Left (from 1991)

George Matthews (24 January 1917 – 29 March 2005) was a British communist activist and newspaper editor.

== Life ==
Born to a wealthy family in Bedfordshire, Matthews was educated at Bedford Modern School, studied agriculture at the University of Reading and joined the Labour Party. In 1938, he secretly joined the Communist Party of Great Britain (CPGB), while retaining his Labour Party membership. From 1939 to 1940, he served as vice president of the National Union of Students, and was also the Labour Party's prospective parliamentary candidate for Mid Bedfordshire.

In 1940, Matthews left the Labour Party, and during the war he was active in the National Union of Agricultural and Allied Workers. In 1943, he was appointed to the CPGB's Executive Committee, and in 1949, he became the party's Assistant General Secretary. He attended the 20th Congress of the Communist Party of the Soviet Union in 1956, and was acting editor of the party's Daily Worker newspaper during the Soviet invasion of Hungary. In 1947, he became the paper's assistant editor, moving to become editor in 1949. In 1966, he gained agreement to rename the paper as the Morning Star.

Matthews stood down as editor in 1974, swapped jobs with Tony Chater and took charge of the CPGB's press and publicity. After five years in the post, he retired, but continued to supervise the party's archives, and strongly backed party leader Gordon McLennan, working on many of his speeches. When the party dissolved in 1991, he joined Democratic Left.

Party political offices
Preceded by John Gollan	Assistant General Secretary of the Communist Party of Great Britain; 1949–1956	Succeeded by Bill Wainwright
Media offices
Preceded by John Ross Campbell	Editor of the Daily Worker, then the Morning Star; 1959–1974	Succeeded by Tony Chater
