= John Haylett =

British journalist and editor (1945–2019)

John Haylett (8 June 1945 – 28 September 2019) was a British journalist and editor of the Morning Star (1995–2009). He oversaw a recovery in the Star following a crisis of both readership following the collapse of the Soviet Union, and politically after a faction fight broke out within the linked Communist Party of Britain (CPB).

Prior to joining the Morning Star as a reporter in 1983 Haylett worked as an operator in international telecoms and was a grassroots representative for the Union of Post Office Workers (subsequently UCW, now part of the CWU). He had already joined the Communist Party of Great Britain (CPGB) at a time when tensions were rising between its left and right factions and when he was hired, according to former colleague Roger Bagley,

“he ruffled the feathers of the right-wing mob … I was warned: ‘Watch out, they’re putting this hard man in’.”

Haylett subsequently worked on several desks at the paper, eventually rising to assistant editor in 1985. Three years later, the Star was thrown into crisis as its effective parent organisation, the CPGB, collapsed and was replaced by the newly-formed CPB. This was followed shortly after by the loss of thousands of bulk sales as support from the USSR was ended in 1989. As the crisis unfolded, Haylett was promoted to deputy editor the same year.

The Star's readership declined to around 7,000 as it entered the early 1990s, and as the CPB struggled to re-organise rising tensions emerged between different factions of the newly-formed group over control of the paper. This revolved in particular around the question of who would succeed soon-to-be retired editor Tony Chater. Chief Executive Mary Rosser favoured news editor Paul Corry (her son-in-law) while staff and the trade unions favoured Haylett.

Haylett's support base initially won out, and his appointment to the role was announced in the paper's 27 February 1995 issue, starting on 1 April of that year.

The following three years saw relations between the different factions break down further however, and in 1998 many of the Star's workers — then earning £10,500 a year and with no raise for 11 years — went on strike following the unexpected sacking of Haylett by Rosser. During the protest a breakaway from the Star titled the Workers' Morning Star was temporarily published by a small group of journalists who worked for the Morning Star at the same time.

Haylett was eventually reinstated as editor and the protests stopped as circulation saw a moderate increase. Explaining the paper's political position following the strike, Haylett said in 2005: "Our political relationship is still with the Communist Party of Britain." He pointed out that only about 10% of readers were members of the party, "but now we represent a broad movement".

Haylett stepped down as editor at the end of 2008 with his final column in the role appearing on 31 December, after which he moved to become the paper's political editor. He continued to work for the Star until March 2019, when he retired due to ill-health.

Media offices
Preceded by Tony Chater	Editor of The Morning Star; 1995–2008	Succeeded by Bill Benfield
