= Morning Star (British newspaper) =

Left-wing British daily newspaper

- Front page of the Morning Star from 27 June 2020
- Type: Daily newspaper
- Format: Tabloid
- Owner: People's Press Printing Society
- Editor: Ben Chacko
- Founded: 1 January 1930; 96 years ago (as Daily Worker); 25 April 1966; 60 years ago (as Morning Star)
- Political alignment: Communism (historically); Socialism; Trade unionism; Britain's Road to Socialism
- Headquarters: William Rust House, Bow, London
- Circulation: 10,000 (as of 2008)
- ISSN: 0307-1758
- Website: morningstaronline.co.uk

The Morning Star is a left-wing British daily newspaper with a focus on social, political and trade union issues. Originally founded in 1930 as the Daily Worker by the Communist Party of Great Britain (CPGB), ownership was transferred from the CPGB to an independent readers' co-operative, the People's Press Printing Society, in 1945 and later renamed the Morning Star in 1966. The paper describes its editorial stance as in line with Britain's Road to Socialism, the programme of the Communist Party of Britain. It has been called "Britain's last communist newspaper."

The Daily Worker initially opposed the Second World War and its London edition was banned in Britain between 1941 and 1942. After the Soviet Union joined the Allies, the paper enthusiastically backed the war effort. During the Cold War, the paper provided a platform for critics of the US and its allies. This included whistleblowers who provided evidence that the British military were allowing their forces to collect severed heads during the Malayan Emergency, and exposing the mass graves of civilians killed by the South Korean government.

The paper prints contributions by writers from a variety of left-wing political perspectives. Contributors include Jeremy Corbyn, Virginia Woolf, Angela Davis, Billy Strachan, Len Johnson, Wilfred Burchett, Claudia Jones, Jean Ross, and Harry Pollitt. Correspondent Alan Winnington had his British passport revoked in 1954 for his reporting on massacres in the Korean War, and favourable representation of North Korean prisoner-of-war camps. Some non-political topics covered by the paper have included arts reviews, sports, gardening, book reviews, and cooking.

== The Daily Worker (1930–1966) ==
=== Early years ===
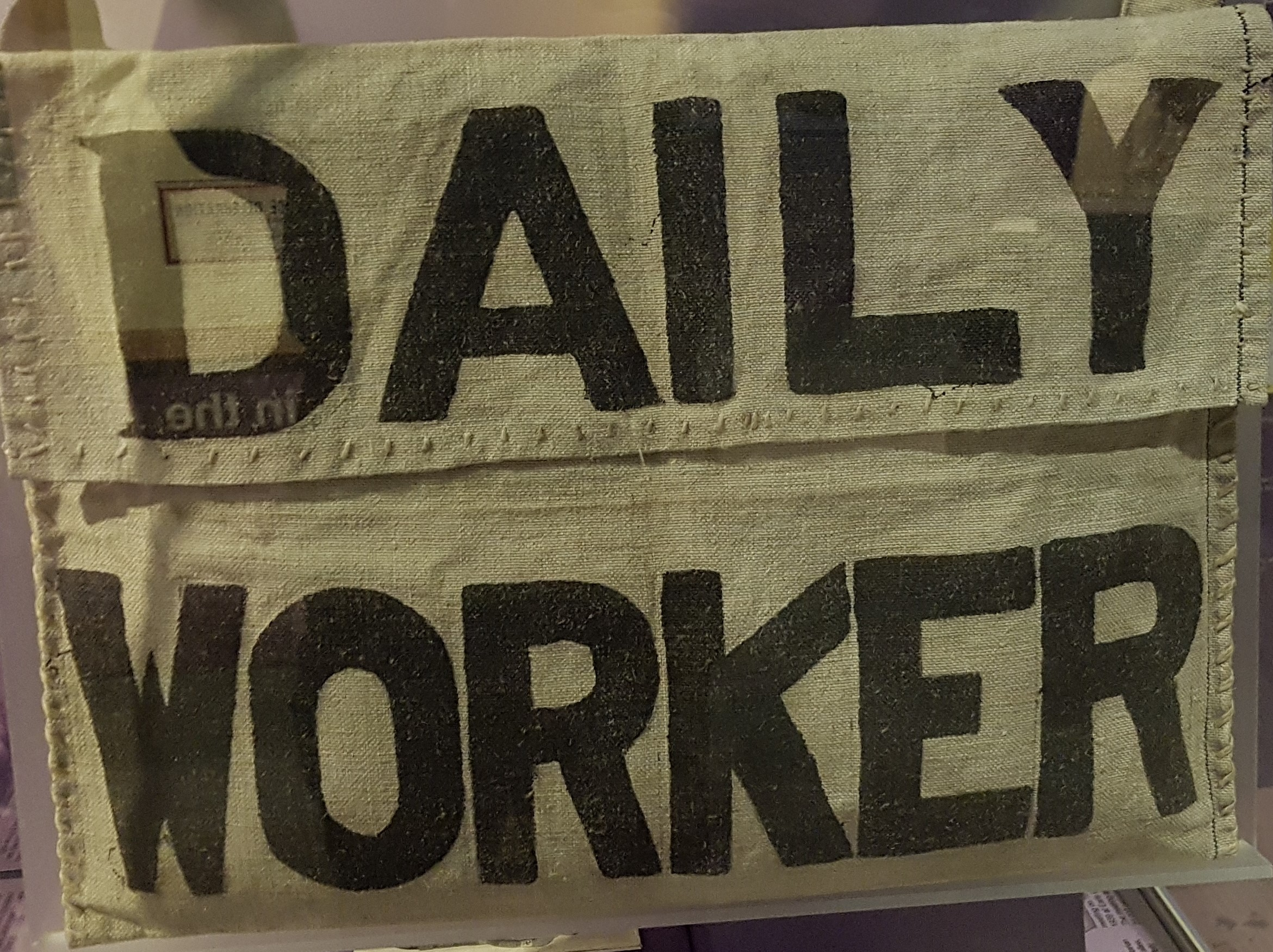
Daily Worker delivery bag

The Morning Star was founded in 1930 as the Daily Worker, the paper representing the Central Committee of the Communist Party of Great Britain (CPGB), and was immediately preceded by and grew out of the Weekly Worker (10 Feb 1923 – 21 January 1927) and Workers Life (28 Jan 1927 – 20 December 1929) newspapers. The first edition was produced on 1 January 1930 from the offices of the newspaper in Tabernacle Street, London, after a meeting the day before by nine British communists, including Willie Gallacher, Kay Beauchamp, Tom Wintringham, Walter Holmes, and Robert Page Arnot.

In the first few decades of its existence, the Daily Worker contained cartoons for children. The Daily Worker's first issue contained a children's cartoon titled "Micky Mongrel the Class Conscious Cur", drawn by artist Gladys Keable, which would become a staple of the early paper. The paper's first editor was journalist William Rust, while the paper's assistant editor and manager was Tom Wintringham, and was printed at Wintringham's Unity Press. In January 1934, the Daily Worker's offices moved to Cayton Street, off City Road. The first eight-page Daily Worker was produced on 1 October 1935.

=== Second World War ===
On 3 September 1939, Prime Minister Neville Chamberlain spoke to the nation on the BBC, at which time he announced the formal declaration of war between Britain and Nazi Germany. Daily Worker editor J. R. Campbell, backed by his political ally, Party General Secretary Harry Pollitt, sought to portray the conflict against Hitler as a continuation of the anti-fascist fight. This contradicted the position of the Comintern in the aftermath of the Molotov–Ribbentrop Pact (which became CPGB policy on 3 October) that the war was a struggle between rival imperialist powers, and Campbell was removed as editor as a result, being replaced by William Rust.

The paper accused the British government's policies of being "not to rescue Europe from fascism, but to impose British imperialist peace on Germany" before attacking the Soviet Union. The newspaper responded to the assassination of Leon Trotsky by a Soviet agent with an article on 23 August 1940, entitled "A Counter Revolutionary Gangster Passes", written by former editor Campbell.

The paper criticised Sir Walter Citrine after his meeting in Paris with French Labour Minister Charles Pomaret in December 1939. Time said of the events following the meeting, "Minister Pomaret clamped down on French labour with a set of drastic wage-&-hour decrees and Sir Walter Citrine agreed to a proposal by Chancellor of the Exchequer Sir John Simon that pay rises in Britain be stopped". Citrine sued the Daily Worker for libel after it accused him and his associates of "plotting with the French Citrines to bring millions of Anglo-French Trade Unionists behind the Anglo-French imperialist war machine"; the publisher pleaded the British press equivalent of "fair comment". Citrine alleged, in response to his lawyer's questioning, that the Daily Worker received £2,000 per month from "Moscow", and that Moscow directed the paper to print anti-war stories.

During this period, when the Soviet Union had a non-aggression pact with Germany, the Daily Worker ceased to attack Nazi Germany. On 21 January 1941, publication of the newspaper was suppressed by the Home Secretary in the wartime coalition, Herbert Morrison (a Labour Party MP). It had repeatedly ignored a July 1940 warning that its pacifist line contravened Defence Regulation 2D, which made it an offence to 'systematically to publish matter calculated to foment opposition to the prosecution of the war'. A Scottish edition of the Daily Worker was produced from its plant in Glasgow from 11 November 1940. On 16 April 1941, the Daily Worker offices at Cayton Street were totally destroyed by fire during the Blitz. The paper moved temporarily in 1942 to the former Caledonian Press offices in Swinton Street (whence the old Communist Party Sunday Worker, edited by William Paul and Tom Wintringham, had been published from 15 March 1925 until 1929). New offices were acquired in 1945, at a former brush-makers' warehouse at 75 Farringdon Road, for the sum of £48,000.

When Germany invaded the Soviet Union in Operation Barbarossa in June 1941, the situation changed; British Communists became fervent supporters of the war. For the rest of the war, the paper was a strong supporter of the British war effort, and campaigned to organise a "Second Front" in Europe to assist the Soviet Union. The government's ban on the Daily Worker was lifted in September 1942, following a campaign supported by Hewlett Johnson, the Dean of Canterbury, and Professor J. B. S. Haldane. A "Lift the ban" conference at Central Hall, Westminster on 21 March 1942 was attended by over 2,000 delegates. A key part of the campaign was to secure Labour Party support (Herbert Morrison was a fierce opponent of the Daily Worker). On 26 May 1942, after a heated debate, the Labour Party carried a resolution declaring the government must lift the ban on the Daily Worker.

The Daily Worker welcomed the dropping of the atomic bomb on Hiroshima, editorialising "The employment of the new weapon on a substantial scale should expedite the surrender of Japan". The paper also applauded the bombing of Nagasaki, and called for the use of additional atomic bombs against the Japanese.

The People's Press Printing Society was formed just after the war in 1945. The society's purpose was to raise money for the paper under a co-operative ownership model, and it quickly attracted support from the labour movement. By January 1946 it had 10,000 individual members, as well as organisational membership from 186 trade union bodies and 17 other co-operatives. One month later, in February 1946, a large rally was organised at the Royal Albert Hall, the Daily Worker which was then owned by Keable Press Ltd on behalf of the Communist Party of Great Britain, was sold to the People's Press Printing Society for a single shilling.

=== Postwar ===
The Daily Worker reached its peak circulation after the war, although precise circulation figures are disputed – from 100,000 to 122,000 (Note: Tomlinson J. Left Right, London: John Calder, 1981.) to 140,000 and even 500,000.

The Daily Worker's campaigns against the colour bar in Britain inspired British middleweight champion boxer Len Johnson to join the Communist Party of Great Britain, and write a boxing column for the Daily Worker.

The Daily Worker was fully supportive of the show trials in Hungary, Czechoslovakia and Bulgaria in the late 1940s, as well as the split with Tito and Yugoslavia in 1948.

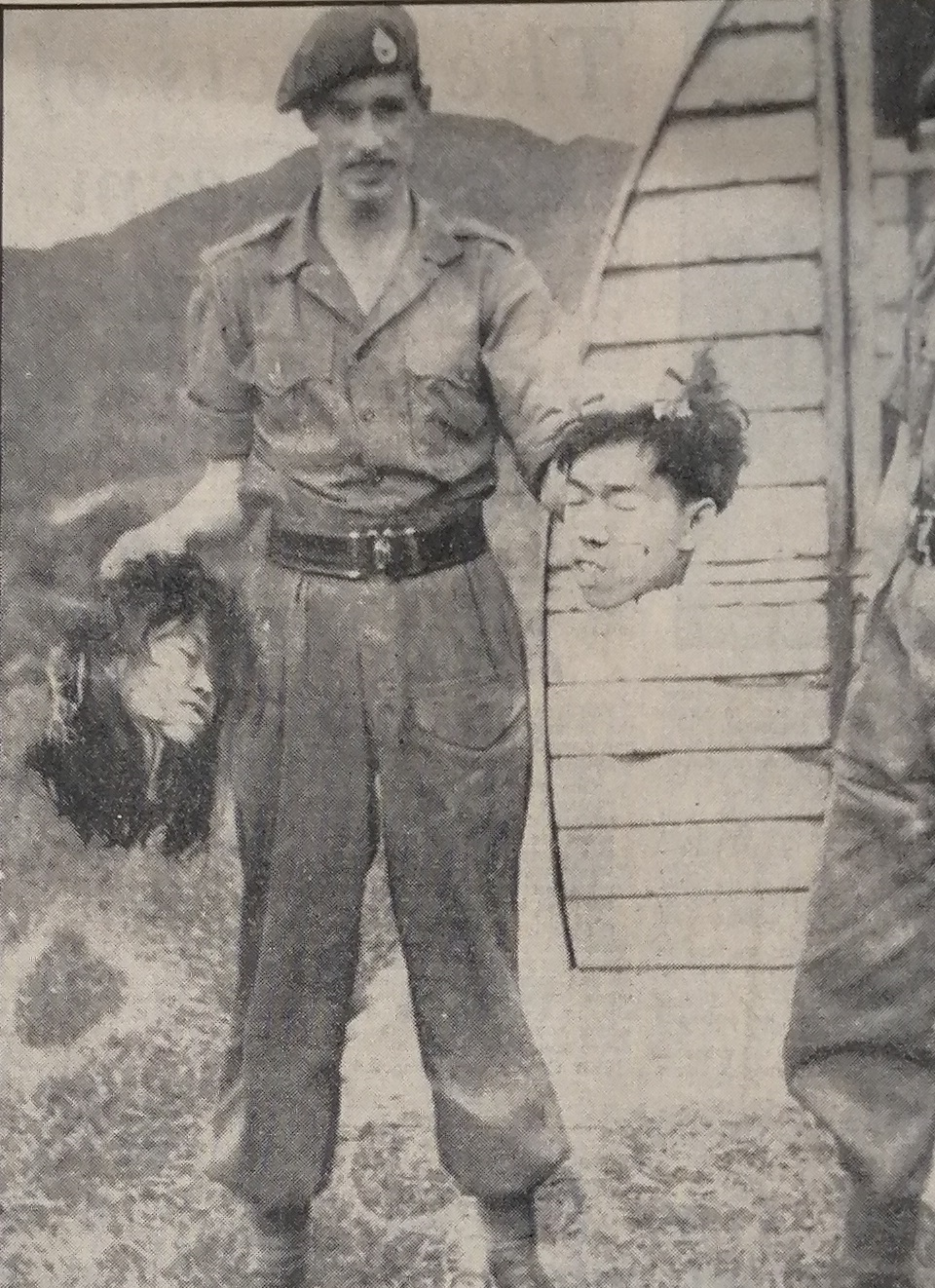
Photographic proof of British war crimes during the Malayan Emergency published by the Daily Worker, 10 May 1952

In 1950 Daily Worker foreign correspondent Alan Winnington published the pamphlet, I Saw the Truth in Korea, which provided evidence of mass graves containing thousands of corpses belonging to civilians executed by the South Korean government during the Korean War. The paper published alleged evidence of America's use of biological weapons during the Korean War. In response to Winnington's Korea reporting, Clement Attlee's cabinet discussed having Winnington executed by charging him with treason. However, it was instead decided to make him stateless by refusing to renew his passport. Phillip Knightley described Winnington as one of the most trustworthy voices of the war.

In April 1952, the Daily Worker published photographs of a Royal Marine commando in the middle of a British military base posing with the severed human head believed to have belonged to a member of the Malayan National Liberation Army (MNLA). The article also included eyewitness testimonies from British personnel in Malaya alleging that it was common for British troops to behead people. An Admiralty spokesman accused the photographs of being forgeries and a "communist trick", though Colonial Secretary Oliver Lyttelton later confirmed to Parliament that the images were genuine. Lyttleton noted the decapitations were conducted by Iban headhunters by the British. The Daily Worker then published several more photographs of MNLA guerrillas decapitated by Ibans, including photographs of an Iban wearing a Royal Marine beret while preparing a scalp above a basket of human limbs.

In 1956, the Daily Worker suppressed correspondent Peter Fryer's reports from the Hungarian revolution, which were favourable to the uprising. The paper denounced the attempted revolution as a "white terror", invoking the Horthy regime and earlier 1919–1921 period.

By the late 1950s the paper was down to just one sheet of four pages. The last edition of the Daily Worker was published on Saturday 23 April 1966. An editorial in that final issue declared:

"On Monday this newspaper takes its greatest step forward for many years. It will be larger, it will be better and it will have a new name.... During its 36 years of life our paper has stood for all that is best in British working-class and Socialist journalism. It has established a reputation for honesty, courage and integrity. It has defended trade unionists, tenants, pensioners. It has consistently stood for peace. It has always shown the need for Socialism. Let all Britain see the Morning Star, the inheritor of a great tradition and the herald of a greater future".

In February every year between 1950 and 1954, the Daily Worker held a rally at Harringay Arena in Harringay, north London, attended by about 10,000 people. Guests were entertained by tableaux set to music, including a performance by Paul Robeson in 1950 with a related recording on Topic Records. (Note: A copy of the label of the 1950 release can be seen on Harringay Online.)

== Morning Star (1966–present) ==
=== History ===
The first edition of the Morning Star appeared on Monday, 25 April 1966. South African exile Sarah Carneson worked for the newspaper in the late 1960s.

Until 1974, the paper was subsidised by the Soviet government with direct cash contributions, and from 1974 onwards was indirectly supported by daily bulk orders from Moscow. Its chief executive from 1975 was Mary Rosser.

By the late 1970s, the paper and the CPGB were beginning to come into conflict with one another, as the Eurocommunist trend in the CPGB grew, while the Morning Star at the time retained a pro-Soviet stance and opposed Eurocommunism. An editorial in The Guardian, however, reported in 1977 that the paper was giving coverage to dissidents in Czechoslovakia and elsewhere in the Soviet bloc to the consternation of about a third of CPGB members who wanted a reversal to a strictly pro-Kremlin line. "The Morning Star is open for genuine debate about the future of the Left", it asserted. A demonstration outside the East German embassy against the imprisonment of reformist Communist Rudolf Bahro was organised by the Morning Star that year. Also in 1977, editor Tony Chater persuaded the Labour government to begin running advertisements in the newspaper, previously absent because of a lack of audited circulation figures.

In December 1981, when the Polish Solidarity trade union movement was suppressed and martial law declared, the paper criticised the executive committee of the party for condemning the acts of the (then-Communist) Polish government. In 1982, the Morning Star attacked the attitudes of Marxism Today, the party's monthly journal, which was controlled by the Eurocommunists.

The newspaper attracted some wider media attention in September 1981 when the BBC paid to place six advertisements for its Russian-language service in the Morning Star, which was one of the few English language newspapers that the USSR government allowed to be circulated in the country. Four of these advertisements were printed as agreed, but the last two of the six were not printed. A spokesman for the newspaper said that the advertising department had not properly consulted with other teams before making the agreement, and that the BBC's broadcasts were part of Cold War propaganda. The paper supported the National Union of Mineworkers (NUM) during the miners' strike of 1984–1985, but the party had become critical of NUM leader Arthur Scargill's strategy towards the end of the strike.

Meanwhile, in March 1984, the CPGB Executive Committee (EC) issued a seven-page document which was heavily critical of editor Tony Chater, in particular because he had refused to print an article which commemorated the sixtieth anniversary of the death of Lenin. The EC put forward candidates to challenge those loyal to Chater at the 1984 AGM of the PPPS and called for Chater's replacement. He was expelled from the CPGB in January 1985, along with the assistant editor, David Whitfield, reportedly because the attempts to remove him as editor had failed. A statement by the party's EC asserted that the paper was "being systematically used to attack and undermine congress policy, support factional activities in the party, and help sectarian minority groupings in their opposition to the party majority". In June 1985, however, AGMs of the PPPS held in Glasgow, Manchester and London voted by about 60 to 40% for candidates backed by the management committee of the Morning Star.Chater remained editor of the paper until 1995 when he retired. Control of the newspaper passed from the Eurocommunist leadership of the CPGB to the newly established pro-Soviet Communist Party of Britain (CPB).

On the day before the Berlin Wall began to be demolished in 1989, under a headline reading "GDR unveils reforms package", the newspaper commented that "The German Democratic Republic is awakening", and quoting material supplied by East Germany's ruling Socialist Unity Party: "A revolutionary people's movement has set in motion a process of serious upheaval ... The aim is dynamically to give socialism more democracy"

Soviet bulk orders ended abruptly in 1989 (the Communist Party of the Soviet Union had still been buying 6,000 copies every day), and the termination of this order, with only a week's notice, was the cause of "huge financial disruption".

In the 1990s, the publication's circulation fell to 7,000, following the end of the Soviet bulk sales. There were tensions between different CPB factions over control of the paper, and in particular over the successor of Tony Chater as editor. Chief Executive Mary Rosser favoured the news editor, Paul Corry (also her son-in-law); the staff and by the unions favoured Chater's deputy, John Haylett, who was installed in February 1995. In 1998 many of its workers – then earning £10,500 a year and with no raise for 11 years – went on strike. These strikes were provoked by the sacking by Rosser of Haylett for "gross misconduct". During the protest a breakaway from the Morning Star, the Workers' Morning Star was formed, and published by a small group of journalists who worked for the Morning Star at the same time. This paper was discontinued before the end of the decade. Haylett was eventually reinstated as editor and the protests stopped, as the circulation saw a moderate increase. "Our political relationship is still with the Communist Party of Britain", he said in 2005, pointing out that only about 10% of readers were members of the party, "but now we represent a broad movement".

Although the paper is normally published from Monday to Saturday, an issue of the Morning Star was published on 13 September 2015, its first ever Sunday edition, to cover the election of Jeremy Corbyn as Leader of the Labour Party.

In December 2016, the newspaper was criticised by Labour MPs led by John Woodcock ("one of the fiercest critics of British government inaction over aid to the region", according to The Huffington Post) for its description of the imminent fall of Aleppo to Syrian government forces in a front-page headline as a "liberation". Labour MP Tom Blenkinsop tweeted: "Hard left joining with far right in welcoming dictators "liberating" Aleppo. Absolute disgrace". Other Labour MPs joining in the criticism were Stephen Doughty, Angela Smith, Ian Austin, Mike Gapes, Jess Phillips, Toby Perkins and Wes Streeting. Conservative MP George Osborne and Guardian writer Owen Jones also attacked the paper's headline. However, the paper rejected the criticism, stating that "from a purely technical point of view, when a sovereign government reclaims territory previously held by enemy forces, that's called "liberation" whether we like the outcome or not". Stop the War Coalition convener Lindsey German, and political commentator Peter Oborne defended the Star's reporting of the issue, and questioned the dominant media narrative, respectively. Jeremy Corbyn said he "disagreed" with the headline, emphasising that he always advocated a ceasefire and "a political settlement in Syria". However, he refused to say he would never buy or read the paper again, saying; "Listen, I buy lots of newspapers. I frequently disagree profoundly with headlines, even in The Guardian, the Telegraph, the Mail, and so on. Does it mean I won't buy them, or read them? Of course not."

During the late 2010s the Morning Star played a key role in helping historians uncover facts about pioneering black civil rights activist Billy Strachan.

In June 2022, the paper published a statement by the Communist Party of Britain on the 'situation in Ukraine' that stated "the war between Russia and Ukraine is part of a wider conflict between capitalist powers, between Russia on one side and Ukraine and the expansionist NATO powers on the other." It went on to call NATO "an alliance of imperialist powers". It declared the Russian military actions unjustified and called for an immediate ceasefire, but opposed sanctions.

=== Editorial line and contents ===
The newspaper describes itself as "a reader-owned co-operative and unique as a lone socialist voice in a sea of corporate media". The paper attempts to speak to the working class a group its editor described in 2015 as around 80% to 90% of the British population who work for a wage rather than living off investments or assets. Successive annual general meetings of the People's Press Printing Society have agreed that the policy of the paper is founded on Britain's Road to Socialism, the programme of the Communist Party of Britain. A profile of the paper which was published in the centre-left New Statesman magazine in 2015 commented on its contents that:

it covers industrial disputes, anti-austerity protests and international affairs in a brisk, populist tabloid style. Recently, it has earned praise for its coverage of women's sport and corruption in sport. Jeremy Corbyn, the candidate for the Labour Party leadership and Morning Star contributor, has called it "the most precious and only voice we have in the daily media", and Frances O'Grady, the TUC general secretary, says it is "essential reading for many union activists".

On international issues, the paper was historically sympathetic to the Soviet Union and its allies during the Cold War. By the 1970s it had become critical of repression in the Soviet Union, according to a contemporary Guardian editorial, but in the 1980s came into conflict with the Eurocommunist leadership of the CPB. Commentators have suggested that it maintains a fairly anti-Western worldview into the 21st century. Its attitude to the wider world has been criticised by others on the British left with Paul Anderson former editor of the democratic socialist Tribune magazine commenting that "It runs articles extolling the virtues of single-party 'socialist' states on a regular basis – North Korea, Cuba, China, Vietnam. Its default position on just about everything happening in the world is that anything any western power supports – but particularly the United States – must be opposed, which has led to it cheering on Putin, Hamas, Assad and a lot of other real nasties." The paper is sympathetic to Irish republicanism categorising reporting about Northern Ireland as foreign.

On its masthead, the paper states that it supports peace and socialism, and it is also Eurosceptic. The Morning Star and The Spectator were the only publications to campaign for an Exit vote in the 1975 referendum. Tony Benn (described as "the de facto leader of the "Out" campaign") campaigned alongside the paper. Over thirty years later the Morning Star supported the No2EU platform in the 2009 European Parliament election. The paper was also supportive of Britain's vote in 2016 to leave the EU, saying that "Anybody who supports the election of a Corbyn government with a mandate to end austerity, extend public ownership, redistribute wealth and restructure our economy in the interests of working people needs to explain how this agenda can be implemented in the framework of an EU that bans so much of it" but criticised the referendum campaign as being headed by "reactionary zealots" such as Nigel Farage, Boris Johnson and Michael Gove.

The paper advocates a vote for the Labour Party in most seats, except for the handful in which the Communist Party of Britain has a candidate. During Jeremy Corbyn's term as Labour leader, the Communist Party of Britain did not stand any candidates against Labour in the 2017 or 2019 general elections, and the Morning Star became wholly pro-Labour in this period. The paper has also received contributions from representatives of the Green movement, religious organisations as well as Scottish and Welsh nationalists.

=== Contributors and staff ===
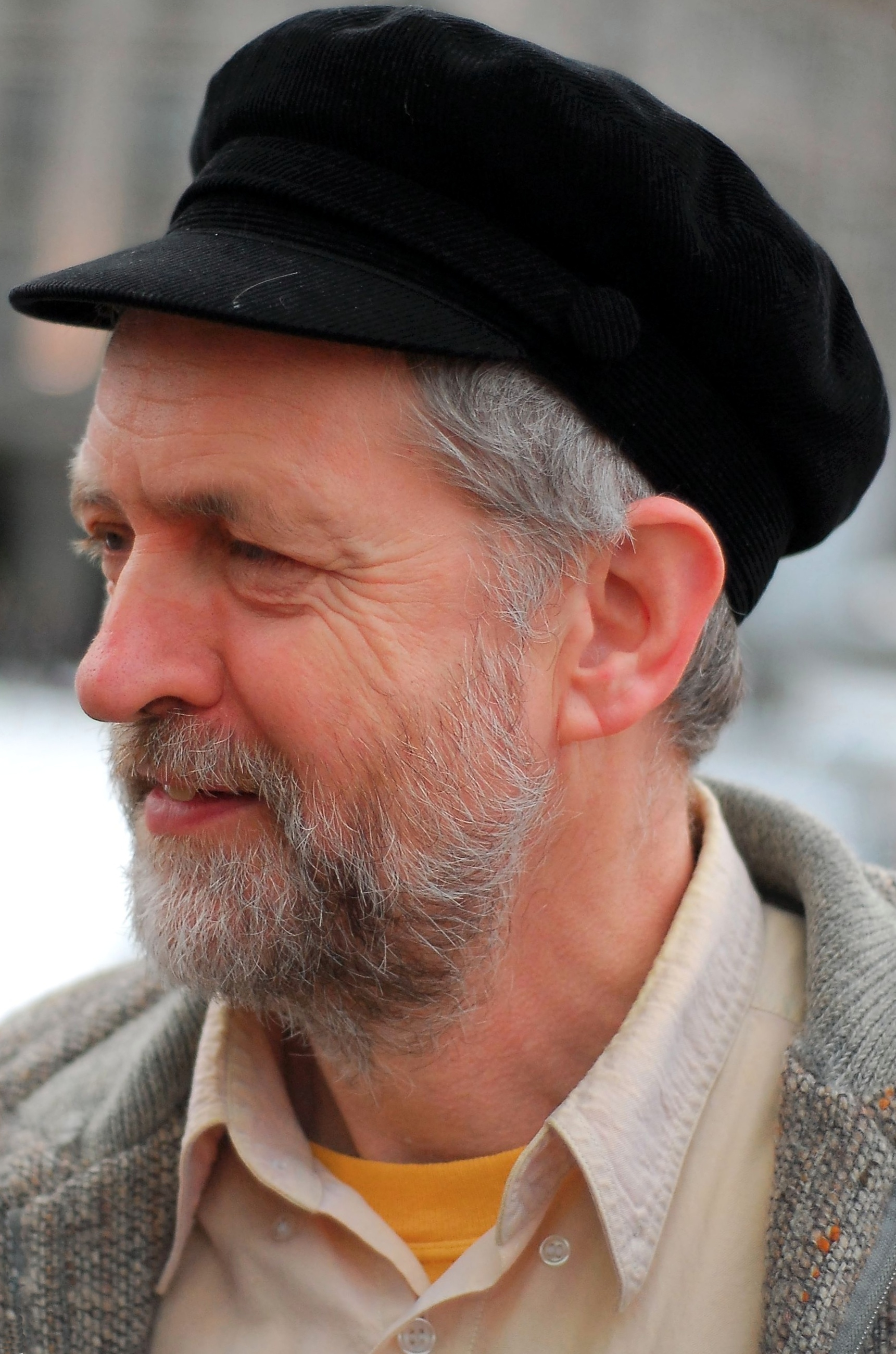
Contributor Jeremy Corbyn

In the first years of the twenty-first century, the paper has carried contributions from Uri Avnery, John Pilger, Green activist Derek Wall, ex-Mayor of London Ken Livingstone, Labour Members of Parliament (MPs) Jeremy Corbyn and John McDonnell, Green MP Caroline Lucas, former MP George Galloway (Respect), the cartoonist Martin Rowson, and many trade union general secretaries. Features are contributed by writers from a range of socialist, social democratic, green and religious perspectives. Despite this, according to then editor John Haylett in 2005: "things that happened in the Soviet Union 70 years ago are still being used as a stick to beat the Morning Star."

On 1 January 2009, Bill Benfield took over as editor of the Morning Star. John Haylett, who had been editor since 1995, took up the post of political editor. Benfield had previously been deputy editor and head of production, but experienced ill health.

In May 2012, Richard Bagley became editor of the Morning Star, having already worked at the paper in various positions since 2001. In July 2014, he stepped down as editor, with Ben Chacko becoming acting editor, a position in which Chacko was confirmed in May 2015. The newspaper "is the most precious and only voice we have in the daily media", said (then backbencher Labour MP) Jeremy Corbyn at the time of Chacko's formal appointment in May 2015. "I look forward to working with Ben in promoting socialism and progress".

=== Finances and circulation ===
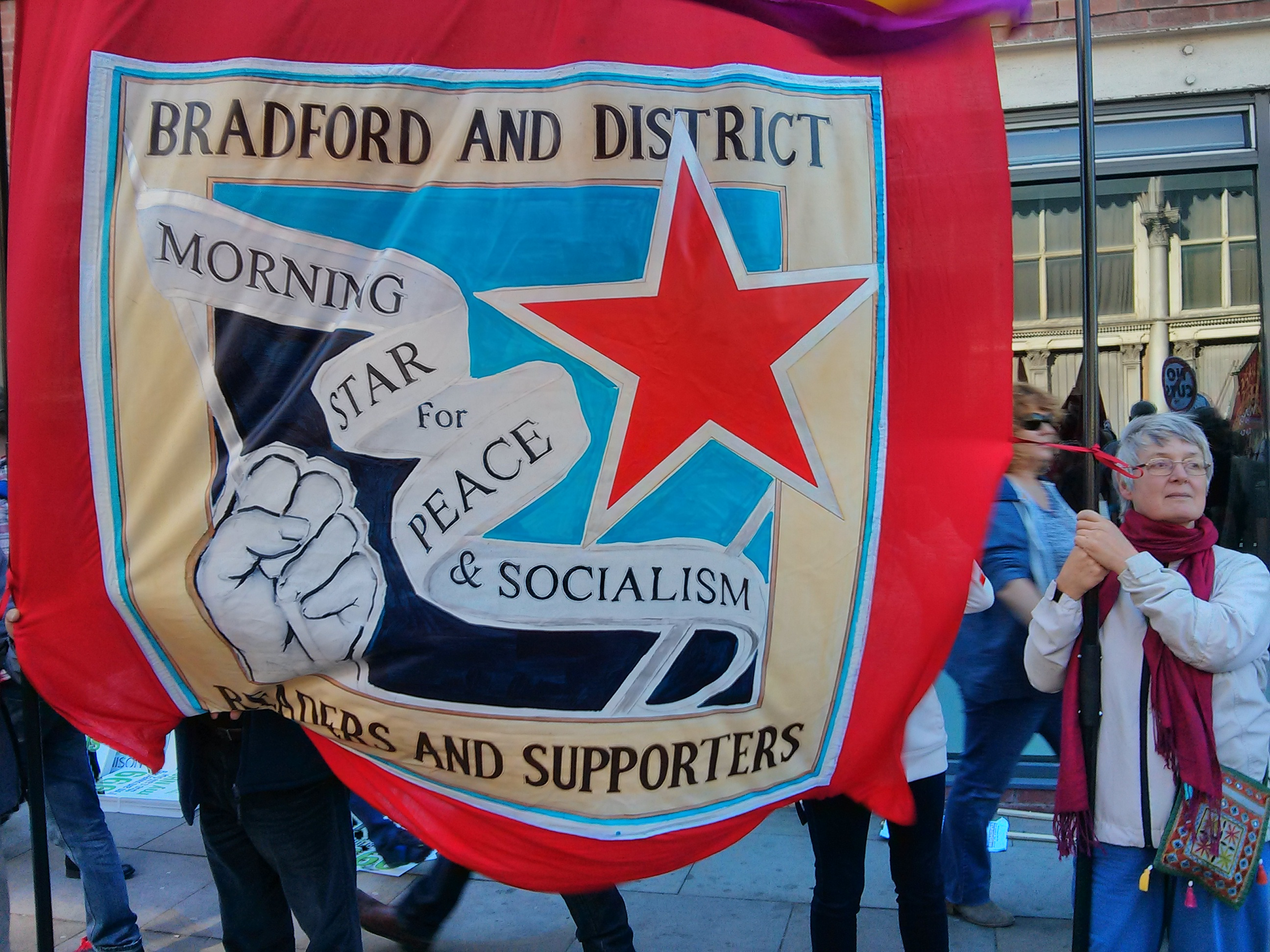
Morning Star readers and supporters banner

The Morning Star carries little commercial advertising, with low advertising rates, and the cover price does not pay for print and distribution. Consequently, the paper has always been dependent on donations from activists, readers, and trade unions. The paper relies on its "Fighting Fund" appeal (yearly target £200,000). In its past, the paper received financial support from the Soviet Union: a monthly subsidy of £3,000 during the 1960s (worth about £60,000 in 2025) and purchasing 12,000 copies daily through the 1970s and 1980s. In 1981, its circulation was about 36,000, down from the Daily Worker's post-war peak.

In March 2005, BBC News Magazine reported the Morning Star's circulation as between 13,000 and 14,000, quoting Haylett's comment "perhaps only one in 10 of these readers would label themselves as Communists". The circulation was thought to be around 10,000 when Ben Chacko took over as editor in mid-2015.

The Morning Star has also taken a much higher profile at trade union gatherings and within the UK trade union movement, particularly with unions such as Unite, GMB, UCATT, FBU, Community, CWU, NUM, Durham Miners, Prison Officers and RMT. Since 2008, the Morning Star has hired exhibition space at the Trades Union Congress, with sponsored copies being handed out to delegates at the TUC, Labour Party Conference, at union conferences and high-profile events such as the Tolpuddle Martyrs' Festival and the Durham Miners Gala. The newspaper is also available at independent newsagents and shops such as RS McColl, in local supermarkets such as Budgens, at railway stations and on motorway service areas. In addition, it is stocked by the Co-op Food chain of stores.

During the early morning of 28 July 2008, the offices of the newspaper were damaged by fire, and the edition of 29 July took a reduced form. A similar incident occurred on 20 October 2014 when a fire broke out near the offices and a small number of staff had to relocate to the sports editor's house in order to finish the paper.

On 1 June 2009, the Morning Star was re-launched. The re-launch included a 16-page edition during the week, and a 24-page weekend edition priced at £1.20 after a rise in its prices in September 2014. This rose to £1.50 in 2020. There is no Sunday edition of the newspaper. There was also an expanded use of colour pictures and graphics, plus a redesign and a modern layout of the pages. The Morning Star also redesigned its website. In addition, a number of new and experienced journalists were engaged and the positions of full-time Industrial Correspondent and Lobby Correspondent in the House of Commons were reintroduced.

In November 2011, the Morning Star launched an urgent appeal to raise £75,000 in order to address a number of funding issues which meant the paper might have gone under by the end of the year.

On Monday 18 June 2012, the Morning Star moved to printing at two Trinity Mirror print sites in Watford and Oldham, which improved distribution of the Morning Star to all parts of the country, particularly Scotland.

=== Online version ===
An online version of the paper was launched on 1 April 2004. Initially only some parts of the site were free, including a PDF of the paper's front page, the editorial "Star Comment" and all the articles from the culture and sports pages, while features and the current affairs were subscription-only. On 1 January 2009 this policy was changed, and all content was made freely available online. In April 2012, the paper launched a daily e-edition of the full newspaper, which readers can subscribe to for a charge. As of 2020, the number of articles non-subscribers can read for free is limited.

== Editors ==
As the Daily Worker:

1930: William Rust
1933: Jimmy Shields
1935: Idris Cox
1936: Rajani Palme Dutt
1938: Dave Springhall
1939: John Ross Campbell
1939: William Rust
1949: John Ross Campbell
1959: George Matthews

Chairs of the editorial board have included Hewlett Johnson (clergyman known as 'the Red Dean' of Canterbury), although he was not a member of the CPGB.

As the Morning Star:

1966: George Matthews
1974: Tony Chater
1995: John Haylett
2009: Bill Benfield
2012: Richard Bagley
2014: Ben Chacko

== See also ==
- Caribbean News
- West Indian Gazette
- The Red Republican
- History Workshop Journal

== Sources ==
- Coughlan, Sean (21 March 2005). "Pressing on". BBC News Magazine.
- Platt, Edward (4 August 2015). "Inside the Morning Star, Britain's last communist newspaper". New Statesman.
