= Guksabong (North Gyeongsang) =

Mountain in South Korea

Highest point
- Elevation: 728 m (2,388 ft)

Geography
- Location: North Gyeongsang Province, South Korea

Korean name
- Hangul: 국사봉
- Hanja: 國師峰
- RR: Guksabong
- MR: Kuksabong

Guksabong (Korean: 국사봉) is a mountain of North Gyeongsang Province, eastern South Korea. It has an elevation of 728 metres.

== See also ==
- List of mountains of Korea
