= Hermes Baby =

Portable mechanical typewriter manufactured between 1935 and 1989

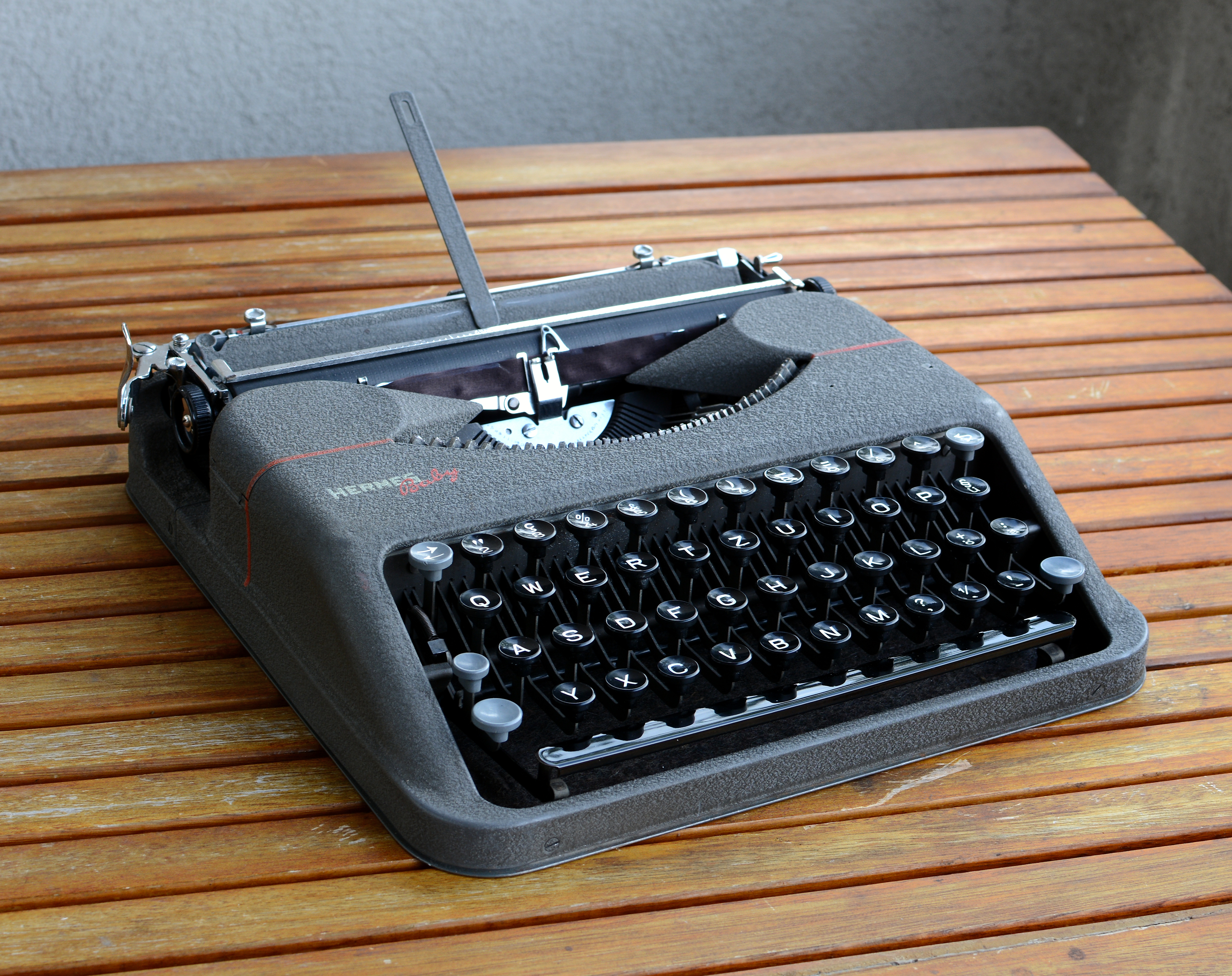
Hermes Baby, 1948

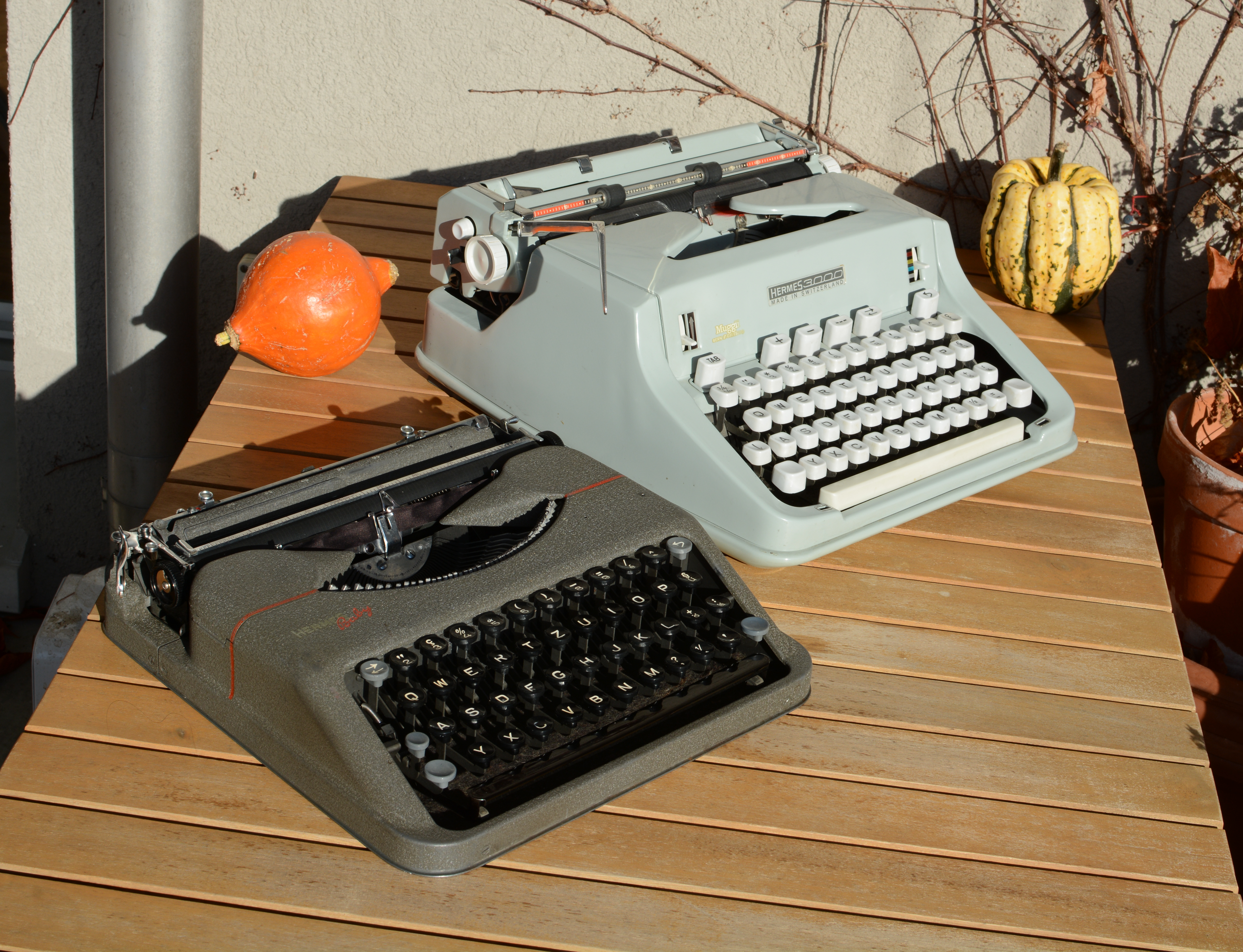
Hermes Baby (front) compared to another portable typewriter, Hermes 3000

Hermes Baby is a mechanical portable typewriter manufactured by the Swiss company Paillard SA between 1935 and 1989. It was of flat (six centimeters high) and lightweight (four kilograms) design, with an affordable price of 160 Swiss francs. Its production ceased with the advent of the digital revolution.
