= Garasan =

Mountain in South Korea

Highest point
- Elevation: 585 m (1,919 ft)

Geography
- Location: South Gyeongsang Province, South Korea

Korean name
- Hangul: 가라산
- Hanja: 加羅山
- RR: Garasan
- MR: Karasan

Garasan (Korean: 가라산) is a mountain of South Gyeongsang Province, southeastern South Korea. It has an elevation of 585 metres.

== See also ==
- List of mountains of Korea
