= People's Press Printing Society =

British co-operative publishing company

The People's Press Printing Society (PPPS) is a readers' co-operative with the purpose of owning and publishing a left-wing, British, daily newspaper. The co-operative was established in 1945, with shares sold at £1. Originally the paper was titled the Daily Worker, but the publication was re-launched as the Morning Star in 1966.

On 6 January 1946, at the Albert Hall in London, Bill Jones, the leader of the London busmen's trade union, handed over the formal document of transfer to William Rust (editor of the Daily Worker). Ownership of the Daily Worker was transferred from the Communist Party of Great Britain (CPGB) to the PPPS, with CPGB retaining editorial and political control of the paper until in 1951, the Daily Worker Co-operative Society was established to act as the nominal publishers of the paper.

The Daily Worker Co-operative Society became the Morning Star Co-operative Society which later became bankrupt and the sole ownership for the publication of the Morning Star fell under the People's Press Printing Society. The People’s Press Printing Society has a difficult financial existence, making a £41,179 loss in 2013 and a £1,137 surplus in 2014.

In 2025, the People's Press Printing Society continues its tradition of holding Annual General Meetings to engage with its readership and discuss the direction of the cooperative.

== Publications other than the Morning Star ==
- 32 Questions on the Freedom of the Press OCLC 83666530
- Science in the Atomic Age 1947 OCLC 48116435
- The People Rule in Yugoslavia, William Rust, OCLC 70486395
- Inside Free Greece: Exclusive Reports of the Greek Situation from Eudoras Joannides, Eudoras Joannides, OCLC 29106948/OCLC 83899756
- I Saw the Truth in Korea ... Facts and Photographs That Will Shock Britain!, Alan Winnington, 1950 OCLC 29770700/OCLC 24843675
- The Struggle for a Free Press, E. P. Thompson, 1952 OCLC 19959607
- USA '53; The Truth Behind Eisenhower, Derek Kartun, 1953 OCLC 11696827/OCLC 60699631
