= Alan Winnington =

British journalist and writer (1910–1983)

- Born: 16 March 1910; London, England
- Died: 26 November 1983 (aged 73); East Germany
- Resting place: Cremated ashes were scattered across Karl Marx's grave in Highgate Cemetery
- Citizenship: United Kingdom (later stateless)
- Education: Chigwell School
- Occupations: Journalist, anthropologist, war correspondent, author of children's fiction and crime thrillers, film actor, butcher shop assistant, salesman, coin counterfeiter (criminal)
- Known for: Exposing war crimes during the Korean War; First European to live among the Norsu and return alive Acting roles within numerous East German films Author of children's books and crime fiction Travelogue of Tibet
- Notable work: Breakfast With Mao, Slaves of the Cool Mountains, I saw the truth in Korea
- Political party: Communist Party of Great Britain (CPGB)

Alan Winnington (16 March 1910 – 26 November 1983) was a British journalist, war correspondent, film actor, anthropologist, and Communist activist, most notable for his coverage of the Korean War and the Chinese Civil War. In 1950, Winnington authored I saw the truth in Korea, an anti-war pamphlet containing photographic evidence of the mass graves of civilians executed by the South Korean police. The publishing of this leaflet led to the British government debating whether to have Winnington tried for treason, a charge which carried the death penalty, though it was instead decided to make him stateless by refusing to renew his passport.

As a member of the Communist Party of Great Britain (CPGB) and an Asian correspondent for The Daily Worker, Winnington travelled to China and witnessed the defeat of the KMT by the Chinese Communist Party. Now living in China, he grew close to many leading Chinese politicians including Mao Zedong, Zhou Enlai, Liu Shaoqi, and Zhu De. During the Korean War he worked closely with Wilfred Burchett, as the only two English-speaking journalists to cover the war from the North's perspective. Winnington helped to secure the fair treatment of British and American POWs captured by Chinese and North Korean forces.

Now permanently living in China, Winnington undertook an ethnographic study of isolated regions in South-West China. He travelled to Norsu territory in Sichuan to document the abolition of slavery by the Chinese Communist Party, interviewing freed slaves and former headhunters, becoming the first European to live within a Norsu community and return alive. He also lived among the Wa people, interviewing their shamans and headhunters. His findings were published in his book Slaves of the Cool Mountains (1959). Winnington also travelled to Tibet as an honoured guest of both the Dalai Lama and Panchen Lama, experiences which he recorded in the travelog Tibet (1957). His positive reputation with both Chinese communists and Tibetan Buddhist placed Winnington in a position to obtain a greater insight into Tibetan life in the 1950s than most other journalist. After becoming disillusioned with Chinese politics and suffering constant harassment, he left China in 1960 with the help of Harry Pollitt and moved to East Germany. He spent the remainder of his life in East Germany, working as an author of crime-fiction, children's books, and starring as a movie actor in various films. His autobiography Breakfast With Mao (1986) was published posthumously.

As of 2021 Winnington's work was being used by activists and historians to uncover the location of mass graves in Taejon in preparation for an upcoming peace park.

== Early career ==
Although Winnington came from a working-class family, he won a scholarship to the private Chigwell School in Essex. He said that because of his working-class background and his entry via a scholarship, he was discriminated against by both Chigwell's staff and pupils.

Winnington said that in his youth he made a living during the Depression by making counterfeit silver coins.

Winnington became a member of the Communist Party of Great Britain (CPGB) British Communist Party around 1934. He became a branch secretary in Walthamstow after finding the party through discussions with leading British communist Harry Pollitt. After earning a press pass with the National Union of Journalists, Winnington became the press officer of the CPGB and was appointed chief editor of The Daily Worker (later renamed the Morning Star) for six years. In 1948 Winnington travelled to China to advise the Chinese Communist Party's information services. He accompanied the People's Liberation Army in the final stages of the Chinese Civil War. Around this time he began working with Xinhua news department in Beijing.

They don't know why they're fighting

I asked every prisoner I met: "Why are you fighting in Korea?" Not one could give a clear answer. Most said: "I don't know." Some said: "It's something to do with the United Nations, they told us." A few had heard of Rhee. None knew of Kim Ir Sen. With one or two exceptions, Privates, nearly all teen-agers, said they had joined the army to "see the world", "get out of the draft" or "save some money".

— Alan Winnington, I saw the Truth in Korea (1950), page 8 – Interviews with American POWs

== Korean War – "I saw the truth in Korea" ==
In 1950 Winnington became one of only two Western English-speaking correspondents to accompany communist forces in the Korean War, the other being Australian journalist Wilfred Burchett. Within his study of war correspondents, professor of Journalism Phillip Knightley wrote that "Burchett and Winnington were a better source of news than the UN information officers, and if the allied reporters did not see them they risked being beaten on stories". Despite a ban on communications with communist journalists such as Burchett and Winnington, many British and American journalists ignored the ban, as their reports from the communist side were considered too valuable and important to miss and more trustworthy than official UN sources. Winnington was also present with Burchett during Korean War peace talks in Kaesong, 1951.

In August 1950 Winnington published a pamphlet titled I saw the truth in Korea with photographic evidence of mass graveyards containing the corpses 7,000 civilians executed by South Korean police near Taejon. Embarrassed by Winnington's leaflet, the Cabinet of the British government debated whether they could charge him with "treason", which if found guilty could lead to a death sentence. He was also accused of being involved in the interrogation of British prisoners of war in Korea. Though Winnington met with many British POWs held by the communist forces in Korea as he interviewed them and helped to improve their conditions, none of them has ever confirmed that Winnington took part in interrogations.

An investigation in 1999 leading to declassified US military archives later confirmed Winnington's claims that there was indeed a mass execution of civilians by South Korean forces near Taejon as was documented within I saw the truth in Korea.

== Study of Chinese slavery and headhunting ==
In 1954 Winnington's passport expired and was not renewed by the British government authorities making him virtually stateless (though it was eventually renewed in 1968). Unable to return to Britain he decided to continue living in China. After hearing news of slave-owning societies in south China which had been virtually untouched by the Chinese Civil War and Communist Revolution, he set out to investigate. During his journey to investigate slave-owning societies he also travelled to the China-Burma border to interview head-hunters of the Wa people and the relatively peaceful Jingpaw (Jingpo). His findings were published in an anthropological study titled "Slaves of the Cool Mountains: Travels Among The Head-hunters and Slave Owners in South-west China".

=== Slavery ===
In Liangshan (literally meaning 'cool mountains') in China's southwest between Sichuan and Yunnan, there existed a complex system of slavery and nobility among the Yi people (often called Lolo, Nuosu, though Winnington called them Norsu). The Yi people were split into three social classes; the nuohuo or Black Yi (nobles), qunuo or White Yi (commoners), and slaves. The White Yi were free and could own slaves and property but were bound to a lord. Other ethnic groups in Liangshan including Hans were held as slaves by the Yi. During the 1950s the Chinese Communist Party attempted to abolish the practice of slavery in rural China, a process which Winnington recorded in his writings. However, slavery as a way of life was so deeply entrenched within Yi society that it took years to convince the people, including many of the slaves themselves, that the system of slavery could be abolished. During his time in Liangshi, Winnington spent months interviewing Yi people from all social classes including slaves, slave owners, commoners and nobility.

=== Head-hunters ===
After months with in Liangshan, Winnington travelled to the border between China and Burma to meet the Wa people, many of whom practiced head-hunting and would keep severed heads in baskets in an attempt to promote crop growth. Winnington wrote that by the time he was able to interview and record the Wa, including numerous head-hunters, the practice of head-hunting was already in the process of being abolished. Winnington found that many of the Wa he interviewed viewed head-hunting as an embarrassing and shameful practice that they would be happy to see abolished.

== Life in East Germany ==
After becoming disillusioned with Chinese politics and suffering constant harassment, he left China in 1960 with the help of Harry Pollitt and moved to East Germany. Winnington arrived in Germany as the Daily Worker's East Berlin correspondent. His family and children instead travelled to Britain without Winnington. He started a new family in Germany and married a woman called Ursula Wittbrodt, who later became Ursula Winnington in 1967. While in Germany, he worked as a foreign correspondent for the Daily Worker and occasionally as an advisor on Asian politics for the East German government.

He began writing fiction alongside his work as a journalist, mostly novels of the crime-fiction genre.

In 1980, Winnington wrote his autobiography, Breakfast with Mao, which was published posthumously in 1986, after his death in 1983.

== Works ==
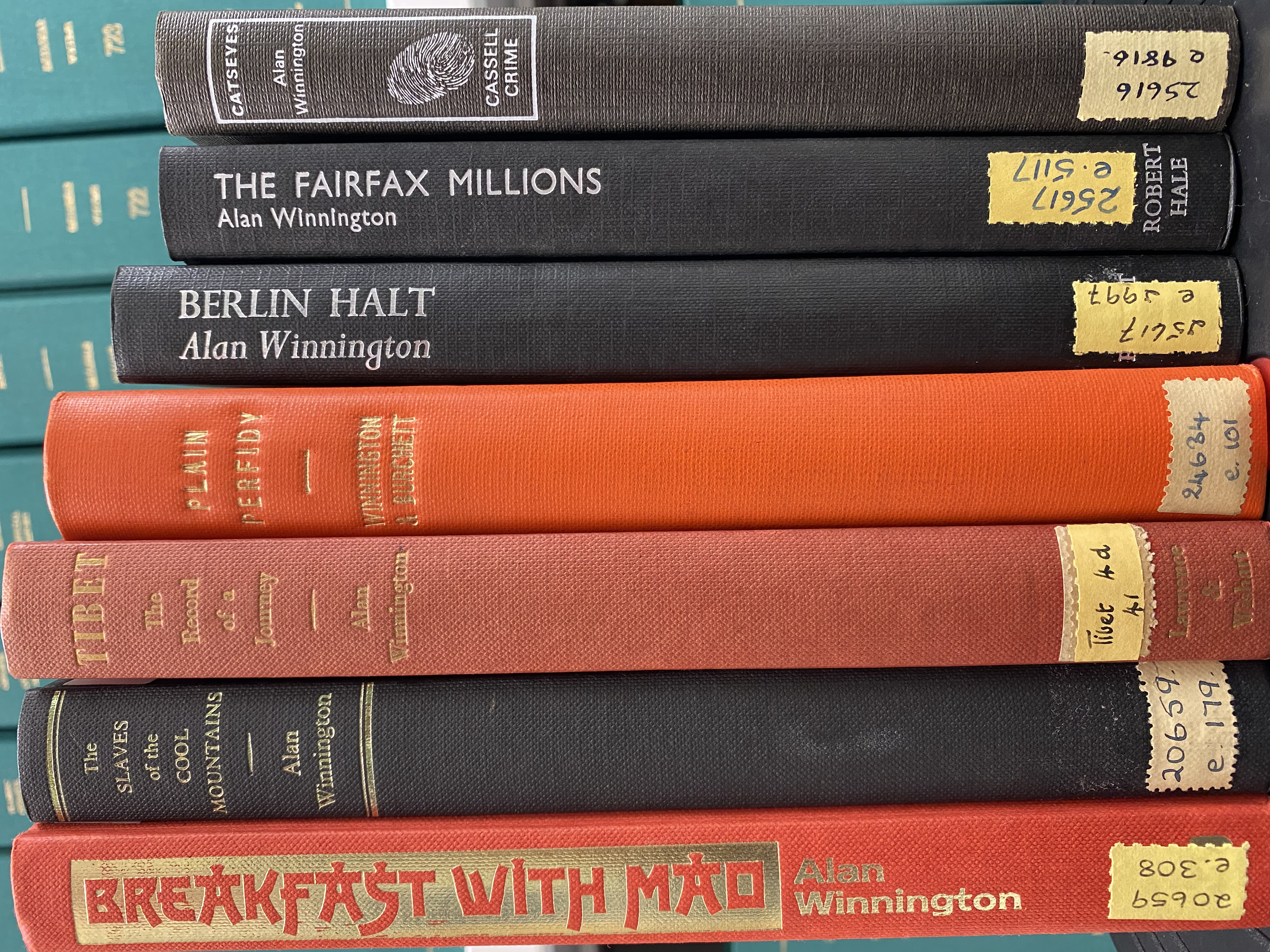
A sample of books written by Alan Winnington

=== English language publications ===
- Hints on Public Speaking. Communist Party of Great Britain, 1943.
- Koje Unscreened. Britain-China Friendship Association, 1953.
- I saw the truth in Korea. London: People's Press Printing Society, 1950.
- Plain Perfidy: The Plot To Wreck Korean Peace. Britain-China Friendship Association, 1954.
- Tibet: Record of a Journey. Lawrence and Wishart, 1957.
- The Slaves of the Cool Mountains. Lawrence and Wishart, 1959.
- Catseyes. Cassell & Co., 1967.
- Berlin Halt. Robert Hale Ltd., 1973.
- Fairfax Millions. Robert Hale Ltd., 1974.
- Breakfast with Mao: Memoirs of a foreign correspondent. London: Lawrence and Wishart, 1986.
- From London to Beijing: Memories 1914 - 1960. Verlag Das Neue Berlin, 1989.

=== German language publications ===
- Tibet: ein Reisebericht. Volk und Welt, 1960.
- Himmel muss warten: Abendteuerroman. Verlag Das Neue Berlin, 1963.
- Kopfjäger: Abenteuerroman. Verlag Das Neue Berlin, 1965.
- Gullet und die Todeskurve: zwei Kriminalromane. Verlag Das Neue Berlin, 1966.
- Silberhuf. Kinderbuchverlag, 1969.
- Der Totgeglaubte: Kriminalroman. Verlag Das Neue Berlin, 1970.
- Silberhuf zieht in den Krieg. Kinderbuchverlag, 1972.
- Küche anderer Länder. Verlag für die Frau, 1972.
- Herzversagen. Verlag Das Neue Berlin, 1974.
- Duel in Tschungking: Roman. Verlag Das Neue Berlin, 1978.
- Anglers Alibi: 15 Kriminalgeschichten. Verlag Das Neue Berlin, 1980.
- Der Doppelagent: Roman. Verlag Das Neue Berlin, Berlin, 1981.
- Ridley and Son. Verlag Das Neue Berlin, 1981.
- Tibet: die wahre Geschichte. Verlag Das Neue Berlin, 1981.
- Von London nach Peking: Erinnerungen 1914-1960. Verlag Das Neue Berlin, 1989.
