= List of elections in 1951 =

The following elections occurred in the year 1951:

== Africa ==
- 1951 Gold Coast legislative election
- 1951 Liberian general election

== Asia ==
- 1951–52 Burmese general election
- 1951 Cambodian general election
- India:
  - 1951 Indian general election
  - 1951–1971 Indian general elections
  - Indian general election in Madras, 1951
- 1951 Israeli legislative election
- 1951 Israeli presidential election
- 1951 Jordanian general election
- 1951 Laotian parliamentary election
- 1951 Lebanese general election
- 1951 Malayan local elections
- 1951 Mongolian parliamentary election
- 1951 Philippine Senate election
- 1951 Singaporean general election
- 1951 Soviet Union regional elections
- 1950–51 Taiwanese local elections

== Australia ==
- 1951 Australian federal election
- 1951 Australian referendum
- 1951 Balaclava by-election
- 1951 Burwood state by-election
- 1951 Macquarie by-election
- 1951 Neutral Bay state by-election
- 1951 Prahran state by-election

== Europe ==
- 1951 Austrian presidential election
- 1951 Danish Landsting election
- 1951 East German referendum
- 1951 Finnish parliamentary election
- 1951 French legislative election
- Germany: 1951 Rhineland-Palatinate state election
- 1951 Greek legislative election
- 1951 Irish general election
- 1951 Italian local elections
- 1951 Liechtenstein local elections
- 1951 Luxembourg general election
- 1951 Maltese general election
- 1951 Norwegian local elections
- 1951 Portuguese presidential election
- 1951 San Marino general election
- 1951 Serbian parliamentary election
- 1951 Soviet Union regional elections
- 1951 Swiss federal election
- 1951 Swiss referendums

=== United Kingdom ===
- 1951 United Kingdom general election
  - England: 1951 United Kingdom general election in England
  - Scotland: 1951 United Kingdom general election in Scotland
  - Wales: 1951 United Kingdom general election in Wales
  - Northern Ireland: 1951 United Kingdom general election in Northern Ireland
  - List of MPs elected in the 1951 United Kingdom general election
- 1951 Bristol West by-election
- 1951 Harrow West by-election
- 1951 Londonderry by-election
- 1951 Ormskirk by-election
- 1951 Westhoughton by-election
- 1951 Woolwich East by-election

== America ==
- 1951 Argentine general election
- 1951 Antigua and Barbuda general election
- 1951 Bolivian general election
- 1951 Colombian parliamentary election

=== Canada ===
- Canada
  - 1951 Edmonton municipal election
  - 1951 Newfoundland general election
  - 1951 Northwest Territories general election
  - 1951 Ontario general election
  - 1951 Prince Edward Island general election
  - 1951 Toronto municipal election

=== United States ===
==== United States gubernatorial ====
- 1951 Kentucky gubernatorial election
- 1951 Mississippi gubernatorial election
- 1951 United States gubernatorial elections

==== United States House of Representatives ====
- 1951 United States House of Representatives elections

==== United States mayoral elections ====
- 1951 Baltimore mayoral election
- 1951 Chicago mayoral election
- 1951 Cleveland mayoral election
- 1951 Evansville mayoral election
- 1951 Hartford, Connecticut mayoral election
- 1951 Manchester, New Hampshire mayoral election
- 1951 Philadelphia mayoral election
- 1951 San Diego mayoral election
- 1951 San Francisco mayoral election
- 1951 Springfield mayoral election
