= List of MPs for constituencies in Wales (1951–1955) =

This is a list of members of Parliament (MPs) elected to the House of Commons of the United Kingdom by Welsh constituencies for the Fortieth Parliament of the United Kingdom (1951–1955).

Most MPs elected for Welsh constituencies at the 1951 United Kingdom general election, held on 25 October 1951, served a full term, but there was one by-election.

The list is sorted by the name of the MP.

== Composition ==
Affiliation	Members
Labour Party	27
Conservative Party	5
Liberal Party	3
National Liberal	1
Total	36

== MPs ==
MP	Constituency	Party	In constituency since
Aneurin Bevan	Ebbw Vale	Labour Party	1929
Nigel Birch	West Flintshire	Conservative Party	1950
Roderic Bowen	Cardiganshire	Liberal Party	1945
James Callaghan	Cardiff South East	Labour Party	1945
William Cove	Abervaon	Labour Party	1929
Clement Davies	Montgomeryshire	Liberal Party	1929
S. O. Davies	Merthyr Tydfil	Labour Party	1934 by-election
Desmond Donnelly	Pembrokeshire	Labour Party	1950
Ness Edwards	Caerphilly	Labour Party	1939 by-election
Garner Evans	Denbigh	National Liberal	1950
Harold Finch	Bedwellty	Labour Party	1950
Peter Freeman	Newport	Labour Party	1945
Raymond Gower	Barry	Conservative Party	1951
David Grenfell	Gower	Labour Party	1922
Jim Griffiths	Llanelli	Labour Party	1936 by-election
Cledwyn Hughes	Anglesey	Labour Party	1951
Thomas Jones	Merioneth	Labour Party	1951
David Llewellyn	Cardiff North	Conservative Party	1950
William Mainwaring	Rhondda East	Labour Party	1933 by-election
Percy Morris	Swansea West	Labour Party	1945
Rhys Hopkin Morris	Carmarthen	Liberal Party	1945
David Mort	Swansea East	Labour Party	1940 by-election
Walter Padley	Ogmore	Labour Party	1950
Arthur Pearson	Pontypridd	Labour Party	1938 by-election
Robert Richards	Wrexham	Labour Party	1935
Goronwy Roberts	Caernarfon	Labour Party	1950
David Thomas	Aberdare	Labour Party	1946 by-election
George Thomas	Cardiff West	Labour Party	1945
Iorwerth Thomas	Rhondda West	Labour Party	1950
Peter Thomas	Conwy	Conservative Party	1951
Peter Thorneycroft	Monmouth	Conservative Party	1945 by-election
Tudor Watkins	Brecon and Radnor	Labour Party	1945
Granville West	Pontypool	Labour Party	1946 by-election
D. J. Williams	Neath	Labour Party	1945 by-election
Llywelyn Williams	Abertillery	Labour Party	1950 by-election
Eirene White	East Flintshire	Labour Party	1950

== By-elections ==
There was one by-election during this period:

- 1954 Aberdare by-election won by Arthur Probert

== See also ==
- 1951 United Kingdom general election
