= List of MPs elected in the 1951 United Kingdom general election =

1951–1955 Parliament of the United Kingdom
←	1950–1951 Parliament	1955–1959 Parliament	→
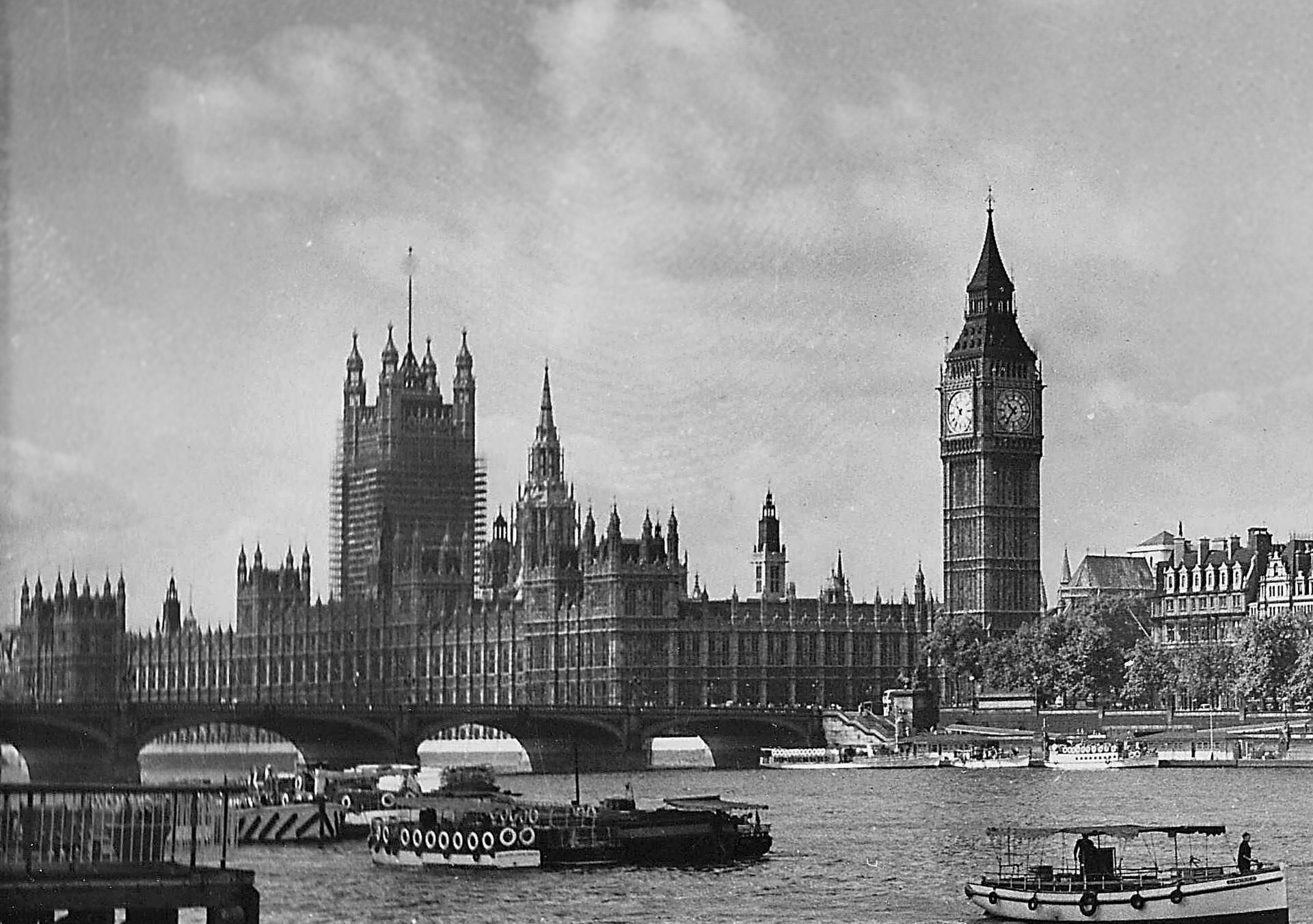
- Palace of Westminster in 1952

Overview
- Legislative body: Parliament of the United Kingdom
- Term: 26 October 1951 – 5 April 1955
- Election: 1951 United Kingdom general election
- Government: Third Churchill ministry

House of Commons
- Members: 625
- Speaker: Douglas Clifton Brown; William Morrison
- Leader: Harry Crookshank
- Prime Minister: Sir Winston Churchill
- Leader of the Opposition: Clement Attlee
- Third-party leader: Clement Davies

House of Lords
- Lord Chancellor: Viscount Simonds; Earl of Kilmuir

Crown-in-Parliament George VI → Elizabeth II

Sessions
- 1st: 31 October 1951 – 30 October 1952
- 2nd: 4 November 1952 – 29 October 1953
- 3rd: 3 November 1953 – 25 November 1954
- 4th: 30 November 1954 – 6 May 1955

This is a list of members of parliament elected to the Parliament of the United Kingdom at the 1951 general election, held on 25 October 1951. A total of 625 MPs were elected.

Notable newcomers to the House of Commons included Anthony Barber, Lord Lambton and Ted Short.

== Composition ==
These representative diagrams show the composition of the parties in the 1951 general election.

Note: This is not the official seating plan of the House of Commons, which has five rows of benches on each side, with the government party to the right of the speaker and opposition parties to the left, but with room for only around two-thirds of MPs to sit at any one time.

Affiliation	Members
Conservative Party*	302
Labour Party	295
National Liberal*	19
Liberal Party	6
Independent Nationalist	2
Irish Labour	1
Total	625
Effective government majority	16 (total strength)

- The National Liberals were in alliance with the Conservatives, bringing total Conservative strength to 321 seats.

This is a complete list of Members of Parliament elected to the Parliament of the United Kingdom at the 1951 general election on 25 October 1951.

== A ==
Constituency	MP	Party
Aberavon	William Cove	Labour
Aberdare	David Thomas	Labour
Aberdeen North	Hector Hughes	Labour
Aberdeen South	Lady Tweedsmuir	Conservative
Aberdeenshire East	Robert Boothby	Conservative
Aberdeenshire West	Henry Spence	Conservative
Abertillery	Rev. Llywelyn Williams	Labour
Abingdon	Sir Ralph Glyn	Conservative
Accrington	Harry Hynd	Labour
Acton	Joseph Sparks	Labour
Aldershot	Oliver Lyttelton	Conservative
Altrincham and Sale	Frederick Erroll	Conservative
Anglesey	Cledwyn Hughes	Labour
Angus North and Mearns	Colin Thornton-Kemsley	Conservative & National Liberal
Angus South	James Duncan	Conservative & National Liberal
Antrim, North	Hon. Hugh O'Neill	Ulster Unionist
Antrim, South	Douglas Savory	Ulster Unionist
Argyll	Duncan McCallum	Conservative
Armagh	Richard Harden	Ulster Unionist
Arundel and Shoreham	William Cuthbert	Conservative
Ashford	Bill Deedes	Conservative
Ashton-under-Lyne	Hervey Rhodes	Labour
Aylesbury	Spencer Summers	Conservative
Ayr	Sir Thomas Moore	Conservative
Ayrshire, Central	Archie Manuel	Labour
Ayrshire North and Bute	Sir Charles MacAndrew	Conservative
Ayrshire South	Emrys Hughes	Labour
== B ==
Banbury	Douglas Dodds-Parker	Conservative
Banffshire	William Duthie	Conservative
Barking	Somerville Hastings	Labour
Barkston Ash	Col. Leonard Ropner	Conservative
Barnet	Reginald Maudling	Conservative
Barnsley	Sidney Schofield °	Labour
Barrow-in-Furness	Walter Monslow	Labour
Barry	Raymond Gower	Conservative
Basingstoke	Patrick Donner	Conservative
Bassetlaw	Fred Bellenger	Labour
Bath	James Pitman	Conservative
Batley and Morley	Dr Alfred Broughton	Labour
Battersea North	Douglas Jay	Labour
Battersea South	Ernest Partridge	Conservative
Bebington	Hendrie Oakshott	Conservative
Beckenham	Patrick Buchan-Hepburn	Conservative
Bedford	Capt. Christopher Soames	Conservative
Bedfordshire Mid	Alan Lennox-Boyd	Conservative
Bedfordshire South	Norman Cole	Conservative & National Liberal
Bedwellty	Harold Finch	Labour
Belfast, East	Alan McKibbin	Ulster Unionist
Belfast, North	Montgomery Hyde	Ulster Unionist
Belfast, South	Conolly Gage	Ulster Unionist
Belfast, West	Jack Beattie	Irish Labour
Belper	George Brown	Labour
Bermondsey	Bob Mellish	Labour
Berwick and East Lothian	Maj. William Anstruther-Gray	Conservative
Berwick-upon-Tweed	Antony Lambton	Conservative
Bethnal Green	Percy Holman	Co-op & Labour
Beverley	George Odey	Conservative
Bexley	Edward Heath	Conservative
Billericay	Bernard Braine	Conservative
Bilston	Will Nally	Co-op & Labour
Birkenhead	Percy Collick	Labour
Birmingham Aston	Woodrow Wyatt	Labour
Birmingham Edgbaston	Sir Peter Bennett	Conservative
Birmingham Erdington	Julius Silverman	Labour
Birmingham Hall Green	Aubrey Jones	Conservative
Birmingham Handsworth	Sir Edward Boyle	Conservative
Birmingham King's Norton	Geoffrey Lloyd	Conservative
Birmingham Ladywood	Victor Yates	Labour
Birmingham Northfield	Donald Chapman	Labour
Birmingham Perry Barr	Cecil Poole	Labour
Birmingham Small Heath	Fred Longden	Co-op & Labour
Birmingham Sparkbrook	Percy Shurmer	Labour
Birmingham Stechford	Roy Jenkins	Labour
Birmingham Yardley	Henry Usborne	Labour
Bishop Auckland	Hugh Dalton	Labour
Blackburn East	Barbara Castle	Labour
Blackburn West	Ralph Assheton	Conservative
Blackpool North	Austin Low	Conservative
Blackpool South	Wg. Cdr. Roland Robinson	Conservative
Blaydon	William Whiteley	Labour
Blyth	Alfred Robens	Labour
Bodmin	Douglas Marshall	Conservative
Bolsover	Harold Neal	Labour
Bolton East	Philip Bell	Conservative
Bolton West	Arthur Holt	Liberal
Bootle	John Kinley	Labour
Bosworth	Arthur Allen	Labour
Bothwell	John Timmons	Labour
Bournemouth East and Christchurch	Brendan Bracken	Conservative
Bournemouth West	Viscount Cranborne	Conservative
Bradford Central	Maurice Webb	Labour
Bradford East	Frank McLeavy	Labour
Bradford North	William Taylor	Conservative & Nat. Liberal
Bradford South	George Craddock	Labour
Brecon and Radnor	Tudor Watkins	Labour
Brentford and Chiswick	Laddie Lucas	Conservative
Bridgwater	Gerald Wills	Conservative
Bridlington	Hon. Richard Wood	Conservative
Brierley Hill	Charles Simmons	Labour
Brigg	Lance Mallalieu	Labour
Brighouse and Spenborough	John Edwards	Labour
Brighton Kemptown	Howard Johnson	Conservative
Brighton Pavilion	William Teeling	Conservative
Bristol Central	Stan Awbery	Labour
Bristol North-East	William Coldrick	Co-op & Labour
Bristol North-West	Lt.-Cmdr. Gurney Braithwaite	Conservative
Bristol South	William Wilkins	Labour
Bristol South-East	Tony Benn	Labour
Bristol West	Sir Walter Monckton	Conservative
Brixton	Lt.-Col. Marcus Lipton	Labour
Bromley	Harold Macmillan	Conservative
Bromsgrove	Michael Higgs	Conservative
Broxtowe	Seymour Cocks	Labour
Buckingham	Frank Markham	Conservative
Buckinghamshire South	Ronald Bell	Conservative
Burnley	Wilfrid Burke	Labour
Burton	Arthur Colegate	Conservative
Bury and Radcliffe	Walter Fletcher	Conservative
Bury St Edmunds	William Aitken	Conservative
== C ==
Caernarvon	Goronwy Roberts	Labour
Caerphilly	Ness Edwards	Labour
Caithness and Sutherland	Sir David Robertson	Conservative
Cambridge	Hamilton Kerr	Conservative
Cambridgeshire	Gerald Howard	Conservative
Cannock	Jennie Lee	Labour
Canterbury	John Baker White	Conservative
Cardiff North	David Llewellyn	Conservative
Cardiff South-East	James Callaghan	Labour
Cardiff West	George Thomas	Labour
Carlton	Kenneth Pickthorn	Conservative
Cardigan	Roderic Bowen	Liberal
Carlisle	Alfred Hargreaves	Labour
Carmarthen	Rhys Hopkin Morris	Liberal
Carshalton	Brig. Antony Head	Conservative
Cheadle	William Shepherd	Conservative
Chelmsford	Hubert Ashton	Conservative
Chelsea	Cmdr. Allan Noble	Conservative
Cheltenham	Maj. W. W. Hicks Beach	Conservative
Chertsey	Lionel Heald	Conservative
Chesterfield	George Benson	Labour
Chester-le-Street	Patrick Bartley	Labour
Chichester	Lancelot Joynson-Hicks	Conservative
Chippenham	David Eccles	Conservative
Chislehurst	Patricia Hornsby-Smith	Conservative
Chorley	Clifford Kenyon	Labour
Cirencester and Tewkesbury	William Morrison	Conservative
City of Chester	Basil Nield	Conservative
Cities of London and Westminster	Sir Harold Webbe	Conservative
Clapham	Charles Gibson	Labour
Cleveland	George Willey	Labour
Clitheroe	Richard Fort	Conservative
Coatbridge and Airdrie	Jean Mann	Labour
Colchester	Cuthbert Alport	Conservative
Colne Valley	Glenvil Hall	Labour
Consett	James Glanville	Labour
Conway	Peter Thomas	Conservative
Cornwall North	Sir Harold Roper	Conservative
Coventry East	Richard Crossman	Labour
Coventry North	Maurice Edelman	Labour
Coventry South	Elaine Burton	Labour
Crewe	Scholefield Allen	Labour
Crosby	Capt. Malcolm Bullock	Conservative
Croydon East	Sir Herbert Williams	Conservative
Croydon, North	Fred Harris	Conservative
Croydon West	Richard Thompson	Conservative
== D ==
Dagenham	John Parker	Labour
Darlington	Sir Fergus Graham	Conservative
Dartford	Norman Dodds	Co-op & Labour
Darwen	Charles Fletcher-Cooke	Conservative
Dearne Valley	Wilfred Paling	Labour
Denbigh	Garner Evans	National Liberal
Deptford	Sir Leslie Plummer	Labour
Derby North	Gp. Capt. Clifford Wilcock	Labour
Derby South	Philip Noel-Baker	Labour
Derbyshire North-East	Henry White	Labour
Derbyshire South-East	Arthur Champion	Labour
Derbyshire, West	Edward Wakefield	Conservative
Devizes	Christopher Hollis	Conservative
Devon, North	Brig. Christopher Peto	Conservative
Dewsbury	William Paling	Labour
Doncaster	Anthony Barber	Conservative
Don Valley	Tom Williams	Labour
Dorking	Gordon Touche	Conservative
Dorset North	Robert Crouch	Conservative
Dorset, South	Victor Montagu	Conservative
Dorset West	Simon Wingfield Digby	Conservative
Dover	John Arbuthnot	Conservative
Down, North	Sir Walter Smiles	Ulster Unionist
Down, South	Capt. Lawrence Orr	Ulster Unionist
Droylsden	William Williams	Labour
Dudley	George Wigg	Labour
Dulwich	Robert Jenkins	Conservative
Dumfries	Maj. Niall Macpherson	National Liberal & Conservative
Dunbartonshire, East	Cyril Bence	Labour
Dunbartonshire, West	Tom Steele	Labour
Dundee, East	Thomas Cook	Labour
Dundee, West	John Strachey	Labour
Dunfermline Burghs	James Clunie	Labour
Durham	Charles Grey	Labour
Durham North-West	James Murray	Labour
== E ==
Ealing North	James Hudson	Co-op & Labour
Ealing South	Angus Maude	Conservative
Easington	Manny Shinwell	Labour
East Ham North	Percy Daines	Co-op & Labour
East Ham South	Alfred Barnes	Co-op & Labour
Eastbourne	Charles Taylor	Conservative
East Grinstead	Col. Ralph Clarke	Conservative
Ebbw Vale	Aneurin Bevan	Labour
Eccles	William Proctor	Labour
Edinburgh Central	Thomas Oswald	Labour
Edinburgh East	John Wheatley	Labour
Edinburgh Leith	James Hoy	Labour
Edinburgh North	James Latham Clyde	Conservative
Edinburgh Pentlands	John Hope	Conservative
Edinburgh South	Sir William Darling	Conservative
Edinburgh West	Lt.-Cmdr. Ian Clark Hutchison	Conservative
Edmonton	Austen Albu	Labour
Enfield East	Ernest Davies	Labour
Enfield West	Iain Macleod	Conservative
Epping	Graeme Finlay	Conservative
Epsom	Malcolm McCorquodale	Conservative
Esher	William Robson Brown	Conservative
Eton and Slough	Fenner Brockway	Labour
Exeter	Rolf Dudley-Williams	Conservative
Eye	Harwood Harrison	Conservative
== F ==
Falmouth and Camborne	Frank Hayman	Labour
Farnham	Godfrey Nicholson	Conservative
Farnworth	George Tomlinson	Labour
Faversham	Percy Wells	Labour
Fermanagh and South Tyrone	Cahir Healy	National Party of Northern Ireland
Fife East	James Henderson-Stewart	National Liberal & Conservative
Fife West	Willie Hamilton	Labour
Finchley	Capt. John Crowder	Conservative
Flint East	Eirene White	Labour
Flint West	Nigel Birch	Conservative
Folkestone and Hythe	Brig. Harry Mackeson	Conservative
Fulham East	Michael Stewart	Labour
Fulham West	Dr Edith Summerskill	Labour
Fylde North	Hon. Richard Stanley	Conservative
Fylde South	Col. Claude Lancaster	Conservative
== G ==
Gainsborough	Capt. Harry Crookshank	Conservative
Galloway	John Mackie	Conservative
Gateshead East	Arthur Moody	Labour
Gateshead West	John Hall	Labour
Gillingham	Frederick Burden	Conservative
Glasgow Bridgeton	James Carmichael	Labour
Glasgow Camlachie	William Reid	Labour
Glasgow Cathcart	John Henderson	Conservative
Glasgow Central	James McInnes	Labour
Glasgow Gorbals	Alice Cullen	Labour
Glasgow Govan	Jack Browne	Conservative
Glasgow Hillhead	Tam Galbraith	Conservative
Glasgow Kelvingrove	Walter Elliot	Conservative
Glasgow Maryhill	William Hannan	Labour
Glasgow Pollok	Thomas Galbraith	Conservative
Glasgow Scotstoun	James Hutchison	Conservative
Glasgow Shettleston	John McGovern	Labour
Glasgow Springburn	John Forman	Co-op & Labour
Glasgow Tradeston	John Rankin	Co-op & Labour
Glasgow Woodside	William Gordon Bennett	Conservative
Gloucester	Moss Turner-Samuels	Labour
Gloucestershire South	Anthony Crosland	Labour
Gloucestershire West	M. Philips Price	Labour
Goole	George Jeger	Labour
Gosport and Fareham	Dr Reginald Bennett	Conservative
Gower	David Grenfell	Labour
Grantham	Joseph Godber	Conservative
Gravesend	Sir Richard Acland	Labour
Greenock	Hector McNeil	Labour
Greenwich	Joseph Reeves	Labour
Grimsby	Kenneth Younger	Labour
Guildford	George Nugent	Conservative
== H ==
Hackney North and Stoke Newington	David Weitzman	Labour
Hackney South	Herbert Butler	Labour
Halifax	Dryden Brook	Labour
Haltemprice	Richard Law	Conservative
Hamilton	Tom Fraser	Labour
Hammersmith North	Frank Tomney	Labour
Hammersmith South	Thomas Williams	Co-op & Labour
Hampstead	Henry Brooke	Conservative
Harborough	John Baldock	Conservative
Harrogate	Christopher York	Conservative
Harrow Central	Patrick Bishop	Conservative
Harrow East	Ian Harvey	Conservative
Harrow West	Sir Albert Braithwaite	Conservative
The Hartlepools	D. T. Jones	Labour
Harwich	Sir Stanley Holmes	National Liberal
Hastings	Neill Cooper-Key	Conservative
Hayes and Harlington	Walter Ayles	Labour
Hemel Hempstead	Frances Davidson	Conservative
Hemsworth	Horace Holmes	Labour
Hendon North	Ian Orr-Ewing	Conservative
Hendon South	Sir Hugh Lucas-Tooth	Conservative
Henley	John Hay	Conservative
Hereford	James Thomas	Conservative
Hertford	Derek Walker-Smith	Conservative
Hertfordshire South-West	Gilbert Longden	Conservative
Heston and Isleworth	Reader Harris	Conservative
Hexham	Rupert Speir	Conservative
Heywood and Royton	Harold Sutcliffe	Conservative
High Peak	Hugh Molson	Conservative
Hitchin	Nigel Fisher	Conservative
Holborn and St Pancras South	Dr Santo Jeger	Labour
Holland-with-Boston	Herbert Butcher	National Liberal & Conservative
Honiton	Cedric Drewe	Conservative
Horncastle	Cmdr John Maitland	Conservative
Hornchurch	Geoffrey Bing	Labour
Hornsey	David Gammans	Conservative
Horsham	Frederick Gough	Conservative
Houghton-le-Spring	Billy Blyton	Labour
Hove	Anthony Marlowe	Conservative
Huddersfield East	Joseph Mallalieu	Labour
Huddersfield West	Donald Wade	Liberal
Huntingdonshire	David Renton	National Liberal & Conservative
Huyton	Harold Wilson	Labour
== I ==
Ilford North	Geoffrey Hutchinson	Conservative
Ilford South	Albert Cooper	Conservative
Ilkeston	George Oliver	Labour
Ince	Tom Brown	Labour
Inverness	Lord Malcolm Douglas-Hamilton	Conservative
Ipswich	Richard Stokes	Labour
Isle of Ely	Maj. Harry Legge-Bourke	Conservative
Isle of Thanet	Hon. Edward Carson	Conservative
Isle of Wight	Sir Peter Macdonald	Conservative
Islington East	Eric Fletcher	Labour
Islington North	Wilfred Fienburgh	Labour
Islington South-West	Albert Evans	Labour
== J ==
Jarrow	Ernest Fernyhough	Labour
== K ==
Keighley	Charles Hobson	Labour
Kensington North	George Rogers	Labour
Kensington South	Sir Patrick Spens	Conservative
Kettering	Gilbert Mitchison	Labour
Kidderminster	Gerald Nabarro	Conservative
Kilmarnock	Willie Ross	Labour
King's Lynn	Cmdr. Ronald Scott-Miller	Conservative
Kingston upon Hull Central	Mark Hewitson	Labour
Kingston upon Hull East	Cmdr. Harry Pursey	Labour
Kingston upon Hull North	Austen Hudson	Conservative
Kingston-upon-Thames	John Boyd-Carpenter	Conservative
Kinross and West Perthshire	William McNair Snadden	Conservative
Kirkcaldy Burghs	Thomas Hubbard	Labour
Knutsford	Lt.-Col. Walter Bromley-Davenport	Conservative
== L ==
Lanark	Patrick Maitland	Conservative
Lanarkshire North	Margaret Herbison	Labour
Lancaster	Brig. Fitzroy Maclean	Conservative
Leeds Central	George Porter	Labour
Leeds North-East	Alice Bacon	Labour
Leeds North	Osbert Peake	Conservative
Leeds North-West	Donald Kaberry	Conservative
Leeds South	Hugh Gaitskell	Labour
Leeds South-East	Maj. James Milner	Labour
Leeds West	Charles Pannell	Labour
Leek	Harold Davies	Labour
Leicester North-East	Lynn Ungoed-Thomas	Labour
Leicester North-West	Barnett Janner	Labour
Leicester South-East	Capt. Charles Waterhouse	Conservative
Leicester South-West	Herbert Bowden	Labour
Leigh	Harold Boardman	Labour
Leominster	Archer Baldwin	Conservative
Lewes	Maj. Tufton Beamish	Conservative
Lewisham North	Sir Austin Hudson, Bt.	Conservative
Lewisham South	Herbert Morrison	Labour
Lewisham West	Henry Price	Conservative
Leyton	Reginald Sorensen	Labour
Lichfield and Tamworth	Julian Snow	Labour
Lincoln	Geoffrey de Freitas	Labour
Liverpool Edge Hill	Arthur Irvine	Labour
Liverpool Exchange	Bessie Braddock	Labour
Liverpool Garston	Victor Raikes	Conservative
Liverpool Kirkdale	William Keenan	Labour
Liverpool Scotland	David Logan	Labour
Liverpool Toxteth	Reginald Bevins	Conservative
Liverpool Walton	Kenneth Thompson	Conservative
Liverpool Wavertree	John Tilney	Conservative
Liverpool West Derby	Sir David Maxwell Fyfe	Conservative
Llanelli	Jim Griffiths	Labour
Londonderry	William Wellwood	Ulster Unionist
Loughborough	Mont Follick	Labour
Louth	Cyril Osborne	Conservative
Lowestoft	Edward Evans	Labour
Ludlow	Christopher Holland-Martin	Conservative
Luton	Dr Charles Hill	Conservative & National Liberal
== M ==
Macclesfield	Air Cdre. Arthur Vere Harvey	Conservative
Maidstone	Alfred Bossom	Conservative
Maldon	Tom Driberg	Labour
Manchester Ardwick	Leslie Lever	Labour
Manchester Blackley	Eric Johnson	Conservative
Manchester Cheetham	Harold Lever	Labour
Manchester Clayton	Harry Thorneycroft	Labour
Manchester Exchange	William Griffiths	Labour
Manchester Gorton	William Oldfield	Labour
Manchester Moss Side	Florence Horsbrugh	Conservative
Manchester Withington	Sir Robert Cary	Conservative
Manchester Wythenshawe	Eveline Hill	Conservative
Mansfield	Bernard Taylor	Labour
Melton	Anthony Nutting	Conservative
Merioneth	Thomas Jones, Baron Maelor	Labour
Merthyr Tydfil	S. O. Davies	Labour
Merton and Morden	Capt. Robert Ryder, VC	Conservative
Middlesbrough East	Hilary Marquand	Labour
Middlesbrough West	Jocelyn Simon	Conservative
Middleton and Prestwich	Sir John Barlow, Bt.	Conservative
Midlothian and Peebles	David Pryde	Labour
Mitcham	Robert Carr	Conservative
Monmouth	Peter Thorneycroft	Conservative
Montgomery	Clement Davies	Liberal
Moray and Nairn	Hon. James Stuart	Conservative
Morecambe and Lonsdale	Sir Ian Fraser	Conservative
Morpeth	Robert Taylor	Labour
Motherwell	Alexander Anderson	Labour
== N ==
Neath	D. J. Williams	Labour
Nelson and Colne	Sydney Silverman	Labour
Newark	George Deer	Labour
Newbury	Anthony Hurd	Conservative
Newcastle-under-Lyme	Stephen Swingler	Labour
Newcastle upon Tyne Central	Edward Short	Labour
Newcastle upon Tyne East	Arthur Blenkinsop	Labour
Newcastle upon Tyne North	Hon. Gwilym Lloyd George	Liberal & Conservative
Newcastle upon Tyne West	Ernest Popplewell	Labour
New Forest	Col. Oliver Crosthwaite-Eyre	Conservative
Newport	Peter Freeman	Labour
Newton	Frederick Lee	Labour
Norfolk Central	Brig. Frank Medlicott	National Liberal & Conservative
Norfolk North	Edwin Gooch	Labour
Norfolk South	Peter Baker	Conservative
Norfolk, South-West	Denys Bullard	Conservative
Normanton	Albert Roberts	Labour
Northampton	Reginald Paget	Labour
Northamptonshire South	Reginald Manningham-Buller	Conservative
Northwich	John Foster	Conservative
Norwich, North	John Paton	Labour
Norwich, South	Henry Strauss	Conservative
Norwood	Brig. John Smyth, VC	Conservative
Nottingham Central	Ian Winterbottom	Labour
Nottingham East	James Harrison	Labour
Nottingham North-West	Tom O'Brien	Labour
Nottingham South	Norman Smith	Co-op & Labour
Nuneaton	Frank Bowles	Labour
== O ==
Ogmore	Walter Padley	Labour
Oldbury and Halesowen	Arthur Moyle	Labour
Oldham East	Ian Horobin	Conservative
Oldham West	Leslie Hale	Labour
Orkney and Shetland	Jo Grimond	Liberal
Ormskirk	Sir Arthur Salter	Conservative
Orpington	Sir Waldron Smithers	Conservative
Oswestry	Hon. David Ormsby-Gore	Conservative
Oxford	Lawrence Turner	Conservative
== P ==
Paddington North	William J. Field	Labour
Paddington South	Robert Allan	Conservative
Paisley	Douglas Johnston	Labour
Peckham	Freda Corbet	Labour
Pembrokeshire	Desmond Donnelly	Labour
Penistone	Henry McGhee	Labour
Penrith and the Border	Robert Scott	Conservative
Perth and East Perthshire	Col. Alan Gomme-Duncan	Conservative
Peterborough	Harmar Nicholls	Conservative
Petersfield	Peter Legh	Conservative
Plymouth Devonport	Michael Foot	Labour
Plymouth Sutton	Jakie Astor	Conservative
Pontefract	George Sylvester	Labour
Pontypool	Granville West	Labour
Pontypridd	Arthur Pearson	Labour
Poole	Richard Pilkington	Conservative
Poplar	Charles Key	Labour
Portsmouth Langstone	Geoffrey Stevens	Conservative
Portsmouth South	Sir Jocelyn Lucas	Conservative
Portsmouth West	Brig. Terence Clarke	Conservative
Preston North	Julian Amery	Conservative
Preston South	Edward Shackleton	Labour
Pudsey	Col. Cyril Banks	Conservative
Putney	Hugh Linstead	Conservative
== R ==
Reading, North	Frederic Bennett	Conservative
Reading, South	Ian Mikardo	Labour
Reigate	John Vaughan-Morgan	Conservative
Renfrewshire, East	Maj. Guy Lloyd	Conservative
Renfrewshire, West	John Maclay	National Liberal & Conservative
Rhondda East	William Mainwaring	Labour
Rhondda West	Iorwerth Thomas	Labour
Richmond (Yorks)	Sir Thomas Dugdale	Conservative
Richmond upon Thames	Sir George Harvie-Watt	Conservative
Ripon	Col. Malcolm Stoddart-Scott	Conservative
Rochdale	Wentworth Schofield	Conservative
Rochester and Chatham	Arthur Bottomley	Labour
Romford	Lt.-Col. John Lockwood	Conservative
Ross and Cromarty	Capt. John MacLeod	Liberal & Conservative
Rossendale	Tony Greenwood	Labour
Rotherham	Jack Jones	Labour
Rother Valley	David Griffiths	Labour
Rowley Regis and Tipton	Arthur Henderson	Labour
Roxburgh and Selkirk	Charles Donaldson	Conservative
Rugby	James Johnson	Labour
Ruislip-Northwood	Petre Crowder	Conservative
Runcorn	Dennis Vosper	Conservative
Rushcliffe	Col. Martin Redmayne	Conservative
Rutherglen	Richard Brooman-White	Conservative
Rutland and Stamford	Roger Conant	Conservative
== S ==
Saffron Walden	Rab Butler	Conservative
St Albans	Hon. John Grimston	Conservative
St Helens	Sir Hartley Shawcross	Labour
St Ives	Hon. Greville Howard	Conservative & Nat. Liberal
St Marylebone	Sir Wavell Wakefield	Conservative
St Pancras North	Kenneth Robinson	Labour
Salford East	Edward Arthur Hardy	Labour
Salford West	Charles Royle	Labour
Salisbury	John Morrison	Conservative
Scarborough and Whitby	Alexander Spearman	Conservative
Sedgefield	Joseph Slater	Labour
Sevenoaks	John Rodgers	Conservative
Sheffield, Attercliffe	John Hynd	Labour
Sheffield, Brightside	Richard Winterbottom	Labour
Sheffield, Hallam	Roland Jennings	Conservative & Liberal
Sheffield, Heeley	Maj. Peter Roberts	Conservative & Liberal
Sheffield, Hillsborough	George Darling	Co-op & Labour
Sheffield, Neepsend	Sir Frank Soskice	Labour
Sheffield, Park	Fred Mulley	Labour
Shipley	Geoffrey Hirst	Conservative
Shoreditch and Finsbury	Ernest Thurtle	Labour
Shrewsbury	John Langford-Holt	Conservative
Skipton	Burnaby Drayson	Conservative
Smethwick	Patrick Gordon-Walker	Labour
Solihull	Martin Lindsay	Conservative
Somerset North	Edwin Leather	Conservative
Southall	George Pargiter	Labour
Southampton, Itchen	Ralph Morley	Labour
Southampton, Test	Horace King	Labour
Southend East	Stephen McAdden	Conservative
Southend West	Henry Channon	Conservative
Southgate	Beverley Baxter	Conservative
Southport	Robert Hudson	Conservative
South Shields	James Chuter Ede	Labour
Southwark	George Isaacs	Labour
Sowerby	Douglas Houghton	Labour
Spelthorne	Beresford Craddock	Conservative
Stafford and Stone	Hon. Hugh Fraser	Conservative
Stalybridge and Hyde	Fred Blackburn	Labour
Stepney	Walter Edwards	Labour
Stirling and Falkirk	Malcolm MacPherson	Labour
Stirlingshire East and Clackmannan	Arthur Woodburn	Labour
Stirlingshire West	Alfred Balfour	Labour
Stockport North	Wg. Cdr. Norman Hulbert	Conservative
Stockport South	Sir Arnold Gridley	Conservative
Stockton-on-Tees	George Chetwynd	Labour
Stoke-on-Trent Central	Dr Barnett Stross	Labour
Stoke-on-Trent North	Albert Davies	Labour
Stoke-on-Trent South	Ellis Smith	Labour
Stratford-on-Avon	John Profumo	Conservative
Streatham	Duncan Sandys	Conservative
Stretford	Samuel Storey	Conservative
Stroud and Thornbury	Walter Perkins	Conservative
Sudbury and Woodbridge	John Hare	Conservative
Sunderland North	Fred Willey	Labour
Sunderland South	Richard Ewart	Labour
Surrey East	Charles Doughty	Conservative
Sutton and Cheam	Sydney Marshall	Conservative
Sutton Coldfield	Sir John Mellor	Conservative
Swansea East	David Mort	Labour
Swansea West	Percy Morris	Labour
Swindon	Thomas Reid	Labour
== T ==
Taunton	Henry Hopkinson	Conservative
Tavistock	Henry Studholme	Conservative
Thirsk and Malton	Robin Turton	Conservative
Thurrock	Hugh Delargy	Labour
Tiverton	Derick Heathcoat-Amory	Conservative
Tonbridge	Gerald Williams	Conservative
Torquay	Charles Williams	Conservative
Torrington	Hon. George Lambert	National Liberal & Conservative
Totnes	Brig. Ralph Rayner	Conservative
Tottenham	Frederick Messer	Co-op & Labour
Truro	Geoffrey Wilson	Conservative
Twickenham	Edward Keeling	Conservative
Tynemouth	Irene Ward	Conservative
== U ==
Ulster Mid	Michael O'Neill	National Party of Northern Ireland
Uxbridge	Frank Beswick	Co-op & Labour
== V ==
Vauxhall	George Strauss	Labour
== W ==
Wakefield	Arthur Greenwood	Labour
Wallasey	Ernest Marples	Conservative
Wallsend	John McKay	Labour
Walsall	William Wells	Labour
Walthamstow East	Harry Wallace	Labour
Walthamstow West	Clement Attlee	Labour
Wandsworth Central	Richard Adams	Labour
Warwick and Leamington	Anthony Eden	Conservative
Warrington	Hyacinth Morgan	Labour
Watford	John Freeman	Labour
Wednesbury	Stanley Evans	Labour
Wellingborough	George Lindgren	Labour
Wells	Lynch Maydon	Conservative
Wembley North	Eric Bullus	Conservative
Wembley South	Ronald Russell	Conservative
West Bromwich	John Dugdale	Labour
Westbury	Robert Grimston	Conservative
Western Isles	Malcolm Macmillan	Labour
West Ham North	Arthur Lewis	Labour
West Ham South	Elwyn Jones	Labour
Westhoughton	Tom Price	Labour
West Lothian	John Taylor	Labour
Westmorland	William Fletcher-Vane	Conservative
Weston-super-Mare	Ian Orr-Ewing	Conservative
Whitehaven	Frank Anderson	Labour
Widnes	James MacColl	Labour
Wigan	Ronald Williams	Labour
Willesden East	Maurice Orbach	Labour
Willesden West	Samuel Viant	Labour
Wimbledon	Cyril Black	Conservative
Winchester	Peter Smithers	Conservative
Windsor	Charles Mott-Radclyffe	Conservative
Wirral	Selwyn Lloyd	Conservative
Woking	Harold Watkinson	Conservative
Wokingham	Peter Remnant	Conservative
Wolverhampton North-East	John Baird	Labour
Wolverhampton South-West	Enoch Powell	Conservative
Woodford	Winston Churchill	Conservative
Wood Green	William Irving	Co-op & Labour
Woolwich East	Christopher Mayhew	Labour
Woolwich West	William Steward	Conservative
Worcester	Hon. George Ward	Conservative
Worcestershire South	Rupert de la Bere	Conservative
Workington	Fred Peart	Labour
Worthing	Brig. Otho Prior-Palmer	Conservative
The Wrekin	Ivor Owen Thomas	Labour
Wrexham	Robert Richards	Labour
Wycombe	William Astor	Conservative
== Y ==
Yarmouth	Anthony Fell	Conservative
Yeovil	John Peyton	Conservative
York	Harry Hylton-Foster	Conservative

° Frank Collindridge, the sitting MP for Barnsley, died during the campaign. A special election took place on 8 November .

== By-elections ==
See the list of United Kingdom by-elections.

== See also ==
- List of parliaments of the United Kingdom
- List of MPs for constituencies in Scotland (1951–1955)
- List of MPs for constituencies in Wales (1951–1955)
- UK general election, 1951
- Category:UK MPs 1951-1955
