= Aberdare by-election =

Aberdare by-election could refer to two by-elections held for the Parliament of the United Kingdom;

- 1946 Aberdare by-election
- 1954 Aberdare by-election
