= Empire Party =

Empire Party may refer to:

- British Empire Party, a defunct political party in the United Kingdom
- Deutsche Reichspartei, a defunct political party in Germany
- Teikokutō, a defunct political party in Japan
