= 1951 United Kingdom general election in Wales =

- 25 October 1951

All 36 Welsh seats to the House of Commons
- Turnout: 84.4% (▼0.4 pp)
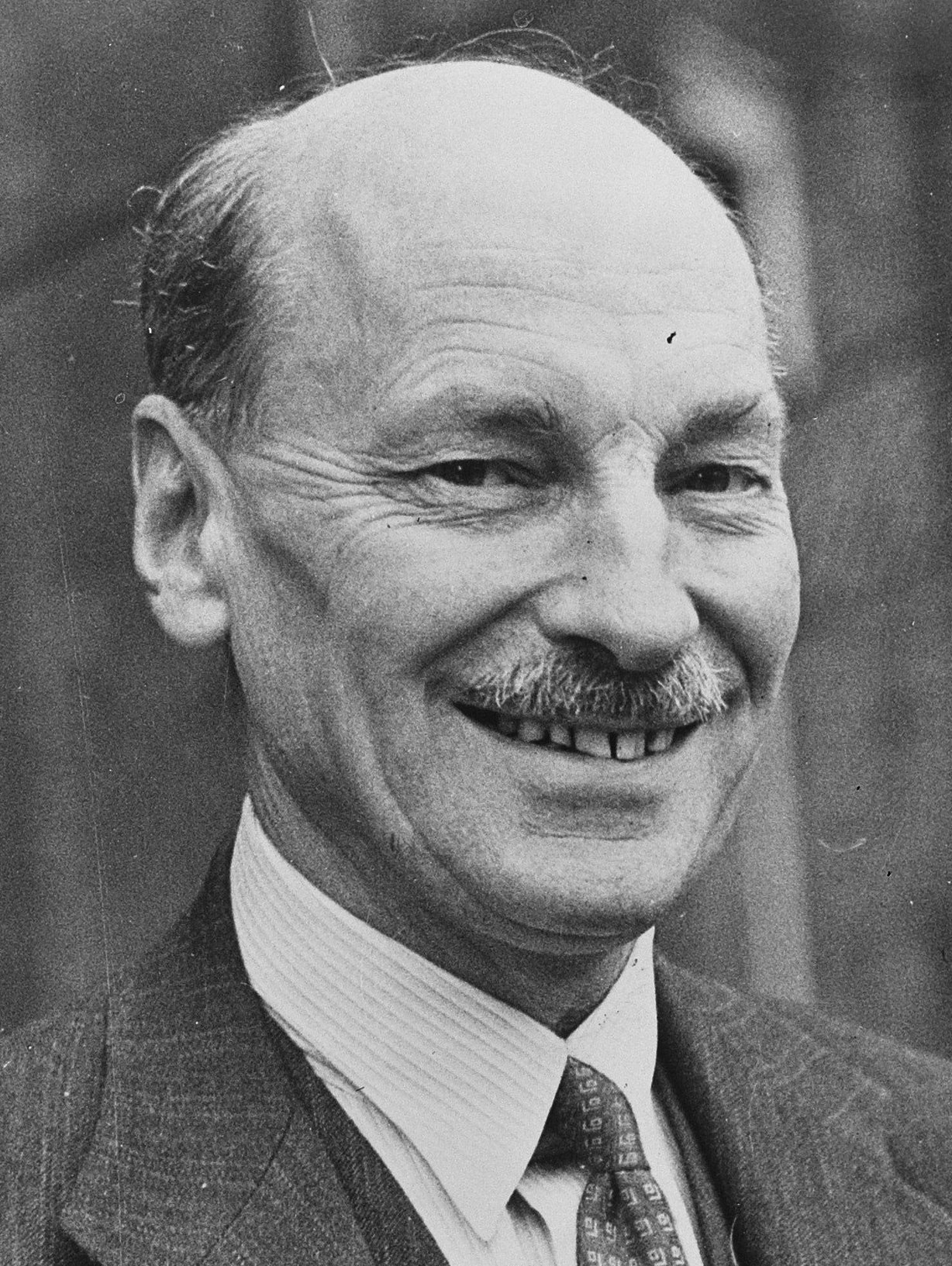

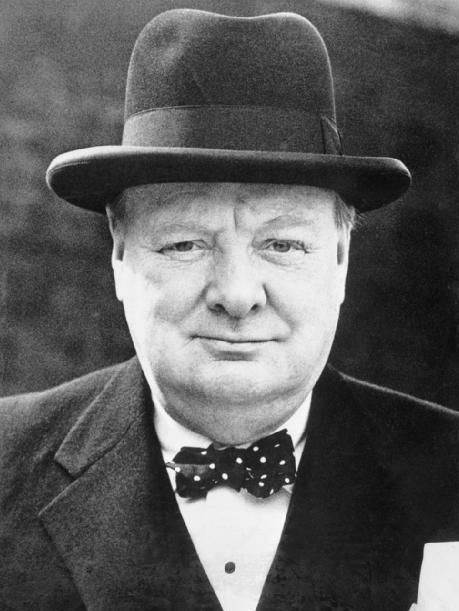

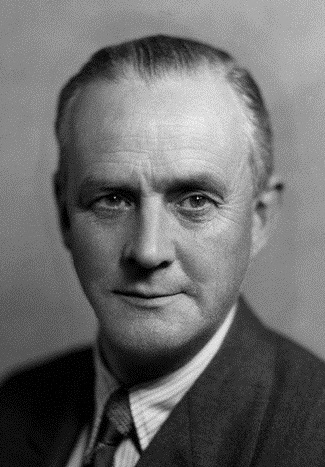
	First party	Second party	Third party
Leader	Clement Attlee	Winston Churchill	Clement Davies
Party	Labour	Conservative	Liberal
Leader since	25 October 1935	9 October 1940	2 August 1945
Leader's seat	Walthamstow West	Woodford	Montgomeryshire
Last election	27 seats, 58.1%	4 seats, 27.4%	5 seats, 12.6%
Seats won	27	6	3
Seat change	Steady	▲2	▼2
Popular vote	925,848	471,269	116,821
Percentage	60.5%	30.8%	7.6%
Swing	▲2.4 pp	▲3.4 pp	▼5.0 pp

On Thursday 25 October 1951, the 1951 United Kingdom general election was held in Wales, to elect all 625 members of the House of Commons, with 36 constituencies being in Wales. The election saw the Labour party win the most votes and seats in Wales, retaining its overall 27 seats.

It was the final general election to be held during the reign of King George VI, as he died the following year on 6 February 1951 and was succeeded by his daughter, Queen Elizabeth II.

The Labour Party gained Anglesey and Merioneth from the Liberal Party. As a result, deputy leader of the Liberal Party Megan Lloyd George, the first female Member of Parliament for Wales, left Parliament after losing Anglesey. Lloyd George would, however, later return to Parliament in Caerfyrddin in the 1957 Carmarthen by-election as a Labour candidate.

At the same time the Conservative party gained Conwy and Barry from the Labour Party. Peter Thomas entered Parliament in Conwy. He would go on to become the Chairman of the Conservative Party and the first Conservative Secretary of State for Wales. Under the constituency agreement with the Conservative Party, the National Liberal Party's sole Member of Parliament, Garner Evans, retained Denbigh.

== Candidates ==
Below is a table summarising the candidates of the 1951 general election in Wales.

Affiliation	Candidates
Labour Party	36
Conservative and Unionist Party	30
Liberal Party	9
Plaid Cymru	4
National Liberal Party	3
Communist Party of Great Britain	1 (Note: Candidate Idris Cox stood in Rhondda East.)
British Empire Party	1 (Note: Candidate Trefor David stood in Ogmore.)
Total	84

== Results ==
Below is a table summarising the results of the 1951 general election in Wales.

Party	Seats					Aggregate votes		
Party	Total	Gains	Losses	Net	Of total (%)	Total	Of total (%)	Change (%)
Labour	27	2	2	Steady	75.0	925,848	60.5	▲2.4
Conservative (Total)	6	2	0	▲2	16.7	471,269	30.8	▲3.4
Conservative	5	2	0	▲2	13.9	421,525	27.6	▲6.6
National Liberal	1	0	0	Steady	2.8	49,744	3.3	▼3.1
Liberal	3	0	2	▼2	8.3	116,821	7.6	▼5.0
Plaid Cymru	0	0	0	Steady	—	10,920	0.7	▼0.5
Communist	0	0	0	Steady	—	2,948	0.2	▼0.4
British Empire	0	New			—	1,643	0.1	New
Total	36			0	100.0	1,529,449	100.0	0.0
Registered voters, and turnout						1,812,664 (Note: Electorate in contested constituencies, which was all seats in this election.)	84.4	▼0.4

Popular vote
Labour	60.5%
Conservative	30.8%
Liberal	7.6%
Plaid Cymru	0.7%
Communist	0.2%
British Empire	0.1%

Parliament seats
Labour	75.0%
Conservative	16.7%
Liberal	8.3%

== See also ==
- 1951 United Kingdom general election in England
- 1951 United Kingdom general election in Scotland
- 1951 United Kingdom general election in Northern Ireland
- List of MPs for constituencies in Wales (1951–1955)
