= George Hall, 1st Viscount Hall =

British Labour politician (1881–1965)

The Right Honourable The Viscount Hall PC
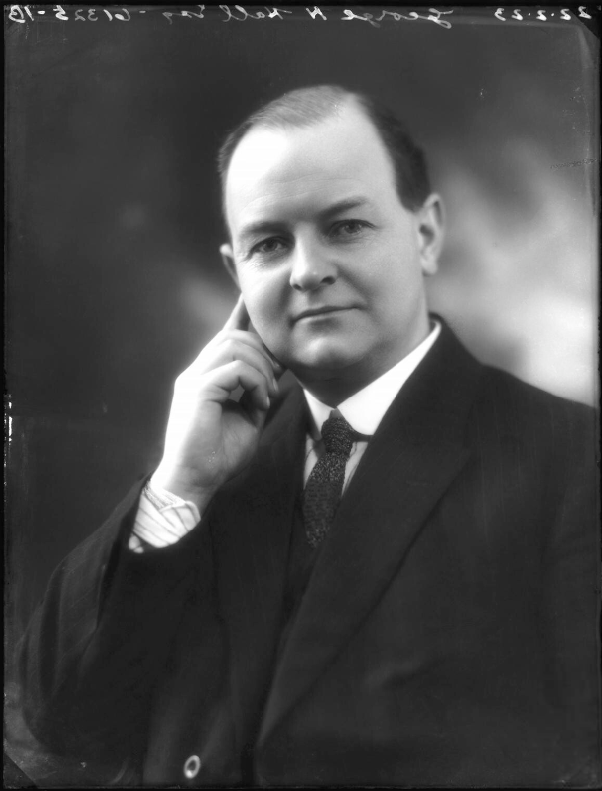

First Lord of the Admiralty
- In office 4 October 1946 – 24 May 1951
- Monarch: George VI
- Prime Minister: Clement Attlee
- Preceded by: A. V. Alexander
- Succeeded by: The Lord Pakenham

Secretary of State for the Colonies
- In office 3 August 1945 – 4 October 1946
- Prime Minister: Clement Attlee
- Preceded by: Hon. Oliver Stanley
- Succeeded by: Arthur Creech Jones

Parliamentary Under-Secretary of State for Foreign Affairs
- In office 25 September 1943 – 26 May 1945
- Prime Minister: Winston Churchill
- Preceded by: Richard Law
- Succeeded by: Alec Douglas-Home; Simon Fraser

Financial Secretary to the Admiralty
- In office 4 February 1942 – 25 September 1943
- Prime Minister: Winston Churchill
- Succeeded by: James Thomas

Parliamentary Under-Secretary of State for the Colonies
- In office 12 May 1940 – 4 February 1942
- Prime Minister: Winston Churchill
- Preceded by: Basil Hamilton-Temple-Blackwood
- Succeeded by: Harold Macmillan

Civil Lord of the Admiralty
- In office 7 June 1929 – 24 August 1931
- Prime Minister: Ramsay MacDonald
- Preceded by: James Stanhope
- Succeeded by: Euan Wallace

Member of the House of Lords Lord Temporal
- In office 28 October 1946 – 8 November 1965; Hereditary Peerage
- Preceded by: Peerage created
- Succeeded by: The 2nd Viscount Hall

Member of Parliament for Aberdare
- In office 15 November 1922 – 4 October 1946
- Preceded by: Charles Stanton
- Succeeded by: David Thomas

Personal details
- Born: 31 December 1881 Penrhiwceiber, Glamorganshire
- Died: 8 November 1965 (aged 83) Leicester, Leicestershire
- Party: Labour

George Henry Hall, 1st Viscount Hall, PC (31 December 1881 – 8 November 1965), was a British Labour Party politician. He served as Secretary of State for the Colonies between 1945 and 1946 and as First Lord of the Admiralty between 1946 and 1951.

== Background ==
Hall was born in Penrhiwceiber, Glamorganshire, son of George Hall, a miner who was from Marshfield, Gloucestershire and his wife Anne (née Guard), a native of Midsomer Norton, Somerset. Hall was the second of six children (four sons and two daughters) born between 1880 and 1889. His parents were among the thousands of people who migrated to the South Wales Valleys from the West Country in the late nineteenth century, following the expansion of the steam coal trade. George Hall snr. died in 1889 and the young George was compelled to leave Penrhiwceiber elementary school at the age of twelve, in order to start work at the Penrhiwceiber colliery. His widowed mother had been left with a large family to support.

== Early career ==
Following an accident at the colliery requiring a prolonged period of recovery, Hall replaced his relative lack of formal education with extensive reading and self-education. This may well have been a factor in his becoming involved in politics. He was elected as a Labour member of the Mountain Ash Urban District Council (the first Labour member for the Penrhiwceiber Ward) in 1908. On his election, when he defeated sitting Liberal member J.P. Davies by 31 votes, the Aberdare Leader described him as "a young man with very sturdy views. He is bent on backing up Labour principles, and with all his life before him looks like shaping into a leader to be dealt with in that party."

Hall later chaired both the Education Committee and the Urban Council itself and he remained a member until 1926. Hall continued to work as a collier until appointed checkweigher in 1911, and then to act as checkweigher Local Agent at the South Wales Miners' Federation until elected to Parliament in 1922.

== Political career ==
Hall was elected Member of Parliament (MP) for Aberdare at the 1922 general election when he gained the seat for Labour, defeating Charles Stanton who on this occasion stood at the election as a National Liberal having held the seat since a 1915 by-election. Stanton had been a militant trade unionist before the war and had won the seat as a pro-war candidate.

Hall represented Aberdare from 1922 to 1946 and served under Ramsay MacDonald as Civil Lord of the Admiralty from 1929 to 1931. During the 1930s, with the Labour Party numbers in the Commons severely depleted after the 1931 General Election, Hall began to speak on a broader range of subjects having previously focused mainly on issues relating to his mining background.

== Constituency MP ==
During his long political career, Hall remained closely tied to his native town and valley and was regarded as an effective and approachable constituency MP. He devoted considerable energy to attract alternative industries to the Aberdare area following the decline of coal mining. It was largely through his efforts that a major new employer, Aberdare Cables, established a factory in the town in 1937 and Hall later became a director of the company. He was instrumental in establishing Royal Ordnance Factories at Robertstown and Rhigos during World War II as well as the new Hirwaun Trading Estate in 1945. These developments, at least to some extent, offset the impact of the closure of coal mines from the 1930s onwards.

== Wartime Government and Cabinet Minister ==
Hall served under Winston Churchill as Under-Secretary of State for the Colonies from 1940 to 1942, as Financial Secretary to the Admiralty from 1942 to 1943, and as Parliamentary Under-Secretary of State for Foreign Affairs from 1943 to 1945 and under Clement Attlee as Secretary of State for the Colonies from 1945 to 1946.

He was appointed a Privy Counsellor in 1942, and on retirement from the House of Commons in 1946, he was raised to the peerage as Viscount Hall, of Cynon Valley in the County of Glamorgan, He then served as First Lord of the Admiralty under Attlee from 1946 to 1951 and as Deputy Leader of the House of Lords from 1947 to 1951.

== Personal life ==
He married Margaret Jones from Ynysybwl on 12 October 1910. They had two sons, one who inherited his father's title while the other was killed while serving in the Royal Navy during World War II. She died on 24 July 1941. Towards the end of his life, he married Alice Martha Walker from Brinklow, a member of Leicestershire County Council, in 1964.

He was a member of the Church in Wales and was elected to its Representative Body

Lord Hall died in Leicester in November 1965, aged 83, and was succeeded by his son William.

== Arms ==
Coat of arms of George Hall, 1st Viscount Hall

Crest
A demi-talbot lozengy Argent and Sable supporting between the paws a leek Proper.
Escutcheon
Lozengy Argent and Sable on a pile reversed Azure between in chief two talbots' heads erased an anchor fouled Or.
Supporters
Dexter a pegasus left a griffin Azure winged Or.
Motto
Veritas Et Robur (Truth And Strength)
Badge
Within a reef knot Azure a talbot's head erased Or.

== Sources ==
=== Online sources ===
- Morgan, Walter Thomas. "George Henry Hall, (1881–1965), first Viscount Hall of Cynon Valley (created 1946), politician". Dictionary of Welsh Biography. National Library of Wales.

== Other sources ==
- Leigh Rayment's Peerage Pages
- Leigh Rayment's Historical List of MPs

Parliament of the United Kingdom
Preceded by Charles Stanton	Member of Parliament for Aberdare; 1922–1946	Succeeded by David Thomas
Political offices
Preceded by The Earl Stanhope	Civil Lord of the Admiralty; 1929–1931	Succeeded by Euan Wallace
Preceded by The Marquess of Dufferin and Ava	Under-Secretary of State for the Colonies; 1940–1942	Succeeded by Harold Macmillan
Preceded by Richard Law	Parliamentary Under-Secretary of State for Foreign Affairs; 1943–1945	Succeeded by Lord Dunglass; The Lord Lovat
Preceded by Hon. Oliver Stanley	Secretary of State for the Colonies; 1945–1946	Succeeded by Arthur Creech Jones
Preceded by A. V. Alexander	First Lord of the Admiralty; 1946–1951	Succeeded by The Lord Pakenham
Peerage of the United Kingdom
New creation	Viscount Hall; 1946–1965	Succeeded by William Hall
