= William Hall, 2nd Viscount Hall =

Welsh surgeon and businessman (1913–1985)

The Right Honourable The Viscount Hall

Chairman of the Post Office
- In office 1 October 1969 – 19 June 1970
- Preceded by: John Stonehouse

Member of the House of Lords Lord Temporal
- In office 8 November 1965 – 24 July 1985; Hereditary Peerage
- Preceded by: The 1st Viscount Hall
- Succeeded by: Peerage extinct

Personal details
- Born: 9 March 1913
- Died: 24 July 1985 (aged 72)
- Party: Labour

William George Leonard Hall, 2nd Viscount Hall (9 March 1913 – 24 July 1985), was a Welsh surgeon and businessman who was the first chairman of the Post Office.

He was the son of George Hall, a mineworker who became a Labour Party member of parliament and cabinet minister. Hall won a scholarship to Christ College, Brecon, but left school to become a miner at the age of 15. He subsequently joined the Merchant Navy. He soon re-entered education, receiving medical training at University College Hospital and becoming a Member of the Royal College of Surgeons and Licentiate of the Royal College of Physicians.

In 1938 he was appointed assistant medical officer for Merthyr Tydfil. He gave up the post in 1940, during the Second World War, becoming a Surgeon Lieutenant-Commander in the Royal Navy Volunteer Reserve.

In 1946 he returned to civilian life, as a medical officer for the Powell Duffryn Group, a South Wales-based operator of coalmines (until 1947) and seaports. He quickly moved from a medical position to become a director. He later held a post as director of investments for Africa, Asia and the Middle East for the International Finance Corporation.

His father was created Viscount Hall of Cynon Valley in 1946, and he inherited the title in 1965.

In 1969 he was appointed the first chairman of the Post Office, a new statutory corporation that took over the duties of the General Post Office. His tenure was to be short, however. He had been appointed by John Stonehouse, Post-Master General in the Labour Party government of Harold Wilson. When the Conservative Party won the 1970 general election, Christopher Chataway, the new Minister for Posts and Telecommunications, dismissed him from his post. The decision was controversial, with a number of sympathy strikes by postal unions causing disruption to postal services.

Hall re-entered private business as a director in a number of companies and was also an active member of the House of Lords.

He married three times: to Joan Margaret Griffiths (died 1962) in 1938, to Constance Anne Garthorne Hardy (died 1972) in 1963, and to Marie-Colette Bach in 1975. He had no male heirs, and the title became extinct on his death.

== Arms ==
Coat of arms of William Hall, 2nd Viscount Hall

Crest
A demi-talbot lozengy Argent and Sable supporting between the paws a leek Proper.
Escutcheon
Lozengy Argent and Sable on a pile reversed Azure between in chief two talbots' heads erased an anchor fouled Or.
Supporters
Dexter a pegasus left a griffin Azure winged Or.
Motto
Veritas Et Robur (Truth And Strength)
Badge
Within a reef knot Azure a talbot's head erased Or.

Peerage of the United Kingdom
Preceded by George Hall	Viscount Hall; 1965–1985	Extinct
