= Opinion polling for the 1951 United Kingdom general election =

In the run-up to the United Kingdom general elections, various organisations carry out opinion polling to gauge voting intention. Results of such polls are displayed in this article.

The date range for these opinion polls are from the general election until the general election.

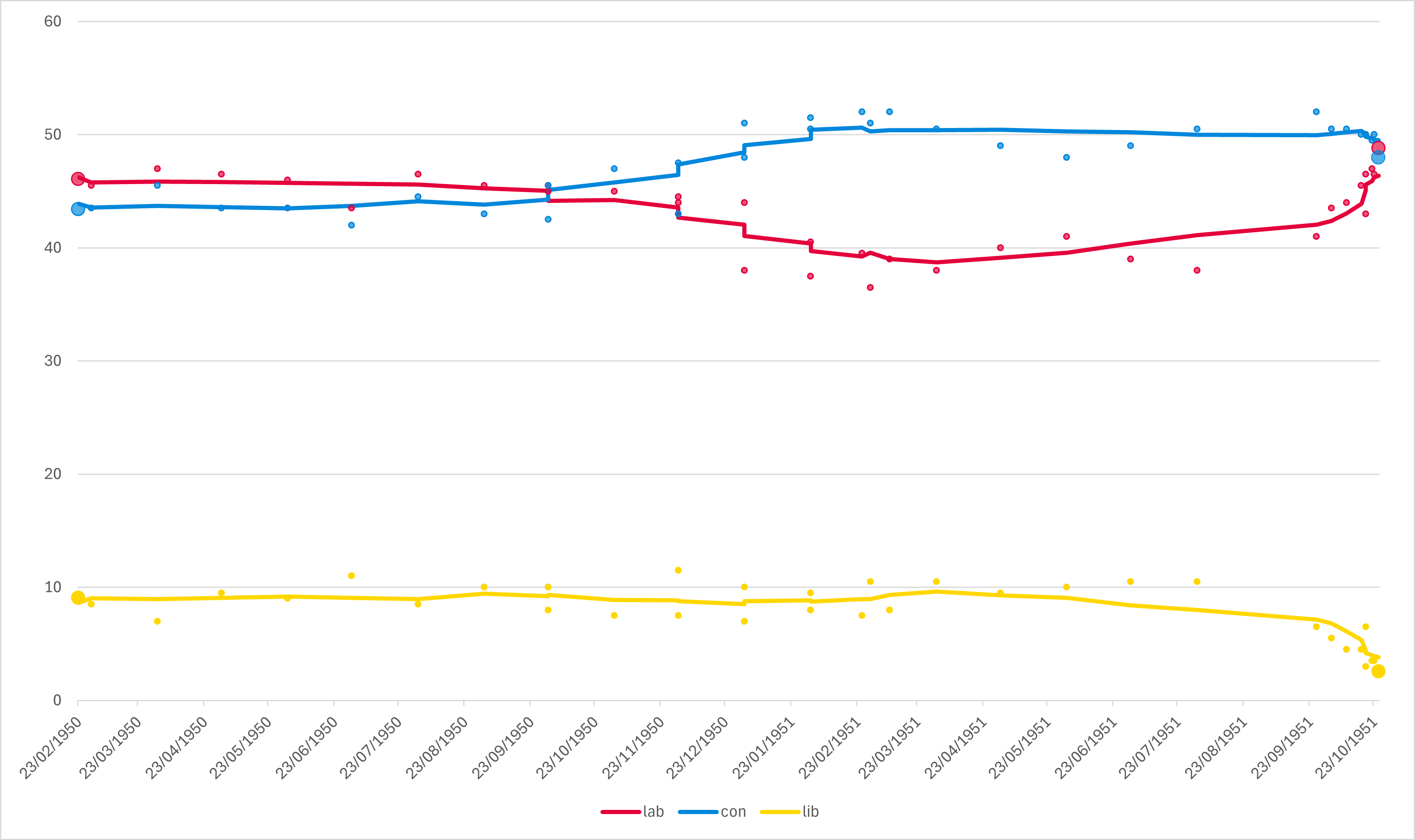
UK opinion polling for the election with an 8-poll moving average

== Polling results ==
All data is from PollBase

=== 1951 ===
Date(s) conducted/ published	Pollster	Client	Lab	Con	Lib	Lead
25 Oct	1951 general election		48.8%	48%	2.6%	0.8%
22 Oct	Gallup	News Chronicle	47%	49.5%	3.5%	2.5%
19–23 Oct	Daily Express		46.5%	50%	3.5%	3.5%
19 Oct	Research Service Ltd	Daily Graphic	43%	50%	6.5%	7%
19 Oct	Gallup	News Chronicle	46.5%	50%	3%	3.5%
17 Oct	Gallup	News Chronicle	45.5%	50%	4.5%	4.5%
10 Oct	Gallup	News Chronicle	44%	50.5%	4.5%	6.5%
3 Oct	Gallup	News Chronicle	43.5%	50.5%	5.5%	7%
26 Sep	Gallup	News Chronicle	41%	52%	6.5%	11%
Aug	Gallup	News Chronicle	38%	50.5%	10.5%	12.5%
Jul	Gallup	News Chronicle	39%	49%	10.5%	10%
Jun	Gallup	News Chronicle	41%	48%	10%	7%
May	Gallup	News Chronicle	40%	49%	9.5%	9%
Apr	Gallup	News Chronicle	38.5%	50.5%	9%	12%
3–10 Mar	Daily Express		39%	52%	8%	13%
Mar	Gallup	News Chronicle	36.5%	51%	10.5%	14.5%
17–25 Feb	Daily Express		39.5%	52%	7.5%	12.5%
Feb	Gallup	News Chronicle	37.5%	51.5%	9.5%	14%
Feb	Daily Express		40.5%	50.5%	8%	10%
Jan	Daily Express		44%	48%	7%	4%
Jan	Gallup	News Chronicle	38%	51%	10%	13%

=== 1950 ===
Date(s) published	Pollster	Client	Lab	Con	Lib	Lead
Dec	Daily Express		44.5%	47.5%	7.5%	3%
Dec	Gallup	News Chronicle	44%	43%	11.5%	1%
Nov	Daily Express		45%	47%	7.5%	2%
Oct	Daily Express		45.5%	45.5%	8%	Tie
Oct	Gallup	News Chronicle	45%	42.5%	10%	2.5%
Sep	Gallup	News Chronicle	45.5%	43%	10%	2.5%
Aug	Gallup	News Chronicle	46.5%	44.5%	8.5%	2%
Jul	Gallup	News Chronicle	43.5%	42%	11%	1.5%
Jun	Gallup	News Chronicle	46%	43.5%	9%	2.5%
May	Gallup	News Chronicle	46.5%	43.5%	9.5%	3%
Apr	Gallup	News Chronicle	47%	45.5%	7%	1.5%
Mar	Gallup	News Chronicle	45.5%	43.5%	8.5%	2%
23 Feb	1950 general election		46.1%	43.4%	9.1%	2.7%
