= 1951 United Kingdom general election in Scotland =

- 25 October 1951

All 71 Scottish seats to the House of Commons
- Turnout: 81.2% (▲0.3 pp)
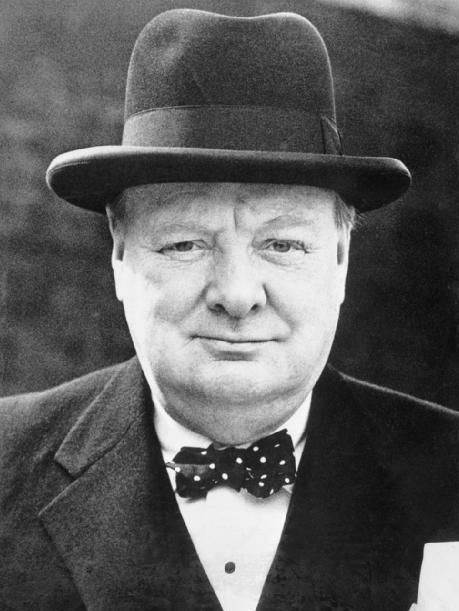

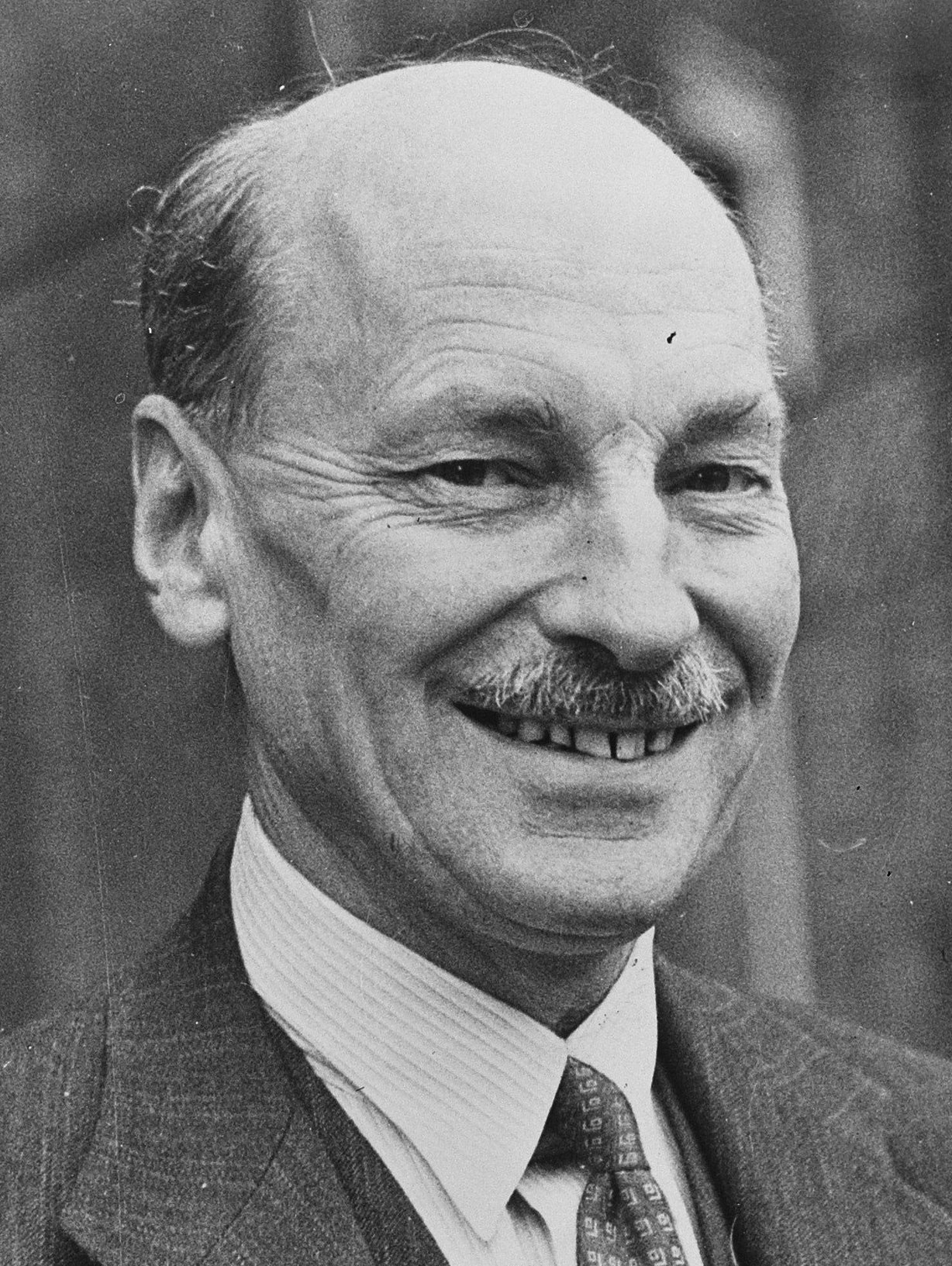

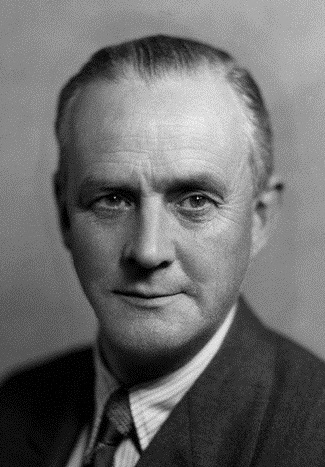
	First party	Second party	Third party
Leader	Winston Churchill	Clement Attlee	Clement Davies
Party	Unionist	Labour	Liberal
Alliance	Conservative		Liberal
Leader since	9 October 1940	25 October 1935	2 August 1945
Leader's seat	Woodford	Walthamstow West	Montgomeryshire
Last election	31 seats, 44.8%	37 seats, 46.2%	2 seats, 6.6%
Seats won	35 (Note: The seat and vote count figures for the Unionists given here include the National Liberals.)	35	1
Seat change	▲4	▼2	▼1
Popular vote	1,349,298	1,330,244	76,291
Percentage	48.6%	47.9%	2.7%
Swing	▲3.8 pp	▲1.7 pp	▼3.9 pp

On Thursday 25 October 1951, the 1951 United Kingdom general election was held in Scotland, to elect all 625 seats of the House of Commons, with 71 constituencies being in Scotland.

It was the final general election to be held during the reign of King George VI, as he died the following year on 6 February 1951 and was succeeded by his daughter, Queen Elizabeth II.

== Candidates ==
Below is a table summarising the candidates of the 1951 general election in Scotland.

Affiliation	Candidates
Labour Party	71
Unionist Party	57
National Liberal Party	13
Liberal Party	9
Communist Party of Great Britain	4
Scottish National Party	2
Independent Labour Party	2 (Note: The candidates that stood were Robert Duncan in Glasgow Bridgeton and James W. Graham in Glasgow Shettleston.)
Independent	1 (Note: Candidate A. E. Pickard stood in Glasgow Maryhill.)
United Socialist Movement	1 (Note: Founder and Leader of the United Socialist Movement Guy Aldred stood in Glasgow Central.)
Total	160

== Analysis ==
The Unionists, together with their allies the National Liberals, ended up narrowly ahead of the Labour Party in terms of vote share, however the two were equal in terms of seats won, each taking 35 seats. When combined with results from across the UK, the Conservatives (with whom the Unionists sat at Westminster) won a majority of 17 seats, despite winning slightly fewer votes than Labour. The election is noteworthy for being, as of 2024, the last election in which the Conservatives did better in Scotland than in England. It is also the most recent election where no party won a majority of Scottish seats.

In terms of seat changes for the Unionist Party and National Liberal Party, the Unionist won Berwick and East Lothian and Rutherglen from Labour and Roxburgh and Selkirk from the Liberal Party. The National Liberal Party retained its seats of Dumfriesshire, East Fife, South Angus, North Angus and Mearns and West Renfrewshire.

John MacLeod in Ross and Cromarty, who had held the seat previously as an Independent Liberal, took up the Whip of the National Liberals and Conservative and Unionist Party at Westminster, under which the National Liberals and Unionist Party held a national affiliation. Thus, his seat was a National Liberal gain compared to the last election.

As a consequence, The Unionists and National Liberals increased overall by four seats, with Labour being reduced by two.

The Liberals were reduced to one Scottish seat, with the loss of Roxburgh and Selkirk. Jo Grimond retained the Liberal's sole seat of Orkney and Shetland.

== Results ==
Party	Seats					Aggregate votes		
Party	Total	Gains	Losses	Net	Of total (%)	Total	Of total (%)	Change (%)
Unionist (Total)	35	4	0	▲4	49.3	1,349,298	48.6	▲3.8
Unionist	29	3	0	▲3	40.8	1,108,321	39.9	▲2.7
National Liberal	6	1 (Note: John MacLeod had fought the 1950 election as an Independent Liberal, but switched to being an official "Liberal and Conservative" (taking the Conservative whip at Westminster) for the 1951 election. His seat, Ross and Cromarty is thus shown as National Liberal gain.)	0	▲1	8.6	240,977	8.7	▲1.1
Labour Party	35	0	2	▼2	49.3	1,330,244	47.9	▲1.7
Liberal	1	0	1	▼1	1.4	76,291	2.7	▼3.9
Communist	0	0	0	Steady	—	10,947	0.4	▼0.6
SNP	0	0	0	Steady	—	7,299	0.3	▼0.1
Independent Labour Party	0	0	0	Steady	—	2,991	0.1	Steady
United Socialist Movement	0	0	0	Steady	—	411	0.0	Steady
Independent	0	0	0	Steady	—	356	0.3	Steady
Other non-contested	0	—N/a		▼1	—	0	0.0	—N/a
Total	71			0	100.0	2,777,837	100.0	0.0
Registered voters, and turnout						3,421,419 (Note: Electorate in contested constituencies, which was all seats in this election.)	81.2	▲0.3

Popular vote
Unionist	48.6%
Labour	47.9%
Liberal	2.8%
Other	0.8%

Parliamentary seats
Unionist	49.30%
Labour	49.30%
Liberal	1.41%

== See also ==
- 1951 United Kingdom general election in England
- 1951 United Kingdom general election in Wales
- 1951 United Kingdom general election in Northern Ireland
- List of MPs for constituencies in Scotland (1951–1955)
