= 1951 Swiss referendums =

Four referendums were held in Switzerland during 1951. The first was held on 25 February on a federal resolution on transport, and was rejected by voters. The second was held on 15 April on a popular initiative to ensure purchasing power and full employment, together with a counterproposal. The counterproposal was approved by 69% of voters, whilst the original proposal was rejected by 88% of voters. The fourth referendum was held on 8 July on forcing public enterprises to make a financial contribution to the national defence budget, and was also rejected by voters.

== Results ==
=== February: Federal resolution on transport ===
Choice	Votes	%
For	318,232	44.3
Against	399,814	55.7
Blank votes	18,402	–
Invalid votes	1,586	–
Total	738,034	100
Registered voters/turnout	1,408,346	52.4
Source: Nohlen & Stöver

=== April: Full employment initiative ===
==== Proposal ====
Choice	Popular vote		Cantons		
Choice	Votes	%	Full	Half	Total
For	88,486	12.28	0	0	0
Against	622,284	86.36	19	6	22
No answer	9,759	1.35	–	–	–
Blank votes	21,676	–	–	–	–
Invalid votes	5,399	–	–	–	–
Total	747,604	100	19	6	22
Registered voters/turnout	1,408,275	43.09	–	–	–
Source: Direct Democracy

==== Counter-proposal ====
Choice	Popular vote		Cantons		
Choice	Votes	%	Full	Half	Total
For	490,326	68.05	19	6	22
Against	209,663	29.10	0	0	0
No answer	20,540	2.85	–	–	–
Blank votes	21,676	–	–	–	–
Invalid votes	5,399	–	–	–	–
Total	747,604	100	19	6	22
Registered voters/turnout	1,408,275	43.09	–	–	–
Source: Direct Democracy

=== July: Defence contributions ===
Choice	Votes	%
For	165,713	32.6
Against	341,869	67.4
Blank votes	20,836	–
Invalid votes	1,080	–
Total	529,498	100
Registered voters/turnout	1,409,091	37.6
Source: Nohlen & Stöver
