= Arthur Probert =

British politician (1907–1975)

Arthur Reginald Probert (30 September 1907 – 14 February 1975) was a British politician. He served as a Labour Member of Parliament (MP) from 1954 to 1974.

Probert, born in Aberdare, was the son of Albert John Probert, born in Bury Hill, Herefordshire and Margaret Probert, born in Aberaman, Aberdare. He was educated at Aberdare Grammar School, before becoming a local government officer. During World War II, he served with the Royal Air Force Volunteer Reserve.

After the war, Probert joined the Labour Party, and from 1949 to 1954 was the secretary of the Aberdare Trades and Labour Council. From 1951, he was additionally secretary of the Glamorgan Federation of Trades Councils.

Probert was first elected as an MP to the Commons at the 1954 Aberdare by-election, following the death of Labour MP David Emlyn Thomas. He was a whip from 1959 to 1960, and Parliamentary Private Secretary to Frank Cousins from 1965 to 1966. He then served on the Speaker's Panel of chairmen. He held his seat until he retired at the February 1974 general election, and died at home in Abernant in 1975 aged 67.

Parliament of the United Kingdom
Preceded by David Thomas	Member of Parliament for Aberdare; 1954 – Feb 1974	Succeeded by Ioan Evans
