= Viscount Hall =

Title in the Peerage of the United Kingdom

Viscount Hall, of Cynon Valley in the County of Glamorgan, was a title in the Peerage of the United Kingdom. It was created on 28 October 1946 for the Labour politician George Hall.

The title became extinct upon the death of his son, the second Viscount, in 1985. He had married pioneering Leicestershire businesswoman Alice Walker in 1962.

== Viscounts Hall (1946) ==
- George Hall, 1st Viscount Hall (1881–1965)
- William Hall, 2nd Viscount Hall (1913–1985)

== Arms ==
Coat of arms of Viscount Hall

Crest
A demi-talbot lozengy Argent and Sable supporting between the paws a leek Proper.
Escutcheon
Lozengy Argent and Sable on a pile reversed Azure between in chief two talbots' heads erased an anchor fouled Or.
Supporters
Dexter a pegasus left a griffin Azure winged Or.
Motto
Veritas Et Robur (Truth And Strength)
Badge
Within a reef knot Azure a talbot's head erased Or.
