= 1946 Aberdare by-election =

UK parliamentary by-election

The 1946 Aberdare by-election was a parliamentary by-election held on 5 December 1946 for the British House of Commons constituency of Aberdare in Wales. The seat had become vacant when the Labour Member of Parliament (MP) George Hall had been created Viscount Hall on 28 October 1946. Hall had held the seat since the 1922 general election. The Labour candidate, David Thomas, held the seat for the party. He remained the constituency's MP until his death in 1954, when a further by-election was held.

The 1946 by-election was the best performance at the time by Plaid Cymru in the industrial valleys of South Wales.

== Result ==
1946 Aberdare by-election
Party	Candidate	Votes	%	±%
Labour	David Thomas	24,215	68.3	−15.9
Plaid Cymru	Wynne Samuel	7,090	20.0	New
Conservative	L. Hallinan	4,140	11.7	−4.0
Majority		17,125	48.3	−20.2
Turnout		35,445	65.7	−10.5
Registered electors		53,911		
Labour hold		Swing		
