= 1951 United Kingdom general election in Northern Ireland =

- 25 October 1951

All 12 Northern Ireland seats in the House of Commons
- Turnout: 79.9% (▲2.5 pp)
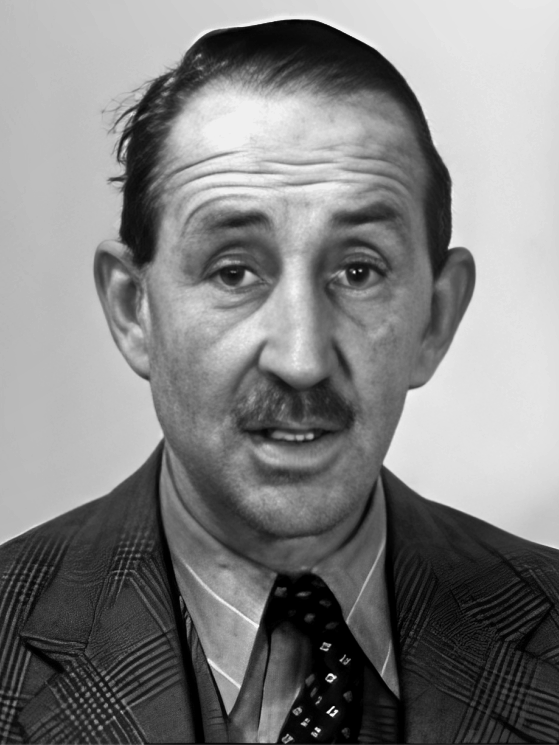

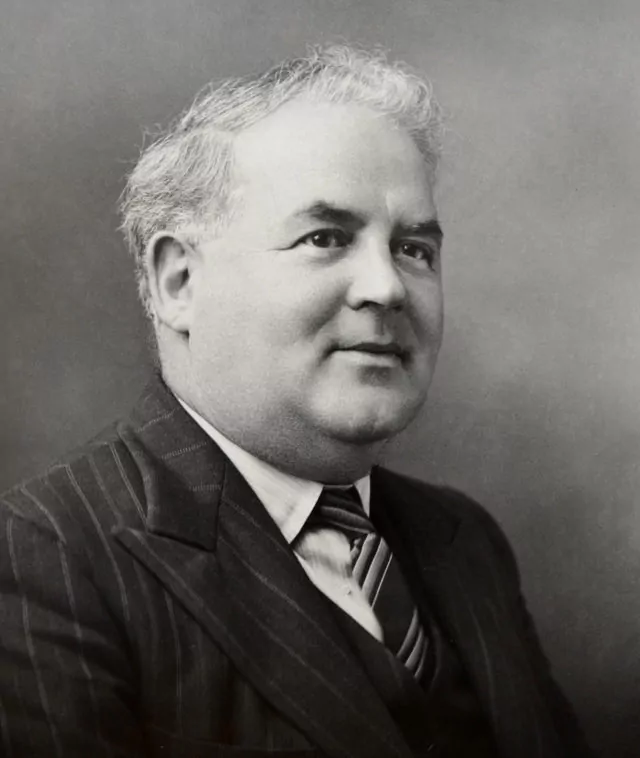
	First party	Second party	Third party
			Nat
Leader	Sir Basil Brooke, Bt	William Norton	James McSparran
Party	UUP	Irish Labour	Nationalist
Alliance	Conservative
Leader since	1943	1932	1945
Leader's seat	Sat in Stormont	Sat in Dáil Éireann	Sat in Stormont
Last election	10 seats, 62.8%	0 seats, 9.4%	2 seats, 11.6%
Seats won	9 (Note: Includes 4 members elected unopposed.)	1	1
Seat change	▼1	▲1	▼1
Popular vote	274,928 (Note: Voting took place in 8 of 12 seats. The other MPs were unopposed.)	33,174	32,714
Percentage	59.4%	7.2%	7.1%
Swing	▼3.4 pp	▼2.2 pp	▼4.5 pp

On 25 October 1951, the 1951 United Kingdom general election was held in Northern Ireland, to elect all 625 members of the House of Commons, including the 12 Northern Ireland seats in single-seat constituencies using first-past-the-post.

The Ulster Unionists lost one seat to Jack Beattie, formerly an Independent Labour MP but now standing for the Irish Labour Party. Four Ulster Unionist candidates were returned unopposed, the last UK general election in which any candidates were so returned. The Nationalists also lost one seat to retirement. It was gained by Michael O'Neill, an independent Nationalist.

In the election as a whole, the Labour Party government led by Clement Attlee, which had won with a narrow majority in the previous election, lost out to the Conservative Party, which included the Ulster Unionists, led by Sir Winston Churchill, who returned as Prime Minister.

== Candidates ==
Affiliation	Candidates
Ulster Unionist Party	12
Northern Ireland Labour Party	4
Irish Labour	1
Independent Nationalist	1
Nationalist	1
Independent Republican	1
Total	20

== Results ==
Party	Seats					Aggregate votes		
Party	Total	Gains	Losses	Net	Of all (%)	Total	Of all (%)	Change (%)
UUP	9	0	1	▼1	75.0	274,928	59.4	▼3.4
NI Labour	0	0	0	Steady	—	62,324	13.5	▲1.4
Labour	1	1	0	▲1	8.3	33,174	7.2	▼2.2
Ind. Nationalist	1	Did not stand in 1950		▲1	8.3	33,097	7.2	—N/a
Nationalist	1	0	1	▼1	8.3	32,714	7.1	▼4.5
Ind. Republican	0	Did not stand in 1950			—	26,976	5.8	—N/a
Total	12			0	100.0	463,213	100.0	0.0
Registered voters, and turnout						579,634 (Note: Electorate in contested constituencies. The total electorate was 871,905.)	79.9	▲2.5

Popular vote
UUP	59.4%
NI Labour	13.5%
Irish Labour	7.2%
Ind. Nationalist	7.2%
National	7.1%
Ind. Republican	5.8%

Parliamentary seats
UUP	75.0%
Irish Labour	8.3%
Ind. Nationalist	8.3%
National	8.3%

== MPs elected ==
Constituency	Party	MP
Antrim North	Ulster Unionist	Hugh O'Neill
Antrim South	Ulster Unionist	Douglas Savory
Armagh	Ulster Unionist	Richard Harden
Belfast East	Ulster Unionist	Alan McKibbin
Belfast North	Ulster Unionist	H. Montgomery Hyde
Belfast South	Ulster Unionist	Conolly Gage
Belfast West	Irish Labour	Jack Beattie
Down North	Ulster Unionist	Walter Smiles
Down South	Ulster Unionist	Lawrence Orr
Fermanagh and South Tyrone	Nationalist	Cahir Healy
Londonderry	Ulster Unionist	William Wellwood
Ulster Mid	Ind. Nationalist	Michael O'Neill

== See also ==
- 1951 United Kingdom general election in England
- 1951 United Kingdom general election in Scotland
- 1951 United Kingdom general election in Wales
