= Aberdare (UK Parliament constituency) =

UK Parliament constituency (1918–1983)

- Former borough constituency for the House of Commons

1918–1983
- Seats: One
- Created from: Merthyr Tydfil
- Replaced by: Cynon Valley

Aberdare was a constituency in the Parliament of the United Kingdom. It was created for the 1918 general election and returned one Member of Parliament (MP) by the first past the post system until it was abolished for the 1983 general election. The Labour Party gained the seat in 1922 and held it comfortably until its abolition.

== Boundaries and name ==
The constituency consisted of the two neighbouring towns of Aberdare and Mountain Ash in Glamorgan, Wales. When the seat was abolished in 1983, it was largely replaced by the Cynon Valley seat.

=== 1918–1950 ===
Under the Representation of the People Act 1918, the existing parliamentary borough of Merthyr Tydfil was divided into two single-member constituencies. One of these was Merthyr Tydfil, Aberdare Division, which consisted of the two urban districts of Aberdare and Mountain Ash.

=== 1950–1983 ===
The Representation of the People Act 1948 reorganised constituencies throughout the United Kingdom, and introduced the term "borough constituency" in place of "parliamentary borough". The duly renamed Aberdare Borough Constituency was again defined as consisting of the Aberdare and Mountain Ash urban districts. The renamed constituency was first contested at the 1950 general election. It was unchanged at the next revision of constituencies in 1970, continuing with the same name and boundaries until its abolition in 1983.

== Members of Parliament ==
Election	Member	Party
1918	Charles Stanton	NDP
1922	George Hall	Labour
1946 by-election	David Thomas	Labour
1954 by-election	Arthur Probert	Labour
Feb 1974	Ioan Evans	Labour Co-operative
1983	constituency abolished: see Cynon Valley	

== History ==
The first member for Aberdare was Charles Stanton, Stanton was a militant miners' agent in the pre-1914 era but had become an equally fierce proponent of the war effort which brought him into conflict with former colleagues including Keir Hardie. Stanton was elected to succeed Hardie as member for Merthyr Boroughs at a by-election in 1915 and comfortably won the Aberdare constituency at the 1918 Coupon Election.

By 1922, Stanton's appeal and popularity had faded and he was defeated by George Hall, who held the seat for over twenty years.

Labour's hold on Aberdare was never threatened thereafter although Plaid Cymru did make a strong showing at the 1970 general election. Glyn Owen, the new Plaid Cymru candidate in 1974, sustained the campaign from 1970 but this did not seriously threaten the new Labour candidate, Ioan Evans, at the second election that year.

== Elections ==
=== Elections in the 1910s ===
December 1918 general election: Aberdare
Party		Candidate	Votes	%
C	National Democratic	Charles Stanton	22,824	78.6
	Labour	T. E. Nicholas	6,229	21.4
Majority			16,595	57.2
Turnout			29,053	69.8
Registered electors			41,651	
	National Democratic win (new seat)			
C indicates candidate endorsed by the coalition government.

=== Elections in the 1920s ===
1922 general election: Aberdare
Party	Candidate	Votes	%	±%
Labour	George Hall	20,704	57.2	+35.8
National Liberal	Charles Stanton	15,487	42.8	−35.8
Majority		5,217	14.4	N/A
Turnout		36,191	79.9	+10.1
Registered electors		45,285		
Labour gain from National Democratic		Swing	+35.8	

1923 general election: Aberdare
Party	Candidate	Votes	%	±%
Labour	George Hall	22,379	58.2	+1.0
Liberal	William M. Llewellyn	16,050	41.8	New
Majority		6,329	16.4	+2.0
Turnout		38,429	83.3	+3.4
Registered electors		46,148		
Labour hold		Swing	+1.0	

1924 general election: Aberdare
Party	Candidate	Votes	%	±%
Labour	George Hall	24,343	61.6	+3.4
Liberal	David Bowen (Welsh lawyer)	15,201	38.4	−3.4
Majority		9,142	23.2	+6.8
Turnout		39,544	83.7	+0.4
Registered electors		47,267		
Labour hold		Swing	+3.4	

1929 general election: Aberdare
Party	Candidate	Votes	%	±%
Labour	George Hall	29,550	64.6	+3.0
Liberal	Evan Joshua Roderick	10,594	23.2	−15.2
Unionist	Hugh Molson	5,573	12.2	New
Majority		18,956	41.4	+18.2
Turnout		45,717	84.5	+0.8
Registered electors		54,134		
Labour hold		Swing	+9.1	

=== Elections in the 1930s ===
1931 general election: Aberdare
Party	Candidate	Votes	%	±%
Labour	George Hall	Unopposed		
Labour hold				

1935 general election: Aberdare
Party	Candidate	Votes	%	±%
Labour	George Hall	Unopposed		
Labour hold				

=== Elections in the 1940s ===
1945 general election: Aberdare
Party	Candidate	Votes	%	±%
Labour	George Hall	34,398	84.25	
Conservative	Charles George Clover	6,429	15.75	
Majority		27,969	68.51	
Turnout		40,827	76.25	
Labour hold		Swing		

1946 Aberdare by-election
Party	Candidate	Votes	%	±%
Labour	David Thomas	24,215	68.32	−15.93
Plaid Cymru	Wynne Samuel	7,090	20.00	New
Conservative	Lincoln Hallinan	4,140	11.68	−4.07
Majority		17,125	48.31	−20.2
Turnout		35,445	65.7	−10.5
Labour hold		Swing		

=== Elections in the 1950s ===
1950 general election: Aberdare
Party	Candidate	Votes	%	±%
Labour	David Thomas	33,930	75.9	−8.67
Conservative	Robert N. E. Hinton	6,098	13.6	−1.95
Plaid Cymru	Wynne Samuel	3,310	7.4	N/A
Communist	Alistair T. M. Wilson	1,382	3.1	New
Majority		27,832	62.3	−6.74
Turnout		44,180	85.89	+9.64
Registered electors		51,437		
Labour hold		Swing		

N.B. Changes in 1950 are from the 1945 election and not the 1946 by-election.

1951 general election: Aberdare
Party	Candidate	Votes	%	±%
Labour	David Thomas	34,783	78.55	+2.77
Conservative	Jack Lewis	6,810	15.38	+1.58
Plaid Cymru	Wynne Samuel	2,691	6.08	−1.41
Majority		27,963	63.17	+0.9
Turnout		44,284	86.12	+0.23
Registered electors		51,423		
Labour hold		Swing		

1954 Aberdare by-election
Party	Candidate	Votes	%	±%
Labour	Arthur Probert	24,658	69.48	−9.07
Plaid Cymru	Gwynfor Evans	5,671	15.98	+9.90
Conservative	Michael Roberts	5,158	14.53	−0.85
Majority		18,987	53.50	−9.67
Turnout		35,487	69.7	−16.4
Registered electors		50,916		
Labour hold		Swing		

1955 general election: Aberdare
Party	Candidate	Votes	%	±%
Labour	Arthur Probert	30,889	75.6	+0.6
Conservative	Bernard McGlynn	6,584	16.1	+0.5
Plaid Cymru	Ken P. Thomas	3,367	8.2	New
Majority		24,305	59.5	−0.1
Turnout		40,840	83.1	+4.8
Registered electors		50,333		
Labour hold		Swing		

1959 general election: Aberdare
Party	Candidate	Votes	%	±%
Labour	Arthur Probert	29,528	75.0	−0.6
Conservative	William J. A. Bain	6,162	15.6	−0.5
Welsh Nationalist	Trefor Beasley	3,703	9.4	New
Majority		23,366	59.4	−0.1
Turnout		39,393	78.3	−4.8
Registered electors		49,124		
Labour hold		Swing		

=== Elections in the 1960s ===
1964 general election: Aberdare
Party	Candidate	Votes	%	±%
Labour	Arthur Probert	29,106	77.4	+2.4
Conservative	Peter Price	5,780	15.4	−0.2
Plaid Cymru	Dewi W. Thomas	2,723	7.2	−2.2
Majority		23,326	62.0	+2.6
Turnout		37,609	79.2	+0.9
Registered electors		47,519		
Labour hold		Swing		

1966 general election: Aberdare
Party	Candidate	Votes	%	±%
Labour	Arthur Probert	26,322	73.3	−4.1
Conservative	Peter Price	4,204	11.7	−3.7
Plaid Cymru	J. E. Williams	3,073	8.6	+1.4
Communist	Alistair T. M. Wilson	2,305	6.4	New
Majority		22,118	61.6	−0.4
Turnout		35,904	77.0	−2.2
Registered electors		46,618		
Labour hold		Swing		

=== Elections in the 1970s ===
1970 general election: Aberdare
Party	Candidate	Votes	%	±%
Labour	Arthur Probert	22,817	60.0	−13.3
Plaid Cymru	Gareth Morgan Jones	11,431	30.0	+21.4
Conservative	David C. Purnell	2,484	6.5	−5.2
Communist	Alistair T. M. Wilson	1,317	3.5	−2.9
Majority		11,386	29.9	−31.7
Turnout		38,049	77.9	+0.9
Registered electors		48,771		
Labour hold		Swing		

February 1974 general election: Aberdare
Party	Candidate	Votes	%	±%
Labour Co-op	Ioan Evans	23,805	59.5	−0.5
Plaid Cymru	Glyn Owen	11,973	29.9	−0.1
Conservative	Michael J. Niblock	3,169	7.9	+1.4
Communist	Alistair T. M. Wilson	1,038	2.6	−0.9
Majority		11,832	29.6	−0.3
Turnout		39,985	83.3	+5.3
Labour Co-op hold		Swing		

October 1974 general election: Aberdare
Party	Candidate	Votes	%	±%
Labour Co-op	Ioan Evans	24,197	63.3	+3.8
Plaid Cymru	Glyn Owen	8,133	21.3	−8.6
Conservative	B. G. C. Webb	2,775	7.3	−0.6
Liberal	G. Hill	2,118	5.5	New
Communist	Alistair T. M. Wilson	1,028	2.7	+0.1
Majority		16,064	42.0	+12.4
Turnout		38,251	79.1	−4.2
Labour Co-op hold		Swing		

1979 general election: Aberdare
Party	Candidate	Votes	%	±%
Labour Co-op	Ioan Evans	26,716	71.6	+8.3
Conservative	D. Deere	6,453	17.3	+10.0
Plaid Cymru	Phil Richards	3,652	9.8	−11.5
Communist	Mary Winter	518	1.4	−1.3
Majority		20,263	54.3	+12.3
Turnout		37,339	78.6	−0.5
Labour Co-op hold		Swing		
