= 1951 Soviet Union regional elections =

On 18 February 1951, elections were held for the Supreme Soviets of the Soviet Union's constituent republics.

According to Soviet law, 3,778,000 out of an eligible adult voting population of 113,050,000 were disenfranchised for various reasons.
