= 1951 Danish Landsting election =

Partial Landsting elections were held in Denmark on 3 April 1951, electing representatives of the second (Zealand and Lolland-Falster), third (Bornholm) and fifth (Southern Jutland) constituencies.

== Electoral system ==
The elections took place in two rounds, with the public electing 2,072 members of an electoral college on 3 April, who in turn elected the members of the Landsting on 10 April.

== Results ==
Party	Votes	%	Electors	Seats				
Party	Votes	%	Electors	People's	Parliament	Not up	Total	+/–
Social Democratic Party	259,425	38.72	813	12	9	12	33	0
Venstre	162,398	24.24	555	8	5	9	22	+1
Conservative People's Party	115,500	17.24	357	5	3	4	12	–1
Danish Social Liberal Party	57,416	8.57	159	2	2	2	6	–1
Justice Party of Denmark	49,216	7.35	133	1	0	0	1	+1
Communist Party of Denmark	19,215	2.87	35	0	0	1	1	0
Danish Unity	6,803	1.02	20	0	0	0	0	0
Faroese representative			–	0	0	0	1	0
Total	669,973	100.00	2,072	28	19	28	76	0
