= 1951 United Kingdom general election in England =

- 25 October 1951

All 506 English seats in the House of Commons
- Turnout: 82.7% (▼1.7 pp)
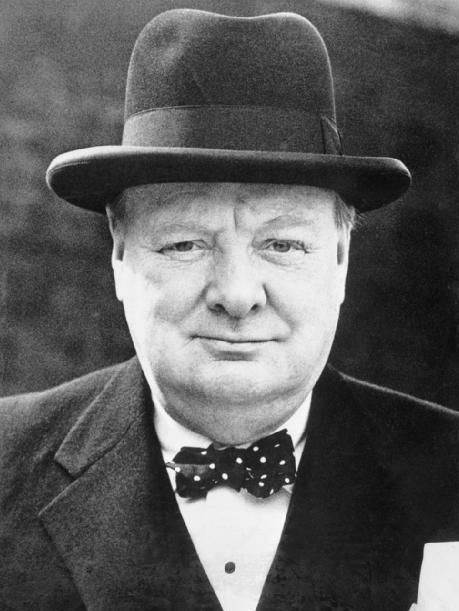

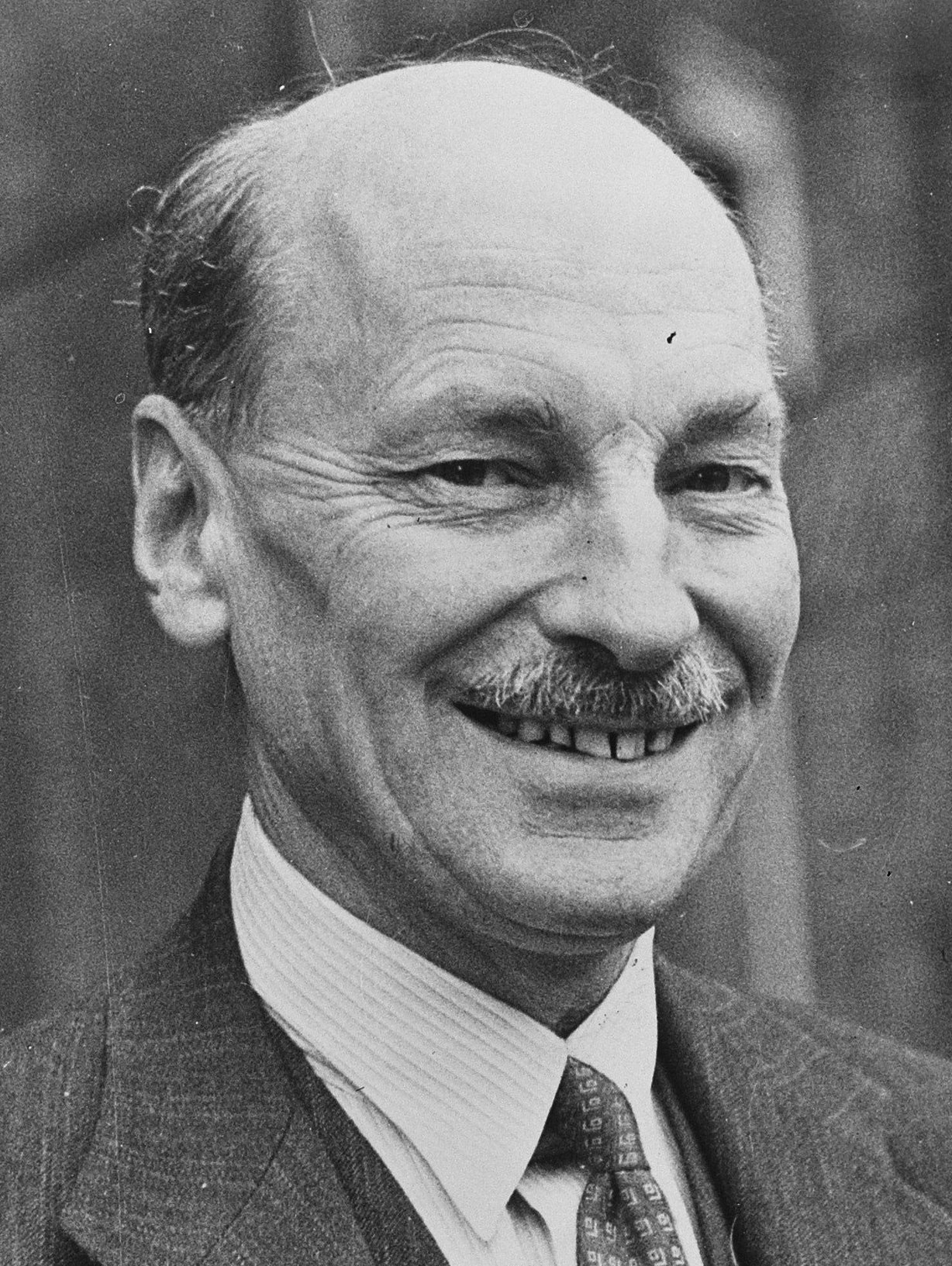

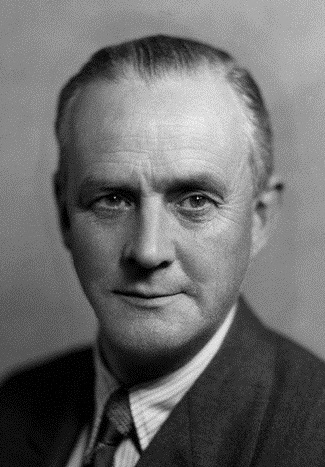
	First party	Second party	Third party
Leader	Winston Churchill	Clement Attlee	Clement Davies
Party	Conservative	Labour	Liberal
Leader since	9 October 1940	25 October 1935	2 August 1945
Leader's seat	Woodford	Walthamstow West	Montgomeryshire
Last election	253 seats, 43.8%	251 seats, 46.1%	2 seats, 9.4%
Seats won	271 (Note: Figure includes Speaker of the House of Commons Douglas Clifton Brown in Hexham.)	233	2
Seat change	▲18	▼18	Steady
Popular vote	11,622,704	11,630,467	537,434
Percentage	48.8%	48.8%	2.3%
Swing	▲5.0 pp	▲2.7 pp	▼7.1 pp

On Thursday 25 October 1951, the 1951 United Kingdom general election was held in England, to elect all 625 members of the House of Commons, with 506 constituencies being in England.

Only 20 months after the previous election, the Labour Government led by incumbent prime minister Clement Attlee decided to call an election primarily because the Labour Party wished to increase its majority. It was the final general election to be held during the reign of King George VI, as he died the following year on 6 February 1951 and was succeeded by his daughter, Queen Elizabeth II.

== Candidates ==
Below is a table summarising the candidates of the 1951 general election in England.

Affiliation	Candidates
Labour Party	506
Conservative and Unionist Party	463
Liberal Party	91
National Liberal Party	39
Communist Party of Great Britain	5
Independent	4
Independent Conservative	2 (Note: The candidates that stood were Colin Gray in Newcastle upon Tyne North and William Brownrigg in Penrith and The Border.)
Irish Anti-Partition League	1 (Note: Candidate Harry McHugh stood in Bootle.)
Independent Labour Party	1 (Note: Candidate Fred Barton stood in Newcastle upon Tyne Central.)
Total	1,112

== Analysis ==
The Labour Party won a mere majority of 5 seats in the House of Commons in 1950. In that election, the Labour Party had won less seats than the Conservative Party in the region of England despite winning a greater share of the vote. However, this election produced an interesting anomaly in England as well as the nation at large - despite the Labour Party winning a greater share of the vote, the Conservative Party won an overall majority, both in the Commons and in England. This occurrence would next take place only in 2005 when the Labour Party would a win a majority of seats in England while the Conservative Party would accumulate a greater share of the vote (however, the Labour Party won a greater share of the vote than the Conservatives in the nation as a whole). This election also noted the highest ever voteshare as well as the total number of votes the Labour Party has ever recorded in any election in England as well as the nation at whole.

The narrow victory of the Conservative Party led to the return of Winston Churchill as prime minister and the start of 13 years of Conservative rule, the second longest period of one-party rule in the twentieth century.

=== Conservatives and Labour ===
Between the Conservative Party and Labour Party, the Conservative Party won 15 seats from Labour. These were Battersea South, Bolton East, Buckingham, Darlington, Doncaster, Dulwich, King's Lynn, Manchester Blackley, Middlesbrough West, Norfolk South West, Oldham East, Plymouth Sutton, Reading North, Rochdale, Wycombe and Yarmouth. Frank Markham won the seat of Buckingham, re-entering Parliament. Markham had repviously held the seat of Chatham as member of the Labour Party and later the defunct National Labour Organisation during the years of the National Government. He would hold Buckingham until 1964. Future Chancellor of the Exchequer Anthony Barber entered Parliament in Doncaster. Frederic Bennett entered Parliament in Reading North. However, the Conservatives would lose a seat to the Liberal Party.

The National Liberal Party, which was within a constituency alliance with the Conservative party, retained its 10 seats from the previous election. In addition, National Liberal candidate Norman Cole won Bedfordshire South, with son of former Prime Minister David Lloyd George, Gwilym Lloyd George, returned to Parliament when he won the seat of Newcastle upon Tyne North. This was a gain internally within the constituency alliance with the Conservatives, with the Conservative Party not standing a candidate in the seat in this election following the retirement of Cuthbert Headlam. Lloyd George had previously held the seat of Pembrokeshire in Wales between 1922 and 1950. The National Liberals therefore increased it number of seats to 12 in this election, with the Conservative and National Liberals gaining a total of 17 from Labour.

=== Liberal Party ===
The Liberal Party only stood 91 candidates, significantly down on the 413 the party stood in the previous election. This was due to the lack of funds available to the party at the time to campaign in the election, as was the case in the rest of the country. Other parties stood a collective 13 candidates.

The Liberal Party gained Bolton West from the Labour Party, with future Liberal Whip Arthur Holt entering Parliament. However, the Liberals lost Eye in Suffolk to the Conservatives, with Conservative candidate Harwood Harrison entering Parliament.

== Results ==
Party	Seats					Aggregate votes		
Party	Total	Gains	Losses	Net	Of all (%)	Total	Of all (%)	Change (%)
Conservative (Total)	271	19	1	▲18	53.6	11,622,704	48.8	▲5.0
Conservative	259	17	1	▲16	51.2	10,855,287	45.6	▲4.6
National Liberal	12	2	0	▲2	2.4	767,417	3.2	▲0.4
Labour	233	0	18	▼18	46.0	11,630,467	48.8	▲2.7
Liberal	2	1	1	Steady	0.4	537,434	2.3	▼7.1
Independent	0	0	0	Steady	—	19,277	0.1	▼0.1
Communist	0	0	0	Steady	—	7,745	0.0	▼0.2
Ind. Conservative	0	0	0	Steady	—	6,062	0.0	▼0.1
Anti-Partition	0	0	0	Steady	—	1,340	0.0	Steady
Ind. Labour Party	0	0	0	Steady	—	1,066	0.0	Steady
Total	506			0	100.0	23,826,095	100.0	0.0
Registered voters, and turnout						28,813,343 (Note: Electorate in contested constituencies, which was all seats in this election.)	82.7	▼1.7

Popular vote
Labour	48.8%
Conservative	48.8%
Liberal	2.3%
Other	0.2%

Parliament seats
Conservative	53.6%
Labour	46.0%
Liberal	0.4%

== See also ==
- 1951 United Kingdom general election in Northern Ireland
- 1951 United Kingdom general election in Scotland
- 1951 United Kingdom general election in Wales
