= 1951 Serbian parliamentary election =

Parliamentary elections were held in the People's Republic of Serbia on 18 March 1951 to elect the 315 members of the National Assembly.

== Background ==
A new electoral law, the Act on the Election of Deputies, was passed on 13 May 1950. The number of deputies in the Assembly was increased from 287 to 315.

== Results ==
Of the 4,396,816 registered voters, 3,854,042 (88%) voted.
