= 1954 Aberdare by-election =

UK parliamentary by-election

The 1954 Aberdare by-election was a parliamentary by-election held on 28 October 1954 for the British House of Commons constituency of Aberdare in Wales. The seat had become vacant when the Labour member of parliament (MP), David Thomas had died on 20 June 1954. Thomas had held the seat since the 1946 by-election. The Labour candidate, Arthur Probert, held the seat for the party. He remained the constituency's MP until his retirement at the February 1974 general election.

== Result ==
1954 Aberdare by-election
Party	Candidate	Votes	%	±%
Labour	Arthur Probert	24,658	69.5	−9.0
Plaid Cymru	Gwynfor Evans	5,671	16.0	+9.9
Conservative	Michael Roberts	5,158	14.5	−0.9
Majority		18,987	53.5	−9.7
Turnout		35,487	69.7	−16.4
Registered electors		50,916		
Labour hold		Swing		
