= David Thomas (British politician) =

British politician

David Emlyn Thomas (16 September 1892 – 20 June 1954) was a Labour Party politician in the United Kingdom. He served as the Member of Parliament for Aberdare, Wales from 1946 to 1954 and was the last former miner to represent the constituency.

== Early life ==
He was born in Maesteg, the town to which his parents had moved from West Wales where his father had worked as a gardener in various country mansions. The family returned for a while to Cardigan and Cilgerran where Thomas received his early education. He subsequently returned to Maesteg and until 1906 attended school there. To his dismay, his father came home from work one day and announced that he had ‘had a start’ for him at the Oakwood colliery. His hopes for further education were thus dashed.

David Thomas was employed as a clerk at three collieries from 1906 to 1915. For five of these years he worked at Torycoed Colliery, Llantrisant. Anxious to further his education, he attended night classes in typing and shorthand. This training proved invaluable to him when, in later years, he attended meetings of the South Wales Miners' Federation (SWMF).

Thomas married Bessie, a teacher, in 1923. She died in September 1953.

== Early career ==
In 1919 he was appointed a full-time Federation official at the SWMF office in Maesteg under Vernon Hartshorn, MP and Evan Williams, JP. Thomas joined the Labour Party in 1919 and was secretary of the Labour Party ward committee in Maesteg.

When the SWMF office in Maesteg closed in 1934 Thomas was transferred to the Federation Office in Aberdare as Area Secretary and, in addition, fulfilled the duties of the Miners’ Agent, Noah Ablett, who was seriously ill. On the death of Ablett, he was elected Miners’ Agent, a role he fulfilled until 1946. He worked tirelessly and efficiently on behalf of the miners, dealing with such matters as compensation cases and the rights of the disabled miners.

An active nonconformist, Thomas was an active member and deacon at Ebenezer, Trecynon.

== Parliamentary career ==
In 1946, on the elevation to a peerage of George Hall, Thomas was chosen by the Aberdare Divisional Socialist Party to contest the vacant parliamentary seat. His maiden speech made in 1947 reflected his concern for the welfare of the miners; he spoke of the inadequate compensation for disabled miners and also the lack of other employment for those suspended from the industry due to injury. He pushed for the construction of factories in the mining areas. When elected MP in 1946, his majority was 17,125; this increased to 27,892 in 1950 and to 27,973 in 1951. He was a member of the Public Accounts Committee of the House of Commons and in 1949-50 was the leader of the Welsh Parliamentary Labour Group in the House.

== Bibliography ==
- Jones, Alan Vernon (2004). Chapels of the Cynon Valley. Cynon Valley Historical Society. ISBN 0953107612.

Parliament of the United Kingdom
| Preceded by George Hall | Member of Parliament for Aberdare; 1946–1954 | Succeeded by Arthur Probert |
