= British Empire Party =

Defunct political party in the UK

The British Empire Party was a minor right-wing party in the United Kingdom. It was founded in the early 1950s by P. J. Ridout, a former member of the Imperial Fascist League.

In the 1951 general election, the party stood one candidate, Trefor David, in Ogmore, who received 1,643 votes. A former Plaid Cymru member and miner, David gained some supporters amongst local miners but saw his support reduced after a local paper revealed the fascist past of Ridout.

The party gained a brief boost in 1951 when Arnold Leese told his followers to join the group, although ultimately the minor levels of support that Leese commanded made little difference.
