= 1951 United Kingdom general election =

- 25 October 1951

All 625 seats in the House of Commons 313 seats needed for a majority
- Opinion polls
- Registered: 34,919,331
- Turnout: 28,596,594; 82.6% (▼1.3 pp)
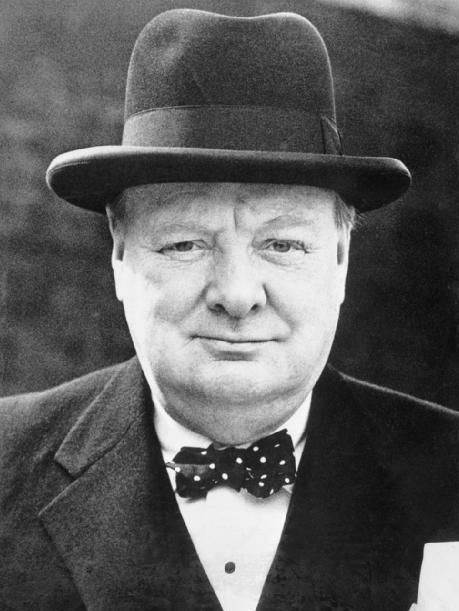

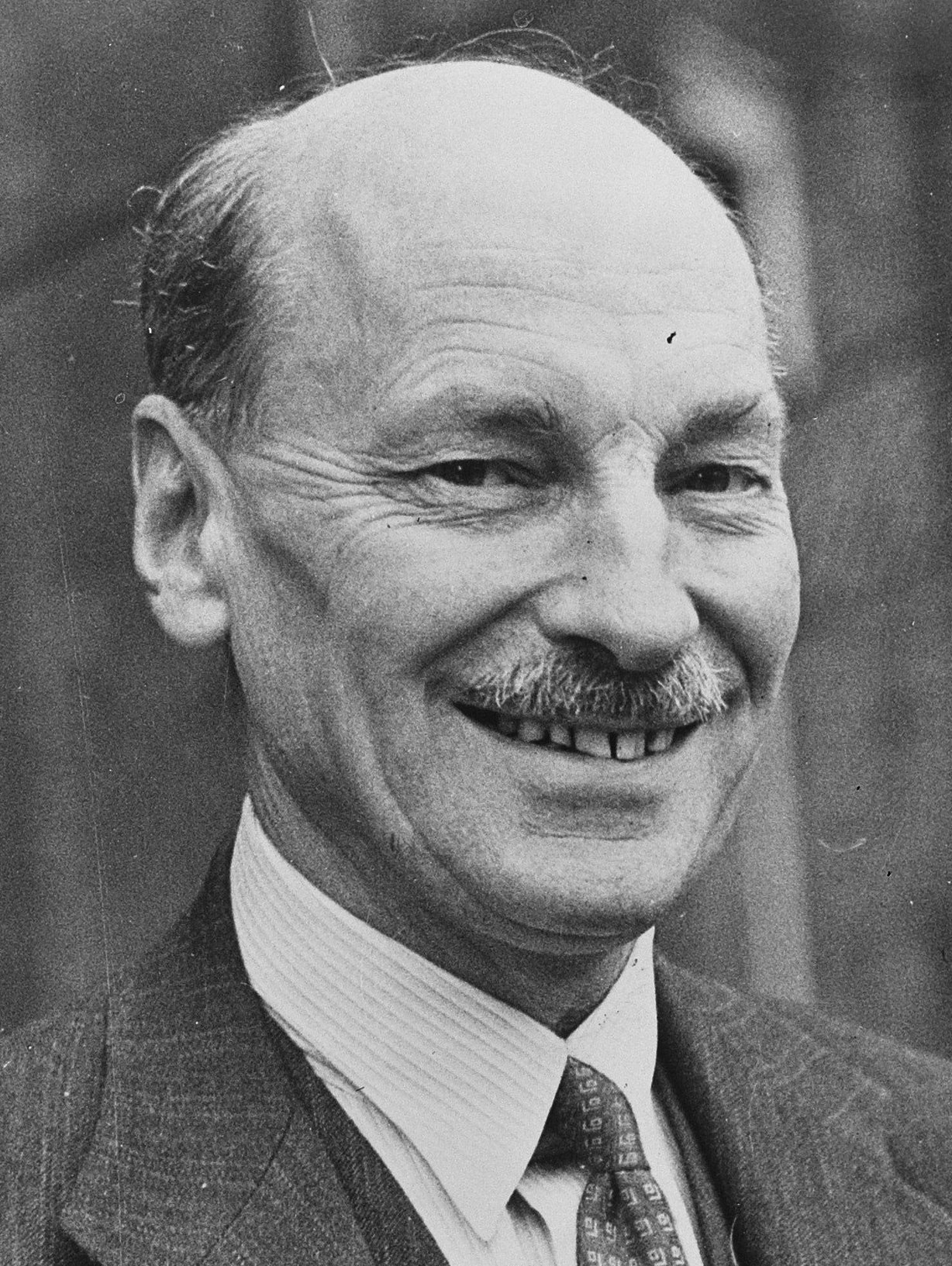

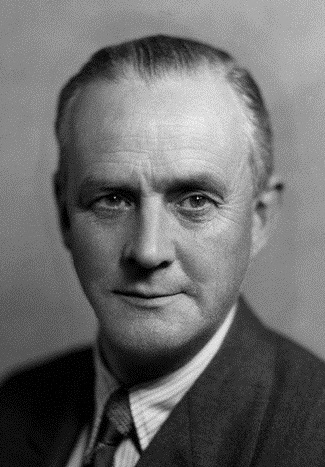
	First party	Second party	Third party
Leader	Winston Churchill	Clement Attlee	Clement Davies
Party	Conservative	Labour	Liberal
Leader since	9 October 1940	25 October 1935	2 August 1945
Leader's seat	Woodford	Walthamstow West	Montgomeryshire
Last election	298 seats, 43.4%	315 seats, 46.1%	9 seats, 9.1%
Seats won	321 (Note: Figure includes Speaker of the House of Commons Douglas Clifton Brown in Hexham.)	295	6
Seat change	▲23	▼20	▼3
Popular vote	13,717,851	13,948,385	730,546
Percentage	48.0%	48.8%	2.6%
Swing	▲4.6 pp	▲2.7 pp	▼6.5 pp
- Colours denote the winning party—as shown in § Results

- Composition of the House of Commons after the election
Prime Minister before election
Clement Attlee
Labour
Prime Minister after election
Winston Churchill
Conservative

A general election was held in the United Kingdom on Thursday, 25 October 1951, just twenty months after the previous general election in 1950; the Labour government called the election in hopes of increasing its parliamentary majority. However, this backfired, as even though Labour won the most votes, it was the Conservatives who won a majority.

Up to that point, the Labour Party achieved the most votes cast for a party; however, this would be surpassed several times, with the Conservatives breaking the record in 1992 and 2019 (13,948,385 is also the highest number of votes Labour ever won in a general election). The Conservatives would also exceed the popular vote percentage (48.8%) achieved by Labour, in 1955 and 1959, winning over 49% in both cases. Turnout in this election declined slightly.

The election marked the return of Winston Churchill as Prime Minister and the beginning of Labour's 13-year spell in opposition. It was the third and final general election to be held during the reign of King George VI, as he died the following year on 6 February and was succeeded by his daughter, Elizabeth II. It was also the last election in which the Conservatives did better in Scotland than in England, and the final election with Winston Churchill as leader of the Conservative Party.

The 1951 election was the second one to be covered on BBC Television. On election night, the results were televised from the BBC Alexandra Palace studio in London. Graham Hutton, David Butler and H. G. Nicholas headed the election night coverage from 10.15pm to 4.00am on the television service. On the following day, television coverage started at 10.00am and continued throughout the day until 5.00pm.

== Background ==
King George VI feared since that the government had such a slim majority, and he was to leave the country to go on his planned Commonwealth tour in early 1952, there was a possibility of a change of government in his absence. Clement Attlee decided to call the election to assuage that concern. (In the event, the King became too ill to travel and delegated the tour to his daughter Princess Elizabeth shortly before his death in February 1952.) Parliament was dissolved on 5 October 1951.

The Labour government, which had implemented most of its manifesto from the 1945 election, was beginning to lose cabinet ministers, such as Ernest Bevin (death) and Stafford Cripps (health issues). The Conservative Party, however, had more MPs since the 1950 general election.

== Campaign ==
The Labour Party entered the election by being weakened by the emerging schism between Gaitskellites, on the right of the party, and the Bevanites, on its left. The party's manifesto stated that the party "proud of its record, sure in its policies—confidently asks the electors to renew its mandate". It identified four key tasks facing the United Kingdom that it would tackle: the need to work for peace, the need to work to "maintain full employment and to increase production", the need to reduce cost of living and the need to "build a just society". The manifesto argued that only a Labour government could achieve those tasks. It also contrasted the Britain of 1951 with that of the interwar years in which there had been largely Conservative-led governments by noting that the interwar period had seen "mass-unemployment; mass fear; mass misery". It did not promise more nationalisations, unlike in the previous year's election, and instead focused on offering more council housing and a pledge to "associate the workers more closely with the administration of public industries and services". However, it remained opposed to full workers' control of industries.

While Labour began to have some policy divisions during the election campaign, the Conservatives ran an efficient campaign, which was well-funded and orchestrated. Their manifesto, Britain Strong and Free, stressed that safeguarding "our traditional way of life" was integral to the Conservative purpose. Significantly, they did not propose to dismantle the British welfare state or the National Health Service which the Labour government had established. The manifesto, however, promised to "stop all further nationalisation" and to repeal the Steel Act, which had been introduced by the Labour government and was being implemented during the election season. The Conservatives also attacked Labour for ending wartime rationing and price controls too slowly and for the rise of industrial conflicts after the end of the wartime wage freeze and the Defence Regulations bans on strike actions.

As for the Liberal Party, its poor election result in 1950 only worsened this time. Unable to get the same insurance against losses of deposits of the previous year, it fielded only 109 candidates, as opposed to 478 in 1950, and thus posted the worst general election result in the party's history by getting just 2.5% of the vote and winning only six seats. The popular vote of the Liberals and later the Liberal Democrats has not fallen so low since, but their lowest number of six seats would be matched in several future elections. The Liberal Party's growing irrelevance weakened the Labour Party since two thirds of potential Liberal voters supported the Conservatives.

Four candidates were returned unopposed, all of them Ulster Unionists in Northern Ireland. It is the most recent general election in which any candidates have been returned unopposed although there have been later unopposed by-elections.

The subsequent Labour defeat was significant for several reasons. The party polled almost a quarter-million votes more than the Conservative Party and its National Liberal Party ally combined; won the most votes that Labour has ever won (as of 2024); and won the most votes of any political party in any election in British political history, a number that would not be surpassed until the Conservative Party's victory in 1992.

However, the Conservative Party formed the next government with a majority of 17 seats. It performed much better with male working-class voters than in the elections of 1945 or 1950 and tipped the vote away from Labour in Lancashire, the Home Counties and East Anglia. Under the first-past-the-post electoral system, many Labour votes were "wasted" because they were included in large majorities for MPs in safe seats.

== Results ==
=== Summary of seats returned ===
Party	Leader	MPs		Aggregate votes	
Party	Leader		Of total		Of total
Conservative and Unionist Party	Winston Churchill	321	51.4%	13,718,199	48.0%
Conservative Party (Note: Conservative and Unionist Party results for England and Wales.)	Winston Churchill	264	42.2%	11,276,812	39.2%
Unionist Party	James Stuart	29	4.6%	1,108,321	3.9%
National Liberal Party	John Maclay	19	3.0%	1,058,138	3.7%
Ulster Unionist Party	Basil Brooke	9	1.4%	274,928	0.9%
Labour Party	Clement Attlee	295 (Note: Includes 16 Co-operative Party MP, as part of the Labour-Co-op alliance.)	47.2%	13,948,883	48.8%
Liberal Party	Clement Davies	6	1.0%	730,546	2.6%
Irish Labour Party	William Norton	1	0.2%	33,174	0.1%
Independent Nationalist	—N/a	1	0.2%	33,097	0.1%
Nationalist Party	James McSparran	1	0.2%	32,714	0.1%

=== Full results ===

Results of the October 1951 general election to the House of Commons of the United Kingdom
Party	Leader	Candidates	MPs					Aggregate votes		
Party	Leader	Candidates	Total	Gains	Losses	Net	Of total (%)	Total	Of total (%)	Change (%)
Labour	Clement; Attlee	617 (Note: Includes 38 Co-operative Party candidates, as part of the Labour-Co-op alliance.)	295 (Note: Includes 16 Co-operative Party MPs, as part of the Labour-Co-op alliance.)	2	22	▼20 (Note: Includes ▼2 Co-operative Party MPs, as part of the Labour-Co-op alliance.)	47.2 (Note: Includes 2.6% for the Co-operative Party, as part of the Labour-Co-op alliance.)	13,948,883 (Note: Includes 845,509 for the Co-operative Party, as part of the Labour-Co-op alliance.)	48.8 (Note: Includes 2.9% for the Co-operative Party, as part of the Labour-Co-op alliance.)	▲2.7 (Note: Includes ▲0.4% for the Co-operative Party, as part of the Labour-Co-op alliance.)
Conservative (Total)	Winston; Churchill	617	321	25	2	▲23	51.4	13,718,199	48.0	▲4.6
Conservative (Note: Figure includes the Unionist Party and the Ulster Unionist Party under their nation affiliations with the Conservative Party.)	Winston; Churchill	562	302	22	2	▲20	48.3	12,660,061	44.3	▲4.3
National Liberal	John; Maclay	55	19	3	0	▲3	3.0	1,058,138	3.7	▲0.3
Liberal	Clement; Davies	109	6	1	4	▼3	1.0	730,546	2.6	▼6.5
Irish Labour	William; Norton	1	0	1	0	▲1	—	33,174	0.1	▼0.1
Independent; Nationalist	—N/a	1	1	Did not stand in 1945		▲1	0.2	33,097	0.1	—N/a
Nationalist	James; McSparran	1	1	0	1	▼1	0.2	32,714	0.1	▼0.1
Independent; Republican	—N/a	1	0	Did not stand in 1945			—	26,976	0.1	—N/a
Communist	Harry; Pollitt	10	0	0	0	Steady	—	21,640	0.1	▼0.2
Independent	—N/a	5	0	0	0	Steady	—	19,633	0.1	▼0.1
Plaid Cymru	Gwynfor; Evans	4	0	0	0	Steady	—	10,920	0.0	▼0.1
SNP	Robert; McIntyre	2	0	0	0	Steady	—	7,299	0.0	Steady
Independent; Conservative	—N/a	2	0	0	0	Steady	—	6,062	0.0	▼0.1
Ind. Labour Party	Fred; Barton	3	0	0	0	Steady	—	4,057	0.0	Steady
British Empire	P. J. Ridout	1	0	New			—	1,643	0.0	New
Anti-Partition	James; McSparran	4	0	0	0	Steady	—	1,340	0.0	Steady
United Socialist Movement	Guy; Aldred	1	0	0	0	Steady	—	411	0.0	Steady
Other non-contested		0	0	—N/a		▼1 (Note: 1 Independent Liberal MP.)	—	0	0.0	—N/a
Total		1,376	625			0	100.0	28,596,594	100.0	0.0
Registered voters, and turnout								34,919,331	82.6	▼1.3

=== Votes summary ===
Popular vote
Labour	48.78%
Conservative	47.97%
Liberal	2.55%
Others	0.70%

Headline swing: 1.13% to Conservative.

=== Seats summary ===
Parliamentary seats
Conservative	51.36%
Labour	47.20%
Liberal	0.96%
Others	0.48%

== Transfers of seats ==
All comparisons are with the 1950 election. (Note: No seats changed hands during the 1950–51 Parliament.)

From	To	No.	Seats
Labour	Labour (HOLD)	273	
Labour	Liberal	1	Bolton West
Labour	Conservative	20	Barry, Battersea South, Berwick and East Lothian, Bolton East, Buckingham, Conway, Darlington, Doncaster, Dulwich, King's Lynn, Manchester Blackley, Middlesbrough West, Norfolk South West, Oldham East, Plymouth Sutton, Reading North, Rochdale, Rutherglen, Wycombe, Yarmouth
Labour	National Liberal	1	Bedfordshire South
Nationalist	Nationalist (HOLD)	1	Fermanagh and South Tyrone
Nationalist	Ind. Nationalist	1	Mid Ulster
Liberal	Labour	2	Anglesey, Meirioneth
Liberal	Liberal (HOLD)	5	Cardiganshire, Carmarthen, Huddersfield West, Montgomery, Orkney and Shetland
Liberal	Conservative	2	Eye, Roxburgh and Selkirk
National Liberal	National Liberal (HOLD)	16	Angus North and Mearns, Angus South, Bedfordshire South, Bradford North, Denbigh, Dumfriesshire, Fife East, Harwich, Holland with Boston, Huntingdonshire, Luton, Norfolk Central, Renfrewshire West, Ross and Cromarty, St Ives, Torrington
Conservative	National Liberal	1	Newcastle upon Tyne North
Conservative	Conservative (HOLD)	many	
Speaker	Conservative (HOLD)	1	Hexham
UUP	Irish Labour	1	Belfast West
UUP	UUP	9	North Antrim, South Antrim, Armagh, Belfast East, Belfast North, Belfast South, Down North, Down South, Londonderry

== See also ==
- List of MPs elected in the 1951 United Kingdom general election
- 1951 United Kingdom general election in England
- 1951 United Kingdom general election in Scotland
- 1951 United Kingdom general election in Wales
- 1951 United Kingdom general election in Northern Ireland
- 1951 Prime Minister's Resignation Honours
