= List of elections in 1959 =

The following is a list of elections that occurred in the year 1959.

== Africa ==
- 1959 Ivorian parliamentary election
- 1959 Liberian general election
- 1959 Mauritanian parliamentary election
- 1959 Mauritian general election
- 1959 Nigerian parliamentary election
- 1959 Senegalese parliamentary election
- 1959 Tunisian general election
- 1959 Upper Volta Territorial Assembly election

== Asia ==
- 1959 Cambodian constitutional referendum
- 1959 Israeli legislative election
- 1959 Israeli municipal elections
- 1959 Japanese House of Councillors election
- 1959 Malayan general election
- 1959 Malayan local elections
- 1959 Nepalese general election
- 1959 North Korean local elections
- 1959 North Korean parliamentary by-election (By-election held due to vacancies in more than a quarter of parliamentary seats)
- 1959 Singaporean general election
- 1959 South Vietnamese parliamentary election
- 1959 Soviet Union regional elections

== Australia ==
- 1959 Cook's River state by-election
- 1959 Lismore state by-election
- 1959 New South Wales state election
- 1959 South Australian state election
- 1959 Tasmanian state election
- 1959 Western Australian state election

== Europe ==
- 1959 Cypriot presidential election
- 1959 Fianna Fáil leadership election
- 1959 French municipal elections
- 1959 Gibraltar general election
- 1959 Irish presidential election
- 1959 Norwegian local elections
- 1959 San Marino general election
- 1959 Soviet Union regional elections
- 1959 Swiss federal election
- 1959 Swiss referendums

=== Austria ===
- 1959 Austrian legislative election

=== France ===
- 1959 French municipal elections

=== Germany ===
- 1959 Rhineland-Palatinate state election
- 1959 West German presidential election

=== United Kingdom ===
- 1959 United Kingdom general election
  - England: 1959 United Kingdom general election in England
  - Scotland: 1959 United Kingdom general election in Scotland
  - Wales: 1959 United Kingdom general election in Wales
  - Northern Ireland: 1959 United Kingdom general election in Northern Ireland
  - List of MPs elected in the 1959 United Kingdom general election
- 1959 Belfast East by-election
- 1959 Clitheroe by-election
- 1959 Galloway by-election
- 1959 Harrow East by-election
- 1959 Penistone by-election
- 1959 Southend West by-election
- 1959 Whitehaven by-election

==== United Kingdom local ====
===== English local =====
- 1959 Bermondsey Borough election
- 1959 Southwark Borough election

== North America ==
=== Canada ===
- 1959 Alberta general election
- 1959 Edmonton municipal election
- 1959 Manitoba general election
- 1959 Newfoundland general election
- 1959 Ontario general election
- 1959 Prince Edward Island general election

=== United States ===
==== United States gubernatorial ====
- 1959 Hawaii gubernatorial election
- 1959 Kentucky gubernatorial election
- 1959 Mississippi gubernatorial election
- 1959 United States gubernatorial elections

==== United States House of Representatives ====
- 1959 United States House of Representatives elections

==== United States Senate ====
- 1959 United States Senate elections in Hawaii

==== United States mayoral elections ====
- 1959 Baltimore mayoral election
- 1959 Chicago mayoral election
- 1959 Cleveland mayoral election
- 1959 Evansville mayoral election
- 1959 Hartford, Connecticut mayoral election
- 1959 Indianapolis mayoral election
- 1959 Manchester, New Hampshire mayoral election
- 1959 Philadelphia mayoral election
- 1959 Pittsburgh mayoral special election
- 1959 San Diego mayoral election
- 1959 San Francisco mayoral election
- 1959 Sioux Falls mayoral election
- 1959 Springfield, Massachusetts, mayoral election
- 1959 Tampa mayoral election

== Oceania ==
=== Australia ===
- 1959 Cook's River state by-election
- 1959 Lismore state by-election
- 1959 New South Wales state election
- 1959 South Australian state election
- 1959 Tasmanian state election
- 1959 Western Australian state election

== Other ==
- 1959 Central African Republic parliamentary election
- 1959 Chadian parliamentary election
- 1959 Dahomeyan legislative election
- 1959 Dutch general election
- 1959 French Sudan parliamentary election
- 1959 Guatemalan parliamentary election
- June 1959 Icelandic parliamentary election
- October 1959 Icelandic parliamentary election
- 1959 Italian Somaliland parliamentary election
- 1959 Liberian general election
- 1959 Luxembourg general election
- 1959 Mauritian general election
- 1959 Moyen-Congo parliamentary election
- 1959 Norwegian local elections
- 1959 Philippine Senate election
- 1958–1959 Tanganyikan general election
