= 1959 United Kingdom general election in Scotland =

- 8 October 1959

All 71 Scottish seats to the House of Commons
- Turnout: 78.1% (▲3.0 pp)
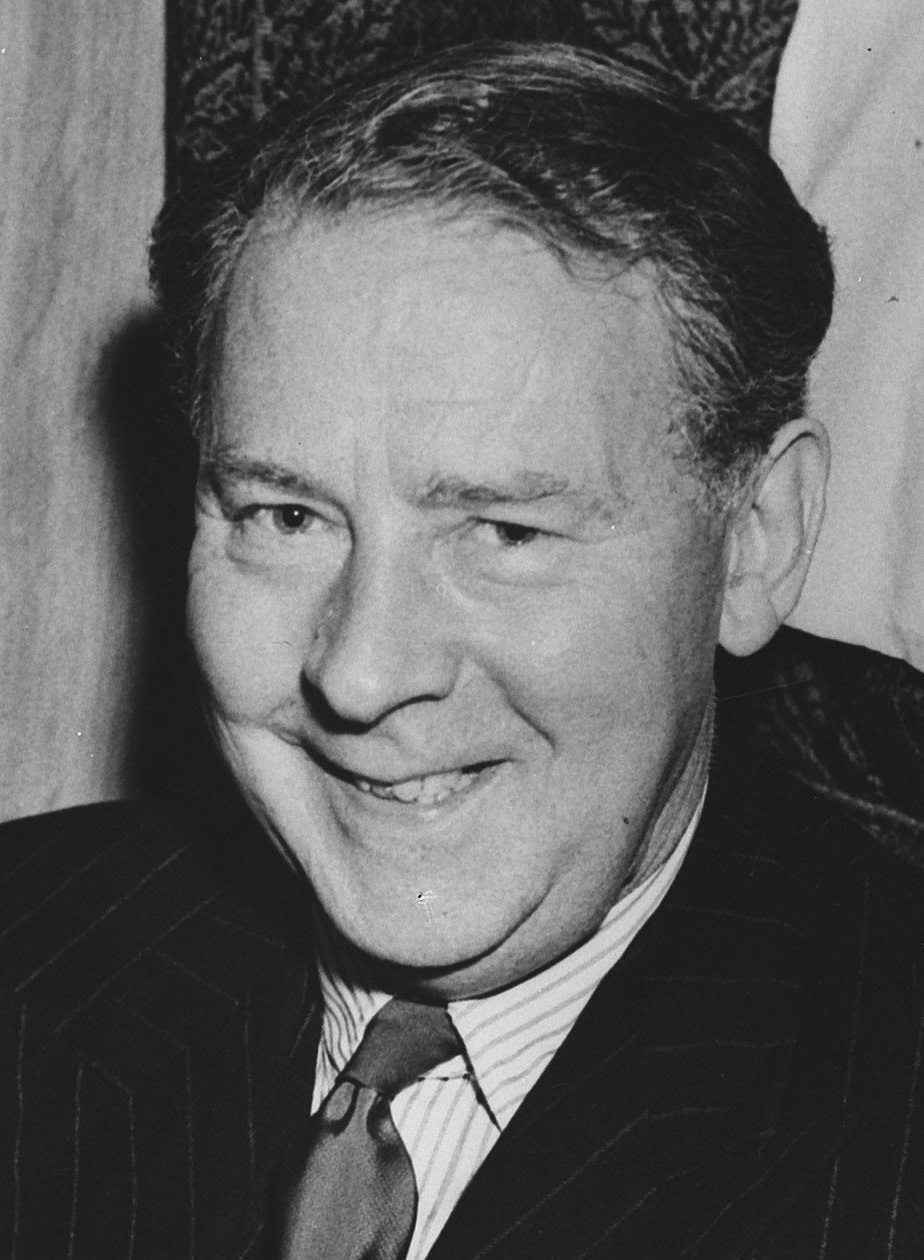

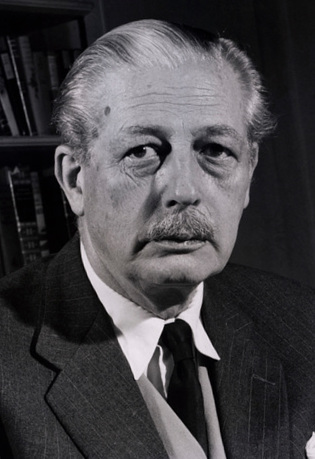

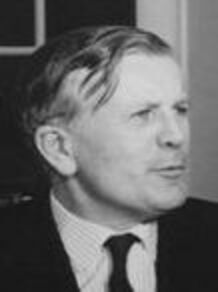
| | First party | Second party | Third party |
|---|---|---|---|
| Leader | Hugh Gaitskell | Harold Macmillan | Jo Grimond |
| Party | Labour | Unionist | Liberal |
| Alliance | | Conservative | Liberal |
| Leader since | 14 December 1955 | 10 January 1957 | 5 November 1956 |
| Leader's seat | Leeds South | Bromley | Orkney and Shetland |
| Last election | 34 seats, 46.7% | 36 seats, 50.1% | 1 seat, 1.9% |
| Seats won | 38 | 31 (Note: The seat and vote count figures for the Unionists given here include the National Liberals) | 1 |
| Seat change | ▲4 | ▼5 | Steady |
| Popular vote | 1,245,255 | 1,260,287 | 108,963 |
| Percentage | 46.7% | 47.3% | 4.1% |
| Swing | Steady | ▼2.8 pp | ▲2.1 pp |

On 8 October 1959, the 1959 United Kingdom general election was held in Scotland to elect all 630 seats of the House of Commons, with 71 constituencies being in Scotland.

== Candidates ==
Below is a table summarising the candidates of the 1959 general election in Scotland.

| Affiliation | Candidates |
|---|---|
| Labour Party | 71 |
| Unionist Party | 59 |
| Liberal Party | 16 |
| National Liberal Party | 11 |
| Communist Party of Great Britain | 6 |
| Scottish National Party | 5 |
| Independent Unionist | 1 (Note: Candidate David Robertson stood in Caithness and Sutherland.) |
| Fife Socialist League | 1 (Note: Candidate Lawrence Daly stood in West Fife.) |
| Independent | 1 (Note: Candidate David Murray stood in Motherwell.) |
| Independent Labour Party | 1 (Note: Candidate William Park stood in Glasgow Kelvingrove.) |
| Total | 172 |

== Analysis ==
The Unionists, who were in a national affiliation with the Conservative Party, together with their allies the National Liberal Party, won the largest number of votes, but lost out in seats to the Labour Party. Across the UK as a whole, the Conservatives won 365 seats, and returned as government with a majority of 100 seats.

In Scotland, the Unionists lost Ayrshire Central, Glasgow Craigton, Glasgow Scotstoun and Lanark to the Labour Party. It also lost Caithness and Sutherland to Independent Unionist David Robertson. Robertson had been initially elected as a member of the Unionist Party in 1950, however, stood as an independent unionist following his resignation from the party whip in 1959. Robertson was not opposed by an official Unionist candidate. The National Liberal Party retained its seats of Dumfriesshire, East Fife, South Angus, North Angus and Mearns, West Renfrewshire and Ross and Cromarty.

The Unionists therefore lost an overall of five seats in Scotland. The Labour Party correspondingly won four seats, becoming the largest party in Scotland by seats. Jo Grimond, now party leader for the Liberals, was returned as his party's only MP, representing Orkney and Shetland.

== Results ==
| Party | Seats | | | | | Aggregate votes | | |
| Party | Total | Gains | Losses | Net | Of total (%) | Total | Of total (%) | Change (%) |
|---|---|---|---|---|---|---|---|---|
| Labour Party | 38 | 4 | 0 | ▲4 | 53.5 | 1,245,255 | 46.7 | Steady |
| Unionist (Total) | 31 | 0 | 5 | ▼5 | 43.7 | 1,260,287 | 47.3 | ▼2.8 |
| Unionist | 25 | 0 | 5 | ▼5 | 35.2 | 1,060,609 | 39.8 | ▼1.7 |
| National Liberal | 6 | 0 | 0 | Steady | 8.5 | 199,678 | 7.5 | ▼1.1 |
| Liberal | 1 | 0 | 0 | Steady | 0.0 | 108,963 | 4.1 | ▲2.1 |
| Independent Unionist | 1 (Note: David Robertson in Caithness and Sutherland.) | Did not stand in 1955 | | ▲1 | 1.4 | 12,163 | 0.5 | —N/a |
| SNP | 0 | 0 | 0 | Steady | — | 21,738 | 0.8 | ▲0.3 |
| Communist | 0 | 0 | 0 | Steady | — | 12,150 | 0.5 | Steady |
| Fife Socialist League | 0 | New | | | — | 4,886 | 0.2 | New |
| Independent | 0 | Did not stand in 1955 | | | — | 1,331 | 0.1 | —N/a |
| Ind. Labour Party | 0 | 0 | 0 | Steady | — | 740 | 0.0 | ▼0.1 |
| Total | 71 | | | 0 | 100.0 | 2,667,513 | 100.0 | 0.0 |
| Registered voters, and turnout | | | | | | 3,413,732 | 78.1 | ▲3.0 |

Popular vote
| Unionist | 47.25% |
| Labour | 46.68% |
| Liberal | 4.08% |
| Other | 1.99% |

Parliamentary seats
| Labour | 53.52% |
| Unionist | 43.66% |
| Liberal | 1.41% |
| Ind. Unionist | 1.41% |

== See also ==
- 1959 United Kingdom general election in England
- 1959 United Kingdom general election in Wales
- 1959 United Kingdom general election in Northern Ireland
- List of MPs for constituencies in Scotland (1959–1964)
