= Antson =

Antson is an Estonian surname. Notable people with the surname include:

- Aleksander Antson (1899–1945), Estonian author, athletics competitor and journalist
- Ants Antson (1938–2015), Estonian speed skater
