= List of members of the Supreme Soviet of the Estonian Soviet Socialist Republic, 1959–1963 =

This is a list of members of the fifth legislature of the Supreme Soviet of the Estonian Soviet Socialist Republic, which was the Estonian Soviet Socialist Republic's legislative chamber between 1940 and 1941 and between 1944 and 1992. The session ran from 15 March 1959 to 17 March 1963 and followed the 1959 Estonian Supreme Soviet election, in which only Bloc of Communists and Non-Party Candidates was the only party able to contest the elections.

== List of members ==
Source: Jaan Toomla, Valitud ja Valitsenud: Eesti parlamentaarsete ja muude esinduskogude ning valitsuste isikkoosseis aastail 1917–1999 (National Library of Estonia, 1999), pp. 93–95.

Name	Party
Agu Aarna	
Eevi Aassalu	-, NLKP
Georgi Abašvili	NLKP
Georg Abels	NLKP
Eduard Alba	NLKP
Hendrik Allik	NLKP
Karl Allikas	NLKP
Valter Ani	NLKP
Aleksander Ansberg	NLKP
Asta Arik	
Rosamunde Aulas	NLKP
Edgar-Rudolf Beek	NLKP
Ivan Beljajev	NLKP
Leontine Deksnis	
Johan Eichfeld	-, NLKP
Eduard Einmann	NLKP
Kaljo Erm	NLKP
Gustav Ernesaks	
Harald Faelman	NLKP
August Goldberg	NLKP
Leonid Golovatšov	NLKP
Arnold Green	NLKP
Florida-Elfride Heapost	NLKP
Aleksandr Hromov	NLKP
Erika Ilmjärv	NLKP
Harald Ilves	NLKP
Helgi Israel	
Ida Jürna	NLKP
Leida Kaldra	NLKP
Leida Kamp	
Ivan Karpov	NLKP
Elmar Kase	
Arnold Kivistik	
Minna Klement	NLKP
Heino Kokkuta	NLKP
Leonid Kolobov	NLKP
Aleksei Kotov	NLKP
Ally Kottisse	NLKP
Hilda Kruusalu	NLKP
August Kründel	NLKP
Linda Kubja	
Eduard Kubjas	NLKP
Evi Kulbas	
Mihkel Kullamägi	
Nikandr Kuzin	NLKP
Dimitri Kuzmin	NLKP
Helga Kuuli	
Harri Kuusemets	NLKP
Tiit Kuusik	
August Kuusk	NLKP
Johannes Käbin	NLKP
Aleksander Laansalu	NLKP
Salme Laas (Muršak)	
Voldemar Laos	NLKP
Arseni Leonov	NLKP
Salme Lepa	NLKP
Leida Lepala	
Vaike Lepp	NLKP
Lisete-Johanna Lomp	
Ago Madik	NLKP
Laine Maisvee	NLKP
Rudolf Meijel	NLKP
Otto Merimaa	NLKP
Harald Männik	NLKP
Aleksei Müürisepp	NLKP
Gustav Naan	NLKP
Magdalena Nahkor	
Paul Neerot	NLKP
Georg Nellis	NLKP
Leida Nestor	
Ivan Oja	NLKP
Danil Onjanov	NLKP
Ervin Onton	
Helga Õtsa	
Leili Ounapu	NLKP
Kaarel Paas (Pauk)	NLKP
Lia Paaver	
Aleksander Parika	
Vladimir Pronin	NLKP
Aarne Pung	
Endel Puusepp	NLKP
Felix Pärtelpoeg	NLKP
Jaroslav Raid	NLKP
Ernst Raudam	
Artur Reisalu	
Helmi Rekkor	
Arnold Rohtla	NLKP
Alfred Rosenberg	NLKP
Margarethe Rosenberg	
Juta Ruiso	
Hilda Rõlkova	NLKP
August Saaremägi	NLKP
Joosep Saat	NLKP
Herman Sadam	NLKP
Aleksander Sall	
Rudolf Sirge	
Jevgeni Slivin	NLKP
Linda Soovik	NLKP
Vengi-Alide Stamberg	
Jüri Suurhans	NLKP
Leida Sõrmus	
Tatjana Zemljanko	ÜLKNÜ
Grigori Životnikov	NLKP
Eduard Talviste	
Aliide Tamme	NLKP
Hilda Tammik	NLKP
Anatoli Tihane	NLKP
Boris Tolbast	NLKP
Stepan Tšernikov	NLKP
Arnold Tõnissoo	NLKP
Edgar Tõnurist	NLKP
Johannes Undusk	NLKP
Ida Usin	
Fjodor Ušanjov	NLKP
Õie Väärne (Lauk)	
Karl Vaino	NLKP
Hilje Vannas	NLKP
Martin Varik	NLKP
Albert Vendelin	NLKP
Feliks Voolens	NLKP
Arnold Vunk	NLKP
Vaino Väljas	NLKP
Aino Värava	
Artur Õlekõrs	
Johannes Üts	NLKP
