= List of MPs elected in the 1959 United Kingdom general election =

1959–1964 Parliament of the United Kingdom
←	1955–1959 Parliament	1964–1966 Parliament	→
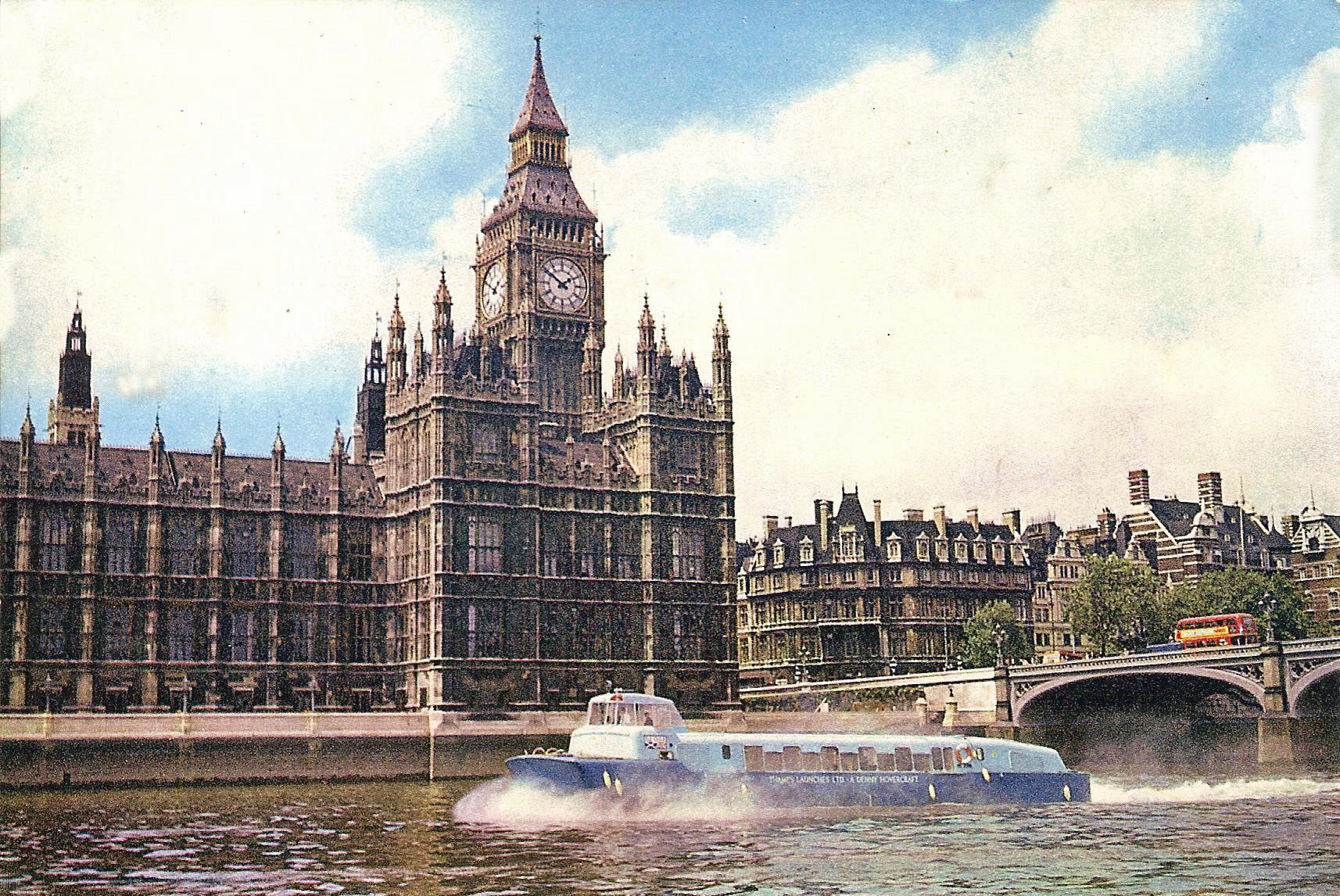
- Palace of Westminster in 1963

Overview
- Legislative body: Parliament of the United Kingdom
- Term: 8 October 1959 – 9 October 1964
- Election: 1959 United Kingdom general election
- Government: Second Macmillan ministry Douglas-Home ministry

House of Commons
- Members: 630
- Speaker: Harry Hylton-Foster
- Leader: R. A. Butler; Iain Macleod; Selwyn Lloyd
- Prime Minister: Harold Macmillan; Alec Douglas-Home
- Leader of the Opposition: Hugh Gaitskell; George Brown; Harold Wilson
- Third-party leader: Jo Grimond

House of Lords
- Lord Chancellor: Viscount Kilmuir; Baron Dilhorne

Crown-in-Parliament Elizabeth II

Sessions
- 1st: 20 October 1959 – 27 October 1960
- 2nd: 1 November 1960 – 24 October 1961
- 3rd: 31 October 1961 – 25 October 1962
- 4th: 30 October 1962 – 24 October 1963
- 5th: 12 November 1963 – 31 July 1964

This is a list of members of Parliament elected to the Parliament of the United Kingdom at the 1959 general election, held on 8 October 1959.

Notable newcomers to the House of Commons included Margaret Thatcher, Nicholas Ridley, Jim Prior, Peter Tapsell, John Morris and Jeremy Thorpe. It was also the final election in which Winston Churchill, then aged 84, stood as a candidate. Tapsell retired from Parliament 56 years later, at the 2015 general election.

== Composition ==
These representative diagrams show the composition of the parties at the 1959 general election.

Note: This is not the official seating plan of the House of Commons, which has five rows of benches on each side, with the government party to the right of the speaker and opposition parties to the left, but with room for only around two-thirds of MPs to sit at any one time.

Affiliation	Members
Conservative Party	365
Labour Party	258
Liberal Party	6
Independent Conservative	1
Total	630
Effective government majority	49

== A ==
Constituency	MP	Party
Aberavon	John Morris	Labour
Aberdare	Arthur Probert	Labour
Aberdeen North	Hector Hughes	Labour
Aberdeen South	Lady Tweedsmuir	Conservative
Aberdeenshire East	Patrick Wolrige-Gordon	Conservative
Aberdeenshire West	Forbes Hendry	Conservative
Abertillery	Llywelyn Williams	Labour
Abingdon	Airey Neave	Conservative
Accrington	Henry Hynd	Labour
Acton	Philip Holland	Conservative
Aldershot	Eric Errington	Conservative
Altrincham and Sale	FJ Errol	Conservative
Anglesey	Cledwyn Hughes	Labour
Angus North and Mearns	Colin Thornton-Kemsley	Liberal and Conservative
Angus South	Sir James Duncan, Bt.	Liberal and Conservative
Antrim North	Henry Clark	Ulster Unionist
Antrim South	Knox Cunningham	Ulster Unionist
Argyll	Michael Noble	Conservative
Armagh	John Maginnis	Ulster Unionist
Arundel and Shoreham	Henry Kerby	Conservative
Ashfield	William Warbey	Labour
Ashford	Bill Deedes	Conservative
Ashton-under-Lyne	Hervey Rhodes	Labour
Aylesbury	Spencer Summers	Conservative
Ayr	Sir Thomas Moore, Bt.	Conservative
Ayrshire Central	Archie Manuel	Labour
Ayrshire, North, and Bute	Fitzroy Maclean	Conservative
Ayrshire South	Emrys Hughes	Labour
== B ==
Banbury	Neil Marten	Conservative
Banffshire	William Duthie	Conservative
Barking	Tom Driberg	Labour
Barkston Ash	Leonard Ropner	Conservative
Barnet	Reginald Maudling	Conservative
Barnsley	Roy Mason	Labour
Barons Court	Bill Carr	Conservative
Barrow-in-Furness	Walter Monslow	Labour
Barry	Raymond Gower	Conservative
Basingstoke	Denzil Freeth	Conservative
Bassetlaw	Fred Bellenger	Labour
Bath	James Pitman	Conservative
Batley and Morley	Alfred Broughton	Labour
Battersea North	Douglas Jay	Labour
Battersea South	Ernest Partridge	Conservative
Bebington	Hendrie Oakshott	Conservative
Beckenham	Philip Goodhart	Conservative
Bedford	Christopher Soames	Conservative
Bedfordshire, Mid	Alan Lennox-Boyd	Conservative
Bedfordshire South	Norman Cole	Liberal and Conservative
Bedwellty	Harold Finch	Labour
Belfast East	Stanley McMaster	Ulster Unionist
Belfast North	Stratton Mills	Ulster Unionist
Belfast South	Sir David Campbell	Ulster Unionist
Belfast West	Patricia McLaughlin	Ulster Unionist
Belper	George Brown	Labour
Bermondsey	Bob Mellish	Labour
Berwick and East Lothian	William Anstruther-Gray	Conservative
Berwick upon Tweed	Antony Lambton	Conservative
Bethnal Green	Percy Holman	Labour
Bexley	Edward Heath	Conservative
Billericay	Edward Gardner	Conservative
Bilston	Robert Edwards	Labour
Birkenhead	Percy Collick	Labour
Birmingham All Saints	John Hollingworth	Conservative
Birmingham Aston	Julius Silverman	Labour
Birmingham Edgbaston	Edith Pitt	Conservative
Birmingham Hall Green	Aubrey Jones	Conservative
Birmingham Handsworth	Sir Edward Boyle	Conservative
Birmingham Ladywood	Victor Yates	Labour
Birmingham Northfield	Donald Chapman	Labour
Birmingham Perry Barr	Charles Howell	Labour
Birmingham Selly Oak	Harold Gurden	Conservative
Birmingham Small Heath	William Wheeldon	Labour
Birmingham Sparkbrook	Leslie Seymour	Conservative
Birmingham Stechford	Roy Jenkins	Labour
Birmingham Yardley	Leonard Cleaver	Conservative
Bishop Auckland	James Boyden	Labour
Blackburn	Barbara Castle	Labour
Blackpool North	Toby Low	Conservative
Blackpool South	Roland Robinson	Conservative
Blaydon	Robert Woof	Labour
Blyth	Alfred Robens	Labour
Bodmin	Douglas Marshall	Conservative
Bolsover	Harold Neal	Labour
Bolton East	Philip Bell	Conservative
Bolton West	Arthur Holt	Liberal
Bootle	Simon Mahon	Labour
Bosworth	Woodrow Wyatt	Labour
Bothwell	John Timmons	Labour
Bournemouth East and Christchurch	John Cordle	Conservative
Bournemouth West	John Eden	Conservative
Bradford East	Frank McLeavy	Labour
Bradford North	William Taylor	Conservative & National Liberal
Bradford South	George Craddock	Labour
Bradford West	Arthur Tiley	Conservative & National Liberal
Brecon and Radnor	Tudor Watkins	Labour
Brentford and Chiswick	Dudley Smith	Conservative
Bridgwater	Gerald Wills	Conservative
Bridlington	Hon. Richard Wood	Conservative
Brierley Hill	J. E. Talbot	Conservative
Brigg	Lance Mallalieu	Labour
Brighouse and Spenborough	John Edwards	Labour
Brighton Kemptown	David James	Conservative
Brighton Pavilion	William Teeling	Conservative
Bristol Central	Stan Awbery	Labour
Bristol North East	Alan Hopkins	Conservative & National Liberal
Bristol North West	Martin McLaren	Conservative
Bristol South	William A. Wilkins	Labour
Bristol South East	Tony Benn	Labour
Bristol West	Robert Cooke	Conservative
Brixton	Marcus Lipton	Labour
Bromley	Harold Macmillan	Conservative
Bromsgrove	James Dance	Conservative
Buckingham	Frank Markham	Conservative
Buckinghamshire South	Ronald Bell	Conservative
Burnley	Daniel Jones	Labour
Burton	John Jennings	Conservative
Bury and Radcliffe	John Bidgood	Conservative
Bury St Edmunds	William Aitken	Conservative
== C ==
Caernarfon	Goronwy Roberts	Labour
Caerphilly	Ness Edwards	Labour
Caithness and Sutherland	David Robertson	Independent Conservative
Cambridge	Hamilton Kerr	Conservative
Cambridgeshire	Gerald Howard	Conservative
Cannock	Jennie Lee	Labour
Canterbury	Leslie Thomas	Conservative
Cardiff North	Donald Box	Conservative
Cardiff South East	James Callaghan	Labour
Cardiff West	George Thomas	Labour
Cardiganshire	Roderic Bowen	Liberal
Carlisle	Donald Johnson	Conservative
Carlton	Kenneth Pickthorn	Conservative
Carmarthen	Lady Megan Lloyd George	Labour
Carshalton	Antony Head	Conservative
Cheadle	William Shepherd	Conservative
Chelmsford	Hubert Ashton	Conservative
Chelsea	John Litchfield	Conservative
Cheltenham	W. W. Hicks Beach	Conservative
Chertsey	Lionel Heald	Conservative
Chester, City of	John Temple	Conservative
Chesterfield	George Benson	Labour
Chester-le-Street	Norman Pentland	Labour
Chichester	Walter Loveys	Conservative
Chigwell	John Biggs-Davison	Conservative
Chippenham	David Eccles	Conservative
Chislehurst	Patricia Hornsby-Smith	Conservative
Chorley	Clifford Kenyon	Labour
Cirencester and Tewkesbury	Hon. Nicholas Ridley	Conservative
Cities of London and Westminster	Harry Hylton-Foster	Conservative
Clapham	Alan Glyn	Conservative
Cleveland	Wilfred Proudfoot	Conservative
Clitheroe	Francis Pearson	Conservative
Coatbridge and Airdrie	James Dempsey	Labour
Colchester	Cuthbert Alport	Conservative
Colne Valley	Glenvil Hall	Labour
Consett	William Stones	Labour
Conway	Peter Thomas	Conservative
Cornwall, North	James Scott-Hopkins	Conservative
Coventry East	Richard Crossman	Labour
Coventry North	Maurice Edelman	Labour
Coventry South	Philip Hocking	Conservative
Crewe	Scholefield Allen	Labour
Crosby	Graham Page	Conservative
Croydon North-East	John Hughes-Hallett	Conservative
Croydon North-West	Fred Harris	Conservative
Croydon South	Richard Thompson	Conservative
== D ==
Dagenham	John Parker	Labour
Darlington	Anthony Bourne-Arton	Conservative
Dartford	Sydney Irving	Labour
Darwen	Charles Fletcher-Cooke	Conservative
Dearne Valley	Edwin Wainwright	Labour
Denbigh	Geraint Morgan	Conservative
Deptford	Sir Leslie Plummer	Labour
Derby North	Clifford Wilcock	Labour
Derby South	Philip Noel-Baker	Labour
Derbyshire North East	Thomas Swain	Labour
Derbyshire South East	John Jackson	Conservative
Derbyshire West	Edward Wakefield	Conservative
Devizes	Percivall Pott	Conservative
Devon, North	Jeremy Thorpe	Liberal
Dewsbury	David Ginsburg	Labour
Don Valley	Richard Kelley	Labour
Doncaster	Anthony Barber	Conservative
Dorking	Sir Gordon Touche	Conservative
Dorset North	Sir Richard Glyn	Conservative
Dorset South	Victor Montagu	Conservative
Dorset West	Simon Wingfield Digby	Conservative
Dover	John Arbuthnot	Conservative
Down North	George Currie	Ulster Unionist
Down South	Lawrence Orr	Ulster Unionist
Dudley	George Wigg	Labour
Dulwich	Robert Jenkins	Conservative
Dumfriesshire	Major Niall Macpherson	National Liberal and Conservative
Dunbartonshire East	Cyril Bence	Labour
Dunbartonshire West	Tom Steele	Labour
Dundee East	George Thomson	Labour
Dundee West	John Strachey	Labour
Dunfermline Burghs	Alan Thompson	Labour
Durham	Charles Grey	Labour
Durham North West	William Ainsley	Labour
== E ==
Ealing North	John Barter	Conservative
Ealing South	Brian Batsford	Conservative
Easington	Manny Shinwell	Labour
East Grinstead	Evelyn Emmet	Conservative
East Ham North	Reg Prentice	Labour
East Ham South	Albert Oram	Labour
Eastbourne	Charles Taylor	Conservative
Eastleigh	David Price	Conservative
Ebbw Vale	Aneurin Bevan	Labour
Eccles	William Proctor	Labour
Edinburgh Central	Thomas Oswald	Labour
Edinburgh East	George Willis	Labour
Edinburgh Leith	James Hoy	Labour
Edinburgh North	William Milligan	Conservative
Edinburgh Pentlands	John Hope	Conservative
Edinburgh South	Michael Hutchison	Conservative
Edinburgh West	Anthony Stodart	Conservative
Edmonton	Austen Albu	Labour
Enfield East	John Mackie	Labour
Enfield West	Iain Macleod	Conservative
Epping	Graeme Finlay	Conservative
Epsom	Peter Rawlinson	Conservative
Erith and Crayford	Norman Dodds	Labour
Esher	William Robson Brown	Conservative
Essex South East	Bernard Braine	Conservative
Eton and Slough	Fenner Brockway	Labour
Exeter	Rolf Dudley-Williams	Conservative
Eye	Harwood Harrison	Conservative
== F ==
Falmouth and Camborne	Frank Hayman	Labour
Farnham	Godfrey Nicholson	Conservative
Farnworth	Ernest Thornton	Labour
Faversham	Percy Wells	Labour
Feltham	Albert Hunter	Labour
Fermanagh and South Tyrone	Robert Grosvenor	Ulster Unionist
Fife East	Sir James Henderson-Stewart, Bt.	Liberal National
Fife West	Willie Hamilton	Labour
Finchley	Margaret Thatcher	Conservative
Flint East	Eirene White	Labour
Flint West	Nigel Birch	Conservative
Folkestone and Hythe	Albert Costain	Conservative
Fulham	Michael Stewart	Labour
Fylde North	Hon. Richard Stanley	Conservative
Fylde South	Claude Lancaster	Conservative
== G ==
Gainsborough	Marcus Kimball	Conservative
Galloway	John Brewis	Conservative
Gateshead East	Arthur Moody	Labour
Gateshead West	Harry Randall	Labour
Gillingham	Frederick Burden	Conservative
Glasgow Bridgeton	James Carmichael	Labour
Glasgow Cathcart	John Henderson	Conservative
Glasgow Central	James McInnes	Labour
Glasgow Craigton	Bruce Millan	Labour
Glasgow Gorbals	Alice Cullen	Labour
Glasgow Govan	John Rankin	Labour
Glasgow Hillhead	Tam Galbraith	Conservative
Glasgow Kelvingrove	Frank Lilley	Conservative
Glasgow Maryhill	William Hannan	Labour
Glasgow Pollok	Sir John George	Conservative
Glasgow Provan	William Reid	Labour
Glasgow Scotstoun	William Small	Labour
Glasgow Shettleston	Myer Galpern	Labour
Glasgow Springburn	John Forman	Labour
Glasgow Woodside	William Grant	Conservative
Gloucester	Jack Diamond	Labour
Gloucestershire South	Sir Frederick Corfield	Conservative
Gloucestershire West	Charles Loughlin	Labour
Goole	George Jeger	Labour
Gosport and Fareham	Reginald Bennett	Conservative
Gower	Ifor Davies	Labour
Grantham	Joseph Godber	Conservative
Gravesend	Peter Kirk	Conservative
Greenock	Dickson Mabon	Labour
Greenwich	Richard Marsh	Labour
Grimsby	Anthony Crosland	Labour
Guildford	Richard Nugent	Conservative
== H ==
Hackney Central	Herbert Butler	Labour
Hackney North and Stoke Newington	David Weitzman	Labour
Halifax	Maurice Macmillan	Conservative
Haltemprice	Patrick Wall	Conservative
Hamilton	Tom Fraser	Labour
Hammersmith North	Frank Tomney	Labour
Hampstead	Henry Brooke	Conservative
Harborough	John Farr	Conservative
Harrogate	James Ramsden	Conservative
Harrow Central	Patrick Bishop	Conservative
Harrow East	Anthony Courtney	Conservative
Harrow West	Sir Albert Braithwaite	Conservative
The Hartlepools	John Kerans	Conservative
Harwich	Julian Ridsdale	Conservative and Nat Lib
Hastings	Neill Cooper-Key	Conservative
Hayes and Harlington	Arthur Skeffington	Labour
Hemel Hempstead	James Allason	Conservative
Hemsworth	Alan Beaney	Labour
Hendon North	Ian Orr-Ewing	Conservative
Hendon South	Hugh Lucas-Tooth	Conservative
Henley	John Hay	Conservative
Hereford	David Gibson-Watt	Conservative
Hertford	Lord Balniel	Conservative
Hertfordshire East	Derek Walker-Smith	Conservative
Hertfordshire South West	Gilbert Longden	Conservative
Heston and Isleworth	Reader Harris	Conservative
Hexham	Rupert Speir	Conservative
Heywood and Royton	Tony Leavey	Conservative
High Peak	Hugh Molson	Conservative
Hitchin	Martin Maddan	Conservative
Holborn and St Pancras South	Geoffrey Johnson-Smith	Conservative
Holland with Boston	Herbert Butcher	Nat Lib & Conservative
Honiton	Robert Mathew	Conservative
Horncastle	John Maitland	Conservative
Hornchurch	Godfrey Lagden	Conservative
Hornsey	Muriel Gammans	Conservative
Horsham	Frederick Gough	Conservative
Houghton-le-Spring	Billy Blyton	Labour
Hove	Anthony Marlowe	Conservative
Howden	Paul Bryan	Conservative
Huddersfield East	Joseph Mallalieu	Labour
Huddersfield West	Donald Wade	Liberal
Huntingdonshire	David Renton	Conservative and Nat Lib
Huyton	Harold Wilson	Labour
== I ==
Ilford North	Tom Iremonger	Conservative
Ilford South	Albert Cooper	Conservative
Ilkeston	George Oliver	Labour
Ince	Tom Brown	Labour
Inverness	Neil McLean	Conservative
Ipswich	Dingle Foot	Labour
Isle of Ely	Harry Legge-Bourke	Conservative
Isle of Thanet	William Rees-Davies	Conservative
Isle of Wight	Mark Woodnutt	Conservative
Islington East	Sir Eric Fletcher	Labour
Islington North	Gerald Reynolds	Labour
Islington South West	Albert Evans	Labour
== J ==
Jarrow	Ernest Fernyhough	Labour
== K ==
Keighley	Marcus Worsley	Conservative
Kensington North	George Rogers	Labour
Kensington South	William Roots	Conservative
Kettering	Dick Mitchison	Labour
Kidderminster	Gerald Nabarro	Conservative
Kilmarnock	Willie Ross	Labour
King's Lynn	Denys Bullard	Conservative
Kingston upon Hull East	Harry Pursey	Labour
Kingston upon Hull North	Michael Coulson	Conservative
Kingston upon Hull West	Mark Hewitson	Labour
Kingston-upon-Thames	John Boyd-Carpenter	Conservative
Kinross and West Perthshire	Gilmour Leburn	Conservative
Kirkcaldy Burghs	Harry Gourlay	Labour
Knutsford	Walter Bromley-Davenport	Conservative
== L ==
Lanark	Judith Hart	Labour
Lanarkshire North	Margaret Herbison	Labour
Lancaster	Humphry Berkeley	Conservative
Leeds East	Denis Healey	Labour
Leeds North East	Keith Joseph	Conservative
Leeds North West	Donald Kaberry	Conservative
Leeds South	Hugh Gaitskell	Labour
Leeds South East	Alice Bacon	Labour
Leeds West	Charles Pannell	Labour
Leek	Harold Davies	Labour
Leicester North East	Lynn Ungoed-Thomas	Labour
Leicester North West	Barnett Janner	Labour
Leicester South East	John Peel	Conservative
Leicester South West	Herbert Bowden	Labour
Leigh	Harold Boardman	Labour
Leominster	Clive Bossom	Conservative
Lewes	Tufton Beamish	Conservative
Lewisham North	Christopher Chataway	Conservative
Lewisham South	Carol Johnson	Labour
Lewisham West	Henry Price	Conservative
Leyton	Reginald Sorensen	Labour
Lichfield and Tamworth	Julian Snow	Labour
Lincoln	Geoffrey de Freitas	Labour
Liverpool Edge Hill	Arthur Irvine	Labour
Liverpool Exchange	Bessie Braddock	Labour
Liverpool Garston	Richard Bingham	Conservative
Liverpool Kirkdale	Norman Pannell	Conservative
Liverpool Scotland	David Logan	Labour
Liverpool Toxteth	Reginald Bevins	Conservative
Liverpool Walton	Kenneth Thompson	Conservative
Liverpool Wavertree	Sir John Tilney	Conservative
Liverpool West Derby	John Woollam	Conservative
Llanelli	Jim Griffiths	Labour
Londonderry	Robin Chichester-Clark	Ulster Unionist
Loughborough	John Cronin	Labour
Louth	Sir Cyril Osborne	Conservative
Lowestoft	Jim Prior	Conservative
Ludlow	Christopher Holland-Martin	Conservative
Luton	Charles Hill	Liberal and Conservative
== M ==
Macclesfield	Arthur Vere Harvey	Conservative
Maidstone	John Wells	Conservative
Maldon	Alastair Harrison	Conservative
Manchester Ardwick	Leslie Lever	Labour
Manchester Blackley	Eric Johnson	Conservative
Manchester Cheetham	Harold Lever	Labour
Manchester Exchange	Will Griffiths	Labour
Manchester Gorton	Konni Zilliacus	Labour
Manchester Moss Side	James Watts	Conservative
Manchester Openshaw	William Williams	Labour
Manchester Withington	Sir Robert Cary, Bt.	Conservative
Manchester Wythenshawe	Eveline Hill	Conservative
Mansfield	Bernard Taylor	Labour
Melton	Mervyn Pike	Conservative
Meriden	Gordon Matthews	Conservative
Merioneth	Thomas Jones	Labour
Merthyr Tydfil	S.O. Davies	Labour
Merton and Morden	Humphrey Atkins	Conservative
Middlesbrough East	Hilary Marquand	Labour
Middlesbrough West	Jocelyn Simon	Conservative
Middleton and Prestwich	Sir John Barlow, Bt.	Conservative
Midlothian	James Hill	Labour
Mitcham	Robert Carr	Conservative
Monmouth	Peter Thorneycroft	Conservative
Montgomery	Clement Davies	Liberal
Moray and Nairn	Gordon Campbell	Conservative
Morecambe and Lonsdale	Basil de Ferranti	Conservative
Morpeth	Will Owen	Labour
Motherwell	George Lawson	Labour
== N ==
Nantwich	Robert Grant-Ferris	Conservative
Neath	D. J. Williams	Labour
Nelson and Colne	Sydney Silverman	Labour
New Forest	Oliver Crosthwaite-Eyre	Conservative
Newark	George Deer	Labour
Newbury	Sir Anthony Hurd	Conservative
Newcastle-under-Lyme	Stephen Swingler	Labour
Newcastle upon Tyne Central	Ted Short	Labour
Newcastle upon Tyne East	Fergus Montgomery	Conservative
Newcastle upon Tyne North	William Elliott	Conservative
Newcastle upon Tyne West	Ernest Popplewell	Labour
Newport	Frank Soskice	Labour
Newton	Frederick Lee	Labour
Norfolk Central	Richard Collard	Conservative & National Liberal
Norfolk North	Edwin Gooch	Labour
Norfolk South	John Hill	Conservative
Norfolk, South West	Albert Hilton	Labour
Normanton	Albert Roberts	Labour
Northampton	Reginald Paget	Labour
Northamptonshire South	Reginald Manningham-Buller	Conservative
Northwich	John Foster	Conservative
Norwich North	John Paton	Labour
Norwich South	Geoffrey Rippon	Conservative
Norwood	John Smyth	Conservative
Nottingham Central	John Cordeaux	Conservative
Nottingham North	William Whitlock	Labour
Nottingham South	William Clark	Conservative
Nottingham West	Peter Tapsell	Conservative
Nuneaton	Frank Bowles	Labour
== O ==
Ogmore	Walter Padley	Labour
Oldbury and Halesowen	Arthur Moyle	Labour
Oldham East	Charles Mapp	Labour
Oldham West	Leslie Hale	Labour
Orkney and Shetland	Jo Grimond	Liberal
Ormskirk	Douglas Glover	Conservative
Orpington	Donald Sumner	Conservative
Oswestry	Hon. David Ormsby-Gore	Conservative
Oxford	Montague Woodhouse	Conservative
== P ==
Paddington North	Ben Parkin	Labour
Paddington South	Robert Allan	Conservative
Paisley	Douglas Johnston	Labour
Peckham	Freda Corbet	Labour
Pembrokeshire	Desmond Donnelly	Labour
Penistone	John Mendelson	Labour
Penrith and the Border	William Whitelaw	Conservative
Perth and East Perthshire	Ian MacArthur	Conservative
Peterborough	Harmar Nicholls	Conservative
Petersfield	Hon. Peter Legh	Conservative
Plymouth Devonport	Joan Vickers	Conservative & Nat Liberal
Plymouth Sutton	Ian Fraser	Conservative
Pontefract	George Sylvester	Labour
Pontypool	Leo Abse	Labour
Pontypridd	Arthur Pearson	Labour
Poole	Richard Pilkington	Conservative
Poplar	Charles Key	Labour
Portsmouth Langstone	Geoffrey Stevens	Conservative
Portsmouth South	Jocelyn Lucas	Conservative
Portsmouth West	Terence Clarke	Conservative
Preston North	Julian Amery	Conservative
Preston South	Alan Green	Conservative
Pudsey	Joseph Hiley	Conservative
Putney	Hugh Linstead	Conservative
== R ==
Reading	Peter Emery	Conservative
Reigate	John Vaughan-Morgan	Conservative
Renfrewshire East	Betty Harvie Anderson	Conservative
Renfrewshire West	John Maclay	Liberal and Conservative
Rhondda East	Elfed Davies	Labour
Rhondda West	Iorwerth Thomas	Labour
Richmond (Surrey)	Anthony Royle	Conservative
Richmond (Yorks)	Timothy Kitson	Conservative
Ripon	Malcolm Stoddart-Scott	Conservative
Rochdale	Jack McCann	Labour
Rochester and Chatham	Julian Critchley	Conservative
Romford	Ron Ledger	Labour
Ross and Cromarty	Capt. John MacLeod	National Liberal
Rossendale	Tony Greenwood	Labour
Rother Valley	David Griffiths	Labour
Rotherham	Jack Jones	Labour
Rowley Regis and Tipton	Arthur Henderson	Labour
Roxburgh, Selkirk and Peebles	Charles Donaldson	Conservative
Rugby	Roy Wise	Conservative
Ruislip-Northwood	Petre Crowder	Conservative
Runcorn	Dennis Vosper	Conservative
Rushcliffe	Martin Redmayne	Conservative
Rutherglen	Richard Brooman-White	Conservative
Rutland and Stamford	Kenneth Lewis	Conservative
Rye	Godman Irvine	Conservative
== S ==
Saffron Walden	Rab Butler	Conservative
St Albans	Victor Goodhew	Conservative
St Helens	Leslie Spriggs	Labour
St Ives	Hon. Greville Howard	Nat Lib and Conservative
St Marylebone	Wavell Wakefield	Conservative
St Pancras North	Kenneth Robinson	Labour
Salford East	Frank Allaun	Labour
Salford West	Charles Royle	Labour
Salisbury	John Morrison	Conservative
Scarborough and Whitby	Sir Alexander Spearman	Conservative
Sedgefield	Joseph Slater	Labour
Sevenoaks	Sir John Rodgers	Conservative
Sheffield Attercliffe	John Hynd	Labour
Sheffield Brightside	Richard Winterbottom	Labour
Sheffield Hallam	John Osborn	Conservative & Liberal
Sheffield Heeley	Peter Roberts	Conservative & Liberal
Sheffield Hillsborough	George Darling	Labour
Sheffield Park	Frederick Mulley	Labour
Shipley	Geoffrey Hirst	Conservative
Shoreditch and Finsbury	Michael Cliffe	Labour
Shrewsbury	John Langford-Holt	Conservative
Skipton	Burnaby Drayson	Conservative
Smethwick	Patrick Gordon Walker	Labour
Solihull	Martin Lindsay	Conservative
Somerset North	Edwin Leather	Conservative
South Shields	James Chuter Ede	Labour
Southall	George Pargiter	Labour
Southampton Itchen	Horace King	Labour
Southampton Test	John Howard	Conservative
Southend East	Stephen McAdden	Conservative
Southend West	Paul Channon	Conservative
Southgate	Beverley Baxter	Conservative
Southport	Ian Percival	Conservative
Southwark	Ray Gunter	Labour
Sowerby	Douglas Houghton	Labour
Spelthorne	Beresford Craddock	Conservative
Stafford and Stone	Hon. Hugh Fraser	Conservative
Stalybridge and Hyde	Fred Blackburn	Labour
Stepney	Walter Edwards	Labour
Stirling and Falkirk	Malcolm MacPherson	Labour
Stirlingshire East and Clackmannan	Arthur Woodburn	Labour
Stirlingshire West	William Baxter	Labour
Stockport North	Norman Hulbert	Conservative
Stockport South	Harold Steward	Conservative
Stockton-on-Tees	George Chetwynd	Labour
Stoke-on-Trent Central	Sir Barnett Stross	Labour
Stoke-on-Trent North	Harriet Slater	Labour
Stoke-on-Trent South	Ellis Smith	Labour
Stratford-on-Avon	John Profumo	Conservative
Streatham	Duncan Sandys	Conservative
Stretford	Samuel Storey	Conservative
Stroud	Anthony Kershaw	Conservative
Sudbury and Woodbridge	John Hare	Conservative
Sunderland North	Fred Willey	Labour
Sunderland South	Paul Williams	Conservative
Surbiton	Nigel Fisher	Conservative
Surrey East	Charles Doughty	Conservative
Sutton and Cheam	Richard Sharples	Conservative
Sutton Coldfield	Geoffrey Lloyd	Conservative
Swansea East	David Mort	Labour
Swansea West	Hugh Rees	Conservative
Swindon	Francis Noel-Baker	Labour
== T ==
Taunton	Edward du Cann	Conservative
Tavistock	Sir Henry Studholme, Bt.	Conservative
Thirsk and Malton	Robin Turton	Conservative
Thurrock	Hugh Delargy	Labour
Tiverton	Derick Heathcoat-Amory	Conservative
Tonbridge	Richard Hornby	Conservative
Torquay	Frederic Bennett	Conservative
Torrington	Percy Browne	Conservative
Totnes	Ray Mawby	Conservative
Tottenham	Alan Grahame Brown	Labour
Truro	Geoffrey Wilson	Conservative
Twickenham	Gresham Cooke	Conservative
Tynemouth	Irene Ward	Conservative
== U ==
Ulster, Mid	George Forrest	Ulster Unionist
Uxbridge	Charles Curran	Conservative
== V ==
Vauxhall	George Strauss	Labour
== W ==
Wakefield	Arthur Creech Jones	Labour
Wallasey	Ernest Marples	Conservative
Wallsend	John McKay	Labour
Walsall North	William Wells	Labour
Walsall South	Henry d'Avigdor-Goldsmid	Conservative
Walthamstow East	John Harvey	Conservative
Walthamstow West	Edward Redhead	Labour
Wandsworth Central	Michael Hughes-Young	Conservative
Warrington	Edith Summerskill	Labour
Warwick and Leamington	John Hobson	Conservative
Watford	Frederick Farey-Jones	Conservative
Wednesbury	John Stonehouse	Labour
Wellingborough	Michael Hamilton	Conservative
Wells	Lynch Maydon	Conservative
Wembley North	Eric Bullus	Conservative
Wembley South	Ronald Russell	Conservative
West Bromwich	John Dugdale	Labour
West Ham North	Arthur Lewis	Labour
West Ham South	Elwyn Jones	Labour
West Lothian	John Taylor	Labour
Westbury	Robert Grimston	Conservative
Western Isles	Malcolm MacMillan	Labour
Westhoughton	Tom Price	Labour
Westmorland	William Fletcher-Vane	Conservative
Weston-super-Mare	David Webster	Conservative
Whitehaven	Joseph Symonds	Labour
Widnes	James MacColl	Labour
Wigan	Alan Fitch	Labour
Willesden East	Trevor Skeet	Conservative
Willesden West	Laurence Pavitt	Labour
Wimbledon	Sir Cyril Black	Conservative
Winchester	Peter Smithers	Conservative
Windsor	Sir Charles Mott-Radclyffe	Conservative
Wirral	Selwyn Lloyd	Conservative
Woking	Harold Watkinson	Conservative
Wokingham	William van Straubenzee	Conservative
Wolverhampton North East	John Baird	Labour
Wolverhampton South West	Enoch Powell	Conservative
Wood Green	Joyce Butler	Labour Co-operative
Woodford	Sir Winston Churchill	Conservative
Woolwich East	Christopher Mayhew	Labour
Woolwich West	Colin Turner	Conservative
Worcester	Hon. George Ward	Conservative
Worcestershire, South	Sir Peter Agnew	Conservative
Workington	Fred Peart	Labour
Worthing	Otho Prior-Palmer	Conservative
The Wrekin	William Yates	Conservative
Wrexham	James Idwal Jones	Labour
Wycombe	John Hall	Conservative
== Y ==
Yarmouth	Anthony Fell	Conservative
Yeovil	John Peyton	Conservative
York	Charles Longbottom	Conservative

== By-elections ==
See the list of United Kingdom by-elections.

== By nation ==
- List of MPs for constituencies in Scotland (1959–1964)
- List of MPs for constituencies in Wales (1959–1964)

== See also ==
- List of parliaments of the United Kingdom
- UK general election, 1959
- Category:UK MPs 1959-1964
