= Võrsna =

Village in Estonia

- Village
- Location in Estonia
- Coordinates: 58°23′39″N 22°45′08″E
- Country: Estonia
- County: Saare County
- Municipality: Saaremaa Parish

Population (2011 Census)
  - Total: 6

Võrsna is a village in Saaremaa Parish, Saare County, Estonia, on the island of Saaremaa. As of the 2011 census, the settlement's population was 6.

Journalist, writer and track and field athlete Aleksander Antson (1899–1945) was born in Võrsna.
