= Opinion polling for the 1959 United Kingdom general election =

In the run-up to the 1959 general election, various polling organisations conducted opinion polling to gauge voting intention amongst the general public. Such polls, dating from the previous election in 1955 to polling day on 8 October 1959, are listed in this article.

== Graphical summaries ==
UK opinion polling for the 1959 election Conservative Labour Liberal

== Polling results ==
In the run-up to the 1959 United Kingdom general elections, various organisations carry out opinion polling to gauge voting intention. Results of such polls are displayed in this article.

The date range for these opinion polls are from the 1955 general election til the 1959 general election.

=== 1959 ===
Survey End Date	Polling Organisation	Con	Lab	Lib	Lead
8 October	General Election Results	49.4	43.8	5.9	5.6%
8 October	Daily Express	49.1	45.4	5	3.7%
2-8 October	NOP/Daily Mail	48	44.1	7.9	3.9%
3-6 October	Gallup/News Chronicle	48.5	46.5	4.5	2%
3-6 October	Gallup/News Chronicle	46.5	47.5	5.5	1%
1-4 October	Forecasting/Daily Telegraph	49	46	5	3%
6 October	Daily Express	49.7	46.2	3.5	3.5%
2-5 October	NOP/Daily Mail	48.4	46.9	4.7	1.5%
5 October	Gallup/News Chronicle	47.2	47.2	5	Tie
29 Sep-2 Oct	Gallup/News Chronicle	45	47	7.5	2%
1 October	Gallup/News Chronicle	48.5	46.6	4.3	1.9%
29 September	Daily Express	49.5	44.5	5.5	5%
25-28 September	Gallup/News Chronicle	46	46.5	7	0.5%
24-28 September	NOP/Daily Mail	47.8	45.6	5.6	2.2%
24 September	Gallup/News Chronicle	49.7	44.8	4.9	4.9%
22 September	Daily Express	51.1	43	5.4	8.1%
21 September	NOP/Daily Mail	47.4	43.5	9.1	3.9%
17 September	Gallup/News Chronicle	50.6	43.9	4.9	6.7%
September	Gallup/News Chronicle	50.5	43.5	5.5	7%
15 September	Daily Express	50.8	42.7	5.9	8.1%
8-14 September	NOP/Daily Mail	51.2	42.9	5.9	8.3%
11-15 September	Gallup/News Chronicle	49	44.5	6	4.5%
September	Gallup/News Chronicle	48.3	41.9	9.3	6.4%
7-12 August	Gallup/News Chronicle	47.5	41.5	10	6%
23-27 July	Gallup/News Chronicle	46.5	43	9.5	3.5%
17-22 July	Gallup/News Chronicle	46	42	11	4%
4-7 July	Gallup/News Chronicle	45.5	41.5	12.5	4%
6-10 June	Gallup/News Chronicle	45	43.5	11	1.5%
10-15 April	Gallup/News Chronicle	44.5	44	10	0.5%
13-18 March	Gallup/News Chronicle	45.5	47	6.5	1.5%
February	Gallup/News Chronicle	43	47	8.5	4%
24-28 January	Gallup/News Chronicle	44.5	46.5	8.5	2%
10-14 January	Gallup/News Chronicle	45.5	45	8.5	0.5%

=== 1958 ===
Survey End Date	Polling Organisation	Con	Lab	Lib	Lead
November	Gallup/News Chronicle	46.5	42.5	10	4%
10-14 October	Gallup/News Chronicle	45.5	41.5	12	4%
19-23 September	Gallup/News Chronicle	44	43	13	1%
1-6 August	Gallup/News Chronicle	42.5	42	15	0.5%
20-25 June	Gallup/News Chronicle	39.5	43	17	3.5%
30 May-6 Jun	Gallup/News Chronicle	39	45.5	15	6.5%
3-7 May	Gallup/News Chronicle	34	47	19	13%
19-23 April	Gallup/News Chronicle	38	46.5	15	8.5%
14-19 February	Gallup/News Chronicle	36	44.5	18.5	8.5%
17-23 January	Gallup/News Chronicle	40	47.5	12	7.5%

=== 1957 ===
Survey End Date	Polling Organisation	Con	Lab	Lib	Lead
December	Gallup/News Chronicle	41.5	47.5	9.5	6%
22-26 November	Gallup/News Chronicle	38.5	49	12	10.5%
2-6 November	Gallup/News Chronicle	36	48.5	14.5	12.5%
4-8 October	Gallup/News Chronicle	37	49	13	12%
19-25 September	Gallup/News Chronicle	33.5	52	14	18.5%
29 Sep - 10 Oct	Gallup/News Chronicle	40.5	48.5	10	8%
16-27 August	Gallup/News Chronicle	41.5	49	8.5	7.5%
5-11 July	Gallup/News Chronicle	41.5	49.5	8	7%
24 June - 1 July	Gallup/News Chronicle	41.5	50	7.5	8.5%
12-16 April	Gallup/News Chronicle	41	51	7	10%
15-22 March	Gallup/News Chronicle	40	51.5	7	11.5%
February	Gallup/News Chronicle	42	48	8.5	6%
12-13 January	Gallup/News Chronicle	43.5	48.5	7	5%
10 January	Prime Minister Anthony Eden resigns and is replaced by Harold Macmillan				

=== 1956 ===
Survey End Date	Polling Organisation	Con	Lab	Lib	Lead
22-25 November	Gallup/News Chronicle	45	46	8.5	1%
10-11 November	Gallup/News Chronicle	46	45	8	1%
5 November	Jo Grimond elected Liberal Party leader				
October	Gallup/News Chronicle	42.5	47	9.5	4.5%
7-18 September	Gallup/News Chronicle	43	46.5	10	3.5%
16-24 August	Gallup/News Chronicle	43.5	49.5	6	6%
13-23 July	Gallup/News Chronicle	42	49	8	7%
19-27 May	Gallup/News Chronicle	43	47	9	4%
20-29 April	Gallup/News Chronicle	43	48	8	5%
24 Mar - 4 Apr	Gallup/News Chronicle	44.5	47.5	7	3%
11-20 February	Gallup/News Chronicle	44	46	9	2%
14-26 January	Gallup/News Chronicle	45.5	46.5	7.5	1%

=== 1955 ===
Survey End Date	Polling Organisation	Con	Lab	Lib	Lead
24 December	Gallup/News Chronicle	44.4	45.5	9	1%
14 December	Hugh Gaitskell elected Labour Party leader				
19-26 October	Gallup/News Chronicle	46.5	44.5	8	2%
9-19 September	Gallup/News Chronicle	48	44	7	4%
August	Gallup/News Chronicle	44.5	47.5	7	3%
2-13 July	Gallup/News Chronicle	47	43	9	4%
26 May	General Election Results	49.7	46.4	2.7	3.3%
