= 1959 Soviet Union regional elections =

Legislative election in the Soviet Union

- March 1959

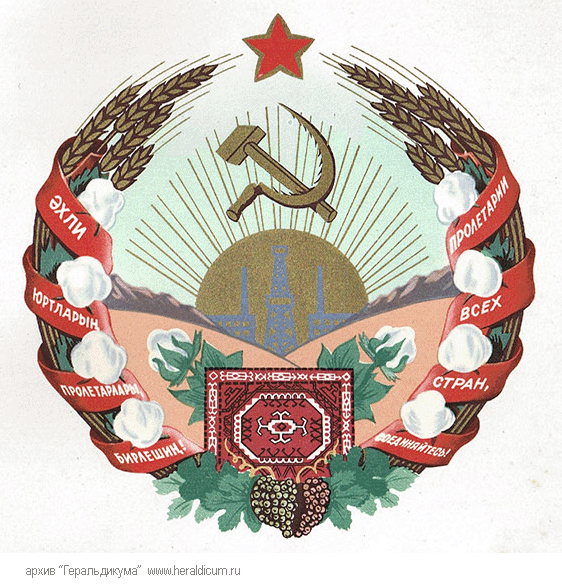
	First party	Second party	Third party
Leader	Imam Mustafayev	Kirill Mazurov	Johannes Käbin
Party	AzKP(b)	KPB(b)	EKP
Leader since	February 17, 1954	July 28, 1956	March 26, 1950
Seats won	325 / 325	403 / 403	125 / 125
	Fourth party	Fifth party	Sixth party
Leader	Vasil Mzhavanadze	Nikolay Belyaev	Jānis Kalnbērziņš
Party	CNG(b)	KPKaz(b)	LK(b)P
Leader since	September 20, 1953	December 26, 1957	August 25, 1940
Seats won	368 / 368	445 / 445	200 / 200
	Seventh party	Eighth party	Ninth party
Leader	Antanas Sniečkus	Nikita Khrushchev	Dzhuma Durdy Karayev
Party	CPL	CPSU	CPT
Leader since	August 15, 1940	September 7, 1953	December 14, 1958
Seats won	277 / 277	835 / 835	282 / 282

On 1 March 1959, elections were held for the Supreme Soviets of the Soviet Union's constituent republics.

According to Soviet law, 2,793,000 out of an eligible adult voting population of 136,416,000 were disenfranchised for various reasons.

1959 Soviet Union regional elections
Union Republic	Election date	Election name	Results
AzSSR		1959 Azerbaijani Supreme Soviet election	325 / 325
ArSSR		1959 Armenian Supreme Soviet election	Composition unknown
BSSR		1959 Byelorussian Supreme Soviet election	403 / 403
BSSR	March 15, 1959	1959 Estonian Supreme Soviet election	125 / 125
GSSR		1959 Georgian Supreme Soviet election	368 / 368
Kazakh SSR	March 6, 1959	1959 Kazakh Supreme Soviet election	445 / 445
borderless Kirghiz SSR	March 16, 1959	1959 Kirghiz Supreme Soviet election	Composition unknown
borderless Latvian SSR		1959 Latvian Supreme Soviet election	200 / 200
borderless Lithuanian SSR	March 1, 1959	1959 Lithuanian Supreme Soviet election	277 / 277
borderless Moldovan SSR		1959 Moldavian Supreme Soviet election	Composition unknown
RSFSR	March 1, 1959	1959 Russian Supreme Soviet election	835 / 835
Tajik SSR		1959 Tajik Supreme Soviet election	Composition unknown
Turkmen SSR		1959 Turkmen Supreme Soviet election	282 / 282
Uzbek SSR		1959 Uzbek Supreme Soviet election	Composition unknown
UkSSR		1959 Ukrainian Supreme Soviet election	Composition unknown
