= 1959 United Kingdom general election in Wales =

- 8 October 1959

All 36 Welsh seats to the House of Commons
- Turnout: 82.6% (▲3.0 pp)
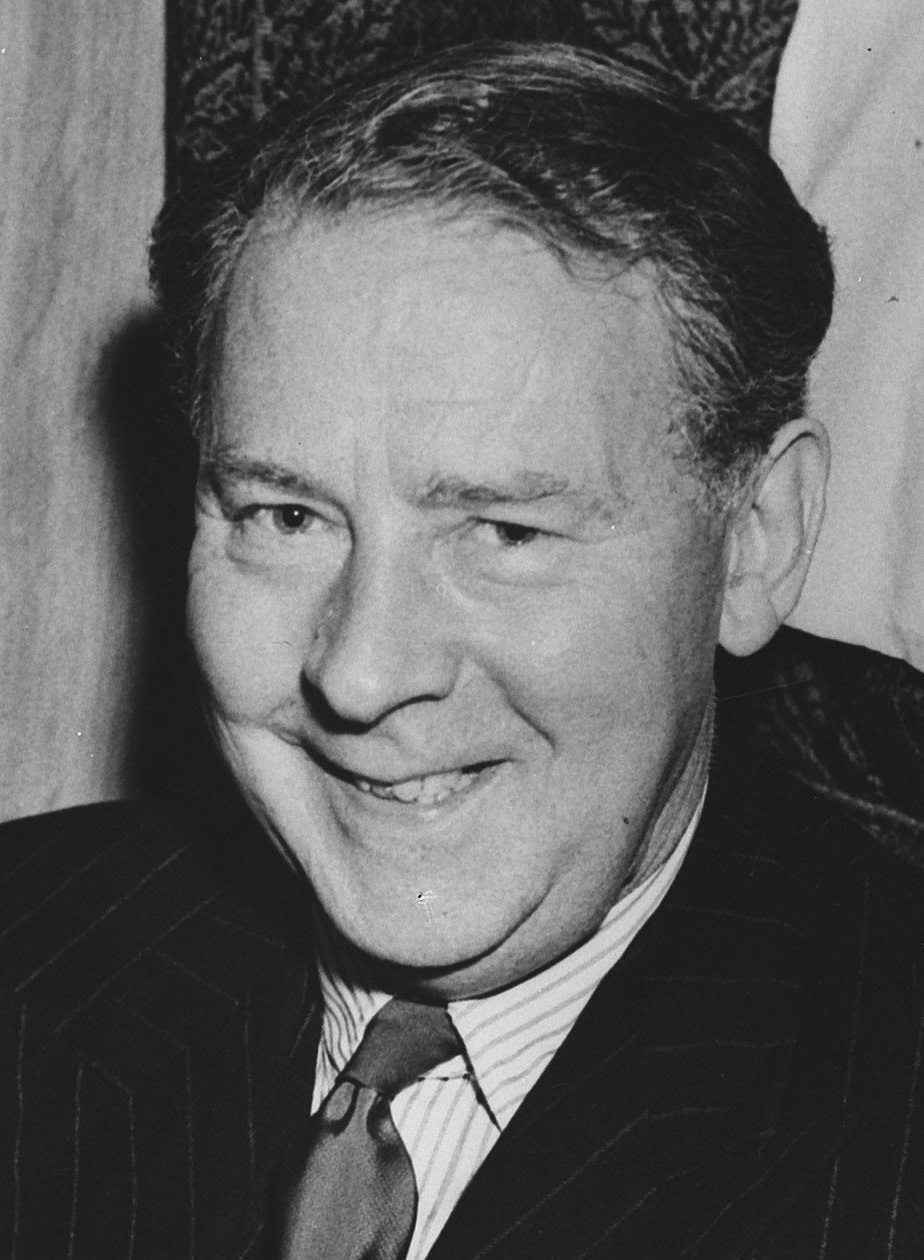

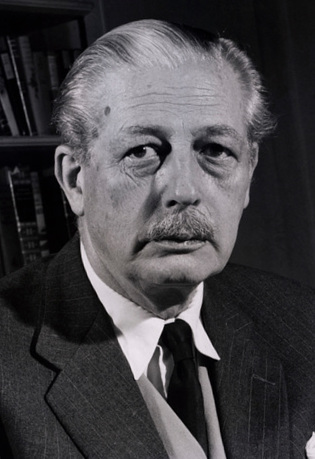

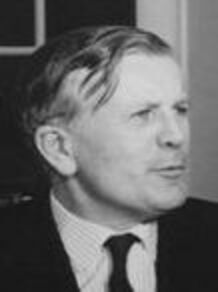
	First party	Second party	Third party
Leader	Hugh Gaitskell	Harold Macmillan	Jo Grimond
Party	Labour	Conservative	Liberal
Leader since	14 December 1955	10 January 1957	5 November 1956
Leader's seat	Leeds South	Bromley	Orkney and Shetland
Last election	27 seats, 57.6%	6 seats, 29.9%	3 seats, 7.3%
Seats won	27	7	2
Seat change	Steady	▲1	▼1
Popular vote	841,450	486,335	78,951
Percentage	56.4%	32.6%	5.3%
Swing	▼1.2 pp	▲2.7 pp	▼2.0 pp

On Thursday 8 October 1959, the 1959 United Kingdom general election was held in Wales, to elect all 630 members of the House of Commons, with 36 constituencies being in Wales.

The election saw the Labour party win the most votes and seats in Wales, retaining its overall 27 seats, though losing one seat and gaining another in this election.

The seat changes in Wales were minor during the election. The Liberal Party lost Caerfyrddin to the Labour Party in the 1957 Carmarthen by-election. The incumbent Labour Party candidate Megan Lloyd George, who was the first female Member of Parliament for a Welsh constituency, retained the seat with an increased majority, representing a gain when compared to 1955. Lloyd George had previously held the seat of Anglesey as a member and deputy leader of the Liberal Party.

At the same time, the Conservative Party gained Swansea West from Labour. The Conservatives retained all of its other seats. The National Liberal Party, which was under a constituency agreement with the Conservatives, retained Denbigh. However, the previously sitting MP, Garner Evans retired from Parliament in this election, after having been the sitting MP since 1950 United Kingdom general election. Instead, Geraint Morgan retained the seat for the party in this election. The Conservatives therefore gained an overall of one seat in Wales.

== Candidates ==
Below is a table summarising the candidates of the 1959 general election in Wales.

Affiliation	Candidates
Labour Party	36
Conservative and Unionist Party	31
Plaid Cymru	20
Liberal Party	8
National Liberal Party	3
Communist Party of Great Britain	2 (Note: The candidates that stood were James J. David in Neath and Annie Powell in Rhondda East.)
Independent	1 (Note: Candidate Stanley G. Worth stood in Cardiff North.)
Total	101

== Results ==
Below is a table summarising the results of the 1959 general election in Wales.

Party	Seats					Aggregate votes		
Party	Total	Gains	Losses	Net	Of total (%)	Total	Of total (%)	Change (%)
Labour	27	1	1	Steady	75.0	841,450	56.4	▼1.2
Conservative (Total)	7	1	0	▲1	19.4	486,335	32.6	▲2.7
Conservative	6	1	0	▲1	16.7	441,461	29.6	▲2.9
National Liberal	1	0	0	Steady	2.8	44,874	3.0	▼0.2
Liberal	2	0	1	▼1	5.6	78,951	5.3	▼2.0
Plaid Cymru	0	0	0	Steady	—	77,571	5.2	▲2.1
Communist	0	0	0	Steady	—	6,542	0.4	▲0.1
Independent	0	0	0	Steady	—	408	0.0	▼1.8
Total	36			0	100.0	1,491,257	100.0	0.0
Registered voters, and turnout						1,805,686	82.6	▲3.0

Popular vote
Labour	56.4%
Conservative	32.6%
Liberal	5.3%
Plaid Cymru	5.2%
Other	0.5%

Parliament seats
Labour	75.0%
Conservative	19.4%
Liberal	5.6%

== See also ==
- 1959 United Kingdom general election in England
- 1959 United Kingdom general election in Scotland
- 1959 United Kingdom general election in Northern Ireland
- List of MPs for constituencies in Wales (1959–1964)
