= 1959 Sioux Falls mayoral election =

- April 21, 1959; April 28, 1959

Candidate	Fay Wheeldon	Wendell H. Hanson	J. R. "Ray" Edgington
Party	Nonpartisan	Nonpartisan	Nonpartisan
First round	6,193; 32.82%	7,889; 41.80%	4,515; 23.92%
Runoff	8,988; 51.12%	8,594; 48.88%	Eliminated
Mayor before election
Fay Wheeldon
Nonpartisan
Elected mayor
Fay Wheeldon
Nonpartisan

The 1959 Sioux Falls mayoral election took place on April 28, 1959, following a primary election on April 21, 1959. Incumbent Mayor Fay Wheeldon ran for re-election. While former Governor Joe Foss was viewed as a potential candidate, he ultimately declined to run. Wheeldon placed second in the primary election, winning 33 percent of the vote to real estate agent Wendell Hanson's 42 percent. In the runoff election, however, Wheeldon narrowly defeated Hanson, winning re-election with 51 percent of the vote.

== Primary election ==
=== Candidates ===
- Wendell H. Hanson, real estate agent, former member of the City Board of Adjustment
- Fay Wheeldon, incumbent Mayor
- J. R. "Ray" Edgington, insurance agency owner
- Russell Adamson, freight checker and dispatcher, Minneahaha County Constable

=== Results ===
1959 Sioux Falls mayoral primary election
Party	Candidate	Votes	%
Nonpartisan	Wendell H. Hanson	7,889	41.80%
Nonpartisan	Fay Wheeldon (inc.)	6,193	32.82%
Nonpartisan	J. R. "Ray" Edgington	4,515	23.92%
Nonpartisan	Russell Adamson	275	1.46%
Total votes		18,872	100.00%

== General election ==
=== Results ===
1959 Sioux Falls mayoral runoff election
Party	Candidate	Votes	%
Nonpartisan	Fay Wheeldon (inc.)	8,988	51.12%
Nonpartisan	Wendell H. Hanson	8,594	48.88%
Total votes		17,582	100.00%
