= Fife Socialist League =

Defunct socialist party in Scotland

- Founder: Lawrence Daly
- Founded: February 1957
- Dissolved: 1964
- Split from: Communist Party of Great Britain
- Merged into: Labour Party
- Ideology: Socialism
- Political position: Far-left

The Fife Socialist League (FSL) was a minor left-wing political party which existed in Fife, Scotland from 1957 until 1964. It was associated politically with the British New Left and the journal New Reasoner, an antecedent of the present-day New Left Review. From 1960 to 1962, it published a monthly journal called The Socialist.

Willie Thompson, editor of Scottish Marxist, (Note: The Scottish journal of the Communist Party of Great Britain.) would later describe the FSL as the only significant example of industrial working-class participation in the British New Left.

== History ==
Informal discussions preceding the founding of the FSL began in June 1956 among discontented Communist Party of Great Britain (CPGB) members in Fife, where the CP had a strong base in coal mining communities. The FSL was officially founded at a meeting in February 1957. Its de facto founder Lawrence Daly, a former CP full-timer (Jan-Oct 1951) who held a number of trade union branch offices, including pit delegate, at Glencraig colliery, said its purpose would be to "conduct analytical, educational and propaganda work, free from the restrictions imposed by the Labour and CP machines".

The FSL's first foray into electoral politics came in the 1958 local elections, in which Daly was elected county councillor for Ballingry with 1,085 votes, beating the Labour candidate (525 votes) and the Communist candidate (197 votes). He had been defeated as the Communist candidate in the ward in two previous elections.

Buoyed by the experience, the party decided to contest the 1959 general election in the West Fife constituency, which had returned Willie Gallacher as a Communist MP between 1935 and 1950. Daly, running as the FSL candidate, polled 4,886 votes (10.7%), coming third place and beating Communist candidate William Lauchlan, who won 3,828 votes (8.4%).

Daly's election campaign was supported by several members of the editorial board of the New Reasoner, which proved controversial as the board had previously advocated work within the Labour Party. Writing in the New Reasoner, John Saville explained: "There were special conditions in West Fife which led us to support a candidate in opposition to the Labour Party (and to the Communist Party). Such conditions may well arise again, in some more critical political context. At the same time we felt no political conflict in supporting Lawrence Daly on the hand, and on the other taking an active part in our own local constituencies on behalf of the official Labour candidates."

In February 1960, the FSL began publishing its own monthly journal, The Socialist, which accepted contributions from outwith the party, such as from Jean McCrindle and the New Left club at the nearby University of St Andrews. A month later, the party issued a policy statement stating its support for "unilateralism, public ownership, industrial democracy and self-government for Scotland in Scottish Affairs".

However, the FSL's activities dwindled over the next two years. The final edition of The Socialist was published in May 1962, and by 1964, the FSL had decided to dissolve itself into the Labour Party "in the interests of unity and victory at the next General Election". Daly and another FSL county councillor, George MacDonald, subsequently became Labour councillors.
