= 1959 United Kingdom general election in Northern Ireland =

- 8 October 1959

All 12 Northern Ireland seats in the House of Commons
- Turnout: 65.9% (▼8.2 pp)
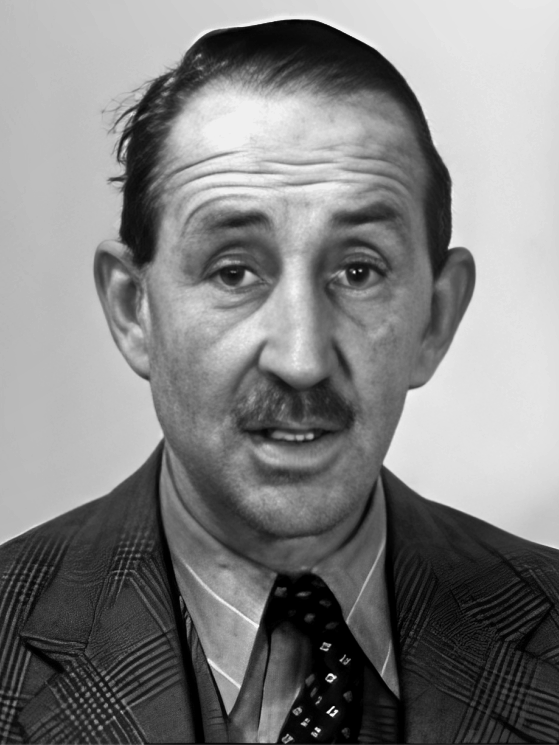
	First party	Second party
		SF
Leader	Sir Basil Brooke, Bt	Paddy McLogan
Party	UUP	Sinn Féin
Alliance	Conservative
Leader since	1943	1954
Leader's seat	Sat in Stormont	Did not stand
Last election	10 seats, 68.5%	2 seats, 23.6%
Seats won	12	0
Seat change	▲2	▼2
Popular vote	445,013	63,415
Percentage	77.2%	11.0%
Swing	▲8.5 pp	▼12.6 pp

On 8 October 1959, the 1959 United Kingdom general election was held in Northern Ireland, to elect all 630 members of the House of Commons, including the 12 Northern Ireland seats in single-seat constituencies using first-past-the-post.

The election took place towards the end of the IRA border campaign, which had seen the IRA launch a series of attacks and bombings against Northern Irish police and infrastructure. The launch of the campaign had in part been encouraged by the results of the last UK general election in Northern Ireland, which had seen Sinn Féin gain 2 seats, and receive nearly a quarter of the vote.

The Ulster Unionists won all the seats in region. This was a net gain from the result at the previous election, although they held all seats in the region before the 1959 election was called: in Fermanagh and South Tyrone, Philip Clarke was unseated by petition and Robert Grosvenor was declared elected to the seat; in Mid Ulster, George Forrest had been elected in a by-election as an Independent Unionist, but subsequently joined the Ulster Unionists.

In the election as a whole, the Conservative Party, which included the Ulster Unionists, led by Harold Macmillan as Prime Minister, continued in a majority government.

== Candidates ==
Affiliation	Candidates
Ulster Unionist Party	12
Sinn Féin	12
Northern Ireland Labour Party	3
Independent Labour Group	1
Ulster Liberal Party	1
Total	29

== Results ==
Party	Seats					Aggregate Votes		
Party	Total	Gains	Losses	Net	Of all (%)	Total	Of all (%)	Change (%)
UUP	12	2	0	▲2	100.0	445,013	77.2	▲8.5
Sinn Féin	0	0	2	▼2	—	63,415	11.0	▼12.6
NI Labour	0	0	0	Steady	—	44,370	7.7	▲2.2
Ind. Labour Group	0	New			—	20,062	3.5	New
Ulster Liberal	0	New			—	3,253	0.6	New
Total	12			0	100.0	576,113	100.0	0.0
Registered voters, and turnout						874,760	65.9	▼8.2

Popular vote
UUP	77.2%
Sinn Féin	11.0%
NI Labour	7.7%
ILG	3.5%
Ulster Liberal	0.6%

Parliamentary seats
UUP	100.0%

== MPs elected ==
Constituency	Party	MP
Antrim North	UUP	Henry Clark
Antrim South	UUP	Knox Cunningham
Armagh	UUP	John Maginnis
Belfast East	UUP	Stanley McMaster
Belfast North	UUP	Stratton Mills
Belfast South	UUP	David Campbell
Belfast West	UUP	Patricia McLaughlin
Down North	UUP	George Currie
Down South	UUP	Lawrence Orr
Fermanagh and South Tyrone	UUP	Robert Grosvenor
Londonderry	UUP	Robin Chichester-Clark
Mid Ulster	UUP	George Forrest

== See also ==
- 1959 United Kingdom general election in England
- 1959 United Kingdom general election in Scotland
- 1959 United Kingdom general election in Wales
