= 1959 Malayan local elections =

Local elections were held in the Federation of Malaya in 1959.

== City council election ==
=== George Town ===
Date: Electorate: Turnout:
Wards	Elected councillor	Elected party	Votes	Majority	Opponent(s)	Party	Votes
?
Jelutong	1.						
Kelawei	1.						
Sungei Pinang	1.						
Tanjong East	1.						
Tanjong West	1.						

== Municipal election ==
=== Kuala Lumpur ===
Date: Electorate: Turnout:
Wards	Elected councillor	Elected party	Votes	Majority	Opponent(s)	Party	Votes	Spoilt votes
?
Bangsar	1.							
Imbi	1.							
Petaling	1.							
Sentul	1.							

=== Malacca ===
Date: Electorate: Turnout:
Wards	Elected councillor	Elected party	Votes	Majority	Opponent(s)	Party	Votes	Spoilt votes
?
Bukit China	1.							
Fort	1.							
Mata Kuching	1.							
Tranquerah	1.							

== Town councils election ==
=== Alor Star ===
Date: Electorate: Turnout:
Wards	Elected councillor	Elected party	Votes	Majority	Opponent(s)	Party	Votes
?
Kampong	1.						
Pekan	1.						
Seberang	1.						

=== Bandar Maharani, Muar ===
Date: Electorate: Turnout:
Wards	Elected councillor	Elected party	Votes	Majority	Opponent(s)	Party	Votes
?
Maharani	1.						
Parit Stongkat	1.						
Sultan Ibrahim	1.						

=== Bandar Penggaram, Batu Pahat ===
Date: Electorate: Turnout:
Wards	Elected councillor	Elected party	Votes	Majority	Opponent(s)	Party	Votes
?
Gunong Soga	1.						
Jalan Sultanah	1.						
Kampong Petani	1.						

=== Bukit Mertajam ===
Date: Electorate: Turnout:
Wards	Elected councillor	Elected party	Votes	Majority	Opponent(s)	Party	Votes
?
	1.						
	1.						

=== Butterworth ===
Date: Electorate: Turnout:
Wards	Elected councillor	Elected party	Votes	Majority	Opponent(s)	Party	Votes
?
	1.						
	1.						

=== Ipoh-Menglembu ===
Date: Electorate: Turnout:
Wards	Elected councillor	Elected party	Votes	Majority	Opponent(s)	Party	Votes
?
Green Town	1.						
Menglembu	1.						
Pasir Puteh	1.						
Silibin	1.						

=== Johore Bahru ===
Date: Electorate: Turnout:
Wards	Elected councillor	Elected party	Votes	Majority	Opponent(s)	Party	Votes
?
Ayer Molek	1.						
Nong Chik	1.						
Tampoi	1.						
Tebrau	1.						

=== Kampar ===
Date: Electorate: Turnout:
Wards	Elected councillor	Elected party	Votes	Majority	Opponent(s)	Party	Votes
?
Central	1.						
North	1.						
South	1.						

=== Klang ===
Date: Electorate: Turnout:
Wards	Elected councillor	Elected party	Votes	Majority	Opponent(s)	Party	Votes
?
Klang North	1.						
Klang South	1.						
Port Swettenham	1.						

=== Kluang ===
Date: Electorate: Turnout:
Wards	Elected councillor	Elected party	Votes	Majority	Opponent(s)	Party	Votes
?
Gunong Lambak	1.						
Mengkibol	1.						
Mesjid Lama	1.						

=== Kota Bharu ===
Date: Electorate: Turnout:
Wards	Elected councillor	Elected party	Votes	Majority	Opponent(s)	Party	Votes
?
Kubang Pasu	1.						
Kota Lama	1.						
Wakaf Pasu	1.						

=== Kuala Kangsar ===
Date: Electorate: Turnout:
Wards	Elected councillor	Elected party	Votes	Majority	Opponent(s)	Party	Votes
?
Idris	1.						
Kangsar	1.						
Kenas	1.						

=== Kuala Pilah ===
Date: Electorate: Turnout:
Wards	Elected councillor	Elected party	Votes	Majority	Opponent(s)	Party	Votes
?
Bukit Temensu	1.						
Kampong Dioh	1.						
Pekan Lama	1.						

=== Kuala Trengganu ===
Date: Electorate: Turnout:
Wards	Elected councillor	Elected party	Votes	Majority	Opponent(s)	Party	Votes
?
Bukit Besar	1.						
Kuala	1.						
Ladang	1.						

=== Kuantan ===
Date: Electorate: Turnout:
Wards	Elected councillor	Elected party	Votes	Majority	Opponent(s)	Party	Votes
?
Central Town	1.						
Tanah Puteh	1.						
Telok Sisek	1.						

=== Pasir Mas ===
Date: Electorate: Turnout:
Wards	Elected councillor	Elected party
?
Lemal	1.	
Kampong Bahru	1.	
Pengkalan Pasir	1.	

=== Raub ===
Date: Electorate: Turnout:
Wards	Elected councillor	Elected party
?
Raub Australian Gold Mine	1.	
Raub Town	1.	
Sempalit	1.	
Tanjong Gadong	1.	

=== Segamat ===
Date: Electorate: Turnout:
Wards	Elected councillor	Elected party	Votes	Majority	Opponent(s)	Party	Votes
?
Buloh Kasap	1.						
Gemereh	1.						
Genuang	1.						

=== Seremban ===
Date: Electorate: Turnout:
Wards	Elected councillor	Elected party	Votes	Majority	Opponent(s)	Party	Votes
?
Lake	1.						
Lobak	1.						
Rahang	1.						
Temiang	1.						

=== Sungei Patani ===
Date: Electorate: Turnout:
Wards	Elected councillor	Elected party
?
Pekan Bahru	1.	
Pekan Lama	1.	
Rural	1.	

=== Taiping ===
Date: Electorate: Turnout:
Wards	Elected councillor	Elected party	Votes	Majority	Opponent(s)	Party	Votes	Spoilt votes
?
Assam Kumbang	1.							
Kota	1.							
Klian Pauh	1.							

=== Tanjong Malim ===
Date: Electorate: Turnout:
Wards	Elected councillor	Elected party	Votes	Majority	Opponent(s)	Party	Votes
?
Beirop	1.						
Idris	1.						
Malacca	1.						

=== Tapah ===
Date: Electorate: Turnout:
Wards	Elected councillor	Elected party	Votes	Majority	Opponent(s)	Party	Votes
Alliance 1 (9)
Kampong Datoh	1. Ariff Shah Buntal	Alliance (UMNO)	Unopposed				

Date: Electorate: Turnout:
Wards	Elected councillor	Elected party	Votes	Majority	Opponent(s)	Party	Votes
?
Kampong Datoh	1.						
Station Road	1.						
Temoh Road	1.						

=== Teluk Anson ===
Date: Electorate: Turnout:
Wards	Elected councillor	Elected party	Votes	Majority	Opponent(s)	Party	Votes
?
Changkat Jong	1.						
Denison Road	1.						
Pasir Bedamar	1.						

=== Temerloh-Mentekab ===
Date: Electorate: Turnout:
Wards	Elected councillor	Elected party	Votes	Majority	Opponent(s)	Party	Votes
?
Mentekab North	1.						
Mentekab South	1.						
Temerloh North	1.						
Temerloh South	1.						
