= Rudolf Sirge =

Estonian writer (1902–1970)

Rudolf Sirge (30 December 1902 – 24 August 1970) was an Estonian writer.

== Life and career ==
Rudolf Sirge was born in 1904 as the son of a sawmill worker and spent his childhood in various places in southern Estonia. His education was faltering. After four years of primary school, he was accepted into the teacher training college in Tartu on his second attempt in 1921, but he left after two and a half years without graduating. Sirge then spent a few years working in various places and in 1926 took a job as an errand boy for a publishing house in Tartu. There he received his high school diploma at evening school in 1928 and then enrolled at the Faculty of Economics at the University of Tartu. However, he only stayed at the university for one semester and did not study.

He began publishing in 1924. In 1927, two books of Sirge's stories were published (Alien Power and On the Highway). These publications were marked by the influence of naturalism and expressionism. The novel Peace! Of bread! Earth! of 1929, was about the events of the February and October revolutions in Russia. Critics called the novel still artistically immature but testifying to the writer's sympathy for the Bolsheviks. In his publications, he described the achievements of the USSR with Aleksander Antson in Modern Russia in 1930, he exposed the vices of bourgeois society in Modest Desires (1935) and warned against the danger of fascism in Black Summer. He showed the tragedy of an honest person in conditions of social injustice in Shame in the heart.

In the following years, Sirge worked as a publishing employee and reporter and undertook several trips around the world. In 1932 he wanted to sail around the world, but this was cut short the following year on the west coast of African. From 1937 to 1940 he was the press officer in the Estonian Foreign Ministry.

After Estonia came under Soviet rule in June 1940, he was appointed director of the Estonian Telegraph Agency by the Soviet authorities. After Hitler's attack on the Soviet Union and the occupation of Estonia in the summer of 1941, Sirge was imprisoned by the Germans for eight months. He was then able to await the end of the war in seclusion in the countryside. Sirge's most important novel was published in 1956, the extensive historical picture Maa ja rahvas was initially distributed over six issues of Looming magazine and then published as a book. It describes the events in the countryside in the first year of Soviet rule from a critical point of view. From 1946 he worked part time for the magazine, Looming and as an official of the Estonian Writers' Union. Rudolf Sirge died in 1970 in an ambulance on the way from Paunküla to Tallinn.

== Works ==
=== Novels ===
- Rahu! Leiba! Maad! (Tartu: Loodus 1929. 781 S.)
- Must suvi (Tartu: Noor-Eesti Kirjastus 1936. 217 S.)
- Häbi südames (Tartu: Eesti Kirjastuse Kooperatiiv 1938. 398 S.)
- Maa ja rahvas (Tallinn: Eesti Riiklik Kirjastus 1956. 636 S.; 2. Aufl. 1959, 3. Aufl. 1965, 4. Aufl. 1976)
- Häbi südames (Tallinn: Eesti Riiklik Kirjastus 1959. 287 S.)
- Tulukesed luhal (Tallinn: Eesti Riiklik Kirjastus 1961. 639 S.)
- Kolmekesi lauas (Tallinn: Eesti Raamat 1970. 152 S.)

=== Prose collections ===
- Võõras võim (Tartu: Sõnavara 1927. 94 S.)
- Maanteel (Tartu: Sõnavara 1927. 167 S.)
- Väikesed soovid (Tartu: Noor-Eesti Kirjastus 1935. 191 S.)
- Luhtunud lennud (Tartu: Eesti Kirjastuse Kooperatiiv 1937. 205 S.)
- Algava päeva eel (Tallinn: Ilukirjandus ja Kunst 1947. 312 S.)
- Ühise töö rütmis (Tallinn: Eesti Riiklik Kirjastus 1951. 253 S.)
- Kutsuv rada (Tallinn: Eesti Riiklik Kirjastus 1954. 491 S.)
- Tuultest sasitud (Tallinn: Eesti Raamat 1965. 255 S.)

=== Plays ===
- Äri huvides (Tallinn: Autorikaitse Ühing 1936. 44 S.)
- Must suvi (Tallinn: Autorikaitse Ühing 1937. 151 S.)

=== Non-fiction ===
- (with Aleksander Antson) Tänapäeva Venemaa (Tartu: Noor-Eesti 1930. 231 S.)
- Józef Pilsudski. Uue Poola looja. (Tartu: Eesti Kirjanduse Selts 1937. 159 S.)
- Väike, aga tubli (Tallinn: Ilukirjandus ja Kunst 1949. 85 S.)
- Mitmest kaarest (Tallinn: Eesti Riiklik Kirjastus 1964. 334 S.)
- Meretaguste juures (Tallinn: Eesti Raamat 1968. 228 S.)
