= Aleksander Antson =

Estonian author, athletics competitor and journalist (1899–1945)

Aleksander Antson (31 August 1899 – 21 September 1945) was an Estonian journalist, writer, and track and field athlete.

Aleksander Antson was born in Võrsna, on the island of Saaremaa. He trained as a school teacher for Estonian and Sport. Antson worked from 1916 as a teacher and journalist. 1925–26 he worked as an editor at Virulane, 1927–1930 at Rahva Sõna and 1931–1933 at Vaba Maa. Interested in political and social issues of the day, he was influenced by expressionism. With other like-minded intellectuals he formed a loose literary group under the name "Aktsioon", with whom he published three literary almanacs (1926, 1927, 1929) with his friend Valter Kaaver.

In the 1920s, he gained recognition as a political writer. His plays describe the horrors of war and the revolutionary struggle, and were among the popular stage works of the time. In the 1930s he turned to lighter subjects and authored two novels, and numerous satirical epigrams and travel stories (including one about the Soviet Union in 1930 with Rudolf Sirge). He was also active in the workers' sports movement. In the Estonian team, he participated in the 1924 Summer Olympics in Paris in the 1500 metres.

During the first Soviet occupation of Estonia in 1940–41 he was employed by the communist party newspaper Rahva Hääl (The People's Voice). Along with the likes of August Gailit, August Jakobson, Mait Metsanurk, and August Mälk, he expressed sympathy for Communism. With the German occupation of Estonia (1941–44) Antson was arrested and put in jail.

He died in 1945 in a car accident in Haapsalu.
