= 1959 United Kingdom general election =

- 8 October 1959

All 630 seats in the House of Commons 316 seats needed for a majority
- Opinion polls
- Registered: 35,397,304
- Turnout: 27,862,652; 78.7% (▲1.9 pp)
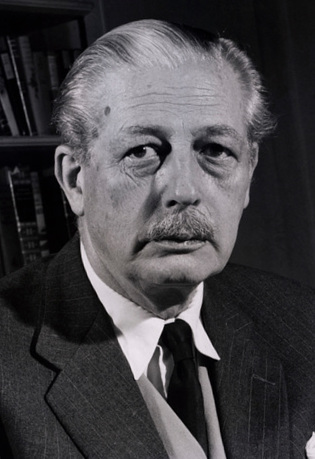

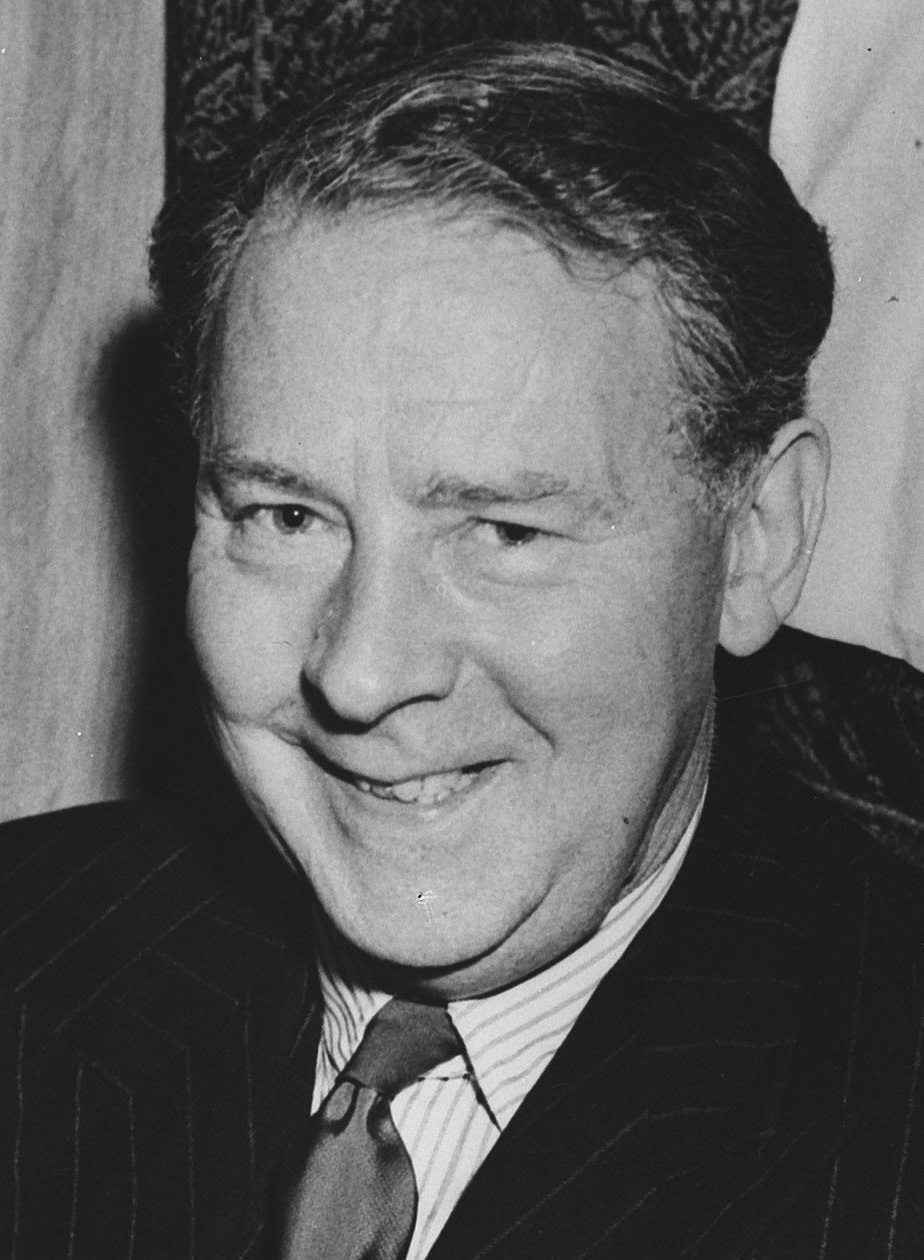

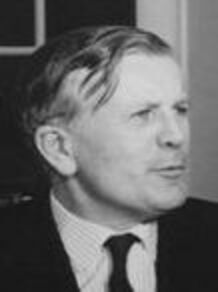
	First party	Second party	Third party
Leader	Harold Macmillan	Hugh Gaitskell	Jo Grimond
Party	Conservative	Labour	Liberal
Leader since	10 January 1957	14 December 1955	5 November 1956
Leader's seat	Bromley	Leeds South	Orkney and Shetland
Last election	345 seats, 49.7%	277 seats, 46.4%	6 seats, 2.7%
Seats won	365 (Note: The seat and vote count figures for the Conservatives given here include the Speaker of the House of Commons.)	258	6
Seat change	▲20	▼19	Steady
Popular vote	13,750,875	12,216,172	1,640,760
Percentage	49.4%	43.8%	5.9%
Swing	▼0.3 pp	▼2.6 pp	▲3.2 pp
- Colours denote the winning party—as shown in § Results

- Composition of the House of Commons after the election
Prime Minister before election
Harold Macmillan
Conservative
Prime Minister after election
Harold Macmillan
Conservative

A general election was held in the United Kingdom on Thursday, 8 October 1959. The Conservative Party under the leadership of incumbent prime minister Harold Macmillan won a victory with a majority of 100 seats. This was their third election victory in a row.

The Conservatives won the largest number of votes in Scotland, but narrowly failed to win the most seats in that country. They have not made either achievement ever since. Both Jeremy Thorpe, a future Liberal leader, and Margaret Thatcher, a future Conservative leader and eventually Prime Minister, first entered the House of Commons following this election.

== Background ==
Following the Suez Crisis in 1956, Anthony Eden, the Conservative Prime Minister, became unpopular. He resigned early in 1957, and was succeeded by Chancellor of the Exchequer Harold Macmillan. At that point, the Labour Party, whose leader Hugh Gaitskell had succeeded Clement Attlee following the 1955 general election, enjoyed large leads in opinion polls over the Conservative Party, and it looked as if Labour would win.

The Liberal Party also had a new leader, Jo Grimond, so all three parties contested the election with a new leader at the helm.

However, the Conservatives enjoyed an upturn in fortunes as the economy quickly recovered from the Recession of 1958 under Macmillan's leadership, and his personal approval ratings remained high. At the same time, the Labour Party's popularity suffered due to the rise of industrial disputes in the 1950s and controversies over the Campaign for Nuclear Disarmament. By September 1958, the Conservatives had moved ahead of Labour in the opinion polls. Parliament was dissolved on 18 September 1959.

== Campaign ==
All the three main parties had changed leadership since the previous election. The Conservatives fought under the slogan "Life is better with the Conservatives, don't let Labour ruin it" and were boosted by a pre-election economic boom. Macmillan very effectively "summed up" the mood of the British public when he said that most of the people had "never had it so good". Macmillan was very popular, and was described as a politician of the centre ground; in the 1930s he had represented a constituency in northern England (Stockton-on-Tees), which had experienced large-scale unemployment and poverty during the Great Depression. The first week of polling put the Conservatives ahead of Labour by over 5%, but this narrowed as the campaign continued. The Labour Party fought a generally effective campaign, with television broadcasts masterminded by Tony Benn under the umbrella of their manifesto entitled Britain Belongs to You, which accused the Conservatives of complacency over the growing gap between rich and poor. Labour's manifesto pledged to reverse reductions in welfare benefits, pensions, and National Health Service expenditure; renationalize the steel industry and road haulage; reform secondary education; expand consumer protections; and create the Welsh Office. It notably promised not to fully nationalise industries which were performing efficiently and profitably, pivoting away from its earlier emphasis on socialism towards welfare capitalism. Hugh Gaitskell made a mistake in declaring that a Labour government would not raise taxes if it came to power—even though the Labour manifesto contained pledges to increase spending; especially to increase pensions. Although Gaitskell argued revenue would be provided by economic growth, this led some voters to doubt Labour's spending plans, and is cited as a key reason for their defeat.

== Aftermath ==
Early on during election night, it became clear that the Conservative Party had been returned to government with an increased majority, performing better than it had been expected to. For the fourth general election in a row, the Conservatives increased their number of seats, despite experiencing a slight decrease in their share of the vote. However, there were swings to Labour in parts of north-west England, and in Scotland; where Scottish Labour had overtaken the Conservative-aligned Unionist Party as the largest single party in terms of seats, despite winning a slightly smaller share of the vote, thanks to overturning narrow majorities in several constituencies. Future Prime Minister Margaret Thatcher was elected to the House of Commons for the first time as the MP for Finchley, where she would represent until her retirement from politics 33 years later at the 1992 general election.

For Labour, the result was disappointing; despite appearing more united than they had in recent years under Gaitskell's leadership, the party suffered a third consecutive defeat. James Callaghan believed that the Conservatives increased their majority in part because working-class Labour voters were still angry at the party for opposing the Suez conflict. Many of both the Labour Party's supporters and opponents, including Prime Minister Macmillan himself, also blamed the Gaitskellite leadership for spending more time preparing to form a government with the assumption that they would win the election than actually campaigning or offering criticism of the Conservative Party's leadership. Political scientists Mark Abrams and Richard Rose blamed Labour's electoral losses from 1959 onwards on an "embourgeoisement" in which British voters identified increasingly with the middle class, leaving Labour's appeals to the working class less effective. Another key factor was the decline of support of younger voters after 1955, although older voters over the age of 65 increased support for the party in 1959 because of its pledges to expand pensions.

While the Liberal Party earned more than twice as many votes compared to the previous general election, this was largely the result of them nominating nearly double the number of candidates that they did four years prior; their average number of votes-per-candidate only slightly improved. Future Liberal Party Leader Jeremy Thorpe was elected to Parliament for the first time, as the MP for North Devon.

The Daily Mirror, despite being a staunch supporter of the Labour Party, wished Macmillan "good luck" on its front page following his election victory.

The BBC Television Service's election coverage, presented by Richard Dimbleby, was shown on BBC Parliament on 9 October 2009 to mark the fiftieth anniversary of the election and again on 9 October 2019 to mark the sixtieth anniversary.

The 1959 general election was the first election to be covered by commercial television in the United Kingdom. The ITV network provided election night coverage from the studios of Independent Television News (ITN) in London, with ITV given permission by the Independent Television Authority to use all of the ITV companies on air in 1959 for election links to the main studio in London. Ian Trethowan was the presenter for the ITV coverage.

== Results ==
=== Summary of seats returned ===
Party	Leader	MPs		Aggregate votes	
Party	Leader		Of total		Of total
Conservative and Unionist Party	Harold Macmillan	365	57.9%	13,750,875	49.4%
Conservative Party (Note: Conservative and Unionist Party results for England and Wales.)	Harold Macmillan	308	48.9%	11,479,459	41.2%
Unionist Party	James Stuart	25	4.0%	1,060,609	3.8%
National Liberal Party	James Duncan	20	3.2%	765,794	2.7%
Ulster Unionist Party	Basil Brooke	12	1.9%	445,013	1.6%
Labour Party	Hugh Gaitskell	258 (Note: Includes 16 Co-operative Party MP, as part of the Labour-Co-op alliance.)	41.0%	12,216,172	43.8%
Liberal Party	Jo Grimond	6	1.0%	1,640,760	5.9%
Independent Unionist	—N/a	1	0.2%	12,163	0.0%

=== Full results ===

Results of the October 1959 general election to the House of Commons of the United Kingdom
Party	Leader	Candidates	MPs					Aggregate votes		
Party	Leader	Candidates	Total	Gains	Losses	Net	Of total (%)	Total	Of total (%)	Change (%)
Conservative (Total)	Harold; Macmillan	625	365	30	10	▲20	57.9	13,750,875	49.4	▼0.3
Conservative (Note: Figure includes the Unionist Party and the Ulster Unionist Party under their nation affiliations with the Conservative Party.)	Harold; Macmillan	586	345	29	8	▲21	54.8	12,985,081	46.6	Steady
National Liberal	James; Duncan	39	20	1 (Note: Bristol North East.)	2	▼1	3.2	765,794	2.7	▼0.4
Labour	Hugh; Gaitskell	621 (Note: Includes 30 Co-operative Party candidates, as part of the Labour-Co-op alliance.)	258 (Note: Includes 16 Co-operative Party MPs, as part of the Labour-Co-op alliance.)	6	25	▼19 (Note: Includes ▼3 Co-operative Party MPs, as part of the Labour-Co-op alliance.)	41.0 (Note: Includes 2.5% for the Co-operative Party, as part of the Labour-Co-op alliance.)	12,216,172 (Note: Includes 675,199 for the Co-operative Party, as part of the Labour-Co-op alliance.)	43.8 (Note: Includes 2.4% for the Co-operative Party, as part of the Labour-Co-op alliance.)	▼2.6 (Note: Includes ▼0.7% for the Co-operative Party, as part of the Labour-Co-op alliance.)
Liberal	Jo; Grimond	216	6	1 (Note: North Devon.)	1 (Note: Carmarthen.)	Steady	1.0	1,640,760	5.9	▲3.2
Plaid Cymru	Gwynfor; Evans	20	0	0	0	Steady	—	77,571	0.3	▲0.1
Sinn Féin	Paddy; McLogan	12	0	0	2	▼2	—	63,415	0.2	▼0.4
Communist	John; Gollan	18	0	0	0	Steady	—	30,896	0.1	Steady
SNP	Jimmy; Halliday	5	0	0	0	Steady	—	21,738	0.1	▲0.1
Independent Labour Group	Frank; Hanna	1 (Note: Candidate John Joseph Brennan stood in Belfast West.)	0	New			—	20,062	0.1	New
Independent; Unionist	—N/a	1 (Note: Candidate David Robertson stood in Caithness and Sutherland.)	1	Did not stand in 1955		▲1	0.2	12,163	0.0	—N/a
Independent	—N/a	5	0	0	0	Steady	—	7,492	0.0	▼0.1
Fife Socialist League	Lawrence; Daly	1 (Note: Candidate Lawrence Daly stood in West Fife.)	0	New			—	4,886	0.0	New
Independent; Liberal	—N/a	2	0	0	0	Steady	—	4,473	0.0	Steady
Union Movement	Oswald; Mosley	1 (Note: Candidate Oswald Mosley stood in Kensington North.)	0	New			—	2,821	0.0	New
Independent; Conservative	—N/a	1 (Note: Candidate Harry W. Maynard stood in Birmingham Hall Green.)	0	0	0	Steady	—	1,955	0.0	Steady
Lancastrian; Party	Tom; Emmott	1 (Note: Candidate Tom Emmott stood in Nelson and Colne.)	0	New			—	1,889	0.0	New
National Labour	John; Bean	1 (Note: Candidate William Webster stood in St Pancras North.)	0	New			—	1,685	0.0	New
Fellowship	Ronald; Mallone	1 (Note: General Secretary of the Fellowship Party Ronald Mallone stood in Woolwich West.)	1	New			—	1,189	0.0	New
Ind. Labour Party	Fred; Morel	2	0	0	0	Steady	—	923	0.0	Steady
Socialist (GB)	Collective; Leadership	1 (Note: Candidate Jack L. Read stood in Bethnal Green.)	0	0	0	Steady	—	899	0.0	Steady
Alert Party	George; Forrester	1 (Note: Candidate George Forrester stood in Lewisham South.)	0	New			—	788	0.0	New
Total		1,536	630			0	100.0	27,862,652	100.0	0.0
Registered voters, and turnout								35,397,304	78.7	▲1.9

=== Votes summary ===
Popular Vote
Conservative	49.35%
Labour	43.84%
Liberal	5.89%
Others	0.91%

=== Seat summary ===
Parliamentary seats
Conservative	57.94%
Labour	40.95%
Liberal	0.95%
Independent Conservative	0.16%

== Transfers of seats ==
All comparisons are with the 1955 election.

- In some cases the change is due to the MP defecting to the gaining party. Such circumstances are marked with a *.
- In other circumstances the change is due to the seat having been won by the gaining party in a by-election in the intervening years, and then retained in 1959. Such circumstances are marked with a †.

From	To	No.	Seats
Labour	Labour (HOLD)	many	
Labour	National Liberal	1	Bristol North East
Labour	Conservative	25	Acton, Barons Court, Birmingham All Saints, Birmingham Sparkbrook, Birmingham Yardley, Brierley Hill, Bristol North West, Clapham, Cleveland, Coventry South, Derbyshire SE, The Hartlepools, Holborn and St Pancras South, Keighley, Lowestoft, Meriden, Newcastle upon Tyne East, Nottingham West, Reading, Rochester and Chatham, Rugby, Swansea West, Uxbridge, Wellingborough, Willesden East
Sinn Féin	UUP	2	Mid Ulster^{1}, Fermanagh and South Tyrone^{2}
Liberal	Labour	1	Carmarthen†
Liberal	Liberal (HOLD)	5	Bolton West, Cardiganshire, Huddersfield West, Montgomeryshire, Orkney and Shetland
National Liberal	National Liberal (HOLD)	16	Angus North and Mearns, Angus South, Bedfordshire South, Bradford North, Bradford West, Dumfriesshire, Fife East, Harwich, Holland with Boston, Huntingdonshire, Luton, Norfolk Central, Plymouth Devonport, Renfrewshire West, Ross and Cromarty, St Ives
National Liberal	Conservative	3	Denbigh, Newcastle upon Tyne North†, Torrington^{3}
Conservative	Labour	6	Ayrshire Central, Glasgow Craigton, Glasgow Scotstoun, Lanark, Oldham East, Rochdale†
Conservative	Liberal	1	Devon North
Conservative	Conservative (HOLD)	many	
Conservative	Ind. Conservative	1	Caithness and Sutherland*
UUP	UUP	10	North Antrim, South Antrim, Armagh, Belfast East, Belfast North, Belfast South, Belfast West, Down North, Down South, Londonderry
Speaker	Conservative	1	Cirencester and Tewkesbury

^{1} Sinn Féin winner in 1955 overturned on petition. The second-placed Ulster Unionist candidate was also overturned, by resolution of the House; eventually the 1956 by-election was held, which returned an Independent Unionist. This candidate later defected to the Ulster Unionists.
^{2} Sinn Féin winner in 1955 overturned on petition for criminal conviction. The second-placed candidate, an Ulster Unionist, was awarded the seat. He retained it in 1959.
^{3} Seat had been won by the Liberals in a 1958 by-election.

== See also ==
- List of MPs elected in the 1959 United Kingdom general election
- 1959 United Kingdom general election in England
- 1959 United Kingdom general election in Scotland
- 1959 United Kingdom general election in Wales
- 1959 United Kingdom general election in Northern Ireland
- List of MPs for constituencies in Scotland (1959–1964)
- List of MPs for constituencies in Wales (1959–1964)
