= 1959 Norwegian local elections =

== Debates ==
1959 Norwegian local election debates
Date	Time	Organizers	P Present I Invitee N Non-invitee						
Date	Time	Organizers	Ap	H	Sp	KrF	V	NKP	Refs
???	???	NRK	P Nils Hønsvald, Einar Gerhardsen	P John Lyng	P Per Borten	P Erling Wikborg	P Helge Rognlien	P Emil Løvlien	

== Result of municipal elections ==
Results of the 1959 municipal elections.

Party	Votes	%	Seats
Labour Party	729,503	43.74	6,694
Upolitiske, lokale og andre lister	110,380	6.62	2,106
Centre Party	129,777	7.78	1,874
Conservative Party	310,636	18.63	1,619
Liberal Party	148,799	8.92	1,445
Christian Democratic Party	124,350	7.46	1,128
Borgerlige felleslister	39,019	2.34	731
Communist Party	64,684	3.88	367
Småbrukere, arbeidere og fiskere	10,614	0.64	167
Total	1,667,762	100.00	16,131
Registered voters/turnout	2,314,255	–	
Source: Élections en 1959 pour les conseils communaux et municipaux
