= 1959 Cambodian constitutional referendum =

A referendum on suspending the provincial parliaments was held in Cambodia on 29 November 1959.

== Background ==
On 6 October, the government of Cambodia called for a referendum to decide who would hold power between the government and the Khmer Serei, which was led by Sam Sary and Son Ngoc Thanh. Norodom Sihanouk asserted that if he lost he would either agree to a trial or to go into exile, but that if he won the other leaders would be named outlaws.

== Results ==
Choice	Votes	%
For		99.95
Against		0.05
Invalid/blank votes		–
Total		100
Source: International Republican Institute

== Aftermath ==
The changes adopted in suspending the provincial legislatures would last beyond Sihanouk's abdication in 1970.
