= 1959 United Kingdom general election in England =

- 8 October 1959

All 511 English seats in the House of Commons
- Turnout: 78.9% (▲2.0 pp)
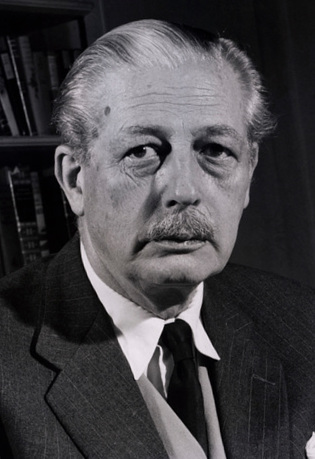

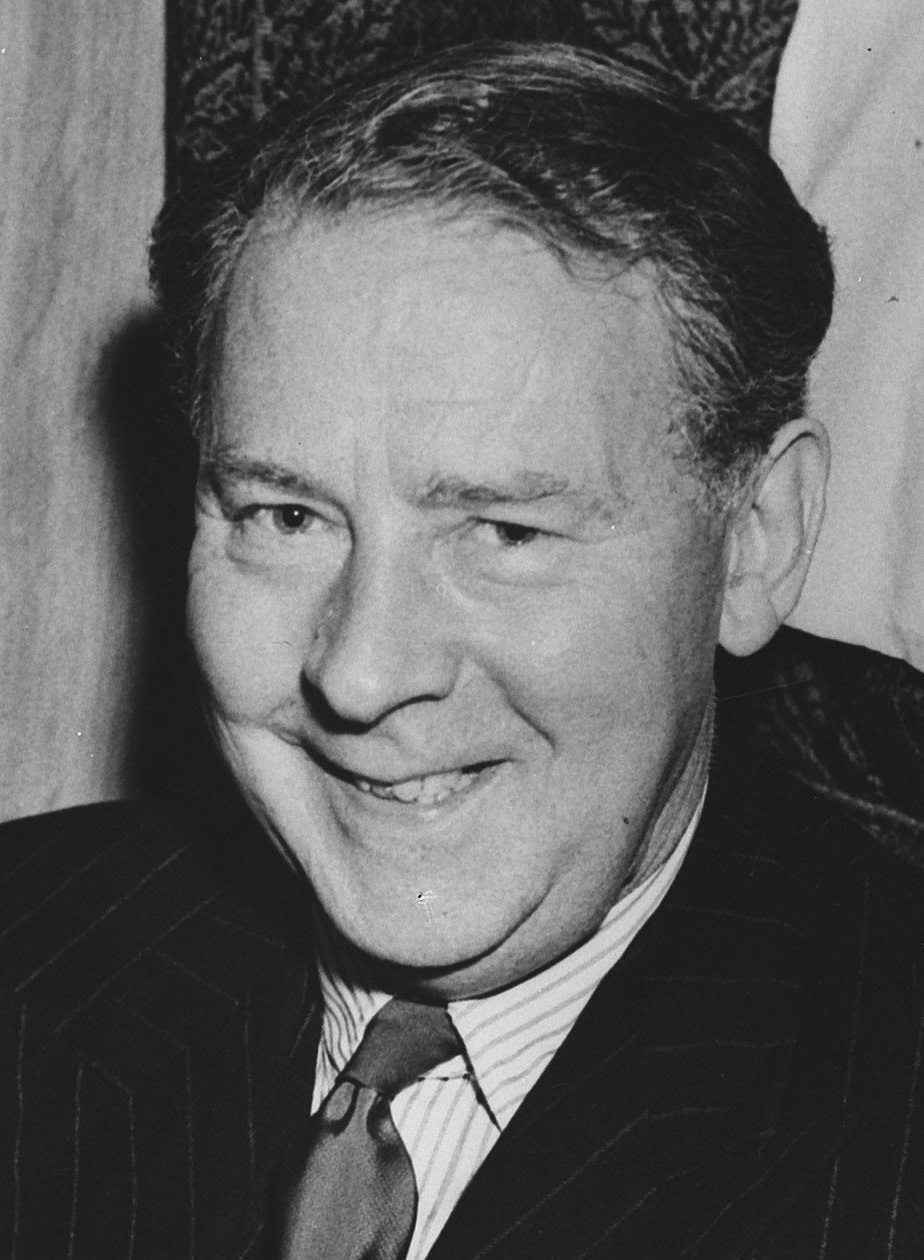

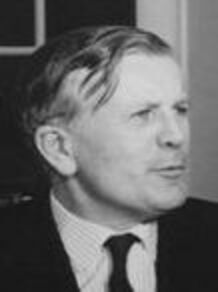
	First party	Second party	Third party
Leader	Harold Macmillan	Hugh Gaitskell	Jo Grimond
Party	Conservative	Labour	Liberal
Leader since	10 January 1957	14 December 1955	5 November 1956
Leader's seat	Bromley	Leeds South	Orkney and Shetland
Last election	293 seats, 50.4%	216 seats, 46.8%	2 seats, 2.6%
Seats won	315 (Note: Figure includes Speaker of the House of Commons Sir Harry Hylton-Foster in Cities of London and Westminster, elected as such just after the general election.)	193	3
Seat change	▲22	▼23	▲1
Popular vote	11,559,240	10,085,097	1,449,593
Percentage	50.0%	43.6%	6.3%
Swing	▼0.4 pp	▼3.2 pp	▲3.7 pp

On Thursday 8 October 1964, the 1959 United Kingdom general election was held in England, to elect all 630 members of the House of Commons, with 511 constituencies being in England.

As in the rest of the United Kingdom, in England, the Conservative Party along with allies, the National Liberal Party, registered a landslide victory over the Labour Party. This was the parties' third consecutive victory overall.

== Candidates ==
Below is a table summarising the candidates of the 1959 general election in England.

Affiliation	Candidates
Labour Party	511
Conservative and Unionist Party	484
Liberal Party	191
National Liberal Party	25
Communist Party of Great Britain	10
Independent	3
Independent Liberal	2 (Note: The candidates that stood were Simon Knott in Barons Court and Jack Norton in Devizes.)
Union Movement	1 (Note: Candidate Oswald Mosley stood in Kensington North.)
Independent Conservative	1 (Note: Candidate Harry W. Maynard stood in Birmingham Hall Green.)
Lancastrian Party	1 (Note: Candidate Tom Emmott stood in Nelson and Colne.)
National Labour Party	1 (Note: Candidate William Webster stood in St Pancras North.)
Fellowship Party	1 (Note: General Secretary of the Fellowship Party Ronald Mallone stood in Woolwich West.)
Socialist Party of Great Britain	1 (Note: Candidate Jack L. Read stood in Bethnal Green.)
Alert Party	1 (Note: Candidate George Forrester stood in Lewisham South.)
Independent Labour Party	1 (Note: Candidate William Henry Christopher stood in Walthamstow East.)
Total	1,234

== Analysis ==
The victory of the Conservative Party and its allies the National Liberal Party in England was even more remarkable than in the nation as it won over 120 more seats than Labour with just over 50% of the voteshare. It was the only election between the 1945 and 1979 general elections in which a party won over 300 seats in England. It was also the best performance of the Conservative Party in England since 1935 and conversely the worst for the Labour Party in England since 1935. Also, these elections marked the last time when the Conservative Party won over 50 per cent vote share in England.

=== Conservative Party ===
In terms of seats, the Conservative Party won Acton, Barons Court, Birmingham All Saints, Birmingham Sparkbrook, Birmingham Yardley, Brierley Hill, Bristol North West, Clapham, Cleveland, Coventry South, South East Derbyshire, The Hartlepools, Holborn and St Pancras South, Keighley, Lowestoft, Meriden, Newcastle upon Tyne East, Nottingham West, Reading, Rochester and Chatham, Rugby, Uxbridge, Wellingborough and Willesden East from the Labour Party.

In addition, future Leader of the Conservative Party and Prime Minister of the United Kingdom Margaret Thatcher in Finchley. Nicholas Ridley also entered Parliament in Cirencester and Tewkesbury, replacing retiring Speaker of the House of Commons William Morrison. Morrison would go onto serve as the Governor-General of Australia in 1960.

=== National Liberal Party ===
The National Liberals, however, declined slightly in vote share and seats. It retained its seats of Bedfordshire South, Bradford North, Bradford West, Plymouth Devonport, Harwich, Holland with Boston, Huntingdonshire, Luton, Norfolk Central, St Ives, Sheffield Hallam and Sheffield Heeley. The party gained Bristol North East, with candidate Alan Hopkins entering Parliament.

However, the party lost Newcastle upon Tyne North to its ally the Conservative Party. This was due to the Conservative's gain at the 1957 Newcastle-upon-Tyne North by-election, which was cause by the elevation of sitting MP Gwilym Lloyd George to a peerage. William Elliott retained the seat in this election unopposed by the National Liberals, representing a gain for the Conservatives. Elliot would retain the seat until 1983. Additionally, the National Liberals lost Torrington to the Conservatives. Following the elevation of the sitting MP to a peerage, the Liberal Party candidate Mark Bonham Carter won the seat in the 1958 Torrington by-election. However, Conservative candidate Percy Browne won the seat from the Liberals at this election, but it represented a gain from the National Liberals in comparison to 1955, again with the National Liberals not opposing the Conservatives.

With the two losses to the Conservatives, but with one gain to Labour, along with the Conservatives' wins across England along with its few losses, the alliance between the parties increased its seats by 22.

=== Labour Party ===
Conversely, the Labour Party lost several seats in England to the Conservatives and the National Liberals. However, the party gained Oldham East and Rochdale from the Conservatives. Herbert Morrison, who had served in several positions in the Attlee ministry, left Parliament after this election.

=== Liberal Party ===
The Conservatives also lost North Devon to the Liberal Party. Jeremy Thorpe, future leader of the Liberal Party, in the seat North Devon.

== Results ==
Party	Seats					Aggregate votes		
Party	Total	Gains	Losses	Net	Of all (%)	Total	Of all (%)	Change (%)
Conservative (Total)	315	27	5	▲22	61.6	11,559,240	50.0	▼0.4
Conservative	302	26	3	▲23	59.1	11,037,998	47.7	▼0.1
National Liberal	13	1	2	▼1	2.5	521,242	2.3	▼0.3
Labour	193	2	25	▼23	37.8	10,085,097	43.6	▼3.2
Liberal	3	1	0	▲1	0.6	1,449,593	6.3	▲3.7
Communist	0	0	0	Steady	—	12,204	0.1	Steady
Independent	0	0	0	Steady	—	5,753	0.0	Steady
Independent Liberal	0	Did not stand in 1955			—	4,473	0.0	—N/a
Union Movement	0	New			—	2,821	0.0	New
Ind. Conservative	0	0	0	Steady	—	1,955	0.0	Steady
Lancastrian Party	0	New			—	1,889	0.0	New
National Labour	0	New			—	1,685	0.0	New
Fellowship	0	New			—	1,189	0.0	New
Socialist (GB)	0	Did not stand in 1955			—	899	0.0	—N/a
Alert Party	0	New			—	788	0.0	New
Ind. Labour Party	0	0	0	Steady	—	183	0.0	Steady
Total	511			0	100.0	23,127,769	100.0	0.0
Registered voters, and turnout						29,303,126	78.9	▲2.0

Popular vote
Conservative	50.0%
Labour	43.6%
Liberal	6.3%
Other	0.2%

Parliament seats
Conservative	61.6%
Labour	37.8%
Liberal	0.6%

== By region ==
Note: the following tables indicate the results according to the regions of England which were established in 1994, based on the county boundaries established in the 1974 local government reforms. These regions were not used at the time for the purposes of this election.

=== East Midlands ===
Party	Seats					Aggregate votes		
Party	Total	Gains	Losses	Net	Of all (%)	Total	Of all (%)	Change (%)
Labour	20	0	3	▼3	52.6	—N/a	48.9	▲0.1
Conservative	18	3	0	▲3	47.4	—N/a	46.9	▼2.9
Liberal	0	0	0	Steady	0.0	—N/a	4.2	▲2.8
Others	0	0	0	Steady	0.0	—N/a	0.1	Steady
Total	38					—N/a		

=== East of England ===
Party	Seats					Aggregate votes		
Party	Total	Gains	Losses	Net	Of all (%)	Total	Of all (%)	Change (%)
Conservative	36	1	0	▲1	87.8	—N/a	51.2	▼1.6
Labour	5	0	1	▼1	12.2	—N/a	40.2	▼4.8
Liberal	0	0	0	Steady	0.0	—N/a	8.4	▲6.2
Others	0	0	0	Steady	0.0	—N/a	0.2	▲0.2
Total	41					—N/a		

=== Greater London ===
Party	Seats					Aggregate votes		
Party	Total	Gains	Losses	Net	Of all (%)	Total	Of all (%)	Change (%)
Conservative	60	6	0	▲6	58.8	—N/a	49.4	▲0.1
Labour	42	0	6	▼6	41.2	—N/a	43.3	▼4.5
Liberal	0	0	0	Steady	0.0	—N/a	6.9	▲4.3
Others	0	0	0	Steady	0.0	—N/a	0.4	▲0.1
Total	102					—N/a		

=== North East England ===
Party	Seats					Aggregate votes		
Party	Total	Gains	Losses	Net	Of all (%)	Total	Of all (%)	Change (%)
Labour	21	0	3	▼3	67.7	—N/a	56.7	▼1.0
Conservative	10	3	0	▲3	32.3	—N/a	41.9	Steady
Liberal	0	0	0	Steady	0.0	—N/a	1.5	▲1.1
Others	0	0	0	Steady	0.0	—N/a	0.0	Steady
Total	31					—N/a		

=== North West England ===
Party	Seats					Aggregate votes		
Party	Total	Gains	Losses	Net	Of all (%)	Total	Of all (%)	Change (%)
Conservative	44	0	2	▼2	53.0	—N/a	50.3	▼1.7
Labour	38	2	0	▲2	45.8	—N/a	44.9	▼0.9
Liberal	1	0	0	Steady	1.2	—N/a	4.6	▲2.5
Others	0	0	0	Steady	0.0	—N/a	0.1	Steady
Total	83					—N/a		

=== South East England ===
Party	Seats					Aggregate votes		
Party	Total	Gains	Losses	Net	Of all (%)	Total	Of all (%)	Change (%)
Conservative	57	2	0	▲2	93.4	—N/a	58.8	▼1.2
Labour	4	0	2	▼2	6.6	—N/a	33.6	▼4.2
Liberal	0	0	0	Steady	0.0	—N/a	7.6	▲5.6
Others	0	0	0	Steady	0.0	—N/a	0.0	▼0.2
Total	61					—N/a		

=== South West England ===
Party	Seats					Aggregate votes		
Party	Total	Gains	Losses	Net	Of all (%)	Total	Of all (%)	Change (%)
Conservative	37	2	1	▲1	82.2	—N/a	50.9	▼2.2
Labour	7	0	2	▼2	15.6	—N/a	34.2	▼3.9
Liberal	1	1	0	▲1	2.2	—N/a	14.7	▲6.5
Others	0	0	0	Steady	0.0	—N/a	0.1	▼0.5
Total	45					—N/a		

=== West Midlands ===
Party	Seats					Aggregate votes		
Party	Total	Gains	Losses	Net	Of all (%)	Total	Of all (%)	Change (%)
Conservative	29	7	0	▲7	53.7	—N/a	50.7	▲1.5
Labour	25	0	7	▼7	46.3	—N/a	45.9	▼3.5
Liberal	0	0	0	Steady	0.0	—N/a	3.2	▲2.0
Others	0	0	0	Steady	0.0	—N/a	0.2	Steady
Total	54					—N/a		

=== Yorkshire and the Humber ===
Party	Seats					Aggregate votes		
Party	Total	Gains	Losses	Net	Of all (%)	Total	Of all (%)	Change (%)
Labour	31	0	1	▼1	55.4	—N/a	50.2	▼2.1
Conservative	24	1	0	▲1	42.9	—N/a	44.8	▲0.5
Liberal	1	0	0	Steady	1.8	—N/a	4.9	▲1.6
Others	0	0	0	Steady	0.0	—N/a	0.1	Steady
Total	56					—N/a		

== See also ==
- 1959 United Kingdom general election in Northern Ireland
- 1959 United Kingdom general election in Scotland
- 1959 United Kingdom general election in Wales
