= 1959 Estonian Supreme Soviet election =

1959 elections in Estonian SSR

Elections to the Supreme Soviet of the Estonian SSR were held on 15 March 1959. As was the case with past elections of the Estonian SSR, the Bloc of Communists and Non-Party Candidates was the only party permitted to contest the elections, and won all 125 seats.

== Results ==
Party	Votes	%	Seats
Bloc of Communists and Non-Party Candidates		99.53	125
Against		0.47	–
Total			125
Registered voters/turnout		99.59	
Source: Liivik

== See also ==
- List of members of the Supreme Soviet of the Estonian Soviet Socialist Republic, 1959–1963
