= 1959 Israeli municipal elections =

Local elections in several municipalities and councils in Israel

Municipal elections took place in Israel on 3 November 1959, alongside elections to the fourth Knesset.

== Elections by Municipality ==
=== In Cities ===
In Jerusalem, Mapai, led by Incumbent Mayor Mordechai Ish-Shalom won eight seats, while the second biggest party, Herut, won four. As a result, Ish-Shalom was re-elected. Maki, the Religious Worker list, Mapam and the General Zionists did not win seats on the council.

In Tel Aviv, Mapai, led by Minister of Labor Mordechai Namir, were opposed by the General Zionists, led by Chaim Levanon. Mapai won 11 seats on the City Council, while the General Zionists won six. Mapai formed a municipal government with Agudat Yisrael, the Progressive Party, Ahdut HaAvoda, Mapam and Mafdal, leading to Namir becoming Mayor.

Mapai formed municipal governments in Haifa (led by incumbent Mayor Abba Hushi), Ashkelon, Hadera, Netanya, Beersheba, Tiberias, Lod, Bat Yam and Holon.

=== In Regional Councils ===
In Even Yehuda, a local list, led by Yehiel Zeliner, formed a local government. In Gedera, the Incumbent leader of the Regional Council, a member of a local list, formed a rotation government with Mapai. In Yesud HaMa'ala, all five seats on the local council were manned by two local lists. In Ofakim, Mapai formed a government with Mapam.

In Gan Yavne, Religious parties defeated Mapai, winning five seats to Mapai's four.
