= List of MPs for constituencies in Wales (1959–1964) =

This is a list of members of Parliament (MPs) elected to the House of Commons of the United Kingdom by Welsh constituencies for the Forty-Second Parliament of the United Kingdom (1959–1964).

Most MPs elected for Welsh constituencies at the 1959 United Kingdom general election, held on 8 October 1959, served a full term, but there were three by-elections.

The list is sorted by the name of the MP.

== Composition ==
Affiliation	Members
Labour Party	27
Conservative Party	6
Welsh Liberal Party	2
National Liberal Party	1
Total	36

== MPs ==
MP	Constituency	Party	In constituency since
Leo Abse	Pontypool	Labour Party	1958 by-election
Aneurin Bevan	Ebbw Vale	Labour Party	1929
Nigel Birch	West Flintshire	Conservative Party	1950
Roderic Bowen	Cardiganshire	Liberal Party	1945
Donald Box	Cardiff North	Conservative Party	1959
James Callaghan	Cardiff South East	Labour Party	1945
Clement Davies	Montgomeryshire	Liberal Party	1929
Elfed Davies	Rhondda East	Labour Party	1959
Ifor Davies	Gower	Labour Party	1959
S. O. Davies	Merthyr Tydfil	Labour Party	1934 by-election
Desmond Donnelly	Pembrokeshire	Labour Party	1950
Ness Edwards	Caerphilly	Labour Party	1939 by-election
Harold Finch	Bedwellty	Labour Party	1950
Raymond Gower	Barry	Conservative Party	1951
Jim Griffiths	Llanelli	Labour Party	1936 by-election
Cledwyn Hughes	Anglesey	Labour Party	1951
Idwal Jones	Wrexham	Labour Party	1955
Thomas Jones	Merioneth	Labour Party	1951
Megan Lloyd George	Carmarthen	Labour Party	1957 by-election
Geraint Morgan	Denbigh	National Liberal Party	1959
John Morris	Aberavon	Labour Party	1959
David Mort	Swansea East	Labour Party	1940 by-election
Walter Padley	Ogmore	Labour Party	1950
Arthur Pearson	Pontypridd	Labour Party	1938 by-election
Arthur Probert	Aberdare	Labour Party	1954 by-election
Hugh Rees	Swansea West	Conservative Party	1959
Goronwy Roberts	Caernarfon	Labour Party	1950
Frank Soskice	Newport	Labour Party	1956 by-election
George Thomas	Cardiff West	Labour Party	1945
Iorwerth Thomas	Rhondda West	Labour Party	1950
Peter Thomas	Conwy	Conservative Party	1951
Peter Thorneycroft	Monmouth	Conservative Party	1945 by-election
Tudor Watkins	Brecon and Radnor	Labour Party	1945
D. J. Williams	Neath	Labour Party	1945 by-election
Llywelyn Williams	Abertillery	Labour Party	1950 by-election
Eirene White	East Flintshire	Labour Party	1950

== By-elections ==
There were three by-elections during this period:

- 1960 Ebbw Vale was won by Labour MP Michael Foot
- 1962 Montgomeryshire was won by Liberal MP Emlyn Hooson
- 1963 Swansea East was won by Labour MP Neil McBride

== See also ==
- 1959 United Kingdom general election
