= List of MPs for constituencies in Wales (1964–1966) =

This is a list of members of Parliament (MPs) elected to the House of Commons of the United Kingdom by Welsh constituencies for the Forty-Third Parliament of the United Kingdom (1964–1966).

Most MPs elected for Welsh constituencies at the 1964 United Kingdom general election, held on 15 October 1964, served a full term, apart from Labour MP Llywelyn Williams who died in 1965.

The list is sorted by the name of the MP.

== Composition ==
Affiliation	Members
Labour Party	28
Conservative Party	6
Liberal Party	2
Total	36

== MPs ==
MP	Constituency	Party	In constituency since
Leo Abse	Pontypool	Labour Party	1958 by-election
Nigel Birch	West Flintshire	Conservative Party	1950
Roderic Bowen	Cardiganshire	Liberal Party	1945
Donald Box	Cardiff North	Conservative Party	1959
James Callaghan	Cardiff South East	Labour Party	1945
Donald Coleman	Neath	Labour Party	1964
Elfed Davies	Rhondda East	Labour Party	1959
Ifor Davies	Gower	Labour Party	1959
S. O. Davies	Merthyr Tydfil	Labour Party	1934 by-election
Desmond Donnelly	Pembrokeshire	Labour Party	1950
Ness Edwards	Caerphilly	Labour Party	1939 by-election
Harold Finch	Bedwellty	Labour Party	1950
Michael Foot	Ebbw Vale	Labour Party	1960 by-election
Raymond Gower	Barry	Conservative Party	1951
Jim Griffiths	Llanelli	Labour Party	1936 by-election
Emlyn Hooson	Montgomeryshire	Liberal Party	1962 by-election
Cledwyn Hughes	Anglesey	Labour Party	1951
Idwal Jones	Wrexham	Labour Party	1955
Thomas Jones	Merioneth	Labour Party	1951
Megan Lloyd George	Carmarthen	Labour Party	1957 by-election
Neil McBride	Swansea East	Labour Party	1963 by-election
Geraint Morgan	Denbigh	Conservative Party	1959
John Morris	Abervaon	Labour Party	1959
Walter Padley	Ogmore	Labour Party	1950
Arthur Pearson	Pontypridd	Labour Party	1938 by-election
Arthur Probert	Aberdare	Labour Party	1954 by-election
Alan Williams	Swansea West	Labour Party	1964
Goronwy Roberts	Caernarfon	Labour Party	1950
Frank Soskice	Newport	Labour Party	1956 by-election
George Thomas	Cardiff West	Labour Party	1945
Iorwerth Thomas	Rhondda West	Labour Party	1950
Peter Thomas	Conwy	Conservative Party	1951
Peter Thorneycroft	Monmouth	Conservative Party	1945 by-election
Tudor Watkins	Brecon and Radnor	Labour Party	1945
Llywelyn Williams	Abertillery	Labour Party	1950 by-election
Eirene White	East Flintshire	Labour Party	1950

== By-elections ==
There was one by-election during this period:

- 1965 Abertillery by-election was won by Labour MP Clifford Williams

== See also ==
- 1964 United Kingdom general election
