= List of MPs for constituencies in Scotland (1964–1966) =

- Colours on map indicate the party allegiance of each constituency's MP.

This is a list of the 71 members of Parliament (MPs) elected to the House of Commons of the United Kingdom by Scottish constituencies for the Forty-third parliament of the United Kingdom (1964–1966) at the 1964 United Kingdom general election.

== Composition ==
Affiliation	Members
Labour Party	43
Conservative and Unionist Party	24
Liberal	4

== Members ==
Constituency	MP	Party	Notes
Aberdeen North	Hector Hughes	Labour Party	
Aberdeen South	Priscilla Buchan	Unionist Party	
Argyll	Michael Noble	Unionist Party	
Ayr	George Younger	Unionist Party	
Banffshire	Wilfred Baker	Conservative Party	
Berwick and East Lothian	William Anstruther-Gray	Unionist Party	
Bothwell	James Hamilton	Labour Party	
Bute and North Ayrshire	Fitzroy Maclean	Unionist Party	
Caithness and Sutherland	George Mackie	Liberal Party	
Central Ayrshire	Archie Manuel	Labour Party	
Clackmannan and East Stirlingshire	Arthur Woodburn	Labour Party	
Coatbridge and Airdrie	James Dempsey	Labour Party	
Dumfriesshire	Hector Monro	Conservative Party	
Dundee East	George Thomson	Labour Party	
Dundee West	Peter Doig	Labour Party	
Dunfermline Burghs	Adam Hunter	Labour Party	
East Aberdeenshire	Patrick Wolrige-Gordon	Conservative Party	
East Dunbartonshire	Cyril Bence	Labour Party	
East Fife	John Gilmour	Unionist Party	
East Renfrewshire	Betty Harvie Anderson	Unionist Party	
Edinburgh Central	Thomas Oswald	Labour Party	
Edinburgh East	George Willis	Labour Party	
Edinburgh Leith	James Hoy	Labour Party	
Edinburgh North	Lord Dalkeith	Unionist Party	
Edinburgh Pentlands	Norman Wylie	Unionist Party	
Edinburgh South	Michael Clark Hutchison	Unionist Party	
Edinburgh West	Anthony Stodart	Unionist Party	
Galloway	John Brewis	Unionist Party	
Glasgow Bridgeton	James Bennett	Labour Party	
Glasgow Cathcart	Teddy Taylor	Unionist Party	
Glasgow Central	James McInnes	Labour Party	
Glasgow Craigton	Bruce Millan	Labour Party	
Glasgow Gorbals	Alice Cullen	Labour Party	
Glasgow Govan	John Rankin	Labour Co-operative	
Glasgow Hillhead	Tam Galbraith	Unionist Party	
Glasgow Kelvingrove	Maurice Miller	Labour Party	
Glasgow Maryhill	Willie Hannan	Labour Party	
Glasgow Pollok	Alex Garrow	Labour Party	
Glasgow Provan	Hugh Brown	Labour Party	
Glasgow Scotstoun	Willie Small	Labour Party	
Glasgow Shettleston	Myer Galpern	Labour Party	
Glasgow Springburn	Dick Buchanan	Labour Party	
Glasgow Woodside	Neil George Carmichael	Labour Party	
Greenock	Dickson Mabon	Labour Party	
Hamilton	Tom Fraser	Labour Party	
Inverness	Russell Johnston	Liberal Party	
Kinross and Western Perthshire	Gilmour Leburn	Unionist Party	
Kinross and Western Perthshire	Alec Douglas-Home	Conservative Party	Elected in 1963 by-election
Kilmarnock	Willie Ross	Labour Party	
Kirkcaldy Burghs	Harry Gourlay	Labour Party	
Lanark	Judith Hart	Labour Party	
Midlothian	James Hill	Labour Party	
Moray and Nairn	Gordon Campbell	Unionist Party	
Motherwell	George Lawson	Labour Party	
North Angus and Mearns	Alick Buchanan-Smith	Unionist Party	
North Lanarkshire	Peggy Herbison	Labour Party	
Orkney and Zetland	Jo Grimond	Liberal Party	
Paisley	John Robertson	Labour Party	
Perth and East Perthshire	Ian MacArthur	Unionist Party	
Ross and Cromarty	Alasdair Mackenzie	Liberal Party	
Roxburgh, Selkirk and Peebles	Charles Donaldson	Unionist Party	Died December 1964
Roxburgh, Selkirk and Peebles	David Steel	Liberal Party	Elected in 1965 by-election
Rutherglen	Gregor Mackenzie	Labour Party	
South Angus	Jock Bruce-Gardyne	Unionist Party	
South Ayrshire	Emrys Hughes	Labour Party	
Stirling and Falkirk Burghs	Malcolm MacPherson	Labour Party	
West Aberdeenshire	Forbes Hendry	Unionist Party	
West Dunbartonshire	Tom Steele	Labour Party	
West Fife	Willie Hamilton	Labour Party	
West Lothian	Tam Dalyell	Labour Party	
West Renfrewshire	Norman Buchan	Labour Party	
West Stirlingshire	William Baxter	Labour Party	
Western Isles	Malcolm Macmillan	Labour Party	

== See also ==
- Lists of MPs for constituencies in Scotland
