= James Carmichael (British politician) =

Scottish Labour politician

Member of Parliament for Glasgow Bridgeton
- In office 29 August 1946 – 8 June 1961
- Preceded by: James Maxton
- Succeeded by: James Bennett

Personal details
- Born: 7 April 1894 Glasgow, Scotland
- Died: 19 January 1966 (aged 71) Dumfries, Scotland
- Party: Labour
- Other political affiliations: Independent Labour Party

James Carmichael (7 April 1894 – 19 January 1966) was a Scottish Labour politician.

Carmichael was born in Glasgow, the son of George Carmichael, one of the founding members of the Independent Labour Party, and Jane McCann Carmichael. educated at the Scottish Labour College and worked as a constructional engineer, insurance agent and secretary. For fourteen years, he acted as organising secretary for the Scottish Independent Labour Party (ILP). He served on Glasgow Town Council 1939–46.

He was elected for Glasgow Bridgeton at a by-election in 1946, following the death of James Maxton, leader of the ILP. He was the ILP candidate, and he narrowly beat the Labour Party candidate to win the by-election. However this by-election was the ILP's "swan song"; he and the two other ILP MPs defected to the Labour Party at various times in 1947 and it ceased to be a serious electoral force after this.

Carmichael retired as an MP in 1961. The by-election to replace him was won by Labour, but it was one of the first elections where the Scottish National Party (SNP) won a significant vote, heralding further advances in the 1960s.

His son was Neil Carmichael, who was also a Glasgow Labour MP for several years, and was later created a life peer as Lord Carmichael of Kelvingrove. His son-in-law was Labour MP Hugh Brown.

Carmichael died at a hospital in Dumfries, aged 72.

Parliament of the United Kingdom
Preceded by James Maxton	Member of Parliament for Glasgow Bridgeton; 1946–1961	Succeeded by James Bennett
Party political offices
Preceded by William Stewart	Secretary of the Scottish Divisional Council of the Independent Labour Party; 1933–c.1938	Succeeded by Lachlan McQuarrie
