= Lord Rees =

Lord Rees may refer to:

- Peter Rees, Baron Rees (1926–2008), British politician and barrister
- Martin Rees, Baron Rees of Ludlow (born 1942), British cosmologist and astrophysicist

== See also ==
- William Rees-Mogg, Baron Rees-Mogg (1928–2012), British journalist
