= George Hay Morgan =

British politician

George Hay Morgan MP
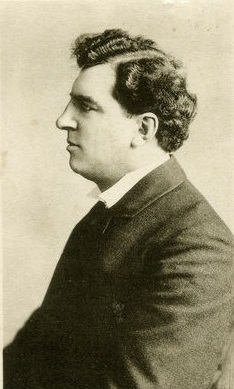

Member of Parliament for Truro
- In office 1906–1918
- Preceded by: Edwin Durning-Lawrence
- Succeeded by: Constituency abolished
- Majority: 6,097 (23.7%)

Personal details
- Born: 1866 Hay-on-Wye, Breconshire, Wales
- Died: 24 January 1931 (aged 64–65)
- Party: Liberal Party
- Education: Pontypool College; University College Cardiff; University of London
- Occupation: Politician; preacher

George Hay Morgan (1866 – 24 January 1931) was a British Liberal Party politician.

== Background ==
He was born in the town of Hay-on-Wye, Breconshire, in 1866. This is where his middle name came from. He was the son of Walter and Ann Morgan, of Wernwilk House, Hay-on-Wye. He studied at Pontypool College, University College Cardiff and the University of London. He married Margaret Jane Lewis of Pontnewynydd, Monmouthshire.

== Career ==
He was part of the Baptist Ministry in North London. From 1890 to 1900 he was in charge of the Baptist Church, Woodberry Down, London. He was a Barrister-at-law and was later admitted to the Bar.

== Political career ==
In Wales, he was an active member of the Liberal Party and also a member of the Welsh Nationalist Cymru Fydd. From 1897 to 1900 he was a member of the Tottenham School Board. At the 1900 general election he stood unsuccessfully as Liberal candidate for Tottenham.

He was elected Liberal MP for Truro in the Liberal landslide of 1906 replacing the Liberal Unionist MP Edwin Durning-Lawrence.

Although Truro had been a Unionist seat Morgan, as a Baptist preacher, was able to attract the Methodist vote by preaching in the constituency's principal chapels. Morgan also justified his right to represent the Truro seat in Cornwall 'because he was a Cornishman, a Celt, and he ...belonged to the same stock, of the same blood line'. Morgan was the first student from University College Cardiff to be elected to parliament.

He was a party whip in the House of Commons. He served until the Truro constituency was abolished in 1918. For the 1918 General election he tackled a challenge in a new area when he stood as Liberal candidate for Ipswich, however the Coalition Government endorsed his Unionist opponent and he lost badly.

He was however a supporter of David Lloyd George and the Coalition Government and in December 1920 he contested the 1920 Abertillery by-election as a Coalition Liberal candidate against a Labour candidate who successfully defended the seat.

He contested the 1922 general election as National Liberal candidate for Penryn and Falmouth, but finished fourth.

Following Liberal reunion, at the 1923 general election he fought Salford West but came third. This was his last parliamentary election campaign.

=== Election results ===
General election 1900: Tottenham
Party	Candidate	Votes	%	±%
Conservative	Joseph Howard	6,721	62.6	
Liberal	George Hay Morgan	4,009	37.4	
Majority		2,712	25.2	
Turnout				
Conservative hold		Swing		

General election 1906: Truro
Party	Candidate	Votes	%	±%
Liberal	George Hay Morgan	4,187	53.2	+9.1
Liberal Unionist	Sir Edwin Durning-Lawrence	3,683	46.8	−9.1
Majority		504	6.4	18.2
Turnout			83.7	+9.2
Liberal gain from Liberal Unionist		Swing	+9.1	

General election January 1910: Truro
Party	Candidate	Votes	%	±%
Liberal	George Hay Morgan	4,874	53.4	+0.2
Liberal Unionist	Sir Edwin Durning-Lawrence	4,261	46.6	−0.2
Majority		613	6.8	+0.4
Turnout			89.9	+6.2
Liberal hold		Swing	+0.2	

General election December 1910: Truro
Party	Candidate	Votes	%	±%
Liberal	George Hay Morgan	4,573	52.3	−1.1
Conservative	Charles Williams	4,176	47.7	+1.1
Majority		397	4.6	−2.2
Turnout			86.1	−3.8
Liberal hold		Swing	-1.1	

General election 14 December 1918: Ipswich
Party	Candidate	Votes	%	±%
Unionist	Francis John Childs Ganzoni	13,553		
Labour	Robert Jackson	8,143		
Liberal	George Hay Morgan	3,663		
Majority		5,410		
Turnout				
Unionist hold		Swing		

1920 Abertillery by-election
Party	Candidate	Votes	%	±%
Labour	George Barker	15,942	66.4	n/a
National Liberal	George Hay Morgan	7,842	33.6	n/a
Majority		7,650	32.8	n/a
Turnout			70.8	n/a
Labour hold		Swing	n/a	

General election 1922: Penryn and Falmouth
Party	Candidate	Votes	%	±%
Unionist	Denis Shipwright	11,566	42.7	−7.9
Liberal	Sir Courtenay Mansel	8,879	32.8	−16.6
Labour	Joseph Harris	4,482	16.6	n/a
National Liberal	George Hay Morgan	2,129	7.9	n/a
Majority		2,687	9.9	+8.7
Turnout			72.5	+15.9
Unionist hold		Swing	+4.3	

General election 1923: Salford West
Party	Candidate	Votes	%	±%
Labour	Alexander Wilkinson Frederick Haycock	9,868	38.4	+6.1
Unionist	Frederick Wolfe Astbury	9,752	37.9	−7.0
Liberal	George Hay Morgan	6,097	23.7	+0.9
Majority		116	0.5	13.1
Turnout		25,717	76.5	
Labour gain from Unionist		Swing	+6.5	

== Notes and references ==
Parliament of the United Kingdom
Preceded by Edwin Durning-Lawrence	Member of Parliament for Truro; 1906–1918	Constituency abolished
