= Peterstone Gout =

Tidal flat in south Wales

Coordinates: 51°31′8″N 3°2′28″W

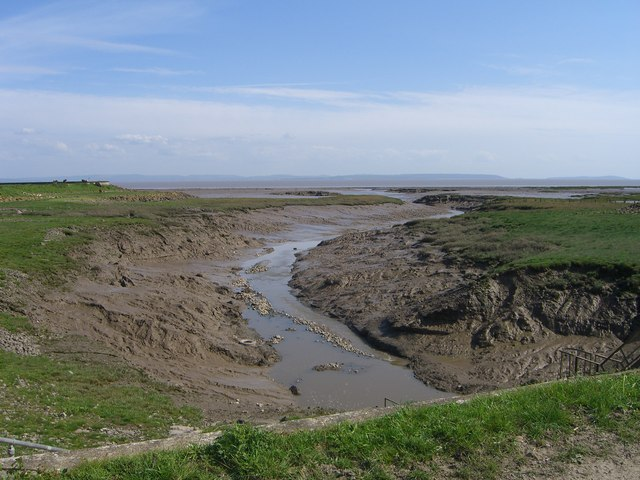

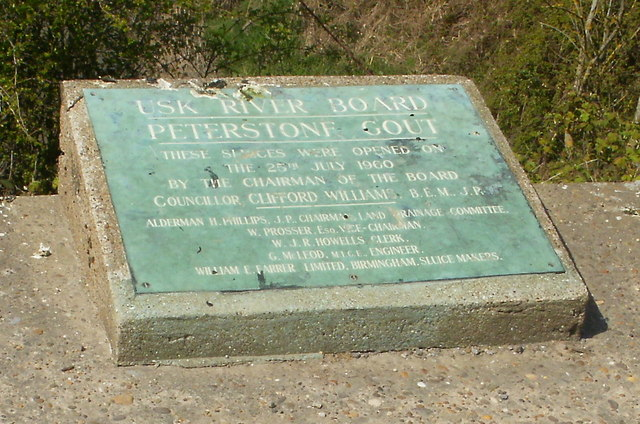
Peterstone Gout plaque.

Peterstone Gout is a tidal flat controlling the outfall to the sea near Peterstone Wentlooge, Newport, south Wales. It is located several miles along the coast east of Cardiff in the estuary of the River Usk. It is the main drainage point from the Wentloog Levels into the sea. The area is monitored by the Gwent Wildlife Trust.

A plaque is located next to the sluice control valves marking the opening of the facility on July 25, 1960 by Clifford Williams, Chairman of the Usk River Board.
