= 1946 Glasgow Bridgeton by-election =

UK parliamentary by-election

The 1946 Glasgow Bridgeton by-election was held on 29 August 1946, following the death of Independent Labour Party (ILP) Member of Parliament for Glasgow Bridgeton, James Maxton.

The constituency had been held by Maxton since the 1922 general election. Until 1931, he had contested the seat as a member of the Labour Party, and although the two parties had then split, Maxton had not had to contest his seat against a Labour candidate. Maxton also had a considerable personal vote as the most prominent member of the ILP.

The ILP had been in a gradual decline since leaving the Labour Party, and the death of Maxton opened the potential of a rupture in the ILP, many members of which were keen to rejoin Labour. The ILP had only two other members of parliament, so it attached a high importance to holding the seat. The party eventually nominated their Scottish Organising Secretary James Carmichael, a member of Glasgow City Council, for the seat.

Labour hoped to gain the seat and stood John Wheatley, a local lawyer who had served during World War II – in contrast, the ILP had opposed the war.

The Unionist Party had little chance of taking the seat, a strongly working class area, but the possibility of a split left vote could perhaps improve their hopes. The Scottish National Party, with little background in the constituency, stood a candidate in Wendy Wood.

Guy Aldred, a well-known local anarcho-communist standing on an abstentionist platform, completed the candidates.

The Liberal Party were particularly weak in Glasgow, and opted not to contest the by-election.

== Result ==
The ILP narrowly held the seat, but suffered a collapse in their majority. In this era of many two- and three-party by-elections, to win with only 34.3% of the votes cast was exceptional – the lowest winning percentage share since the 1930 Bromley by-election. Much of the ILP vote transferred to the Labour candidate, who came a close second. With the left vote split, the Unionists were able to place a strong third with 21.6%, while the Scottish National Party also picked up votes in fourth place, collecting 13.9%. Even Aldred was able to claim one of his best results, taking 2.2% and last position.

The ILP victory only briefly delayed the party's decline. The following year, Carmichael followed the party's two other MPs into the Labour Party, and by the 1950 general election, the ILP was able to take only 5.8% of the vote in Bridgeton. Carmichael held the seat in his new party colours until his retirement in 1961, while Wheatley was elected in Edinburgh East the following year.

Glasgow Bridgeton by-election, 1946
Party	Candidate	Votes	%	±%
Ind. Labour Party	James Carmichael	6,351	34.3	–32.1
Labour	John Wheatley	5,180	28.0	N/A
Unionist	V. Warren	3,987	21.6	−15.0
SNP	Wendy Wood	2,575	13.9	New
United Socialist Movement	Guy Aldred	405	2.2	New
Majority		1,171	6.3	−26.5
Turnout		18,498		
Ind. Labour Party hold		Swing		
