= Jeffrey Thomas (politician) =

British politician (1933–1989)

- Born: 12 November 1933
- Died: 17 May 1989 (aged 55); Pontypool
- Education: Abertillery Grammar School
- Alma mater: King's College London
- Occupation: Politician
- Political party: Labour (until 1981; 1986–89); SDP (1981–86)

Jeffrey Thomas QC (12 November 1933 – 17 May 1989) was a British politician.

== Early life ==
Thomas was educated at Abertillery Grammar School and King's College London, where he was president of the Students Union 1955–56. He was a barrister, called to the bar by Gray's Inn in 1957, and was appointed Queen's Counsel. He was at one time thought of as a future Lord Chancellor.

== Parliamentary career ==
After being defeated by 1,394 votes at Barry in 1966, Thomas was elected as a Labour Member of Parliament for Abertillery in 1970. In December 1981, he was one of a number of Labour MPs who defected to the new Social Democratic Party (SDP). His seat was abolished by boundary changes in 1983, and he stood that year in Cardiff West. He came third with 25.5% of the vote, which may have contributed to the victory of the Conservative Stefan Terlezki in a normally strong Labour seat.

He rejoined the Labour party in 1986. He died in Pontypool, aged 55.

== Sources ==
- The Times Guide to the House of Commons, Times Newspapers Ltd, 1983
- Leigh Rayment's Peerage Pages

Parliament of the United Kingdom
Preceded by Clifford Williams	Member of Parliament for Abertillery; 1970–1983	Constituency abolished
