= St Peter's Church, Wentlooge =

Coordinates: 51.5154°N 3.0563°W

- Parish Church of St Peter
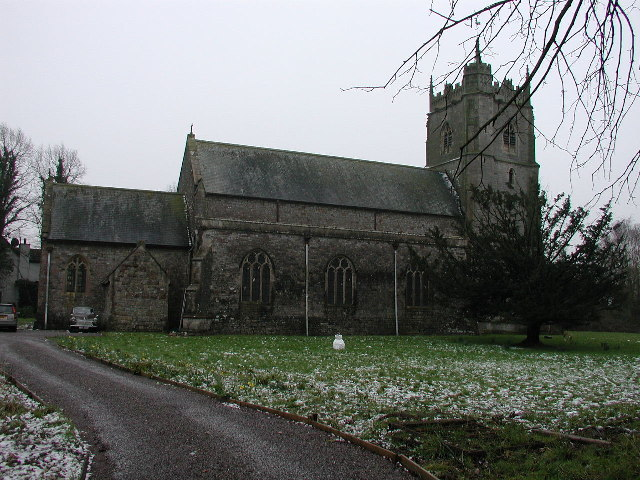
- St Peter's Church, Wentlooge
- Location: Peterstone
- Country: Wales

History
- Status: Deconsecrated
- Dedication: St Peter

Architecture
- Functional status: Private house
- Heritage designation: Grade I
- Designated: 3 January 1963

The Church of St Peter is the former parish church of the village of Peterstone, to the south west of the city of Newport, south Wales. Perpendicular in style, and dating from the fifteenth century, the church underwent two significant restorations, the first following the Great Flood in the early seventeenth century and then in the late nineteenth century. Described by the architectural historian John Newman as "the noblest and most beautiful Perpendicular church in the whole county", the building was listed Grade I on 3 January 1963.

== History and description ==
The church was built in the mid-fifteenth century, under the aegis of St Augustine's Abbey. Newman attributes the building's "ambitious, West Country character" to this. It is of grey limestone with oolitic limestone dressings. The building is large, comprising a nave with aisles and chancel, a three-stage West tower, a vestry and a porch. The tower is three storeyed with crocketted finials and has carved figures of saints on its four faces. The nave, and its hammerbeam roof is fifteenth century, although restored, while the chancel and its roof are nineteenth century. The 19th century restoration was funded by Sir George Walker Bt. in memory of his wife, Fanny, daughter of Lord Tredegar. Newman describes the interior as "beautifully calm and spacious".
