= Frank Ridley (secularist) =

British politician (1897–1994)

Francis Ambrose Ridley
- Born: 1897
- Died: 1994 (aged 96–97)
- Education: Salisbury Theological College

Francis Ambrose Ridley, usually known as Frank Ridley (22 February 1897 – 27 March 1994) was a Marxist and secularist of the United Kingdom.

== Life ==
Ridley was educated at Sedbergh School and Salisbury Theological College. He did not enter the Church, though he did gain a theology licentiate at Durham University in 1920. He later abandoned Christianity completely.

== Political activities ==
From 1925 to 1964, Ridley spoke every week at Speakers' Corner in London's Hyde Park.

Ridley was one of the founders of the Marxian League (aka Marxist League) in 1929. This small group might have become the British Section of Trotsky's International Left Opposition, but in 1931 Ridley and another member, Chandu Ram (H.R. Aggarwala) wrote Thesis on the British Situation, the Left Opposition and the Comintern, with which Trotsky disagreed. Ridley then joined the Independent Labour Party, writing regularly in their paper. Following the Second World War, he was in close contact with the Council communist Anton Pannekoek.

== Secularist activities ==
Ridley was president of the National Secular Society from 1951 to 1963. He edited The Freethinker from 1951 to 1954.

== Selected bibliography ==
- The Green Machine, (London: Noel Douglas, 1926)
- The Assassins (London, 1935 – reprinted by Socialist Platform, 1988)
- Mussolini over Africa (London: Wishart, 1935).
- At the Cross Roads of History: On the Present Social and Economic Crisis (London: Wishart Ltd, 1935)
- Next Year's War? (London: Secker and Warburg, 1936)
- Julian the Apostate and the Rise of Christianity (London: Watts & Co. Ltd, 1937)
- The Papacy and Fascism: The Crisis of the Twentieth Century (London: Secker and Warburg, 1937)
- The Jesuits: A Study in Counter Revolution (London: Secker and Warburg, 1938)
- Fascism – What Is It? (London: Freedom Press, 1941)
- Socialism and Religion (Engels Society, 21 Lime Tree Road, Heston, Middlesex, undated, assumed to be published around 1940s)
- Revolutionary Tradition in England (London: National Labour Press, 1947)
- The Evolution of the Papacy (London: Pioneer Press, 1949)
- The Roman Catholic Church and the Modern Age (London: Freedom Press, 1958)
- Pope John and the Cold War (Kenardington: Frank Maitland, 1961)
- Spartacus (Kenardington: Frank Maitland, 1961)
- Reminiscences of Hyde Park (Hyde Park Pamphlet no. 7) (London: Leslie Jones, 1985)
- Fascism Down The Ages: from Caesar to Hitler (London: Romer, 1988 – 2nd ed. 1991)

=== Articles ===
- "A Communist Party – The Problem of the Revolution in England" (The Militant, Vol. IV No. 29 (Whole No. 88), 31 October 1931, p. 1.)
- "Marxism, History and a Fourth International" (The Adelphi, May 1932)

== Bibliography ==
- Morrell, Robert (2003). "The Gentle Revolutionary: The Life and Work of Frank Ridley, Socialist and Secularist". Freethought History Research Group.

Media offices
Preceded by Fenner Brockway	Editor of the Socialist Leader with George Stone; 1947–1948	Succeeded by George Stone
