= James Maxton =

British ILP politician (1885–1946)

James Maxton MP
- Maxton in 1918

Member of Parliament for Glasgow Bridgeton
- In office 15 November 1922 – 23 July 1946
- Preceded by: Alexander MacCallum Scott
- Succeeded by: James Carmichael

Personal details
- Born: 22 June 1885 Pollokshaws, Glasgow, Scotland
- Died: 23 July 1946 (aged 61) Largs, Ayrshire, Scotland
- Cause of death: Cancer
- Party: Labour (until 1932); ILP (1932–1946)
- Spouses: Sarah McCallum (m. 1919; died 1922) Madeline Glasier (m. 1935)
- Children: James
- James Maxton's voice Maxton giving a speech published by Lansbury's Labour Weekly; Recorded December 1, 1926

James Maxton (22 June 1885 – 23 July 1946) was a Scottish left-wing politician, who served as Member of Parliament for Glasgow Bridgeton from 1922 until his death in 1946. He was the chair of the Independent Labour Party from 1926 to 1931 and from 1934 to 1939.

He was a pacifist who opposed both world wars. A prominent proponent of Home Rule for Scotland, he is remembered as one of the leading figures of the Red Clydeside era. He broke with Ramsay MacDonald and the second minority Labour government, and became one of its most bitter critics following the disaffiliation of the ILP from the Labour Party in 1932.

== Biography ==
=== Early years ===
Born in the then burgh of Pollokshaws (now part of the city of Glasgow) in 1885, James Maxton was the son of two schoolteachers. He would himself later enter that profession after his education at Hutchesons' Boys' Grammar School and the University of Glasgow.

Whilst studying at the University of Glasgow, Maxton had described his political loyalties as lying with the Conservatives. He soon came to socialism, however, and in 1904 he joined the Barrhead branch of the Independent Labour Party (ILP). Maxton's move to socialism was heavily influenced by John Maclean, a fellow student at Glasgow University. In addition to Maclean's influence, Maxton was moved towards socialism by a meeting which he attended in Paisley which was addressed by party leader Philip Snowden. He was also influenced by the written word, including books by Robert Blatchford and Peter Kropotkin.

Later in life, Maxton claimed that the biggest influence in his decision to become a socialist was the grinding poverty experienced by many of the children he taught. He subsequently convinced all his siblings to join the ILP, with his sister Annie becoming a prominent figure in the organisation.

From 1906 to 1910, Maxton was active in the Schoolmasters' Union, where he refined his talents as a propagandist and orator.

=== Personal life ===
On 24 July 1919, Maxton married teacher Sarah McCallum. They had one child, James, in 1921. Sarah died in 1922. On 14 March 1935, Maxton married Madeline Grace Glasier, who had worked for him as a volunteer researcher and secretary for 11 years.

=== Political career ===
Campaign leaflet from Maxton's first unsuccessful bid for parliament, 1918.

Maxton was known as an effective public speaker. Historian Keith Middlemas offers this vivid description:

He was well-known as a platform orator with a thin hatchet face and mane of long black hair which fell across his face giving it a saturnine and piratical appearance, but although he was an established speaker and propagandist for the ILP, his considerable intellect had been somewhat masked by the showman's facility. The genuine hero-worship which grew around him was restricted to his native Barrhead where the ILP branch was his private preserve.

Maxton was a vociferous opponent of World War I. He was a conscientious objector, refusing conscription into the British Armed Forces, and instead being given work on barges. During this time he was involved in organizing strikes in the shipyards as part of the Clyde Workers' Committee. Maxton was arrested in 1916, and charged with sedition. He was subsequently found guilty and imprisoned for a year.

In 1918, Maxton was elected to the National Council of the Labour Party. He and Ramsay MacDonald were responsible for moving the motion at the National Executive Committee of the Labour Party which dictated that Labour members of David Lloyd George's wartime coalition government resign from it in preparation for the 1918 general election. He was also a keen supporter of Scottish Home Rule and was for a while the President of the Scottish Home Rule Association when Ramsay MacDonald was the Secretary of the London Branch.

Maxton stood for parliament in the 1918 general election as a Labour Party candidate but was defeated in this first effort.

In his next electoral attempt, Maxton was successful, winning a seat as Member of Parliament (MP) for Glasgow Bridgeton in the 1922 general election. Once in parliament, however, Maxton's forthright views often caused controversy. In 1923, his parliamentary privileges were temporarily removed when he called the Conservative MP Sir Frederick Banbury a "murderer", following the government's decision to withdraw school milk. In 1933, when then-Prime Minister MacDonald made a particularly meandering and incoherent speech to Parliament, it was interrupted by Maxton calling out: "Sit down, man, you're a bloody tragedy."

Maxton was chairman of the ILP from 1926 to 1931, and from 1934 to 1939; he was generally seen as the symbol of the ILP after its break from Labour in 1932. A militant socialist, he was horrified by the perceived class collaborationism of the Trades Union Congress after the defeat of the 1926 General Strike, and was co-author with the left-wing Miners leader, Arthur Cook, of the "Cook-Maxton Manifesto" of 1928 calling for class warfare in the overthrow of capitalism. As chairman of the ILP, he endorsed a "Living Wages" policy demanding high minimum wages for workers and nationalization of all private businesses unable to pay them.

In 1927, Maxton was elected International Chairman of the League against Imperialism at its General Council meeting in Brussels; he was re-elected to the same post at the League's 1929 Conference in Frankfurt.

In 1932, Maxton published a popular biography of Bolshevik leader Vladimir Lenin. Maxton wrote of him: "We are still too near to [Lenin] in time, too close to the happenings incidental to his work, too much under the influence of partisan antipathies or sympathies to venture final assessments. It is not yet possible to say that Russia has in practice realised the Utopian state of plenty, of liberty and of happiness, nor is it possible to say that other countries may not reach a better state in speedier and less harsh ways. It is possible to say that this man, quiet, unassuming, unimposing, set himself a task of immense size when still a boy, and stuck to it tenaciously to the end of his life."

In 1936, following the abdication of Edward VIII, Maxton proposed a "republican amendment" to the Abdication Bill, which would have turned the UK from a monarchy into a republic. Maxton argued that while the Monarchy had benefited Britain in the past, it had now "outlived its usefulness". The amendment was defeated by 403 votes to five.

With Henk Sneevliet of the Dutch revolutionary communist party the RSP, Maxton headed deputations to civil war Spain on behalf of the international campaign for socialists there persecuted after the May Days of Barcelona. "They harassed Republican Ministers with their questions and protests and proceeded to knock on the doors of the Communist Party's secret prisons." Victor Serge described "Maxton the imperturbable, with his angular face and steady grey eyes, pipe in mouth, heard the Spanish ministers Irujo and Zugazagoita — honest Republicans who had done their utmost to save the victims—reply to him: 'These abominable acts are done against our will. Do you think we are safe ourselves?'" Despite expecting to hear that the POUM Executive had been summarily executed, the campaign, according to Victor Serge in the 1940s, saved their lives (with the exception of Andreu Nin) and was "a real moral triumph".

In his diary for 3 September 1939, Sir Ralph Glyn reported that "James Maxton, the pacifist, rose, gaunt, a Horseman from the Apocalypse, doom written across his face," and declared, "Don't let's talk of national honour: what do such phrases mean? The plain fact is that war means the slaughter of millions. If the Prime Minister can still maintain the peace, he will have saved those lives, he mustn't be rushed."

During the Second World War, Maxton visited HM Prison Brixton to see Oswald Mosley, the leader of the British Union of Fascists, who was then being detained under the Defence Regulations.

On 29 January 1942, Maxton was the only one out of 465 members of the House of Commons to vote against a Motion of Confidence in Winston Churchill's wartime government.

=== Death and legacy ===
Maxton died of cancer in Largs, Ayrshire, in 1946, whilst sitting as MP for Bridgeton. He was cremated at Glasgow Crematorium. After his death, the ILP stagnated until it ceased to be a viable independent political party.

Maxton was considered one of the greatest orators of the time, both within and outside the House of Commons. Churchill, whilst holding political opinions wholly inconsistent with those of Maxton, described him as "the greatest parliamentarian of his day". His biographer Graham Walker concludes:

Maxton was one of the most charismatic figures in twentieth-century British public life. He was essentially a Scottish radical whose propagandist skills for the wider British labour movement have earned him folk hero status in socialist circles.

Maxton heavily influenced his family's political opinions, and his mother and all his siblings also joined the ILP. His brother John was also a conscientious objector in the First World War. His son James and his nephew John Maxton were conscientious objectors to National Service after the Second World War. John went on to become Labour MP for the Cathcart division of Glasgow from 1979 to 2001 and was made a life peer in 2004.

Former British Prime Minister, Gordon Brown, published a biography, Maxton, based on his PhD thesis at the University of Edinburgh.

== Publications by James Maxton ==
- A Living Wage for All: Dr. Salter's Speech in the House of Commons on Wednesday, March 7, 1923. London: Bermondsey Independent Labour Party, 1923.
- The Left Wing: Its Programme and Activities. London: National Left Wing Provisional Committee, n.d. [c. 1926].
- Twenty Points for Socialism. London: ILP Publication Department, n.d. [c. 1927].
- Our Case for a Socialist Revival. With A.J. Cook. London : Workers' Publications, n.d. [c. 1928].
- The Roads to Socialism: Chairman's Address at the ILP Conference. London: ILP Publication Department, 1929.
- The Case of Benn v. Maxton: Being a Correspondence on Capitalism and Socialism, to which is Appended the Report of a Broadcast Debate. With Ernest John Pickstone Benn. London: E. Benn, 1929.
- Speech on the Government's Unemployment Proposals in the House of Commons 4 November 1929. London: ILP Publication Department, n.d. [1929].
- Where the ILP Stands: Presidential Address of J. Maxton to the ILP Conference, together with the Declaration on the Relation of the ILP to the Labour Party. London: ILP Publication Department, 1930.
- Lenin. New York: D. Appleton & Co., 1932.
- Widespread Poverty: "The Existing Social Order Must Go." London: Independent Labour Party, 1933.
- A Clear Lead. With Fenner Brockway. London: Independent Labour Party, 1933.
- Keir Hardie: Prophet and Pioneer. London: F. Johnson, n.d. [c. 1933].
- Dictators and Dictatorship. London: Independent Labour Party, n.d. [c. 1934].
- If I Were Dictator. London: Methuen, 1935.
- The Unity Campaign. With Stafford Cripps and Harry Pollitt. London : National Unity Campaign Committee, 1937.
- Maxton's Great Anti-War Speech. Glasgow : Civic Press, n.d. [1939].
- Why We Oppose Conscription. London: Independent Labour Party, n.d. [1939].
- Break Truce with Tories and Build Labour Unity! A Statement for Consideration by Men and Women of the Labour Movement. With Fenner Brockway. n.c. [London]: Independent Labour Party, n.d. [1943].

Parliament of the United Kingdom
Preceded by MacCallum Scott	Member of Parliament for Glasgow Bridgeton; 1922–1946	Succeeded by James Carmichael
Party political offices
Preceded by James A. Allan	Scottish Division representative on the Independent Labour Party National Administrative Council; 1914–1916	Succeeded by Tom Johnston
Preceded by Clifford Allen	Chairman of the Independent Labour Party; 1926–1931	Succeeded by Fenner Brockway
Preceded by Fenner Brockway	Chairman of the Independent Labour Party; 1934–1939	Succeeded by C. A. Smith
