= 1920 Abertillery by-election =

UK Parliamentary by-election

| ← 1918 | 21 December 1920 | 1922 → |
| Candidate | Barker | Hay Morgan |
| Party | Labour | Liberal |
| Popular vote | 15,942 | 7,842 |
| Percentage | 66.4% | 33.6% |
MP before election
Brace
Labour
Subsequent MP
Barker
Labour

The 1920 Abertillery by-election was held on 21 December 1920. The by-election was held due to the resignation of the incumbent Labour MP, William Brace. It was won by the Labour candidate George Barker.

1920 Abertillery by-election
| Party | | Candidate | Votes | % | ±% |
|---|---|---|---|---|---|
| | Labour | George Barker | 15,942 | 66.4 | N/A |
| C | Liberal | George Hay Morgan | 7,842 | 33.6 | N/A |
| Majority | | | 7,650 | 32.8 | N/A |
| Turnout | | | 23,784 | 70.8 | N/A |
| Registered electors | | | 32,960 | | |
| | Labour hold | | Swing | N/A | |
C indicates candidate endorsed by the coalition government.
