= Peter Rees, Baron Rees =

British politician and barrister (1926–2008)

The Right Honourable The Lord Rees PC QC
- Peter Rees

Chief Secretary to the Treasury
- In office 11 June 1983 – 2 September 1985
- Prime Minister: Margaret Thatcher
- Chancellor: Nigel Lawson
- Preceded by: Leon Brittan
- Succeeded by: John MacGregor

Member of the House of Lords
- Lord Temporal
- Life peerage 16 November 1987 – 30 November 2008

Member of Parliament for Dover
- In office 18 June 1970 – 18 May 1987
- Preceded by: David Ennals
- Succeeded by: David Shaw

Personal details
- Born: Peter Wynford Innes Rees; 9 December 1926 Camberley, Surrey, England
- Died: 30 November 2008 (aged 81) Lambeth, London, England
- Party: Conservative
- Spouse: Anthea Wendell (m. 1969)
- Education: Christ Church, Oxford; Inner Temple

Peter Wynford Innes Rees, Baron Rees, PC, QC (9 December 1926 – 30 November 2008) was a British Conservative politician and barrister. He was Member of Parliament (MP) for Dover and Deal from 1974 to 1983 and MP for Dover from 1970 to 1974 and 1983 to 1987. He was Chief Secretary to the Treasury from 1983 until 1985. He was created a life peer as Baron Rees, of Goytre, in 1987.

== Early life and education ==
Rees was born in Camberley, Surrey, the only son of Major-General Thomas Wynford Rees of the India Army, and Agatha Rosalie (née Innes). His maternal grandfather was Sir Charles Alexander Innes, Governor of British Burma from 1927 to 1932. He was educated at Stowe School. He joined the Scots Guards in 1945 and three years later continued his education at Christ Church, Oxford. In 1953, he was called to the bar by the Inner Temple. He became a QC in 1969.

== Political career ==
At the 1964 general election Rees stood as the Conservative candidate in the safe Labour seat of Abertillery, where he won only 14% of the votes, against the 86% won by the only other candidate, Labour's Reverend Llewellyn Williams. When Williams died in 1965, Rees was the Conservative candidate in the consequent by-election, losing by a similarly large margin.

At the 1966 election, he stood in the more promising Labour-held seat of Liverpool West Derby, but lost again.

He finally entered Parliament at the 1970 general election, when he won in Dover, with a majority of 1,649 over sitting Labour MP David Ennals.

== Parliament ==
In Edward Heath's government, he served from 1972 to 1973 as Parliamentary Private Secretary to the Solicitor General, Michael Havers.

In 1979, when the Conservative Party entered government under Margaret Thatcher, he became Minister of State at the Treasury, working to the Chancellor of the Exchequer, Geoffrey Howe, before becoming Minister for Trade in 1981. After the 1983 UK general election he was appointed to the cabinet as Chief Secretary to the Treasury, working to the new Chancellor of the Exchequer, Nigel Lawson. He was made Privy Counsellor the same year.

Unlike most other Chief Secretaries to the Treasury, Peter Rees never went further within the Cabinet, leaving the post in the September 1985 cabinet reshuffle. He retired from Parliament at the 1987 general election, aged 61, and on 16 November 1987 was created a life peer as Baron Rees, of Goytre in the County of Gwent and sat in the House of Lords as a Conservative.

== Personal life ==
In 1969, he married Anthea Peronelle Wendell, daughter of Major Hugh John Maxwell-Hyslop, and former wife of Major Jack Wendell. They had no children. Through this marriage, he was the stepfather of Anthea's daughters from her first marriage to Jac Wendell: Francesca and Serena Wendell (later the second wife of John Crichton-Stuart, 7th Marquess of Bute).

Rees died of a spontaneous subarachnoid haemorrhage at St Thomas' Hospital, London, following a short illness. He was buried at St Peter's Church, Goytre.

== Arms ==
Coat of arms of Peter Rees, Baron Rees
Crest Upon a chapeau turned up ermines a peacock holding in its beak an oak sprig proper. Escutcheon Argent two chevrons ermines between three ravens proper. Supporters Two Bengal tigers rampant, the Dexter on a grassy mount growing therefrom two tea-plant flowers, and the Sinister on a like mount growing therefrom as many lotus flowers all proper. Motto Si Fueris Felix Multos Numerabis Amices

Parliament of the United Kingdom
Preceded by David Ennals	Member of Parliament for Dover; 1970–1987	Succeeded by David Shaw
Political offices
Preceded by Leon Brittan	Chief Secretary to the Treasury; 1983–1985	Succeeded by John MacGregor
