= George Stone (politician) =

British journalist

George Stone (1907–2001) was a British socialist journalist.

Born in Fulham, Stone studied at the London School of Economics and joined the Independent Labour Party (ILP). During World War II, he worked for the Aeronautical Inspection Department, and he subsequently moved to Glasgow. In 1947, he became joint editor with Frank Ridley of the party's weekly newspaper, the Socialist Leader and, when Ridley resigned the following year, he continued as sole editor.

Stone stood for the ILP in Glasgow Bridgeton at the 1955 general election, taking only 7.4% of the vote in a seat the party had held until 1947. He stood again at the 1961 Glasgow Bridgeton by-election, his vote declining further to only 3.1%. By this point, he was also Chairman of the Scottish Divisional Council of the ILP. Soon afterwards, he began working as a sub-editor with the Glasgow Herald, quickly becoming Father of the Chapel of the National Union of Journalists (NUJ). In 1966, he was appointed as the full-time NUJ official for Scotland and Northern England, serving until 1975.

Media offices
Preceded by Fenner Brockway	Editor of the Socialist Leader with Frank Ridley, 1947–1948; 1947–1960	Succeeded by Wilfred Wigham
