= Peterstone =

Coordinates: 51.51596°N 3.05631°W

Peterstone: Welsh: Llanbedr
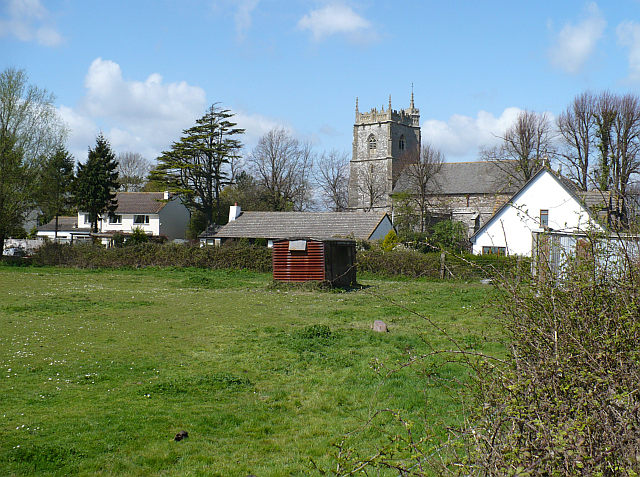

- Location within Newport
- Principal area: Newport
- Country: Wales
- Sovereign state: United Kingdom
- Post town: CARDIFF
- Postcode district: CF3
- Dialling code: 01633
- Police: Gwent
- Fire: South Wales
- Ambulance: Welsh
- UK Parliament: Newport West
- Senedd Cymru – Welsh Parliament: Newport

Peterstone or Peterstone Wentlooge (Welsh: Llanbedr Gwynllŵg) is a small village to the south-west of the city of Newport, South Wales.

== Location ==
Peterstone Wentlooge lies 5.6 miles south-west of Newport city centre and 5.5 miles east of Cardiff city centre.

It is within the community parish of Wentloog and the electoral ward of Marshfield.

== History and amenities ==
Like most of the settlements on the Gwent Levels it lies on land reclaimed from the Bristol Channel . Peterstone itself lies right against the sea wall , and .

The former parish church, St Peter's, is now a private house..

The local pub, the Six Bells , closed in 2018.

== Manor claim 2004 ==
The village became the focal point of press attention in 2004 as Mark Roberts had previously bought the Lord of the manor title and then went to charge villagers excessive fees to cross what had always been used freely as their own land. Matters were raised in parliament and were debated with a reply on the subject from the Parliamentary Under-Secretary of State for Constitutional Affairs acknowledging 'need for reform of the remnants of feudal and manorial law'.

== See also ==
- Peterstone Gout
