= George Daggar =

George Daggar (6 November 1879 – 14 October 1950) was a Labour Party politician in the United Kingdom.

He was elected at the 1929 general election as Member of Parliament (MP) for the safe Labour seat of Abertillery in Monmouthshire, Wales. He represented the constituency in the House of Commons until his death at the age of 70, in Bedwellty, eight months after being returned to Parliament for the fifth time at the 1950 general election. At the time he was vice-chairman of his party.

Parliament of the United Kingdom
Preceded by George Barker	Member of Parliament for Abertillery; 1929–1950	Succeeded by Llywelyn Williams
Trade union offices
Preceded by George Barker	Agent for the Monmouth Western Valleys District of the South Wales Miners' Federation; 1921–1929	Succeeded by W. J. Saddler
