= MacCallum Scott =

British politician (1874–1928)

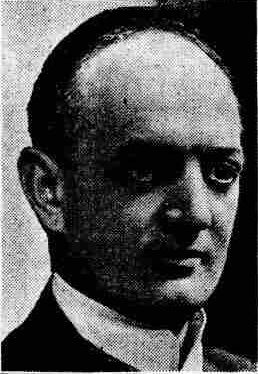

Alexander MacCallum Scott (1874–1928) was Liberal MP for Glasgow Bridgeton.

He was president of Glasgow University Union, worked briefly served as private secretary to Winston Churchill, and was the first biographer of Churchill (works published 1905 and 1916).

He won Glasgow Bridgeton in December 1910, and held it as a supporter of Lloyd George's coalition in 1918, but lost it in 1922. During the 1924 General Election, he sent a message of support to all Scottish Labour candidates not opposed by Liberals. He criticised the Liberal Leader, H. H. Asquith, for entering into "a compact with the Tories to facilitate a Tory Majority". He resigned from the Liberal Party in late 1924. He joined the Labour Party in 1927, which adopted him as a prospective parliamentary candidate.

He died in the crash of an aeroplane flying between Victoria, British Columbia, and Seattle.

His son, John Hutchison MacCallum Scott was active in the Liberal Party and contested the 1945 General Election at Leeds North and later became involved with Liberal International.

== Works ==
- Winston Spencer Churchill (Newnes, 1905)
- The Truth About Tibet (Simpkin, Marshall & Co., 1905)
- National Education. The Secular Solution, the Only Way (Morning Leader, 1906)
- Through Finland to St. Petersburg (Grant Richards, 1908)
- Equal Pay for Equal Work. A Woman Suffrage Fallacy (National League for Opposing Woman Suffrage, 1912)
- The Physical Force Argument against Woman Suffrage (National League for Opposing Woman Suffrage, 1912)
- Winston Churchill in Peace and War (Newnes, 1916)
- Bits of Chelsea (Macrea Gallery, 1921) illus. by Thomas Austen Brown
- Barbary: The Romance of the Nearest East (Thornton Butterworth, 1921)
- Clydesdale (Thornton Butterworth, 1924)
- Beyond the Baltic (Thornton Butterworth, 1925)
- Suomi: The Land of the Finns (Thornton Butterworth, 1926)
- From Liberalism to Labour (Deveron Press, 1927)

Parliament of the United Kingdom
Preceded by James William Cleland	Member of Parliament for Glasgow Bridgeton; December 1910–1922	Succeeded by James Maxton
