= 1950 Abertillery by-election =

UK parliamentary by-election

The 1950 Abertillery by-election was held on 30 November 1950 in Abertillery, Blaenau Gwent, following the death of the incumbent Labour MP George Daggar. Local minister Llywelyn Williams stood for the Labour Party, while Richard Body contested it for the Conservative Party. Williams was elected, with a majority of 20,783 (73%).

== Background ==
At the 1950 general election, George Daggar held his seat for the Labour Party. He defeated the challenger from the Conservative Party, O.J. Lewis, with a majority of 25,206. By September that year, Dagger was too ill to attend votes at the House of Commons of the United Kingdom, including one on the steel debate opened by Winston Churchill; the largest opposition vote since 1924. Dagger was one of only two MPs not to be present, alongside Harold Roberts for the Conservative Party. Although around the same time, Dagger was said to be showing signs of improvement. Following his death, the seat was re-contested.

=== Candidates ===
The candidates put forward by the parties were the Rev. Llywelyn Williams for Labour, and Richard Body for the Conservative Party. Williams resigned his ministry of the Welsh Congregational Church at Abertillery in order to contest the seat. Body did not have any local links, and had contested the Rotherham constituency at the 1950 general election.

== Result ==
The by-election was held on 30 November, with the result announced the following day. It was the same day as the by-election in the Bristol South East constituency. Williams held the seat for the Labour Party, with 26,622 votes and a share increase by just over half of one per cent, while Body received 3,839 and saw his share decrease by the same amount.

1950 Abertillery by-election
Party	Candidate	Votes	%	±%
Labour	Llywelyn Williams	24,622	86.5	−0.5
Conservative	Richard Body	3,839	13.5	+0.5
Majority		20,783	73.0	−1.0
Turnout		28,461	71.1	−13.5
Registered electors		40,011		
Labour hold		Swing		
