= Abertillery (UK Parliament constituency) =

UK Parliament constituency (1918–1983)

- Former county constituency for the House of Commons

1918–1983
- Seats: one
- Created from: West Monmouthshire
- Replaced by: Blaenau Gwent and Islwyn

Abertillery was a county constituency centred on the town of Abertillery in Monmouthshire. It returned one Member of Parliament (MP) to the House of Commons of the Parliament of the United Kingdom, elected by the first past the post system of election. From 1950 up to (and including) 1970, it was the safest Labour seat in the United Kingdom.

The constituency was created for the 1918 general election, and abolished for the 1983 general election.

== Boundaries ==
The constituency consisted of the urban districts of Abercarn, Abertillery and Nantyglo and Blaina.

== Members of Parliament ==
Election	Member	Party
1918	William Brace	Labour
1920 by-election	George Barker	Labour
1929	George Daggar	Labour
1950 by-election	Rev Llywelyn Williams	Labour
1965 by-election	Clifford Williams	Labour
1970	Jeffrey Thomas	Labour
1981	Jeffrey Thomas	SDP
1983	constituency abolished	

== Elections ==
=== Elections in the 1910s ===
Brace

1918 general election: Abertillery
Party	Candidate	Votes	%	±%
Labour	William Brace	Unopposed		
Labour win (new seat)				

=== Elections in the 1920s ===
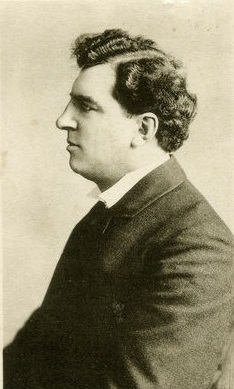
Hay Morgan

1920 Abertillery by-election
Party		Candidate	Votes	%	±%
	Labour	George Barker	15,942	66.4	N/A
C	Liberal	George Hay Morgan	7,842	33.6	New
Majority			7,650	32.8	N/A
Turnout			23,784	70.8	N/A
	Labour hold		Swing	N/A	
C indicates candidate endorsed by the coalition government.

1922 general election: Abertillery
Party	Candidate	Votes	%	±%
Labour	George Barker	Unopposed	N/A	N/A
Labour hold				

1923 general election: Abertillery
Party	Candidate	Votes	%	±%
Labour	George Barker	Unopposed	N/A	N/A
Labour hold				

1924 general election: Abertillery
Party	Candidate	Votes	%	±%
Labour	George Barker	Unopposed	N/A	N/A
Labour hold				

1929 general election: Abertillery
Party	Candidate	Votes	%	±%
Labour	George Daggar	20,175	64.5	N/A
Liberal	Walter Reynallt Meredith	8,425	26.9	New
Unionist	Peter John Feilding Chapman-Walker	2,697	8.6	New
Majority		11,750	37.6	N/A
Turnout		31,297	82.4	N/A
Labour hold		Swing	N/A	

=== Elections in the 1930s ===
1931 general election: Abertillery
Party	Candidate	Votes	%	±%
Labour	George Daggar	Unopposed	N/A	N/A
Labour hold				

1935 general election: Abertillery
Party	Candidate	Votes	%	±%
Labour	George Daggar	Unopposed	N/A	N/A
Labour hold				

General Election 1939–40:

Another General Election was required to take place before the end of 1940. The political parties had been making preparations for an election to take place and by the Autumn of 1939, the following candidates had been selected;

- Labour: George Daggar
- Conservative:

=== Elections in the 1940s ===
1945 general election: Abertillery
Party	Candidate	Votes	%	±%
Labour	George Daggar	28,615	86.6	N/A
National	John Hayward	4,422	13.4	New
Majority		24,193	73.2	N/A
Turnout		33,037	81.1	N/A
Labour hold		Swing	N/A	

=== Elections in the 1950s ===
1950 general election: Abertillery
Party	Candidate	Votes	%	±%
Labour	George Daggar	29,609	87.05	
Conservative	OJ Lewis	4,403	12.95	New
Majority		25,206	74.10	
Turnout		34,012	84.58	
Labour hold		Swing		

1950 Abertillery by-election
Party	Candidate	Votes	%	±%
Labour	Llywelyn Williams	24,622	86.51	−0.54
Conservative	Richard Body	3,839	13.49	+0.54
Majority		20,783	73.02	−1.09
Turnout		28,461	71.1	−15.5
Labour hold		Swing		

1951 general election: Abertillery
Party	Candidate	Votes	%	±%
Labour	Llywelyn Williams	29,321	86.94	−0.11
Conservative	John Radcliffe	4,404	13.06	+0.11
Majority		24,917	73.88	−0.22
Turnout		33,725	84.04	−0.54
Labour hold		Swing	−0.11	

1955 general election: Abertillery
Party	Candidate	Votes	%	±%
Labour	Llywelyn Williams	25,599	82.74	−4.20
Conservative	Arthur G Davies	4,081	13.19	+0.13
Welsh Nationalist	Trefor Richard Morgan	1,259	4.07	New
Majority		21,518	69.55	−4.33
Turnout		30,939	79.11	−4.93
Labour hold		Swing	−2.17	

1959 general election: Abertillery
Party	Candidate	Votes	%	±%
Labour	Llywelyn Williams	26,931	85.0	+2.3
Conservative	Ronald J Maddocks	4,740	15.0	+1.8
Majority		22,191	70.0	+0.5
Turnout		31,671	81.9	+2.8
Labour hold		Swing	+0.3	

=== Elections in the 1960s ===
1964 general election: Abertillery
Party	Candidate	Votes	%	±%
Labour	Llywelyn Williams	24,204	85.9	+0.9
Conservative	Peter Rees	3,973	14.1	−0.9
Majority		20,231	71.8	+1.8
Turnout		28,177	75.5	−6.4
Labour hold		Swing		

1965 Abertillery by-election
Party	Candidate	Votes	%	±%
Labour	Clifford Williams	18,256	79.0	−6.9
Conservative	Peter Rees	3,309	14.3	+0.2
Plaid Cymru	Edward Merriman	1,551	6.7	New
Majority		14,947	64.7	−7.1
Turnout		23,116	63.2	−12.3
Labour hold		Swing		

1966 general election: Abertillery
Party	Candidate	Votes	%	±%
Labour	Clifford Williams	23,353	88.1	+2.2
Conservative	Anthony Peter Wallis	3,151	11.9	−2.2
Majority		20,202	76.2	+4.4
Turnout		26,504	73.4	−2.1
Labour hold		Swing		

=== Elections in the 1970s ===
1970 general election: Abertillery
Party	Candidate	Votes	%	±%
Labour	Jeffrey Thomas	22,819	81.4	−6.7
Conservative	John E. Rendle	3,478	12.4	+0.5
Plaid Cymru	David B. Harries	1,751	6.2	New
Majority		19,341	69.0	−7.2
Turnout		28,048	75.0	+1.6
Labour hold		Swing		

February 1974 general election: Abertillery
Party	Candidate	Votes	%	±%
Labour	Jeffrey Thomas	20,068	70.3	−11.1
Plaid Cymru	William Aneurin Richards	3,119	10.9	+4.7
Conservative	Neil Hamilton	2,730	9.6	−2.8
Liberal	Hugh Westcott Clark	2,632	9.2	New
Majority		16,949	59.4	−9.6
Turnout		28,549	78.6	−3.4
Labour hold		Swing		

October 1974 general election: Abertillery
Party	Candidate	Votes	%	±%
Labour	Jeffrey Thomas	20,835	76.9	+5.6
Plaid Cymru	William Aneurin Richards	2,480	9.0	−1.9
Conservative	Pamela Joan Evelyn Larney	2,364	8.6	−1.0
Liberal	Hugh Westcott Clark	1,779	6.5	−2.7
Majority		18,355	66.9	+7.5
Turnout		27,458	75.1	−3.5
Labour hold		Swing		

1979 general election: Abertillery
Party	Candidate	Votes	%	±%
Labour	Jeffrey Thomas	21,698	76.0	−0.9
Conservative	Ralph Tuck	4,613	16.2	+7.6
Plaid Cymru	David Brian Harries	2,248	7.9	−1.1
Majority		17,085	59.8	−7.1
Turnout		28,559	80.2	+5.1
Labour hold		Swing		
