= Clifford Williams (politician) =

Welsh politician and miner

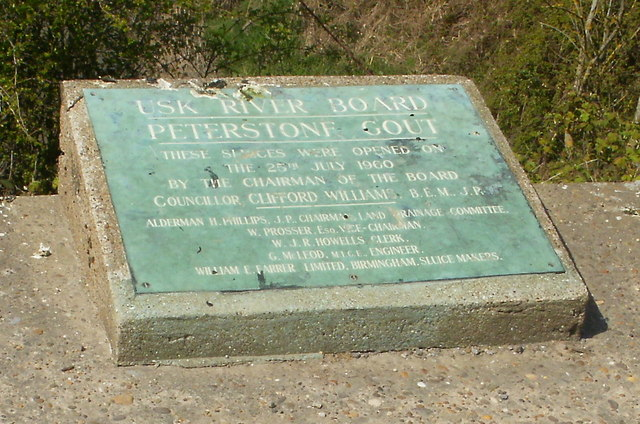
A plaque at Peterstone Gout, Monmouthshire, laid by Williams in 1960

Albert Clifford Williams, BEM (28 June 1905 – 1987) was a Welsh Labour Party politician and miner at Rose Heyworth Colliery in Abertillery. He went to a primary school in Blaina, Monmouthshire, but started work in the mines at the age of 14. Williams became a National Union of Mineworkers official in 1934. In 1952 he became a Justice of the Peace and he was a member of hospital boards for thirty years. He was also Chairman of Usk River Board for ten years.

Williams was awarded the British Empire Medal in 1957. A Monmouthshire County Councillor, he became a County Alderman in 1964 and served until 1974 when Aldermen were abolished. In April 1965 he was elected as member of parliament (MP) for the safe Labour seat of Abertillery in a by-election after the death of sitting MP Llywelyn Williams. He was re-elected to the House of Commons at the 1966 general election but stood down in 1970.

After the end of his Parliamentary career, Williams served on the Sports Council for Wales (now Sport Wales) from 1972 to 1975. He also became a member of the Welsh National Water Development Authority.

Parliament of the United Kingdom
Preceded by Llywelyn Williams	Member of Parliament for Abertillery; 1965–1970	Succeeded by Jeffrey Thomas
