= 1961 Glasgow Bridgeton by-election =

UK parliamentary by-election

A 1961 by-election for the Glasgow Bridgeton constituency was held on Thursday 16 November 1961.

The Labour Party candidate, James Bennett managed to retain the seat for his party, with a majority of 6,995 votes.

The by-election was significant, in that it was one of the first elections in which the Scottish National Party achieved a 19% share of the vote; only narrowly beaten by the Unionist candidate M.McNeill for second place. Although this was not exceptional and did not receive much attention at the time, it was the forerunner of more significant serious success for the SNP later in the 1960s.

By-election 1961: Glasgow Bridgeton
Party	Candidate	Votes	%	±%
Labour	James Bennett	10,930	57.5	−5.9
Unionist	Malcolm McNeill	3,935	20.7	−15.9
SNP	Ian Macdonald	3,549	18.7	New
Ind. Labour Party	George Stone	586	3.1	N/A
Majority		6,995	36.8	+10.0
Turnout		19,000	41.9	−26.6
Labour hold		Swing		
