= George Barker (British politician) =

George Barker (13 March 1858 – 28 October 1936) was a Welsh Labour Party politician.

Born in Hanley, Barker was educated at Norwood National School before joining the Buffs (Royal East Kent Regiment). He served in the Anglo-Zulu War before becoming a coal miner in Abertillery.

Barker became active in the South Wales Miners' Federation, and later served as full-time agent to its Monmouthshire and Western Valleys district. He also served on the executive of the Miners' Federation of Great Britain from 1911 until 1921.

Baker was elected at the member of parliament (MP) for Abertillery at a by-election in 1920, and held the seat until he retired at the 1929 general election. After the defeat of the first Labour government in 1924, Barker was said to have been one of the five members of the PLP who voted against Ramsay Macdonald continuing as Labour Leader. He opposed Macdonald’s Ruhr Settlement which continued German Reparations and, thus, threatened the market for Welsh coal.

Parliament of the United Kingdom
Preceded by William Brace	Member of Parliament for Abertillery; 1920–1929	Succeeded by George Daggar
Trade union offices
Preceded by Michael Roach	Agent for the Monmouth Western Valleys District of the South Wales Miners' Federation; 1908–1920	Succeeded by George Daggar
