= 1965 Abertillery by-election =

UK parliamentary by-election

The 1965 Abertillery by-election of 1 April 1965 was held after the death of Labour MP Llywelyn Williams.

The seat was very safe, having been won at the 1964 United Kingdom general election by over 20,000 votes

== Result of the previous general election ==
General election 1964: Abertillery
Party	Candidate	Votes	%	±%
Labour	Llywelyn Williams	24,204	85.9	+0.9
Conservative	Peter Rees	3,973	14.1	−0.9
Majority		20,231	71.8	+1.8
Turnout		28,177	75.5	−6.4
Registered electors		37,310		
Labour hold		Swing		

== Result ==
1965 Abertillery by-election
Party	Candidate	Votes	%	±%
Labour	Clifford Williams	18,256	79.0	−6.9
Conservative	Peter Rees	3,309	14.3	+0.2
Plaid Cymru	Edward Merriman	1,551	6.7	N/A
Majority		14,947	64.7	−7.1
Turnout		23,116	63.2	−12.3
Registered electors		36,567		
Labour hold		Swing		
