= Glasgow Bridgeton =

Parliamentary constituency in the United Kingdom, 1885–1974

- Former burgh constituency for the House of Commons
- Major settlements: Glasgow

1885–1974
- Seats: One
- Created from: Glasgow
- Replaced by: Glasgow Central, Glasgow Shettleston

Glasgow Bridgeton was a parliamentary constituency in the city of Glasgow. From 1885 to 1974, it returned one Member of Parliament (MP) to the House of Commons of the Parliament of the United Kingdom, elected by the first-past-the-post voting system.

For many years it was represented by James Maxton, the leader of the Independent Labour Party whose policies were to the left of the Labour Party.

== Boundaries ==
The Redistribution of Seats Act 1885 provided that the constituency was to consist of the first and fourth Municipal Wards.

The constituency was described in the Glasgow Parliamentary Divisions Act 1896 as being:

The area within a line beginning at a point in the centre of Albert Bridge, where the same intersects the centre line of the River Clyde, and thence proceeding eastwards along the centre of that river till it meets the parliamentary boundary of the city at Harvie's Dyke; thence northwards along the said parliamentary boundary to the centre of London Road; thence westwards along the centres of London Road and Canning Street to a point opposite the centre of Clyde Street; thence northwards along the centres of Clyde Street and Abercromby Street to the centre of Gallowgate; thence westwards along the centre of Gallowgate to a point opposite the centre of Saltmarket; thence southwards along the centre of Saltmarket to the centre of the River Clyde at the point first described.

In the Representation of the People Act 1918 it was described as:

That portion of the city which is bounded by a line commencing at a point on the centre line of London Road, where the road is crossed by the Caledonian Railway (Glasgow Lines), thence south-westward and southward along the centre line of the said railway to where it joins the Caledonian Railway Branch Line from Dalmarnock to Rutherglen, thence southward along the centre line of the said last-mentioned railway to a point on the municipal boundary at the centre line of the River Clyde, thence south-westward and north-westward along the municipal boundary of the city to a point on the centre line of the River Clyde about 77 yards south-eastward from the centre of Rutherglen Bridge, thence westward, northward and westward along the centre line of the River Clyde to the centre of Albert Bridge thence northward along the centre line of Saltmarket to the centre line of Gallowgate, thence eastward along the centre line of Gallowgate to the centre line of Abercromby Street, thence southwestward along the centre line of Abercromby Street to the centre line of Canning Street, thence eastward along the centre line of Canning Street and London Road to the point of commencement.

The Representation of the People Act 1948 provided that the constituency was to consist of the Calton and Dalmarnock wards of the City of Glasgow. The Parliamentary Constituencies (Scotland) (Glasgow Bridgeton, Glasgow Provan and Glasgow Shettleston) Order, 1955 added to this the portion of the Mile-End ward that had previously been part of the Glasgow Camlachie constituency.

The Parliamentary Constituencies (Scotland) Order 1970 provided that the constituency was to consist of:

The following wards of the county of the city of Glasgow, namely, Calton and Dalmarnock and that part of Mile-End ward which lies to the west of a line commencing at a point on the northern boundary of the ward immediately opposite the centre line of Millerston Street; thence southward to and along the centre line of Millerston Street to the centre line of Gallowgate; thence eastward along the centre line of Gallowgate to a point opposite the centre line of Fielden Street; thence southward along the centre line of Fielden Street to the termination of the line on the southern boundary of the Mile-End ward opposite the centre of Fielden Street.

== Members of Parliament ==
Election	Member	Party
1885	Edward Russell	Liberal
1887 by-election	George Trevelyan	Liberal
1897 by-election	Charles Cameron	Liberal
1900	Charles Dickson	Unionist
1906	James William Cleland	Liberal
1910 (Dec)	MacCallum Scott	Liberal
1916	MacCallum Scott	Coalition Liberal
Jan 1922	MacCallum Scott	National Liberal
1922	James Maxton	Labour
1931	James Maxton	Independent Labour
1946 by-election	James Carmichael	Independent Labour
1947	James Carmichael	Labour
1961 by-election	James Bennett	Labour
1974 (Feb)	constituency abolished	

== Election results ==
=== Elections in the 1880s ===
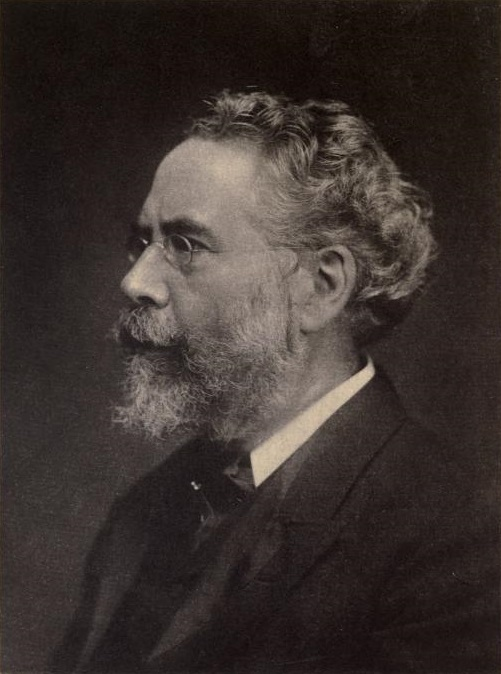
Russell

General election 1885: Glasgow Bridgeton
Party	Candidate	Votes	%
Liberal	Edward Russell	3,601	44.7
Conservative	Elphinstone Vans Agnew Maitland	3,478	43.2
Scottish Land Restoration	William Forsyth	978	12.1
Majority		123	1.5
Turnout		8,057	80.1
Registered electors		10,058	
Liberal win (new seat)			

General election 1886: Glasgow Bridgeton
Party	Candidate	Votes	%	±%
Liberal	Edward Russell	4,364	55.0	+10.3
Conservative	Colin Mackenzie	3,567	45.0	+1.8
Majority		797	10.0	+8.5
Turnout		7,931	78.9	−1.2
Registered electors		10,058		
Liberal hold		Swing	+4.2	

Russell resigned, causing a by-election.

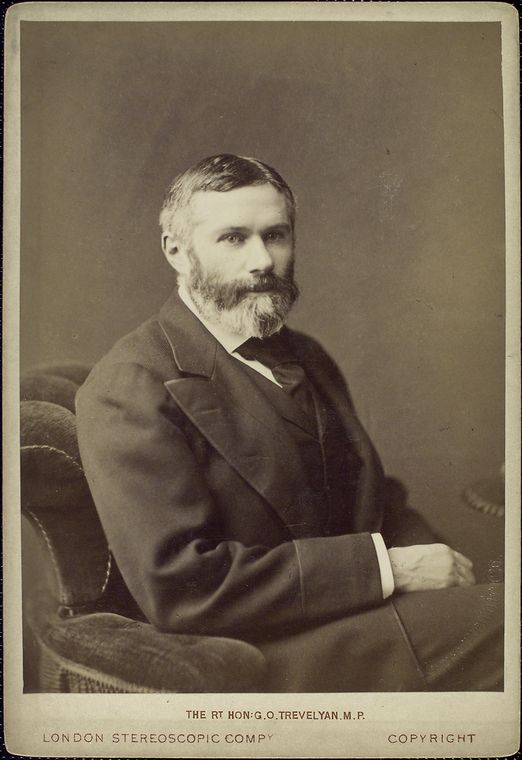
Trevelyan

By-election, 2 Aug 1887: Glasgow Bridgeton
Party	Candidate	Votes	%	±%
Liberal	George Trevelyan	4,654	58.9	+3.9
Liberal Unionist	Evelyn Ashley	3,253	41.1	−3.9
Majority		1,401	17.8	+7.8
Turnout		7,907	78.3	−0.6
Registered electors		10,095		
Liberal hold		Swing	+3.9	

=== Elections in the 1890s ===
General election 1892: Glasgow Bridgeton
Party	Candidate	Votes	%	±%
Liberal	George Trevelyan	4,729	58.5	+3.5
Conservative	William Charles Maughan	3,351	41.5	−3.5
Majority		1,378	17.0	+7.0
Turnout		8,080	76.9	−2.0
Registered electors		10,512		
Liberal hold		Swing	+3.5	

Trevelyan was appointed Secretary for Scotland, requiring a by-election.

By-election, 1892: Glasgow Bridgeton
Party	Candidate	Votes	%	±%
Liberal	George Trevelyan	Unopposed		
Liberal hold				

General election 1895: Glasgow Bridgeton
Party	Candidate	Votes	%	±%
Liberal	George Trevelyan	3,161	48.7	−9.8
Conservative	Charles Dickson	2,719	41.9	+0.4
Ind. Labour Party	James Watson	609	9.4	New
Majority		442	6.8	−10.2
Turnout		6,489	61.9	−15.0
Registered electors		10,481		
Liberal hold		Swing	−5.1	

1897 Glasgow Bridgeton by-election
Party	Candidate	Votes	%	±%
Liberal	Charles Cameron	4,506	50.7	+2.0
Conservative	Charles Dickson	4,381	49.3	+7.4
Majority		125	1.4	−5.4
Turnout		8,887	81.3	+19.4
Registered electors		10,930		
Liberal hold		Swing	-2.7	

=== Elections in the 1900s ===
General election 1900: Glasgow Bridgeton
Party	Candidate	Votes	%	±%
Conservative	Charles Dickson	5,032	55.5	+13.6
Liberal	Alexander Murison	4,041	44.5	−4.2
Majority		991	11.0	N/A
Turnout		4,041	77.5	+15.6
Registered electors		11,706		
Conservative gain from Liberal		Swing	+8.9	

Cleland

General election 1906: Glasgow Bridgeton
Party	Candidate	Votes	%	±%
Liberal	James William Cleland	5,585	58.2	+13.7
Conservative	Charles Dickson	4,019	41.8	−13.7
Majority		1,566	16.4	N/A
Turnout		9,604	84.1	+6.6
Registered electors		11,421		
Liberal gain from Conservative		Swing	+13.7	

=== Elections in the 1910s ===
General election January 1910: Glasgow Bridgeton
Party	Candidate	Votes	%	±%
Liberal	James William Cleland	5,336	60.1	+1.9
Conservative	Patrick Keith Lang	3,539	39.9	−1.9
Majority		1,797	20.2	+3.8
Turnout		8,875	87.5	+3.4
Liberal hold		Swing	+1.9	

General election December 1910: Glasgow Bridgeton
Party	Candidate	Votes	%	±%
Liberal	MacCallum Scott	4,759	55.5	−4.6
Conservative	William Hutchison	3,816	44.5	+4.6
Majority		943	11.0	−9.2
Turnout		8,575	85.6	−1.9
Liberal hold		Swing	-4.6	

General Election 1914–15:

Another General Election was required to take place before the end of 1915. The political parties had been making preparations for an election to take place and by July 1914, the following candidates had been selected;

- Liberal: MacCallum Scott
- Unionist: William Hutchison

James Maxton

General election 1918: Glasgow Bridgeton
Party		Candidate	Votes	%	±%
C	National Liberal	MacCallum Scott	10,887	55.2	−0.3
	Labour	James Maxton	7,860	39.8	New
	Independent	Eunice Murray	991	5.0	New
Majority			3,207	15.4	+4.4
Turnout			19,738	52.0	−33.6
Registered electors			37,980		
	National Liberal hold		Swing		
C indicates candidate endorsed by the coalition government.

- Unionist candidate William Hutchison withdrew when the Coalition Government endorsed the Liberal candidate

=== Elections in the 1920s ===
General election 1922: Glasgow Bridgeton
Party	Candidate	Votes	%	±%
Labour	James Maxton	17,890	63.7	+23.9
National Liberal	MacCallum Scott	10,198	36.3	−18.9
Majority		7,692	27.4	N/A
Turnout		28,088	76.7	+24.7
Registered electors		36,627		
Labour gain from National Liberal		Swing	+21.4	

General election 1923: Glasgow Bridgeton
Party	Candidate	Votes	%	±%
Labour	James Maxton	15,735	64.8	+1.1
Unionist	J. B. Black	6,101	25.1	New
Liberal	Thomas Randall Anderson	2,445	10.1	−26.2
Majority		9,634	39.7	+12.3
Turnout		24,281	66.5	−10.2
Registered electors		36,522		
Labour hold		Swing	+13.7	

General election 1924: Glasgow Bridgeton
Party	Candidate	Votes	%	±%
Labour	James Maxton	16,850	61.3	−3.5
Unionist	Maurice James McCracken	10,633	38.7	+13.6
Majority		6,217	22.6	−17.1
Turnout		27,483	75.1	+8.6
Registered electors		36,571		
Labour hold		Swing	−8.6	

General election 1929: Glasgow Bridgeton
Party	Candidate	Votes	%	±%
Labour	James Maxton	21,033	67.7	+6.4
Unionist	Maurice James McCracken	10,049	32.3	−6.4
Majority		10,984	35.4	+12.8
Turnout		31,082	71.6	−3.5
Registered electors		43,421		
Labour hold		Swing	+6.4	

=== Elections in the 1930s ===
General election 1931: Glasgow Bridgeton
Party	Candidate	Votes	%	±%
Ind. Labour Party	James Maxton	16,630	58.21	
Unionist	Catherine Gavin	11,941	41.79	
Majority		4,689	16.42	N/A
Turnout		28,571		
Ind. Labour Party gain from Labour		Swing		

General election 1935: Glasgow Bridgeton
Party	Candidate	Votes	%	±%
Ind. Labour Party	James Maxton	17,691	64.95	
Unionist	McInnes Shaw	8,951	32.86	
Labour	Samuel McLaren	594	2.18	N/A
Majority		8,740	32.09	
Turnout		27,236		
Ind. Labour Party hold		Swing		

=== Elections in the 1940s ===
General election 1945: Glasgow Bridgeton
Party	Candidate	Votes	%	±%
Ind. Labour Party	James Maxton	13,220	66.4	+1.5
Unionist	Richard Brooman-White	6,695	33.6	+0.7
Majority		6,525	32.8	+0.7
Turnout		19,915	58.4	
Ind. Labour Party hold		Swing		

1946 Glasgow Bridgeton by-election
Party	Candidate	Votes	%	±%
Ind. Labour Party	James Carmichael	6,351	34.3	− 32.1
Labour	John Wheatley	5,180	28.0	New
Unionist	Victor Dunn Warren	3,987	21.6	−15.0
SNP	Wendy Wood	2,575	13.9	New
United Socialist Movement	Guy Aldred	405	2.2	New
Majority		1,171	6.3	−26.5
Turnout		18,498		
Ind. Labour Party hold		Swing		

=== Elections in the 1950s ===
General election 1950: Glasgow Bridgeton
Party	Candidate	Votes	%	±%
Labour	James Carmichael	20,268	59.4	N/A
Unionist	Francis Charles Irwin	11,025	32.3	−1.3
Ind. Labour Party	Robert Duncan	1,974	5.8	−60.6
Communist	D. Kelly	858	2.5	New
Majority		9,243	27.1	N/A
Turnout		34,125	76.9	+18.5
Labour gain from Ind. Labour Party		Swing		

General election 1951: Glasgow Bridgeton
Party	Candidate	Votes	%	±%
Labour	James Carmichael	21,307	63.6	+4.2
Unionist	Richard A. Thomson	10,382	31.0	−1.3
Ind. Labour Party	Robert Duncan	1,796	5.4	−0.4
Majority		10,925	32.6	+5.5
Turnout		33,485	76.9	0.0
Labour hold		Swing		

General election 1955: Glasgow Bridgeton
Party	Candidate	Votes	%	±%
Labour	James Carmichael	20,476	57.7	−5.9
Unionist	Paul Thomas Cowcher	12,375	34.9	+3.9
Ind. Labour Party	George Stone	2,619	7.4	+2.0
Majority		8,101	22.8	−9.8
Turnout		35,470	66.0	−10.9
Labour hold		Swing		

General election 1959: Glasgow Bridgeton
Party	Candidate	Votes	%	±%
Labour	James Carmichael	21,048	63.4	+5.7
Unionist	Iain Docherty	12,139	36.6	+1.7
Majority		8,909	26.8	+4.0
Turnout		33,187	68.5	+2.5
Labour hold		Swing		

=== Elections in the 1960s ===
1961 Glasgow Bridgeton by-election
Party	Candidate	Votes	%	±%
Labour	James Bennett	10,930	57.5	−5.9
Unionist	Malcolm McNeill	3,935	20.7	−15.9
SNP	Ian Macdonald	3,549	18.7	New
Ind. Labour Party	George Stone	586	3.1	N/A
Majority		6,995	36.8	+10.0
Turnout		19,000	41.9	−26.6
Labour hold		Swing		

General election 1964: Glasgow Bridgeton
Party	Candidate	Votes	%	±%
Labour	James Bennett	18,879	71.59	+8.19
Unionist	John Hogg	7,492	28.41	−8.19
Majority		11,387	43.18	+16.38
Turnout		26,371	63.57	−4.93
Registered electors		41,482		
Labour hold		Swing	+8.19	

General election 1966: Glasgow Bridgeton
Party	Candidate	Votes	%	±%
Labour	James Bennett	16,219	74.27	+2.68
Conservative	John Hogg	5,619	25.73	−2.68
Majority		10,600	48.54	+5.36
Turnout		21,838	58.77	−4.80
Registered electors		37,159		
Labour hold		Swing	+2.68	

=== Elections in the 1970s ===
General election 1970: Glasgow Bridgeton
Party	Candidate	Votes	%	±%
Labour	James Bennett	11,056	62.86	−11.41
Conservative	Robert Gavin	3,801	21.61	−4.12
SNP	Gordon E J Wallace	1,550	8.81	New
Independent Protestant	Jack T A Glass	1,180	6.71	New
Majority		7,255	41.25	−7.29
Turnout		15,787	56.26	−1.51
Registered electors		31,262		
Labour hold		Swing	-3.65	
