= James Bennett (British politician) =

British politician (1912–1984)

James Bennett (18 December 1912 – 17 September 1984) was a Scottish Labour Party politician.

He was elected to the House of Commons in 1961 at a by-election in 1961 in the Glasgow Bridgeton constituency, following the resignation of the sitting Labour (formerly ILP) MP James Carmichael.

Bennett held the seat until its abolition at the February 1974 general election.

Parliament of the United Kingdom
| Preceded by James Carmichael | Member of Parliament for Glasgow Bridgeton; 1961–Feb. 1974 | Constituency abolished |
