= Llywelyn Williams =

British politician (1911–1965)

Llywelyn Williams (22 July 1911 – 4 February 1965) was a Welsh Labour Party politician.

Born in Llanelli, Williams was educated at Llanelli Grammar School and Swansea University, after which he became a Congregational minister. He served at Bethesda from 1936 until 1942, and then in Abertillery until 1946, and finally at the Welsh Tabernacle in Kings Cross.

In November 1950 he was elected as member of parliament (MP) for the safe Labour seat of Abertillery in a by-election after the death of sitting MP George Daggar. He was re-elected to the House of Commons at the next four general elections, and died in office, in Newport, in 1965, aged 53.

His daughter, Eryl McNally, was a Labour Member of the European Parliament between 1994 and 2004.

Parliament of the United Kingdom
Preceded by George Daggar	Member of Parliament for Abertillery; 1950–1965	Succeeded by Clifford Williams
