= List of United Kingdom MPs who died in the 1980s =

This is a list of individuals who were former or serving members of parliament for the House of Commons of the United Kingdom who died in the 1980s.

== 1980 ==
Individual	Party	Born	Died	Constituency(ies) represented	Election(s) won
Michael Hughes-Young		28 October 1912	27 December 1980	Wandsworth Central	
William Duthie		22 May 1892	17 December 1980	Banffshire	
Oswald Mosley		16 November 1896	3 December 1980	Oldham Smethwick	1918, 1922, 1923 1926 by-election, 1929
Patrick Gordon Walker		7 April 1907	2 December 1980	Leyton	
Joseph Sweeney		13 June 1897	25 November 1980	West Donegal	
Forbes Hendry		24 October 1908	18 November 1980	West Aberdeenshire	
Richard Law		27 February 1901	15 November 1980	Haltemprice	
Sir Richard Glyn		12 October 1907	24 October 1980	North Dorset	
Evelyn Emmet		18 March 1899	10 October 1980	East Grinstead	
Peter Mahon		4 May 1909	29 September 1980	Preston South	
Raymond Dobson		26 April 1925	22 September 1980	Bristol North East	
Harwood Harrison		6 June 1907	11 September 1980	Eye	
Geoffrey Shakespeare		23 September 1893	8 September 1980	Norwich	
Reginald Manningham-Buller		1 August 1905	7 September 1980	South Northamptonshire	
Joseph Godber		17 March 1914	25 August 1980	Grantham	
Denis Hanley		1 January 1903	10 June 1980	Deptford	
Christopher Peto		19 February 1897	19 May 1980	North Devon	
William Warbey		16 August 1903	6 May 1980	Ashfield	
Alan Dower		28 March 1898	6 May 1980	Penrith and Cockermouth	
Archibald James		1 September 1893	5 May 1980	Wellingborough	
Jocelyn Lucas		27 August 1889	2 May 1980	Portsmouth South	
Thomas McMillan		12 February 1919	30 April 1980	Glasgow Central	
Irene Ward		23 February 1895	26 April 1980	Tynemouth	
Arthur Pearson		31 January 1897	14 April 1980	Pontypridd	
Francis Douglas		21 October 1889	30 March 1980	Battersea North	
Charles Pannell		10 September 1902	23 March 1980	Leeds West	
Charles Wood		3 October 1912	19 March 1980	City of York	
William Mallalieu		18 June 1908	13 March 1980	Huddersfield East	
Harry Becker		16 June 1892	6 March 1980	Richmond (Surrey)	
Michael Astor		10 April 1916	28 February 1980	East Surrey	
Albert Murray		19 January 1930	10 February 1980	Gravesend	
Edith Summerskill		19 April 1901	4 February 1980	Warrington	
Walter D'Arcy Hall		10 August 1891	22 January 1980	Brecon and Radnorshire	
Harry Pursey		1 January 1891	1 January 1980	Kingston upon Hull East	

== 1981 ==
Individual	Party	Born	Died	Constituency(ies) represented	Election(s) won
Robert Bradford		8 June 1941	14 November 1981	Belfast South	
Lionel Heald		7 August 1897	8 November 1981	Chertsey	
David Cecil		9 February 1905	22 October 1981	Peterborough	
Arthur Allen		10 January 1887	8 October 1981	Bosworth	
Graham Page		30 June 1911	1 October 1981	Crosby	
Edward Boyle		31 August 1923	28 September 1981	Birmingham Handsworth	
Henry Spence		22 June 1897	11 September 1981	West Aberdeenshire	
Goronwy Roberts		20 September 1913	23 July 1981	Caernarfon	
Gordon Lang		25 February 1893	20 June 1981	Stalybridge and Hyde	
Robert Taylor		7 December 1932	18 June 1981	Croydon North West	
Geoffrey Stevens		10 November 1902	10 May 1981	Portsmouth Langstone	
Martin Lindsay		22 August 1905	5 May 1981	Solihull	
Bobby Sands		9 March 1954	5 May 1981	Fermanagh and South Tyrone	
Colin Jackson		6 December 1921	19 April 1981	Brighouse and Spenborough	
Will Owen		18 February 1901	3 April 1981	Morpeth	
Nigel Birch		18 November 1906	8 March 1981	West Flintshire	
Frank Maguire		2 September 1929	5 March 1981	Fermanagh and South Tyrone	
Leonard Plugge		21 September 1889	19 February 1981	Chatham	
Derick Heathcoat-Amory		26 December 1899	20 January 1981	Tiverton	
Joseph Sparks		30 September 1901	12 January 1981	Acton	
Malcolm MacDonald		17 August 1901	11 January 1981	Ross and Cromarty	
Tom Litterick		25 May 1929	6 January 1981	Birmingham Selly Oak	
Neill Cooper-Key		26 April 1907	5 January 1981	Hastings	
John Hely-Hutchinson		12 November 1902	1 January 1981	Peterborough	

== 1982 ==
Individual	Party	Born	Died	Constituency(ies) represented	Election(s) won
John Lloyd Williams		1 January 1888	31 December 1982	Glasgow Kelvingrove	
Henry Price		3 January 1911	4 December 1982	Lewisham West	
Hugh O'Neill		8 June 1883	28 November 1982	North Antrim	
Idwal Jones		30 June 1900	18 October 1982	Wrexham	
Philip Noel-Baker		1 November 1889	8 October 1982	Derby South	
William Gordon Bennett		1 January 1900	5 October 1982	Glasgow Woodside	
Frank McElhone		5 April 1929	22 September 1982	Glasgow Queen's Park	
George Chetwynd		14 May 1916	2 September 1982	Stockton-on-Tees	
Harry Lamborn		1 May 1915	21 August 1982	Peckham	
Geoffrey de Freitas		7 April 1913	10 August 1982	Kettering	
Frederick Cundiff		17 November 1895	7 August 1982	Manchester Withington	
Jocelyn Cadbury		3 March 1946	31 July 1982	Birmingham Northfield	
John Cecil-Wright		28 August 1886	14 July 1982	Birmingham Erdington	
Raphael Tuck		5 April 1910	1 July 1982	Watford	
George Herbert	Conservative	23 January 1892	16 June 1982	Rotherham	1931
Ifor Davies		9 June 1910	6 June 1982	Gower	
George Schuster		25 April 1881	5 June 1982	Walsall	
James Dempsey		6 February 1917	12 May 1982	Coatbridge and Airdrie	
Barnett Janner		20 June 1892	4 May 1982	Leicester North West	
Vernon Willey		29 September 1884	30 April 1982	Bradford South	
Anthony Greenwood		14 September 1911	12 April 1982	Rossendale	
Alexander Spearman		2 March 1901	5 April 1982	Scarborough and Whitby	
John Gretton		15 August 1902	26 March 1982	Burton	
Rab Butler		9 December 1902	8 March 1982	Saffron Walden	
John Hare		22 January 1911	7 March 1982	Sudbury and Woodbridge	
Ronald Bell		14 April 1914	27 February 1982	Beaconsfield	
Henry Drummond Wolff		16 July 1899	8 February 1982	Basingstoke	
John Foster		21 February 1903	1 February 1982	Northwich	
Julian Snow		24 February 1910	24 January 1982	Lichfield and Tamworth	
George Pargiter		16 March 1897	16 January 1982	Southall	
Douglas Glover		13 February 1908	15 January 1982	Ormskirk	
Ivor Owen Thomas		5 December 1898	11 January 1982	The Wrekin	
John Cordeaux		23 July 1902	4 January 1982	Nottingham Central	
Tam Galbraith		10 March 1917	2 January 1982	Glasgow Hillhead	
John Howard		1 January 1913	1 January 1982	Southampton Test	
Allan Noble		1 January 1908	1 January 1982	Chelsea	

== 1983 ==
Individual	Party	Born	Died	Constituency(ies) represented	Election(s) won
John Barter	Conservative	6 October 1917	25 September 1964	Ealing North	1955, 1959
Lucy Middleton	Labour	9 May 1894	5 October 1951	Plymouth Sutton	1945, 1950
Geoffrey Clifton-Brown	Conservative	25 July 1899	3 February 1950	Bury St Edmunds	1945
Richard Stanley	Conservative	29 January 1920	10 March 1966	Fylde North	1950, 1951, 1955, 1959, 1964
Russell Kerr	Labour	1 February 1921	13 May 1983	Feltham Feltham and Heston	1966, 1970 1974 I & II, 1979
Tudor Watkins	Labour	9 May 1903	29 May 1970	Brecon and Radnorshire	1945, 1950, 1951, 1955, 1959, 1964, 1966
James Emery	Conservative	1 January 1886	15 June 1945	Salford West	1935
Burnaby Drayson	Conservative	9 March 1913	7 April 1979	Skipton	1945, 1950, 1951, 1955, 1959, 1964, 1966, 1970, 1974 I & II
Wavell Wakefield	Conservative	10 March 1898	15 November 1963	Swindon St Marylebone	1935 1945, 1950, 1951, 1955, 1959
George Wigg	Labour	28 November 1900	30 November 1967	Dudley	1945, 1950, 1951, 1955, 1959, 1964, 1966
Keith Wickenden	Conservative	22 November 1932	13 May 1983	Dorking	1979
Joseph Kinsey	Conservative	28 August 1921	8 February 1974	Birmingham Perry Barr	1970
Henry Scrymgeour-Wedderburn	Unionist	3 May 1902	15 June 1945	Renfrewshire West	1931, 1935
Muriel Nichol	Labour	2 February 1893	3 February 1950	Bradford North	1945
Martin Redmayne	Conservative	16 November 1910	10 March 1966	Rushcliffe	1950, 1951, 1955, 1959, 1964
John Smyth	Conservative	24 October 1893	10 March 1966	Norwood	1950, 1951, 1955, 1959, 1964
Archie Macdonald	Liberal	2 May 1904	5 October 1951	Roxburgh and Selkirk	1950
Harold Mitchell	Conservative	21 May 1900	15 June 1945	Brentford and Chiswick	1931, 1935
Antony Head	Conservative	19 December 1906	2 August 1960	Carshalton	1945, 1950, 1951, 1955, 1959
James Heathcote-Drummond-Willoughby	Conservative	8 December 1907	3 February 1950	Rutland and Stamford	1933 by-election, 1935, 1945
Eddie Milne	Labour	18 October 1915	20 September 1974	Blyth Valley	1960 by-election, 1964, 1966, 1970, 1974 I
Alec Jones	Labour	12 August 1924	20 March 1983	Rhondda West Rhondda	1967 by-election, 1970 1974 I & II, 1979
Michael Noble	Labour	10 March 1935	7 April 1979	Rossendale	October 1974
Alan Lennox-Boyd	Conservative	18 November 1904	8 September 1960	Mid Bedfordshire	1931, 1935, 1945, 1950, 1951, 1955, 1959
Tom Williamson	Labour	2 September 1897	1 March 1948	Brigg	1945
Lancelot Joynson-Hicks	Conservative	10 April 1902	27 June 1958	Chichester	1942 by-election, 1945, 1950, 1951, 1955
George Rogers	Labour	9 December 1906	29 May 1970	Kensington North	1945, 1950, 1951, 1955, 1959, 1964, 1966
Edward Fletcher	Labour	25 February 1911	13 February 1983	Darlington	1964, 1966, 1970, 1974 I & II, 1979
Michael Roberts	Conservative	6 May 1927	10 February 1983	Cardiff North Cardiff North West	1970 1974 I & II, 1979
John Hanbury Martin	Labour	4 April 1890	6 April 1948	Southwark Central	1940 by-election, 1945
John Lockwood	Conservative	1 December 1890	6 May 1955	Hackney Central Romford	1931 1950, 1951, 1955
Vernon Bartlett	Independent Progressive	30 April 1894	3 February 1950	Bridgwater	1938 by-election, 1945
Lester Hutchinson	Labour	13 December 1904	3 February 1950	Manchester Rusholme	1945

== 1984 ==
Individual	Party	Born	Died	Constituency(ies) represented	Election(s) won
Wyndham Davies	Conservative	3 June 1926	4 December 1984	Birmingham Perry Barr	1964
John McQuade	DUP	9 August 1911	19 November 1984	Belfast North	1979
Thomas Jones	Labour	10 February 1898	18 November 1984	Merioneth	1951, 1955, 1959, 1964
Seaborne Davies	Liberal	26 June 1904	26 October 1984	Caernarfon	1945 by-election
Anthony Berry	Conservative	12 February 1925	12 October 1984	Southgate Enfield Southgate	1964, 1966, 1970, 1974 I & II, 1979 1983
Ernest Gates	Conservative	29 May 1903	12 October 1984	Middleton and Prestwich	1940 by-election, 1945, 1950
Conolly Gage	Ulster Unionist	10 November 1905	3 October 1984	Belfast South	1945, 1950, 1951
Gerard Wallop	Conservative	16 May 1898	28 September 1984	Basingstoke	1929, 1931
Granville West	Labour	17 March 1904	23 September 1984	Pontypool	1946 by-election, 1950, 1951, 1955
George Oliver	Labour	24 November 1888	22 September 1984	Ilkeston	1922, 1923, 1924, 1929, 1935, 1945, 1950, 1951, 1955, 1959
Frank Tomney	Labour	24 May 1908	19 September 1984	Hammersmith North	1950, 1951, 1955, 1959, 1964, 1966, 1970, 1974 I & II
Ralph Assheton	Conservative	24 February 1901	18 September 1984	Rushcliffe City of London Blackburn West	1934 by-election, 1935 1945 1950, 1951
James Bennett	Labour	18 December 1912	17 September 1984	Glasgow Bridgeton	1961 by-election, 1964, 1966, 1970
Denis Shipwright	Conservative	20 May 1898	13 September 1984	Penryn and Falmouth	1922
Geoffrey Lloyd	Conservative	17 January 1902	12 September 1984	Birmingham Ladywood Birmingham King's Norton Sutton Coldfield	1931, 1935 1950 1955, 1959, 1964, 1966, 1970
Charles Grey	Labour	25 March 1903	7 September 1984	City of Durham	1945, 1950, 1951, 1955, 1959, 1964, 1966
Frederick Skinnard	Labour	8 March 1902	5 August 1984	Harrow East	1945
Percy Collick	Labour	16 November 1897	24 July 1984	Birkenhead West Birkenhead	1945 1950, 1951, 1955, 1959
Arnold Shaw	Labour	12 July 1909	27 June 1984	Ilford South Ilford South	1966 1974 I & II, 1979
Geoffrey Hirst	Conservative	14 December 1904	18 June 1984	Shipley	1950, 1951, 1955, 1959, 1964, 1966
Sydney Smith	Labour	27 April 1885	12 June 1984	Kingston upon Hull South West	1945
John MacLeod	National Liberal	23 February 1913	3 June 1984	Ross and Cromarty	1945, 1950, 1951, 1955, 1959
Michael Noble	Unionist	19 March 1913	15 May 1984	Argyllshire	1958 by-election, 1959, 1964, 1966, 1970
Bonner Pink	Conservative	30 September 1912	6 May 1984	Portsmouth South	1966, 1970, 1974 I & II, 1979
Ronald Bray	Conservative	5 January 1922	22 April 1984	Rossendale	1970, 1974 I
Edward Bishop	Labour	3 October 1920	19 April 1984	Newark	1964, 1966, 1970, 1974 I & II
Walter Padley	Labour	24 July 1916	15 April 1984	Ogmore	1950, 1951, 1955, 1959, 1964, 1966, 1970, 1974 I & II
Richard Kelley	Labour	24 July 1904	1 April 1984	Don Valley	1959, 1964, 1966, 1970, 1974 I & II
Henry Brooke	Conservative	9 April 1903	29 March 1984	Lewisham West Hampstead	1938 by-election 1950, 1951, 1955, 1959, 1964
George Grant	Labour	11 October 1924	27 March 1984	Morpeth	1970, 1974 I & II, 1979
Maurice Macmillan	Conservative	27 January 1921	10 March 1984	Halifax Farnham South West Surrey	1955, 1959 1945 1950, 1951
Hugh Fraser	Conservative	23 January 1918	6 March 1984	Stone Stafford and Stone Stafford	1945 1950, 1951, 1955, 1959, 1964, 1966, 1970, 1974 I & II, 1979 1983
Ioan Evans	Labour	10 July 1927	10 February 1984	Birmingham Yardley Aberdare Cynon Valley	1964, 1966 1974 I & II, 1979 1983
Gerald Palmer	Conservative	9 June 1904	7 February 1984	Winchester	1935
Frank Byers	Liberal	24 July 1915	6 February 1984	North Dorset	1945
Frederick Lee	Labour	3 August 1906	4 February 1984	Manchester Hulme Newton	1945 1950, 1951, 1955, 1959, 1964, 1966, 1970
Seán MacEntee	Sinn Féin	22 August 1889	10 January 1984	South Monaghan	1918
Harry Selby	Labour	18 May 1913	8 January 1984	Glasgow Govan	1974 I & II, 1979
Kenneth Thompson	Conservative	24 December 1909	4 January 1984	Liverpool Walton	1950, 1951, 1955, 1959
William Henderson	Labour	8 August 1891	1 January 1984	Enfield	1923, 1929

== 1985 ==
Individual	Party	Born	Died	Constituency(ies) represented	Election(s) won
Neil Marten	Conservative	3 December 1916	22 December 1985	Banbury	1959, 1964, 1966, 1970, 1974 I & II, 1979
Thomas Urwin	Labour	9 June 1912	14 December 1985	Houghton-le-Spring	1964, 1966, 1970, 1974 I & II, 1979
Peter Bessell	Liberal	24 August 1921	27 November 1985	Bodmin	1964, 1966
Frances Davidson	Conservative	29 May 1894	25 November 1985	Hemel Hempstead	1937 by-election, 1945, 1950, 1951, 1955
Hugh Lucas-Tooth	Conservative	13 January 1903	18 November 1985	Isle of Ely Hendon South	1924 1945, 1950, 1951, 1955, 1959, 1964, 1966
Harold Davies	Labour	31 July 1904	28 October 1985	Leek	1945, 1950, 1951, 1955, 1959, 1964, 1966
George Darling	Labour	20 July 1905	18 October 1985	Sheffield Hillsborough	1950, 1951, 1955, 1959, 1964, 1966, 1970
George Odey	Conservative	21 April 1900	16 October 1985	Howdenshire Beverley	1947 by-election 1950, 1951
Harry Cowans	Labour	19 December 1932	3 October 1985	Newcastle-upon-Tyne Central Tyne Bridge	1976 by-election, 1979 1983
Tatton Brinton	Conservative	4 January 1916	26 September 1985	Kidderminster	1964, 1966, 1970
John Kerans	Conservative	30 June 1915	12 September 1985	The Hartlepools	1959
James Pitman	Conservative	14 August 1901	1 September 1985	Bath	1945, 1950, 1951, 1955, 1959
Alan Fitch	Labour	10 March 1915	7 August 1985	Wigan	1958 by-election, 1959, 1964, 1966, 1970, 1974 I & II, 1979
William Anstruther-Gray	Unionist	5 March 1905	6 August 1985	North Lanarkshire Berwick and East Lothian	1931, 1935 1951, 1955, 1959, 1964
Maurice Petherick	Conservative	5 October 1894	4 August 1985	Penryn and Falmouth	1931, 1935
Oliver Simmonds	Conservative	22 November 1897	26 July 1985	Birmingham Duddeston	1931, 1935
Arthur Champion	Labour	26 July 1897	26 July 1985	South Derbyshire South East Derbyshire	1945 1950, 1951, 1955
Peter Roberts	Labour	23 June 1912	22 July 1985	Sheffield Ecclesall Sheffield Heeley	1945 1950, 1951, 1955, 1959, 1964
Derrick Gunston	Unionist	26 February 1891	13 July 1985	Thornbury	1924, 1929, 1931, 1935
Thomas Galbraith	Unionist	20 March 1891	12 July 1985	Glasgow Pollok	1940 by-election, 1945, 1950, 1951
Patricia Hornsby-Smith	Conservative	17 March 1914	3 July 1985	Chislehurst Chislehurst	1950, 1951, 1955, 1959, 1964 1970
Samuel Segal	Labour	2 April 1902	4 June 1985	Preston	1945
George Brown	Labour	2 September 1914	2 June 1985	Belper	1945, 1950, 1951, 1955, 1959, 1964, 1966
Leslie Hale	Labour	13 July 1902	9 May 1985	Oldham Oldham West	1945 1950, 1951, 1955, 1959, 1964, 1966
Tom Hooson	Conservative	16 March 1933	8 May 1985	Brecon and Radnorshire	1979, 1983
Max Aitken	Conservative	15 February 1910	30 April 1985	Holborn	1945
James Dunn	Labour	30 January 1926	27 April 1985	Liverpool Kirkdale	1964, 1966, 1970, 1974 I & II, 1979
Owen Temple-Morris	Conservative	15 September 1896	21 April 1985	Cardiff East	1931, 1935
Clavering Fison	Conservative	11 December 1892	13 April 1985	Woodbridge	1929
Cecil Manning	Labour	23 May 1892	12 April 1985	Camberwell North	1944 by-election, 1945
Joseph Symonds	Labour	17 January 1900	29 March 1985	Whitehaven	1959, 1964, 1966
Robert Young	Labour	28 May 1891	20 March 1985	Islington North	1929
Alan Beaney	Labour	3 March 1905	3 March 1985	Hemsworth	1959, 1964, 1966, 1970
Alfred Martyn Williams	Conservative	14 May 1897	1 March 1985	North Cornwall	1924
Dan Jones	Labour	26 September 1908	19 February 1985	Burnley	1959, 1964, 1966, 1970, 1974 I & II, 1979
Douglas Johnston	Labour	1 February 1907	18 February 1985	Paisley	1948 by-election, 1950, 1951, 1955, 1959
Joseph Hale	Labour	28 October 1913	7 February 1985	Rochdale	1950
Harry Hynd	Labour	4 July 1900	1 February 1985	Hackney Central Accrington	1945 1950, 1951, 1955, 1959, 1964
David Ormsby-Gore	Conservative	20 May 1918	26 January 1985	Oswestry	1950, 1951, 1955, 1959

== 1986 ==
Individual	Party	Born	Died	Constituency(ies) represented	Election(s) won
Harold Macmillan	Conservative	10 February 1894	29 December 1986	Stockton-on-Tees Stockton-on-Tees Bromley	1924 1931, 1935 1945, 1950, 1951, 1955, 1959
Guy Barnett	Labour	23 August 1928	24 December 1986	South Dorset Greenwich	1962 South Dorset by-election 1971 by-election, 1974 I & II, 1979, 1983
David Penhaligon	Liberal	6 June 1944	22 December 1986	Truro	1974 II, 1979, 1983
David James	Conservative	25 December 1919	15 December 1986	Brighton Kemptown North Dorset	1959 1970, 1974 I & II
Neil McLean	Unionist	28 November 1918	17 November 1986	Inverness	1954 by-election, 1955, 1959
Arthur Duckworth	Conservative	3 January 1901	14 November 1986	Shrewsbury	1929, 1931, 1935
Simon Mahon	Labour	4 April 1914	19 October 1986	Bootle	1955, 1959, 1964, 1966, 1970, 1974 I & II
Don Bennett	Liberal	14 September 1910	15 September 1986	Middlesbrough West	1945 by-election
Philip Bell	Conservative	10 January 1900	12 September 1986	Bolton East	1951, 1955, 1959
Spencer Le Marchant	Conservative	15 January 1931	7 September 1986	High Peak	1970, 1974 I & II, 1979
Horace King, Baron Maybray-King	Labour	25 May 1901	3 September 1986	Southampton Test Southampton Itchen	1950, 1951 1955, 1959, 1964, 1966
John Maude	Conservative	3 April 1901	16 August 1986	Exeter	1945, 1950
John Binns	Labour	1 June 1914	6 August 1986	Keighley	1964, 1966
Robert Boothby, Baron Boothby	Conservative	12 February 1900	16 July 1986	Aberdeen and Kincardine East East Aberdeenshire	1924, 1929, 1931, 1935, 1945 1950, 1951, 1955
Richard Crawshaw	Labour	25 September 1917	16 July 1986	Liverpool Toxteth	1964, 1966, 1970, 1974 I & II, 1979
Sir John Mellor, 2nd Baronet	Conservative	6 July 1893	15 July 1986	Tamworth Sutton Coldfield	1935 1945, 1950, 1951
C. W. Armstrong	Ulster Unionist	9 May 1899	8 July 1986	Armagh	1954 by-election, 1955
Robert Ryder	Conservative	16 February 1908	29 June 1986	Merton and Morden	1950
Frank Cousins	Labour	8 September 1904	11 June 1986	Nuneaton	1965 by-election, 1966
Albert Cooper	Conservative	23 September 1910	12 May 1986	Ilford South	1950, 1951, 1955, 1959, 1964, 1970
Manny Shinwell	Labour	18 October 1884	8 May 1986	Linlithgowshire Linlithgowshire Seaham Easington	1922, 1923 1928 by-election, 1929 1935, 1945 1950, 1951, 1955, 1959, 1964, 1966
Victor Raikes	Conservative	19 January 1901	18 April 1986	South East Essex Liverpool Wavertree Liverpool Garston	1931, 1935 1945 1950, 1951, 1955
John Spence	Conservative	7 December 1920	4 March 1986	Sheffield Heeley Thirsk and Malton Ryedale	1970 1974 I & II, 1979 1983
Thomas Williams	Labour and Co-op	22 September 1915	28 February 1986	Hammersmith South Barons Court Warrington	1949 by-election, 1950, 1951 1955 1961 by-election, 1964, 1966, 1970, 1974 I & II, 1979
Otho Prior-Palmer	Conservative	28 October 1897	21 January 1986	Worthing	1945, 1950, 1951, 1955, 1959
Martin Stevens	Conservative	31 July 1929	10 January 1986	Fulham	1979, 1983
Sir John Barlow, 2nd Baronet	Conservative	15 June 1898	5 January 1986	Eddisbury Middleton and Prestwich	1945 1951, 1955, 1959, 1964
John Cronin	Labour	1 March 1916	3 January 1986	Loughborough	1955, 1959, 1964, 1966, 1970, 1974 I & II

== 1987 ==
Individual	Party	Born	Died	Constituency(ies) represented	Election(s) won
John Astor	Conservative	26 September 1923	27 December 1987	Newbury	1964, 1966, 1970
Fred Willey	Labour	13 November 1910	13 December 1987	Sunderland Sunderland North	1945 1950, 1951, 1955, 1959, 1964, 1966, 1970, 1974 I & II, 1979
Ralph Etherton	Conservative	11 February 1904	10 December 1987	Stretford	1939 by-election
Robert Bean	Labour	5 September 1935	7 December 1987	Rochester and Chatham	1974 II
Duncan Sandys	Conservative	24 January 1908	26 November 1987	Norwood Streatham	1935 1950, 1951, 1955, 1959, 1964, 1966
John Parker	Labour	15 July 1906	24 November 1987	Romford Dagenham	1935 1945, 1950, 1951, 1955, 1959, 1964, 1966, 1970, 1974 I & II, 1979
Roger Fleetwood-Hesketh	Conservative	28 July 1902	14 November 1987	Southport	1952 by-election, 1951, 1955
Ian Fraser	Conservative	14 October 1916	8 November 1987	Plymouth Sutton	1959, 1964
Jasper More	Conservative	1 July 1907	28 October 1987	Ludlow	1960 by-election, 1964, 1966, 1970, 1974 I & II
Billy Blyton	Labour	2 May 1899	25 October 1987	Houghton-le-Spring	1945, 1950, 1951, 1955, 1959
Niall Macpherson	National Liberal	3 August 1908	11 October 1987	Dumfriesshire	1945, 1950, 1951, 1955, 1959
Henry Studholme	Conservative	13 June 1899	9 October 1987	Tavistock	1942 by-election, 1945, 1950, 1951, 1955, 1959, 1964
Rolf Dudley-Williams	Conservative	17 June 1908	8 October 1987	Exeter	1951, 1955, 1959, 1964
Eric Gandar Dower	Conservative	1 January 1894	4 October 1987	Caithness and Sutherland	1945
Guy Lloyd	Unionist	7 August 1890	22 September 1987	East Renfrewshire	1940 by-election, 1945, 1950, 1951, 1955
Greville Howard	National Liberal	7 September 1909	20 September 1987	St Ives	1950, 1951, 1955, 1959, 1964
Christopher Soames	Conservative	12 October 1920	16 September 1987	Bedford	1950, 1951, 1955, 1959, 1964
Hervey Rhodes	Labour	12 August 1895	11 September 1987	Ashton-under-Lyne	1945, 1950, 1951, 1955, 1959
James d'Avigdor-Goldsmid	Conservative	19 December 1912	6 September 1987	Lichfield and Tamworth	1970, 1974 I
Dorothy Rees	Labour	29 July 1898	20 August 1987	Barry	1950
Frank Beswick	Labour	21 August 1911	17 August 1987	Uxbridge	1945, 1950, 1951, 1955
Frederick Burden	Conservative	27 December 1905	6 July 1987	Gillingham	1950, 1951, 1955, 1959, 1964, 1966, 1970, 1974 I & II, 1979
George Willis	Labour	7 March 1903	2 June 1987	Edinburgh North Edinburgh East	1945 1954 by-election, 1955, 1959, 1964, 1966
Hugh Linstead	Conservative	3 February 1901	27 May 1987	Putney	1942 by-election, 1945, 1950, 1951, 1955, 1959
Ronald Chamberlain	Labour	19 April 1901	12 May 1987	Norwood	1945
Dudley Ryder	Conservative	11 October 1892	7 May 1987	Shrewsbury	1922, 1924
William Wilkins	Labour	17 January 1899	6 May 1987	Bristol South	1945, 1950, 1951, 1955, 1959, 1964, 1966
David Weitzman	Labour	18 June 1898	6 May 1987	Stoke Newington Hackney North and Stoke Newington	1945 1950, 1951, 1955, 1959, 1964, 1966, 1970, 1974 I & II
John Silkin (in office)	Labour	18 March 1923	26 April 1987	Deptford Lewisham Deptford	1963 by-election, 1964, 1966, 1970 1974 I & II, 1979, 1983
Harry Gourlay (in office)	Labour	10 July 1916	20 April 1987	Kirkcaldy Burghs Kirkcaldy	1959, 1964, 1966, 1970 1974 I & II, 1979, 1983
Alfred Evans	Labour	24 February 1914	13 April 1987	Caerphilly	1968 by-election, 1970, 1974 I & II
Edward Carson	Conservative	17 February 1920	6 March 1987	Isle of Thanet	1945, 1950, 1951
Albert Costain	Conservative	5 July 1910	5 March 1987	Folkestone and Hythe	1959, 1964, 1966, 1970, 1974 I & II, 1979
David Ensor	Labour	27 November 1906	5 February 1987	Bury and Radcliffe	1964, 1966
Graeme Finlay	Conservative	29 October 1917	21 January 1987	Epping	1951, 1955, 1959
Ian Harvey	Conservative	25 January 1914	10 January 1987	Harrow East	1950, 1951, 1955
Robert Cooke	Conservative	29 May 1930	6 January 1987	Bristol West	1957 by-election, 1959, 1964, 1966, 1970, 1974 I & II
William Hannan	Labour	30 August 1906	1 January 1987	Glasgow Maryhill	1945, 1950, 1951, 1955, 1959, 1964, 1966, 1970
William Steward	Conservative	20 April 1901	1 January 1987	Woolwich West	1950, 1951, 1955
Clifford Williams	Labour	28 June 1905	1 January 1987	Abertillery	1965 by-election, 1966
John Robertson	Labour	3 February 1913	1 January 1987	Paisley	1961 by-election, 1964, 1966, 1970, 1974 I & II

== 1988 ==
Individual	Party	Born	Died	Constituency(ies) represented	Election(s) won
Loel Guinness	Conservative	9 June 1906	31 December 1988	Bath	1931, 1935
Brynmor John (in office)	Labour	18 April 1934	13 December 1988	Pontypridd	1970, 1974 I & II, 1979, 1983, 1987
John Baker White	Conservative	12 August 1902	10 December 1988	Canterbury	1945, 1950, 1951
Walter Perkins	Conservative	3 June 1903	8 December 1988	Stroud Stroud and Thornbury	1931, 1935 1950, 1951
Albert Evans	Labour	10 June 1903	4 December 1988	Islington South West	1950, 1951, 1955, 1959, 1964, 1966
Tom Fraser	Labour	18 February 1911	21 November 1988	Hamilton	1943 by-election, 1945, 1950, 1951, 1955, 1959, 1964, 1966
Jennie Lee	Labour	3 November 1904	16 November 1988	North Lanarkshire Cannock	1929 1945, 1950, 1951, 1955, 1959, 1964, 1966
Donald Wade	Liberal	16 June 1904	6 November 1988	Huddersfield West	1950, 1951, 1955, 1959
Basil de Ferranti	Conservative	2 July 1930	24 September 1988	Morecambe and Lonsdale	1958 by-election, 1959
Harold Balfour	Conservative	1 November 1897	21 September 1988	Isle of Thanet	1929, 1931, 1935
John Biggs-Davison (in office)	Conservative	7 June 1918	17 September 1988	Chigwell Epping Forest	1955, 1959, 1964, 1966, 1970 1974 I & II, 1979, 1983, 1987
Walter Elliot	Conservative	17 February 1910	8 September 1988	Carshalton	1960 by-election, 1964, 1966, 1970
Jack Cooper	Labour	7 June 1908	2 September 1988	Deptford	1950
Fred Peart	Labour	30 April 1914	26 August 1988	Workington	1945, 1950, 1951, 1955, 1959, 1964, 1966, 1970, 1974 I & II
Patrick Donner	Conservative	4 December 1904	19 August 1988	Islington West Basingstoke	1931 1935, 1945, 1950, 1951
Samuel Silkin	Labour	6 March 1918	17 August 1988	Dulwich	1964, 1966, 1970, 1974 I & II, 1979
John Wheatley	Labour	17 January 1908	28 July 1988	Edinburgh East	1947 by-election, 1945, 1950, 1951
George Ward	Conservative	20 November 1907	15 June 1988	Worcester	1945, 1950, 1951, 1955, 1959
Willie Ross	Labour	7 April 1911	10 June 1988	Kilmarnock	1946 by-election, 1950, 1951, 1955, 1959, 1964, 1966, 1970, 1974 I & II
Brandon Rhys-Williams (in office)	Conservative	14 November 1927	18 May 1988	Kensington South Kensington and Chelsea Kensington	1968 by-election, 1970 1974 I & II, 1979 1983, 1987
Dan Frankel	Labour	18 August 1900	16 May 1988	Mile End	1935
Fenner Brockway	Labour	1 November 1888	29 April 1988	Leyton East Eton and Slough	1929 1950, 1951, 1955, 1959
John Stonehouse	Labour	28 July 1925	14 April 1988	Wednesbury Walsall North	1957 by-election, 1959, 1964, 1966, 1970 1974 I & II
Cecil Ramage	Liberal	17 January 1895	22 February 1988	Newcastle upon Tyne West	1923
Stephen Taylor	Labour	30 December 1910	1 February 1988	Barnet	1945
Anthony Courtney	Conservative	16 May 1908	24 January 1988	Harrow East	1959 by-election, 1959, 1964
Kenneth Marks	Labour	15 June 1920	13 January 1988	Manchester Gorton	1967 by-election, 1970, 1974 I & II, 1979

== 1989 ==
Individual	Party	Born	Died	Constituency(ies) represented	Election(s) won
Muriel Gammans	Conservative	6 March 1898	28 December 1989	Hornsey	1957 (by-election), 1959, 1964
Walter Bromley-Davenport	Conservative	15 September 1903	26 December 1989	Knutsford	1945, 1950, 1951, 1955, 1959, 1964, 1966
John Heddle (in office)	Labour	15 September 1943	19 December 1989	Lichfield and Tamworth Mid Staffordshire	1979 1983, 1987
George Harvie-Watt	Conservative	23 August 1903	18 December 1989	Richmond (Surrey)	1937 by-election, 1945, 1950, 1951, 1955
Sydney Irving	Labour	1 July 1918	18 December 1989	Dartford	1955, 1959, 1964, 1966 1974 I & II
Laurie Pavitt	Labour	1 February 1914	14 December 1989	Willesden West Brent South	1959, 1964, 1966, 1970 1974 I & II, 1979, 1983
David Hardman	Labour	18 October 1901	6 December 1989	Darlington	1945, 1950
George Machin	Labour	30 December 1922	5 December 1989	Dundee East	1973 by-election
Elwyn Jones, Baron Elwyn-Jones	Labour	24 October 1909	4 December 1989	West Ham Plaistow West Ham South Newham South	1945 1950, 1951, 1955, 1959, 1964, 1966, 1970 1974 I
Joseph Hiley	Conservative	18 August 1902	17 November 1989	Pudsey	1959, 1964, 1966, 1970
Alexander Fletcher	Conservative	26 August 1929	18 September 1989	Edinburgh North Edinburgh Central	1973 by-election, 1974 I & II, 1979 1983
Anthony Trafford, Baron Trafford	Conservative	20 July 1932	16 September 1989	The Wrekin	1970
Eric Bailey	Conservative	28 July 1905	12 September 1989	Manchester Gorton	1931
Michael Fidler	Conservative	10 February 1916	5 September 1989	Bury and Radcliffe	1970
Godfrey Lagden	Conservative	12 April 1906	31 August 1989	Hornchurch	1955, 1959, 1964
Charles Hill, Baron Hill of Luton	National Liberal	15 January 1904	22 August 1989	Luton	1950, 1951, 1955, 1959
H. Montgomery Hyde	Ulster Unionist	14 August 1907	10 August 1989	Belfast North	1950, 1951, 1955
William Elwyn Jones	Labour	5 January 1904	4 July 1989	Conwy	1950
William Fletcher-Vane	Conservative	12 April 1909	22 June 1989	Westmorland	1945, 1950, 1951, 1955, 1959
Mabel Ridealgh	Labour	11 August 1898	20 June 1989	Ilford North	1945
John Brewis	Conservative	8 April 1920	25 May 1989	Galloway	1959, 1964, 1966, 1970
George Lambert	National Liberal	27 November 1909	24 May 1989	Torrington	1950, 1951, 1955
John Fletcher-Cooke	Conservative	8 August 1911	19 May 1989	Southampton Test	1964
Jeffrey Thomas	Labour	12 November 1933	17 May 1989	Abertillery	1970, 1974 I & II, 1979
William Woolley	National Liberal	17 March 1901	11 May 1989	Spen Valley	1940 by-election
Roland Robinson, 1st Baron Martonmere	Conservative	22 February 1907	3 May 1989	Widnes Blackpool Blackpool South	1931 1935 1945, 1950, 1951, 1955, 1959
Harold Gurden	Conservative	28 June 1903	27 April 1989	Birmingham Selly Oak	1955, 1959, 1964, 1966, 1970, 1974 I
Tufton Beamish	Conservative	27 January 1917	6 April 1989	Lewes	1945, 1950, 1951, 1955, 1959, 1964, 1966, 1970
Charles Taylor	Conservative	10 April 1910	29 March 1989	Eastbourne	1935 by-election, 1935, 1945, 1950, 1951, 1955, 1959, 1964, 1966, 1970
Bob McTaggart (in office)	Labour	2 November 1945	23 March 1989	Glasgow Central	1980 by-election, 1983, 1987
Raymond Gower (in office)	Conservative	15 August 1916	22 February 1989	Barry Vale of Glamorgan	1951, 1955, 1959, 1964, 1966, 1970, 1974 I & II, 1979 1983, 1987
Constance Monks	Conservative	20 May 1911	4 February 1989	Chorley	1970
William Homewood	Labour	17 March 1920	13 January 1989	Kettering	1979
Thelma Cazalet-Keir	Conservative	28 May 1899	13 January 1989	Islington East	1931, 1935
Gerald Williams	Conservative	1 January 1903	1 January 1989	Tonbridge	1945, 1950, 1951, 1955

== See also ==
- List of United Kingdom MPs who died in the 1990s
- List of United Kingdom MPs who died in the 2000s
- List of United Kingdom MPs who died in the 2010s
- List of United Kingdom MPs who died in the 2020s
