= Anthony Barber =

British politician (1920–2005)

The Right Honourable The Lord Barber PC DL TD
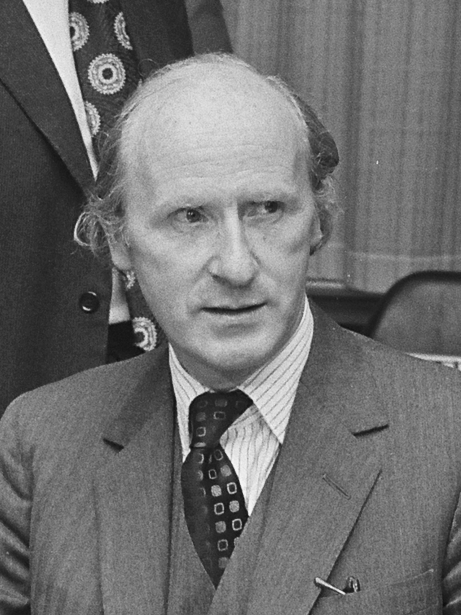
- Barber in 1973

Chancellor of the Exchequer
- In office 25 July 1970 – 4 March 1974
- Prime Minister: Edward Heath
- Preceded by: Iain Macleod
- Succeeded by: Denis Healey

Chancellor of the Duchy of Lancaster
- In office 20 June 1970 – 25 July 1970
- Prime Minister: Edward Heath
- Preceded by: George Thomson
- Succeeded by: Geoffrey Rippon

Chairman of the Conservative Party
- In office 10 January 1967 – 20 June 1970
- Leader: Edward Heath
- Preceded by: Edward du Cann
- Succeeded by: Peter Thomas

Minister of Health
- In office 20 October 1963 – 16 October 1964
- Prime Minister: Alec Douglas-Home
- Preceded by: Enoch Powell
- Succeeded by: Kenneth Robinson
Junior ministerial offices
Financial Secretary to the Treasury
In office 16 July 1962 – 20 October 1963
Prime Minister	Harold Macmillan
Preceded by	Edward Boyle
Succeeded by	Alan Green
Economic Secretary to the Treasury
In office 22 October 1959 – 16 July 1962
Prime Minister	Harold Macmillan
Preceded by	Frederick Erroll
Succeeded by	Edward du Cann
Parliamentary Private Secretary to the Prime Minister
In office 10 January 1957 – 22 October 1959
Prime Minister	Harold Macmillan
Preceded by	Robert Allan
Succeeded by	Knox Cunningham
Shadow Cabinet offices
Shadow Minister for Power
In office 19 April 1966 – 22 February 1967
Leader	Edward Heath
Preceded by	John Peyton
Succeeded by	Keith Joseph
Shadow President of the Board of Trade Shadow Secretary of State for Trade
In office 16 February 1965 – 22 February 1967
Leader	Edward Heath
Preceded by	Edward du Cann
Succeeded by	Keith Joseph
Parliamentary offices
Member of the House of Lords
Lord Temporal
Life peerage 6 January 1975 – 16 December 2005
Member of Parliament for Altrincham and Sale
In office 4 February 1965 – 20 September 1974
Preceded by	Frederick Erroll
Succeeded by	Fergus Montgomery
Member of Parliament for Doncaster
In office 25 October 1951 – 25 September 1964
Preceded by	Ray Gunter
Succeeded by	Harold Walker

Personal details
- Born: Anthony Perrinott Lysberg Barber; 4 July 1920 Kingston upon Hull, England
- Died: 16 December 2005 (aged 85) Ipswich, England
- Party: Conservative
- Spouses: Jean Asquith (m. 1950; died 1983) Rosemary Youens (m. 1989)
- Children: 2
- Relatives: Noel Barber (brother)
- Education: University of London; Oriel College, Oxford; Middle Temple

Military service
- Allegiance: United Kingdom
- Branch/service: British Army; Royal Air Force
- Years of service: 1939−1945
- Rank: Lieutenant; Pilot officer
- Unit: Royal Artillery; No. 1 Photographic Reconnaissance Unit RAF
- Battles/wars: Second World War (POW)

Anthony Perrinott Lysberg Barber, Baron Barber, TD, PC, DL (4 July 1920 – 16 December 2005) was a British Conservative politician who served as Chancellor of the Exchequer from 1970 to 1974.

After serving in both the Territorial Army and the Royal Air Force during the Second World War, Barber studied at Oxford and became a barrister. Elected as MP for Doncaster in 1951, Barber served in government under Harold Macmillan as Economic Secretary to the Treasury and Financial Secretary to the Treasury, before being appointed Minister of Health by Alec Douglas-Home in 1963. After losing his seat in 1964, he won the 1965 by-election in Altrincham and Sale and returned to Parliament.

Barber was appointed as Chancellor of the Exchequer by Edward Heath in 1970, and oversaw a major liberalisation of the banking system, replaced purchase tax and Selective Employment Tax with Value Added Tax, and also relaxed exchange controls. During his term the economy suffered due to stagflation and industrial unrest, including a miners strike which led to the Three-Day Week. In 1972 he delivered a budget which was designed to return the Conservatives to power in an election expected in 1974 or 1975. This budget led to a brief period of growth known as "The Barber Boom," followed by a wage-price spiral and high inflation, culminating in the 1976 sterling crisis. He was forced to introduce anti-inflation measures, along with a Price Commission and a Pay Board. After the Conservatives lost the first general election of 1974, he did not stand in the second election of that year.

== Birth and early life ==
Barber was born on 4 July 1920 in Kingston upon Hull. He was the third son of John Barber and his Danish wife, Musse. Barber's unusual middle names arose from his mother, who contributed the "Lysberg", and French grandmother, who contributed the "Perrinott". His father was company secretary and director of a Doncaster confectionery works. He had two brothers: Noel, who became a journalist and novelist, and Kenneth, who became company secretary of Midland Bank.

Barber was educated at King Edward VI Grammar School in Retford, Nottinghamshire. He became an articled clerk in a solicitors' firm, but joined the King's Own Yorkshire Light Infantry shortly before the Second World War started. He was commissioned into the Territorial Army Royal Artillery in 1939 and served in France with a unit from Doncaster as part of the British Expeditionary Force. He was evacuated from Dunkirk in 1940, but later he became a pilot in the Photographic Reconnaissance Unit of the RAF. He ran out of fuel on a reconnaissance mission on 25 January 1942 and ditched near Mont St Jean, and was captured by the Germans.

He was mentioned in dispatches for helping escapees from the prison camp at Stalag Luft III; he himself once escaped as far as Denmark. His PoW experiences were recalled by his friend and fellow RAF pilot PoW Thomas D. Calnan who met Barber at Oflag IX-A/H at Spangenberg in February 1942:

"Complete uniforms were rare in our party, the one outstanding exception belonging to Tony Barber, who was resplendent in an Army lieutenant's uniform, complete with Sam Browne."

Barber is a prominent figure throughout Calnan's book:

"It was natural that Charles Hall, Tony Barber and I should plot escape together. We had known one another at Benson, before being shot down and we still felt that we all belonged to the same unit."

Barber also wrote a brief foreword to this volume: "What has struck me most forcibly is how, after more than twenty years, he has recounted our adventures with such accuracy. He has managed to make a reality, once again, of the hopes and fears, the depression and the excitement which, for most of us who were there, now seems more like a dream."

While still a prisoner, Barber took a law degree with first-class honours from the University of London, through the International Red Cross. On his return to England, he was awarded a state grant to Oxford University, where he took a degree in Philosophy, politics and economics in two years at Oriel College, and a scholarship to the Inner Temple. He then practised as a barrister from 1948, and specialised in taxation. From 1967 to 1970 he was chairman of Redfearn National Glass, with which his wife Jean's family was connected.

== House of Commons ==
Anthony Barber stood in Doncaster at the 1950 general election but lost by 878 votes. He contested the seat again at the 1951 general election, however, and beat the incumbent Labour Member of Parliament, Raymond Gunter by 384 votes. He held a series of offices: Parliamentary private secretary to George Ward (Under Secretary for Air) from 1952 to 1958; junior Government whip from 1955 to 1958; and Parliamentary Private Secretary to the Prime Minister, Harold Macmillan from 1958 to 1959. He then served four years as a junior minister in the Treasury, Economic Secretary to the Treasury from 1959 to 1962, and, following the "Night of the Long Knives" on 13 July 1962, as Financial Secretary to the Treasury from 1962 to 1963 (under the Chancellorships of Derick Heathcoat Amory, Selwyn Lloyd and Reginald Maudling). He became a Cabinet minister, as Minister of Health, in 1963, but lost his seat in the Commons in the 1964 general election to Labour's Harold Walker.

His absence from Parliament was short-lived, as four months later he won a 1965 by-election in Altrincham and Sale caused by the elevation to the peerage of Frederick Erroll. In opposition, he led Edward Heath's campaign to become Conservative party leader in 1965, and became party chairman in 1967. The Conservatives won the general election in 1970, and Barber held his seat until the general election of October 1974, when he himself entered the House of Lords.

== Chancellor of the Exchequer ==
After winning the election in 1970, Edward Heath appointed Barber as Chancellor of the Duchy of Lancaster and gave him the responsibility for negotiating the entry of the UK into the European Economic Community. However, following the sudden death of Iain Macleod on 20 July, only four weeks after the election, Barber became the new Chancellor of the Exchequer, although he was initially reluctant to take the job. His appointment prompted Harold Wilson to remark that it was the first time that he had realised that Heath had a sense of humour. In line with the initial liberal instincts of Heath's 1970 government, he oversaw a major liberalisation of the banking system under the title of 'Competition and Credit Control', leading to a high level of lending, much of it to speculative property concerns. In his first Budget, in March 1971, he proposed to replace purchase tax and Selective Employment Tax with Value Added Tax, and also relaxed exchange controls; both were prerequisites to membership of the EEC. VAT came into force in 1973 at a standard rate of 10%. A year later, the rate was cut to 8%.

Barber also reduced direct taxes. High levels of economic growth followed, but the traditional capacity constraints of the British economy - especially currency and balance of trade concerns - quickly choked the economic boom. The banking system fell towards crisis as the bubble burst.

During his term the economy suffered due to stagflation and industrial unrest. In 1972 he delivered a budget which was designed to return the Conservative Party to power in an election expected in 1974 or 1975. This budget led to a period known as "The Barber Boom". The measures in the budget led to high inflation and wage demands from Public Sector workers. He was forced to introduce anti-inflation measures on 6 November 1972, along with a Price Commission and a Pay Board. The inflation of capital asset values was also followed by the 1973 oil crisis which followed the Yom Kippur War, adding to inflationary pressures in the economy and feeding industrial militancy (already at a high as a result of the struggle over the Industrial Relations Act 1971).

In 1972, having said a week earlier in the House of Commons that he had "no reason to believe that the pound was overvalued", he floated it (most of the world currencies were fixed under the Bretton Woods system at that time) "as a temporary measure". The pound immediately plunged on the markets, and it was impossible during his time as Chancellor to impose a new parity.

Following a strike by the miners, and a Three-Day Week, Heath called for a general election on 28 February 1974 with the slogan "Who governs Britain?" The election returned a minority Labour government and Harold Wilson as Prime Minister.

== Later years ==
Barber did not seek re-election at the general election of October 1974, and left front-line politics. He was made a life peer on 6 January 1975 as Baron Barber of Wentbridge in West Yorkshire, and served as Chairman of Standard Chartered Bank from 1974 to 1987, where future Prime Minister John Major was his personal assistant. In 1987, he was appointed to be a Deputy Lieutenant of the County of West Yorkshire. Barber was also a director of BP from 1979 to 1988. He visited Nelson Mandela in prison, and was a member of the Franks Committee that investigated the Falklands War. In 1991, he became chair of the RAF Benevolent Association's appeal for the 50th anniversary of the Battle of Britain, which raised £26 million.

== Personal life and death ==
In 1950, Barber married Jean Asquith, who was also a Conservative parliamentary candidate in that year's election. They had two daughters and were married until her death in 1983. In 1989, he married Rosemary Youens.

Barber suffered from Parkinson's disease in later years, and died from bronchopneumonia at Ipswich Hospital on 16 December 2005.

Parliament of the United Kingdom
Preceded by Ray Gunter	Member of Parliament for Doncaster; 1951–1964	Succeeded by Harold Walker
Preceded by Frederick Erroll	Member of Parliament for Altrincham and Sale; 1965–1974	Succeeded by Fergus Montgomery
Political offices
Preceded by Frederick Erroll	Economic Secretary to the Treasury; 1959–1962	Succeeded by Edward du Cann
Preceded by Edward Boyle	Financial Secretary to the Treasury; 1962–1963	Succeeded by Alan Green
Preceded by Enoch Powell	Minister of Health; 1963–1964	Succeeded by Kenneth Robinson
Preceded by Edward du Cann	Chairman of the Conservative Party; 1967–1970	Succeeded by Peter Thomas
Preceded by George Thomson	Chancellor of the Duchy of Lancaster; 1970	Succeeded by Geoffrey Rippon
Preceded by Iain Macleod	Chancellor of the Exchequer; 1970–1974	Succeeded by Denis Healey
