= Frederick Erroll, 1st Baron Erroll of Hale =

British Conservative politician (1914–2000)

Colonel The Right Honourable The Lord Erroll of Hale TD PC
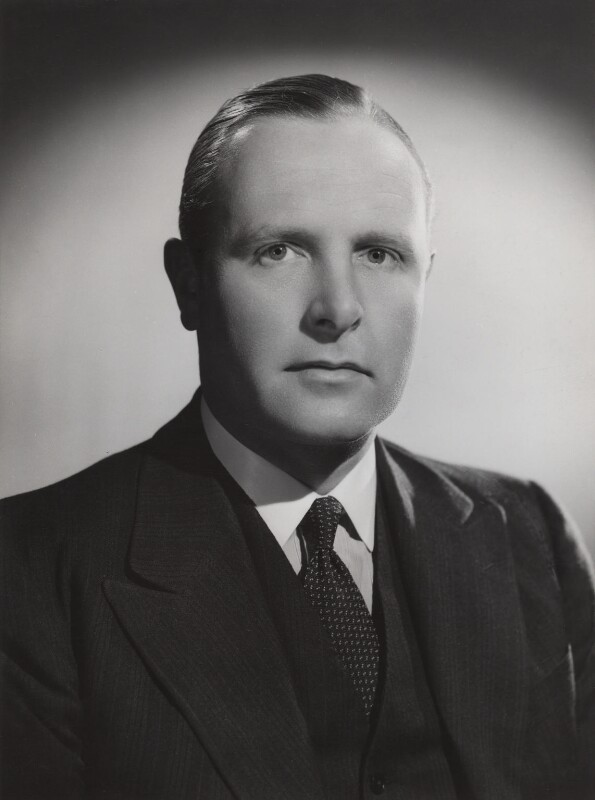
- Frederick Erroll, 1945

Member of the House of Lords
- Lord Temporal
- Hereditary peerage 19 December 1964 – 11 November 1999
- Preceded by: Peerage created
- Succeeded by: Seat abolished
- Life peerage 16 November 1999 – 14 September 2000

President of the Board of Trade
- In office 9 October 1961 – 20 October 1963
- Prime Minister: Harold Macmillan
- Preceded by: Reginald Maudling
- Succeeded by: Edward Heath

Member of Parliament for Altrincham and Sale
- In office 5 July 1945 – 19 December 1964
- Preceded by: New Constituency
- Succeeded by: Anthony Barber

Personal details
- Born: 27 May 1914 London, England
- Died: 14 September 2000 (aged 86)
- Spouse: Elizabeth Barrow (m. 1950)

Frederick James Erroll, 1st Baron Erroll of Hale, Baron Erroll of Kilmun, TD, PC (27 May 1914 – 14 September 2000) was a British Conservative politician.

== Background and education ==
Erroll was the son of George Murison Bergmans, an engineer, and Kathleen, daughter of George Brodrick Edington, a Glasgow ironmaster. The family changed their German surname to Erroll during the First World War. He was educated at Oundle School and at Trinity College, Cambridge, graduating with a bachelor's degree in mechanical sciences.

== Early life and Second World War ==
Erroll was an engineer at Metropolitan-Vickers Electrical Co. Ltd, Manchester, 1936–38. He was commissioned into 4th County of London Yeomanry (Sharpshooters), Territorial Army in 1939, and held technical appointments in connection with tank construction and testing (advising SEAC, 1940–43) and served in India and Burma, 1944–45. He left the forces in 1945 with the rank of colonel.

== Political career ==
Erroll was elected as Member of Parliament for Altrincham and Sale in 1945, holding the seat until 1964. He was Parliamentary Secretary to the Ministry of Supply, 1955–56; Parliamentary Secretary to the Board of Trade, 1956–58; Economic Secretary to the Treasury, 1958–59; Minister of State for Trade, 1959–61; President of the Board of Trade, 1961–63; and Minister of Power, 1963–64. In 1964 he was raised to the peerage as Baron Erroll of Hale, of Kilmun in the County of Argyll. In 1972 he was President of the Electric Vehicle Association of Great Britain. In 1999, aged 85, he was awarded a life peerage as Baron Erroll of Kilmun, of Kilmun in Argyll and Bute, to allow him to sit in the House of Lords following the passing of the House of Lords Act 1999, which excluded hereditary peers.

He was a Member of the House of Lords Select committee on Science and Technology, 1985–91. He held a large number of business appointments.

== Personal life ==
He married Elizabeth Barrow in 1950. Lord Erroll of Hale died in Kensington and Chelsea aged 86. As they had no children, the hereditary barony became extinct on his death.

Coat of arms of Frederick Erroll, 1st Baron Erroll of Hale
Crest A chevronel round embattled Sable. Escutcheon Per bend Azure and Gules on a bend embellished of six electric flashes Or a fleur-de-lys and two lozenges Sable. Supporters Dexter an elephant guardant Sable, sinister a bear reguardant Argent muzzled Azure and from the muzzle a cord Sable ringed or and reflexed over the back. Motto It Will Come Out All Right

Parliament of the United Kingdom
New constituency	Member of Parliament for Altrincham and Sale; 1945–1964	Succeeded by Anthony Barber
Political offices
Preceded by Sir Edward Boyle	Parliamentary Secretary to the Ministry of Supply; 1955–1956	Succeeded by Ian Harvey
Preceded by Derek Walker-Smith	Parliamentary Secretary to the Board of Trade; 1956–1958	Succeeded by John Rodgers
Vacant	Economic Secretary to the Treasury; 1958–1959	Succeeded by Anthony Barber
Preceded by John Vaughan-Morgan	Minister of State for Trade; 1959–1961	Succeeded by Sir Keith Joseph
Preceded by Reginald Maudling	President of the Board of Trade; 1961–1963	Succeeded by Edward Heath
Preceded by Richard Wood	Minister of Power; 1963–1964	Succeeded by Frederick Lee
Peerage of the United Kingdom
New creation	Baron Erroll of Hale; 1964–2000	Extinct
