= Roy Roebuck =

British politician (1929–2023)

Member of Parliament for Harrow East
- In office 1966-1970

Personal details
- Born: 25 September 1929 Manchester, England
- Died: 17 December 2023 (aged 94)
- Party: Labour
- Spouse: Mary Ogilvy Adams
- Children: 1
- Education: Inns of Court School of Law; University of Leicester
- Military career
- Branch: Air Force
- Service years: 1948-1950
- Unit: Far East Air Force

Roy Delville Roebuck (25 September 1929 – 17 December 2023) was a British Labour Party politician and journalist. He was the Member of Parliament for Harrow East from 1966 to 1970.

== Early life ==
Roebuck was born in Manchester on 25 September 1929. He served in the Royal Air Force for his National Service from 1948 to 1950, working as a wireless operator in the Far East Air Force. From 1950 to 1966, he was a journalist, working for the Stockport Advertiser, Northern Daily Telegraph, Yorkshire Evening News, Manchester Evening Chronicle, News Chronicle, Daily Express, Daily Mirror and Daily Herald. Roebuck was also assistant editor of Forward, a socialist newspaper. He became a freelance journalist in 1966, and was a columnist for the London Evening News from 1968 to 1970.

== Political career ==
Roebuck unsuccessfully fought Altrincham and Sale for Labour in 1964 and at a 1965 by-election. He was elected as the Member of Parliament for Harrow East in 1966, an election which his party won, in which he gained the marginal seat from the incumbent Conservative Anthony Courtney. In Parliament, Roebuck was a member of the Select Committees on Estimates (1968–70) and the Parliamentary Commissioner (1968–70).

From 1966 to 1967, Roebuck was an aide to George Wigg, the Paymaster-General. Roebuck was a founder member of the Labour Common Market Safeguards Committee in 1967. At the 1970 general election, when he lost the seat to the Conservative candidate Hugh Dykes. Roebuck unsuccessfully stood in Leek, another marginal seat, at the February 1974 general election.

== Outside Parliament ==
Roebuck trained at the Inns of Court School of Law, and was called to the Bar at Gray's Inn in 1974. From 1975 to 1983, he worked for his former parliamentary boss, who had become Lord Wigg, and was President of the Betting Office Licensees Association.

Roebuck sat on the Board of Governors at Moorfields Eye Hospital from 1984 to 1988. Robeuck was a governor at Thornhill School in Islington from 1986 to 1988. He was also a member of the Islington Community Health Council from 1988 to 1992, and became a Fellow of the Atlantic Council in 1993.

In 1997, whilst in his late 60s, he gained a law degree (LLM) from the University of Leicester, and received an MA in 2000.

== Personal life and death ==
Roebuck married virologist Dr Mary Ogilvy Adams, they had a son, Gavin (www.gavinroebuck.com) Roebuck's wife died in 1995. He listed his recreations in Who's Who as "tennis, ski-ing, music, reading Hansard and the public prints".

Roebuck lived in Islington, north London. He died on 17 December 2023, at the age of 94.

Parliament of the United Kingdom
Preceded by Anthony Courtney	Member of Parliament for Harrow East; 1966–1970	Succeeded by Hugh Dykes
