= Altrincham and Sale =

Parliamentary constituency in the United Kingdom, 1945–1997

- Former county constituency for the House of Commons
- Altrincham and Sale in Greater Manchester, showing boundaries used from 1983–1997
- County: 1945–1974: Cheshire; 1974–1997: Greater Manchester
- Major settlements: Altrincham and Sale

1945–1997
- Seats: One
- Created from: Altrincham
- Replaced by: Altrincham and Sale West and Wythenshawe and Sale East

Altrincham and Sale was a parliamentary constituency in Greater Manchester, represented in the House of Commons of the Parliament of the United Kingdom. It elected one Member of Parliament (MP) by the first past the post system of election, and existed between 1945 and 1997.

== History and boundaries ==
The House of Commons (Redistribution of Seats) Act 1944 set up Boundary Commissions to carry out periodic reviews of the distribution of parliamentary constituencies. It also authorised an initial review to subdivide abnormally large constituencies (those exceeding an electorate of 100,000) in time for the 1945 election. This was implemented by the Redistribution of Seats Order 1945 under which Cheshire was allocated one additional seat, by splitting the constituency of Altrincham into two seats:

- Altrincham and Sale, comprising the two respective municipal boroughs; and
- Bucklow, comprising the bulk of the remainder of the constituency

The constituency remained unchanged until 1 April 1974 when, under the terms of the Local Government Act 1972, the boroughs of Altrincham and Sale were absorbed into the new metropolitan borough of Trafford within the county of Greater Manchester. However, the boundaries were not revised until the Third Periodic Review of Westminster constituencies came into effect for the 1983 general election. The revised constituency consisted of the south-eastern area of Trafford, with the main town being Altrincham, and comprised:

The Metropolitan Borough of Trafford wards of Altrincham, Bowdon, Broadheath, Brooklands, Hale, Sale Moor, Timperley, and Village.

Hale and Bowdon were transferred from the abolished Cheshire constituency of Knutsford, while parts of the former municipal borough of Sale, including Ashton upon Mersey, were included in the new constituency of Davyhulme.

The constituency was abolished for the 1997 general election, when it was split in a roughly three to one ratio between the new constituencies of Altrincham and Sale West and Wythenshawe and Sale East.

== Political history ==
The constituency always elected a Conservative member with a comfortable majority and only had three MPs during its 52 years in existence. From 1945, it was represented by Frederick Erroll, a cabinet minister in Harold Macmillan's government, who was raised to the peerage in 1964. The ensuing by-election (held in 1965) was won by Anthony Barber, who served as Edward Heath's Chancellor of the Exchequer. Barber also entered the House of Lords, and at the October 1974 general election was succeeded by Fergus Montgomery, later Sir Fergus Montgomery, who served as parliamentary private secretary to Margaret Thatcher, during her tenure as Secretary of State for Education, and then as Leader of the Opposition. Montgomery held the seat until he retired in 1997.

== Members of Parliament ==
Election	Member	Party	Notes
1945	Fred Erroll	Conservative	Disqualified December 1964 on being raised to the peerage
1965 by-election	Anthony Barber	Conservative	Previously MP for Doncaster 1951–64; Chancellor of the Exchequer 1970-74
Oct 1974	Sir Fergus Montgomery	Conservative	
1997	Constituency abolished: see Altrincham and Sale West & Wythenshawe and Sale East		

== Elections ==
=== Election in the 1940s ===
1945 general election: Altrincham and Sale
Party	Candidate	Votes	%	±%
Conservative	Frederick Erroll	26,656	55.61	
Labour	M.C. Joseph	21,275	44.39	
Majority		5,381	11.22	
Turnout		47,931	80.3	
Conservative win (new seat)				

=== Elections in the 1950s ===
1950 general election: Altrincham and Sale
Party	Candidate	Votes	%	±%
Conservative	Frederick Erroll	30,843	57.41	+1.8
Labour	Frank Bibby	16,544	30.79	−13.6
Liberal	Lawrence Gordon Bayley	6,340	11.8	New
Majority		14,299	26.6	+15.4
Turnout		53,727	88.4	+8.1
Conservative hold		Swing	+7.7	

1951 general election: Altrincham and Sale
Party	Candidate	Votes	%	±%
Conservative	Frederick Erroll	33,987	66.1	+8.7
Labour	James Brian O'Hara	17,465	33.9	+3.1
Majority		16,522	32.2	+5.6
Turnout		51,452	84.0	−4.4
Conservative hold		Swing	+2.8	

1955 general election: Altrincham and Sale
Party	Candidate	Votes	%	±%
Conservative	Frederick Erroll	30,586	62.2	−3.9
Labour	Trevor Park	12,174	24.8	−9.1
Liberal	Donald Fletcher Burden	6,436	13.1	New
Majority		18,412	37.4	+5.2
Turnout		49,196	80.0	−4.0
Conservative hold		Swing	+2.7	

1959 general election: Altrincham and Sale
Party	Candidate	Votes	%	±%
Conservative	Frederick Erroll	29,992	56.0	−6.2
Labour	Norman Atkinson	14,141	26.4	+1.6
Liberal	Donald Fletcher Burden	9,415	17.6	+4.5
Majority		15,851	29.6	−7.8
Turnout		53,548	82.6	+2.6
Conservative hold		Swing	−3.9	

=== Elections in the 1960s ===
1964 general election: Altrincham and Sale
Party	Candidate	Votes	%	±%
Conservative	Frederick Erroll	24,982	46.8	−9.2
Labour	Roy Roebuck	14,945	28.0	+1.6
Liberal	Donald Fletcher Burden	13,429	25.2	+7.6
Majority		10,037	18.8	−10.8
Turnout		53,356	81.9	−0.7
Conservative hold		Swing	−5.4	

By-election 1965: Altrincham and Sale
Party	Candidate	Votes	%	±%
Conservative	Anthony Barber	20,380	50.0	+3.2
Labour	Roy Roebuck	11,837	29.0	+1.0
Liberal	Donald Fletcher Burden	7,898	19.4	−5.8
Independent	G.O. Symes	634	1.6	New
Majority		8,543	21.0	+2.2
Turnout		40,749		
Conservative hold		Swing	+1.1	

1966 general election: Altrincham and Sale
Party	Candidate	Votes	%	±%
Conservative	Anthony Barber	24,736	48.0	+1.2
Labour	Joyce Cope	17,899	34.7	+6.7
Liberal	Alan Cooper	8,891	17.3	−7.9
Majority		6,837	13.3	−5.5
Turnout		51,526	78.0	−3.9
Conservative hold		Swing	−5.5	

=== Elections in the 1970s ===
1970 general election: Altrincham and Sale
Party	Candidate	Votes	%	±%
Conservative	Anthony Barber	27,904	53.2	+5.2
Labour	Barry E. Jones	16,671	31.8	−2.9
Liberal	Lawrence Gordon Bayley	7,875	15.0	−3.3
Majority		11,233	21.4	+8.1
Turnout		52,450	74.1	−3.9
Conservative hold		Swing	+4.1	

February 1974 general election: Altrincham and Sale
Party	Candidate	Votes	%	±%
Conservative	Anthony Barber	26,434	44.3	−8.9
Liberal	Desmond Blackburn	17,738	29.7	+14.7
Labour	Derek Rutherford	15,550	26.0	−5.8
Majority		8,696	14.6	−6.8
Turnout		59,722	82.2	+8.1
Conservative hold		Swing	−11.82	

October 1974 general election: Altrincham and Sale
Party	Candidate	Votes	%	±%
Conservative	Fergus Montgomery	23,910	42.8	−1.5
Labour	Eric Wood	16,998	30.4	+4.4
Liberal	Desmond Blackburn	14,980	26.8	−2.9
Majority		6,912	12.4	−2.2
Turnout		55,888	76.3	−5.9
Conservative hold		Swing	−2.9	

1979 general election: Altrincham and Sale
Party	Candidate	Votes	%	±%
Conservative	Fergus Montgomery	29,873	51.6	+8.8
Labour Co-op	Garth Pratt	14,643	25.3	−5.1
Liberal	John Campbell	12,603	21.8	−5.0
Ecology	C. Marsh	796	1.4	New
Majority		15,230	26.3	+13.9
Turnout		57,915	77.7	+1.4
Conservative hold		Swing	+4.1	

=== Elections in the 1980s ===
1983 general election: Altrincham and Sale
Party	Candidate	Votes	%	±%
Conservative	Fergus Montgomery	25,321	52.5	+0.9
Liberal	Brian Clancy	14,410	29.9	+8.1
Labour	Alexander Erwin	7,684	15.9	−9.4
Ecology	C. Marsh	629	1.3	−0.1
Independent	Lee J. Wolstenholme	152	0.3	New
Majority		10,911	22.6	
Turnout		48,196	73.0	−4.7
Conservative hold		Swing		

1987 general election: Altrincham and Sale
Party	Candidate	Votes	%	±%
Conservative	Fergus Montgomery	27,746	53.5	+1.0
Liberal	John Mulholland	13,518	26.1	−3.8
Labour	David Hinder	10,617	20.5	+4.6
Majority		14,228	27.4	+4.8
Turnout		51,881	76.7	+3.7
Conservative hold		Swing	+2.4	

=== Elections in the 1990s ===
1992 general election: Altrincham and Sale
Party	Candidate	Votes	%	±%
Conservative	Fergus Montgomery	29,066	54.7	+1.2
Labour	Mary E. Atherton	12,275	23.1	+2.6
Liberal Democrats	John Mulholland	11,601	21.8	−4.3
Natural Law	John C. Renwick	212	0.4	New
Majority		16,791	31.6	+4.2
Turnout		53,154	80.2	+3.5
Conservative hold		Swing		

== See also ==
- Parliamentary constituencies in Greater Manchester
- History of parliamentary constituencies and boundaries in Cheshire

== Notes and references ==
Parliament of the United Kingdom
Preceded by Enfield West	Constituency represented by the chancellor of the Exchequer; 1970–1974	Succeeded by Leeds East
