= Tony McNulty =

British Labour politician (born 1958)

The Right Honourable Tony McNulty
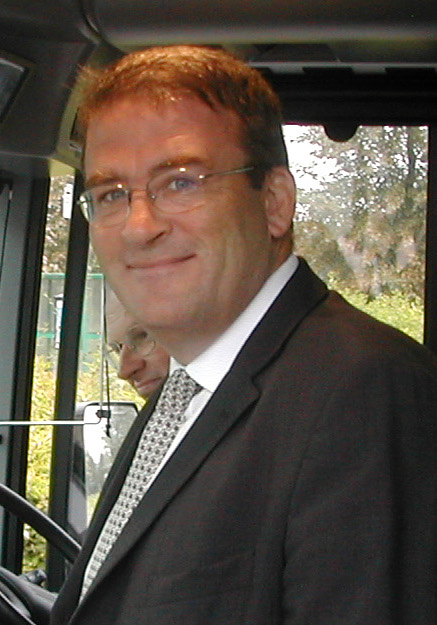
- McNulty in 2004

Minister of State for Employment and Welfare Reform
- In office 3 October 2008 – 5 June 2009
- Prime Minister: Gordon Brown
- Preceded by: Stephen Timms
- Succeeded by: Jim Knight

Minister for London
- In office 3 October 2008 – 5 June 2009
- Prime Minister: Gordon Brown
- Preceded by: Tessa Jowell
- Succeeded by: Tessa Jowell
- In office 12 March 2003 – 13 June 2003
- Prime Minister: Tony Blair
- Preceded by: Nick Raynsford
- Succeeded by: Keith Hill

Minister of State for Security, Counter-Terrorism, Crime and Policing
- In office 5 May 2006 – 3 October 2008
- Prime Minister: Tony Blair; Gordon Brown
- Preceded by: Hazel Blears
- Succeeded by: Vernon Coaker

Minister of State for Immigration, Citizenship and Nationality
- In office 6 May 2005 – 5 May 2006
- Prime Minister: Tony Blair
- Preceded by: Des Browne
- Succeeded by: Liam Byrne

Parliamentary Under-Secretary of State for Transport
- In office 29 May 2002 – 10 September 2004
- Prime Minister: Tony Blair
- Preceded by: Sally Keeble
- Succeeded by: Charlotte Atkins

Lord Commissioner of the Treasury
- In office 12 June 2001 – 29 May 2002
- Prime Minister: Tony Blair
- Preceded by: Jane Kennedy (1999)
- Succeeded by: Phil Woolas

Member of Parliament for Harrow East
- In office 1 May 1997 – 12 April 2010
- Preceded by: Hugh Dykes
- Succeeded by: Bob Blackman

Personal details
- Born: 3 November 1958 (age 67) Kensington, London, England
- Party: Labour
- Spouse(s): Gillian Travers (m. 1994) (divorced) Dame Christine Gilbert (m. 2002)
- Education: University of Liverpool; Virginia Polytechnic Institute and State University

Anthony James McNulty (born 3 November 1958) is a retired British politician who was the Labour Member of Parliament (MP) for Harrow East from 1997 to 2010. During his ministerial career, which began in 2003, he was Minister for London and later Minister of State for Employment and Welfare Reform at the Department for Work and Pensions. He resigned his position on 5 June 2009 after allegations in the press regarding his expenses.

== Background, education and early political career ==
His father migrated to England from County Donegal, Ireland.

McNulty was educated at the Salvatorian College, Wealdstone and at Stanmore Sixth Form College. He graduated from the University of Liverpool with a BA in Political Theory and Institutions and an MA in Political Science from Virginia Tech in the United States. Before becoming an MP, he was leader of the Labour group on Harrow council and a senior lecturer in Organisational Behaviour, at the University of North London from 1983–97. In 1986, he was elected to Harrow Council for Stanmore South ward.

== Parliamentary career ==
McNulty was an unsuccessful Labour candidate for Harrow East in the 1992 general election, but was elected as the constituency's MP in the May 1997 general election. He served as a Whip from 1999 to 2002, following a period as Parliamentary Private Secretary to David Blunkett. McNulty was then appointed Parliamentary Under Secretary to the Office of the Deputy Prime Minister with responsibility for neighbourhood renewal, housing and planning. He was moved to the Department for Transport in June 2003 as Parliamentary Under Secretary with responsibility for aviation, local transport, and London, and was promoted to Minister of State with responsibility for Rail and London in September 2004.

McNulty moved to the Home Office on 9 May 2005 as Minister of State for Immigration, following the general election reshuffle. In May 2006 his Home Office portfolio changed to responsibility over the policing and crime, security and counter-terrorism. In July 2007, he became a Privy Councillor. In Gordon Brown's reshuffle on 3 October 2008, McNulty moved to become Minister of State for Employment and Welfare Reform at the Department for Work and Pensions and Minister for London, and was permitted to attend cabinet meetings until his resignation on 5 June 2009. During his period as Minister, McNulty was concerned with benefit fraud suggesting that "we are absolutely determined to stop benefit thieves stealing from the British taxpayer. Our commitment extends beyond the borders of the UK. Even in sunny Spain, we're closing in on benefit fraud".

=== MPs' expenses controversy ===
In 2009, McNulty was one of many MPs who were involved in a political scandal following the disclosure of expenses of Members of the United Kingdom Parliament. In March 2009, he admitted claiming expenses on a second home, occupied by his parents, which was 8 miles away from his primary residence, after details appeared in The Mail on Sunday. McNulty said that the claim was appropriate, but he ceased claiming the allowances. He was asked to apologise to the House of Commons and repay £13,837, which he did.

In an article headlined "Tony McNulty, Benefit Cheat", Alex Massie in a blog for The Spectator contrasted the statements made by McNulty regarding benefit cheats with his own claims for expenses. On 18 May 2007, McNulty was one of the 98 MPs who voted in favour of exempting parliamentarians from the application of the Freedom of Information Act 2000.

On 5 June 2009, after the revelations in the expenses scandal, McNulty resigned from the government. At the 2010 general election, McNulty lost to Bob Blackman of the Conservative Party.

== Personal life ==
In September 2002, McNulty married Christine Gilbert, Her Majesty's Chief Inspector of Schools for Ofsted, in Hammersmith and Fulham. Gilbert was headmistress of Whitmore High School for eight years, starting when she was 32. It was the second marriage for both. McNulty had first married in 1994 to Gillian Travers, who later stood as a Labour candidate for Ruislip-Northwood in 2001.

Parliament of the United Kingdom
Preceded by Hugh Dykes	Member of Parliament for Harrow East; 1997–2010	Succeeded by Bob Blackman
Political offices
Preceded by Des Browne as Minister of State for Immigrstion, Citizenship and Counterterrorism	Minister of State for Immigration, Citizenship and Nationality	Succeeded by Liam Byrne as Minister of State for Borders and Immigration
New creation	Minister of State for Security, Counterterrorism, Crime and Policing; 2006–2008	Succeeded by Vernon Coaker
Preceded by Stephen Timms	Minister of State for Employment and Welfare Reform; 2008–2009	Succeeded by Jim Knight
Preceded by Tessa Jowell	Minister for London; 2008–2009	Succeeded by Tessa Jowell
