= Hugh Dykes =

British politician (born 1939)

The Right Honourable The Lord Dykes
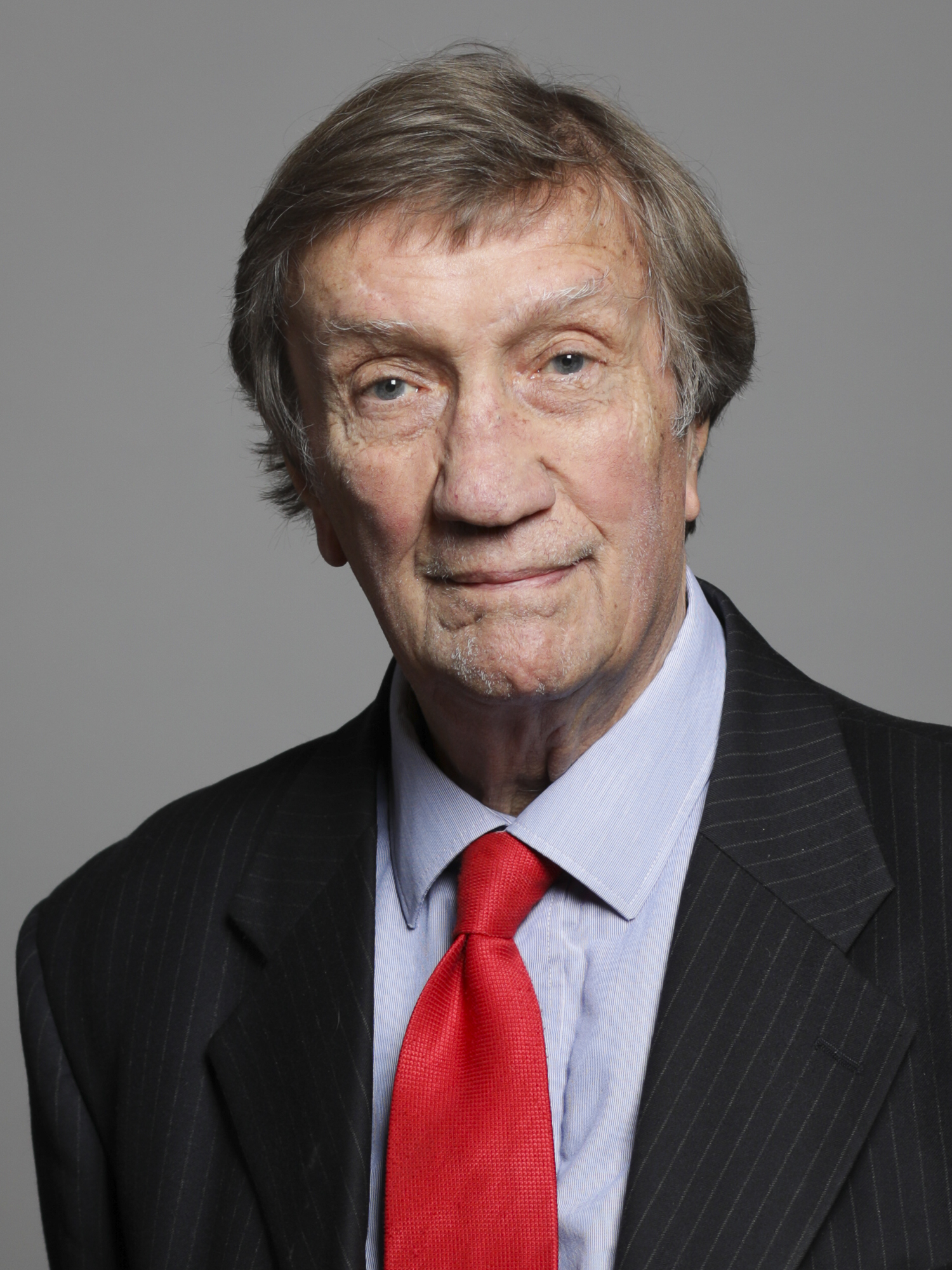
- Official portrait, 2020

Member of the House of Lords
- Lord Temporal
- Life peerage 21 June 2004 – 2 March 2026

Member of Parliament for Harrow East
- In office 18 June 1970 – 8 April 1997
- Preceded by: Roy Roebuck
- Succeeded by: Tony McNulty

Personal details
- Born: 17 May 1939 (age 86)
- Party: Liberal Democrats; Conservative (until 1997)
- Spouse: Susan Margaret Smith (dissolved)
- Awards: Legion of Honour – (2004)

Hugh John Maxwell Dykes, Baron Dykes, (born 17 May 1939) is a British politician and member of the House of Lords. He served as a Conservative Member of Parliament (MP) from 1970 to 1997, and later defected to the Liberal Democrats.

== Family and education ==
Dykes was educated at Weston-super-Mare Grammar School, Somerset, followed by Pembroke College, Cambridge. He married Susan Margaret Smith in 1966 and they had three sons; Oliver, Jonathan and Jethro. The couple divorced in 2000. Dykes has been in a relationship with Sarah Allder since 2003.

== Life and career ==
After unsuccessfully contesting the safe Labour seat of Tottenham in 1966, Dykes served as a Conservative Member of Parliament for Harrow East from 1970 until he lost his seat at the 1997 general election. Having served as an MP for 27 years, he was one of the most senior casualties of the election. He also served as a Member of the European Parliament between 1974 and 1977. While an MP, Dykes served in the Ministry of Defence and the Cabinet Office in Edward Heath's government.

Following the defeat of Kenneth Clarke in the Conservative leadership contest following the 1997 general election, Dykes joined the Liberal Democrats. Within a year of joining the party, he came to serve as an adviser to Paddy Ashdown on European Union affairs.

He has served as chairman of the European Movement-UK and as vice president of the British-German Association. In 1991 he was awarded the German Order of Merit, followed by the Luxembourg Médaille pour l'Europe in 1993.

In 2004, Dykes was raised to the peerage as Baron Dykes, of Harrow Weald in the London Borough of Harrow. The same year he received the French Légion d'Honneur.

Parliament of the United Kingdom
| Preceded by Roy Roebuck | Member of Parliament for Harrow East; 1970 – 1997 | Succeeded by Tony McNulty |
Orders of precedence in the United Kingdom
| Preceded by The Lord Rana | Gentlemen; Baron Dykes | Followed by The Lord Broers |
