= The War of the Running Dogs =

1971 book by Noel Barber

The War of the Running Dogs: How Malaya Defeated the Communist Guerrillas, 1948-60
- Author: Noel Barber
- Language: English
- Subject: Malayan Emergency
- Genre: Non-fiction
- Publisher: Collins
- Publication date: 1971
- ISBN: 978-0-00-211932-0

The War of the Running Dogs: How Malaya Defeated the Communist Guerrillas, 1948-60 is a 1971 non-fiction history book by British writer Noel Barber about the Malayan Emergency.

== Content ==
The text is broken up into three parts, coinciding with the author's division of the Malayan Emergency into three phases: "Phase One: The Communist Offensive, 1948-51," "Phase Two: Counter-Attack, 1952-4," and "Phase Three: The Road To Victory, 1954-60."

== Publication history ==
Noel Barber, the author, was a foreign correspondent working for London's Daily Mail who had travelled with the Dayak headhunters in Malaya during the Malayan Emergency.

The War of the Running Dogs was first published by Wm. Collins in 1971, and was issued in Fontana Books shortly after in 1972. The book has had several reprint editions, including an illustrated reprint edition in 2004.

== Reception ==
The book was reviewed in International Affairs by Malcolm Caldwell, who wrote that the book was an interesting journalistic account of the Malayan Emergency, but was weakened by Barber's "total partisanship and failure to understand the social and economic roots of the Malayan revolution."

A 1972 review in The Military Engineer described it as "well-researched" and "well worth reading." A 1973 review by Gordon P. Means in Pacific Affairs wrote that the book was a "vivid account of Malaya's twelve year war against the Communist guerrillas" but noted that attention to the roles of indigenous leadership in Malaya, as well as Communist strategies and policies during the conflict, were noticeably absent from the text.

== External link ==
- Full text of The War of the Running Dogs at the Internet Archive
