= Noel Barber =

British novelist and journalist (1909–1988)

- Born: 9 September 1909
- Died: 10 July 1988 (aged 78)

Noel Barber (9 September 1909 – 10 July 1988) was a British novelist and journalist. Many of his novels, set in exotic countries, are about his experiences as leading foreign correspondent for the Daily Mail. He was the son of John Barber and his Danish wife, Musse, and had two brothers: Kenneth, a banker, and Anthony Barber, Baron Barber.

Most notably he reported from Morocco, where he was stabbed five times. In October 1956, Barber survived a gunshot wound to the head by a Soviet sentry in Hungary during the Hungarian revolution. A car crash ended his career as journalist. He then began writing novels: he became a best-selling novelist in his seventies with his first novel, Tanamera.

== Novels ==
- Tanamera: A Novel of Singapore (1981)
- A Farewell to France (1983)
- A Woman of Cairo (1984) Published in the United States as Sakkara (1985)
- The Other Side of Paradise (1986)
- The Weeping and the Laughter (1988)
- The Daughters of the Prince (1990)

== Non-fiction ==
- How Strong is Japan? (1942)
- How Strong is America? (1942)
- Trans-Siberian (1942)
- Prisoner of War (1944)
- Cities (1951) (with Rupert Croft-Cooke)
- Fires of Spring (1952)
- Strangers in the Sun (1955)
- A Handful of Ashes: A Personal Testament of the Battle of Budapest (1957)
- The White Desert (1958)
- Distant Places (1959)
- The Flight of the Dalai Lama (1960)
- Life with Titina (1961)
- Adventures At Both Poles (1963)
- Conversations with Painters (1964)
- The Black Hole of Calcutta (1965)
- Let's Visit the USA (1967)
- Sinister Twilight: The Fall And Rise Again of Singapore (1968)
- From the Land of Lost Content (1969)
- The War of the Running Dogs: How Malaya Defeated the Communist Guerrillas, 1948-60 (1971)
- The Sultans (1973)
- Lords of the Golden Horn: From Suleiman the Magnificent to Kamal Ataturk (1973)
- Seven Days of Freedom: Hungarian Uprising, 1956 (1974)
- The Week France Fell: 10–16 June 1940 (1976)
- The Natives Were Friendly So We Stayed the Night (1977)
- The Singapore Story (1978)
- Fall of Shanghai: Communist Takeover in 1949 (1979)

== Adaptations ==
Tanamera was filmed as a television serial in 1989 as Tanamera – Lion of Singapore, while The Other Side of Paradise was filmed for TV in 1992 as The Other Side of Paradise.
