= Competition and credit control (UK) =

Monetary policy

Competition and credit control (CCC) was a monetary policy operated by the Bank of England from September 1971 until the autumn of 1973. Under this policy the bank sought to control money supply indirectly through open market operations, instead of through the direct lending ceilings imposed on individual banks used formerly. Reserve Asset Ratios were imposed on all financial institutions where formerly cash and liquidity rations had applied to major clearing banks only. In practice, sterling money supply increased rapidly following introduction. At the end of 1973, the Supplementary Special Deposit Scheme re-established direct controls on lending.
