= Frederick Skinnard =

British Labour politician

- Born: 8 March 1902
- Died: 5 August 1984 (aged 82)

Frederick William Skinnard (8 March 1902 – 5 August 1984) was a British Labour politician.

Born in Plymouth, Skinnard was educated at Devonport High School, and then the Borough Road Training College, after which he became a schoolteacher in London. He also joined the Labour Party and the Fabian Society, and served on the central executive committee of the National Society for the Prevention of Cruelty to Children.

Skinnard was elected Member of Parliament for the normally Conservative seat of Harrow East in 1945. He served until 1950 when it reverted to the Conservatives. After his defeat, he became registrar and external director of examinations for the Institute of Optical Science.

Parliament of the United Kingdom
New constituency	Member of Parliament for Harrow East; 1945–1950	Succeeded by Ian Harvey
