= Harrow East =

Parliamentary constituency in the United Kingdom, 1945 onwards

Coordinates: 51.606°N 0.313°W

- Borough constituency for the House of Commons
- Interactive map of boundaries from 2024
- Location within Greater London
- County: Greater London
- Electorate: 76,299 (March 2020)
- Major settlements: Stanmore, Kenton, Queensbury, Belmont, Harrow Weald, Canons Park

Current constituency
- Created: 1945
- Member of Parliament: Bob Blackman (Conservative)
- Seats: One
- Created from: Hendon & Harrow (parts of)

Harrow East is a constituency (Note: A borough constituency (for the purposes of election expenses and type of returning officer)) in Greater London created in 1945 and represented in the House of Commons of the UK Parliament since 2010 by Bob Blackman, a Conservative. (Note: As with all constituencies, Harrow East elects one Member of Parliament (MP) by the first past the post system of election at least every five years.)

== Constituency profile ==
Harrow East is a suburban constituency located on the outskirts of Greater London, around 10 miles (16 km) north-west of the centre of London. It covers the neighbourhoods of Stanmore, Canons Park, Harrow Weald and parts of Kenton. The area became connected to London through suburban development in the early 20th century, and has average levels of wealth and deprivation. House prices in the constituency are below the London average.

The constituency is ethnically diverse. White people made up 37% of the population at the 2021 census, around half of whom were of non-British origin; the area has a large Romanian community. Asians (primarily Indians) were the largest ethnic group, making up 47% of residents. Harrow East has one of the largest Hindu populations of any constituency in the country, at 28%.

In general, residents of Harrow East are likely to be homeowners and have average levels of education. Household income is similar to the London average, and a high proportion of residents work in the health industry. At the local council level, almost all seats in the constituency are represented by Conservatives, with a small number of Labour Party councillors in the east of the constituency. An estimated 51% of voters in Harrow East supported remaining in the European Union in the 2016 referendum, higher than the nationwide figure of 48% but lower than the rest of London.

== History ==
The seat was created in 1945 and has been varied due to two sets of major ward reconfigurations and by other national boundary reforms. The predecessor seats were Hendon and to a much lesser extent Harrow.

From 1945 to 2010, it was a stronger area for the Labour Party than neighbouring Harrow West; nevertheless, the seat had been mostly held by the Conservative Party. Labour did win here in landslide victories in 1945, 1966 and 1997, and after the latter, held on in the two subsequent general elections. Commencing with the 1979 general election, and prior to the 2024 general election, the seat was a bellwether by reflecting the national result. The 2017 result produced the 29th-most marginal majority of the Conservative Party's 317 seats by percentage of majority.

The seat was regained in 2010 by the Conservative Bob Blackman on a high turnout whilst Labour's incumbent managed to hold on to Harrow West, as boundary changes had favoured Labour there. Residents in the borough include fewer people in the category of no qualifications than the national average, in 2011, at 16.8%.

In the 2024 general election, Harrow East had the second-largest percentage majority of any Conservative-held seat in the country, behind only Richmond and Northallerton, the seat of then-Prime Minister Rishi Sunak; it was the only seat in the country where the Conservatives exceeded 50% of the vote.

== Boundaries ==
=== Historic ===
1945–1950: The Urban District of Harrow wards of Kenton, Stanmore North, Stanmore South, Wealdstone North, Wealdstone South, and part of Harrow Weald ward.

1950–1955: As above, but the whole of Harrow Weald, and without Wealdstone North or Wealdstone South.

1955–1974: The Municipal Borough of Harrow wards of Belmont, Harrow Weald, Queensbury, Stanmore North and Stanmore South.

Map of boundaries 2010-2024

1974–1978: The London Borough of Harrow wards of Belmont, Harrow Weald, Queensbury, Stanmore North and Stanmore South.

1978–1983: The London Borough of Harrow wards of Canons, Centenary, Harrow Weald, Kenton East, Stanmore Park, Stanmore South and Wemborough.

1983–2010: The London Borough of Harrow wards of Canons, Centenary, Greenhill, Harrow Weald, Kenton East, Kenton West, Marlborough, Stanmore Park, Stanmore South, Wealdstone and Wemborough.

2010–2024: The London Borough of Harrow wards of Belmont, Canons, Edgware, Harrow Weald, Kenton East, Kenton West, Queensbury, Stanmore Park and Wealdstone.

=== Current ===
Further to the 2023 review of Westminster constituencies, which came into effect for the 2024 general election, the constituency is composed of:

- The London Borough of Brent ward of Queensbury; and
- The London Borough of Harrow wards of Belmont, Canons, Centenary, Edgware, Harrow Weald, Kenton East, Kenton West, and Stanmore.

The new boundaries reflect the local authority boundary reviews which came into effect in May 2022.The Borough of Brent ward of Queensbury was transferred from the abolished constituency of Brent North, thus uniting the parts of the suburb of Queensbury in Brent with those in Harrow. The whole of Wealdstone is now included in Harrow West.

== Members of Parliament ==
Election	Member	Party
1945	Frederick Skinnard	Labour
1950	Ian Harvey	Conservative
1959 by-election	Anthony Courtney	Conservative
1966	Roy Roebuck	Labour
1970	Hugh Dykes	Conservative
1997	Tony McNulty	Labour
2010	Bob Blackman	Conservative

== Election results ==
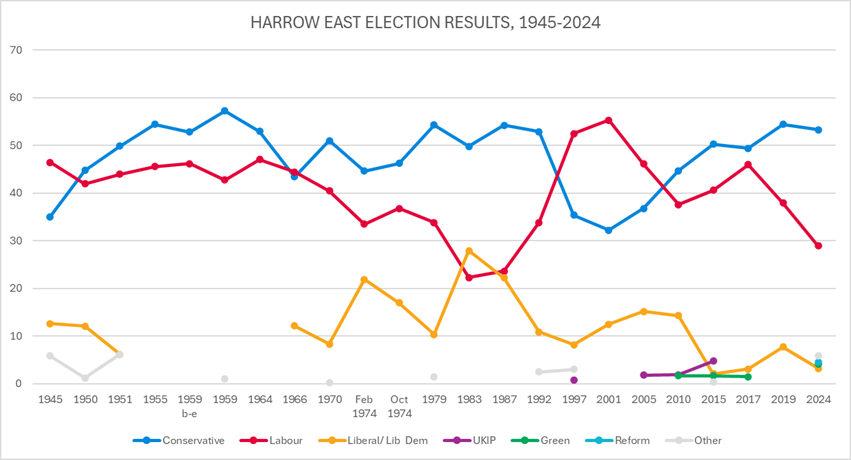
Election results 1945-2024

=== Elections in the 2020s ===
With 53.3% of the vote, Blackman received the highest vote share for any Conservative candidate in the 2024 general election, and was the only Conservative elected with an absolute majority. He was one of three Conservative MPs to be re-elected with increased majorities.

General election 2024: Harrow East
Party	Candidate	Votes	%	±%
Conservative	Bob Blackman	25,466	53.3	–1.3
Labour	Primesh Patel	13,786	28.9	–8.5
Reform	Roger Clark	2,188	4.6	+4.4
Independent	Sabira Lakha	2,097	4.4	N/A
Green	Seb Newsam	2,006	4.2	+3.9
Liberal Democrats	Reetendra Nath Banerji	1,511	3.2	–4.3
Workers Party	Sarajulhaq Parwani	723	1.5	N/A
Majority		11,680	24.4	+7.9
Turnout		47,777	62.5	–6.1
Registered electors		76,386		
Conservative hold		Swing	+3.6	

=== Elections in the 2010s ===
2019 notional result
Party	Vote	%
Conservative	28,555	54.6
Labour	19,568	37.4
Liberal Democrats	3,930	7.5
Green	136	0.3
Brexit Party	98	0.2
Turnout	52,287	68.5
Electorate	76,299	

General election 2019: Harrow East
Party	Candidate	Votes	%	±%
Conservative	Bob Blackman	26,935	54.4	+5.0
Labour	Pamela Fitzpatrick	18,765	37.9	−8.1
Liberal Democrats	Adam Bernard	3,791	7.7	+4.6
Majority		8,170	16.5	+13.1
Turnout		49,491	68.6	−2.3
Registered electors		72,120		
Conservative hold		Swing	+6.5	

General election 2017: Harrow East
Party	Candidate	Votes	%	±%
Conservative	Bob Blackman	25,129	49.4	−0.9
Labour	Navin Shah	23,372	46.0	+5.4
Liberal Democrats	Adam Bernard	1,573	3.1	+1.0
Green	Emma Wallace	771	1.5	−0.2
Majority		1,757	3.4	−6.3
Turnout		50,845	70.9	+1.9
Registered electors		71,755		
Conservative hold		Swing	-3.1	

General election 2015: Harrow East
Party	Candidate	Votes	%	±%
Conservative	Bob Blackman	24,668	50.3	+5.6
Labour	Uma Kumaran	19,911	40.6	+3.0
UKIP	Aidan Powlesland	2,333	4.8	+2.9
Liberal Democrats	Ross Barlow	1,037	2.1	−12.2
Green	Emma Wallace	846	1.7	0.0
TUSC	Nana Asante	205	0.4	New
Majority		4,757	9.7	+2.6
Turnout		49,000	69.0	+1.9
Registered electors		70,981		
Conservative hold		Swing	+1.3	

General election 2010: Harrow East
Party	Candidate	Votes	%	±%
Conservative	Bob Blackman	21,435	44.7	+6.1
Labour	Tony McNulty	18,032	37.6	−7.9
Liberal Democrats	Nahid Boethe	6,850	14.3	+0.1
UKIP	Abhijit Pandya	896	1.9	+0.1
Green	Madeleine Atkins	793	1.7	New
Majority		3,403	7.1	N/A
Turnout		48,006	67.1	+5.8
Registered electors		70,510		
Conservative gain from Labour		Swing	-7.0	

=== Elections in the 2000s ===
General election 2005: Harrow East
Party	Candidate	Votes	%	±%
Labour	Tony McNulty	23,445	46.1	−9.2
Conservative	David Ashton	18,715	36.8	+4.6
Liberal Democrats	Pash Nandhra	7,747	15.2	+2.7
UKIP	Paul Cronin	916	1.8	New
Majority		4,730	9.3	−13.8
Turnout		50,823	60.5	+2.1
Registered electors		83,904		
Labour hold		Swing	−6.9	

General election 2001: Harrow East
Party	Candidate	Votes	%	±%
Labour	Tony McNulty	26,590	55.3	+2.8
Conservative	Peter Wilding	15,466	32.2	−3.2
Liberal Democrats	George Kershaw	6,021	12.5	+4.3
Majority		11,124	23.1	+6.0
Turnout		48,077	58.4	−12.8
Registered electors		82,269		
Labour hold		Swing	+3.0	

=== Elections in the 1990s ===
General election 1997: Harrow East
Party	Candidate	Votes	%	±%
Labour	Tony McNulty	29,962	52.5	+18.7
Conservative	Hugh Dykes	20,189	35.4	−17.4
Liberal Democrats	Baldev Sharma	4,697	8.2	−2.7
Referendum	Bernard Casey	1,537	2.7	New
UKIP	A.J. Scholefield	464	0.8	New
Natural Law	Andrew Planton	171	0.3	−0.1
Majority		9,737	17.1	N/A
Turnout		57,020	71.3	−6.5
Registered electors		79,981		
Labour gain from Conservative		Swing	-18.1	

General election 1992: Harrow East
Party	Candidate	Votes	%	±%
Conservative	Hugh Dykes	30,752	52.9	−1.3
Labour	Tony McNulty	19,654	33.8	+10.2
Liberal Democrats	V.M. Chamberlain	6,360	10.9	−11.3
Liberal	P. Burrows	1,142	2.0	New
Natural Law	S. Hamza	212	0.4	New
Anti-Federalist League	J. Lester	49	0.1	New
Majority		11,098	19.1	−11.6
Turnout		58,169	77.8	+4.4
Registered electors		74,733		
Conservative hold		Swing	-6.2	

=== Elections in the 1980s ===
General election 1987: Harrow East
Party	Candidate	Votes	%	±%
Conservative	Hugh Dykes	32,302	54.2	+4.4
Labour	David John Brough	14,029	23.6	+1.3
Liberal	Zerbanoo Gifford	13,251	22.2	−5.7
Majority		18,273	30.6	+8.7
Turnout		59,582	73.5	+1.0
Registered electors		81,124		
Conservative hold		Swing		

General election 1983: Harrow East
Party	Candidate	Votes	%	±%
Conservative	Hugh Dykes	28,834	49.8	−4.5
Liberal	Richard Hains	16,166	27.9	+17.5
Labour	David Brough	12,941	22.3	−11.5
Majority		12,668	21.9	+1.4
Turnout		57,941	72.5	−5.4
Registered electors		79,926		
Conservative hold		Swing		

=== Elections in the 1970s ===
General election 1979: Harrow East
Party	Candidate	Votes	%	±%
Conservative	Hugh Dykes	20,871	54.32	+8.10
Labour	David Miles	12,993	33.82	−2.99
Liberal	Martin Savitt	3,984	10.37	−6.60
National Front	Leslie Le Croissette	572	1.49	New
Majority		7,878	20.50	+11.09
Turnout		36,936	77.85	+2.95
Registered electors		49,354		
Conservative hold		Swing		

General election October 1974: Harrow East
Party	Candidate	Votes	%	±%
Conservative	Hugh Dykes	17,073	46.22	+1.57
Labour	R.W. Lewis	13,595	36.81	+3.32
Liberal	J. McDonnell	6,268	16.97	−4.90
Majority		3,478	9.41	−1.75
Turnout		36,936	74.90	−7.48
Registered electors		49,315		
Conservative hold		Swing		

General election February 1974: Harrow East
Party	Candidate	Votes	%	±%
Conservative	Hugh Dykes	17,978	44.65	−6.35
Labour	K.W. Childerhouse	13,485	33.49	−7.00
Liberal	J. McDonnell	8,805	21.87	+13.55
Majority		4,493	11.16	+0.65
Turnout		40,268	82.38	+6.44
Registered electors		48,878		
Conservative hold		Swing		

General election 1970: Harrow East
Party	Candidate	Votes	%	±%
Conservative	Hugh Dykes	19,517	51.00	+7.55
Labour	Roy Roebuck	15,496	40.49	−3.92
Liberal	Michael Colne	3,185	8.32	−3.82
Independent	Geoffrey Cramp	72	0.19	New
Majority		4,021	10.51	N/A
Turnout		38,270	75.94	−6.82
Registered electors		50,395		
Conservative gain from Labour		Swing		

=== Elections in the 1960s ===
General election 1966: Harrow East
Party	Candidate	Votes	%	±%
Labour	Roy Roebuck	17,374	44.41	−2.65
Conservative	Anthony Courtney	16,996	43.45	−9.49
Liberal	Michael Colne	4,749	12.14	New
Majority		378	0.96	N/A
Turnout		39,119	82.76	+2.78
Registered electors		47,267		
Labour gain from Conservative		Swing		

General election 1964: Harrow East
Party	Candidate	Votes	%	±%
Conservative	Anthony Courtney	20,307	52.94	−4.28
Labour	Jo Richardson	18,048	47.06	+4.28
Majority		2,259	5.88	−8.56
Turnout		38,355	79.98	−4.56
Registered electors		47,954		
Conservative hold		Swing		

=== Elections in the 1950s ===
General election 1959: Harrow East
Party	Candidate	Votes	%	±%
Conservative	Anthony Courtney	23,554	57.22	+2.79
Labour	Merlyn Rees	17,607	42.78	−2.79
Majority		5,947	14.44	+5.58
Turnout		41,161	84.54	+1.92
Registered electors		49,273		
Conservative hold		Swing		

1959 Harrow East by-election
Party	Candidate	Votes	%	±%
Conservative	Anthony T. Courtney	17,776	52.8	−1.63
Labour	Merlyn Rees	15,546	46.2	+0.63
National Union of Small Shopkeepers	Thomas Lynch	348	1.0	New
Majority		2,220	6.6	−2.2
Turnout		28,795	68.96	−13.64
Registered electors		48,820		
Conservative hold		Swing	-1.1	

General election 1955: Harrow East
Party	Candidate	Votes	%	±%
Conservative	Ian Harvey	22,243	54.43	+4.58
Labour	Merlyn Rees	18,621	45.57	+1.59
Majority		3,622	8.86	+2.99
Turnout		40,864	82.62	−5.24
Registered electors		49,460		
Conservative hold		Swing		

General election 1951: Harrow East
Party	Candidate	Votes	%	±%
Conservative	Ian Harvey	26,896	49.85	+5.1
Labour	Robert D Rees	23,725	43.98	+2.9
Liberal	Geoffrey JE Rhodes	3,329	6.17	−5.91
Majority		3,171	5.87	+3.10
Turnout		53,950	87.86	+0.63
Registered electors		61,408		
Conservative hold		Swing		

General election 1950: Harrow East
Party	Candidate	Votes	%	±%
Conservative	Ian Harvey	23,680	44.75	+9.70
Labour	Frederick Skinnard	22,216	41.98	−4.46
Liberal	Desmond Banks	6,393	12.08	−0.55
Communist	Bill Seaman	633	1.20	−4.67
Majority		1,464	2.77	N/A
Turnout		52,922	87.23	+9.89
Registered electors		60,668		
Conservative gain from Labour		Swing		

=== Elections in the 1940s ===
General election 1945: Harrow East
Party	Candidate	Votes	%	±%
Labour	Frederick Skinnard	27,613	46.44	
Conservative	Fredman Ashe Lincoln	20,843	35.05	
Liberal	Anthony Gibbs	7,513	12.63	
Communist	G Driver	3,493	5.87	
Majority		6,770	11.39	
Turnout		59,462	77.34	
Registered electors		76,883		
Labour win (new seat)				

== See also ==
- List of parliamentary constituencies in London
