= 1965 Altrincham and Sale by-election =

UK Parliamentary by-election

The 1965 Altrincham and Sale by-election was held on 4 February 1965 when the incumbent Conservative MP, Fred Erroll was raised to a hereditary peerage as Baron Erroll of Hale, of Kilmun in the County of Argyll. It was won by the Conservative candidate Anthony Barber, who returned after losing his Doncaster constituency in the 1964 general election.

By Election 1965: Altrincham and Sale
Party	Candidate	Votes	%	±%
Conservative	Anthony Barber	20,380	50.00	+3.18
Labour	Roy D Roebuck	11,837	29.04	+1.03
Liberal	DF Burden	7,898	19.38	−5.79
Independent	GO Symes	634	1.56	New
Majority		8,543	20.96	+2.15
Turnout		40,749		
Conservative hold		Swing	+1.1	
