= Anthony Courtney =

Commander Anthony Tosswill Courtney, OBE, RN (16 May 1908 – 24 January 1988) was a British Royal Navy officer and politician. While a Member of Parliament, he was a victim of a plot apparently instituted by the KGB to discredit him, which appeared to contribute to the loss of his seat. He was a leading member of the Conservative Monday Club.

== Navy training ==
Courtney studied at the Royal Naval College in Dartmouth and the Royal Naval College, Greenwich. He joined the Navy at the age of 16, and served in it for thirty years. From 1925 he was a midshipman on HMS Renown, serving during the world tour of the Duke and Dutchess of York in 1926 - 27. In 1930 he was a sub lieutenant on HMS Cornwall serving on the China Station; at the end of the year he was promoted to lieutenant, and posted to HMS Malaya in the Home Fleet.

In 1933, Courtney studied Russian in Bessarabia and in 1934 qualified as an interpreter. He then qualified at HM Signal School in Portsmouth in signals and wireless telegraphy. He served briefly on the staff of the Commander-in-Chief of the Fleet in Plymouth, before becoming Flag Lieutenant (later Flag Lieutenant-Commander) to a Flag Officer commanding a squadron of the Mediterranean Fleet. He was acting Squadron Signals and Wireless Telegraphy Officer. During the first two years of the Second World War he was on the staff of the Admiral commanding the 3rd Battle Squadron and the North Atlantic Escort Force, based in Halifax, Canada.

== Intelligence work ==
During 1941 and 1942 he served in Moscow as deputy head of the British Naval Mission, and he was head of the Soviet section of British Naval Intelligence from 1946 to 1948. His service was marked with the award of the Order of the British Empire in 1949. He was then an intelligence officer in Germany from 1951.

== Business and politics ==
After retiring from the Navy in 1953 with the rank of commander, Courtney became an export consultant, setting up the Eastern Trading Group Consultancy Services which specialised in trade with the Soviet bloc. He also made a living writing and lecturing. At the 1955 general election, he fought unsuccessfully as a Conservative in Hayes and Harlington.

== Entry to Parliament ==
He had been reselected to fight the seat, but then Courtney was chosen to follow Ian Harvey as Conservative candidate for Harrow East in early 1959. Harvey had been forced to resign over a homosexual scandal in which he was found in flagrante delicto with a guardsman in St. James's Park. Courtney kept the seat in a by-election.

== Parliamentary career ==
Courtney could be a rebellious MP. He opposed the 1961 Defence White Paper and called for replacement of the Royal Air Force's V-bomber force with a fleet of submarines. He supported corporal punishment. He was a consistent advocate of a strong Navy to counter the Soviet Union. In 1962, while on a business trip to Moscow, he demanded a personal visit to see Nikita Khrushchev over the case of Greville Wynne, a British businessman accused of spying by the Soviets. He often raised the issue of religious freedom in Russia.

== Scandal ==
The 1964 general election cut Courtney's majority in Harrow East. In January and March 1965, anonymous letters including pictures of Courtney with Zina Volkova (a guide with Intourist, the Soviet tourist board) were sent to him and his stepson and Alec Douglas-Home, leader of the Conservative Party. The photographs dated from four years previously: Courtney's first wife, Elizabeth Stokes, had died of a heart attack on 1 March 1961, and he had a brief affair with Volkova during the British Industrial Exhibition in May. The letters with the photographs accused Courtney's wife of being unfaithful and urged him to resign before there was a public scandal.

Courtney did nothing, and in the first week of August 1965, a further set of letters was sent to other MPs, a factory owner in Courtney's constituency, and to the News of the World newspaper (which declined to publish). Courtney had retained contacts with MI5, and went to see Roger Hollis; MI5 experts thought the photographs had been faked (as did Courtney himself), and presumed a KGB attempt to damage Courtney. The satirical magazine Private Eye did run the story (although it knew the KGB was behind it), but it was largely kept quiet; however, rumours did circulate in Harrow. He beat off an attempt to deselect him by 454 to 277, but Courtney lost his seat in the 1966 general election.

== Subsequent career ==
Out of Parliament, Courtney sued a Conservative Party official and businessman, Sir Theodore Constantine, for slander arising out of a dinner party when Constantine had given his own view of the scandal. He won the case and was awarded £200 damages. However his second marriage was dissolved in 1968 and his business failed. He set up again as the Managing Director of the New English Typewriting School Ltd from 1969. In 1970 he interrupted the trial of former Labour MP Will Owen, accused of spying for Czechoslovakia, from the public gallery. Courtney married for a third time in 1971.

Parliament of the United Kingdom
Preceded by Ian Harvey	Member of Parliament for Harrow East; 1959–1966	Succeeded by Roy Roebuck
