= Thomas D. Calnan =

English pilot

Thomas Daniel Calnan
- Born: 16 December 1915
- Died: 13 September 1981 (aged 65); Zinal, Switzerland
- Military career
- Allegiance: United Kingdom
- Branch: Royal Air Force
- Service years: 1936–1959
- Rank: Wing Commander
- Conflicts: World War II

Thomas Daniel Calnan (16 December 1915 – 13 September 1981) was an English pilot and prisoner-of-war of World War II, who wrote a memoir of his time in German captivity entitled Free As A Running Fox.

Calnan was commissioned in the RAF on 19 December 1936.

Calnan was shot down while flying a Spitfire on a photo-reconnaissance mission over France in December 1941. He gives some brief background about himself and his flying career with the RAF's No. 1 Photographic Reconnaissance Unit, but devotes most of the book to his escape attempts while a prisoner of the Germans. He was incarcerated at Stalag Luft III during the period of the "Great Escape."

He was promoted to the rank of Wing Commander on 1 January 1949, and retired on 14 February 1959. Calnan latterly lived in Zinal, Switzerland, where he died in September 1981 at the age of 65.
