= 1959 Harrow East by-election =

UK parliamentary by-election

A by-election for the United Kingdom House of Commons was held in the constituency of Harrow East on 19 March 1959, following the resignation of sitting Conservative Member of Parliament (MP) Ian Harvey.

== Background ==
In November 1958, Harvey and a Guardsman from the Coldstream Guards were found in the bushes in St James's Park and arrested; Harvey tried to escape, and attempted to give a false name on arrest. Both were charged with gross indecency and breach of the park regulations; when tried on 10 December, the indecency charge was dropped and both were fined £5. Harvey subsequently resigned his ministerial post and his seat, forcing the by-election; he paid the guardsman's fine as well as his own.

== Candidates ==
The by-election saw the seat held by the Conservative candidate, Anthony Courtney, with a small swing to Labour, whose candidate, the future Home Secretary Merlyn Rees, had contested the seat in 1955, and would do so again in the General Election later in 1959. A minor candidate also stood, representing the National Union of Small Shopkeepers, but he lost his deposit.

== Result ==
Harrow East by-election, 1959
Party	Candidate	Votes	%	±%
Conservative	Anthony T. Courtney	17,776	52.8	−1.63
Labour	Merlyn Rees	15,546	46.2	+0.63
National Union of Small Shopkeepers	Thomas Lynch	348	1.0	New
Majority		2,220	6.6	−2.2
Turnout		28,795	68.96	−13.64
Registered electors		48,820		
Conservative hold		Swing	-1.1	

== Previous result ==
General election 1955: Harrow East
Party	Candidate	Votes	%	±%
Conservative	Ian Harvey	22,243	54.43	+4.58
Labour	Merlyn Rees	18,621	45.57	+1.59
Majority		3,622	8.86	+2.98
Turnout		40,864	82.62	−5.24
Registered electors		49,460		
Conservative hold		Swing		

== See also ==
- Harrow East constituency
- Lists of United Kingdom by-elections
- List of United Kingdom by-elections (1950–1979)
