= Ian Harvey (politician) =

British businessman and politician

Ian Douglas Harvey

Member of Parliament for Harrow East
- In office 23 February 1950 – 24 November 1958
- Preceded by: Frederick Skinnard
- Succeeded by: Anthony Courtney

Personal details
- Born: 25 January 1914
- Died: 10 January 1987 (aged 72)
- Party: Conservative
- Education: Christ Church, Oxford

Lieutenant Colonel Ian Douglas Harvey RA (25 January 1914 – 10 January 1987) was a British businessman and politician, who served as a Conservative Member of Parliament and junior minister from 1950 until his resignation in 1958.

His promising political career ended in disgrace when he was caught having sex with a guardsman in St James's Park.

== Early life ==
Harvey was born in Surrey on 25 January 1914, the son of the Major Douglas Harvey and Dorothy Cundall, who were married in 1912. Dorothy was a noted badminton player, winning three doubles titles at the All England Open Badminton Championships. She remarried to Bert Bisgood in 1922 following the death of Major Douglas Harvey, who was killed in Mesopotamia in 1917.

== Early career ==
Ian Douglas Harvey was educated at Fettes College and Christ Church, Oxford, where he was President of the Oxford University Conservative Association in 1935, and the Oxford Carlton Club and the Oxford Union Society in 1936. He graduated with a BA in 1937.

During the Second World War he served in the anti-aircraft arm of the Royal Artillery, becoming the Adjutant of 123 Light Antiaircraft Regiment Royal Artillery in 1940 and the Brigade Major of 33 AA Brigade RA in 1943, before serving on the staff of HQ AA Command in 1944. After studying at the Staff College, Camberley, he became brigade major of 100 AA Brigade in North-West Europe in 1945.

After the War he served as lieutenant colonel commanding 566 LAA Regiment RA (City of London Rifles) from 1947 to 1950. He worked in public relations, was a member of the Advertising Association and the Institute of Public Relations, and published Talk of Propaganda (1947) and The Technique of Persuasion (1951). From 1949 to 1956 he was a director of W. S. Crawford, an advertising firm.

In 1949, he married Clare Mayhew, daughter of Sir Basil Edward Mayhew, KBE. The couple went on to have two daughters.

== Political career ==
Harvey first stood as a Conservative Party Parliamentary candidate for the seat of Spelthorne in Middlesex at the 1945 general election, but was defeated. From 1947 to 1952 he held a seat on Kensington Borough Council, and from 1949 to 1952 also represented Kensington South on the London County Council. He was a governor of Birkbeck College.

In the 1950 general election he stood for Harrow East, winning the seat and holding it in the 1951 and 1955 general elections. From 1955 to 1957 he was secretary of the 1922 Committee. He was appointed a Parliamentary Secretary to the Minister of Supply in 1956, becoming a Parliamentary Under-Secretary of State at the Foreign Office in 1958. He was a member of a House Select Committee that recommended "draconian punishments for practising homosexuals in the armed forces".

== Resignation ==
In November 1958, Harvey and a 19-year-old guardsman, Anthony Walter Plant of the Coldstream Guards, were found in the bushes in St James's Park and arrested; Harvey tried to escape, and attempted to give a false name on arrest. Both were charged with gross indecency and breach of the park regulations; when tried on 10 December, the indecency charge was dropped and both were fined £5. Harvey paid Plant's fine as well as his own. Harvey subsequently resigned his ministerial post and his seat, forcing a by-election early in 1959, in which he was succeeded by Conservative Anthony Courtney.

== Later career ==
Harvey returned to his earlier public relations work, acting as a director of Colman, Prentis and Varley from 1962 to 1963, and as Advertising Controller of Yardley of London from 1963 to 1964, when he became that company's Advertising Director, a position he held until 1966. In 1971 he published his memoir To Fall Like Lucifer. From 1972 onwards he was the Vice-President of the Campaign for Homosexual Equality, and from 1980 onwards Chairman of the Conservative Group for Homosexual Equality. He was the Chairman of Paddington Conservative Association from 1980 to 1983, and Westminster North Conservative Association in 1983. He contested the latter seat for the Inner London Education Authority in 1986, and chaired one of the ILEA's boards on tertiary education from 1985 until his death. A friend later recalled his last years: "I remember him, a sad old man living alone and forgotten in a small flat."

== Publications ==
- Harvey, Ian (1971). To Fall Like Lucifer. London: Sidgwick & Jackson. ISBN 0-283-48463-2.

Parliament of the United Kingdom
Preceded by Frederick Skinnard	Member of Parliament for Harrow East; 1950–1958	Succeeded by Anthony Courtney
